= List of subsea tunnels in Norway =

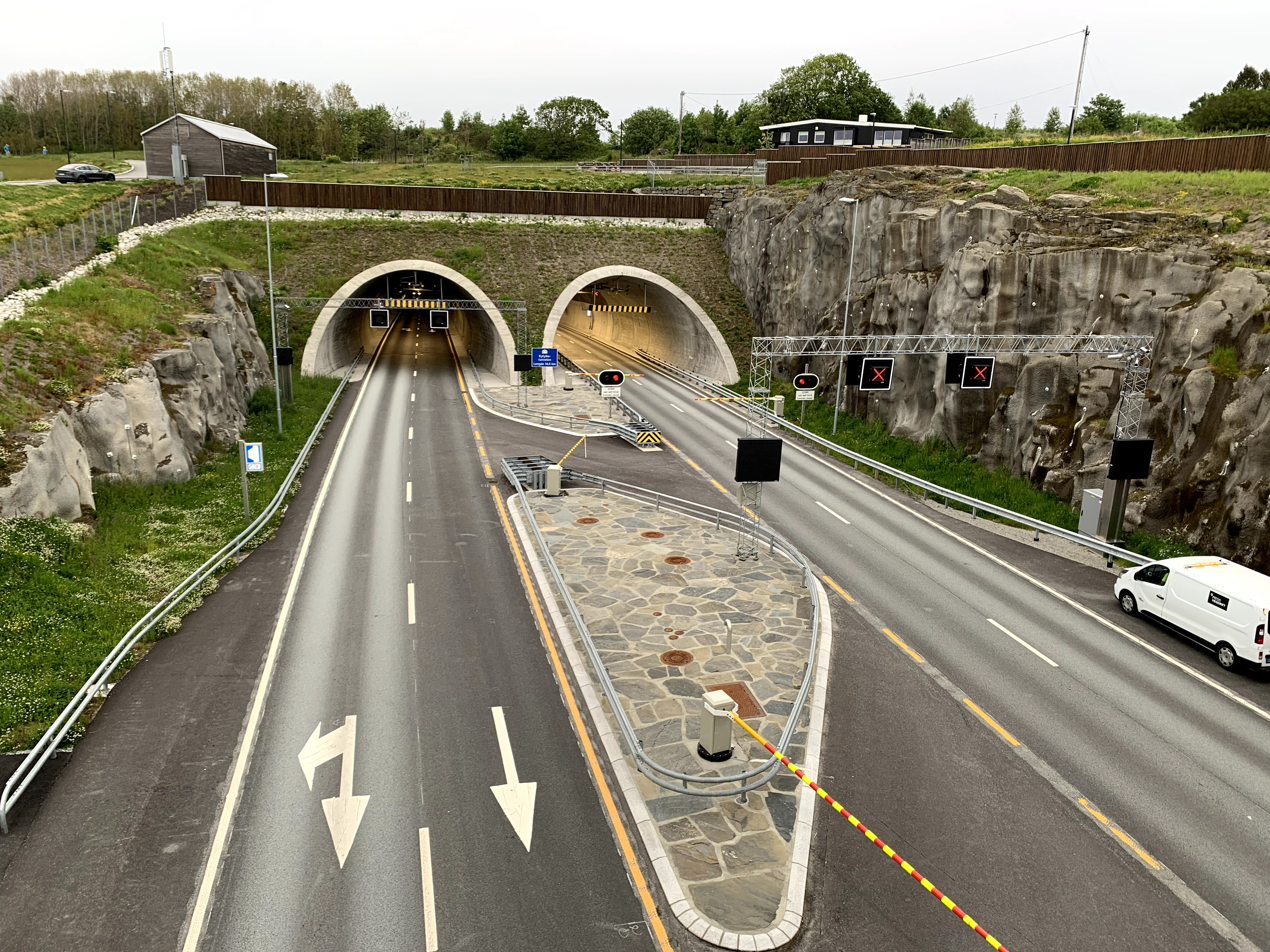
The Ryfylke Tunnel.

Norway's geography is dominated by fjords and islands. As of 2011, the country has thirty-three undersea tunnels, most of which are fixed links. Tunnels are chosen to replace ferries to allow residents of islands and remote peninsulas access to regional centers, where water-crossings are too long for bridges. The Ryfylke Tunnel is the country's longest, at 14,400 meters (47,200 ft).

The Ryfylke Tunnel is the world's deepest, reaching 292 meters (958 ft) below mean sea level. Norway's first subsea tunnel was the Vardø Tunnel, which opened in 1982. Most of the tunnels are built as fixed links, allowing ferry services to be abandoned. In 2010, the first three tunnels in cities, the Bjørvika Tunnel, the Skansen Tunnel and the Knappe Tunnel, were opened, all of which were built as motorways to bypass the city center. Suspended tunnels have been proposed, which could be installed in places too deep for conventional tunnels, such as the Sognefjord.

== Current ==
The following lists all subsea tunnels in use as of 2019. It includes the name, length in meters and feet, depth below mean sea level in meters and feet, the year the tunnel was taken into use with ordinary traffic (which may differ from the year it was officially opened), the road the tunnel carries, the county or counties the tunnel is in, and the municipalities, including any the tunnel passes through. Roads starting with E indicates a European route, while FV indicates a county road without signposted road number; only numbers indicates roadside-numbered county roads which are former national roads.

Name	Length (m)	Length (ft)	Depth (m)	Depth (ft)	Opened	Road	Project	Fixed link for	County(s)	Municipality(s)	Ref(s)
Ryfylke	14,000	46,000	290	950	2019	13	Ryfylke Fixed Link	Ryfylke	Rogaland	Stavanger and Strand	
Karmøy	8,900	29,200	139	456	2013	47	T-Link	—	Rogaland	Karmøy and Tysvær	
Bømlafjord	7,888	25,879	263	863	2000	E39	Triangle Link	Bømlo and Stord	Vestland	Stord and Sveio	
Eiksund	7,765	25,476	287	942	2008	653	Eiksund Fixed Link	Hareidlandet	Møre og Romsdal	Ulstein, Volda, and Ørsta	
Oslofjord	7,280	23,880	134	440	2000	23	—	—	Akershus	Frogn and Asker	
North Cape	6,875	22,556	212	696	1999	E69	—	Magerøya	Finnmark	Nordkapp	
Byfjord	5,875	19,275	223	732	1992	E39	Rennesøy Fixed Link	Mosterøy and Sokn	Rogaland	Randaberg and Stavanger	
Atlantic Ocean	5,779	18,960	250	820	2009	64	—	Kristiansund	Møre og Romsdal	Averøy and Kristiansund	
Finnøy	5,685	18,652	200	660	2009	519	Finnøy Fixed Link	Finnøy and Talgje	Rogaland	Stavanger	
Hitra	5,645	18,520	264	866	1994	714	Hitra–Frøya Fixed Link	Hitra	Trøndelag	Hitra	
Hundvåg*	5,600	18,400			2019	13	Ryfylke Fixed Link	Hundvåg and Ryfylke	Rogaland	Stavanger	
Knappe*	5,400	17,700	29	95	2010	557	Ring Road West	—	Vestland	Bergen	
Frøya	5,305	17,405	164	538	2000	714	Hitra–Frøya Fixed Link	Frøya	Trøndelag	Frøya and Hitra	
Freifjord	5,086	16,686	130	430	1992	70	Kristiansund Fixed Link	Kristiansund	Møre og Romsdal	Gjemnes and Kristiansund	
Mastrafjord	4,424	14,514	133	436	1992	E39	Rennesøy Fixed Link	Rennesøy	Rogaland	Stavanger	
Valderøy	4,222	13,852	133	436	1992	658	Vigra Fixed Link	Valderøya and Vigra	Møre og Romsdal	Giske and Ålesund	
Halsnøy	4,120	13,520	136	446	2008	544	—	Halsnøya	Vestland	Kvinnherad	
Godøy	3,844	12,612	153	502	1989	658	Vigra Fixed Link	Godøy	Møre og Romsdal	Giske	
Hvaler	3,751	12,306	120	390	1989	108	—	Hvaler	Østfold	Hvaler	
Ellingsøy	3,520	11,550	144	472	1987	658	Vigra Fixed Link	Ellingsøy	Møre og Romsdal	Giske	
Tromsøysund*	3,500	11,500	102	335	1994	E8	—	Tromsøya	Troms	Tromsø	
Ibestad	3,396	11,142	112	367	2000	848	—	Rolla	Troms	Ibestad	
Sløverfjord	3,337	10,948	112	367	1997	E10	Lofoten Fixed Link	Lofoten	Nordland	Hadsel	
Bjarkøy	3,250	10,660	129	423	2018	867	Bjarkøy Fixed Link	Bjarkøya	Troms	Harstad	
Vardø	2,892	9,488	88	289	1983	E75	—	Vardøya	Finnmark	Vardø	
Fannefjord	2,743	8,999	101	331	1991	64	Skåla Fixed Link	Skålahalvøya	Møre og Romsdal	Molde	
Rya	2,675	8,776	87	285	2011	858	—	Malangshalvøya	Troms	Tromsø	
Flekkerøy	2,327	7,635	101	331	1989	457	—	Flekkerøy	Agder	Kristiansand	
Melkøysund	2,316	7,598	62	203	2003	Private	—	Melkøya	Finnmark	Hammerfest	
Maursund	2,122	6,962	93	305	1991	866	—	Kågen	Troms	Nordreisa and Skjervøy	
Bjorøy	2,012	6,601	88	289	1996	FV 207	—	Bjorøy	Vestland	Bergen and Øygarden	
Skatestraum	1,902	6,240	91	299	2002	616	Bremanger Fixed Link	Bremangerlandet	Vestland	Bremanger	
Kvalsund	1,650	5,410	56	184	1988	863	—	Rinvassøya	Troms	Tromsø	
Bjørvika*	1,100	3,600	20	66	2010	E18	Oslo Package 1	—	Oslo	Oslo	
Skansen	715	2,346	14	46	2010	706	Nordre avlastningsvei	—	Trøndelag	Trondheim	

== Under construction ==
The following tunnels are under construction, but are not yet completed or taken into use.

Name	Length (m)	Length (ft)	Depth (m)	Depth (ft)	Opening	Road	Project	Fixed link for	County(s)	Municipality(s)	Ref(s)
Rogfast*	25,000	82,000	390	1,280	2033	E39	Rogaland Fixed Link	Kvitsøy and Haugaland	Rogaland	Bokn, Kvitsøy, and Randaberg	

== Proposed ==
The following includes tunnels which have been proposed and which are either being planned by the Norwegian Public Road Administration, or are in the National Transport Plan 2010–2019. Projects which have been abandoned or have not been subject to public investigations are not included. Several of the most trafficked ferry sections are not currently proposed, as the fjords are too deep to have a tunnel with current technology. As of 2011, there are 160 ferry crossings in the country, the majority of which could potentially be replaced by fixed links. For the authorities, the decision to build new tunnels depends on the length, possibility of building a bridge, depth of the sound or fjord and population in the affected areas. While the first tunnels were mostly part of fixed links to connect island and sealocked communities to the mainland, focus has recently shifted more towards replacing ferries on main roads connecting regions, in particular European Route E39, which runs along the west coast.

Name	Length (m)	Length (ft)	Depth (m)	Depth (ft)	Road	Project	Fixed link for	County(s)	Municipality(s)	Ref(s)
Langfjord	10,000	33,000			64	—	Romsdal and Sekken	Møre og Romsdal	Molde and Rauma	
Sotra*	6,000	20,000			555	—	Sotra and Øygarden	Vestland	Bergen and Øygarden	
Tautra*	13,000	43,000			E39	Møre Fixed Link	Otrøya	Møre og Romsdal	Molde and Vestnes	
Storfjord	—	—	—	—	60	—	Sykkylven and Stranda	Møre og Romsdal	Ålesund and Sykkylven	
Trondheimsfjord	15—36 km	—	540	—	715	—	Fosen	Trøndelag	Indre Fosen and Trondheim	
Trondheimsfjord	6—16 km	—	400	—	710/718	Road/Electricity	Fosen	Trøndelag	Orkland and Ørland	
Moss–Horten	17,000	56,000	300	980	82	—	—	Vestfold and Østfold	Horten and Moss	
Langsund	2,900	9,500			863	—	Reinøya	Troms	Karlsøy	

== See also ==
- List of tunnels in Norway
