= Ålesund Airport, Vigra =

Ålesund Airport Ålesund lufthamn

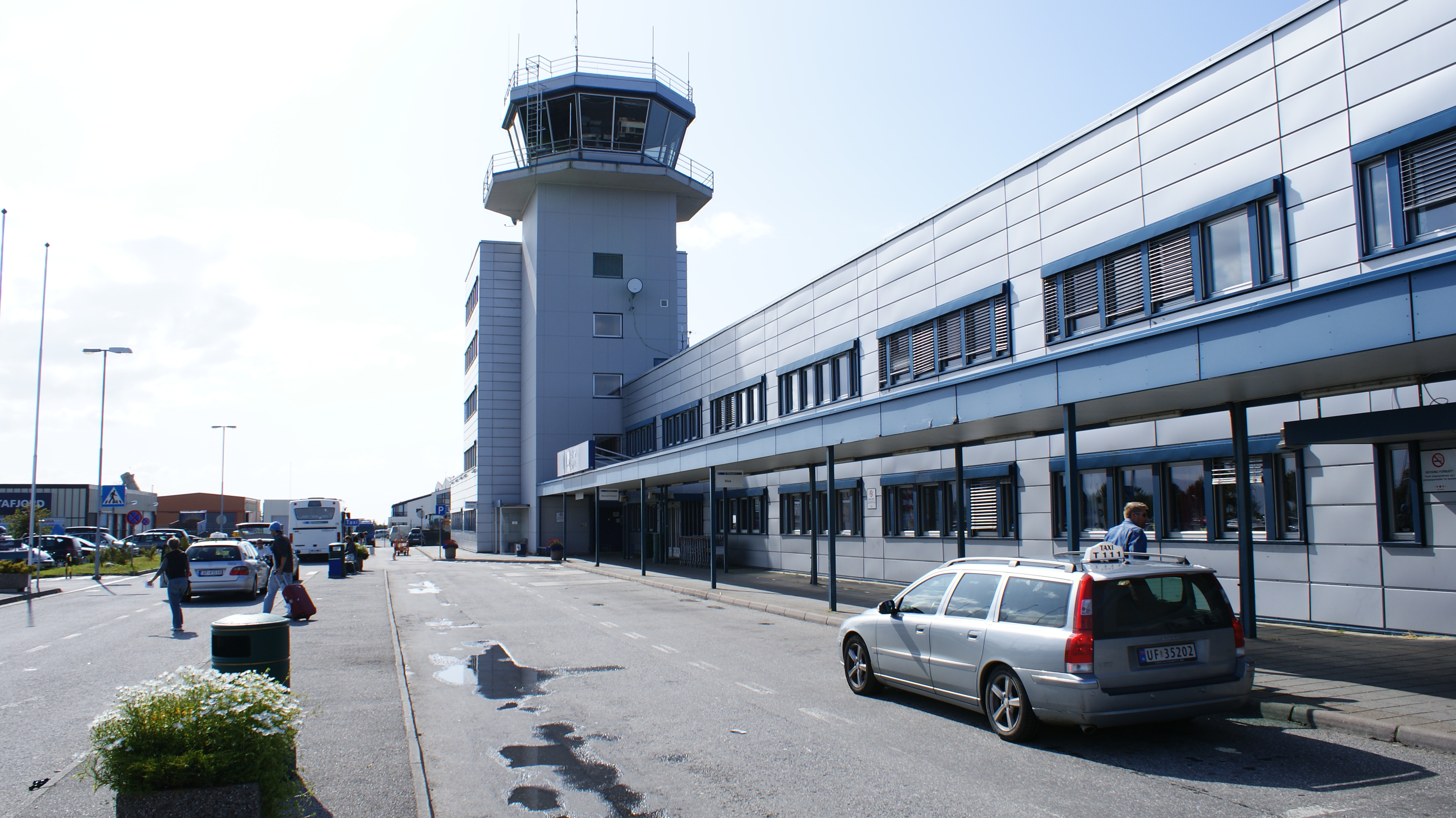
- IATA: AES; ICAO: ENAL

Summary
- Airport type: Public
- Operator: Avinor
- Serves: Ålesund, Norway
- Location: Vigra, Giske Municipality
- Elevation AMSL: 21 m (69 ft)
- Coordinates: 62°33′45″N 006°07′11″E
- Website: Official website

Map
- Location within Norway

Runways
Direction	Length		Surface
Direction	m	ft	Surface
06/24	2,314	7,592	Asphalt

Statistics (2013)
- Passengers: 1,077,209
- Aircraft movements: 16,057
- Cargo (tonnes): 641

Ålesund Airport (Nynorsk: Ålesund lufthamn, IATA: AES, ICAO: ENAL), or alternatively Ålesund Vigra Airport, is an international airport serving the town of Ålesund in Møre og Romsdal county, Norway. It is located on the island of Vigra in Giske Municipality and features a 2,314-meter (7,592 ft) runway aligned 07/25. The airport served 1,077,209 passengers in 2013, making it the tenth-busiest airport in the country. Scheduled services are provided domestically to Oslo, Bergen and Trondheim by Scandinavian Airlines (SAS)¸ Norwegian Air Shuttle and Widerøe. International scheduled services are provided by KLM Cityhopper, Norwegian, SAS and Wizz Air.

The first airport serving Ålesund was Ålesund Airport, Sørneset, a water aerodrome. Vigra, which narrowly beat a proposal for an airport on the island of Gossa as the main airport for Møre og Romsdal, opened on 7 June 1958. It originally featured a 1,600-meter (5,200 ft) runway and all scheduled flights were provided by Braathens SAFE. Except for regional routes operated by Widerøe from 1971 to 1993, Braathens flew all routes out of Vigra until 1998. International flights commenced in 1977 and a new terminal opened in 1986. Norwegian Air Ambulance has operated out of the airport since 1988.

Between 1995 and 1998 the 330 Squadron had a detachment at Vigra for its Westland Sea King for search and rescue. Color Air and SAS started flying to Ålesund in 1998. After suffering heavy losses, SAS bought Braathens and Color Air closed down. Norwegian Air Shuttle thereafter entered, first in 2004 and then in 2008. The terminal was expanded in 2007 and the airport has seen an expansion in international destinations.

== History ==
=== Proposals ===
Plans for scheduled flights to Ålesund were first articulated in 1919 by a government commission as part of a coastal seaplane route from Stavanger to Trondheim. The first landing in Ålesund took place on 27 May 1920. Thereafter flights were sporadic. The Royal Norwegian Navy Air Service set up a base at Skutvika near the town center in November 1929, which they used to search for herring. They moved the base the following year, establishing Ålesund Airport, Sørneset. Later used both for civilian flights, scheduled services and Luftwaffe operations, the Sørneset water aerodrome remained in use until 1979.

Work on a land airport around Ålesund started with a public speech held by Hjalmar Riiser-Larsen in 1933. In further speeches, he proposed Vigra or the Moa area of Spjelkavik as suitable locations. The former was preferred by the government, who included it in its 1935 plan for primary airports. Following the Nazi invasion of Norway during World War II, the Luftwaffe also considered Moa as a suitable location for the region, but instead opted to build an airport on Gossa, which was not completed by the end war.

After the war ended, Møre og Romsdal County Municipality established a commission to look into the location of a central airport for the county of Møre og Romsdal. They concluded that since Gossa was nearly completed and was more centrally located within the county, it would be a preferred location. Community leaders in Ålesund lobbied to have Vigra chosen, and in 1951 two students completed calculations showing that Vigra would be cheaper than Gossa. Despite this, Gossa was selected by Parliament in 1952.

=== Construction ===
The Civil Airport Administration (CAA) issued NOK 3.2 million for the upgrade of Gossa in 1955. However, Vestlandske Luftfartsselskap, which was operating the seaplane route along the coast, launched a plan to operate Scottish Aviation Twin Pioneer aircraft from a 400-meter (1,300 ft) runway at Vigra. The CAA therefore placed Gossa's funding on hold. Ålesund Municipality appointed a commission which demanded that the runway should be 1,000 meters (3,300 ft), allowing for operation of the de Havilland Heron. They negotiated the purchase of the necessary 50 hectares (120 acres) of land at Vigra and started construction on 9 January 1957. At this point Vigra was planned as a regional airport.

Within a short period the CAA determined that the Twin Pioneer would not be approved and that, following Braathens SAFE Flight 253 that Heron's would not be allowed to fly during winter. The municipality therefore applied in February 1957 that Vigra be given status as a primary airport. Parliament approved this and granted funding for air traffic control and operations. Construction involved building a 1,600-by-40-meter (5,250 by 130 ft) runway and 350 meters (1,150 ft) to taxiway. These were built by Veibygg, Fredrikstad Granittkompani and Korsbrekke og Lorck. The terminal was building measured 820 square meters (8,800 sq ft), of which 300 square meters (3,200 sq ft) was a garage, and was built by Bjarne Haugseth. Ålesund Municipality was the owner and developer. Three radio beacons were built.

Ålesund was to be connected both to Oslo Airport, Fornebu, and to a coastal service from Stavanger Airport, Sola via Bergen Airport, Flesland and Ålesund to Trondheim Airport, Værnes. The latter had been operated by Vestlandske Luftfartselskap, but they went bankrupt in 1957. Both Braathens SAFE and SAS applied for the Ålesund concession. Initially the ministry wanted to award the coastal service to Braathens and the Oslo route to SAS. But after negotiations, Braathens SAFE stated they were willing to fly the coastal route without subsidies if they were granted the Oslo-route, allowing them to cross-subsidize the former. This was accepted by the ministry.

=== Early operation ===
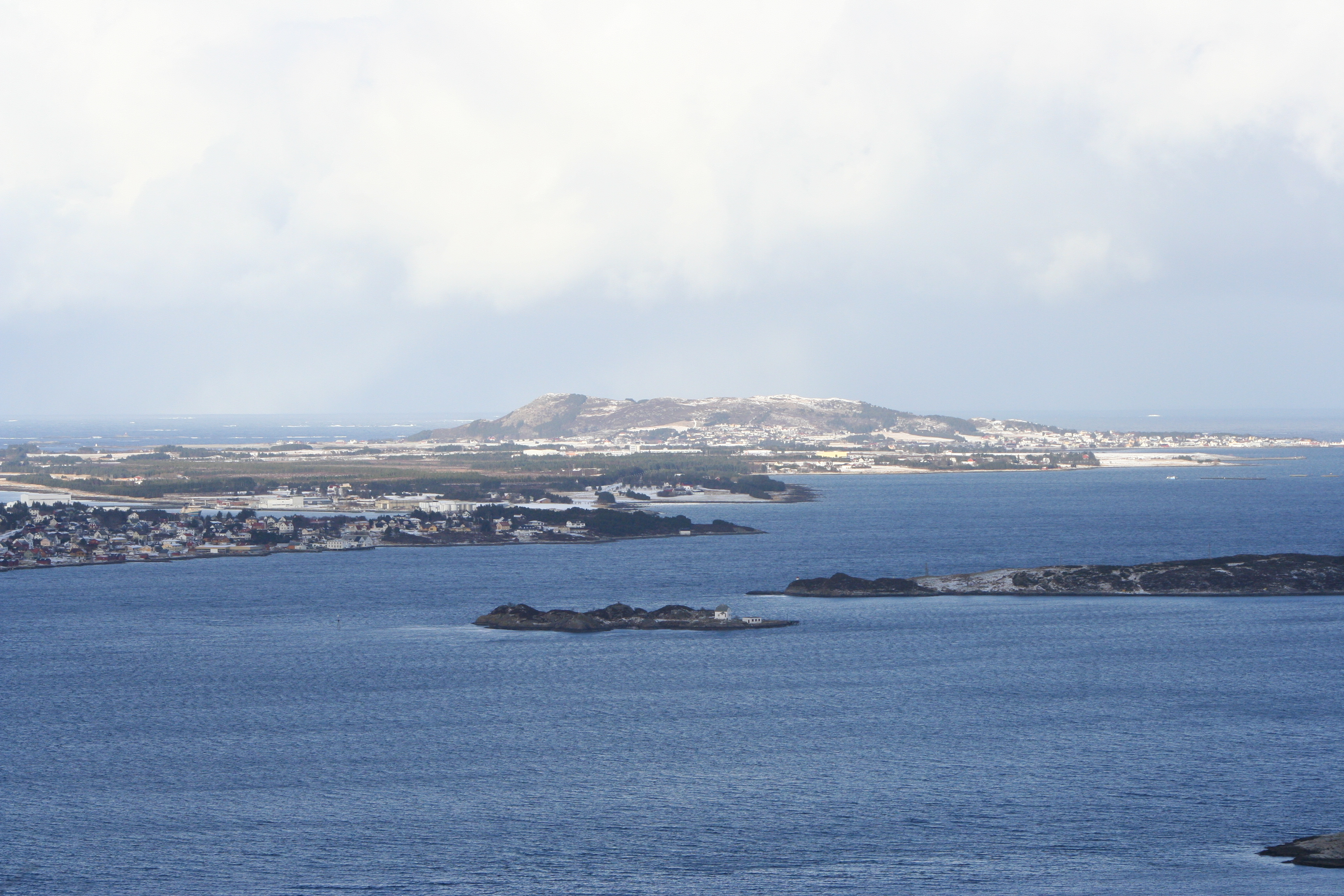
The island of Vigra with the airport

The first aircraft to land was a military de Havilland Canada DHC-3 Otter, on 19 May 1958 with supplies for the navigational aids. Braathens landed a Heron on 2 June. The official opening took place on 7 June with 3,000 spectators. Flights were at first flown using the Douglas DC-4. Initially the coastal service and the Oslo service were flown one time per day.

Vigra did not originally have more to a terminal than a waiting hall. Check-in and baggage pick-up was handled at Braathens SAFE's offices at Skateflua in the city center. They were then transported by bus to the airport by Record og Vigra Rutelag (RVR). They also operated a new car ferry services which was established between Ålesund and Valderøy. Møre og Romsdal Fylkesbåtar (MRF) took over the ferry service from 1965.

Ownership of the airport passed to the CAA and the state from September 1959. This coincided with a new taxiway from the runway and the opening of the instrument landing system (ILS). This could only be used on runway 25. The Vigra Transmitter was situated in the way for the other direction. The ILS was installed without an inner marker. The tarmac was extended in 1960 to make way for a general aviation section near the control tower. Due to sinking of the runway it had to be re-asphalted the following year.

Braathens introduced their new Fokker F27 Friendship from 9 January 1959. From the summer program it flew two daily flights to Oslo and from 1961 twice per day on the coastal route. VHF omnidirectional range and distance measuring equipment navigational system were installed in 1963. Ålesund Airport experienced a massive increase in traffic during the 1960s. A third daily departure to Oslo was introduced in August 1963 and on the coastal route from 2 May 1964. The latter was extended to Bodø Airport and Tromsø Airport from 1 April 1967, and upgraded to a fourth daily service. Some Oslo services were provided using a Douglas DC-6. A year later the coastal route increased to five daily trips, which was matched by the Oslo route in 1969. That year also saws the installation of a visual approach slope indicator and the introduction of the Fokker F28 Fellowship in March.

MRF introduced a hovercraft service from Ørsta via Hareid to Ålesund and Vigra, then onwards to Molde and Åndalsnes. The 18-passenger craft sank only days after the service was inaugurated in April 1965. Two more hovercraft were delivered and served the route. Travel times was 50 minutes to Molde, 80 minutes to Åndalsnes, 25 minutes to Hareid and 50 minutes to Ørsta. However, by the time of the fall storms the authorities withdrew the operating certificate due to safety concerns.

In the course of two years the number of airports in Møre og Romsdal increased from one to four, having a dramatical effect on patronage at Vigra. Kristiansund Airport, Kvernberget opened on 30 June 1970 after which two of the four daily Oslo services were moved there. Ørsta–Volda Airport, Hovden opened on 1 July 1971, along with three airports in Sogn og Fjordane—Florø, Førde and Sogndal. These were connected to Vigra with Widerøe's de Havilland Canada DHC-6 Twin Otter services. Molde Airport, Årø opened on 5 April 1972. Braathens introduced its Boeing 737-200 on one of the Oslo services that year.

A new 728-square-meter (7,840 sq ft) works building opened in 1972, including a new fire station, command center and workshop. The Friendship was pulled out of Vigra from 1976, by which time Braathens was back up to fifteen daily services. The Fellowships had five departures in each direction on the coastal service and the 737s had taken over all the Oslo services. To handle the increased traffic the terminal was slightly expanded with a temporary structure, allowing the airport to handle two simultaneous aircraft.

=== New terminal and longer runway ===
The first inclusive tour charter at Vigra was carried out by Stjernereiser in June 1977, contracting a Sud Aviation Caravelle from Transeuropa to Palma de Mallorca. The short runway meant that the aircraft could not take a full tank of fuel and therefore stopped in Stavanger to refuel. Vigra saw a limited amount of charter, largely since all flight had to have an intermediate landing.

Mørefly, an Ålesund-based air ambulance and helicopter operator, relocated its base from Sørneset to Vigra in 1979. This followed their building of a 750-square-meter (8,100 sq ft) hangar and office building at the airport. Braathens extended its city offices in 1979 and the following year a new wing was added to the terminal for international arrivals. Baggage could from then be picked up either at the airport or in the city center.

Meanwhile, the traffic increased made it necessary for the airport to receive a new major upgrade. The works building was expanded in 1982, including more garages and office space. A new 953-square-meter (10,260 sq ft) control tower was taken into use in November 1984. A new 4,816-square-meter (51,840 sq ft) terminal was also built for NOK 53 million. It included an upper story with a restaurant.

MRF operated a fast ferry service from Hareid to Vigra from 12 September 1983. The parking was expanded from 60 to 254 places, and from 1986 parking became paid. A private competitor, Vigra Parkering, offered parking from 1985 to 1991, after which the CAA bought the lot. The new terminal also featured car rental from four companies. Although the old terminal was proposed used as an offshore helicopter terminal, it caught fire in 1986 and was demolished the following year. Mørefly introduced the first international scheduled service, to Aberdeen Airport in the United Kingdom, from 14 April 1986. In conjunction with this the airport introduced airport security for select passengers. The Aberdeen route was terminated on 28 March 1987.

Norwegian Air Ambulance was established on 1 January 1988. Vigra was selected as the base both for a Beechcraft Super King Air fixed-wing air ambulance and an Aérospatiale SA365N Dauphin 2 rotorcraft. From 1 November 1988 to 31 January 1989 Mørefly operated an Aérospatiale SA332 Super Puma search and rescue helicopter from Vigra, before this was relocated. The Dauphin was relocated to Ålesund Heliport, Hospital when it opened in 1993. Mørefly merged with Lufttransport in 1995.

The Vigra Fixed Link opened between 1987 and 1989. It consists of the 3,520-meter (11,550 ft) long Ellingsøy Tunnel between Ålesund and Ellingsøya, the 4,222-meter (13,852 ft) long Valderøy Tunnel connecting the islands of Ellingsøya and Valderøya, and others. This allowed travelers from Ålesund to reach the airport without a ferry. They remained a toll road until 25 October 2009. RVR and the airport coach service was taken over by Ålesund Bilruter from 1 January 1988.

A precision approach path indicator system was completed in 1991. Three years later an automatic terminal information service was taken into use. The airport had for years been limited by its short runway. The construction of the tunnels spurred a surplus of earthwork, which could be used to reclaim land east of the tunnel and extend the runway along it. However, the extension of the runway proper did not take place until 1994, costing NOK 60 million. The new 2,300-meter (7,500 ft) runway was taken into use on 20 October 1995. The most important part of this extension was that inclusive tour charters resumed from the airport, after several years without such services due to the need for a refueling stop. The airport therefore opened a duty-free store in 1996.

Braathens introduced its Boeing 737-500 at Ålesund in 1990, replacing its older -200s by 1995. Widerøe withdrew from Ålesund in 1993, when the Twin Otters were retired. The same year Braathens subcontracted some Ålesund routes to their regional affiliate, Norwegian Air Shuttle, who operated the Fokker 50.

The Super Puma search and rescue service spurred public demands for a rescue helicopter to be based at Vigra. From 11 September 1995 the 330 Squadron of the Royal Norwegian Air Force stated a Westland Sea King helicopter at Vigra for such a service. However, the proximity to Ørland Main Air Station proved that the area was well covered from there. The service was therefore closed from 1 January 1999 and relocated to Rygge Air Station.

=== Deregulation ===
The Norwegian airline market was deregulated from 1 April 1994. This initially had little effect on Vigra, as there were insufficient slots at Fornebu for new entrants to start flying to Ålesund. Quite the contrary, the deregulation initially led Braathens to terminate the coastal services to Northern Norway, although it maintained flights to Bergen and Trondheim. From 19 April 1998 Braathens also served Ålesund with its Boeing 737-700. A radar was installed at the airport in 1998. The same year all the electronics in the control tower were replaced.

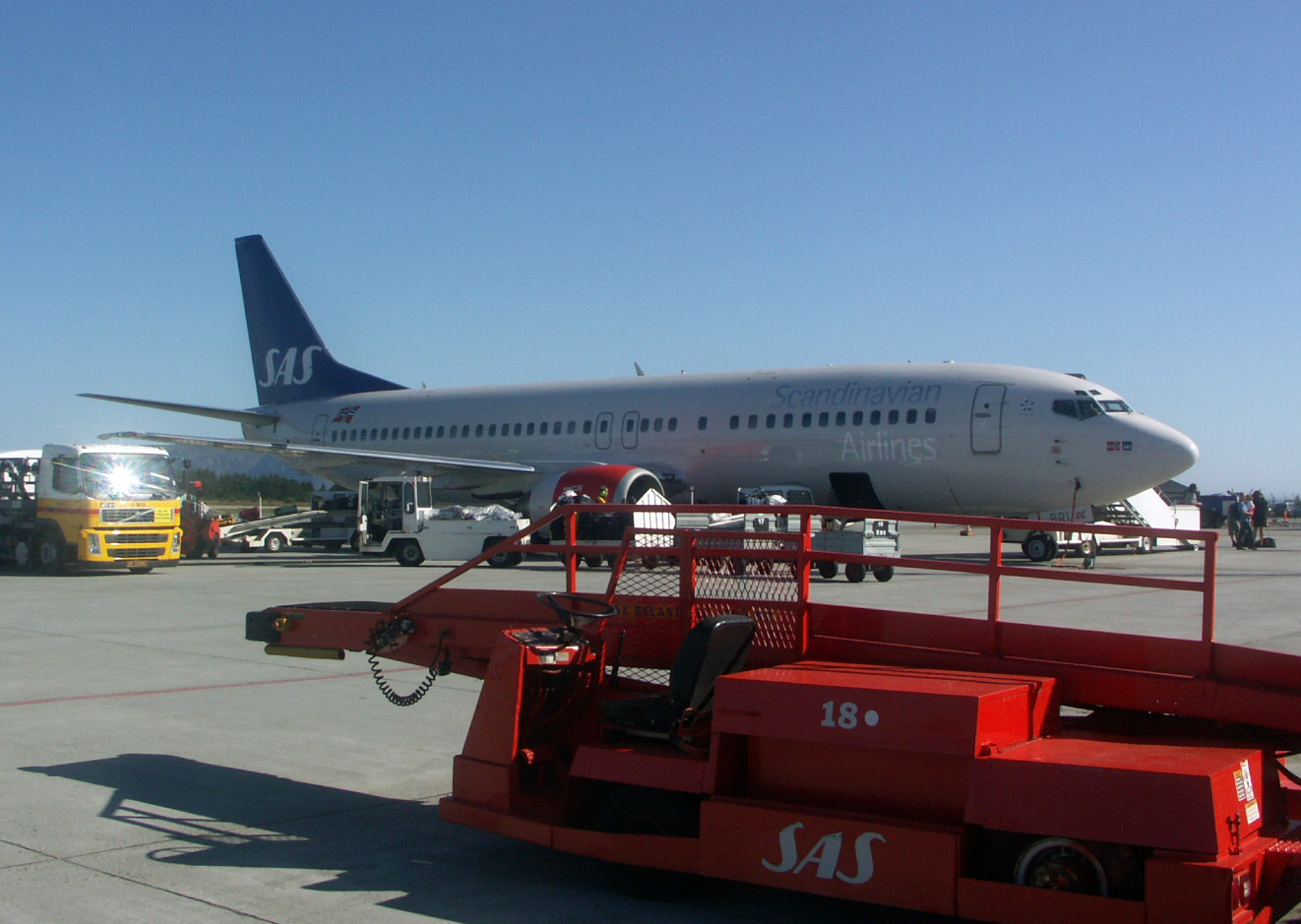
Boeing 737-400 of Scandinavian Airlines

Fornebu was replaced by Oslo Airport, Gardermoen on 8 October 1998, which had ample room for new routes. Ålesund-based businessman Olav Nils Sunde saw the opportunity to establish a low-cost carrier, Color Air. It started twice-daily services from Ålesund to Gardermoen on 6 August, using a Boeing 737-300. SAS introduced flights from Oslo to Ålesund on 7 December. They initially used Douglas DC-9 and McDonnell Douglas MD-80, later switching to Boeing 737-600. The number of Oslo-bound flights thus increased from seven to seventeen. The three operators started an intense price war which within a year had cost them NOK 3 billion. Color Air ceased operations on 27 September 1999. SAS also opened a route to Copenhagen Airport in Denmark via Bergen, which was soon terminated.

SAS bought Braathens in May 2001, from 2002 the two SAS Group airlines coordinated their flights to Ålesund. Their ground services were taken over by SAS Ground Handling. Norwegian Air Shuttle shifted its operations in 2002 from a regional carrier to a low-cost airline. It took up competition with the SAS Group and launched an Oslo route on 23 August 2003 using the Boeing 737-300, using Røros Flyservice as their ground handler. These were most ex-Braathens employees. Norwegian initially remained at Ålesund only until 10 October 2004. Braathens and SAS merged in 2004 to create SAS Braathens, which served Ålesund until 1 June 2007, when it again became part of Scandinavian Airlines.

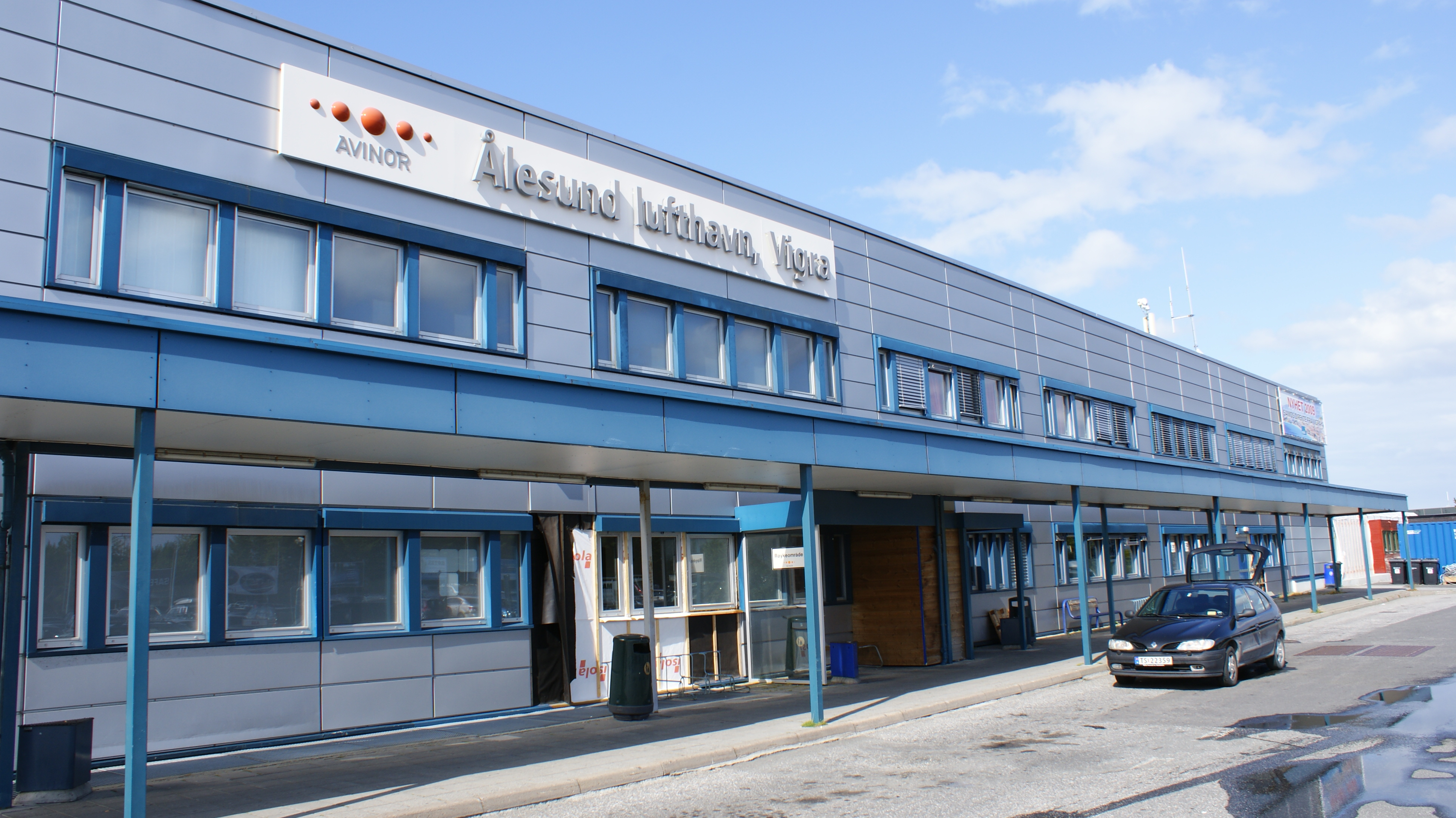
Terminal exterior

Full security check of all passengers took effect on 1 January 2004. An automated weather observing system was installed in 2006. The same year Ålesund Bilruter and the airport coach was taken over by Nettbuss. More tarmac for the general aviation section opened in 2006. In April the following year the main terminal was extended with 620 square meters (6,700 sq ft). This included an arrival section for international passengers, with its own baggage carousel and a larger duty-free store. This allowed for simultaneous arrival of domestic and international passengers.

SAS Braathens commenced a bi-weekly service to London Gatwick Airport on 1 June 2007. It was terminated in 2008. Air Baltic introduced its Riga Airport service on 20 March 2008. SAS commenced a daily service to its hub at Copenhagen Airport from 31 March 2008. From 25 October 2009 this route was flown for SAS by Cimber Sterling using a Bombardier CRJ200 with two daily services. There was insufficient patronage for such a route and SAS resumed a daily service the following year.

Norwegian returned to Vigra on 10 September 2008, when it reintroduced its Oslo service. They introduced bi-weekly services to Gatwick from 16 April 2011, as well as flights to Ålesund to Trondheim and Bergen from the winter program of 2011. They also established weekly services to Alicante Airport and Gran Canaria Airport in Spain in 2012. The Trondheim route had insufficient patronage and were terminated from 1 February 2013. As a response, Krohn Air introduced a twice-daily service to Trondheim on 3 March 2013. It was terminated on 13 September.

Wizz Air introduced thrice-weekly services to Gdańsk Lech Wałęsa Airport in Poland from March 2013. KLM Cityhopper commenced services to Amsterdam Schiphol Airport twice daily from 4 April, using the Fokker 70. It was followed up on 5 June with twice-weekly services by Wizz Air to Vilnius Airport in Lithuania. Norwegian terminated its Bergen route in January 2014. Widerøe responded by starting services to Bergen from the summer program of 2014. SAS responded by introducing more departures to Bergen and Trondheim and replacing some of them with smaller ATR 72 operated by Jet Time.

== Facilities ==
The airport is situated on the island of Vigra on Giske, Norway. The main terminal has 6,400 square meters (69,000 sq ft), including the control tower. Vigra is an international airport with separate departure and arrival section for domestic and international services. The international section has a duty-free store measuring 160 square meters (1,700 sq ft) for both arriving and departing passengers. The upper story features a restaurant while there is a café and kiosk in the lower section. Vigra has a category 7 fire and rescue service. Ground handling is provided by SAS Ground Handling and Aviator.

The asphalt runway measures 2,314 by 45 meters (7,592 by 148 ft) and is aligned 06/24 (roughly northeast to southwest). Runway 06 has a declared take-off run available (TORA) of 2,164 meters (7,100 ft) and a landing distance available (LDA) of 2,014 meters (6,608 ft). The TORA and LDA of runway 24 are 2,314 and 2,083 meters (7,592 and 6,834 ft), respectively. Vigra lacks a parallel taxiway. The airport has a reference altitude of 21 meters (69 ft) above mean sea level. Vigra features a category I instrument landing system. The aerodrome also features doppler VHF omnidirectional range and distance measuring equipment, and a tactical air navigation system.

== Airlines and destinations ==
The following airlines operate regular scheduled and charter flights at Ålesund Airport:

Airlines	Destinations
KLM	Amsterdam
Norwegian Air Shuttle	Alicante, Oslo; Seasonal: London–Gatwick
Scandinavian Airlines	Oslo, Copenhagen; Seasonal charter: Palma de Mallorca
Widerøe	Bergen, Trondheim
Wizz Air	Gdańsk

Norwegian Air Ambulance has a fixed-winged air ambulance stationed at Vigra. The Beechcraft King Air 200 is operated by Lufttransport, with medical personnel from Møre og Romsdal Hospital Trust. The aircraft flew 1,632 missions lasting 1,264 hours in 2013.

== Statistics ==
Ålesund Airport, Vigra served 1,055,098 passengers in 2013, of which 256,512 were international passengers. The airport saw 16,057 aircraft movements and handled 641 tonnes of cargo. Ålesund is the tenth-busiest airport in Norway, measured in passenger numbers.

Annual passenger traffic
Year	Passengers	% Change
2025	1,013,280	▲0.1%
2024	1,012,134	▼ -3.7%
2023	1,050,771	▲13.8%
2022	923,734	▲84.9%
2021	499,478	▲10.4%
2020	452,242	▼ -60.6%
2019	1,147,666	▲1.5%
2018	1,130,868	▲5.0%
2017	1,077,009	▲1.6%
2016	1,060,561	▼ -1.8%
2015	1,080,045	

== Ground transport ==
Nettbuss operates a fleet of eight airport coaches. These run to downtown Ålesund and Moa in correspondence with all arrivals and departures. The airport has parking for 1,050 cars, divided into four categories: short-term, business plus, business and economy.

== Climate ==
Climate data for Ålesund Airport Vigra 1991-2020 (22 m)
Month	Jan	Feb	Mar	Apr	May	Jun	Jul	Aug	Sep	Oct	Nov	Dec	Year
Mean daily maximum °C (°F)	5.2 (41.4)	4.8 (40.6)	5.9 (42.6)	8.8 (47.8)	11.7 (53.1)	14.2 (57.6)	16.5 (61.7)	16.9 (62.4)	14.7 (58.5)	10.9 (51.6)	7.8 (46.0)	5.8 (42.4)	10.3 (50.5)
Daily mean °C (°F)	3.4 (38.1)	2.8 (37.0)	3.6 (38.5)	5.9 (42.6)	8.7 (47.7)	11.4 (52.5)	13.7 (56.7)	14.3 (57.7)	12.2 (54.0)	8.6 (47.5)	5.9 (42.6)	4 (39)	7.9 (46.2)
Mean daily minimum °C (°F)	1.3 (34.3)	0.7 (33.3)	1.3 (34.3)	3.3 (37.9)	6.1 (43.0)	9.1 (48.4)	11.5 (52.7)	12.1 (53.8)	9.8 (49.6)	6.3 (43.3)	3.8 (38.8)	1.8 (35.2)	5.6 (42.1)
Average precipitation mm (inches)	145.8 (5.74)	125.2 (4.93)	121.5 (4.78)	76.1 (3.00)	71.6 (2.82)	80.1 (3.15)	81.1 (3.19)	125.3 (4.93)	142.9 (5.63)	161.7 (6.37)	146.6 (5.77)	165.5 (6.52)	1,443.4 (56.83)
Average precipitation days (≥ 1.0 mm)	18	17	16	13	12	13	12	16	17	19	17	20	190
Source 1: yr.no
Source 2: NOAA - WMO averages 91-2020 Norway

== Bibliography ==
- Flatmark, Jan Olav (1988). Ålesund i hverdag og krig (in Norwegian). Ålesund: Nordvest Forlag. ISBN 82-90330-44-8.
- Hafstad, Bjørn; Arheim, Tom (2003). Marinens flygevåpen 1912–1944 (in Norwegian). TankeStreken. ISBN 82-993535-1-3.
- Hjelle, Bjørn Owe (2007). Ålesund lufthavn Vigra (in Norwegian). Valderøya: Bjørn Owe Hjelle. ISBN 978-82-92055-28-1.
- Tjomsland, Audun; Wilsberg, Kjell (1995). Braathens SAFE 50 år: Mot alle odds. Oslo. ISBN 82-990400-1-9.
