= Hofland =

Hofland is a Dutch toponymic surname. Notable people with the surname include:

- Barbara Hofland (1770–1844), English writer
- Henk Hofland (1927–2016), Dutch journalist, columnist and writer
- Kevin Hofland (born 1979), Dutch footballer
- Mona Hofland (1929–2010), Norwegian actress
- Moreno Hofland (born 1991), Dutch cyclist
- Thomas Christopher Hofland (1777–1843), English artist and teacher
- Tineke Hofland (born 1954), Dutch swimmer

== See also ==
- Hoffland, village in Norway
- Hoffland, Nebraska, unincorporated community
