= Vigra Fixed Link =

Series of tunnels and bridges in Norway

Coordinates: 62.4904°N 6.1727°E

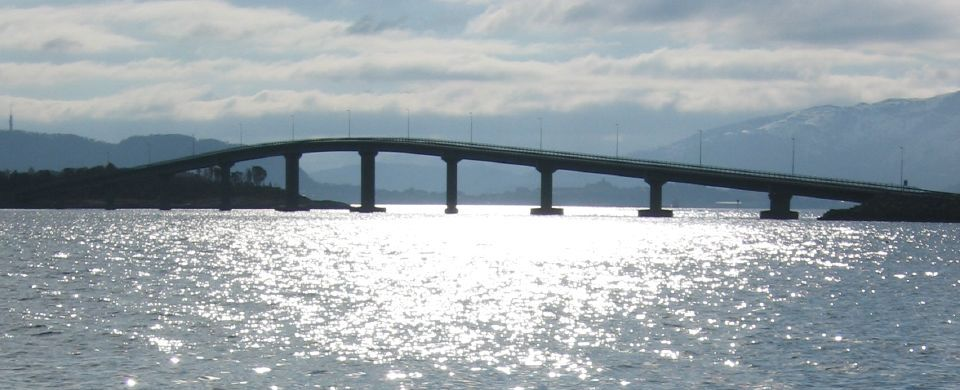
The Giske Bridge connects Giske with Valderøy

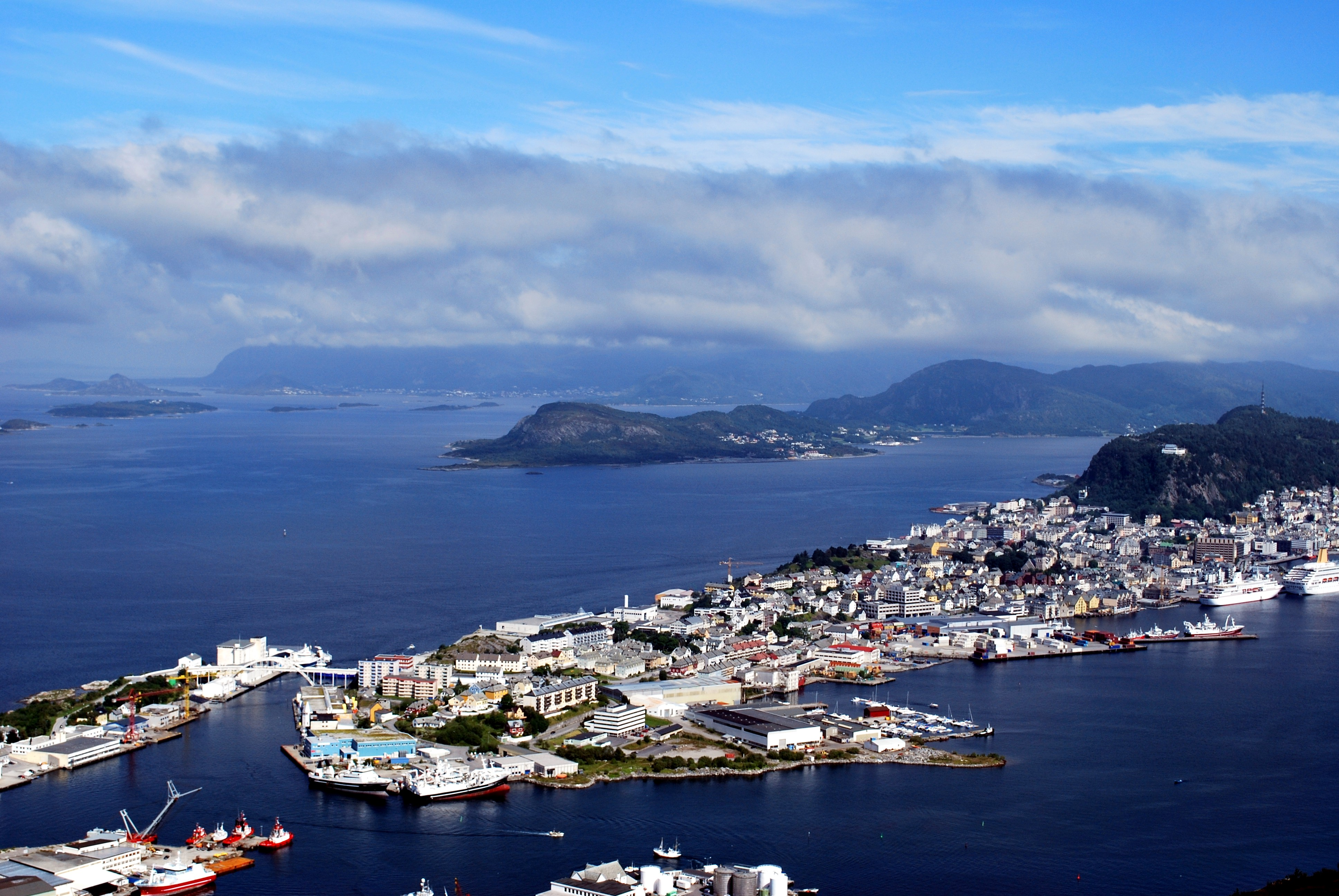
The tunnels run from Ålesund in the foreground to Ellingsøya in the background to the right, and to the left onwards to Giske (island)

The Vigra Fixed Link (Norwegian: Vigrasambandet), also known as the Ålesund Tunnels (Ålesundtunnelene), is a fixed link connecting the islands of Giske Municipality to the islands and mainland of Ålesund Municipality.

The Vigra Fixed Link consists of the following parts:

- the 3,520-meter (11,550 ft) long Ellingsøy Tunnel which connects the islands of Nørve (where the city of Ålesund is centred) and Ellingsøya
- the 4,222-meter (13,852 ft) long Valderøy Tunnel which connects the islands of Ellingsøya and Valderøya
- the 3,844-meter (12,612 ft) long Godøy Tunnel which connects the islands of Valderøya and Godøya
- the 552-meter (1,811 ft) long Giske Bridge which connects the islands of Valderøya to Giske

The island of Valderøya was already connected by bridge to the island of Vigra before this project was begun, which meant that the fixed link also connected the city of Ålesund to Ålesund Airport, Vigra. The fixed link opened between 1987 and 1989, and was financed as a toll road. The link is part of Norwegian National Road 658 and Norwegian County Road 658.

== History ==
The two first tunnels, Ellingsøy and Valderøy, and the Giske Bridge were opened by King Olav V on 20 October 1987. The Godøy Tunnel opened two years later. The project was among the first subsea tunnels in Norway.

The project cost 780 million kr, all of which was financed by debt taken up by the partially publicly owned company Ålesund og Giske Tunnel- og Brusamband AS. The fixed link received a concession to collect tolls for 22 years. The project was built in a period with much optimism, and the banks were more than willing to lend large sums for the project. However, by the time the project was finished, the interest rate had increased to 16.5%, and the toll company could not pay the interest, let alone the principal sum. By 1990, the company was nearly bankrupt, but was saved by an agreement with the banks. Other factors contributing to the financial problems was the choice late in the project to include the Giske Bridge and Godøy Tunnel, as well as lower traffic than estimated.

When the tolls were removed on 25 October 2009, drivers had paid 1.37 billion kr, while the company still had 1.38 billion kr in outstanding debt. As the tunnels are owned by the Norwegian Public Roads Administration, the concession has run out, and the company has no assets, the debt capital is lost for the banks. The financial difficulties was one of the main reasons that Sunnmørsbanken went bankrupt in the early 1990s. Other banks that have lost capital include Bankenes Sikringsfond, DnB NOR, Nordea, Fokus Bank, Sparebanken Møre, and Ørsta Sparebank. An upgrade in 2008 and 2009 of the Ellingsøy and Valderøy tunnels was completed on 10 October 2009. The upgrades cost 448 million kr, which included better fire protection. During parts of the reconstruction, the tunnels were closed and a ferry was put into service from Ålesund to Valderøya and Ellingsøya.
