= Hoffland =

Village in Ålesund Municipality, Norway

Hovland Hoffland
- Village
- Interactive map of Hovland; Hoffland
- Location within Møre og Romsdal Location within Norway
- Coordinates: 62.4953°N 6.1988°E
- Country: Norway
- Region: Western Norway
- County: Møre og Romsdal
- District: Sunnmøre
- Municipality: Ålesund Municipality

Area
  - Total: 0.46 km^{2} (0.18 sq mi)
- Elevation: 27 m (89 ft)

Population (2024)
  - Total: 963
  - Density: 2,093/km^{2} (5,420/sq mi)
- Time zone: UTC+01:00 (CET)
  - Summer (DST): UTC+02:00 (CEST)
- Post Code: 6057 Ellingsøy

Hoffland or Hovland is a village in Ålesund Municipality in Møre og Romsdal county, Norway. The village is located on the western end of the island of Ellingsøya, about 3 kilometres (1.9 mi) northeast of the town of Ålesund and about 5 kilometres (3.1 mi) west of the village of Myklebust.

The 0.46-square-kilometre (110-acre) village has a population (2024) of 963 and a population density of 2,093 inhabitants per square kilometre (5,420/sq mi). It is located at the entrance to two undersea tunnels. The Ellingsøy Tunnel leads to the city of Ålesund on the nearby island of Nørve and the Valderøy Tunnel leads to the island of Valderøya in neighboring Giske Municipality.

Ole Brunes, a native of Hoffland, was among a group of fishermen of primarily Scandinavian ancestry who in the late 1880s founded the community of Hovland, Minnesota which he named for his Norwegian place of origin. Of similar origin is also the community of Hoffland, Nebraska.
