= Rødølstunnelen =

Subsea tunnel in Norway

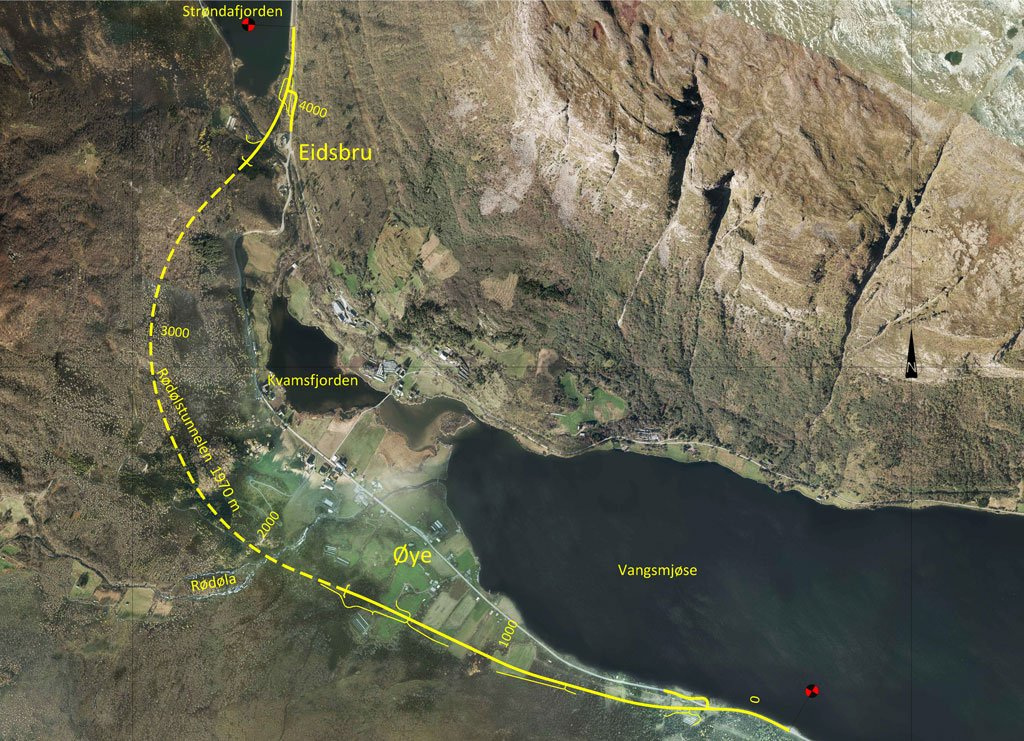
- Map of the road route Eidsbru-Øye on the E16 in Vang, Valdres.

Overview
- Other name(s): transl. Rødol Tunnel
- Location: Vang Municipality
- Coordinates: 61.173174°N 8.382499°E
- Route: European route E16

Operation
- Opened: 23 September 2020

Technical
- Length: 2,100 metres (6,900 ft)

Rødølstunnelen (transl. Rødøl Tunnel) is a tunnel on European Route 16 in Vang Municipality in Innlandet county, Norway.

== Background ==
The tunnel was opened by transport minister Knut Arild Hareide on 23 September 2020. It is 1,970 metres (6,460 ft) and runs through the mountain Kvamsnøse between Øyer by Vangsmjøse and the Strondafjorden. The tunnel was completed on 10 November 2017. The tunnel is part of the upgrading of the E16 over Filefjell between Valdres and Lærdal Municipality. It replaces an older part of the route that ran through the center of Øyer and was of a poor standard, i.e. with several hairpin bends to avoid too high a percentage of road gradient between Vangsmjøse and Strondafjorden. The tunnel runs under the river Rødøla.

The opening was planned for December 2019, but was postponed after delays related to electrical installations.

== See also ==
- List of tunnels in Norway
- List of subsea tunnels in Norway
