= Myklebost, Ålesund =

Village in Ålesund Municipality, Norway

Myklebost Myklebust
- Village
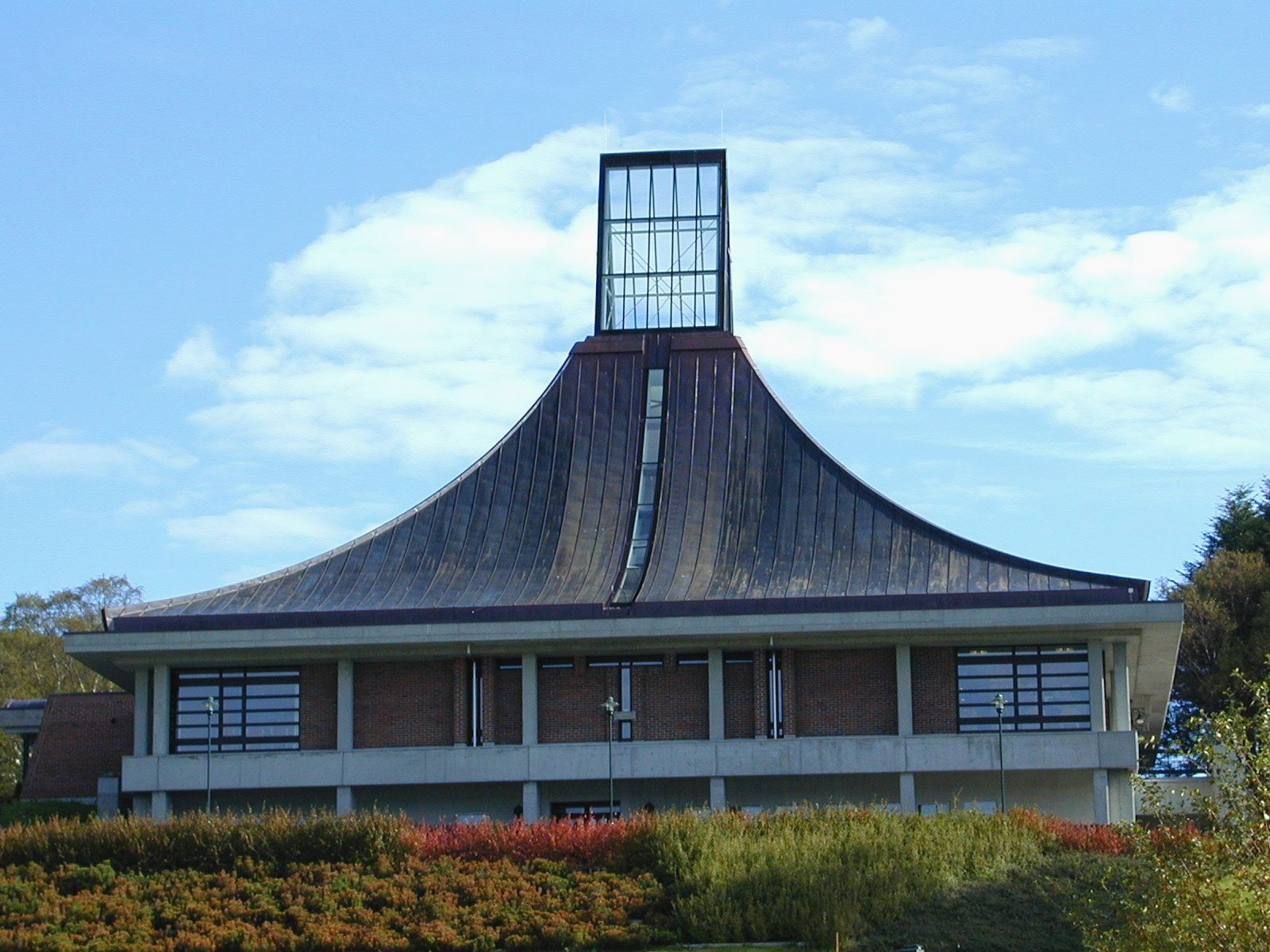
- Ellingsøy church seen from the west
- Interactive map of Myklebost; Myklebust
- Location within Møre og Romsdal Location within Norway
- Coordinates: 62.4923°N 6.2904°E
- Country: Norway
- Region: Western Norway
- County: Møre og Romsdal
- District: Sunnmøre
- Municipality: Ålesund Municipality

Area
  - Total: 0.38 km^{2} (0.15 sq mi)
- Elevation: 51 m (167 ft)

Population (2024)
  - Total: 304
  - Density: 800/km^{2} (2,100/sq mi)
- Time zone: UTC+01:00 (CET)
  - Summer (DST): UTC+02:00 (CEST)
- Post Code: 6057 Ellingsøy

Myklebust or Myklebost is a village in Ålesund Municipality in Møre og Romsdal county, Norway. It is located on the south side of the island of Ellingsøya, about 4 kilometres (2.5 mi) west of the village of Årset and about 5 kilometres (3.1 mi) east of the village of Hoffland. Myklebost is about 10 kilometres (6.2 mi) northeast of the city center of Ålesund.

The 0.38-square-kilometre (94-acre) village has a population (2024) of 304 and a population density of 800 inhabitants per square kilometre (2,100/sq mi). Ellingsøy Church is located just west of the village of Myklebost.
