= Volsdalen Church =

- Volsdalen kirke
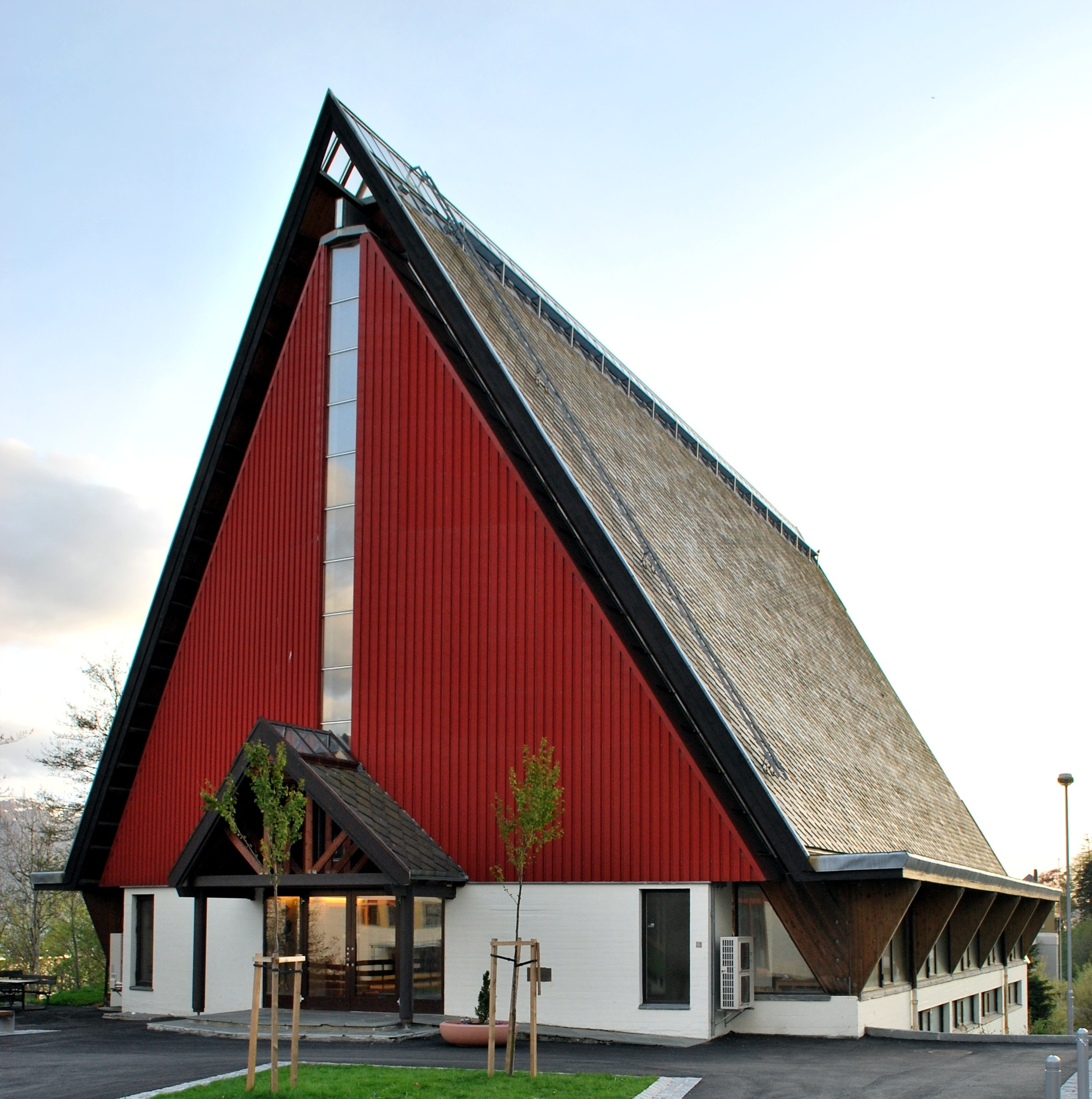
- View of the church
- Volsdalen Church
- 62°28′17″N 6°11′19″E
- Location: Ålesund Municipality, Møre og Romsdal
- Country: Norway
- Denomination: Church of Norway
- Churchmanship: Evangelical Lutheran

History
- Status: Parish church
- Founded: 1964
- Consecrated: 19 May 1974

Architecture
- Functional status: Active
- Architect: Leif Olav Moen
- Architectural type: Rectangular
- Completed: 1974 (52 years ago)

Specifications
- Capacity: 500
- Materials: Wood

Administration
- Diocese: Møre bispedømme
- Deanery: Nordre Sunnmøre prosti
- Parish: Ålesund and Volsdalen
- Norwegian Cultural Heritage Site
- Type: Church
- Status: Not protected
- ID: 85867

Volsdalen Church (Norwegian: Volsdalen kyrkje) is a parish church of the Church of Norway in Ålesund Municipality in Møre og Romsdal county, Norway. It is located on the south side of the island of Nørvøya in the town of Ålesund. It is one of the three churches for Ålesund and Volsdalen parish which is part of the Nordre Sunnmøre prosti (deanery) in the Diocese of Møre. The red, wooden church was built in a rectangular design in 1974 using plans drawn up by the architect Leif Olav Moen. The church seats about 500 people.

== History ==
In 1957, planning began for a church for Volsdalen area to the east of the city centre of Ålesund. An architectural competition for the design of the new church was won by Leif Olav Moen. Construction for a new church was delayed due to a lack of funding. An interim church building was consecrated in 1964 for temporary use. In 1965, the Volsdalen area was separated from the Ålesund Church parish and it was established as a new parish of Volsdalen. In the 1970s, the builder and seafaring priest Bjørn Siem accelerated matters. He reworked the drawings to reduce costs, and a lot of volunteer work was done to construct the new church. The building was completed in 1974 and it was consecrated on 19 May 1974.

== Media gallery ==
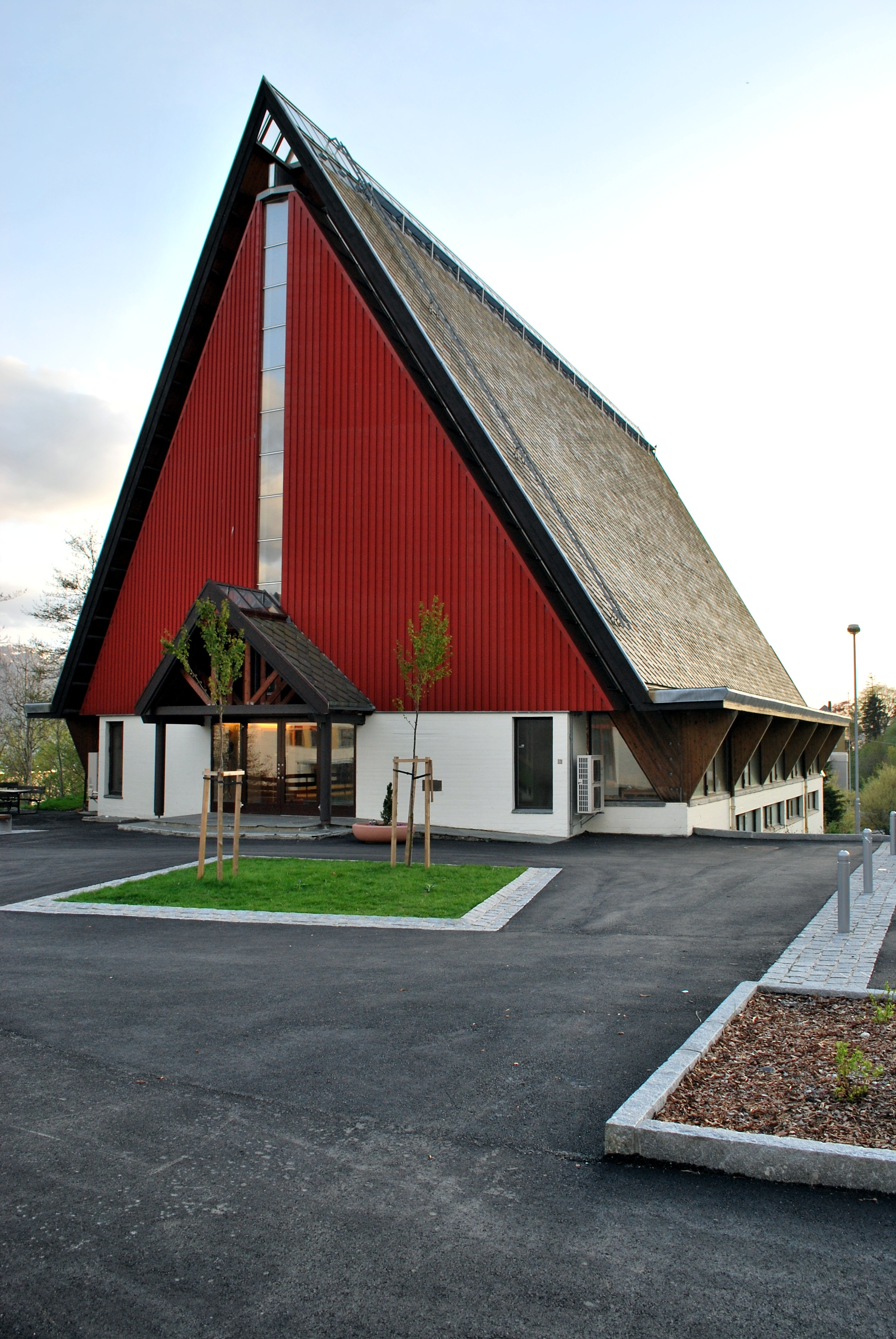

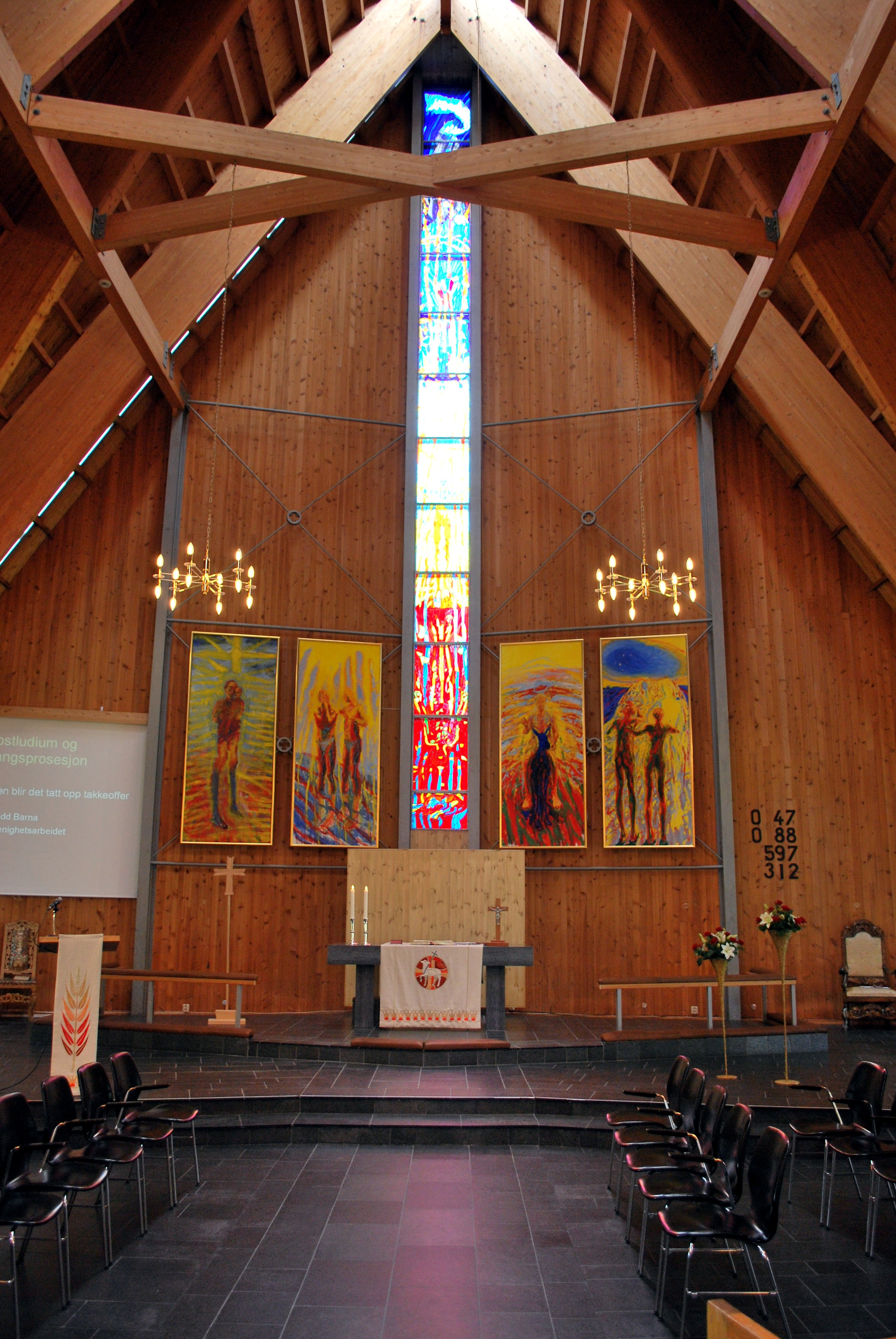

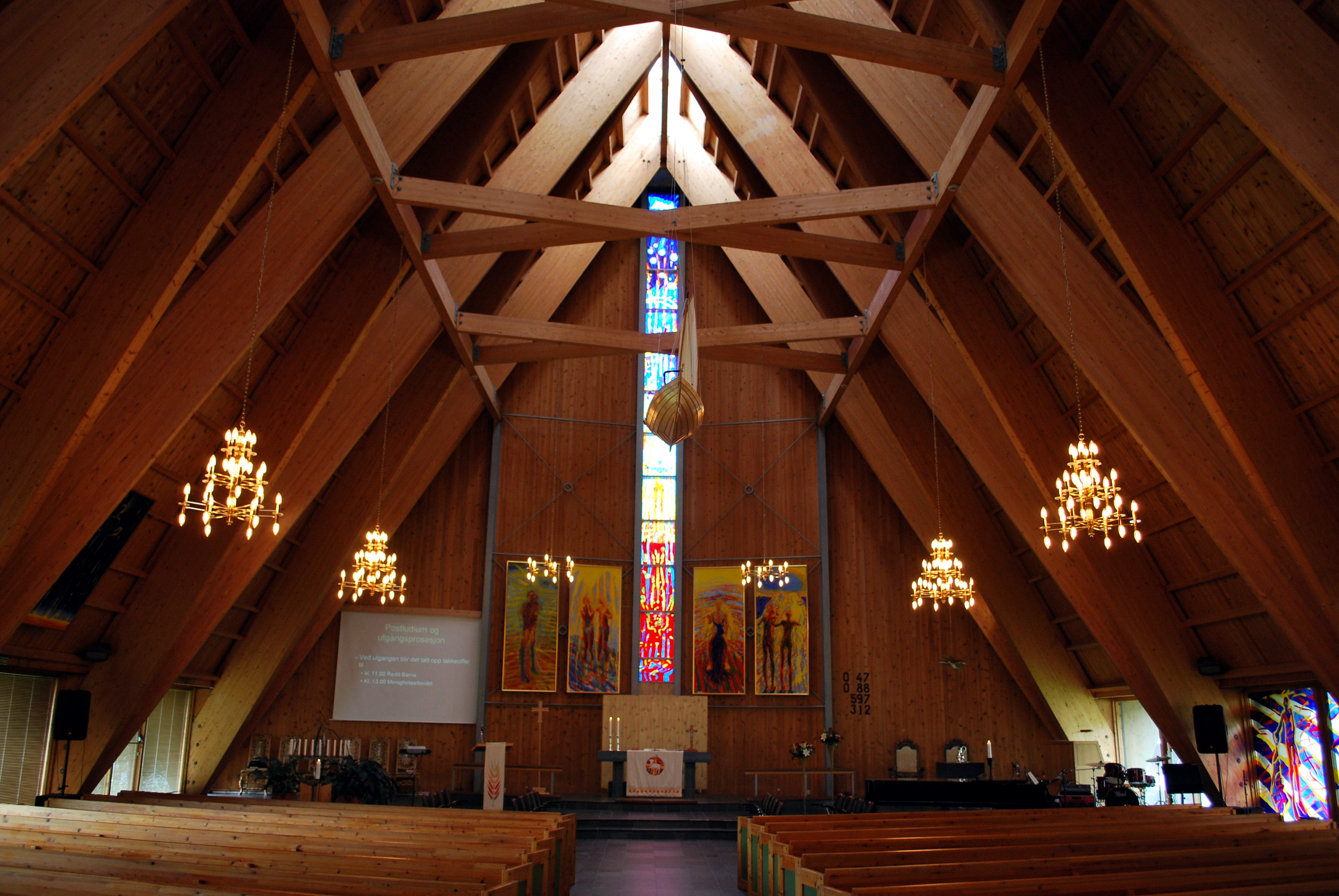

== See also ==
- List of churches in Møre
