= Kenneth Giske =

Norwegian footballer (born 1976)

Personal information
- Date of birth: 6 January 1976 (age 50)
- Position: Midfielder

Youth career
- Valder

Senior career*
Years	Team	Apps	(Gls)
–1992	Valder		
1993–1995	Hødd		
1996	Lillestrøm	13	(1)
1997–1998	Hødd	40	(0)
1999–2000	Bryne	18	(0)
2001	Randaberg		
2001–2003	Bryne	42	(1)
2004–2005	Hødd	26	(0)
2006	Klepp		
2008	Valder		
2009	Klepp		
2010–2012	Kåsen		

International career
1991	Norway u-15	6	(1)
1992	Norway u-16	2	(0)
1993	Norway u-17	8	(0)
1994	Norway u-18	3	(1)
1995–1996	Norway u-21	3	(0)

Managerial career
- 2006: Klepp
- 2019–: Bryne (junior team)
- * Club domestic league appearances and goals

Kenneth Giske (born 6 January 1976) is a retired Norwegian football midfielder.

He started his career in Valder IL and represented Norway as a youth international. He joined IL Hødd ahead of the 1993 season. After good performances, he was signed by Lillestrøm SK. Never breaking through there, he returned to Hødd until he was picked up by Bryne FK in 1999. Struggling with injuries, in 2001 he signed for lowly Randaberg IL, but was again given the chance at Bryne in the summer of 2001.

In 2006 he was player-manager of Klepp IL, but the team was relegated from the 2006 2. divisjon. He later featured on the pitch for Valder, Klepp and Kåsen before finally retiring in the end of 2012.

In 2019 he became coach of Bryne's junior team.
