= IL Valder =

Norwegian sports club

- Full name: Idrettslaget Valder
- Founded: 25 August 1956
- Ground: Valdervoll, Valderøy
- League: 4th Division
Home colours

Idrettslaget Valder is a Norwegian sports club from Valderøya in Giske Municipality in Møre og Romsdal county. It has sections for association football, team handball and track and field.

It was founded on 25 August 1956.

The men's football team currently plays in the 4th Division, the fifth tier of Norwegian football. Former players include Svein Ola Egseth, Andre Ulla, Kenneth Giske, Erlend Holm and Henrik Bjørdal

== Current squad ==
Note: Flags indicate national team as defined under FIFA eligibility rules; some limited exceptions apply. Players may hold more than one non-FIFA nationality.

No.	Pos.	Nation	Player
1	GK	NOR	Johannes Lovund
2	DF	NOR	Øystein Wiik Kristiansen
3	DF	NOR	Tobias Westerlund Blindheim
4	DF	NOR	Gaute Hjellbakk Pettersen
5	DF	NOR	Sindre Wollstad
6	DF	NOR	Christer Klemetsen Bakken
7	DF	NOR	Oskar Telvik
8	FW	NOR	Glen Ørjan Johannessen
9	FW	NOR	Ulrik Giske Holm
10	FW	NOR	Henrik Hole Oksnes
11	MF	NOR	Steffen Oksnes Elde
12	GK	NOR	Sven Jakob Nordstrand
13	MF	NOR	Mikal Farstad Dyb
14	FW	NOR	Stian René Giske
15	FW	NOR	Mathias Leander Godø Dyb
16	MF	NOR	Preben Skaugseth Valderhaug
17	MF	BRA	Emil Emerson Jenssen
18	DF	VEN	Luis Fernando Klauset
19	DF	NOR	Vegard Mauren Richardsen
20	MF	NOR	Erlend Synnes Skjong
24	MF	NOR	Joakim Oksnes Austnes
25	MF	SOM	Shafi Mahdi Elmi

== Recent history ==
Year	Division	Pos	Pl	W	D	L	GD	+/-	Pts	Note
1999	4th Division	5th	22	10	2	10	53-42	+11	32/66	
2000	4th Division	11th	22	2	7	13	36-66	-30	13/66	
2001	5th Division	2nd	20	15	0	5	68-25	+43	45/60	
2002	4th Division	8th	22	9	4	9	60-54	+6	31/66	
2003	4th Division	1st	22	16	3	3	70-37	+33	51/66	
2004	3rd Division	2nd	22	12	2	8	57-41	+16	38/66	
2005	3rd Division	8th	22	8	1	13	43-65	-22	25/66	
2006	3rd Division	10th	22	7	5	10	28-49	-21	26/66	
2007	3rd Division	10th	22	6	4	12	37-63	-26	22/66	
2008	3rd Division	7th	22	9	4	9	37-49	-12	31/66	
2009	3rd Division	6th	22	10	3	9	51-62	-11	33/66	
2010	3rd Division	8th	22	7	4	11	45-60	-15	25/66	
2011	4th Division	3rd	22	13	3	6	70-39	+31	42/66	
2012	4th Division	2nd	22	14	3	5	69-35	+34	45/66	
2013	4th Division	3rd	22	13	3	6	64-46	+18	42/66	
2014	4th Division	4th	22	9	6	7	52-37	+15	33/66	
