= Giske Bridge =

Giske Bridge Giskebrua
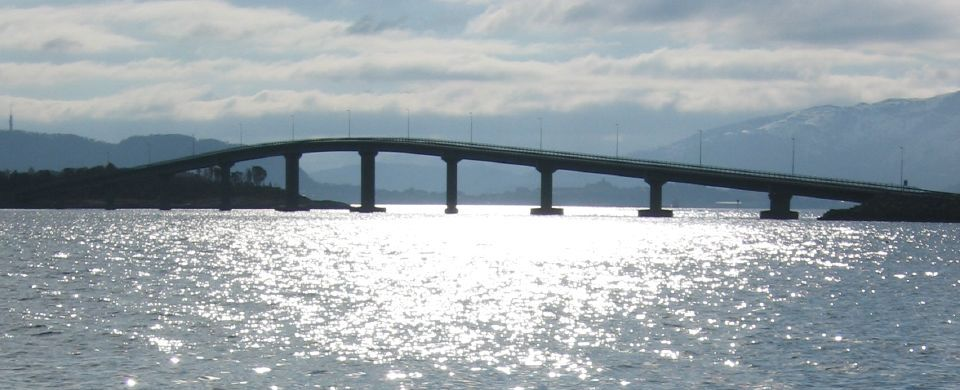
- View of the Giske Bridge
- Coordinates: 62°30′28″N 06°04′37″E
- Carries: Fv658
- Locale: Giske Municipality, Norway

Characteristics
- Total length: 552 m (1,811 ft)
- Longest span: 52 m (171 ft)
- No. of spans: 11
- Clearance below: 17 m (56 ft)

History
- Opened: 1987

Location
- Interactive map of Giske Bridge

The Giske Bridge (Norwegian: Giskebrua) is a concrete beam bridge between the islands of Valderøya and Giske in Giske Municipality in Møre og Romsdal county, Norway. The bridge is 552 metres (1,811 ft) long, the longest span is 52 metres (171 ft), and the maximum clearance to the sea is 17 metres (56 ft). The bridge has 11 spans.

Giske Bridge was opened in 1987 and had a toll until 2009. Together with the nearby undersea tunnels, the bridge is part of the Vigra Fixed Link which connects the islands of Giske Municipality with the nearby city of Ålesund.

== See also ==
- List of bridges in Norway
- List of bridges in Norway by length
- List of bridges
- List of bridges by length
