= Årset, Ålesund =

Village in Ålesund Municipality, Norway

Årset
- Village
- Interactive map of Årset
- Location within Møre og Romsdal Location within Norway
- Coordinates: 62.4985°N 6.3801°E
- Country: Norway
- Region: Western Norway
- County: Møre og Romsdal
- District: Sunnmøre
- Municipality: Ålesund Municipality

Area
  - Total: 0.56 km^{2} (0.22 sq mi)
- Elevation: 22 m (72 ft)

Population (2024)
  - Total: 861
  - Density: 1,538/km^{2} (3,980/sq mi)
- Time zone: UTC+01:00 (CET)
  - Summer (DST): UTC+02:00 (CEST)
- Post Code: 6057 Ellingsøy

Årset is a village in Ålesund Municipality in Møre og Romsdal county, Norway. The village is located along the Ellingsøyfjorden on the southern shore of the island of Ellingsøya (northeast of the city center of Ålesund), about 4 kilometres (2.5 mi) east of the village of Myklebust and about 12 kilometres (7.5 mi) west of the village of Tennfjord in Haram Municipality.

The 0.56-square-kilometre (140-acre) village has a population (2024) of 861 and a population density of 1,538 inhabitants per square kilometre (3,980/sq mi).
