= Ellingsøy Church =

- Ellingsøy kyrkje
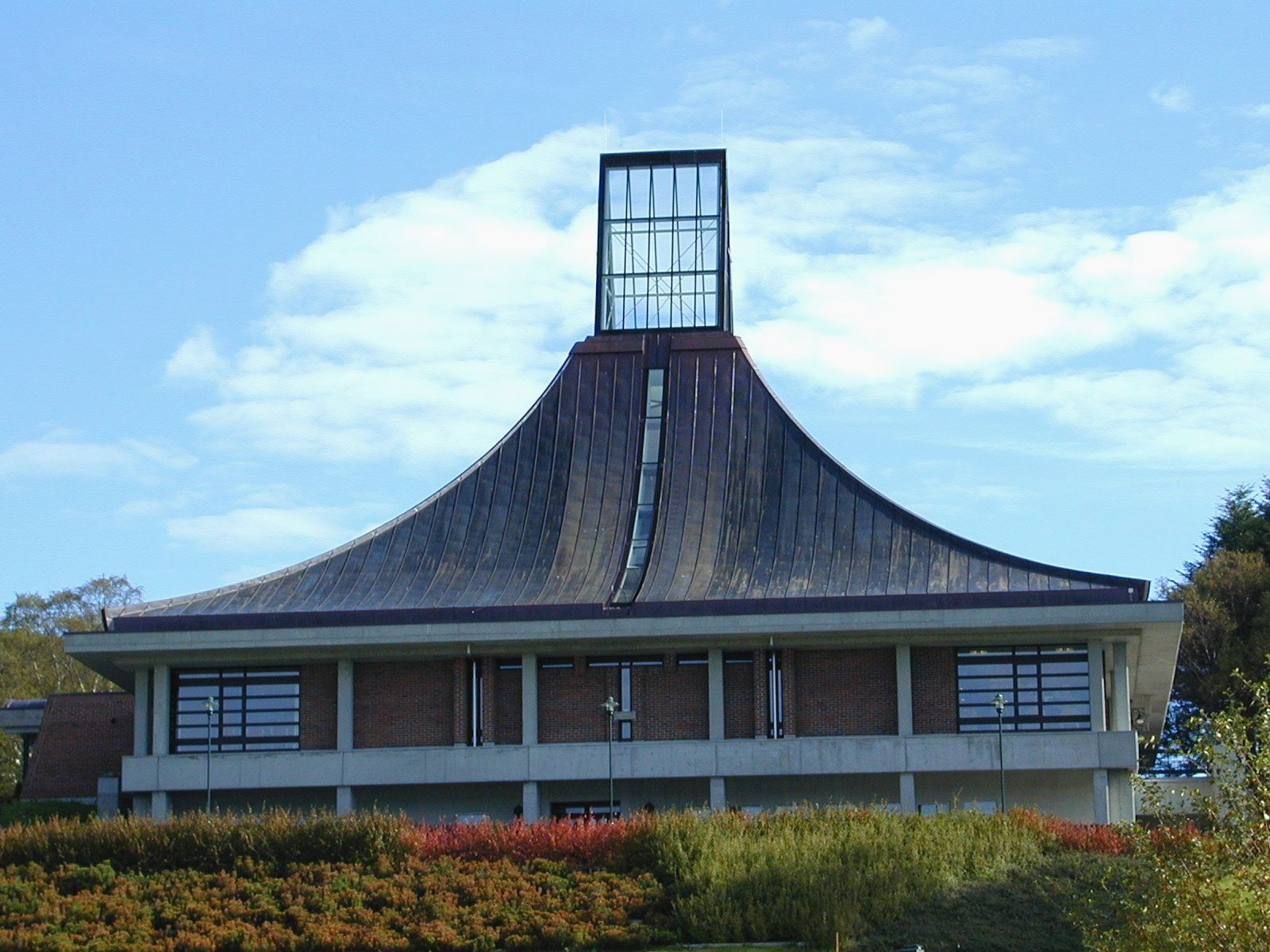
- View of the church
- Ellingsøy Church
- 62°29′32″N 6°16′18″E
- Location: Ålesund Municipality, Møre og Romsdal
- Country: Norway
- Denomination: Church of Norway
- Churchmanship: Evangelical Lutheran

History
- Status: Parish church
- Founded: 1990
- Consecrated: 30 August 1998

Architecture
- Functional status: Active
- Architect: Lauritz Nes
- Architectural type: Fan-shaped
- Completed: 1990 (36 years ago)

Specifications
- Capacity: 380
- Materials: Concrete

Administration
- Diocese: Møre bispedømme
- Deanery: Nordre Sunnmøre prosti
- Parish: Ellingsøy
- Norwegian Cultural Heritage Site
- Type: Church
- Status: Not protected
- ID: 227395

Ellingsøy Church (Norwegian: Ellingsøy kyrkje) is a parish church of the Church of Norway in Ålesund Municipality in Møre og Romsdal county, Norway. It is located on the island of Ellingsøya, just west of the village of Myklebost. It is the church for the Ellingsøy parish which is part of the Nordre Sunnmøre prosti (deanery) in the Diocese of Møre. The brick church was built in a fan-shaped design in 1990 using plans drawn up by the architect Lauritz Nes. The church seats about 380 people.

== History ==
The brick church was built in 1990 by the architect Lauritz Nes and it originally was a chapel for the parish. In 1998, the chapel was expanded by the architect Oskar Norderval and it was consecrated as a church on 30 August 1998.

== See also ==
- List of churches in Møre
