= T-Link =

Road project in Rogaland, Norway

The T-Link (Norwegian: T-forbindelsen) is a road/bridge/tunnel project in Rogaland, Norway which took four years to build. It consists of the 8.9-kilometer (5.5 mi) long Karmøy Tunnel, which connects the island of Karmøy with European Route E39 in Tysvær, and a 9.8-kilometer (6.1 mi) section of road from a roundabout in the tunnel north to Haugesund. The project includes the 50-metre (160 ft) long Tuastad Bridge, the 687-metre (2,254 ft) long Husafjell Tunnel and the 260-metre (850 ft) long Spannavarden Tunnel.

Construction work began in the autumn of 2009, with the opening of T-forbindelsen occurring in September 2013.

== History ==
With the establishment of E39, it was decided that the route would not pass through Karmøy, but instead follow a more inner route via Bokn Municipality and Tysvær Municipality. The Skudeneshavn–Randaberg Ferry was at the same time downgraded, and the Mortavika–Arsvågen Ferry established as the main connection. Combined with the Rennesøy Fixed Link, this gave much shorter ferry times across Boknafjord. The T-Link was proposed to allow better access southwards towards Jæren, while at the same time providing faster travel time between Kopervik to Haugesund.

The project is estimated to cost 1.5 billion Norwegian krone (NOK) and was initially approved by the Parliament of Norway in 2001, which included that 60% of the tolls would be pre-collected on the Mortavika–Arsvågen Ferry. This gave an annual income of NOK 60 million. The remaining 40% will be collected from the uses as a toll. Financing (in 2008 NOK) included 405 million in state grants, 817 million from user payments, 39 million in municipal advances, 95 from Karmøy Municipality and 84 million from Rogaland County Municipality. The road tolls are NOK 22 for cars and NOK 44 for trucks.
