= Rya Tunnel =

Road tunnel in Tromsø, Norway

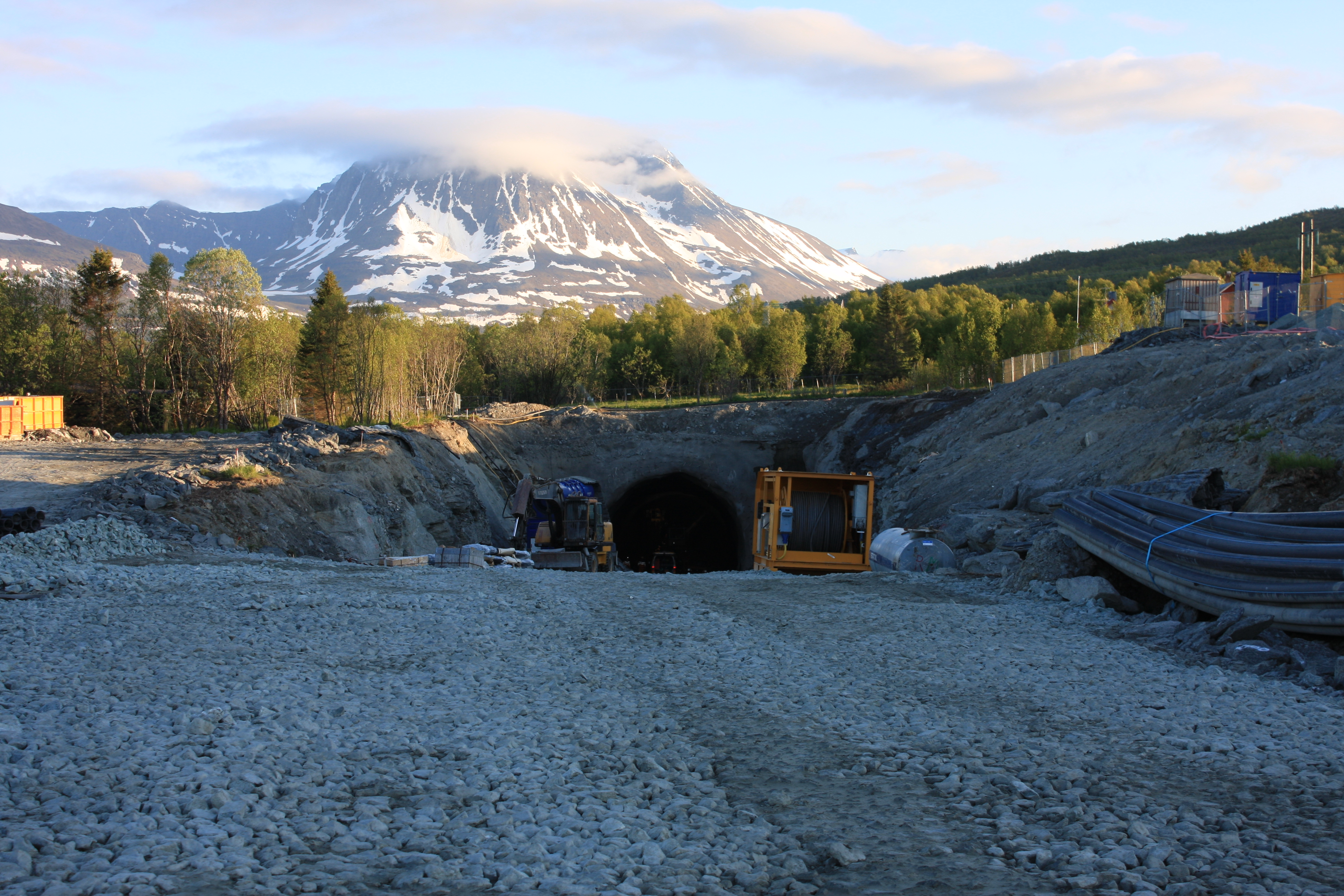
- Interactive map of Rya Tunnel

Overview
- Location: Tromsø, Troms, Norway
- Coordinates: 69°34′02″N 018°48′02″E
- Status: In use
- Route: Fv858
- Start: Larseng
- End: Balsnesodden

Operation
- Work began: March 2009
- Opened: 29 September 2011
- Operator: Statens vegvesen
- Character: Automotive
- Toll: Toll until 2030

Technical
- Length: 2,675 metres (1.7 mi)
- No. of lanes: 2
- Operating speed: 80 km/h (50 mph)
- Min elevation: −87 metres (−285 ft)
- Grade: 7.8%

The Rya Tunnel (Norwegian: Ryaforbindelsen or Ryatunnelen) is a subsea road tunnel in Tromsø Municipality in Troms county, Norway. The tunnel links the island of Kvaløya to the mainland Malangshalvøya peninsula. Located along Norwegian County Road 858, the tunnel runs under Straumsfjorden between the village of Larseng (on Kvaløya) and the Balsnes area on the mainland. The 2,675-metre (8,776 ft) long tunnel reaches a maximum depth of 87 metres (285 ft) below mean sea level and has a maximum grade of 7.8%. The two-lane tunnel opened on 29 September 2011 and cost about 250 million kr, part of which will be recouped by tolls until 2030. It is open to cyclists since fall 2013.
