= Nørve =

Island in Møre og Romsdal, Norway

Nørve Nørvøya
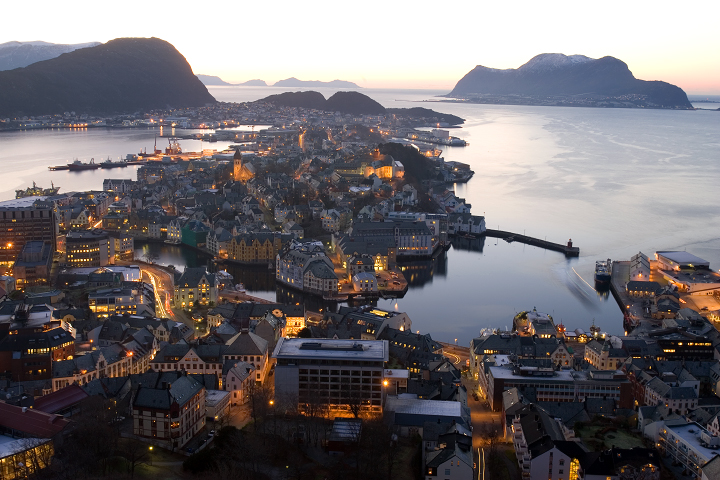
- View of the island
- Interactive map of Nørve; Nørvøya

Geography
- Location: Møre og Romsdal, Norway
- Coordinates: 62.4753°N 6.2029°E
- Area: 5 km^{2} (1.9 sq mi)
- Length: 5.7 km (3.54 mi)
- Width: 1.2 km (0.75 mi)
- Highest elevation: 135 m (443 ft)
- Highest point: Aksla

Administration
- Norway
- County: Møre og Romsdal
- Municipality: Ålesund Municipality

Demographics
- Population: 9647 (2015)

Nørve (or Nørvøya) is an island in Ålesund Municipality in Møre og Romsdal county, Norway. It is the largest of the islands containing the city center of Ålesund, the others being Aspøya and Hessa, located to the west. The 5-square-kilometre (1.9 sq mi) island of Nørve is located south of Ellingsøya, north of Sula, and west of Uksenøya. There were 9,647 residents living on the island in 2015.

Ålesund University College, the municipal hall, Volsdalen Church, and the stadium of the local association football team Aalesunds FK are located on Nørvøya. The 135-metre (443 ft) hill Aksla, a popular place from where to photograph the city, is located on the western part of Nørvøya. The European route E136 highway runs along the south side of the island, connecting it to the other islands of Uksenøya (on the east) and Aspøya (on the west). On Nørve, the E136 highway connects to the Ellingsøy Tunnel, which is an undersea tunnel that connects to the village of Hoffland on Ellingsøya to the north.

== See also ==
- List of islands of Norway
