= Karmøy Tunnel =

Subsea road tunnel in Norway

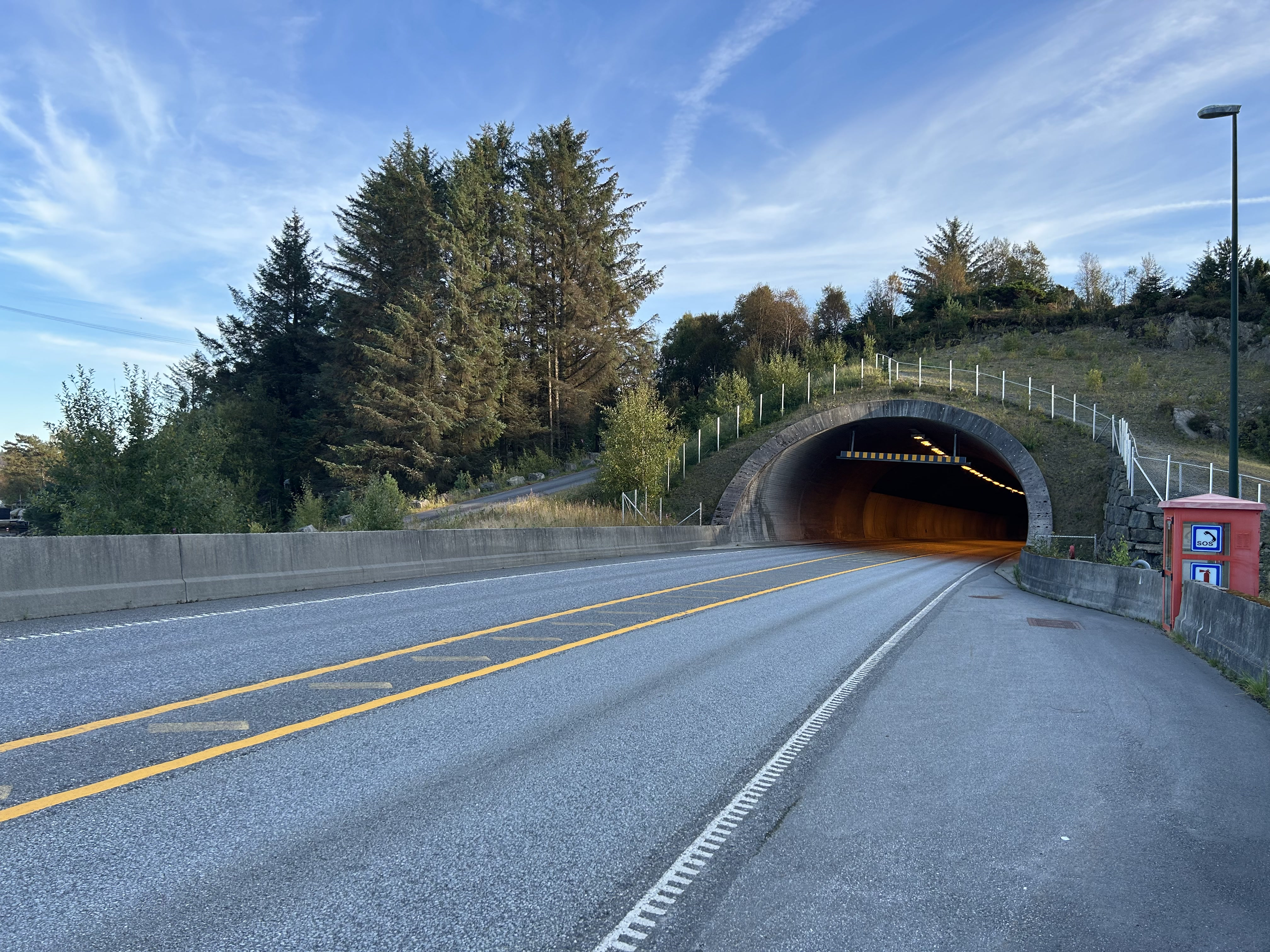
- Entrance to the tunnel
- Interactive map of Karmøy Tunnel

Overview
- Location: Rogaland, Norway
- Coordinates: 59.3145°N 5.3632°E
- Status: In use
- Route: Fv47

Operation
- Work began: September 2009
- Opened: 5 September 2013
- Operator: Statens vegvesen

Technical
- Length: 8.9 kilometres (5.5 mi)
- Min elevation: −139 metres (−456 ft)
- Grade: 7.4%

The Karmøy Tunnel (Norwegian: Karmøytunnelen) was the longest subsea road tunnel in Norway from 2013 until the opening of Ryfast in 2019, and is located in Karmøy Municipality and Tysvær Municipality in Rogaland county. At 8.9-kilometer (5.5 mi) long, it links the island of Karmøy with the European Route E39 highway on the mainland. The town of Kopervik lies just south of the western end of the tunnel.

The tunnel is a major part of the T-Link project, which is a toll road project that was opened in September 2013. At Fosen, the Karmøy Tunnel has an underground roundabout which connects it to another (much shorter) tunnel which heads north to a highway that leads to the town of Haugesund. The Karmøy Tunnel goes under the Karmsundet strait and the Førresfjorden. The tunnel also goes under the northern edge of the Norsk Hydro facility in Karmøy Municipality.
