= Knappe Tunnel =

Road tunnel in Bergen, Norway

Knappe Tunnel Knappetunnelen
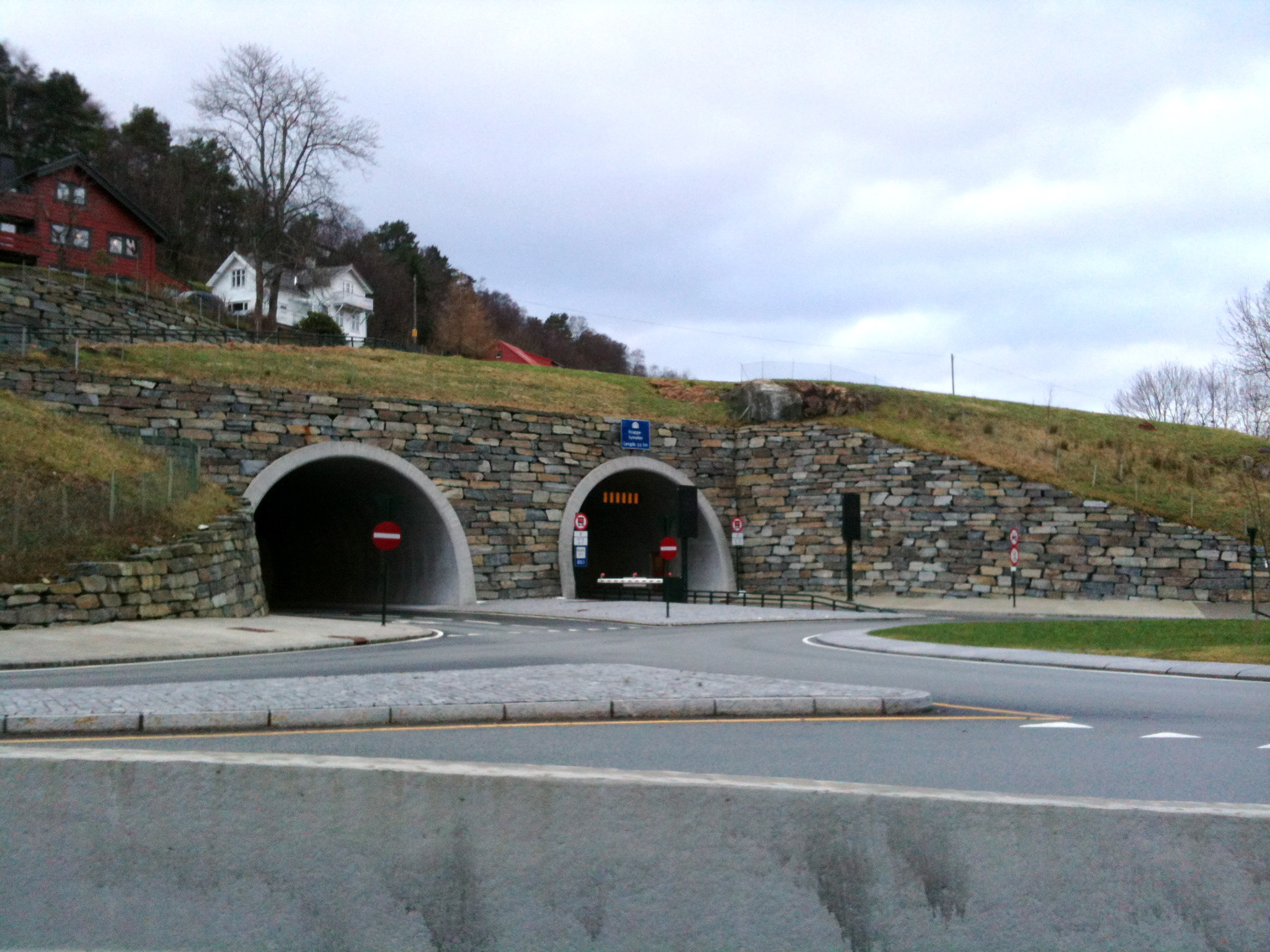
- Interactive map of Knappe Tunnel; Knappetunnelen

Overview
- Location: Bergen, Norway
- Coordinates: 60°19′13″N 005°16′10″E
- Status: In use
- Route: Fv557
- Start: Dolvik
- End: Liavatnet

Operation
- Work began: 2006
- Opened: 10 September 2010 (first stage), 12 November 2015 (second stage)
- Operator: Statens vegvesen

Technical
- Length: 6.4 km (4.0 mi)
- No. of lanes: 2
- Min elevation: −29 metres (−95 ft)

The Knappe Tunnel (Norwegian: Knappetunnelen) is a four-lane, twin-tube motorway tunnel in Bergen Municipality in Vestland county, Norway. The tunnel is part of County Road 557 and consists of the first and second stages of the four-lane motorway project called Ring Road West (Norwegian: Ringvei Vest). The southern part of the tunnel goes under the Nordåsstraumen, a small strait connecting the lake Nordåsvatnet and the Grimstadfjorden.

The tunnel was built in two stages. The first stage, from Dolvik in Søreidgrenda to Sandeide (with a branch heading east to Straume), started in August 2006 and was opened to the public on 10 September 2010. Stage two, from Sandeide to the southern tip of the lake Liavatnet, started in 1st quarter of 2011 and was opened to the public in 12 November 2015. There are two extra exits/entrances to the tunnel (other than the two endpoints of the tunnel). There is a branch that heads east off the main path of the tunnel to connect to the village of Straume, and another branch that connects to the village of Sandeidet/Varden.

The first part of the tunnel is 2.6 kilometres (1.6 mi) long, and the second segment is 2.8 kilometres (1.7 mi) long. In total, the entire tunnel is 6.4 kilometres (4.0 mi) long. The lowest point of the tunnel is under the Nordåsstraumen strait, reaching 29 metres (95 ft) below sea level.
