= Norwegian National Road 706 =

Road in Norway

Coordinates: 63°23′22″N 10°22′47″E

National Road 706
- Bokmål: Riksvei 706; Nynorsk: Riksveg 706

Route information
- Maintained by Central Norway Public Roads Administration

Major junctions
- South end: E6 at Sluppen
- Fv715 in Ilsvika
- East end: E6 at Rotvoll

Location
- Country: Norway
- Counties: Sør-Trøndelag
- Major cities: Trondheim

Highway system
- Roads in Norway; National Roads; County Roads
← Fv705	→ Fv707

National Road 706 (Norwegian: Riksvei 706) is a road running through Trondheim, Norway. It runs from the E6 at Sluppen, runs along Osloveien and then the Marienborg Tunnel to Ilsvika, then runs through Nordre avlastningsvei, including the Ilsvika Tunnel and the Skansen Tunnel, across Nidelv Bridge before following Haakon VII's gate until reaching the E6 at Rotvoll.
