= Hoffland, Nebraska =

Unincorporated community in Sheridan County, Nebraska, United States

- Unincorporated community
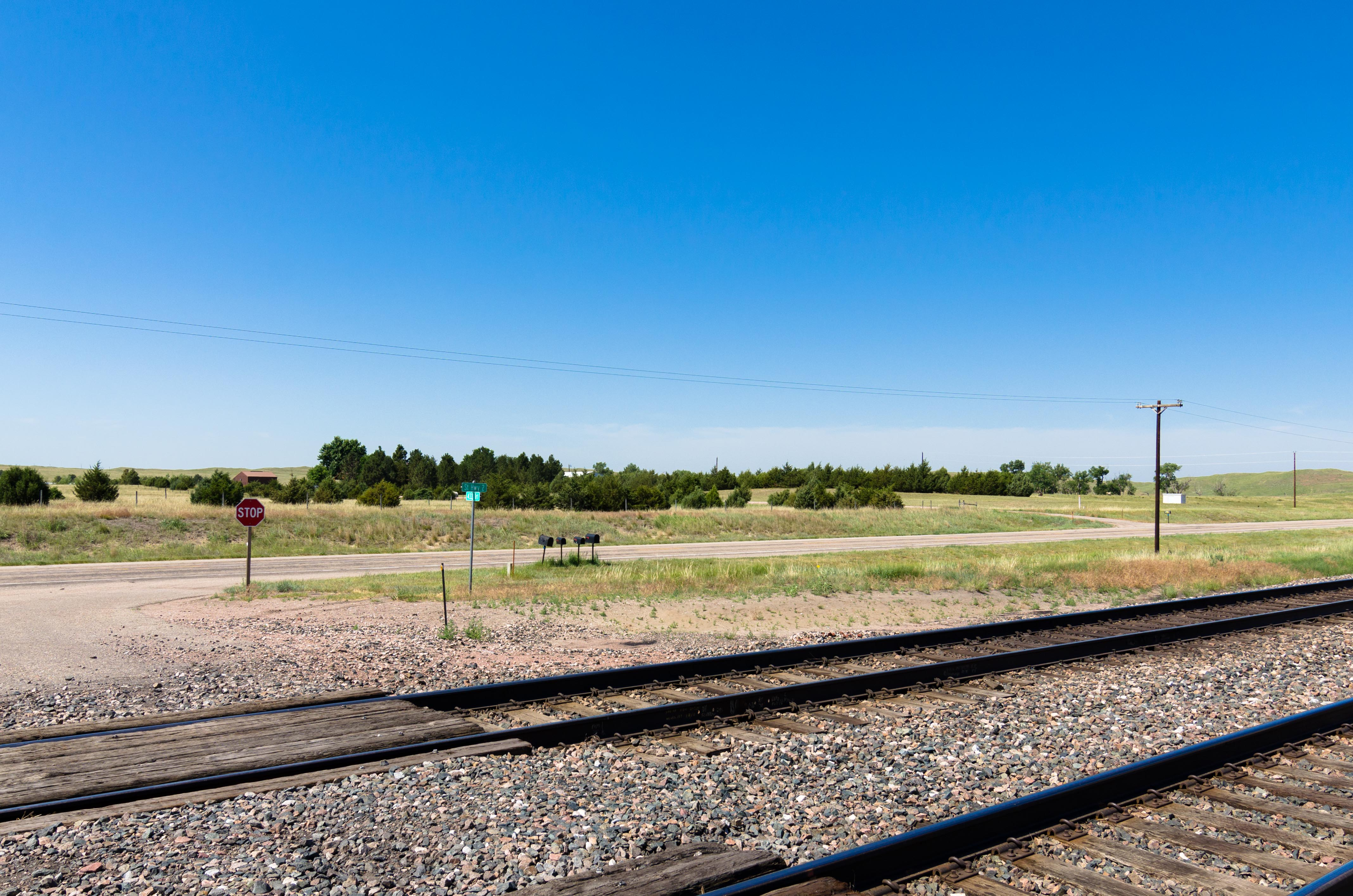
- Hoffland as seen from across Nebraska Highway 2, July 2017

- Location within the state of Nebraska Location within the United States
- Coordinates: 42°04′31″N 102°39′29″W
- Country: United States
- State: Nebraska
- County: Sheridan
- Elevation: 3,914 ft (1,193 m)
- Time zone: UTC-7 (Mountain (MST))
  - Summer (DST): UTC-6 (MDT)
- ZIP code: 69301
- FIPS code: 31-22585
- GNIS feature ID: 835326

Hoffland is an Unincorporated community in Sheridan County, Nebraska, United States.

== History ==
A post office was established at Hoffland in 1916, and remained in operation until it was discontinued in 1927. Hoffland was a station on the Chicago, Burlington and Quincy Railroad.

The community's name is derived from Hoffland in Norway. Of similar origin is the name of Hovland, Minnesota.
