= Skansen Tunnel (Trondheim) =

Tunnel in Trondheim, Norway

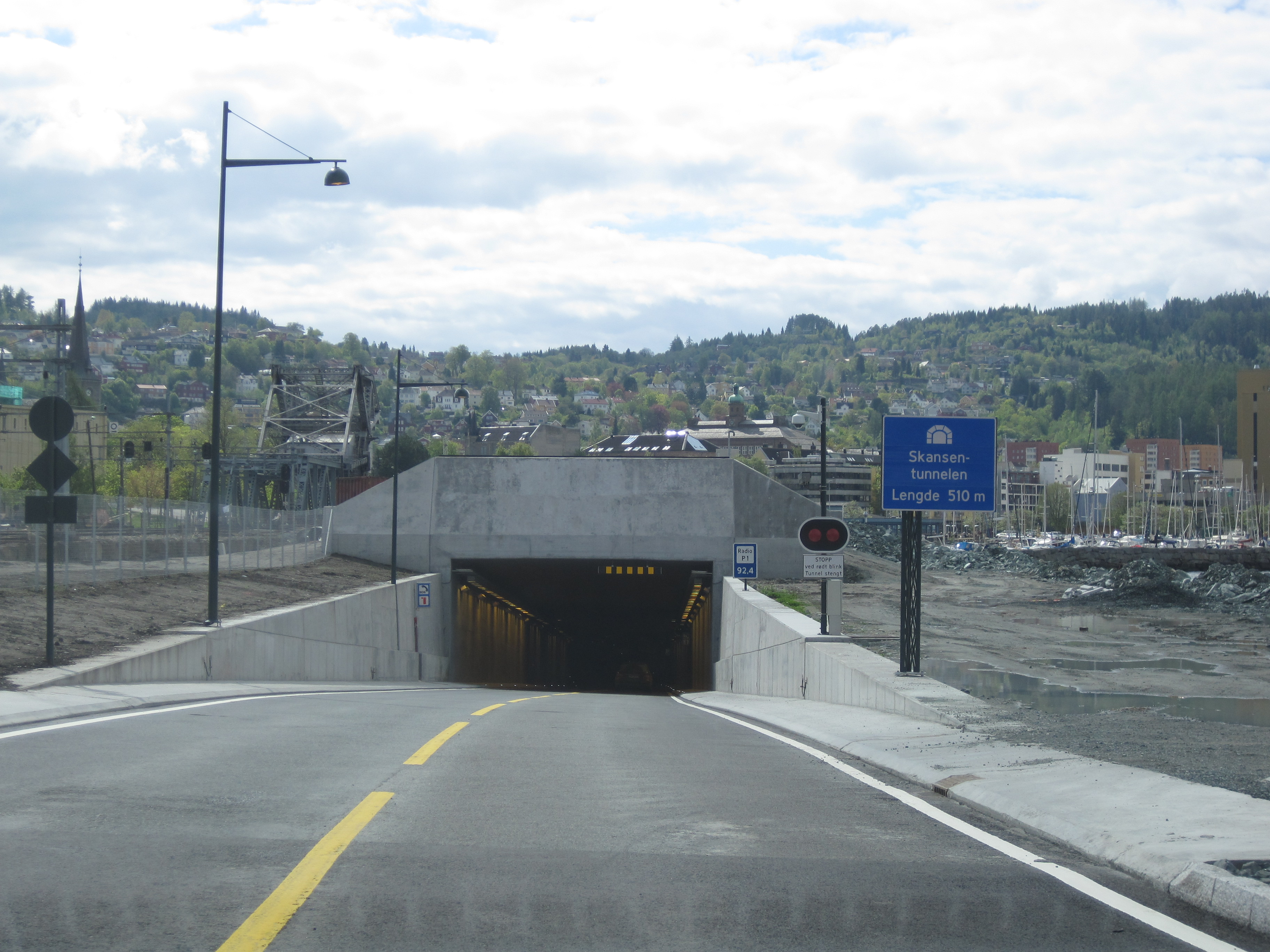
- Entrance from Brattøra
- Interactive map of Skansen Tunnel

Overview
- Location: Trondheim, Sør-Trøndelag, Norway
- Coordinates: 63.4317°N 10.3785°E
- Status: Open
- Route: Rv706

Operation
- Opened: 21 May 2010
- Traffic: Automotive

Technical
- Length: 510 metres (1,670 ft)
- Min elevation: 14 metres (46 ft)

The Skansen Tunnel (Norwegian: Skansentunnelen) is an immersed tube underwater tunnel in the city of Trondheim in Sør-Trøndelag county, Norway. Part of Norwegian National Road 706, it runs from Brattøra to Ila. The tunnel is 510 meters (1,670 ft) long and opened on 27 May 2010.

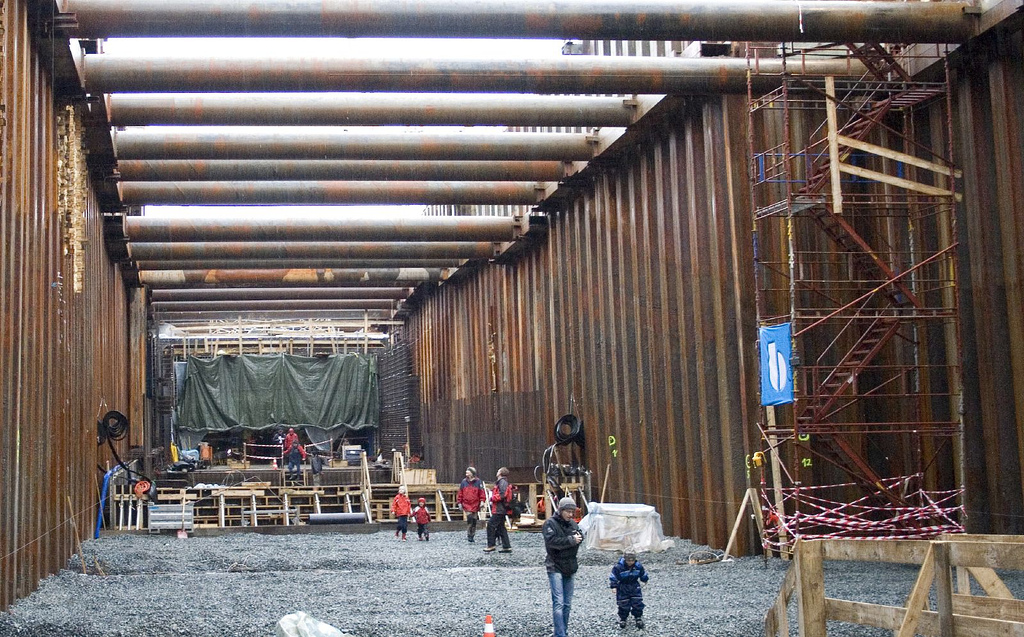
During construction
