= Ellingsøya =

Island in Møre og Romsdal, Norway

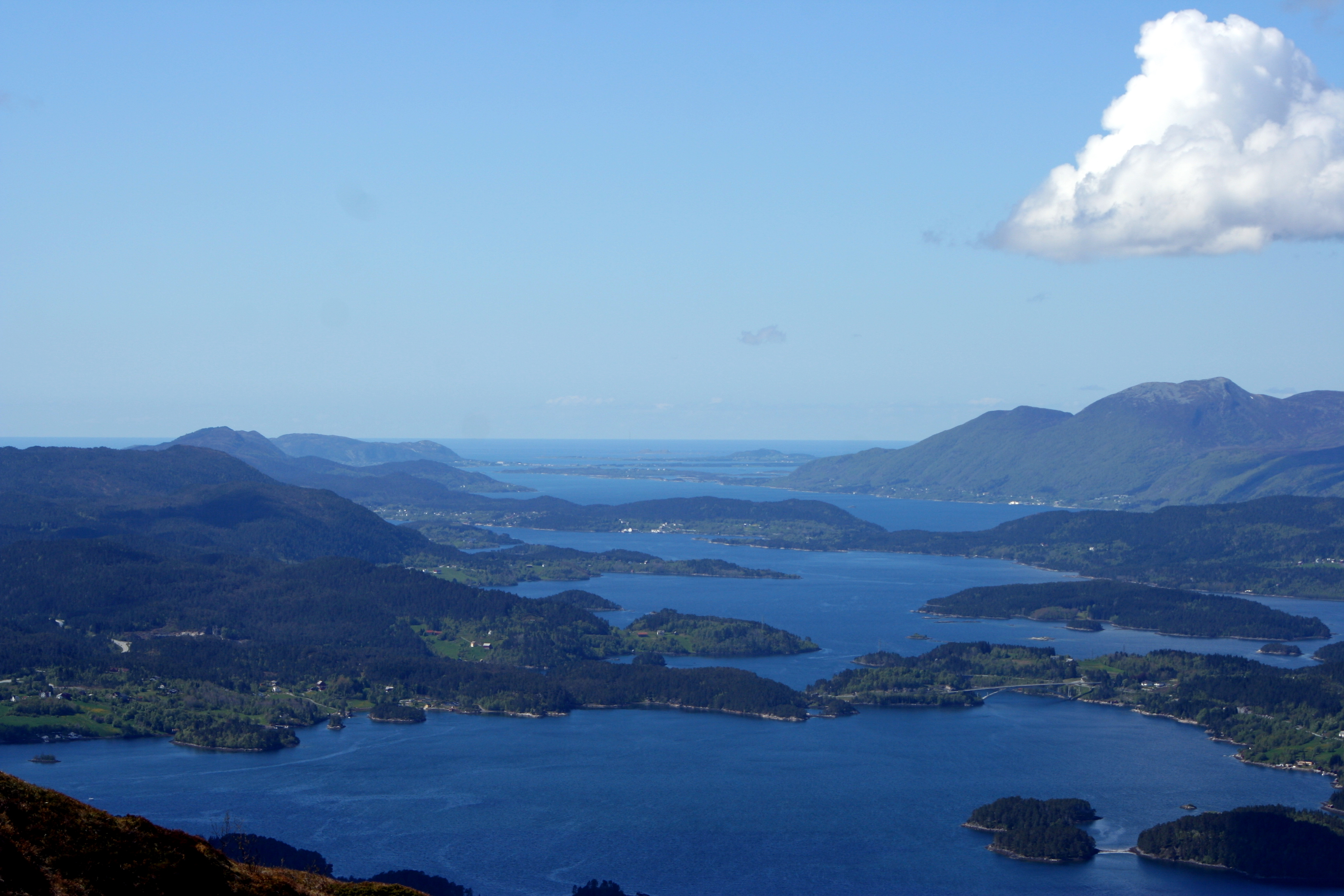
- View of Ellingsøya
- Interactive map of Ellingsøya

Geography
- Location: Møre og Romsdal, Norway
- Coordinates: 62.4936°N 6.1772°E
- Area: 28 km^{2} (11 sq mi)
- Length: 16 km (9.9 mi)
- Width: 2.8 km (1.74 mi)
- Highest elevation: 329 m (1079 ft)
- Highest point: Myklebusthornet

Administration
- Norway
- County: Møre og Romsdal
- Municipality: Ålesund Municipality

Demographics
- Population: 2546 (2015)

Ellingsøya is an island in Ålesund Municipality in Møre og Romsdal county, Norway. With an area of 22 square kilometres (8.5 sq mi), Ellingsøya is the second largest island in the municipality after Uksenøya. The island is located northeast of the town of Ålesund, north of the islands of Nørve and Uksenøya, east of the island of Valderøya, and south of the mainland peninsula of Haram Municipality. The villages of Hoffland, Årset, and Myklebust are all located on the south side of the island. Ellingsøy Church is the main church for the island.

Ellingsøya has an association football team, Ellingsøy IL, which currently plays in the 5th division in Norway.

== Transportation ==
Ellingsøya used to be accessible from the town of Ålesund only by boat or by road via Skodje Municipality, but the undersea Ellingsøy Tunnel was built in 1987 connecting Ellingsøya to Ålesund (to the south) and the Valderøy Tunnel was also built connecting Ellingsøya to the nearby island of Valderøya in Giske Municipality to the west. The tunnels are accessed in the village of Hoffland on the southwestern part of the island. The 3,481-metre (11,421 ft) long tunnel was upgraded in 2007.

== See also ==
- List of islands of Norway
