= Valderøya =

Island in Møre og Romsdal, Norway

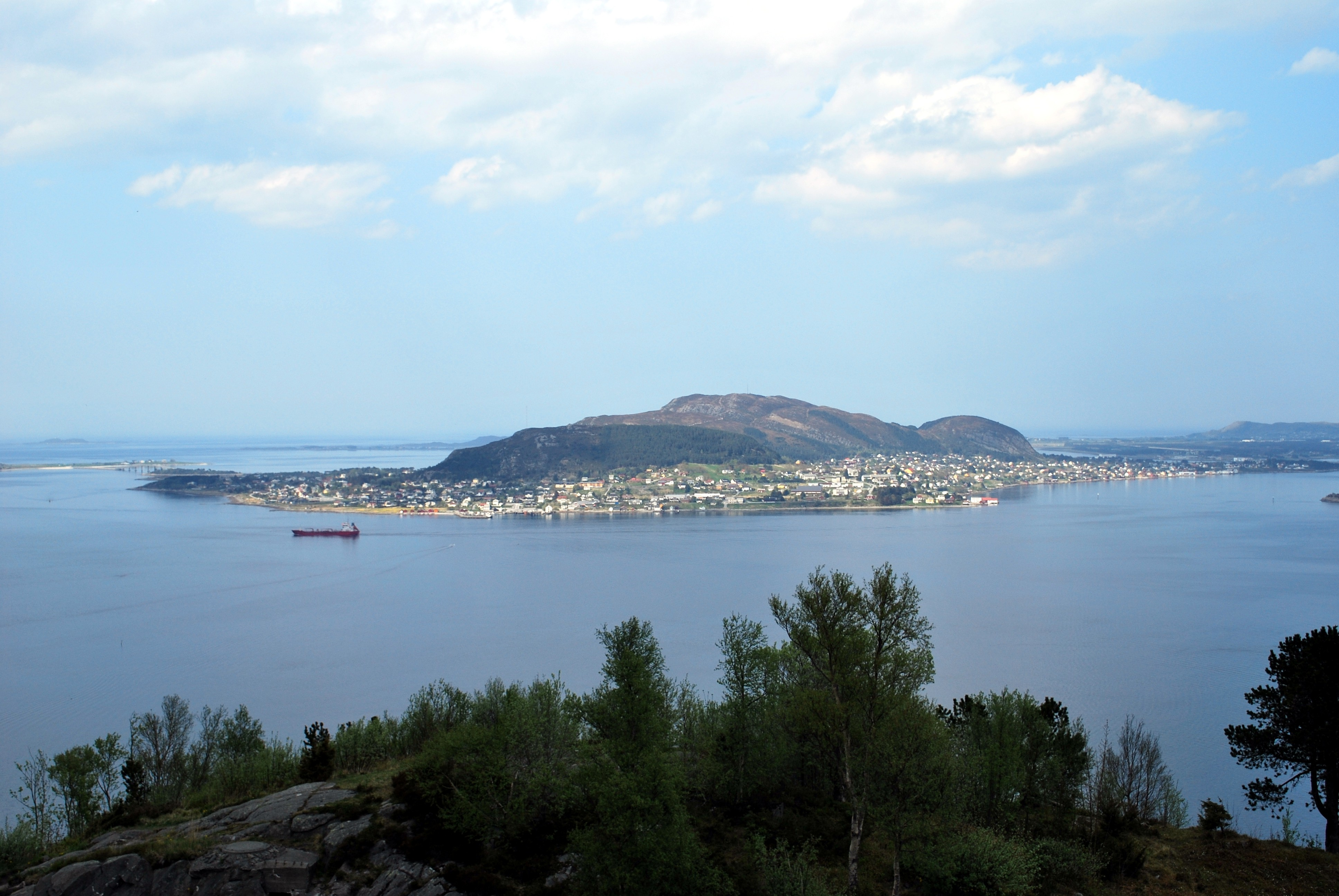
- View of Valderøy island
- Interactive map of Valderøya

Geography
- Location: Møre og Romsdal, Norway
- Coordinates: 62.4974°N 6.1189°E
- Area: 6.5 km^{2} (2.5 sq mi)
- Length: 4 km (2.5 mi)
- Width: 2 km (1.2 mi)
- Highest elevation: 231 m (758 ft)
- Highest point: Signalen

Administration
- Norway
- County: Møre og Romsdal
- Municipality: Giske Municipality

Demographics
- Population: 4153 (2017)
- Pop. density: 639/km^{2} (1655/sq mi)

Valderøya is an island off the west coast of Norway. It is part of Giske Municipality in Møre og Romsdal county. The 6.5-square-kilometre (2.5 sq mi) island had 4,153 residents in 2017.

The island is connected to the city of Ålesund to the south via the Valderøy Tunnel to the island of Ellingsøya and then by the Ellingsøy Tunnel to the city of Ålesund. Valderøya is also connected to the island Vigra to the north by a short bridge. It is also connected to the island of Giske to the west by the Giske Bridge.

The municipal administration, a dentist, and a healthcare service centre for children are found in the municipal hall at Valderhaugstrand, a village on the south side of the island. Nordstrand and Oksnes are two other small villages on the north-east side of the island. On the south-west side are Skjong and Ytterland. There is also one primary school, one lower secondary school, and Valderøy Church on Valderhaugstrand. The island is home to the fish processing industry and is home to many people who work in Ålesund. The local sports team is IL Valder. The newspaper Øy-Blikk has been published on Valderøya since 1985.

== See also ==
- List of islands of Norway
