= Ellingsøy Tunnel =

Subsea road tunnel in Ålesund, Norway

Ellingsøy Tunnel Ellingsøytunnelen
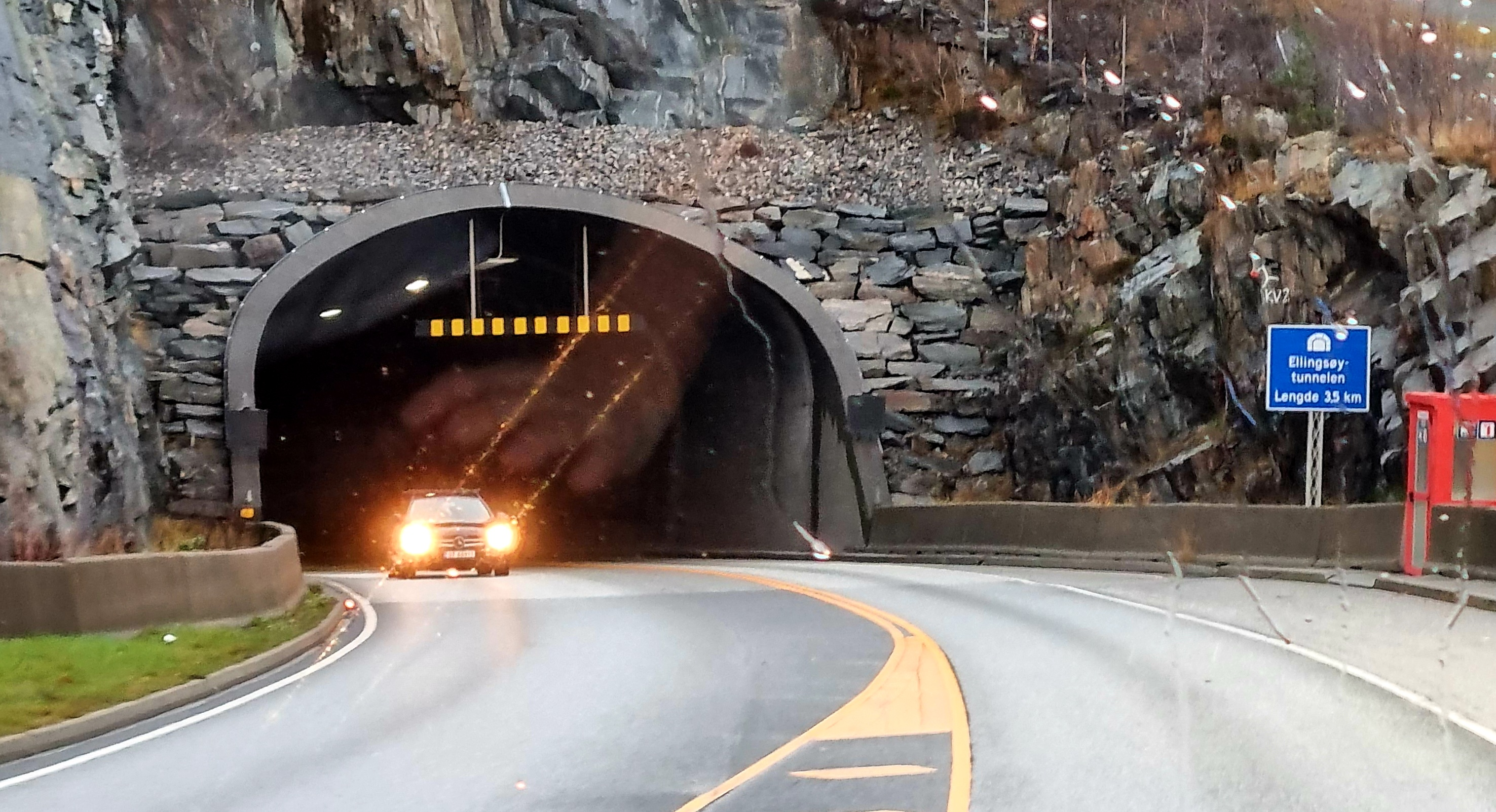
- Interactive map of Ellingsøy Tunnel; Ellingsøytunnelen

Overview
- Location: Ålesund Municipality, Norway
- Coordinates: 62°29′11″N 006°10′57″E
- Route: Rv658

Operation
- Opened: 1987
- Operator: Statens vegvesen
- Toll: Until 25 October 2009

Technical
- Length: 3,481 m (11,421 ft)
- No. of lanes: 3
- Min elevation: 144 metres (472 ft)
- Tunnel clearance: 4.6 metres (15 ft)
- Grade: 8.5%

The Ellingsøy Tunnel (Norwegian: Ellingsøytunnelen) is a subsea road tunnel in Ålesund Municipality in Møre og Romsdal county, Norway. The tunnel runs between the center of the city of Ålesund on the island of Nørve and the village of Hoffland on the island of Ellingsøya. The 3,481-metre (11,421 ft) long tunnel runs under the Ellingsøyfjorden. It is part of National Road 658 and was constructed as part of the Vigra Fixed Link project, which connected several outlying islands to the city of Ålesund and the mainland of Norway.

The tunnel opened in 1987 and it was a toll road until 25 October 2009. The three-lane tunnel has a vertical clearance of 4.6 metres (15 ft) and it reaches a depth of 140 metres (460 ft) below sea level. The steepest parts of the tunnel do not exceed an 8.5% grade. The tunnel has a corkscrew spiral under the Hoffland island to span vertical height.
