= Valderøy Tunnel =

Subsea road tunnel in Møre og Romsdal, Norway

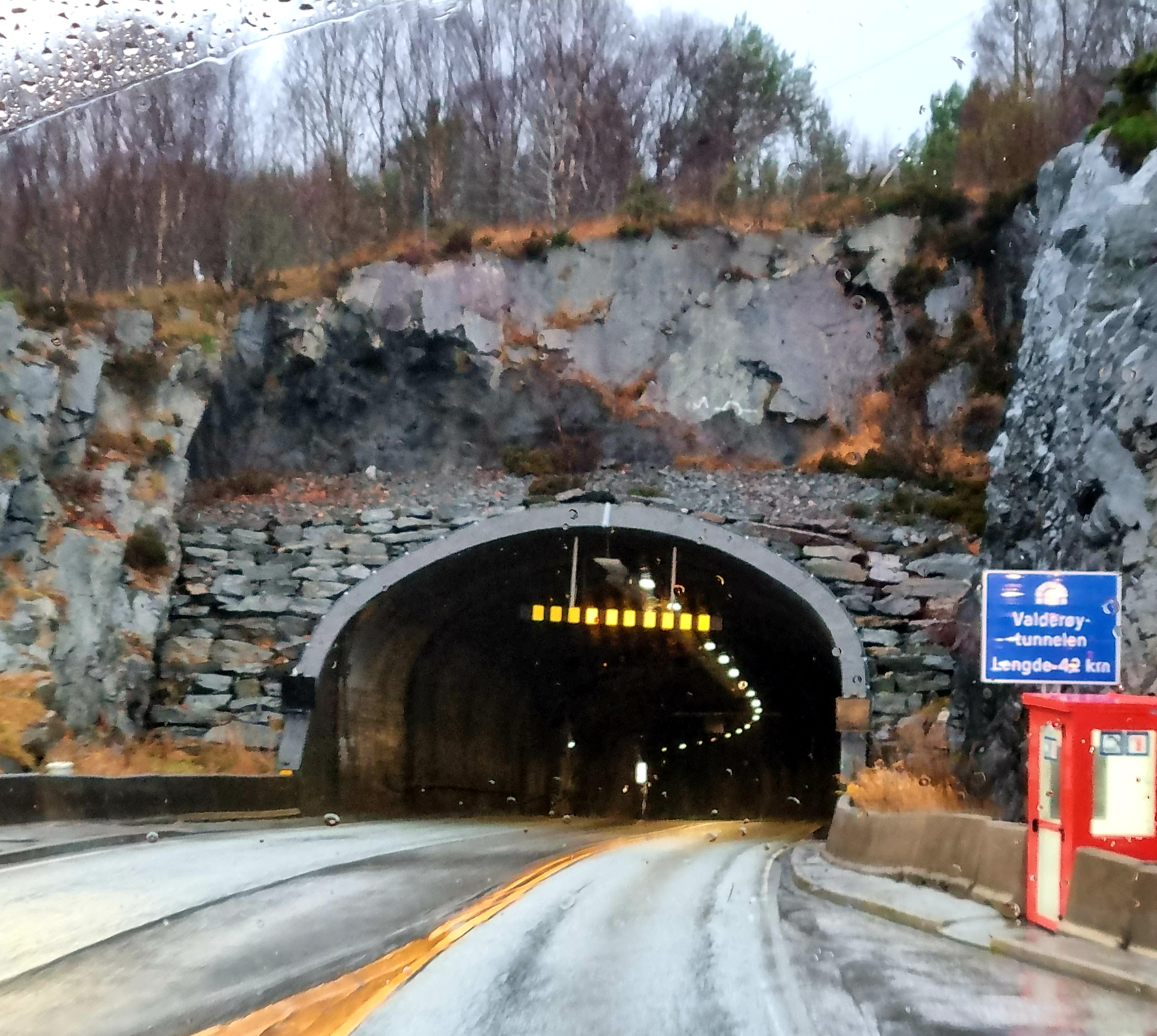
- Interactive map of Valderøy Tunnel

Overview
- Location: Ålesund and Giske, Norway
- Coordinates: 62°29′11″N 006°10′57″E
- Route: Rv658

Operation
- Opened: 1987
- Operator: Statens Vegvesen
- Toll: Until 25 October 2009
- Vehicles per day: 4,700 (in 2007)

Technical
- Length: 4,222 m (13,852 ft)
- No. of lanes: 3
- Min elevation: −137 metres (−449 ft)
- Tunnel clearance: 4.6 metres (15 ft)
- Grade: 8%

The Valderøy Tunnel (Norwegian: Valderøytunnelen) is a subsea road tunnel which runs between the islands of Ellingsøya (in Ålesund Municipality) and Valderøya (in Giske Municipality) in Møre og Romsdal county, Norway. The 4,222-metre (13,852 ft) long tunnel is part of Norwegian National Road 658. The 3-lane wide tunnel has a maximum height of 4.6 metres (15 ft). The tunnel reaches a maximum depth of 137 metres (449 ft) below sea level. It was built in 1987 as part of the Vigra Fixed Link project. It was a toll road until 25 October 2009.
