= Vigra (disambiguation) =

Vigra may refer to:

== Places ==
- Vigra Municipality, a former municipality in Møre og Romsdal county, Norway
- Vigra (island), an island in Giske Municipality in Møre og Romsdal county, Norway
- Ålesund Airport, Vigra in Giske Municipality, Norway
- Vigra transmitter, a transmitter facility for medium wave broadcasting in Giske, Norway
- Vigra Church, a parish church in Giske Municipality in Møre og Romsdal county, Norway
- Vigra Fixed Link, a tunnel network that connects the islands of Giske, Norway to the mainland of Norway.

== Other ==
- VIGRA, the abbreviation for "Vision with Generic Algorithms"
- HNoMS Vigra, a Royal Norwegian Navy submarine chaser that saw action during World War II
