= Synesvågen Nature Reserve =

Protected area in Norway

- Synesvågen naturreservat
- IUCN category Ia (strict nature reserve)
- Interactive map of Synesvågen Nature Reserve
- Nearest city: Roald
- Coordinates: 62°32′40″N 6°1′33″E
- Area: 99.9 ha (247 acres)
- Established: 1988

Ramsar Wetland
- Designated: 18 March 1996
- Part of: Giske Wetlands System
- Reference no.: 805

The Synesvågen Nature Reserve (Norwegian: Synesvågen naturreservat) is located on the southwest part of Vigra island in Giske Municipality in Møre og Romsdal county, Norway.

The area received protection in 1988 "to preserve an important wetland area with its appertaining plant communities, bird life, and other wildlife," according to the conservation regulations. The area is a shallow bay with a seashore rich in species and large tidal banks and sandy areas. The north and east sides have a beach meadow with small ponds and transition into a flat marshland. It is considered one of the most conservation-worthy seasides in the county. The bay serves as a resting and overwintering site for birds, and there are many nesting species of regional importance; altogether, 17 species have one of their most important regional concentrations here, and one species has one of its most important national concentrations here. The area is well suited for study and teaching, and for directly observing bird migrations.

The nature reserve is one of six natural areas that were included in the Giske Wetlands System Ramsar site, which was established in 1996.
