= Blindheimsvik Wildlife Sanctuary =

Protected wetland with diverse bird species

- Blindheimsvik dyrefredningsområde
- IUCN category IV (habitat/species management area)
- Interactive map of Blindheimsvik Wildlife Sanctuary
- Nearest city: Roald
- Coordinates: 62°33′02″N 6°05′29″E
- Area: 1,114 ha (4.30 sq mi)
- Established: 1988

Ramsar Wetland
- Designated: 18 March 1996
- Part of: Giske Wetlands System
- Reference no.: 805

The Blindheimsvik Wildlife Sanctuary (Norwegian: Blindheimsvik dyrefredningsområde) is located on the south side of Vigra island in Giske Municipality in Møre og Romsdal county, Norway.

The area received protection in 1988 "to preserve an important wetland area with its habitat, bird life and other wildlife", according to the conservation regulations. The area consists of a long shallow bay with large tidal areas. Many small streams empty into the bay, where there are beach meadow areas rich in various species. The bay is important as a resting place for ducks and waders, and as an overwintering site and nesting site for wetland birds. Twenty bird species of international importance and three species of national importance have been observed here.

The wildlife sanctuary is one of six natural areas that were included in the Giske Wetlands System Ramsar site, which was established in 1996.
