= Giske Wetlands System =

Protected wetlands in Norway

- Giske våtmarkssystem
- Location within Møre og Romsdal Location within Norway
- Nearest city: Roald
- Coordinates: 62°33′45″N 6°6′7″E
- Area: 550 ha (1,400 acres)
- Established: 1996

Ramsar Wetland
- Designated: 18 March 1996
- Reference no.: 805

The Giske Wetlands System (Norwegian: Giske våtmarkssystem) is a Ramsar site located in Giske Municipality in Møre og Romsdal county, Norway. It consists of six separate protected areas: two nature reserves and four wildlife sanctuaries. One of the nature reserves lies on the island of Giske and the five other areas are located on the island of Vigra in the same municipality.

The areas have been protected as a Ramsar site since 1996 because of their importance for migratory birds. There are large shallow areas with mudflats exposed during low tide. A lot of seaweed (Fucales and kelp) accumulates there, providing good conditions for birds in search of food. There are also marshes, damp beach meadows, and swamps in the wetland system.

The six areas are:

- The Roaldsand Wildlife Sanctuary, established on May 27, 1988 (84.4 hectares or 209 acres)
- The Rørvikvågen Wildlife Sanctuary, established on May 27, 1988 (70.4 hectares or 174 acres)
- The Rørvikvatnet Nature Reserve, established on May 27, 1988 (38.9 hectares or 96 acres)
- The Giske Wildlife Sanctuary, established on May 27, 1988 (145.7 hectares or 360 acres)
- The Blindheimsvik Wildlife Sanctuary, established on May 27, 1988 (113.9 hectares or 281 acres)
- The Synesvågen Nature Reserve, established on May 27, 1988 (99.9 hectares or 247 acres)
