= Roaldsand Wildlife Sanctuary =

Protected area in Norway

- Roaldsand dyrefredningsområde
- IUCN category IV (habitat/species management area)
- Interactive map of Roaldsand Wildlife Sanctuary
- Nearest city: Roald
- Coordinates: 62°34′05″N 6°07′33″E
- Area: 84.4 ha (209 acres)
- Established: 1988

Ramsar Wetland
- Designated: 18 March 1996
- Part of: Giske Wetlands System
- Reference no.: 805

The Roaldsand Wildlife Sanctuary (Norwegian: Roaldsand dyrefredningsområde) is located on the east side of Vigra island in Giske Municipality in Møre og Romsdal county, Norway.

The area received protection in 1988 "to preserve an important wetland area with its habitat, bird life and other wildlife", according to the conservation regulations. The area consists of several long shallow sandy beaches, some with wind-blown sand. The beaches are open to northeast with no protection from islets or skerries. Ninety-five species of plants have been identified in the area, many of which are rare. The area is a resting and overwintering place for migratory birds. Twelve of the bird species observed here are of regional importance, and six are of national importance. The protected area is split into two party by Ålesund Airport. It is a popular leisure and recreation area, and it is often used for educational purposes.

The wildlife sanctuary is one of six natural areas that were included in the Giske Wetlands System Ramsar site, which was established in 1996.
