= Rørvikvågen Wildlife Sanctuary =

Protected area in Norway

- Rørvikvågen dyrefredningsområde
- IUCN category IV (habitat/species management area)
- Interactive map of Rørvikvågen Wildlife Sanctuary
- Nearest city: Roald
- Coordinates: 62°34′26″N 6°5′52″E
- Area: 70.4 ha (174 acres)
- Established: 1988

Ramsar Wetland
- Designated: 18 March 1996
- Part of: Giske Wetlands System
- Reference no.: 805

The Rørvikvågen Wildlife Sanctuary (Norwegian: Rørvikvågen dyrefredningsområde) is located on the west side of Vigra island in Giske Municipality in Møre og Romsdal county, Norway.

The area received protection in 1988 "to preserve an important wetland area with its habitat, bird life and other wildlife", according to the conservation regulations. The bay is a large shallow inlet with large tidal areas. Many streams empty into the bay, and together with drifting accumulations of seaweed and kelp this creates a basis for plentiful food for wildlife. The inner part of the bay is shielded by a belt of pebbles, where there are ponds and lagoons. The bay is a resting, nesting, and overwintering site for wetland birds. Twenty-one species of birds of regional importance have been observed here, 13 of national importance, and five of international importance. Ornithological studies and teaching take place in the area. The area is partially threatened by pressure from livestock on farms.

The wildlife sanctuary is one of six natural areas that were included in the Giske Wetlands System Ramsar site, which was established in 1996.
