= Giske =

Giske may refer to:

== Places ==
- Giske Municipality, a municipality in Møre og Romsdal county, Norway
- Giske (island), an island within Giske Municipality in Møre og Romsdal county, Norway
- Giske (village), a village within Giske Municipality in Møre og Romsdal county, Norway
- Giske Church, a church in Giske Municipality in Møre og Romsdal county, Norway
- Giske Wetlands System, a Ramsar site located in Giske Municipality in Møre og Romsdal county, Norway
- Giske Wildlife Sanctuary, a wildlife sanctuary in Giske Municipality in Møre og Romsdal county, Norway

== People ==
- Anders Giske (born 1959), a retired Norwegian football player
- Anneli Giske (born 1985), a Norwegian international footballer
- Bendik Giske, a Norwegian saxophonist and performance artist
- Jorunn Bjørg Giske (1927–2021), a Norwegian politician for the Labour Party
- Kenneth Giske (born 1976), a retired Norwegian football midfielder
- Madeleine Giske (born 1987), a Norwegian football midfielder
- Trond Giske (born 1966), a Norwegian politician
