= Rørvikvatnet Nature Reserve =

Protected area in Norway

- Rørvikvatnet naturreservat
- IUCN category Ia (strict nature reserve)
- Interactive map of Rørvikvatnet Nature Reserve
- Nearest city: Roald
- Coordinates: 62°33′0″N 6°6′58″E
- Area: 38.9 ha (96 acres)
- Established: 1988

Ramsar Wetland
- Designated: 18 March 1996
- Part of: Giske Wetlands System
- Reference no.: 805

The Rørvikvatnet Nature Reserve (Norwegian: Rørvikvatnet naturreservat) is located on the southeast part of Vigra island in Giske Municipality in Møre og Romsdal county, Norway.

The area received protection in 1988 "to preserve an important wetland area with its appertaining plant communities, bird life, and other wildlife", according to the conservation regulations. The reserve consists of a small shallow pond surrounded by marsh and cultivated land. It is a nesting area for wetland birds and is also an area that birds pass through during migration. Two bird species that nest here are of international importance, six species are of national importance, and 11 species (of which eight nest here) are of regional importance. The landscape is partially covered by rich vegetation where there is shell sand, and there is a wind-blown sand area that is relatively unique to the region. The nature reserve lies a little bit south of Ålesund Airport. Traffic is not permitted in the area from April to August.

The nature reserve is one of six natural areas that were included in the Giske Wetlands System Ramsar site, which was established in 1996.
