= Rahuste Nature Reserve =

Protected area in Estonia

- Location within Estonia
- Location: Estonia
- Nearest city: Kuressaare
- Coordinates: 58°05′37″N 22°07′01″E
- Area: 689 ha (1,700 acres)

Rahuste Nature Reserve is a nature reserve situated on Saaremaa island in western Estonia, in Saare County.

The nature reserve has been established to protect the bird-life of the area, and is centred on Ooslamaa and Kriimi islets. Birds that can be seen in the area include avocet, dunlin and arctic tern, among others. The reserve also hosts one of the most well-preserved coastal meadows of Estonia.
