= Coastal meadow =

Meadows near coastlines or otherwise in the coastal zone

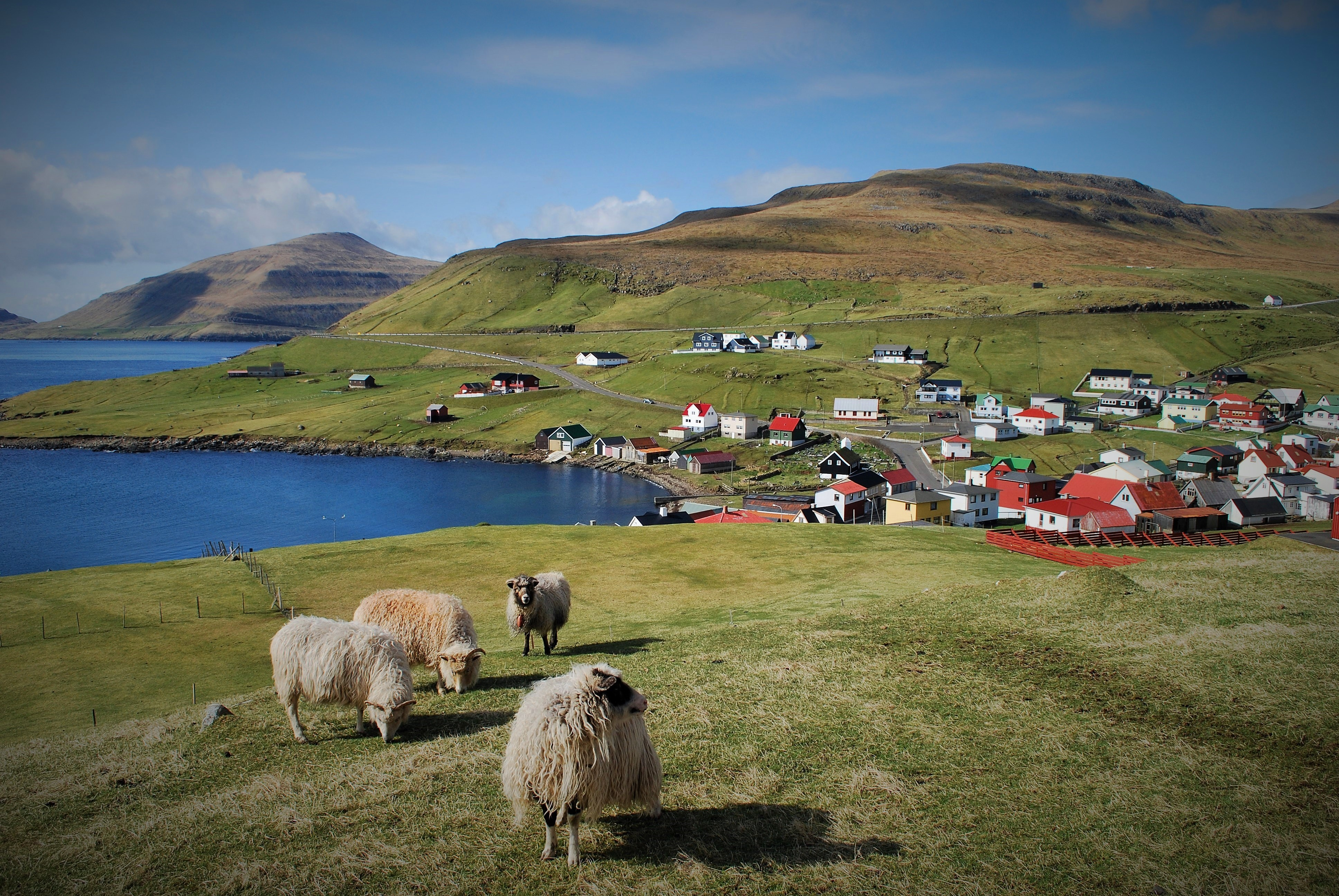
Coastal meadows. Suðuroy, Faroe Islands. These coastal meadows are fell meadows.

Coastal meadows are meadows in the coastal zone, influenced by the sea.

Under this definition, the salinity of the air and wind is usually high and the flora is dominated by salt-tolerant species. Some coastal meadows may be flooded by seawater occasionally, increasing the demands on the flora even further. These conditions however, do not make a meadow. To be categorized as a meadow in the first place, the plant growth has to be low in height, and normally this can only be achieved from wear by general traffic or grazing of the landscape (artificially or by livestock). Coastal meadows are therefore usually thought of as cultural landscapes or biotopes, requiring some degree of intervention and not being able to sustain themselves on their own. If left alone, coastal meadows would often transform into a transitional meadow and eventually a shrubby or bushy seashore habitat.

Depending on the geology, climate and local conditions, coastal meadows can take on different expressions, with their own specific ecology. The main subcategories are:

- Beach meadows
- Fell meadows

Coastal meadows can be found all over the world, where grazing is practiced near the coast and in some places they emerge as natural landscapes. Woody plant encroachment is observed in some areas, such as the coastal meadows of Estonia.

== See also ==
- Salt marsh
- Coastal prairie (disambiguation)
