= Meadow =

Open habitat vegetated primarily by non-woody plants

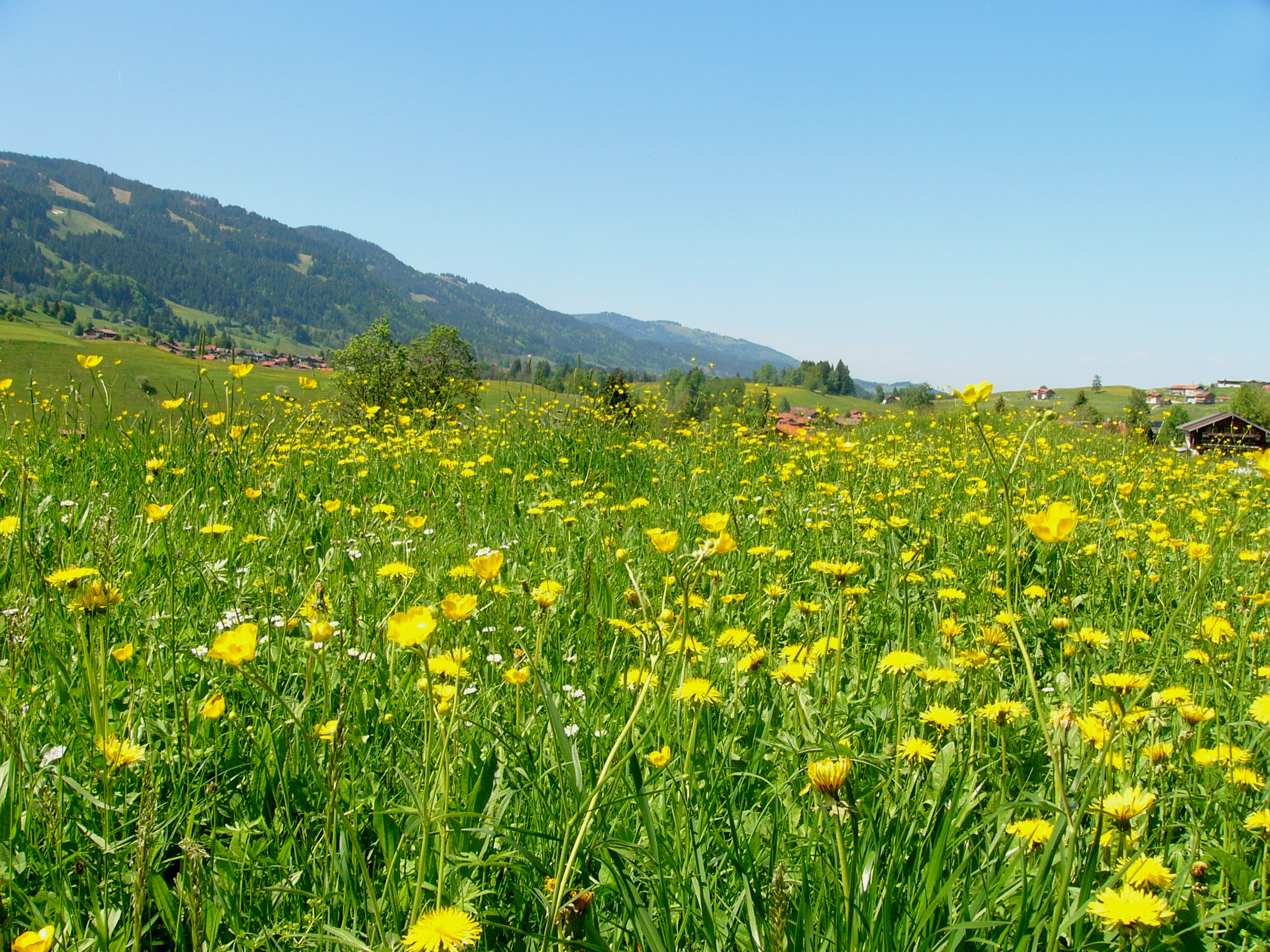
Wildflower meadow in the Bavarian Alps

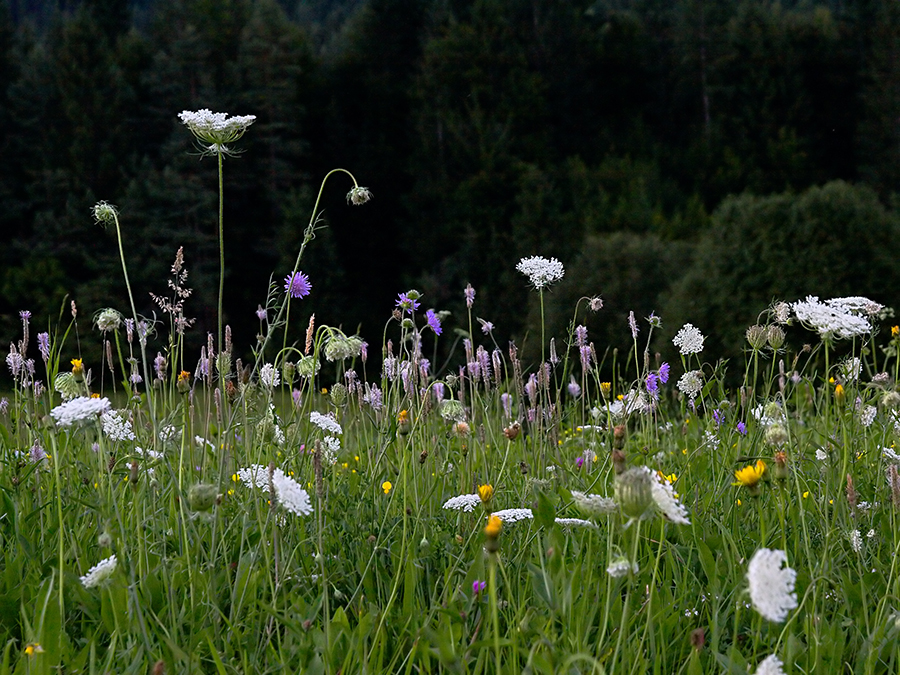
Living meadow, Austria

A meadow (/ˈmɛdoʊ/ MED-oh) is an open habitat or field, vegetated by grasses, herbs, and other non-woody plants. Trees or shrubs may sparsely populate meadows, as long as they maintain an open character. Meadows can occur naturally under favourable conditions but are often artificially created from cleared shrub or woodland for the production of hay, fodder or livestock. Meadow habitats as a group are characterized as semi-natural grasslands, meaning that they are largely composed of species native to the region, with only limited human intervention.

Meadows attract a multitude of wildlife and support flora and fauna that cannot thrive in other habitats. They are ecologically important since they provide areas for animal courtship displays, nesting, food gathering, pollinating insects, and sometimes sheltering if the vegetation is high enough. Intensified agricultural practices (too frequent mowing, use of mineral fertilizers, manure and insecticides) may lead to declines in the abundance of organisms and species diversity. There are many types of meadow, including agricultural, transitional, and perpetual – each being a unique and important part of the ecosystem.

Like other biomes, meadows will experience increased pressure (including on their biodiversity) owing to climate change, especially as precipitation and weather conditions change. However grasslands and meadows also have an important climate change mitigation potential as carbon sinks: deep-rooted grasses store a substantial amount of carbon in soil.

== Types ==
=== Agricultural meadows ===
In agriculture, a meadow is grassland that is not regularly grazed by domestic livestock but rather allowed to grow unchecked in order to produce hay. Their origins extend back to the Iron Age, when appropriate tools for the hay harvest emerged. The ability to produce livestock fodder on meadows had a significant advantage for livestock production, since animals could be kept in enclosures, simplifying the control over breeding. Surpluses in biomass production during the summer could be stored for the winter, preventing damage to forests and grasslands since there was no longer the need for livestock grazing during the winter.

Especially in the United Kingdom and Ireland, the term meadow is commonly used in its original sense to mean a hay meadow, signifying grassland mown annually in the summer for making hay. Agricultural meadows are typically lowland or upland fields upon which hay or pasture grasses grow from self-sown or hand-sown seed. Traditional hay meadows were once common in rural Britain but are now in decline. Ecologist Professor John Rodwell states that over the past century England and Wales have lost about 97% of their hay meadows. Fewer than 15,000 hectares (37,000 acres) of lowland meadows remain in the UK and most sites are relatively small and fragmented. 25% of the UK's meadows are found in Worcestershire, with Foster's Green Meadow managed by the Worcestershire Wildlife Trust being a major site.

A similar concept to the hay meadow is the pasture, which differs from the meadow in that it is grazed through the summer rather than being allowed to grow out and periodically be cut for hay. A pasture can also refer to any land used for grazing, and in this wider sense the term refers not only to grass pasture but also to non-grassland habitats such as heathland, moorland and wood pasture. The term grassland is used to describe both hay meadows and grass pastures.

The specific agricultural practices in relation to the meadow can take on various expressions. As mentioned, this could be hay production or providing food for grazing cattle and livestock but also to give room for orchards or honey production. Meadows are embedded and dependent on a complex web of socio-cultural conditions for their maintenance. Historically, they emerged to increase agricultural efficiency when the necessary tools became available. Today, agricultural practices have shifted and meadows have largely lost their original purpose. Yet, they are appreciated today for their aesthetics and ecological functions. Consequently, the European Union's Common Agricultural Policy subsidizes their management, mostly through grazing.

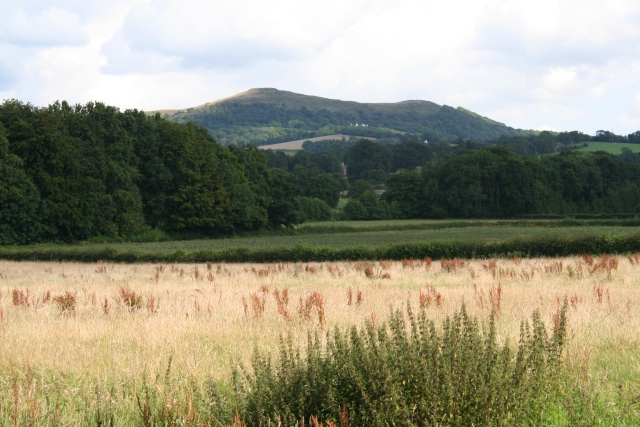
An uncut hay meadow

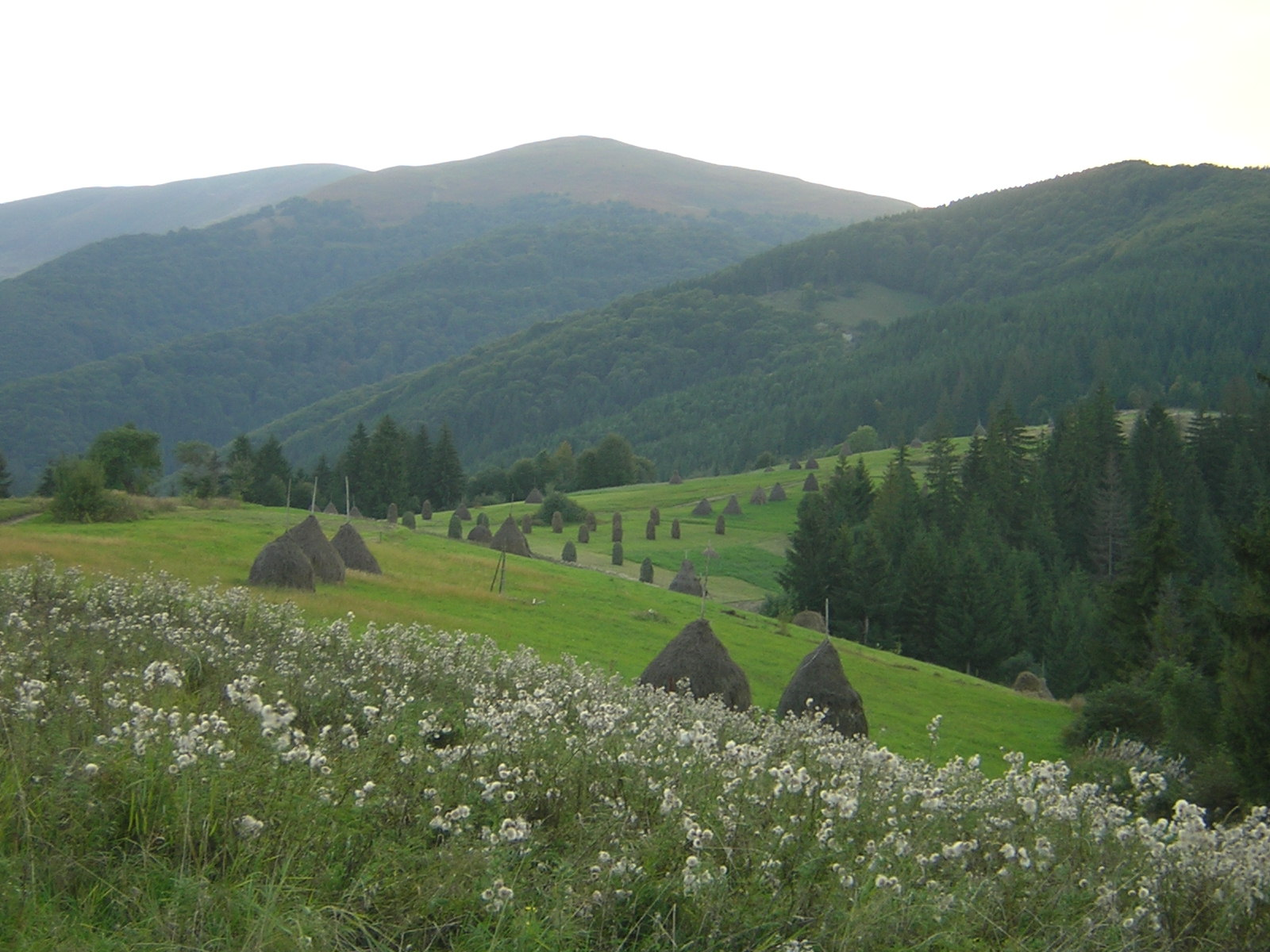
Mountain hay meadows with haystacks

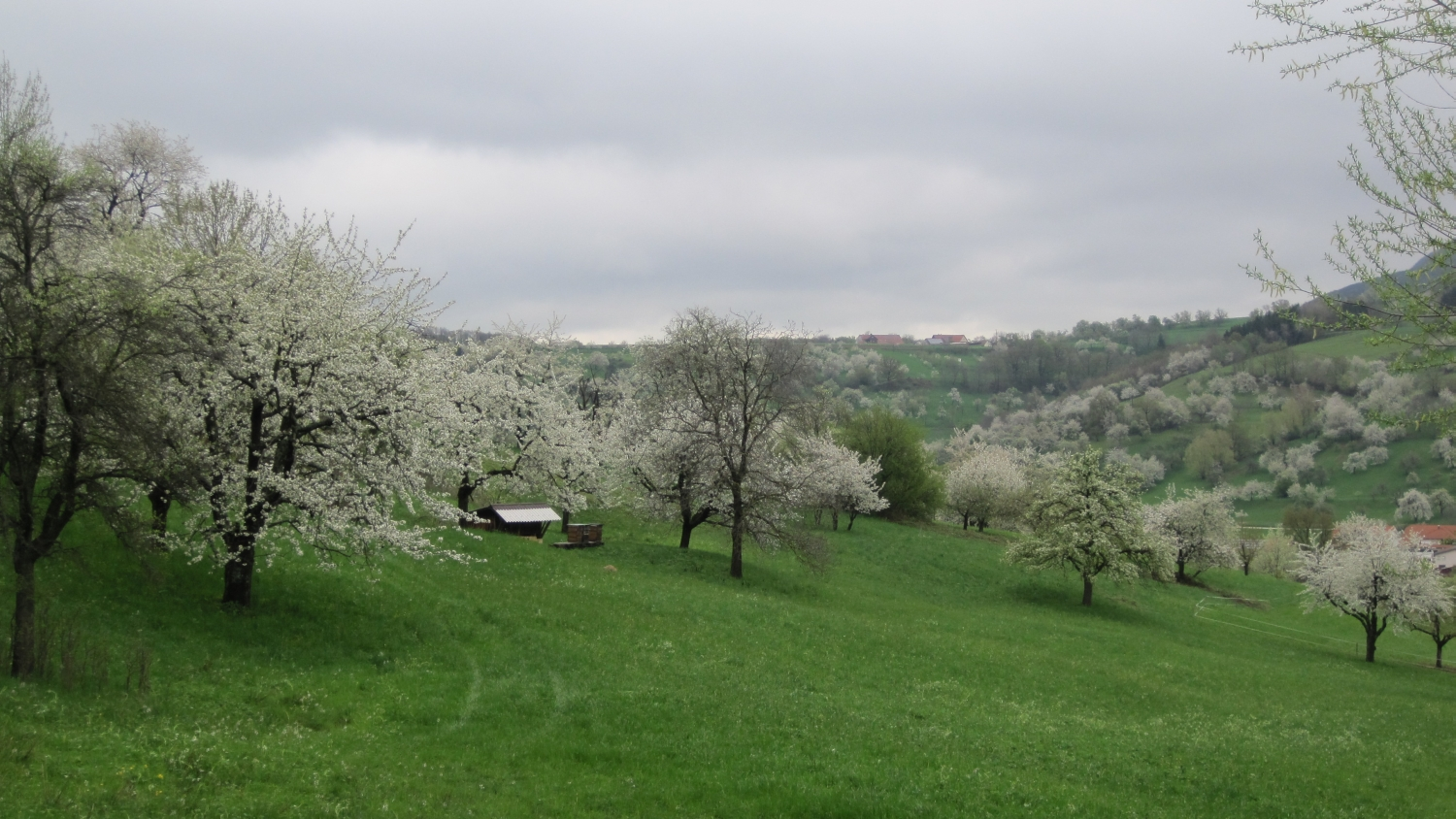
An orchard meadow

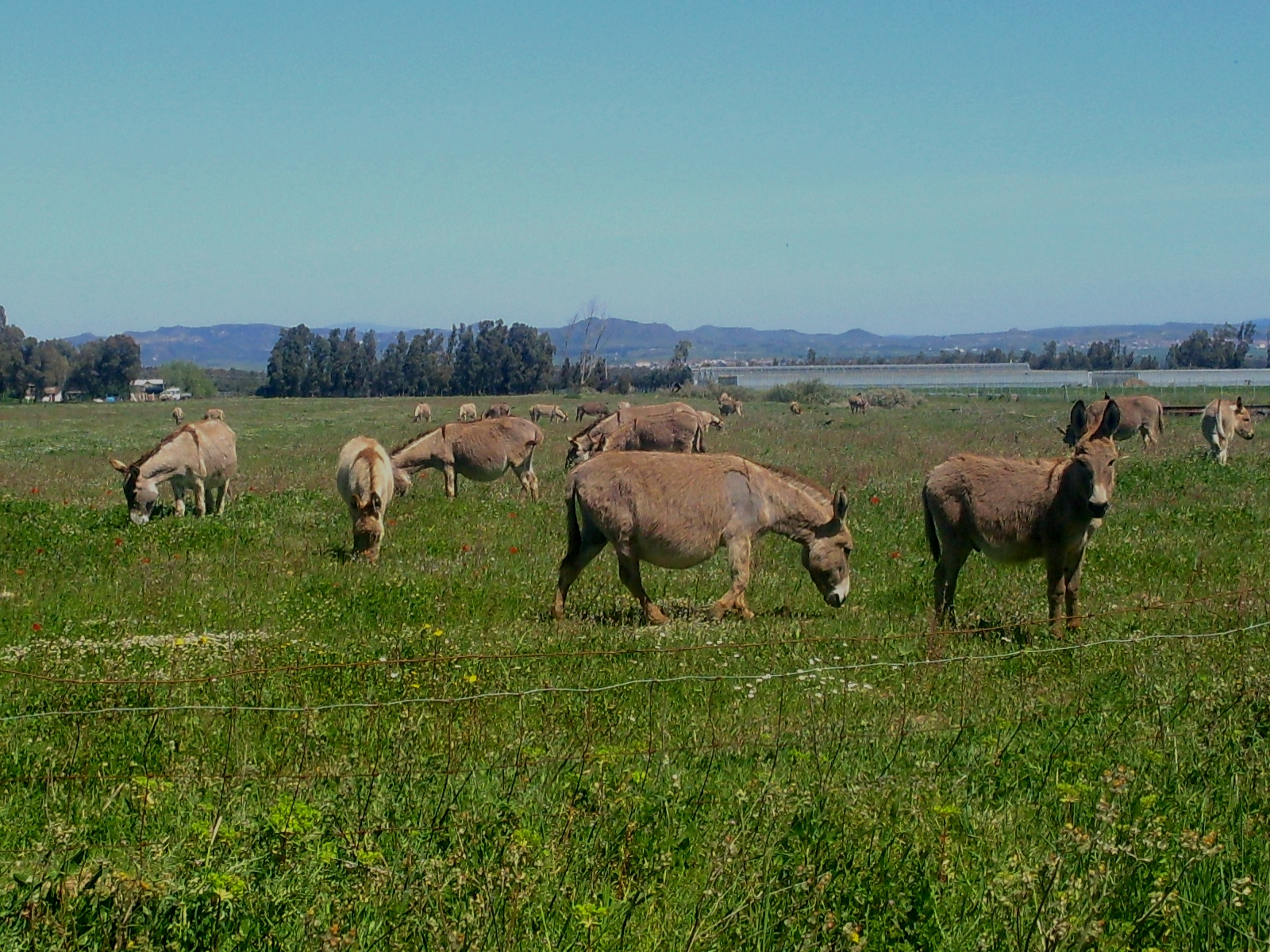
A meadow (pasture) maintained by grazing livestock

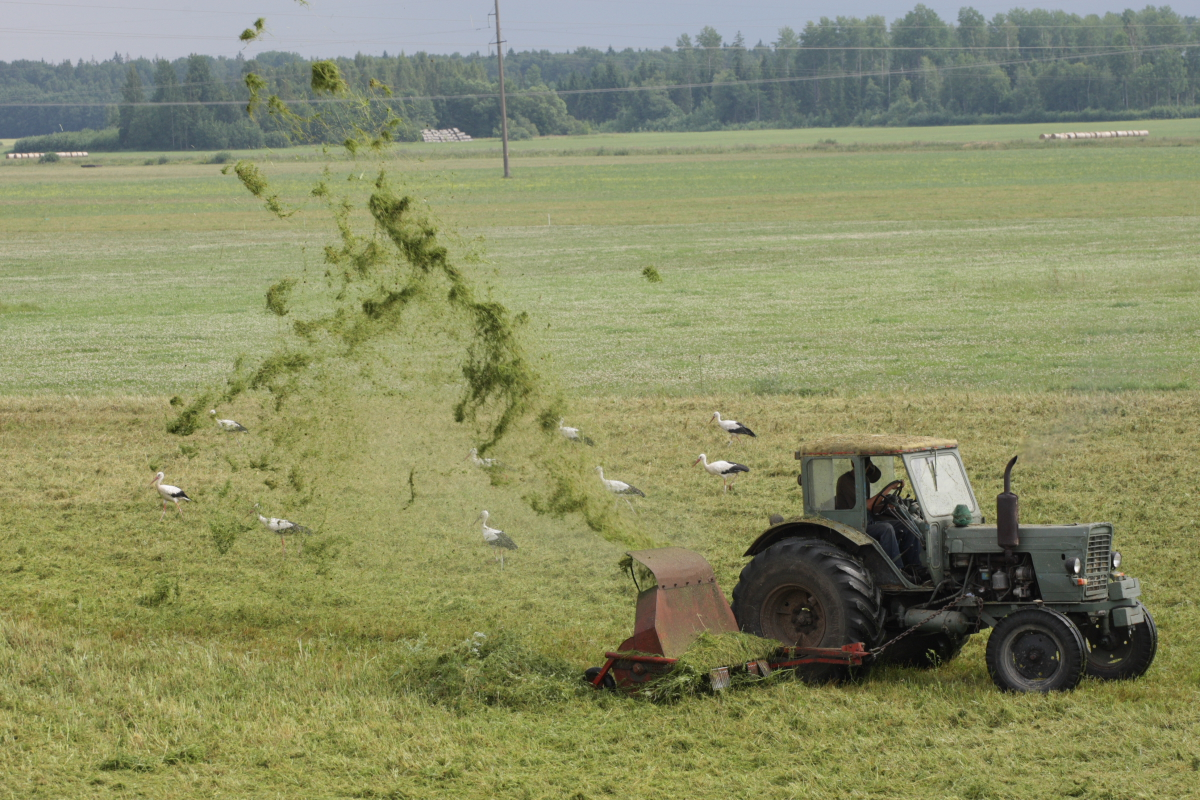
Artificially grazed meadow

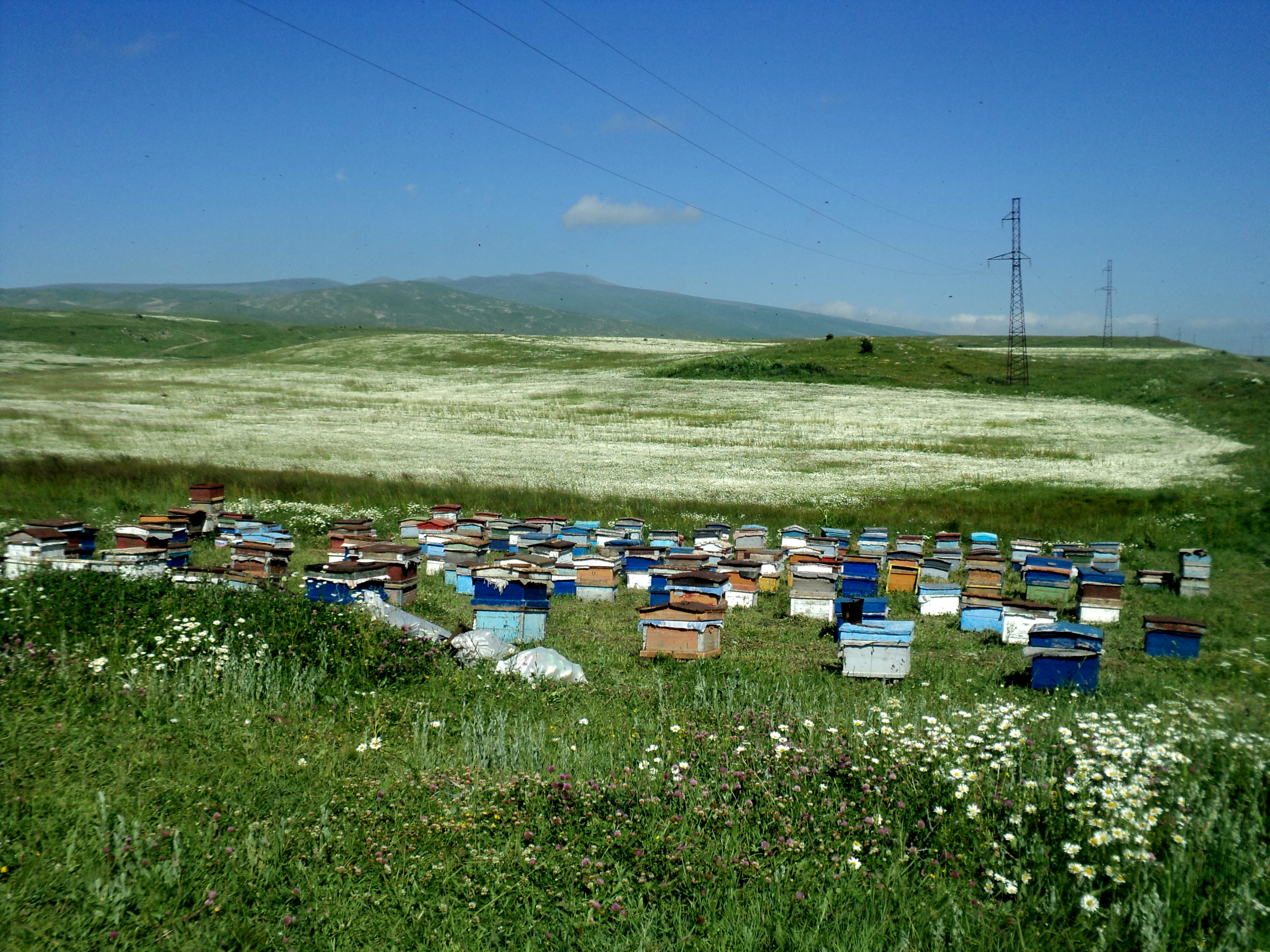
Artificial beehives

=== Transitional meadows ===
A transitional meadow occurs when a field, pasture, farmland, or other cleared land is no longer cut or grazed and starts to display luxuriant growth, extending to the flowering and self-seeding of its grass and wildflower species. The condition is however only temporary, because the grasses eventually become shaded out when scrub and woody plants become well-established, being the forerunners of the return to a fully wooded state. A transitional state can be artificially-maintained through a double-field system, in which cultivated soil and meadows are alternated for a period of 10 to 12 years each.

In North America prior to European colonization, Algonquians, Iroquois and other Native Americans peoples regularly cleared areas of forest to create transitional meadows where deer and game could find food and be hunted. For example, some of today's meadows originated thousands of years ago, due to regular burnings by Native Americans.

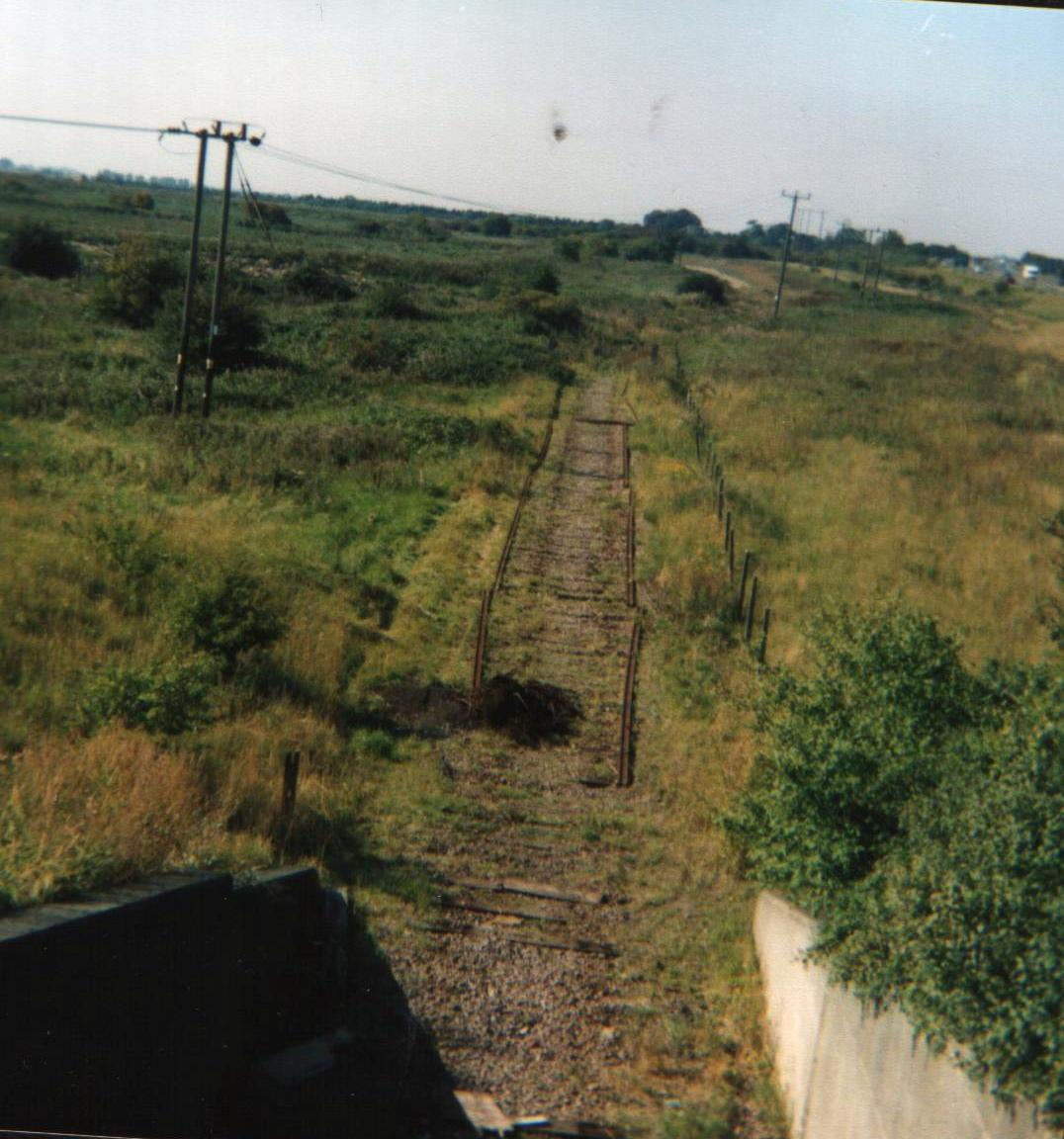
Abandoned meadow in England

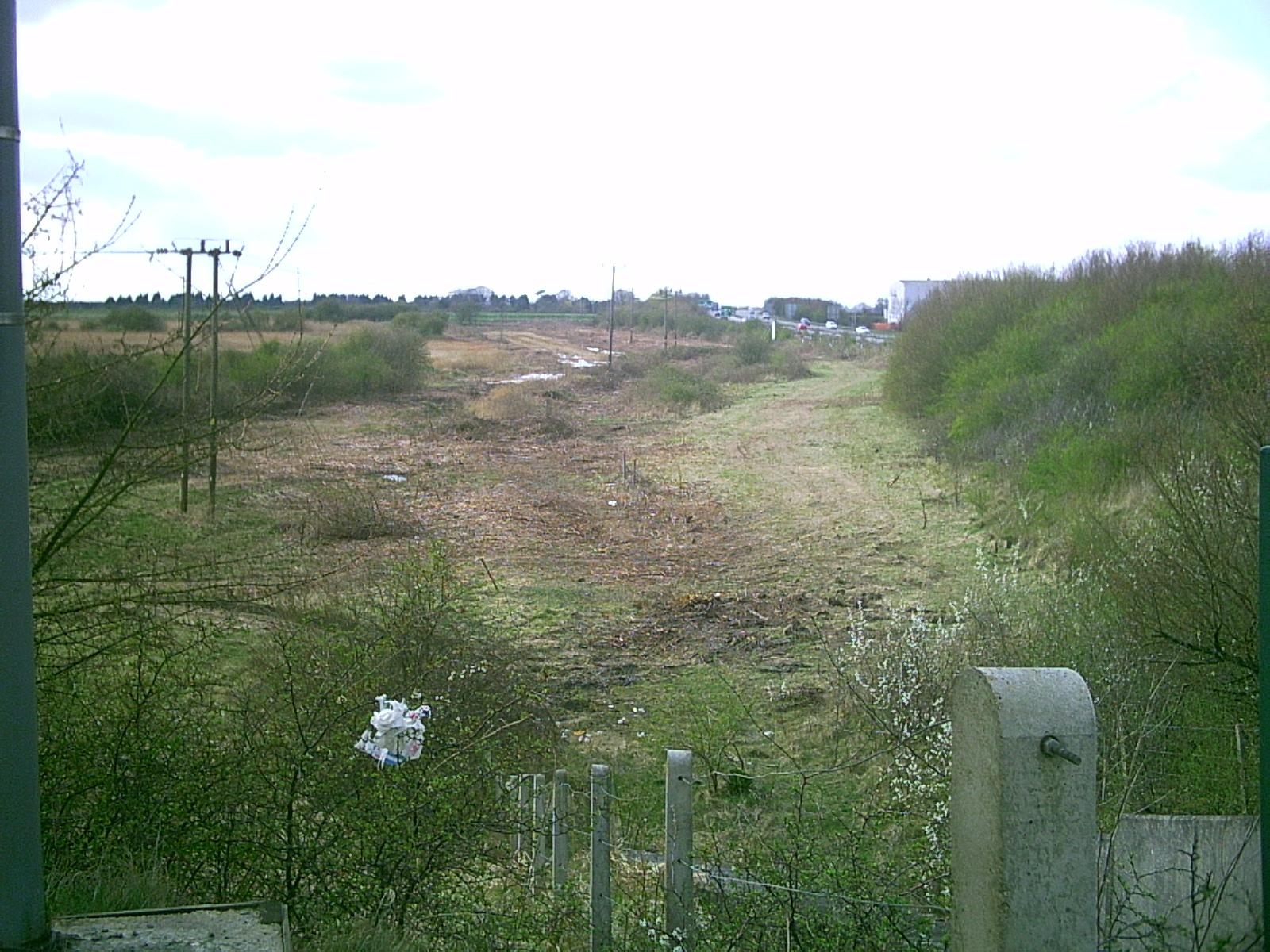
The same landscape some years later

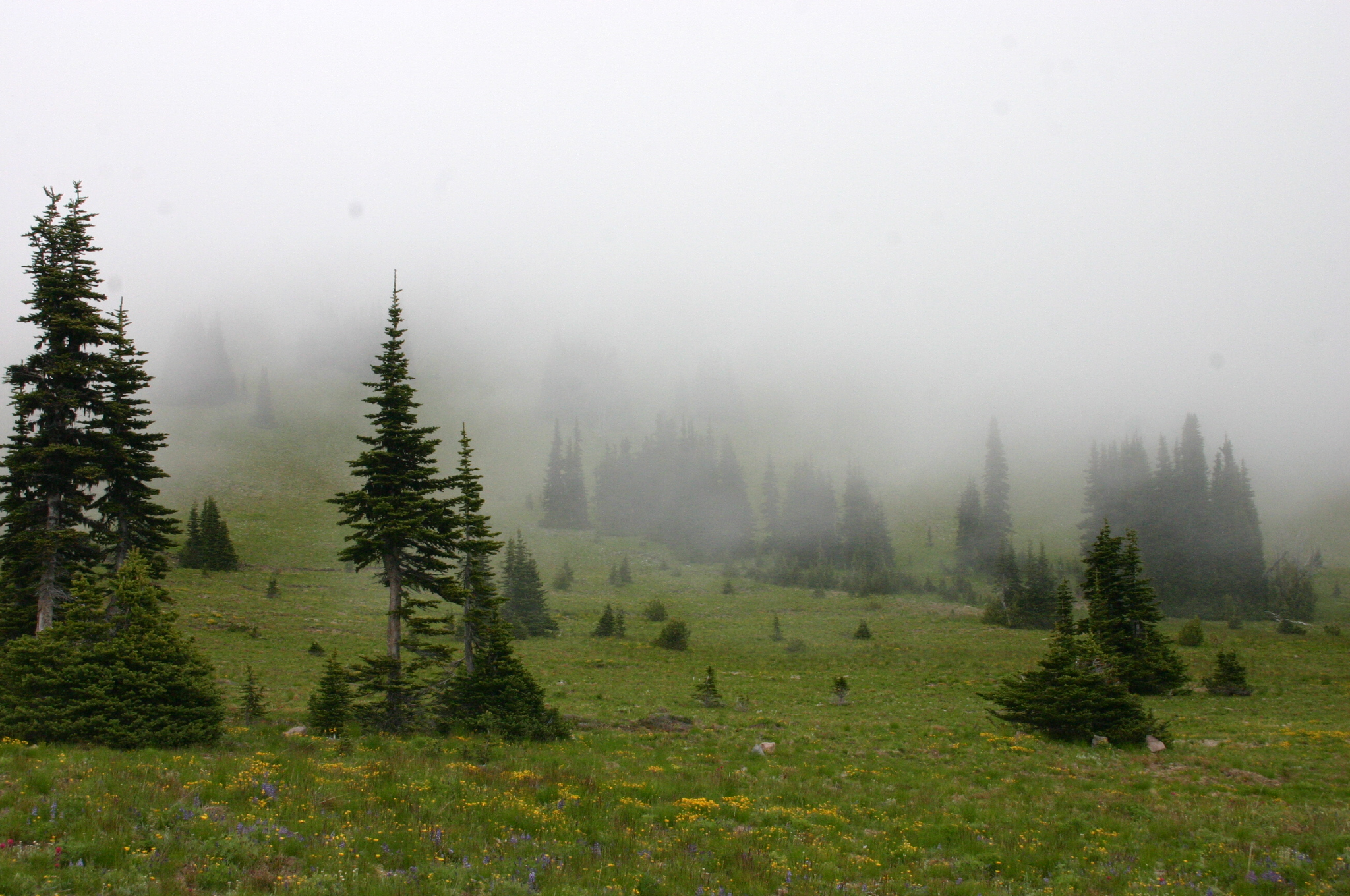
Conifers encroaching on a meadow in Washington, USA

=== Perpetual meadows ===
A perpetual meadow, also called a natural meadow, is one in which environmental factors, such as climatic and soil conditions, are favorable to perennial grasses and restrict the growth of woody plants indefinitely. Types of perpetual meadows may include:

- Alpine meadows occur at high elevations above the tree line and maintained by harsh climatic conditions.
- Coastal meadows maintained by salt sprays.
- Desert meadows restricted by low precipitation or lack of nutrients and humus.
- Prairies maintained by periods of severe drought or subject to wildfires.
- Wet meadows (a semi-wetland area) saturated with water throughout much of the year.
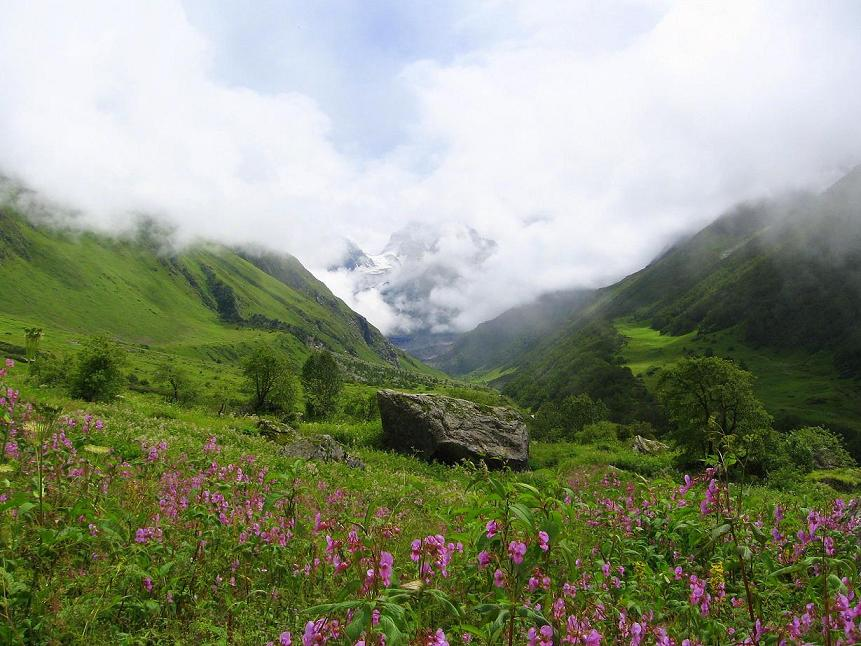
The perpetual alpine meadows in Valley of Flowers, Uttarakhand, India (western Himalayas)

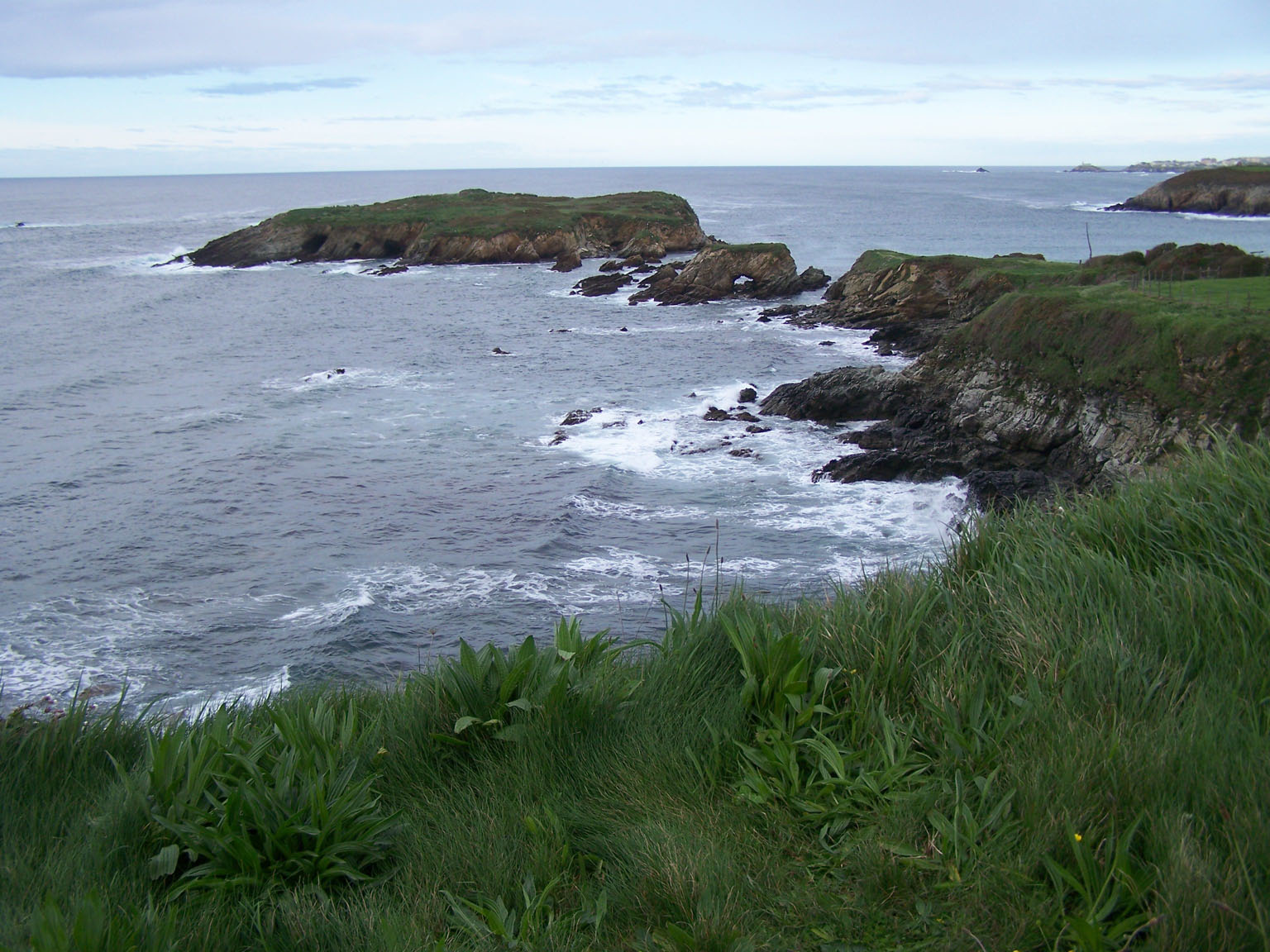
The coastal meadows at the Bay of Biscay near Tapia de Casariego, Spain

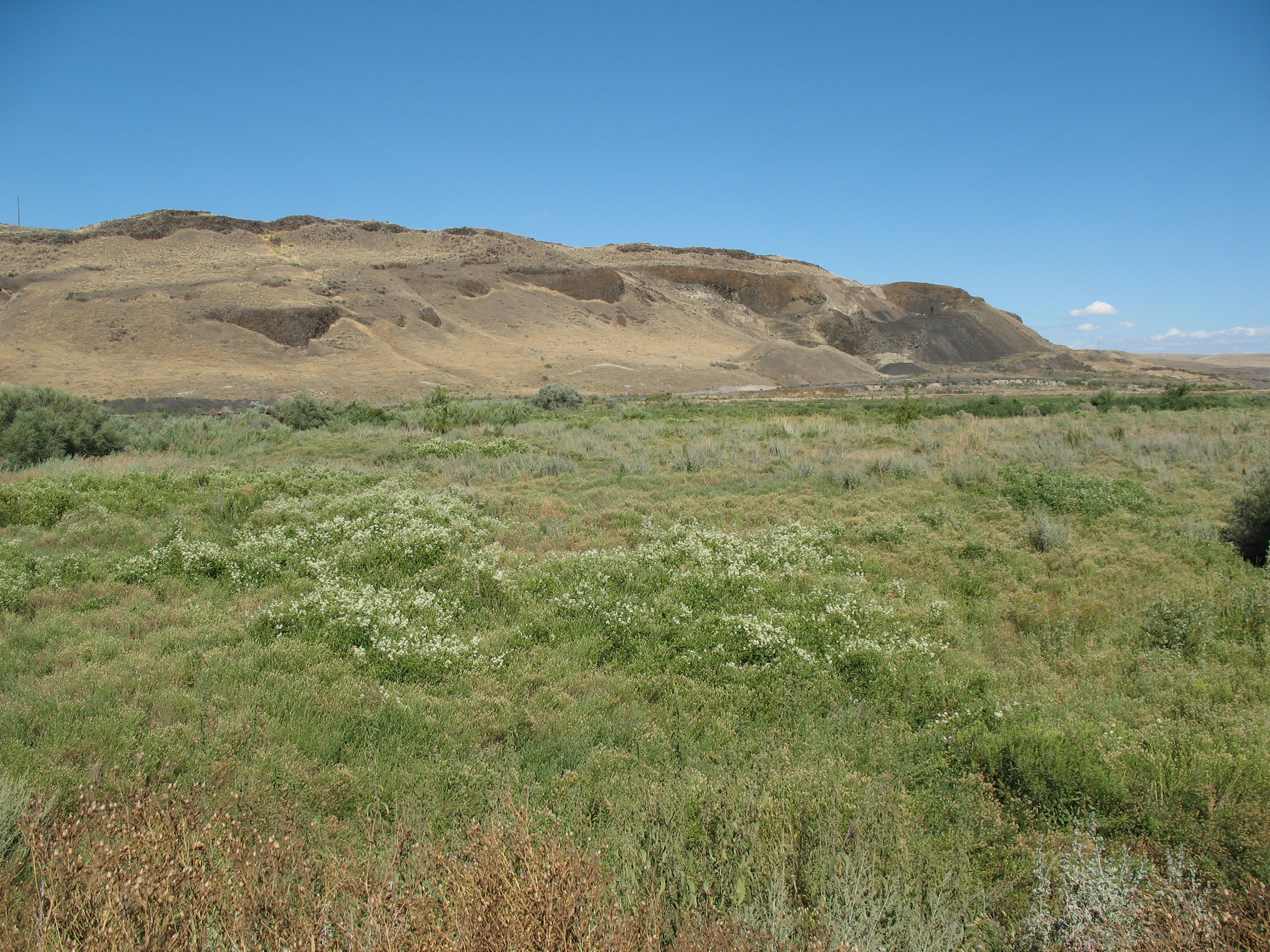
A desert meadow near Walla Walla, Washington USA

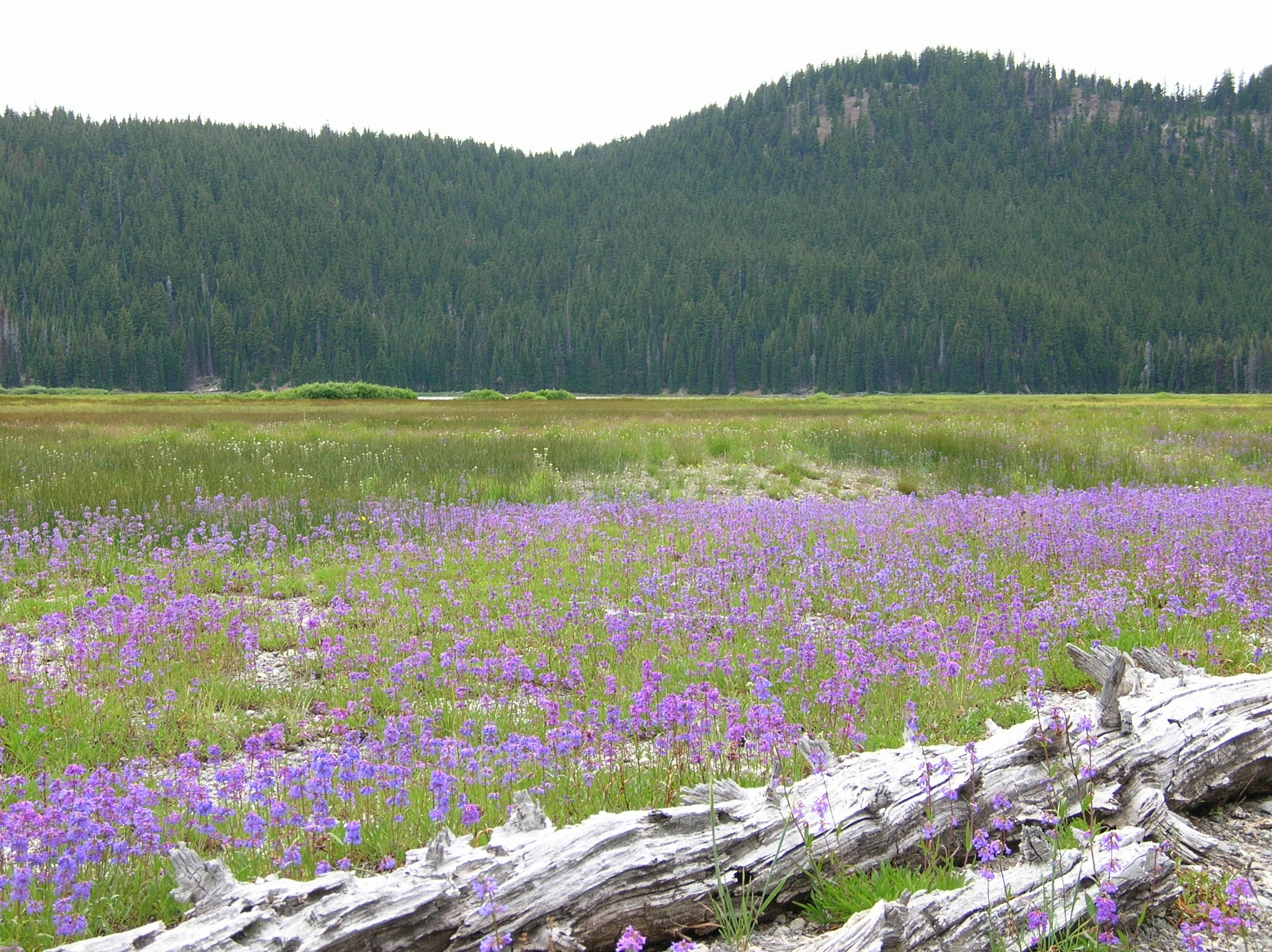
Perpetual meadows in Oregon, USA

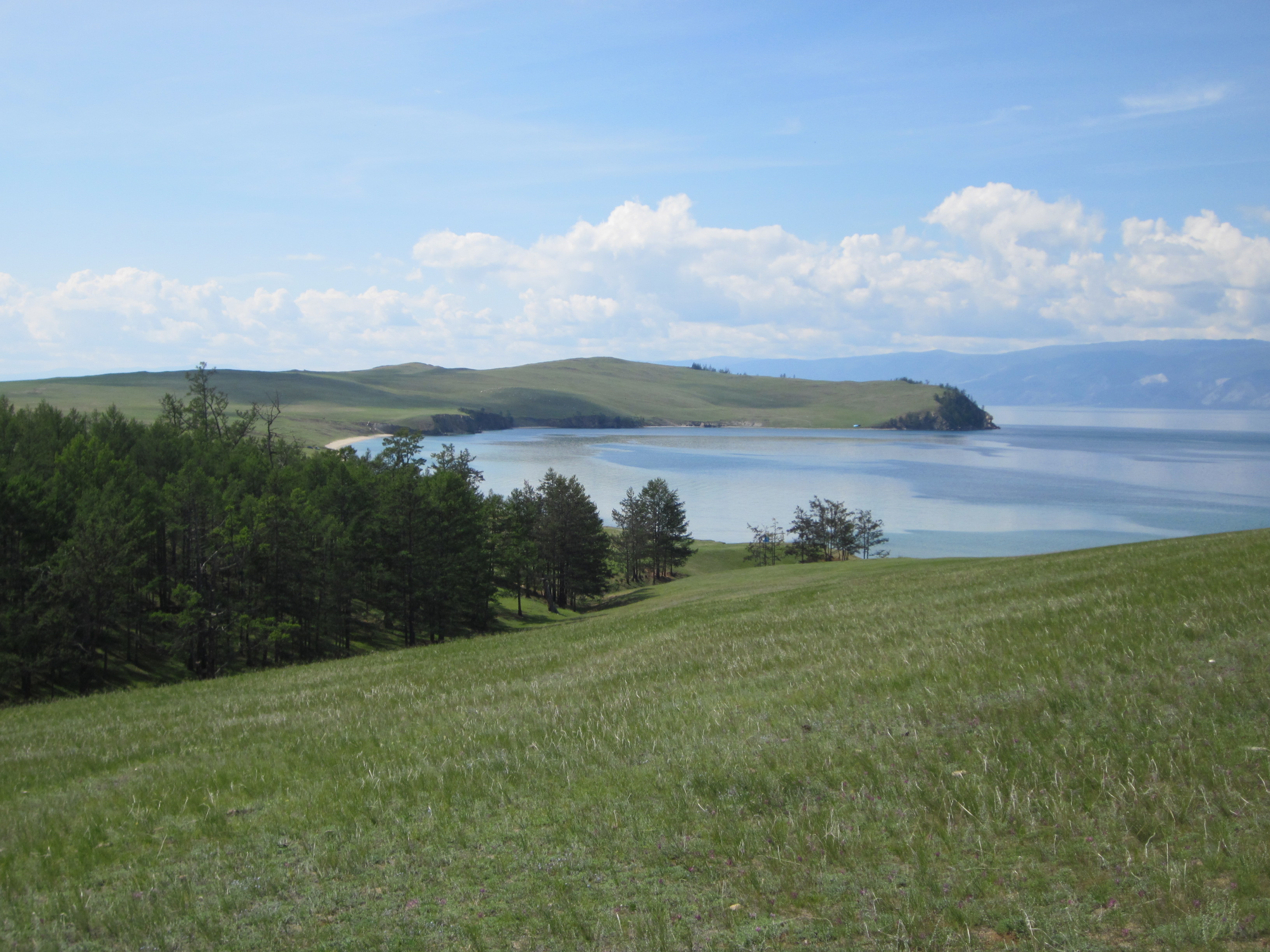
Natural meadows and grasslands at Lake Baikal, Russia

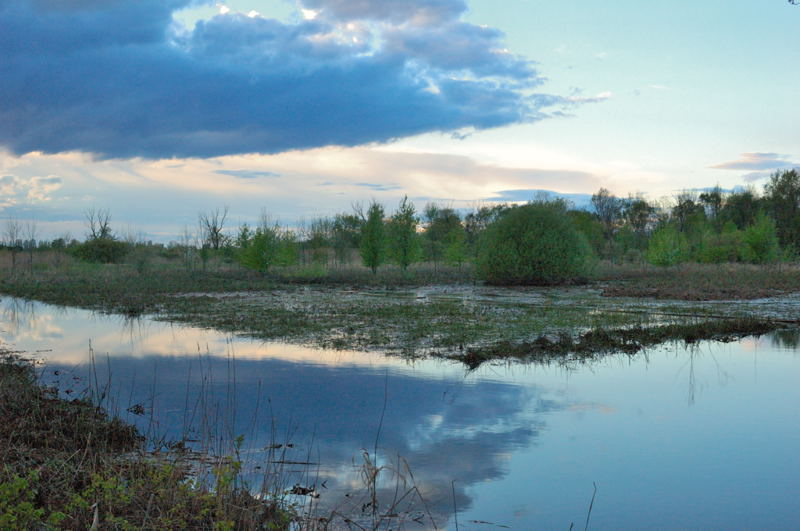
Flood meadow near Hohenau an der March, Austria

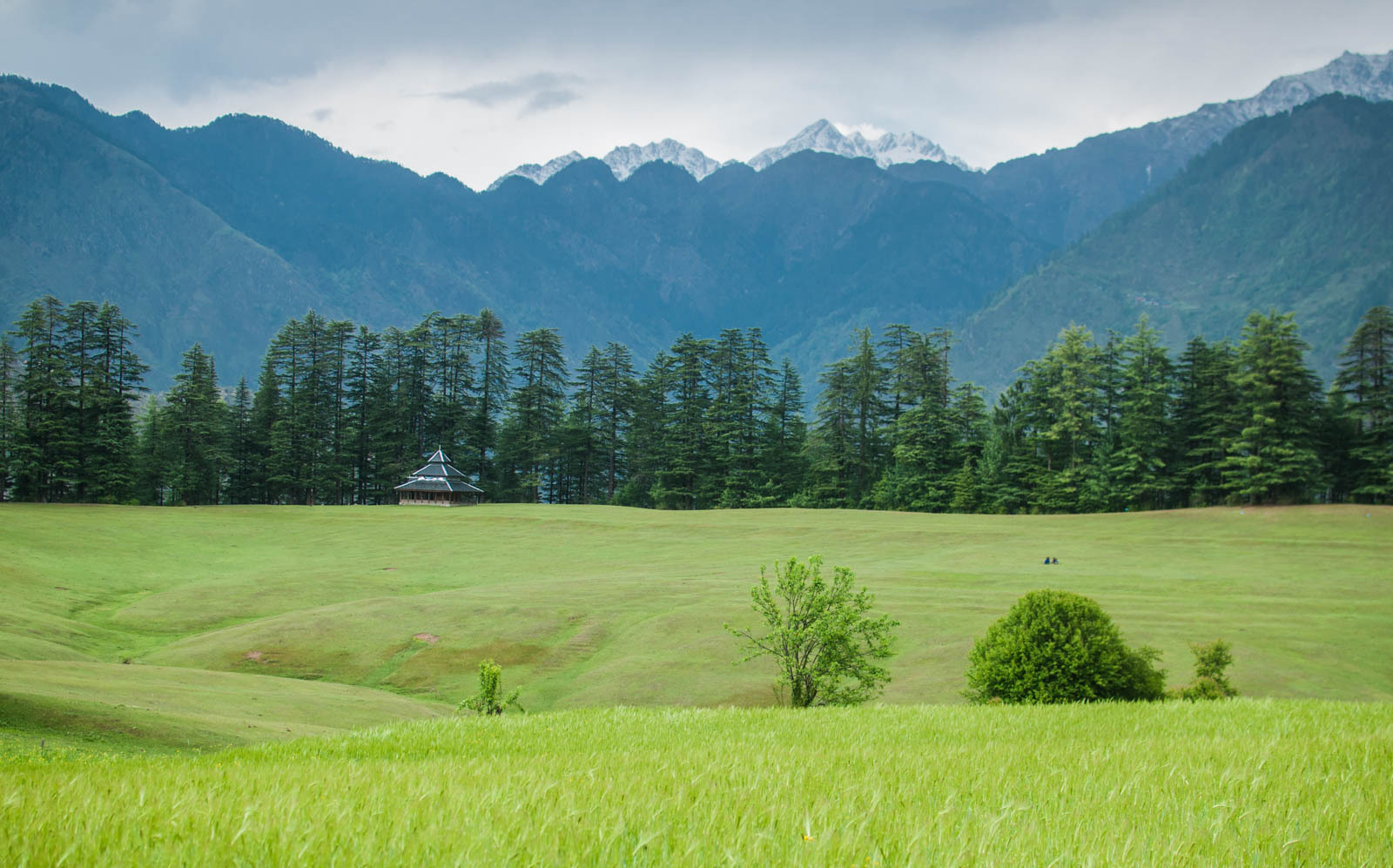
Meadows in Shangarh, Himachal Pradesh, India

=== Urban meadow ===
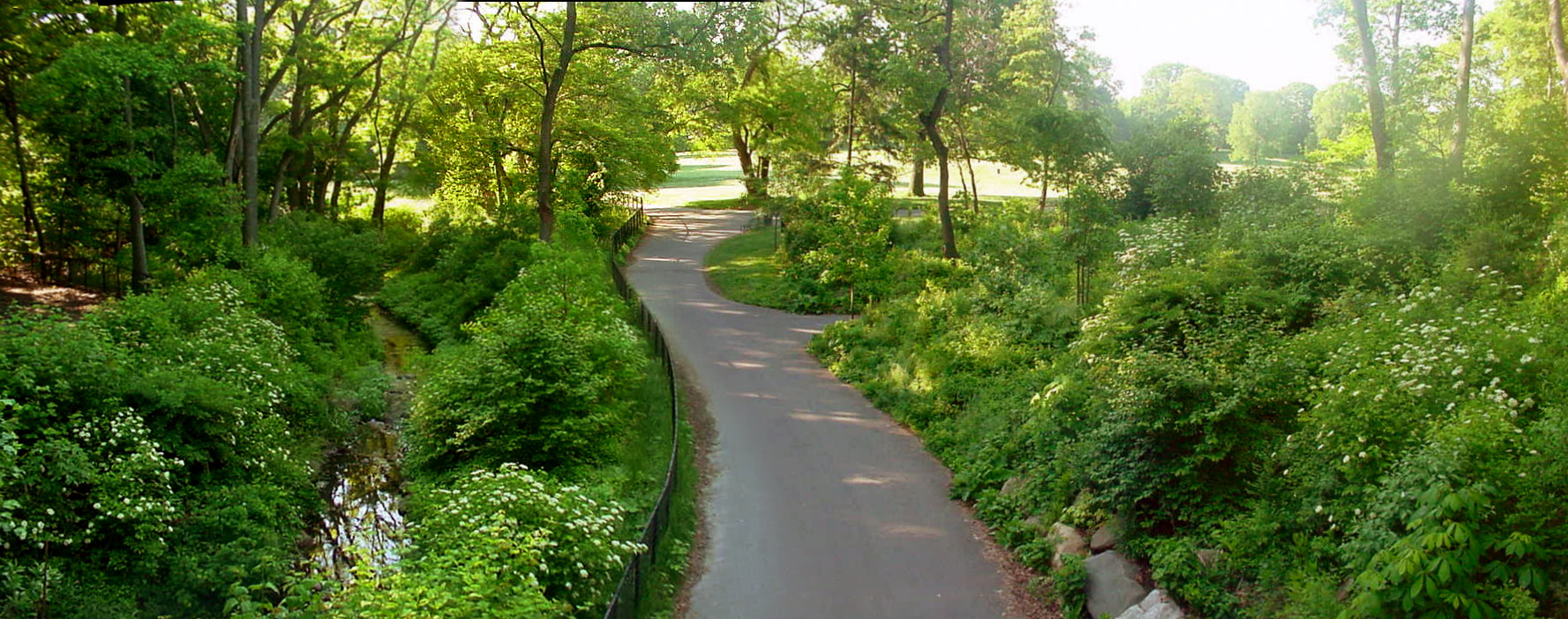
Southward view from the Nethermead Arches toward the Nethermead urban meadow in Prospect Park, Brooklyn, New York City

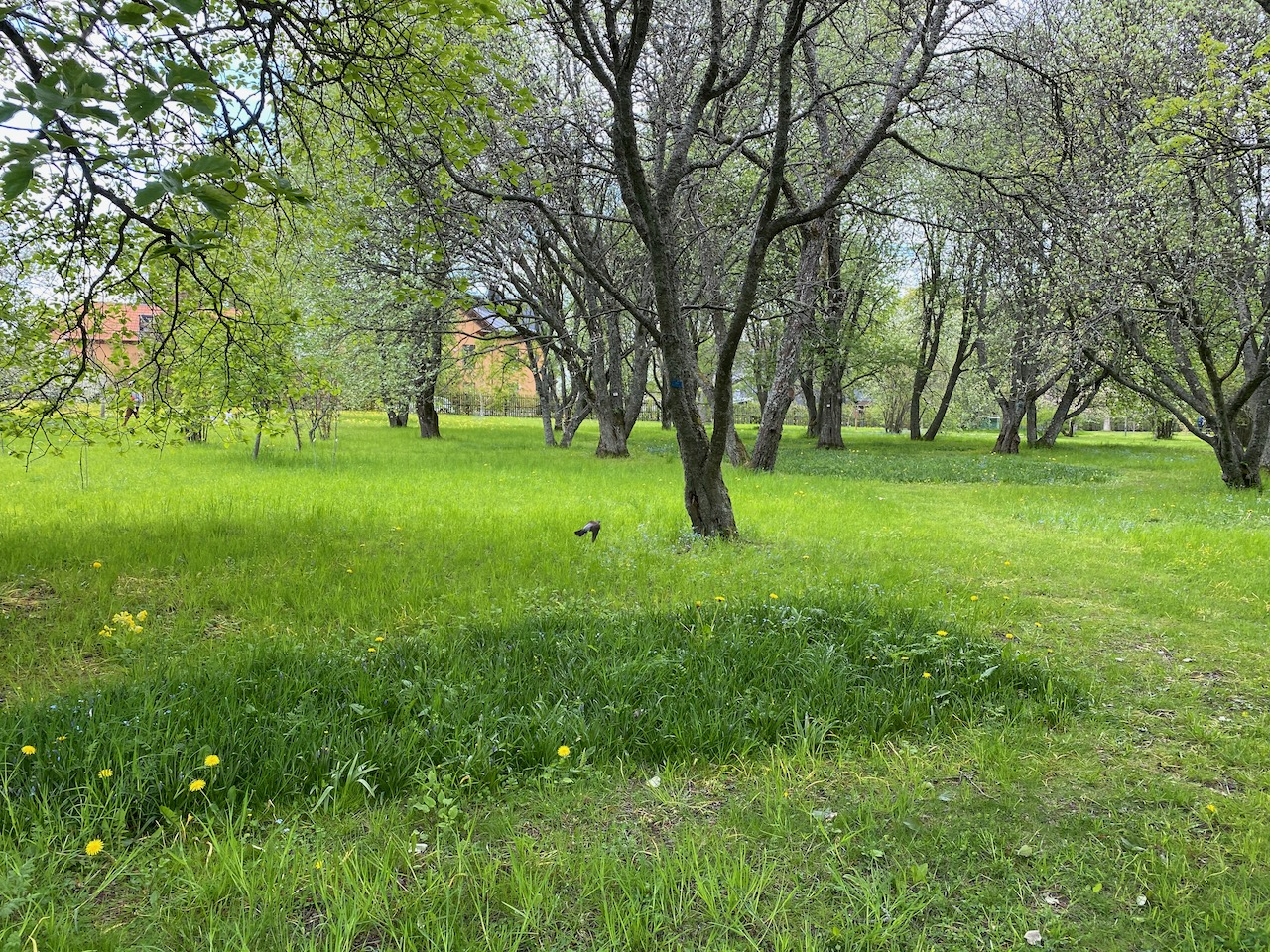
Urban Meadow at Botaniska Trädgården, Uppsala, Sweden

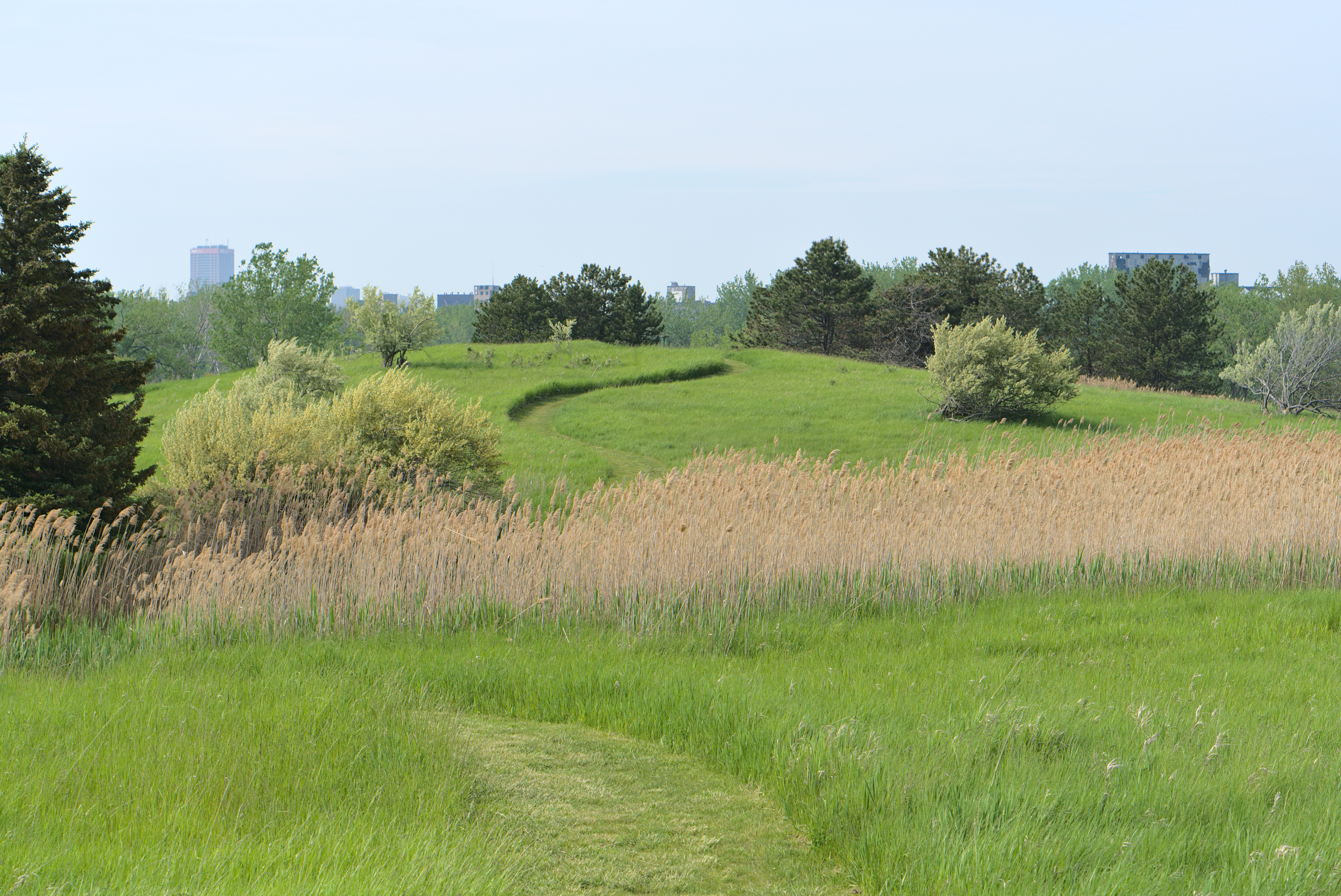
An urban meadow at Tifft Nature Preserve in Buffalo, New York

Recently, urban areas have been thought of as potential biodiversity conservation sites. The shift from urban lawns, that are widely spread habitats in cities, to urban meadows is thought to promote greater refuges for plant and animal communities. Urban lawns require intensive management that puts the life there at risk of losing their habitat, especially due to the mowing frequency. Cutting that mowing frequency has demonstrated to induce a clear positive effect on the plant community's diversity, which allows the switch from urban lawns to urban meadows.

Due to increased urbanization, the EU Biodiversity Strategy 2017 decreed that there is a need to protect all ecosystems due to climate change. The majority of the people that live in the urban regions of any country usually get their plant knowledge from visiting parks and or public green infrastructure. Local authorities have the duty of providing the green spaces for the public, but these departments are constantly suffering major budget cuts, making it more difficult for people to admire natural wildlife in the urban sectors and also impairing the local ecosystem. In line with the increasing acceptance of a "messier urban aesthetic", the perennial meadows can be seen as a more realistic alternative to the classic urban lawns as they would also be more cost-efficient to maintain. Factors that managers of urban spaces list as important to regard are:

- Aesthetics and public reaction
- Locational context
- Human Resources and economic sustainability
- Local politics
- Communication
- Biodiversity and existing habitat
- Physical factors.

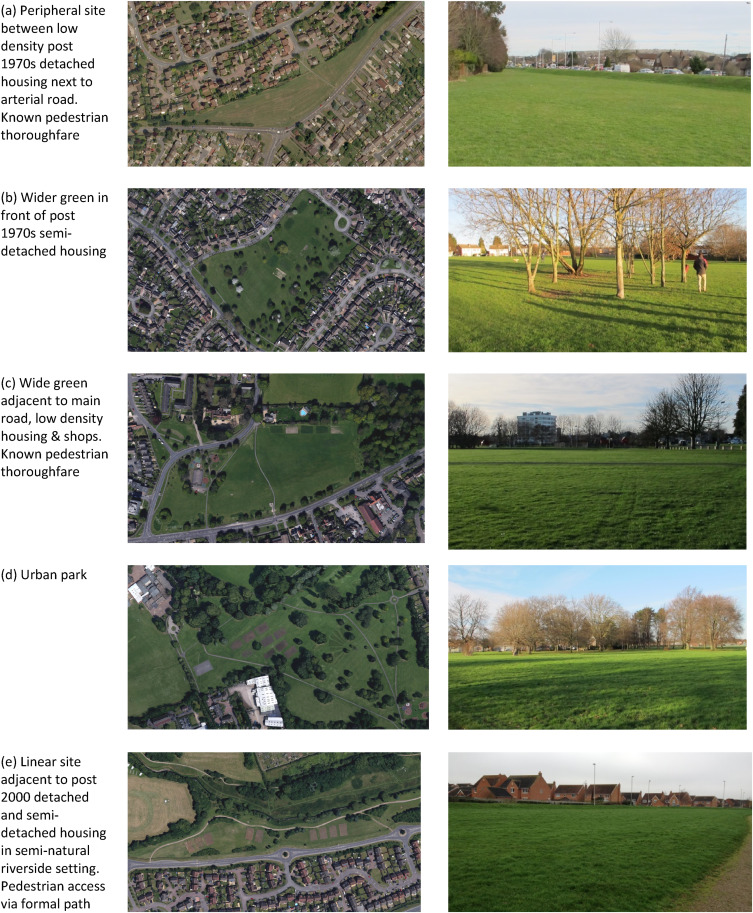
Urban meadows in comparison

== Human intervention ==
Artificially or culturally conceived meadows emerge from and continually require human intervention to persist and flourish. In many places, the natural, pristine populations of free-roaming large grazers are either extinct or very limited due to human activities. This reduces or removes their natural influence on the surrounding ecology and results in meadows only being created or maintained by human intervention. Existing meadows could potentially and gradually decline, if unmaintained by agricultural practices. Humankind has influenced the ecology and the landscape for millennia in many parts of the world, so it can sometimes be difficult to discern what is natural and what is cultural. Meadows are one example. However, meadows seem to have been sustained historically by naturally occurring large grazers, which kept plant growth in checked and maintained the cleared space.

As extensive farming like grazing is diminishing in some parts of the world, the meadow is endangered as a habitat. A number of research projects attempt to restore natural meadow habitats by reintroducing natural, large grazers. These include deer, elk, goat, wild horse, etc. depending on the location. A more exotic example with a wider scope is the European Tauros Programme.

Some environmental organization recommend converting lawns to meadows by stopping or reducing mowing. They claim that meadows can better preserve biodiversity, water, reduce the use of fertilizers. For example, in 2018 environmental organizations with the support of the Department for Environment Food and Rural Affairs of England, concerned by the decline in the number of bees worldwide, in the first day of Bees' Needs Week 2018 (9–15 July) give some recommendation how to preserve bees. The recommendations include 1) growing flowers, shrubs, and trees, 2) letting the garden grow wild, 3) cutting grass less often, 4) leaving insect nest and hibernation spots alone, and 5) using careful consideration with pesticides.

=== Impact of tourism ===
The impact of human activity has been noted to increase degradation of meadow soil. This has contributed to landslides in Sholas. E.g. due to skiing activities and urbanization, the meadows of the town of Zakopane, Poland, were noted to have altered soil compositions. The soil's organic material had faded away and was affected due to the chemicals from the artificial melting water from the snow and skiing machinery.

== Meadows and climate change ==
=== Ecological consequences ===
Climate changes impact temperature precipitation patterns worldwide. The effects are regionally very different but generally, temperatures tend to increase, snowpacks tend to melt earlier and many places tend to become drier. Many species respond to these changes by slowly moving their habitat upwards. The increased elevation decreases mean temperatures and thus allows for species to largely maintain their original habitat. Another common response to changed environmental conditions are phenological adaptations. These include shifts in the timing of germination or blossoming. Other examples include changing migration patterns of birds of passage. These adaptations are primarily influenced by three drivers:

- Increased temperature
- Changing precipitation patterns
- Reduced snowpack and earlier melting

In the meadows, as water turned out to be all the more scant, that implies less dampness for the plants. The blooming plants do not develop too and hence do not give much food to the creatures. These kinds of changes in plants could influence the population of buffalo just as numerous other creatures, including bugs and insects.

==== Effects of higher temperatures ====
In response to temperature changes, flowering plants can respond through either spatial or temporal shifts. A spatial shift refers to the migration towards colder areas, often on higher altitudes. A temporal shift means that a plant may alter its phenology to blossom at a different time of the year. By moving towards the early spring or late autumn they can restore their previous temperature conditions. These adaptations are limited. Spatial shifts may be difficult if the areas are already inhabited by other species, or when the plant is reliant on specific hydrology or soil type. Other authors have shown that higher temperatures can increase total biomass, but temperature shocks and instability seem to have negative impacts on biodiversity. This even appears to be the case for multiyear species, which were previously considered to have a buffering effect on extreme weather events.

==== Effects of changing precipitation patterns ====
There is a variety of hydrological regimes for meadows, ranging from dry to humid, each yielding different plant communities adapted to the respective provider of water. A shift in precipitation patterns has very different effects, depending on the type of meadow. Meadows that are either dry or wet appear to be rather resilient to change, as a moderate increase or decrease in precipitation does not radically alter their character. Meanwhile, mesic meadows, with a moderate supply of water do change their character as it is easier to tip them into a different regime. Dry meadows in particular are threatened by the invasion of shrubs and other woody plants and a decreasing prevalence of flowering forbs, whereas hydric sites tend to lose woody species. Due to the dryer upper soil layers, forbs with shallow roots have difficulties obtaining enough water. Woody plants in contrast with their lower-reaching root systems can still extract water stored in lower soil layers and are able to sustain themselves through longer drought periods with their stored water reserves. In the longer term, changing hydrologic regimes may also facilitate the establishment of invasive species that may be better adapted to the new conditions. The effects are already quite visible, an example is the substitution of Alpine meadows in the southern Himalayas through shrubland. Climate change appears to be an important driver of this process. Wetter winters in contrast might increase total biomass, but favour already competitive species. By harming specialised plants and promoting the prevalence of more generalist species, more unstable precipitation patterns could also reduce ecological biodiversity.

==== Effects of reduced snowpacks ====
Snow covers are directly related to changes in temperature, precipitation and cloud cover. Still, changes in the timing of the snowmelt seem to be, particularly in alpine regions, an important determinant for phenological responses. Data suggests that the impact of snowmelt is greater than the warming alone. Snowmelt beginning earlier is not uniformly positive for plants, because moisture injected through snowmelt will be scarce earlier in the season. Additionally, it might allow for longer periods of seed predation. Also problematic is the lack of the insulating snow cover, possibly resulting in springtime frost events to have a greater negative impact.

==== Effects on ecological communities ====
All the drivers mentioned above give rise to complex, non-linear community responses. These responses can be disentangled by looking at multiple climate drivers and species together. As different species show varying degrees of phenological responses, the consequence is a so-called phenological reassembly, where the structure of the ecosystem changes fundamentally. Phenological responses in blossoming periods of certain plants may not coincide with the phenological shifts of their pollinators or growing periods of plant communities relying on each other may start to diverge. A study of meadows in the Rocky Mountains revealed the emergence of a mid-season period with little floral activity. Specifically, the study identified that the typical mid-summer floral peak was composed out of several consecutive peaks in dry, mesic and wet meadow systems. Phenological responses to climate change let these distinct peaks diverge, leading to a gap during mid-summer. This poses a threat to pollinators relying on a continuous supply of floral resources. As ecological communities are often highly adapted to local circumstances which can not be reproduced at higher elevations, Debinski et al. describe the short-term changes observed on meadows "as a shift in the mosaic of the landscape composition". Therefore, it is important to monitor not only how specific species respond to climate change, but to also investigate them in the context of different habitats they occur in.

=== Phenological reassembly ===
Animals and plants are changing rapidly due to anthropogenic global warming. The number of individuals, habitat occupancy, changing reproductive cycles are occurring strategies to adapt to severe and unpredictable environment alterations. The different types of meadows all around the planet are different communities of plants (perennial and annual plants) that are constantly interacting with each other to stay alive and reproduce. Timing and duration of flowering is one of the phenological reassembly driven by many different factors like snow melt, temperature and soil moisture. All of the changes that a plant or an animal may go through are dependent on the habitat's topography, altitude, and latitude of a specific organism. It is important to properly monitor the flora because they are one of the best bioindicators of how climate change is affecting the planet.

Flowering phenology is a key aspect of plant adaptation to environmental adversity. Plant species and the suite of adaptations they use throughout the year can be monitored in order to understand how each survives. In an alpine meadow in eastern Tibet, similarities and differences are evident between annual and perennial plant species, underpinning species diversity. The peak flowering date and the duration of flowering were negatively related for annual species, which flowered for longer than perennials, and a range of other functional traits were found to be more or less related to phenology.

=== Extreme weather ===
Climate change is increasing temperatures all over the world, and boreal regions are more susceptible to suffer noticeable changes. An experiment was conducted to monitor the reaction of alpine arctic meadow plants to different patterns of increased temperatures. This experiment was based on vascular plants that live in arctic and subarctic environments within three different levels of vegetation: canopy layer, bottom layer and functional groups. It is crucial to keep in mind that these plants are usually sharing the space and constantly interacting with bryophytes, lichens, arthropods, animals and many other organisms. The result was a clear adaptation of a constant pattern that plants recognized and had time to reach thermal acclimation meaning that they got a net carbon gain by intensifying photosynthesis and slightly increasing respiration thanks to a warmer climate for a reasonable time period. However, plants that suffer changes of any kind (not only temperature rising and falling) in a short period of time are more likely to die because they did not have enough time to reach thermal acclimation.

=== Meadow restorations ===
==== Carbon storage in meadows ====
Meadows can act as substantial sinks and sources of organic carbon, holding vast quantities of it in the soil. The fluxes of carbon depend mainly on the natural cycle of carbon uptake and efflux, which interplays with seasonal variations (e.g. non-growing vs growing season). The wide range of meadow subtypes have in turn differing attributes (like plant configurations) affecting the area's ability to act as sinks; seagrass meadows are for instant identified as some of the more important sinks in the global carbon cycle. In the instance of seagrass meadows, enhanced production of other greenhouse gases (CH_{4} and N_{2}O) does occur but the estimated overall effect results in an offset of the total emission. Meanwhile, a usual driver of meadow loss (except for direct alterations due to human development) is climate change, consequently increasing carbon emissions and bringing up the topic of restoration projects which in some cases have prompted initiated meadow restorations (e.g. Zostera marina meadow in Virginia U.S.A).

==== Grassland degradations ====
Where grassland degradation has occurred, significant alterations to the carbon dioxide efflux during the non-growing season may take place. Both climate change and overgrazing factor into the degradation. As exemplified by the alpine wetland meadow on the Qinghai-Tibetan Plateau, there is the potential of being a moderate source of CO_{2} and a carbon sink, due to high soil organic content and low decomposition. The more the dynamics have been quantified, however, the effects of degradation become more tangible. A strong connection between grassland degradation and soil carbon loss has been seen, pinpointing that carbon dioxide release is being stimulated by this event. This subsequently indicates a climate change mitigation potential by restoring degraded grassland.

==== Cap-and-trade ====
Being a market-based regulation of emissions, the cap-and-trade system can sometimes incorporate restoration projects for climate mitigation. For example, the cap-and-trade program in California is looking at how meadow restorations can be incorporated into their system of reducing carbon emissions. Audubon's preliminary studies point to the potential of storing a substantially increased amount of soil carbon compared to degraded meadows while boosting the local biodiversity. Most recently though, during the COVID-19 pandemic, difficulties with restoration are beginning to show: During the first years, areas under restoration are vulnerable to outside disruption, like meadow management put on hold when the ecosystem is most sensitive, for example to invasive species.

== See also ==
Some subtypes of meadows:
- Alpine meadows
- Beach meadow
- Coastal meadow
- Fen-meadow
- Flood-meadow
- Montane meadow
- Seagrass meadow
- Tapestry lawn
- Water-meadow
- Wet meadow
- Wooded meadows
Closely related habitats:
- Coastal plain
- Flooded grasslands and savannas
- Marsh
- Pampa
- Plain
- Plateau
- Rangeland
- Savanna
- Sods
- Steppe
- Tundra
- Veld
