= Vigra Municipality =

Former municipality in Møre og Romsdal, Norway

Vigra Municipality Vigra herad
- Former municipality
- Roald herred (historic name)
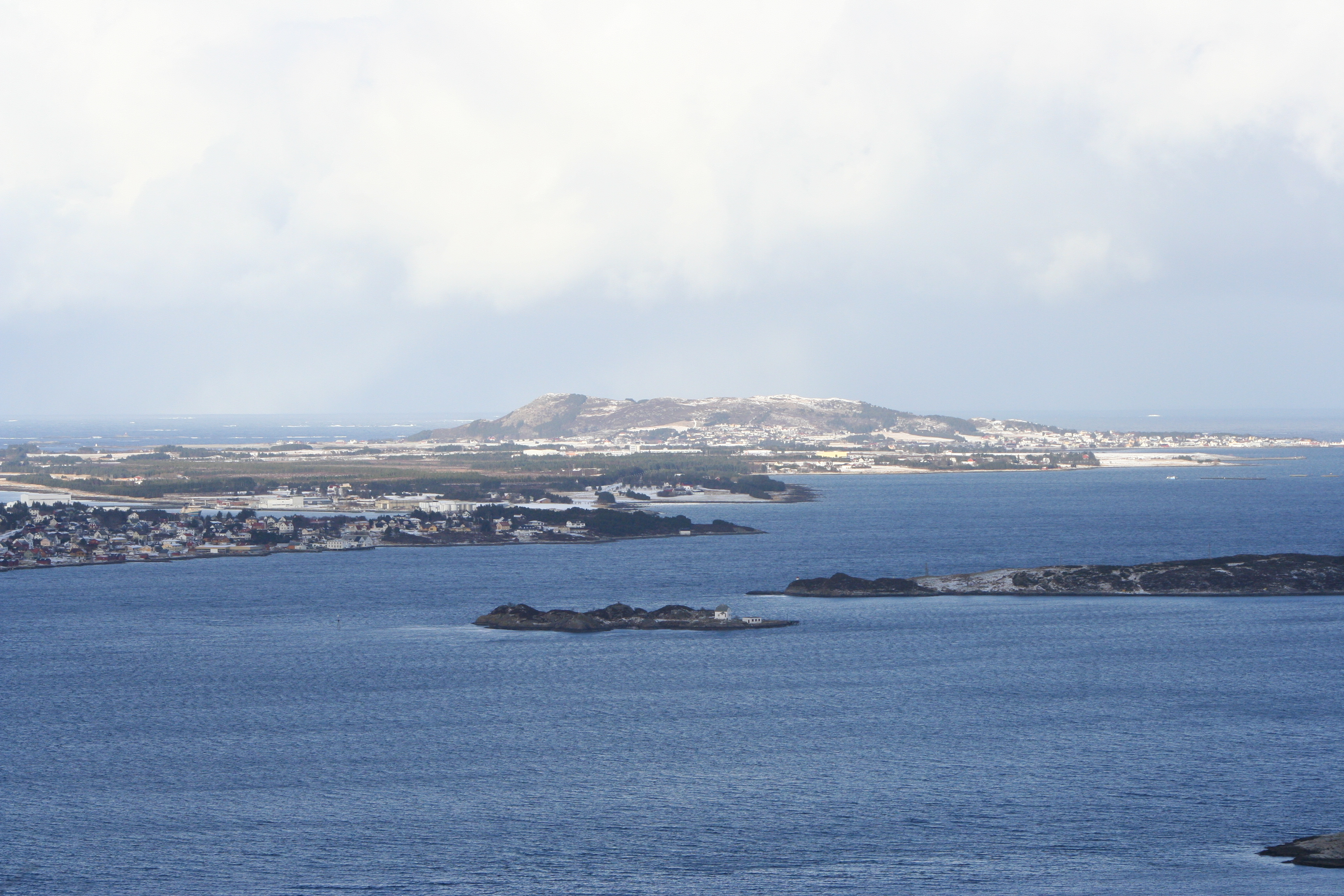
- View of Vigra island

- Møre og Romsdal within Norway

- Vigra within Møre og Romsdal
- Coordinates: 62°33′28″N 06°04′42″E
- Country: Norway
- County: Møre og Romsdal
- District: Sunnmøre
- Established: 1 Jan 1890
  - Preceded by: Haram Municipality
- Disestablished: 1 Jan 1964
  - Succeeded by: Giske Municipality
- Administrative centre: Roald

Government
  - Mayor (1959–1963): Karl O. Blindheim (LL)

Area (upon dissolution)
  - Total: 20.1 km^{2} (7.8 sq mi)
  - Rank: #627 in Norway
- Highest elevation: 122 m (400 ft)

Population (1963)
  - Total: 1,571
  - Rank: #528 in Norway
  - Density: 78.2/km^{2} (203/sq mi)
  - Change (10 years): ▲ +15.5%
- Demonym: Vigring

Official language
  - Norwegian form: Nynorsk
- Time zone: UTC+01:00 (CET)
  - Summer (DST): UTC+02:00 (CEST)
- ISO 3166 code: NO-1533

Vigra is a former municipality in Møre og Romsdal county, Norway. The 20-square-kilometre (7.7 sq mi) municipality existed from 1890 until its dissolution in 1964. The area is now part of Giske Municipality in the traditional district of Sunnmøre. The administrative centre was the village of Roald and Vigra Church was the main church for the municipality.

Prior to its dissolution in 1964, the 20.1-square-kilometre (7.8 sq mi) municipality was the 627th largest by area out of the 689 municipalities in Norway. Vigra Municipality was the 528th most populous municipality in Norway with a population of about 1,571. The municipality's population density was 78.2 inhabitants per square kilometre (203/sq mi) and its population had increased by 15.5% over the previous 10-year period.

== General information ==
On 1 January 1890, the large Haram Municipality was divided. The western island district (population: 794) was established as the new Roald Municipality and the rest remained as Haram Municipality (population: 1,956). In 1911, the name was changed to Vigra Municipality.

During the 1960s, there were many municipal mergers across Norway due to the work of the Schei Committee. On 1 January 1964, Vigra Municipality (population: 1,569) was merged with the neighboring Giske Municipality (population: 3,075) to create a new, larger Giske Municipality.

=== Name ===
The municipality was originally named Roald Municipality, after the old Roald farm (Old Norse: Róǫld) which was likely the original name of the island as well (later the island became known as Vigra). The meaning of the name is unknown. On 3 November 1917, a royal resolution changed the name to Vigra Municipality. The new name was chosen since it is the name of the main island in the municipality, Vigra (Old Norse: Vigr). The name is derived from the word vígr which means "spear". It is likely that a peninsula of the island was being compared to the shape of a spear blade.

=== Churches ===
The Church of Norway had one parish (sokn) within Vigra Municipality. At the time of the municipal dissolution, it was part of the Haram prestegjeld and the Nordre Sunnmøre prosti (deanery) in the Diocese of Bjørgvin.

Churches in Vigra Municipality
Parish (sokn)	Church name	Location of the church	Year built
Vigra	Vigra Church	Vigra	1894

== Geography ==
The municipality included the island of Vigra along with many smaller islets surrounding it. The highest point in the municipality was the 122-metre (400 ft) tall mountain Molnesfjellet. The island municipality was surrounded by Giske Municipality to the south and Haram Municipality to the north and east.

== Government ==
Vigra Municipality was responsible for primary education (through 10th grade), outpatient health services, senior citizen services, welfare and other social services, zoning, economic development, and municipal roads and utilities. The municipality was governed by a municipal council of directly elected representatives. The mayor was indirectly elected by a vote of the municipal council. The municipality was under the jurisdiction of the Frostating Court of Appeal.

=== Municipal council ===
The municipal council (Heradsstyre) of Vigra Municipality was made up of 13 representatives that were elected to four year terms. The tables below show the historical composition of the council by political party.

Vigra heradsstyre 1959–1963
Party name (in Nynorsk)	Number of representatives
Labour Party (Arbeidarpartiet)	2
Local List(s) (Lokale lister)	11
Total number of members:	13
Note: On 1 January 1964, Vigra Municipality became part of Giske Municipality.

Vigra heradsstyre 1955–1959
Party name (in Nynorsk)	Number of representatives
Labour Party (Arbeidarpartiet)	2
Local List(s) (Lokale lister)	11
Total number of members:	13

Vigra heradsstyre 1951–1955
Party name (in Nynorsk)	Number of representatives
Labour Party (Arbeidarpartiet)	3
Local List(s) (Lokale lister)	9
Total number of members:	12

Vigra heradsstyre 1947–1951
Party name (in Nynorsk)	Number of representatives
Labour Party (Arbeidarpartiet)	3
Local List(s) (Lokale lister)	9
Total number of members:	12

Vigra heradsstyre 1945–1947
Party name (in Nynorsk)	Number of representatives
Labour Party (Arbeidarpartiet)	3
Local List(s) (Lokale lister)	9
Total number of members:	12

Vigra heradsstyre 1937–1941*
Party name (in Nynorsk)	Number of representatives
Labour Party (Arbeidarpartiet)	2
Local List(s) (Lokale lister)	10
Total number of members:	12
Note: Due to the German occupation of Norway during World War II, no elections were held for new municipal councils until after the war ended in 1945.

=== Mayors ===
The mayor (Nynorsk: ordførar) of Vigra Municipality was the political leader of the municipality and the chairperson of the municipal council. The following people have held this position:

- 1890–1891: Johannes O. Rørvik (V)
- 1892–1897: Hans Roald (MV)
- 1898–1901: Johan O. Synnes (MV/H)
- 1902–1919: Ole N. Blindheim
- 1920–1922: Johan Roald
- 1923–1928: Olav M. Synnes
- 1929–1931: Ole Jakob Blindheim (V)
- 1932–1935: Olav M. Synnes
- 1935–1941: Andreas K. Roald
- 1941–1945: Knut Gamlem (NS)
- 1945–1948: Salamon H. Røsvik
- 1948–1955: Oskar Stinessen (Ap)
- 1956–1959: Johan J. Roaldsand
- 1959–1963: Karl O. Blindheim (LL)

== See also ==
- List of former municipalities of Norway
