= Giske Wildlife Sanctuary =

Protected area in Norway

- Giske dyrefredningsområde
- IUCN category IV (habitat/species management area)
- Interactive map of Giske Wildlife Sanctuary
- Nearest city: Giske
- Coordinates: 62°30′10″N 6°1′38″E
- Area: 145.7 ha (360 acres)
- Established: 1988

Ramsar Wetland
- Designated: 18 March 1996
- Part of: Giske Wetlands System
- Reference no.: 805

The Giske Wildlife Sanctuary (Norwegian: Giske dyrefredningsområde) is located in the Makkevika inlet on the island of Giske in Giske Municipality in Møre og Romsdal county, Norway.

The area received protection in 1988 "to preserve an important wetland area with its habitat, bird life and other wildlife", according to the conservation regulations. The inlet is a resting place for wetland birds, especially waders, and it is also an important overwintering place and has a strong nesting population. Six of the bird species that have been observed here are of international importance, 21 species are of national importance, and 35 are of regional importance. The landscape consists of varied seaside vegetation with wash margins and salt pans. Beach meadows and ponds lie inland from the beach. A pebble beach is also of geological interest.

Makkevika has a bird-ringing station and is one of the best-described bird locations in Norway. The area largely borders cultivated land, and it is surrounded by a buffer area measuring 13.8 square kilometers (5.3 sq mi) that received protection at the same time.

The wildlife sanctuary is one of six natural areas that were included in the Giske Wetlands System Ramsar site, which was established in 1996.
