= Vigra transmitter =

Former transmitter facility in Norway

Coordinates: 62.5412°N 6.0510°E

Vigra transmitter was a transmitter facility for medium wave broadcasting near Vigra in Norway. The Vigra transmitter was inaugurated by the Norwegian Broadcasting Corporation (NRK) in 1934 (91 years ago). It was used until 1953 for transmission with a T-antenna. This antenna was replaced in 1952/53 by a guyed, steel-tube mast radiator insulated against the earth with a height of 243 metres (797 ft). In 1999, the height of the mast was reduced for air traffic safety reasons to 232 metres (761 ft).

The Vigra transmitter frequency was 630 kHz with a power of 100 kilowatts (130 hp), enabling it to be received at night in much of Europe, with the daytime signal taking in Iceland, the Faroe, Shetland, and Orkney Islands, Scotland and up to Andøya Island in Norway.

The service was shut down on June 30, 2011 (14 years ago), and the 232 m (761 ft) high antenna was demolished on September 8, 2011 with help from the Norwegian Armed Forces using explosives.
