= CellCognition =

Software for microscopy

CellCognition Project
- Initial release: December 2009; 16 years ago
- Stable release: 1.6.1 / May 1, 2017; 8 years ago
- Operating system: Any (Python based)
- Type: Image processing & Computer vision & Machine Learning
- License: LGPL license
- Website: www.cellcognition-project.org

CellCognition is a free open-source computational framework for quantitative analysis of high-throughput fluorescence microscopy (time-lapse) images in the field of bioimage informatics and systems microscopy. The CellCognition framework uses image processing, computer vision and machine learning techniques for single-cell tracking and classification of cell morphologies. This enables measurements of temporal progression of cell phases, modeling of cellular dynamics and generation of phenotype map.

== Features ==
CellCognition uses a computational pipeline which includes image segmentation, object detection, feature extraction, statistical classification, tracking of individual cells over time, detection of class-transition motifs (e.g. cells entering mitosis), and HMM correction of classification errors on class labels.

The software is written in Python 2.7 and binaries are available for Windows and Mac OS X.

== History ==
CellCognition (Version 1.0.1) was first released in December 2009 by scientists from the Gerlich Lab and the Buhmann group at the Swiss Federal Institute of Technology Zürich and the Ellenberg Lab at the European Molecular Biology Laboratory Heidelberg. The latest release is 1.6.1 and the software is developed and maintained by the Gerlich Lab at the Institute of Molecular Biotechnology.

== Application ==
CellCognition has been used in RNAi-based screening, applied in basic cell cycle study, and extended to unsupervised modeling.
