= Vigra Church =

Church in Møre og Romsdal, Norway

- Vigra kyrkje
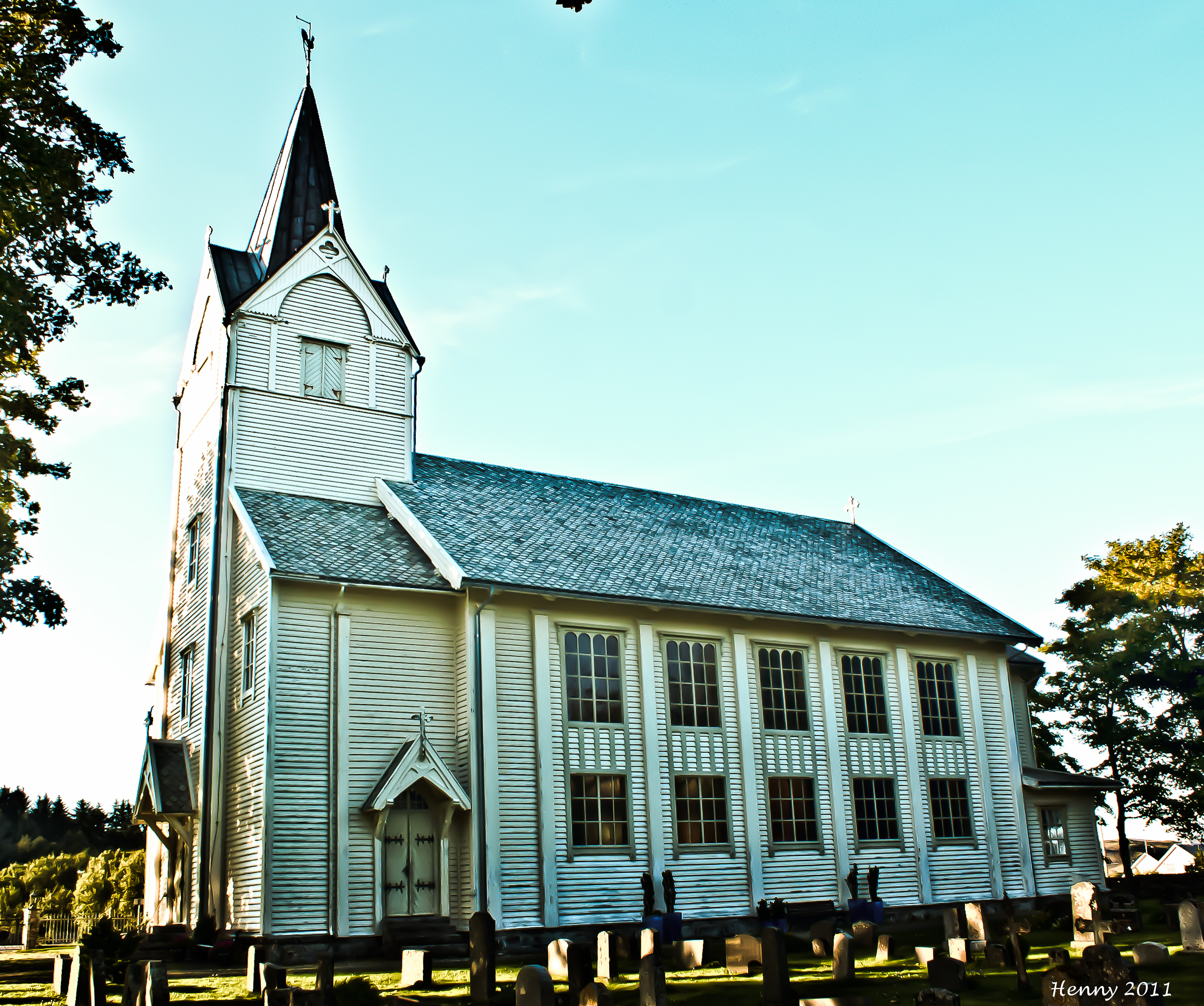
- View of the church
- Vigra Church
- 62°33′49″N 6°04′41″E
- Location: Giske Municipality, Møre og Romsdal
- Country: Norway
- Denomination: Church of Norway
- Churchmanship: Evangelical Lutheran

History
- Status: Parish church
- Founded: 13th century
- Consecrated: 24 January 1894

Architecture
- Functional status: Active
- Architect: Gabriel Smith
- Architectural type: Long church
- Completed: 1894 (132 years ago)

Specifications
- Capacity: 500
- Materials: Wood

Administration
- Diocese: Møre bispedømme
- Deanery: Nordre Sunnmøre prosti
- Parish: Vigra
- Norwegian Cultural Heritage Site
- Type: Church
- Status: Listed
- ID: 85832

Vigra Church (Norwegian: Vigra kyrkje) is a parish church of the Church of Norway in Giske Municipality in Møre og Romsdal county, Norway. It is located on the island of Vigra, about 3 kilometres (1.9 mi) southwest of the village of Roald. It is the church for the Vigra parish which is part of the Nordre Sunnmøre prosti (deanery) in the Diocese of Møre. The white, wooden church was built in a long church design in 1894 using plans drawn up by the architect Gabriel Smith. The church seats about 500 people.

== History ==
The earliest existing historical records of the church date back to 1432, but the church was not new at that time. The original Vigra Church was a wooden stave church that was located in the village of Roald, about 3 kilometres (1.9 mi) northeast of the present day site of the church. The church was possibly built in the 13th century. Very little is known about this old medieval stave church except that it existed until 1756 when it was struck by lightning and burned down. A new timber-framed, cruciform church was constructed on the same site in 1756. Over time, the new church was deemed to be too small, so on 12 December 1890, the parish council voted to build a new church. This time, it was decided to move the site of the church to the central part of the island, about 3 kilometres (1.9 mi) to the southwest. So, on 7 October 1892, a foundation stone was laid for the new church on the new site. On 24 January 1894, the Bishop Waldemar Hvoslef consecrated the new building for use. The cost of the new church was 26,500 kr. The old church building in Roald was torn down in the spring of 1896.

== See also ==
- List of churches in Møre
