= Coastal prairie =

Coastal prairie may refer to either:

- The California coastal prairie, a plant community found along the coasts of California and Oregon
- The Western Gulf coastal grasslands of Louisiana, Texas, and Tamaulipas
