= Beach meadow =

Coastal meadows affected by the salinity of the water

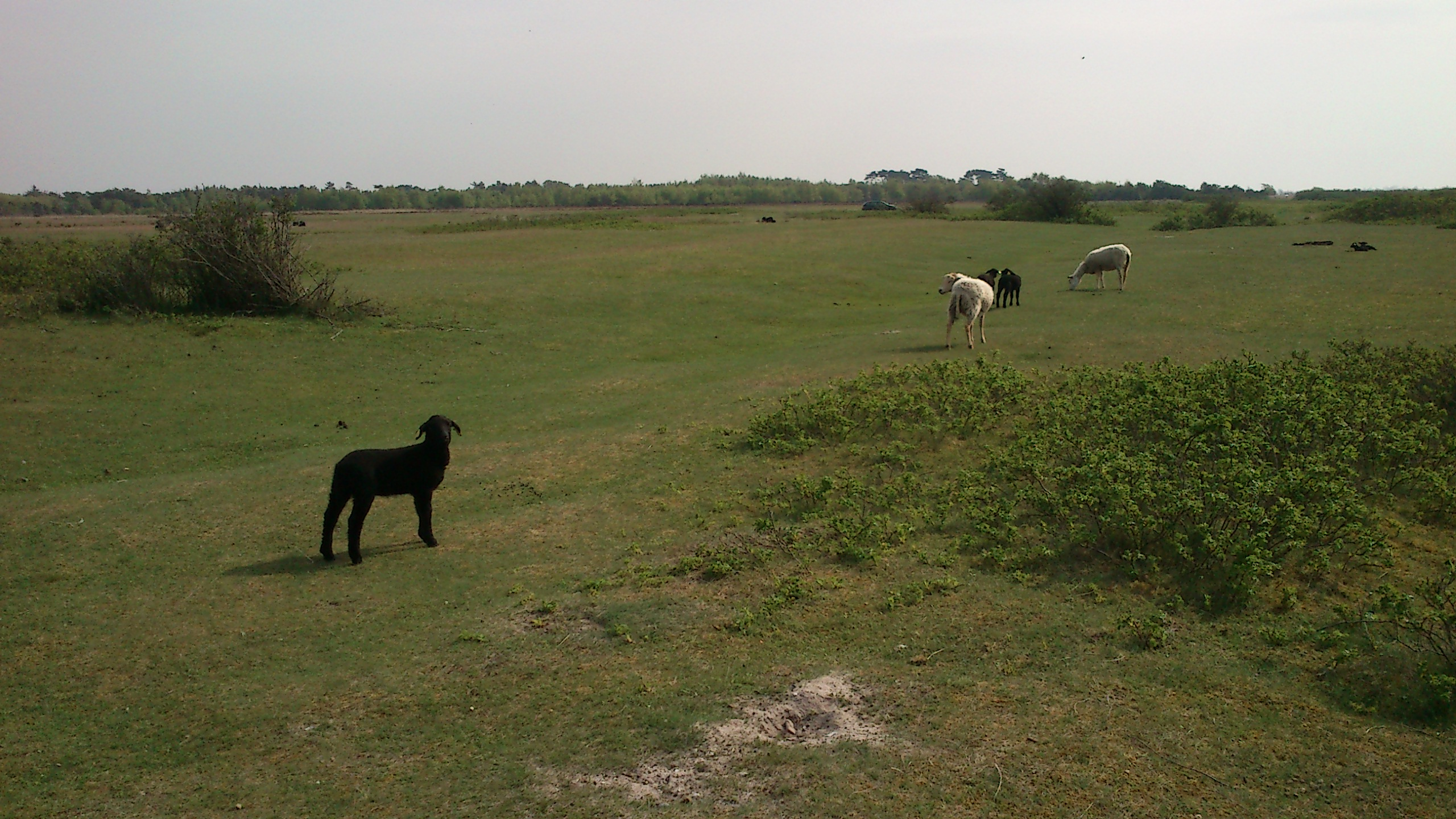
Beach meadows. The island of Endelave in Denmark.

Beach meadows are coastal meadows influenced by the presence of the nearby sea.

Under this definition, the salinity of the air and wind is always high and the meadows are often flooded during and after stormy weather. These conditions implies that the flora is dominated by salt-tolerant species. However, that alone does not make a meadow. To be categorized as a meadow in the first place, the plantgrowth has to be low in height, and normally this can only be achieved from wear by general traffic or grazing of the landscape, either artificially or by livestock. Beach meadows are therefore usually thought of as cultural landscapes or biotopes, requiring some degree of intervention and not being able to sustain itself on its own. If left to their own, beach meadows would usually transform into a so-called transitional meadow and eventually a shrubby or bushy seashore habitat.

== Flora and fauna ==
Beach meadows are fundamentally an unstable nature type and this condition have an important influence on the flora and fauna found here. Beach meadows are characterized by a number of plants and animals that could not have thrived if the habitat was left to a natural development. The grazing (or traffic) hinders bushes, trees and shrubs to get the upper hand and allows low-growth plants to emerge and dominate. This again attracts and supports a special fauna that would change character, if the beach meadow were left to its own. The specific flora and fauna is of course determined by the general climate and geography of the beach meadow.

=== Birds ===
Beach meadows offers a variety of opportunities to many birds, primarily waders, ducks and gulls. Many species are resting here during tides and they are feeding in the small ponds. A number of bird species use beach meadows as breeding grounds, especially on islands without predators like fox, mustelidae (raccoon dogs, wolverines, polecats, etc.) or the like. Introducing even small numbers of predators to beach meadow habitats, can wreak havoc on the bird populations, as predators have unrestricted access to eggs and birds.

== Notable beach meadow localities ==
Denmark has several beach meadows. Large and well-developed meadows can primarily be found in the Wadden Sea, Limfjord and Isefjord areas and on the islands of Læsø and Lolland, but there are many other smaller beach meadows throughout this low-lying country. On the Faroese Islands and in Greenland "fell meadows" can be found. They are usually not flooded by seawater, so it could be argued if they are truly beach meadows.

Iceland, Norway and some parts of Sweden, has extensive "fell meadows".

In the Baltic region, there are several beach meadows. Sweden can present true beach meadows on Öland and in some parts of Gotland, and Estonia has large beach meadows of international importance to migratory birds.

United Kingdom has several beach meadows throughout. They can be found in Cornwall and the country of Wales has several. Here the coast often consists of high cliffs, so the meadows are usually not flooded by seawater and strictly speaking they would be classified as "coastal meadows" or "fell meadows". Examples can be found on the Llŷn Peninsula, where cattle are grazing. Scotland has many fell meadows.

Ireland has large areas of fell meadows with grazing cattle.

On the American continent, Canada can present extensive fell meadows in Nova Scotia.

== See also ==
- Salt marsh
- Coastal meadow
- Flood-meadow
- Water-meadow
- Wet meadow
- Coastal prairie (disambiguation)

== Sources and literature ==
- Lorenz Ferdinand: "Fuglene i landskabet" (Større danske fuglelokaliteter Bind II; Dansk Ornitologisk Forening, København 1980; ISBN 87-87604-03-5 (in Danish)
- Peter Vestergaard: Beach Meadows - a protected nature-type Danish Ministry of Nature and the Environment (2000), ISBN 87-12-03554-8 (in Danish)
- Beach Meadows Danish Nature Agency (in Danish)
