= Roald =

Village in Giske Municipality, Norway

- Village
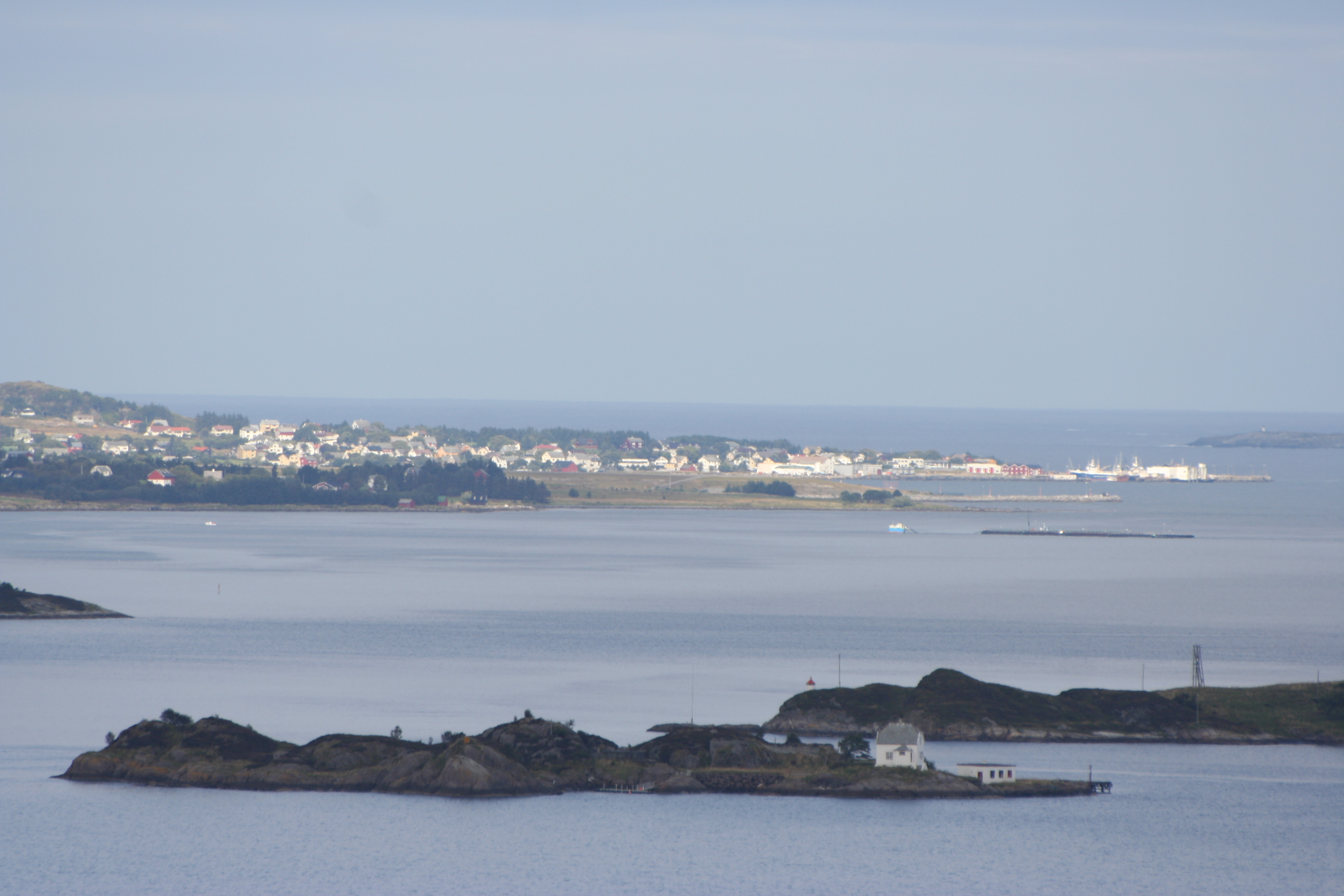
- View of Roald (in the background)
- Interactive map of Roald
- Location within Møre og Romsdal Location within Norway
- Coordinates: 62.5824°N 6.1247°E
- Country: Norway
- Region: Western Norway
- County: Møre og Romsdal
- District: Sunnmøre
- Municipality: Giske Municipality

Area
  - Total: 0.76 km^{2} (0.29 sq mi)
- Elevation: 4 m (13 ft)

Population (2024)
  - Total: 1,071
  - Density: 1,409/km^{2} (3,650/sq mi)
- Time zone: UTC+01:00 (CET)
  - Summer (DST): UTC+02:00 (CEST)
- Post Code: 6040 Vigra

Roald is a village in Giske Municipality in Møre og Romsdal county, Norway. The village is located on the northern part of the island Vigra. Roald is located about 20 kilometres (12 mi) north of the city centre of Ålesund. It is connected to the mainland via two undersea tunnels which opened in 1987 (and was extensively upgraded in 2008). Ålesund Airport, Vigra is located 2 kilometres (1.2 mi) south of the village of Roald. Vigra Church is also located a short distance south of Roald.

The 0.76-square-kilometre (190-acre) village has a population (2024) of 1,071 and a population density of 1,409 inhabitants per square kilometre (3,650/sq mi).

== History ==
The village of Roald was the administrative centre of the old Roald Municipality that existed from 1890 until its dissolution in 1964. The former municipality was later renamed Vigra Municipality. Since 1964, the area has been a part of Giske Municipality.
