= Vigra (island) =

Island in Møre og Romsdal, Norway

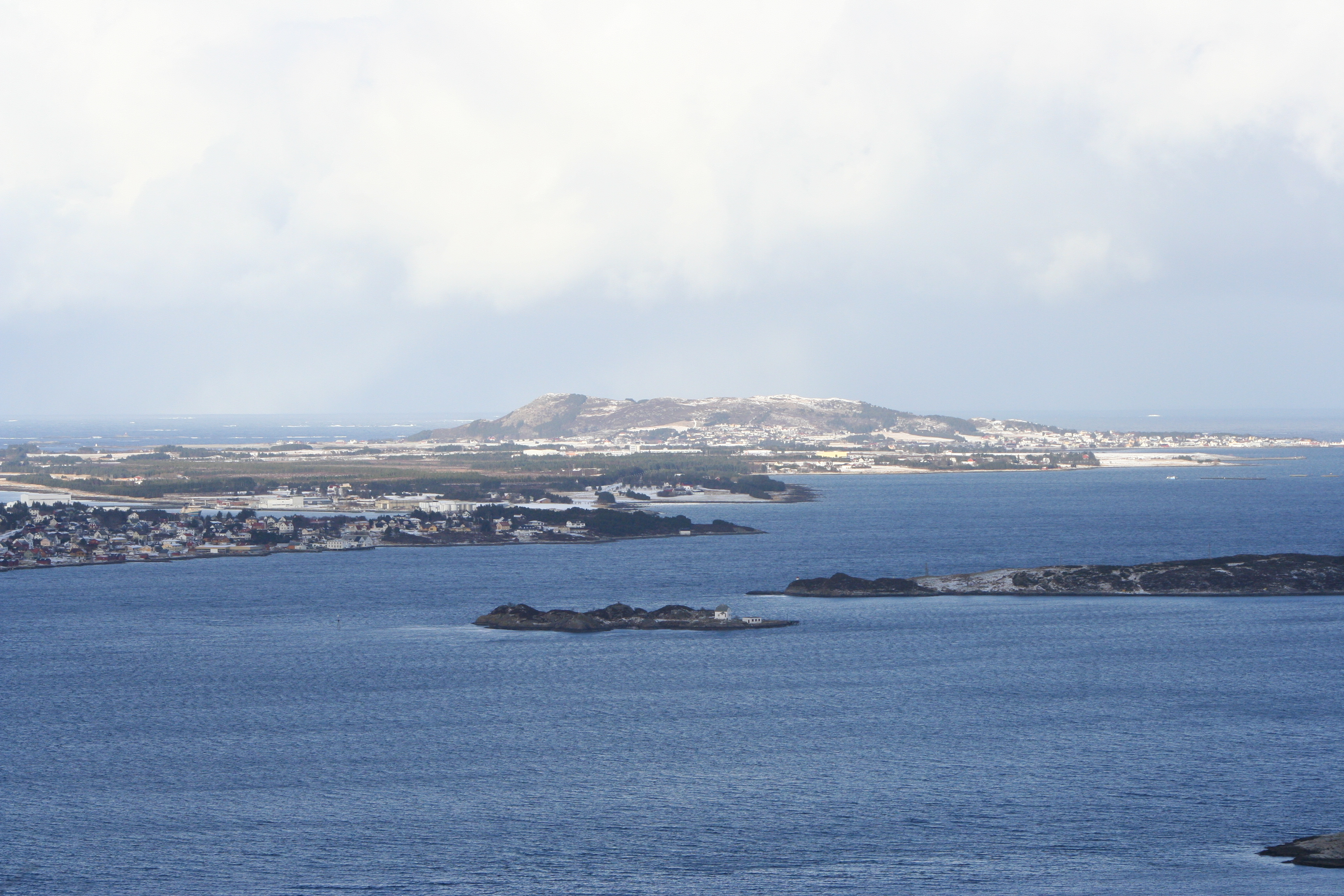
- View of the island
- Interactive map of Vigra

Geography
- Location: Møre og Romsdal, Norway
- Coordinates: 62.5579°N 6.0786°E
- Area: 20 km^{2} (7.7 sq mi)
- Length: 6 km (3.7 mi)
- Width: 7 km (4.3 mi)
- Highest elevation: 122 m (400 ft)
- Highest point: Molnesfjellet

Administration
- Norway
- County: Møre og Romsdal
- Municipality: Giske Municipality

Demographics
- Population: 2037 (2015)

Vigra is an island in Giske Municipality in Møre og Romsdal county, Norway. The 20-square-kilometre (7.7 sq mi) island is located north of the islands of Valderøya and Giske, west of the mainland of Haram Municipality, and southwest of the island of Lepsøya (in Haram). Vigra has a road connection to the mainland via the Vigra Fixed Link, a series of tunnels and bridges that connect all the islands of Giske Municipality to the city of Ålesund to the south. The island was formerly part of Vigra Municipality.

The island is fairly flat and barren, although most land has been converted to agricultural uses. The highest point is the 122-metre (400 ft) tall Molnesfjellet on the north end of the island. The largest population centre on the island is the village of Roald on the northern part of the island, on the southeastern edge of Molnesfjellet. Vigra Church is the only church on the island.

In 1988, five nature reserves were established on the island, including the Blindheimsvik Wildlife Sanctuary. Vigra has excellent walking trails along the seashore and over the hills. There are a number of beaches on Vigra including Blimsanden, Rørvikvågen, Blindheimsvika, Roald, and Molnes. Fishing is a popular activity on the island. Ålesund Airport is located on the island of Vigra. On 8 September 2011, the 77-year-old landmark Vigra transmitter, a medium wave broadcasting transmitter, was taken down.

== Climate ==
Vigra is situated at the coast and has a temperate oceanic climate (Cfb) with very mild winters for the latitude, sometimes with strong winds in winter and late autumn. All-time high is 30 °C (86 °F) recorded 28 July 2018, while the all-time low is −11.9 °C (10.6 °F) recorded January 2016. Winter lows rarely go below −8 °C (18 °F). Coldest month on record was February 1966 with mean −1.5 °C (29.3 °F), warmest month was August 2003 with mean 16.9 °C (62.4 °F). Ålesund Airport Vigra in Giske has been recording since July 1958.

Climate data for Ålesund Airport Vigra 1991-2020 (22 m)
Month	Jan	Feb	Mar	Apr	May	Jun	Jul	Aug	Sep	Oct	Nov	Dec	Year
Mean daily maximum °C (°F)	5.2 (41.4)	4.8 (40.6)	5.9 (42.6)	8.8 (47.8)	11.7 (53.1)	14.2 (57.6)	16.5 (61.7)	16.9 (62.4)	14.7 (58.5)	10.9 (51.6)	7.8 (46.0)	5.8 (42.4)	10.3 (50.5)
Daily mean °C (°F)	3.4 (38.1)	2.8 (37.0)	3.6 (38.5)	5.9 (42.6)	8.7 (47.7)	11.4 (52.5)	13.7 (56.7)	14.3 (57.7)	12.2 (54.0)	8.6 (47.5)	5.9 (42.6)	4 (39)	7.9 (46.2)
Mean daily minimum °C (°F)	1.3 (34.3)	0.7 (33.3)	1.3 (34.3)	3.3 (37.9)	6.1 (43.0)	9.1 (48.4)	11.5 (52.7)	12.1 (53.8)	9.8 (49.6)	6.3 (43.3)	3.8 (38.8)	1.8 (35.2)	5.6 (42.1)
Average precipitation mm (inches)	145.8 (5.74)	125.2 (4.93)	121.5 (4.78)	76.1 (3.00)	71.6 (2.82)	80.1 (3.15)	81.1 (3.19)	125.3 (4.93)	142.9 (5.63)	161.7 (6.37)	146.6 (5.77)	165.5 (6.52)	1,443.4 (56.83)
Average precipitation days (≥ 1.0 mm)	18	17	16	13	12	13	12	16	17	19	17	20	190
Source 1: yr.no
Source 2: NOAA - WMO averages 91-2020 Norway

== See also ==
- Notable people from the Giske Municipality
- List of islands of Norway
