= Upland pasture =

Type of grassland

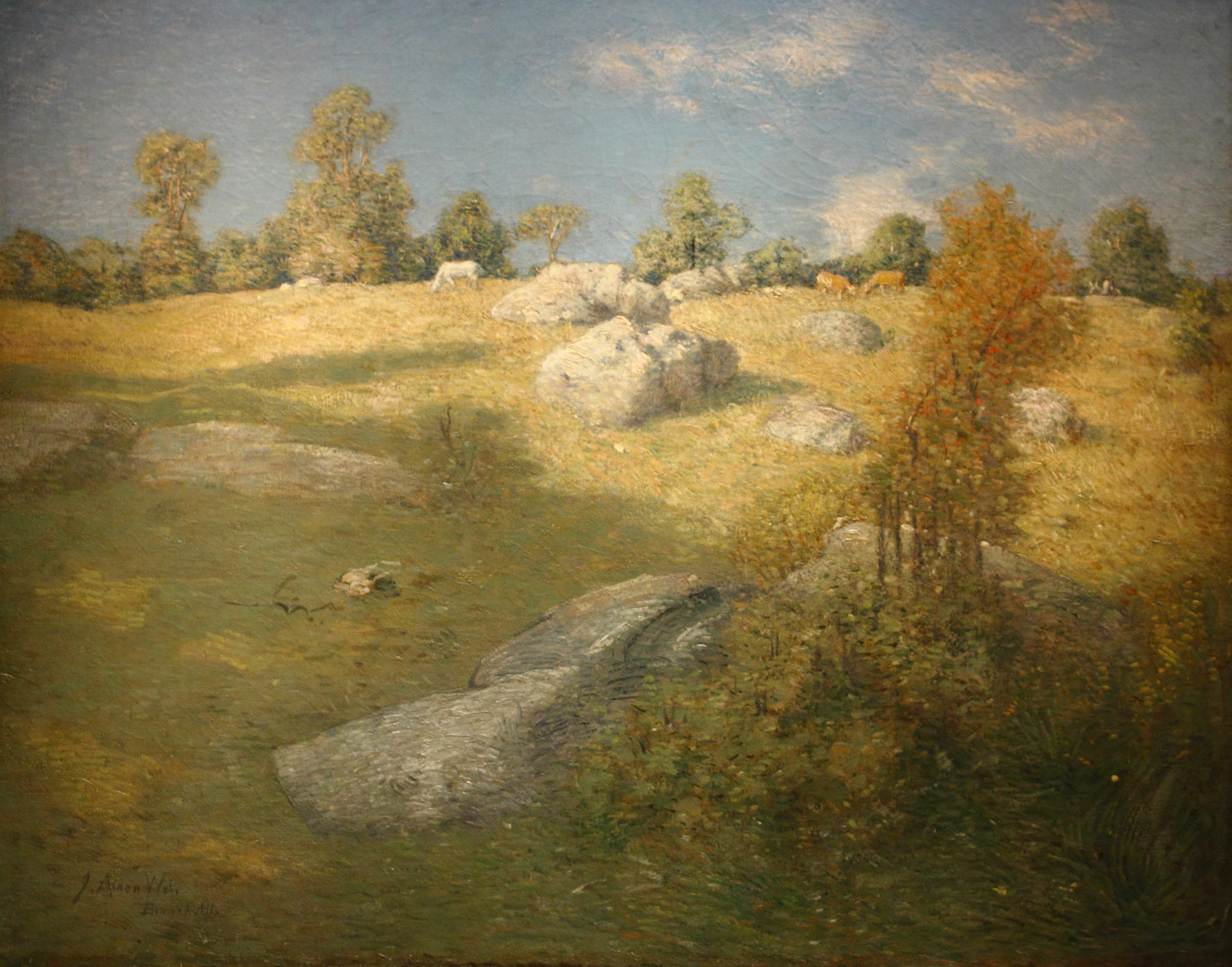
J. Alden Weir 1905 painting "Upland Pasture"

Upland pasture (rough grazing and/or semi-natural rough grazing) is a type of semi-natural grassland located in uplands of rolling foothills or upon higher slopes, greater than 350 meters (1148.29 feet) and less than 600 meters (1968.50 feet) from ground level, that is used primarily for grazing. Upland pastures occur in most grassland systems where topographic slope prevents feasible crop production; they are a primary component of rangelands, but are not necessarily water limited. Upland pastures include highlands, moorland, and other grasslands in regions of upland soils (said to have the potential for hydric inclusions, rather than definitive hydric inclusion; meaning there is potential for "saturation, flooding, or ponding long enough during the growing season to develop anaerobic conditions").

== Locations ==
The term originates in the British Isles where upland pastures constitute approximately 9 million hectares, 48% of agricultural land use in the UK. Upland pastures are widely managed in the United States in New England and Appalachia, and in semi-arid mountain regions in the inter-mountain west where their management is an important aspect of historic farming, wildlife preservation, and range livestock production. Upland pastures are also of primary importance to livestock production in western Australia, the Mongolian-Manchurian grassland ecoregion, in the Andes of Argentina, Uruguay, Paraguay, and western Brazil, in the Eurasian Steppes, in South Africa's Highveld, in Switzerland and the Alps, Sweden, Iceland, India, Juniper grasslands around Jabal Sawda in Saudi Arabia and other Juniper encroached grasslands in the Middle East including in Jordan, Israel, Turkey, Kazakhstan, as well as in eastern European nations, and, Tibet, New Zealand, Ethiopia, Canada, Kenya, Tanzania, Eritrea, Yemen, Ghana, Nigeria, Papua New Guinea, Syria, and Cantabria.

Pictures of upland pastures
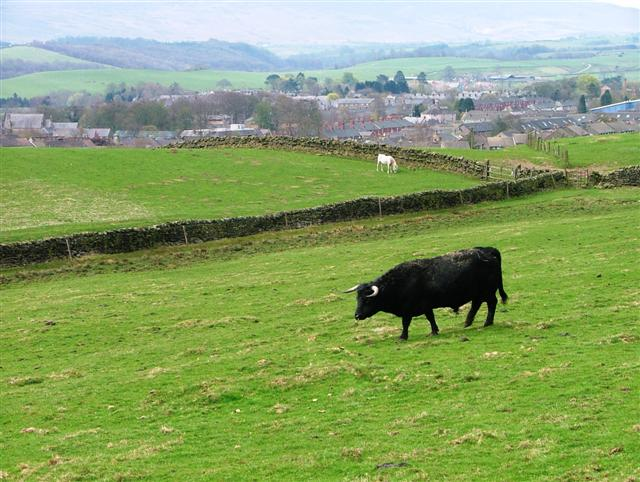
Black Scottish Highland bull in upland pasture overlooking Haltwhistle, UK

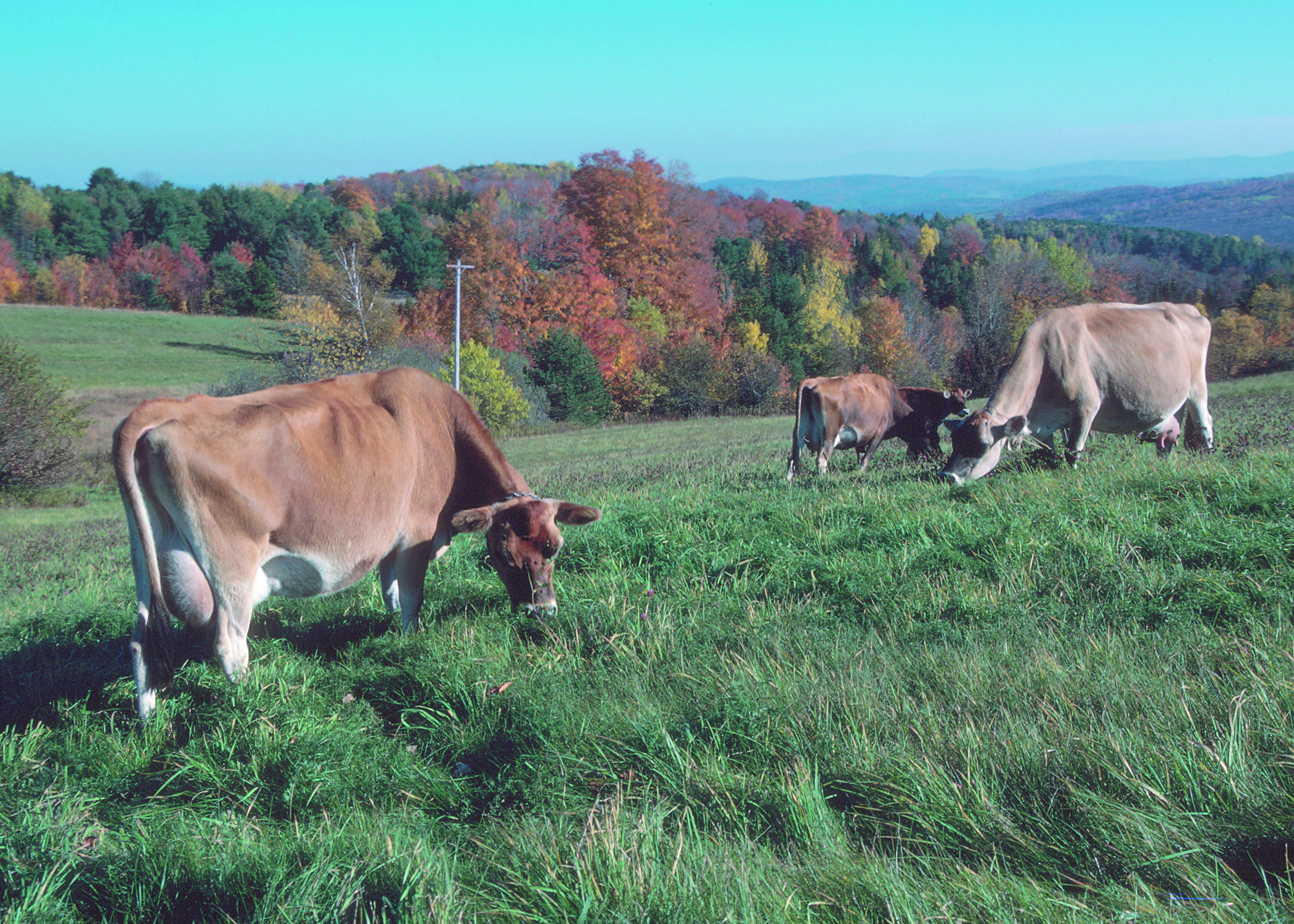
Jersey cattle grazing central Vermont, US upland pasture

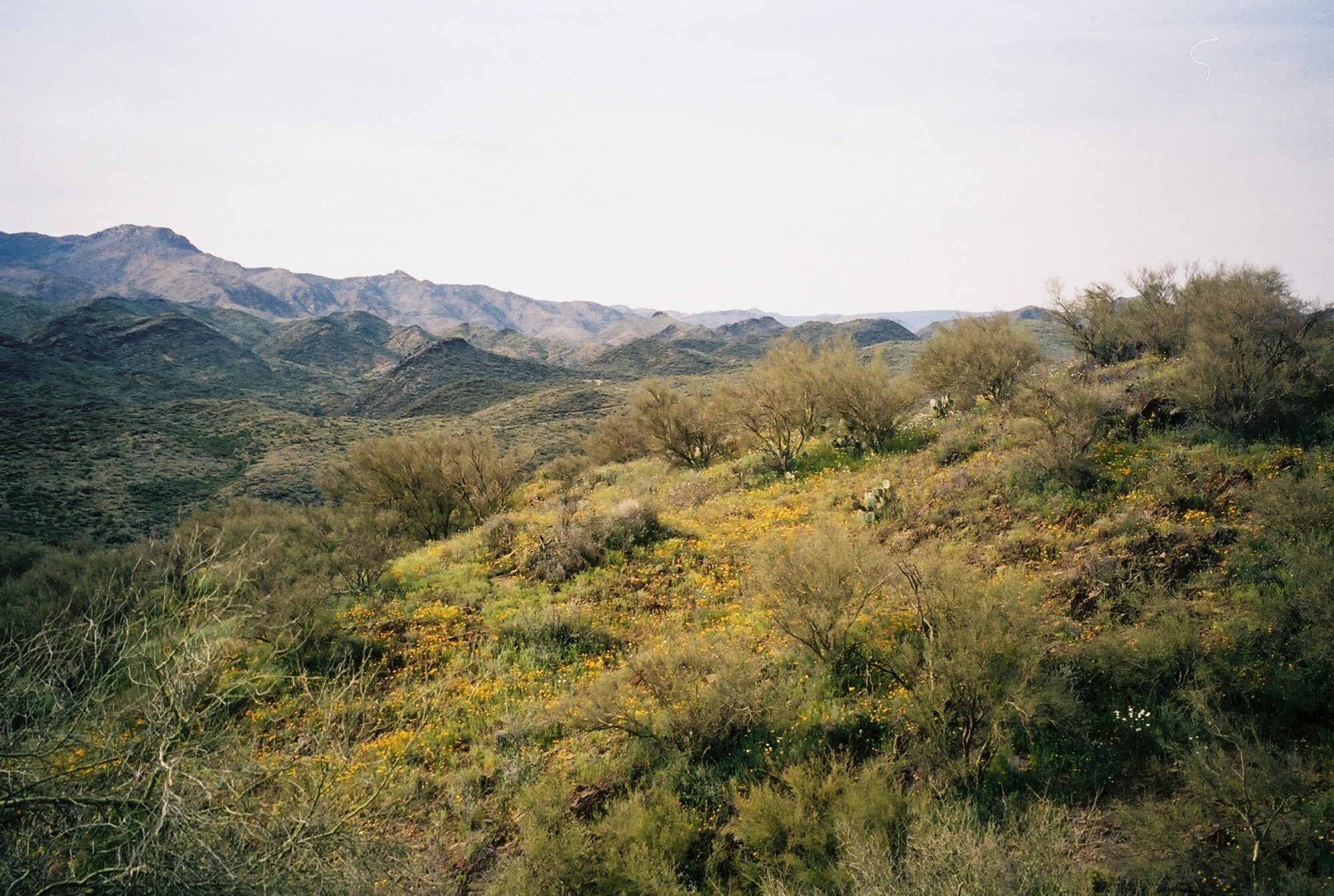
Highland shrubs in Agua Fria National Monument, Arizona, US

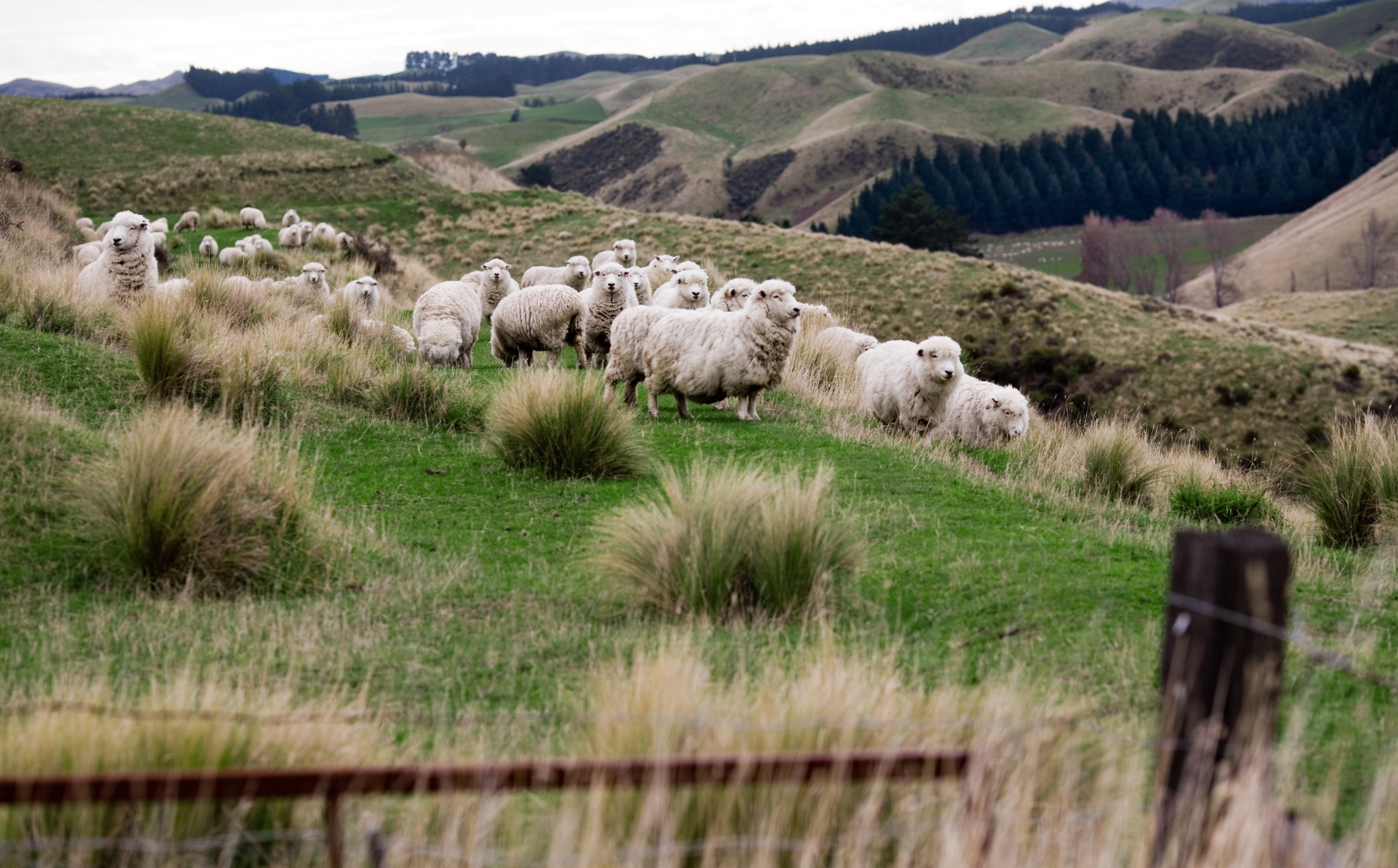
Sheep in New Zealand upland pasture

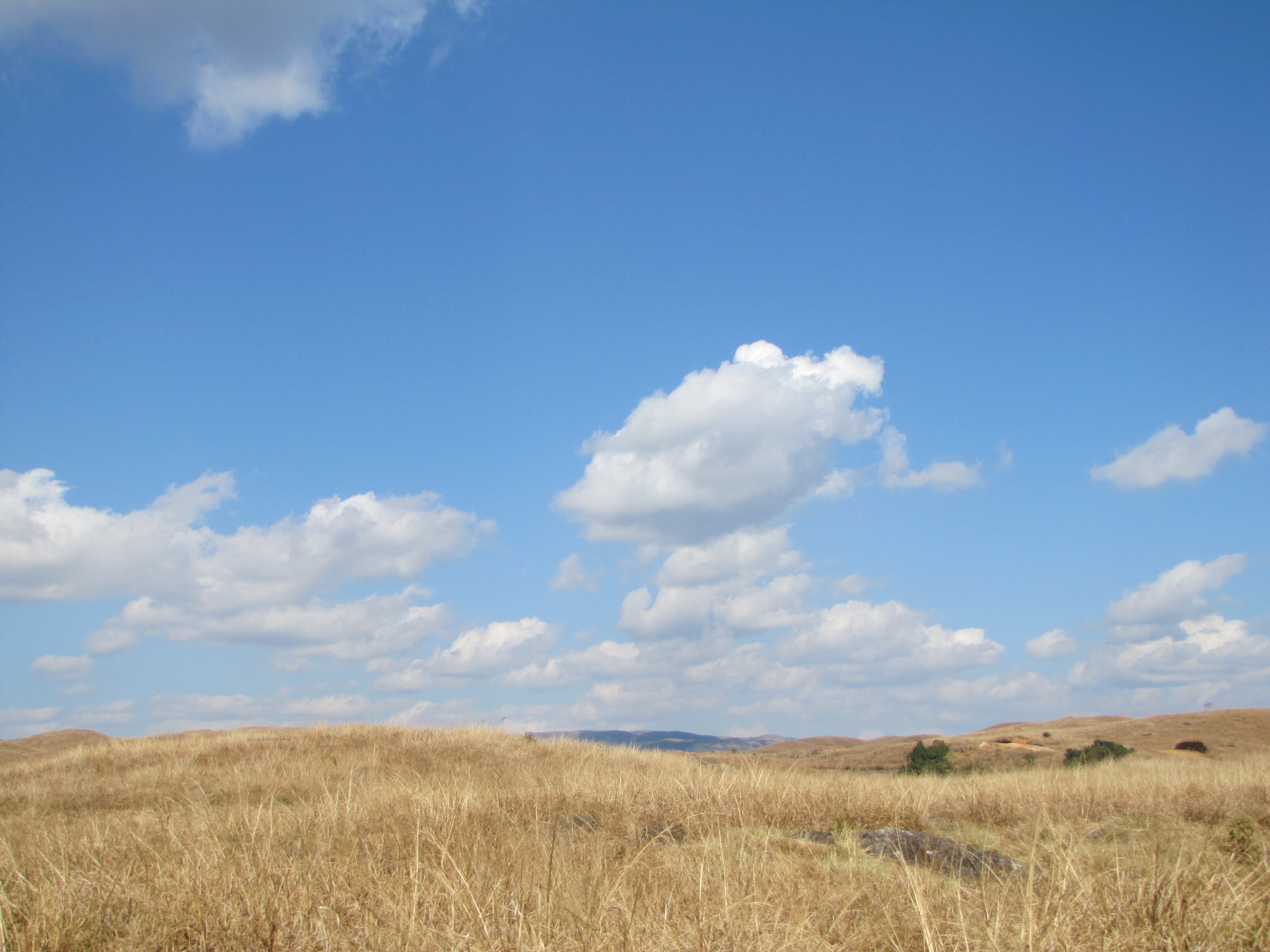
Shillong Eco Park upland pasture/ highlands in Meghalaya, India

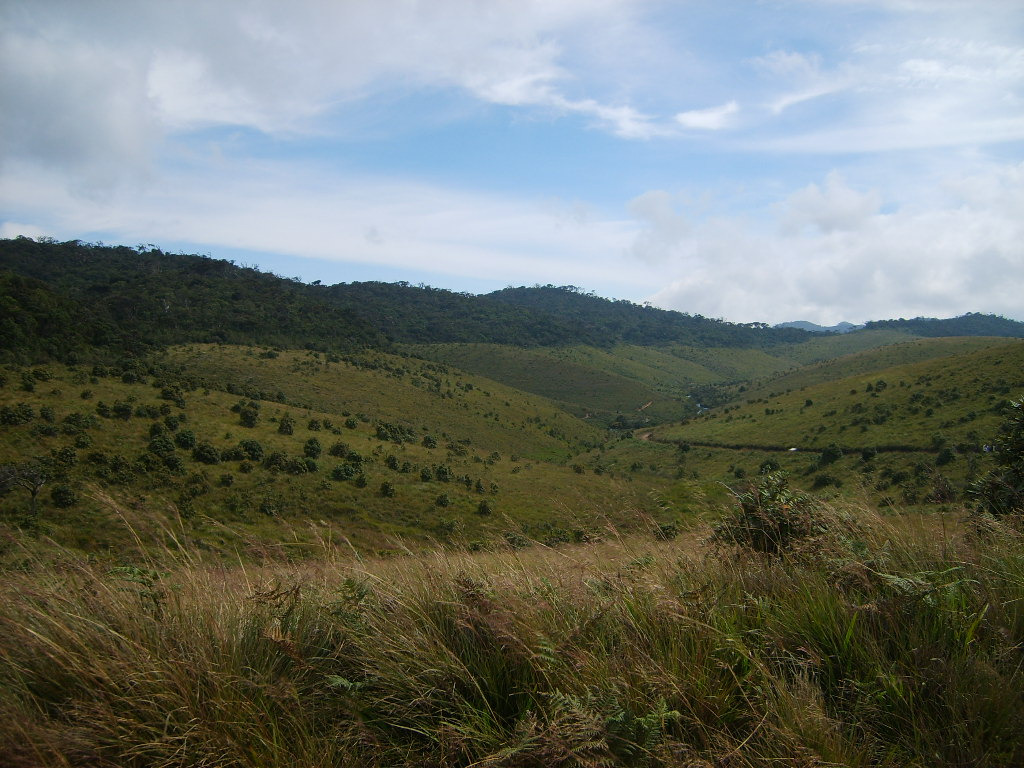
upland pasture in Horton Plains Valley, Horton Plains National Park in central highlands of Sri Lanka

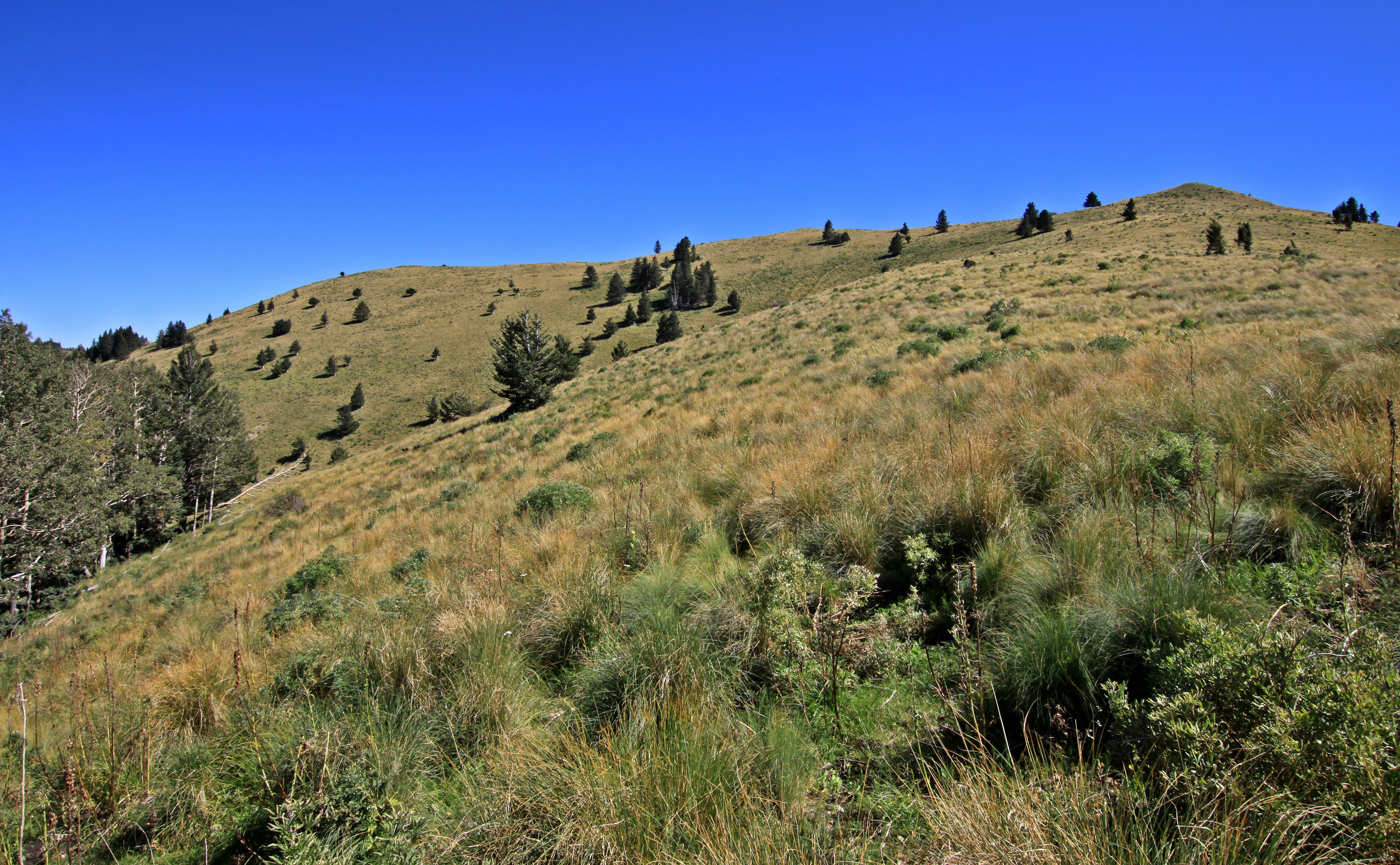
Upland pasture in Lincoln National Forest, southern New Mexico, US

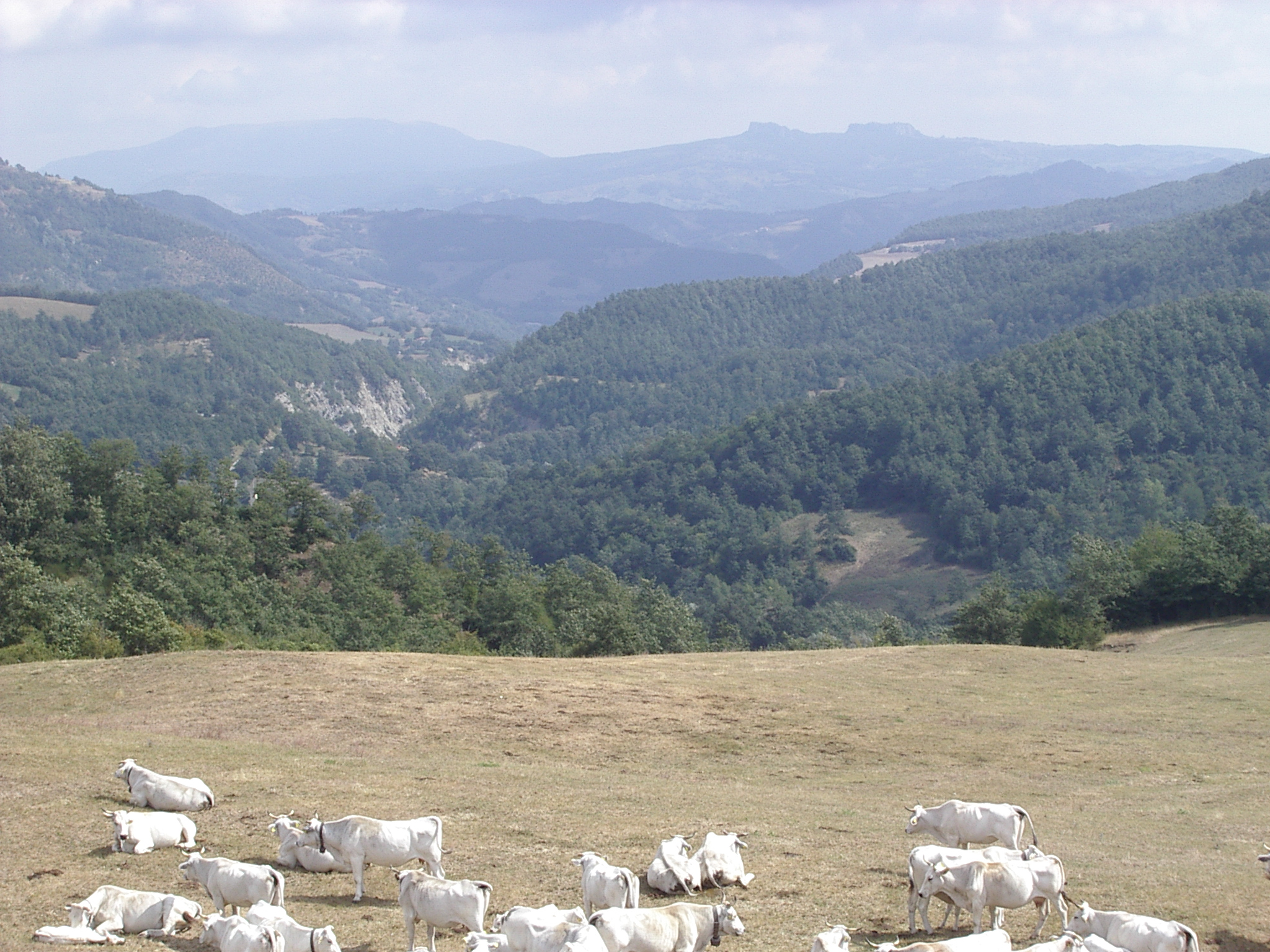
Chianina cattle in Valmarecchia, Italy upland pasture

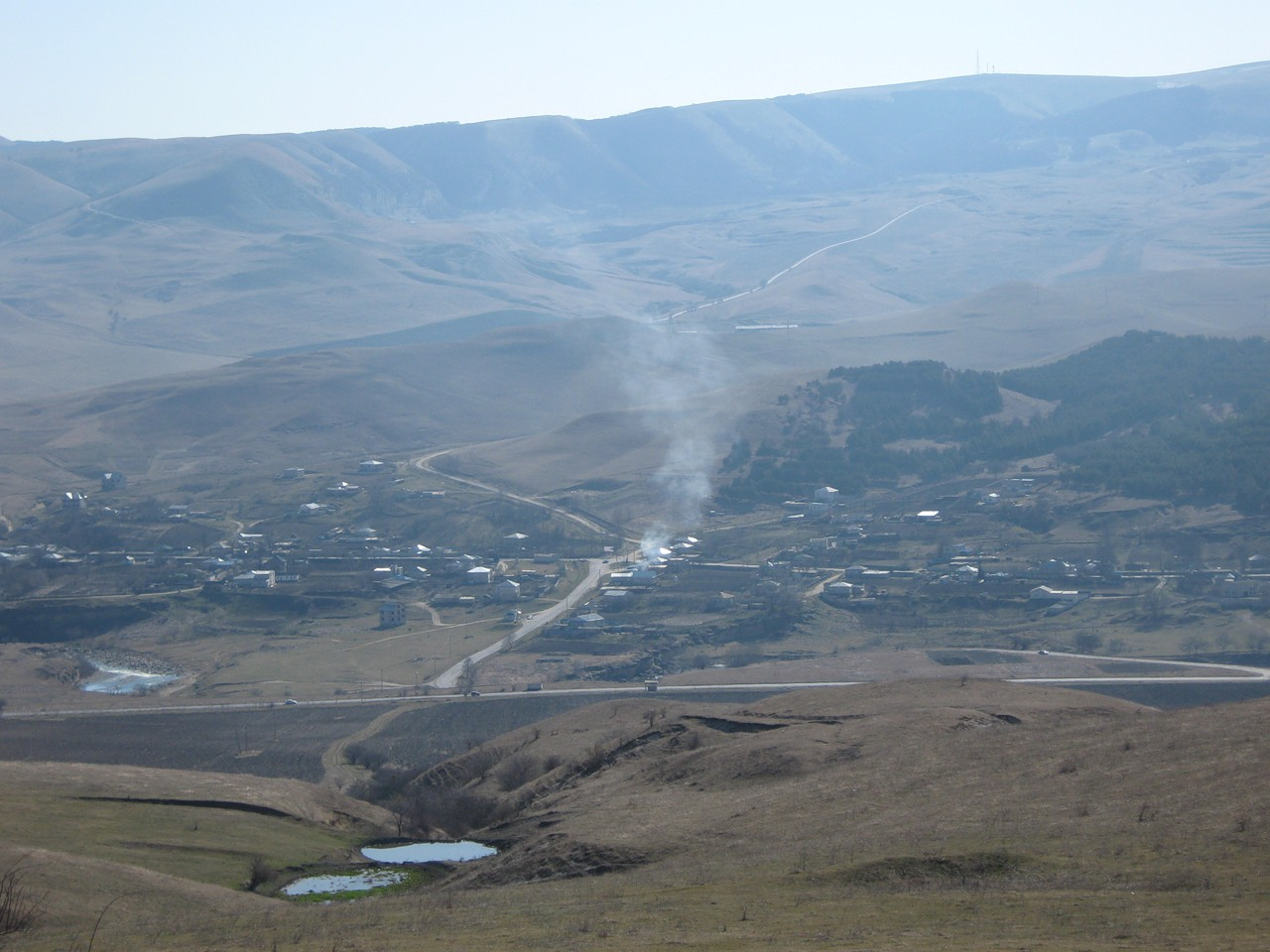
Mountain pastures outside the aul of El'burgan in Karachay-Cherkessia's Abazinsky District, Russia

== See also ==
- Upland (mountain range)
- Hill farming
- Upland game bird
- Pasture
- Fell
- Alpine pasture
- Lowland semi-natural grassland
