= Grazing land =

Grazing land may refer to:

- For grazing of livestock:
  - Pasture
  - Rangeland

== See also ==
- Where wild herbivores graze:
  - Grassland
  - Savanna
  - Steppe
