= Hill farming =

Type of agriculture in upland areas

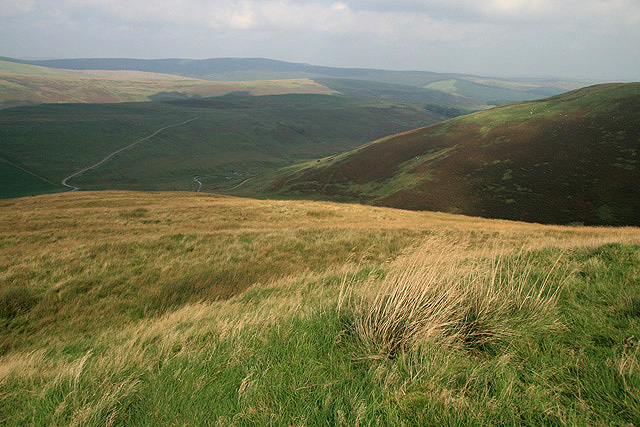
An example of hill farming countryside in the UK

Hill farming or terrace farming is an extensive farming in upland areas, primarily rearing sheep, although historically cattle were often reared extensively in upland areas. Fell farming is the farming of fells, a fell being an area of uncultivated high ground used as common grazing. It is a term commonly used in Northern England, especially in the Lake District and the Pennine Dales. Elsewhere, the terms hill farming or pastoral farming are more commonly used.

Cattle farming in the hills is usually restricted by a scarcity of winter fodder, and hill sheep, grazing at about two hectares per head, are often taken to lowland areas for fattening.

Modern hill farming is often heavily dependent on state subsidy, for example in the United Kingdom it received support from the European Union's Common Agricultural Policy. Improved, sown pasture and drained moorland can be stocked more heavily, at approximately one sheep per 0.26 hectares.

== Location and organization ==
Relief map of the United Kingdom

Hill farming is a type of agricultural practice in the UK in upland regions. In England, hill farms are located mainly in the North and South-Western regions, as well as a few areas bordering Wales. The Scottish highlands are another home for many hill farms. Sheep farms and mixed sheep and cattle farms constitute approximately 55% of the agricultural land in Scotland. These areas have a harsh climate, short growing seasons, relatively poor quality of soil and long winters. Therefore, these areas are considered to be disadvantaged and the animals raised there are generally less productive and farmers will often send them down to the lowlands to be fattened up.

Upland areas are not traditionally favourable for agricultural practices. The majority of Hill farming land in England is classified as Less Favoured Area (LFA), and the LFA constitutes 17% of land farmed in England. The LFA is further divided into Severely Disadvantaged Areas (SDAs) and Disadvantaged Areas (DAs), which make up 67% and 33% of the LFA respectively. These areas are classified as such on account of poor climate, soils, and terrain which cause higher costs in production and transportation as well as lower yields and less productivity. The LFA is significant in England's farming on a whole despite these disadvantages: 30% of beef cows and 44% of breeding sheep come from LFAs. Farming distinctively shapes the ecosystems of these zones, and the agriculture practices in the uplands define and shape the environment and landscape.

Upland areas are usually covered with both dry and wet dwarf shrub heath and, rough and either managed or unmanaged improved grasslands. The typical hill farm is made up of three distinct zones: the High fell, the Alotment, and the Inbye. The High fell includes peat moors and rocky areas which provide poor grazing at the top. The Alotment follows below, an enclosed area with rough grazing. The Inbye is the lowest area at the bottom, which is used as the regular grazing area as well as for growing hay.

== History ==
Dartmoor National Park has over 10,000ha of prehistoric field systems, dating back to 1500BC. Archaeological evidence shows that these moors have been grazed for 3500 years. Because of the extent of historical farming in the UK uplands, hill farming has shaped the English uplands both environmentally and culturally.

The UK government has designated different areas in the upland as specifically valuable by certain terms of the environment, biodiversity, archaeology, cultural heritage and landscape, and seeks to protect these regions for such reasons. According to the UK government, these designated areas and their qualifications as such are:

- National parks
  - "These protect and conserve the character of landscapes, facilities for access, wildlife habitats and historic features"
- Areas of outstanding natural beauty
  - "These conserve and enhance naturally beautiful landscapes"
- Countryside character areas
  - "Areas of cultural heritage which should be preserved"
- Natural England natural areas
  - "Each area has a unique identity created by its mix of natural features and human activities and provides a broad context for local nature conservation work"
- Common land
  - "Areas where people who do not own the land have rights to use it for farming or other purposes"
- National nature reserves
  - "These protect and provide public access to important wildlife and geological sites"
- Special areas of conservation
  - "These protect various wild animals, plants and habitats under the European Union’s Habitats Directive"
- Special protection areas
  - "These protect rare and vulnerable birds and migratory species as well as geological and physiographical heritage"
- Upland experiment areas
  - "Two upland areas where Natural England/Defra predecessor bodies piloted an integrated approach to rural development and nature conservation between 1999 and 2001"
- Ancient woodland
  - "Land that has had continuous tree cover since at least 1600"

Over the past century, Hill farming and the upland environment have undergone a number of changes. Since 1900 there has been:

- An approximately 500% increase in the number of sheep livestock.
- A decrease in medium-sized farms, due to increase in large farms businesses and the emergence of small-scale hobby farmers.
- Increased specialization in livestock and a movement away from tradition mixed farming methods.
- Fairly consistent labour employment on account of constant agricultural intensification offsetting reductions in labour output made possible by technological advancements.
- A high turnover rates in upland ecosystem habitat types. For example, although the percentage of land classified as dwarf shrub moor remained relatively stable between 1913 and 2000, only 55% of the dwarf moor shrub land in 1913 occupied the same area as it does in 2000.

== Uplands ecosystems ==
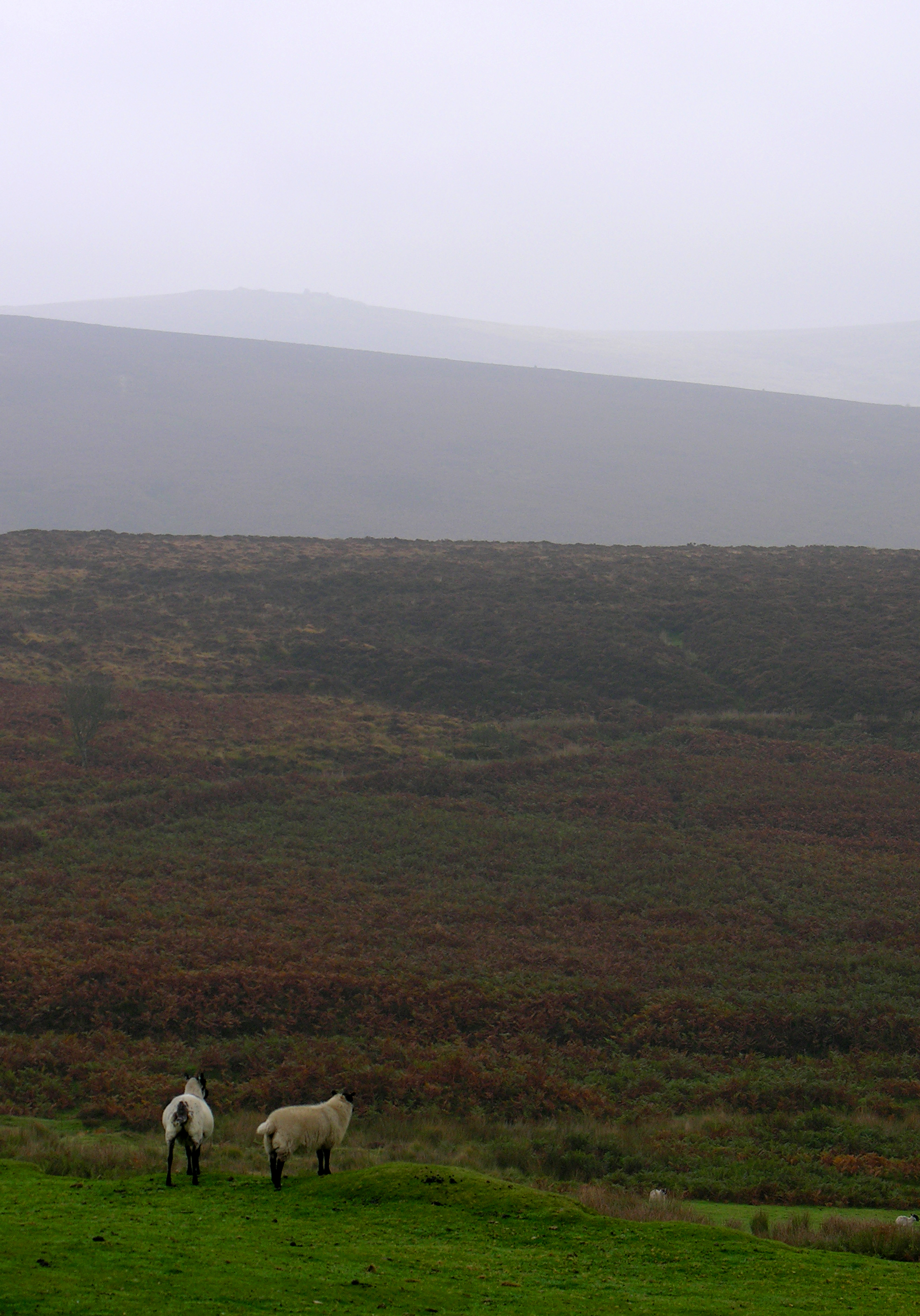
The Dartmoor sheep is a type of livestock found on hill farms.

A large number of upland ecosystems have been shaped by humans for centuries, particularly by farming and agriculture. Because of this, many upland ecosystems have become dependent on hill farm land management. Hill farming practices play a significant role in supporting surrounding flora and fauna in the uplands. Through grazing, sheep and cattle maintain a variety of tall grasses and short vegetation. This in turn supports local wildlife, as the short vegetation provides breeding and nesting grounds for many species of waders, including the lapwing, redshank, and golden plover. The taller grasses are an important part of the Curlew habitat, which is another species of wader. Cattle dung provides nutrition for many species of insects and carrion provides food for various species of scavenging birds.

During winter farmers will usually keep the animals indoors, supplementing the livestock's diet with hay or silage. The land used to grow winter feed that are not mowed are able to provide protection for a variety of birds including skylarks, partridge, and corncrakes who build on their nests on the ground. Agricultural use, burning, and grazing by both livestock and wild life such as deer, helps to sustain the upland grasslands, moorland and bogs. If these ecosystems were not maintained they would be colonized by trees and scrub.

Sustainable careful maintenance is important in hill farming in order to protect the delicate relationship that farm manage has on the biodiversity of native plant and animal species.

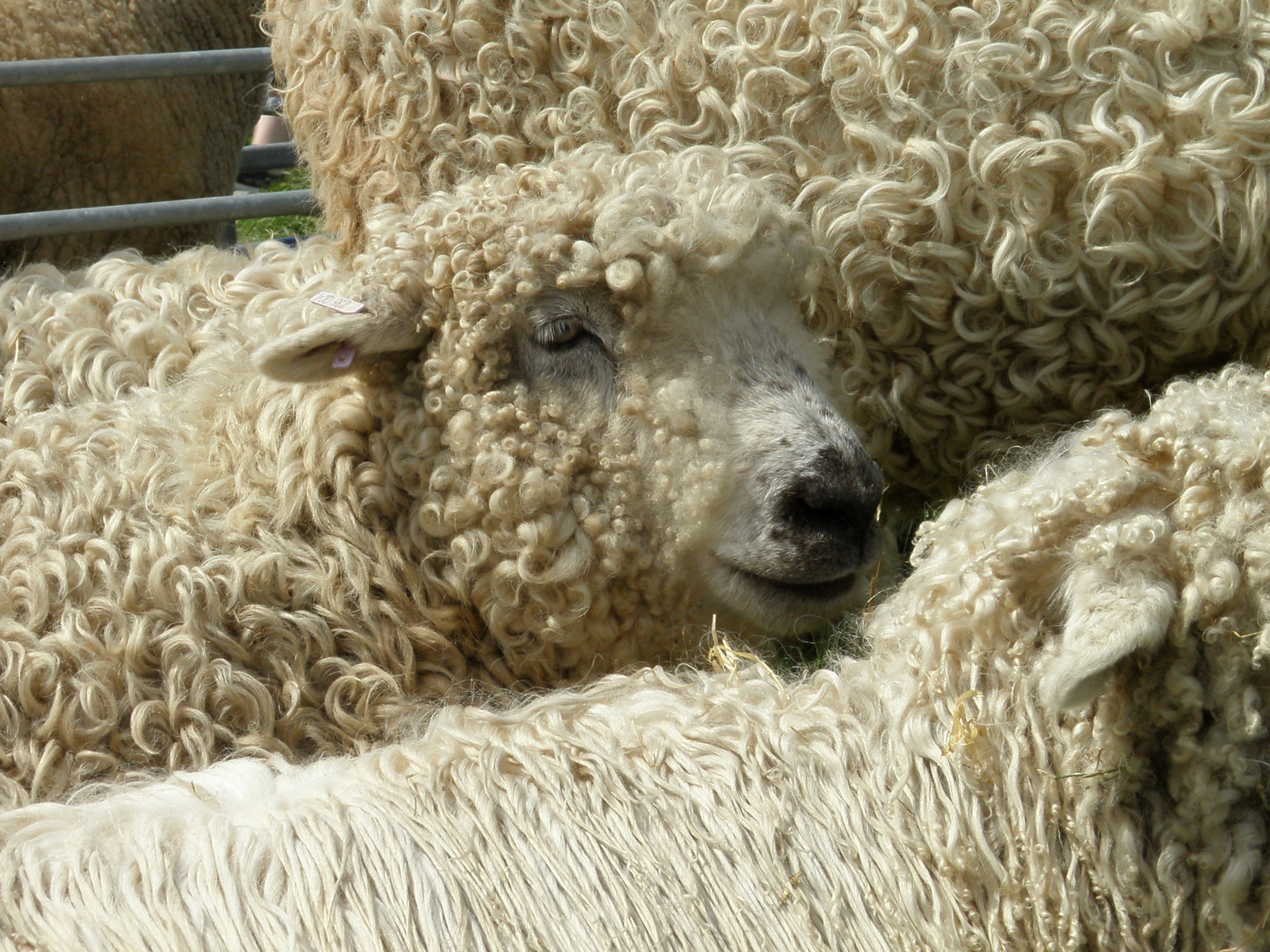
A Grey Faced Dartmoor sheep

Upland ecosystems have seen a shift in the last century, associated with widespread habitat deterioration caused by human actions and exploitation. The decline in grazing animals accompanied with the milder winters experienced in recent years has caused an overgrowth in vegetation, putting the ecosystem, as well as various archaeological sites at risk. The Dartmoor Vision initiative is trying to return Dartmoor to its former predominantly cattle, sheep, and pony grazed landscape.

== Government support and subsidies ==
Hill farm incomes in the UK have recently seen great decrease following drops in lamb and beef prices. Therefore, subsidy support has become vital for Hill farm survival, and the policies have been changing in response to continuous uncertainty in the sector.

=== Common Agricultural Policy (CAP) ===
Hill farming has been supported by both the British government and EU policies, one of the most influential EU scheme being The Common Agricultural Policy (CAP). The CAP provided production-based direct (headage) which gave incentive to stock beef cattle and sheep at high densities. This led to, in some circumstances, overgrazing which damages natural and semi-natural vegetation. Because of overgrazing and issues with the accumulation of surpluses, the CAP was reformed. The two most recent reforms to the CAP were Agenda 2000 in 1999 and the Mid Term Review of June 2003 and April 2004. These changes are phasing out support and protections linked to production, and are providing more support on environmental and rural developments.

=== Single Farm Payment ===
The Single Farm Payment replaced the older headage payments (CAP) in 2005. Analyses of the effects of economic incentives provided to hill farmers by decoupling and the introduction of the Single Farm Payment show that although these policies cause little change in average farm incomes they do encourage change in the way hill farms run. Specifically the policies promote the reduction of stocking densities, reduction of employment of additional farm labour, movement away from reliance on beef cattle, increased specialization, and to keep farming land in “good agricultural condition” rather than farm abandonment. The EU plans to phase out and progressively reduce the SFP, and the SFP is guaranteed until 2013.

=== Other policies ===
Other subsidy schemes from the British government are available to hill farmers, particularly the Uplands Entry Level Stewardship (Uplands ELS) and agri-environment schemes. The Uplands ELS replaced the prior Hill Farm Allowance in 2010. Before the HFA, hill farms we subsidized by the Hill Livestock Compensatory Allowances which were active as headage support to eligible beef cows and ewes. Because the DAs are more profitable than the SDAs, active since 2008 DAs became ineligible for funding from the Hill Farming Allowance (HFA).

In addition to the Upland ELS, hill farmers in England's SDAs are supported by the Single Payment Scheme (SPS), which is the primary agricultural subsidy scheme under the EU. Subsidies from the SPS are not dependent on production, granting greater freedom to farmers to meet market demands. The SPS also claims to specifically support hill farmers who follow environmentally friendly farming practices.

In order to receive these subsidies, hill farmers must meet cross compliance rules and regulations, which mainly involves avoidance of overgrazing and unsuitable supplementary feeding on natural and semi-natural vegetation under GAEC (standard of good agricultural and environmental condition). These standards were implemented to protect significant habitats and to limit soil erosion and other negative effects of soil structure in the uplands.

Certain upland farmers and communities also have access to funding from the Rural Development Programme for England (RDPE) team at Defra. The reduction of farming subsidies that have taken place over the past few decades has created an uncertain future for farming in many parts of Europe.

== Recent strain on hill farming ==
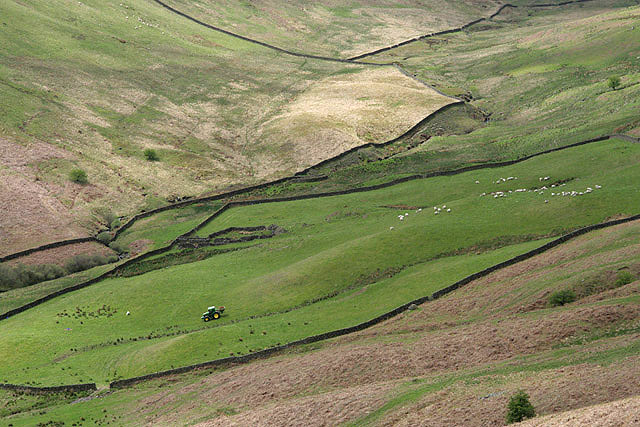
Hill farming countryside by the Arkland Burn

Without government subsidies, many hill farms would have a negative income. The high cost of land and machinery keeps many hill farmers from expanding. Hill farmers in some parts of England have reported a 75% decrease in income over the past decade.

Hill farmer income is subject to large fluctuation above the influence of the farmers. The harsh terrain and climate of hill farms are hard on the animals, causing them to be relatively very unproductive. Because of this, hill farming can have economic strains on the farmers who generally have low income. Wet weather, as often experienced in the uplands, create additional animal feed costs for farmers.

Many hill farmers earn around £12,600, with some earning as little as £8,000. This is much below the annual £19,820 a single working adult requires to live in a village in England. In 2008, a farmer would receive a profit of £1 for a single moorland lamb. The average LFA farm in England only earns about 66% of their total revenue from farming. 22% of this revenue comes from the Single Farm Payment, and 10% from specific agri-environment payments. The 2% balance originated from non-farm activities, which are usually associated with contracting or tourism and recreation.

Hill farmers in Peak District National Park (PDNP) constitute one of UK's most deprived farming communities, with farms in the LFA making an average loss of £16,000 per farm, generating an average headline Farm Business Income of £10,800 (supplemented by various government subsidies), creating a net income average per farm of about £6000.

The hill farming sector in southwest England, like farming in the rest of the country, has experienced a decade of much change associated with economic pressures and uncertainties. On average, the financial position of hill farms in South West England, like the rest of the country, is precarious. The average southwest English hill farm system in unable to match labour and capital invest in the business.

Many farmers rely on a Single Farm Payment as a source of income. These payments are expected to arrive in November or December, but sometimes farmers do not receive the money until June. Due to this farmers are often unable to pay their bills or fix their machinery. Some farmers have to cut back on the feed given to their animals, leading to a decrease in meat production and therefore lower profit. By 2012 the Single Payment Scheme (or SPS), will only take into consideration the area of the farm. This will decrease the income in moorland farmers to only 70% of what it was 20 years ago.

The income from calves and lambs has remained constant, while the costs of farm upkeep have risen sharply (including items such as feed, straw, fuel, or fertilizer). Because hill farming is becoming increasingly less profitable an increasing number of farmers have switched from the traditional hearty but less profitable animals which graze the moors to mainstream more profitable animals.

Opportunities for farmers to supplement their farm income by working in industries such as quarrying or mining are largely no longer available. The financial burden has taken a toll on many hill farmers, causing them to exhibit signs of mental health issues. Many hill farmers are forced to generate supplemental income outside their farms or to take out loans. Because of these economic factors, there is little incentive for younger generations to continue on with the hill farming.

== Problems ==
As discussed in an article on the Carnegie UK Trust Rural Community Development Programme site:

The Foot and Mouth outbreak in Cumbria in 2001 led to the culling of over a million sheep. It also showed that the hill (fell) farming communities were as vulnerable as the pastoral system they have created over many generations.

== See also ==
- Environmental philosophy
- Hill Farming Act 1946
- Pastoral farming
- Sheepdog trials
