= Range condition scoring =

Measurement of biodiversity

Range Condition Scoring was developed as a way to quantify biodiversity in a given rangeland system. This practice is widely used in the Sand Hills region of Nebraska, as well as the tallgrass prairie regions, as evidenced by the authoritative book on the subject, "Range Judging Handbook and Contest Guide for Nebraska." This book outlines the steps required to evaluate, or score, a particular region of rangeland; and it serves as a baseline for the understanding of this method of judging rangeland health.

== Completing a survey ==
A certain area of land is chosen for a survey and random selections are made to determine where species composition measurements must be taken. Once these areas are selected, plant species composition measurements are taken by clipping the plants in a cordoned off area and measuring the mass of each type of plant species. This can then be compared to the entire plant mass in the area to determine the percent of each species located within the area.

Once these percentages are determined, they can be compared with the "Guides for determining range condition" located in the Range Judging Handbook. These tables show the amount of each species that is allowed in each area of rangeland. The tables differ depending upon average rainfall as well as soil type. These differences occur because the climax plant community would differ as the variables of rainfall and soil type change.

The score that is computed will fall in the range of 0-25% if the range is in "Poor" Condition, 26-50% if the range is in "Fair" Condition, 51-75% if the range is in "Good" Condition, and 76-100% if the range is in "Excellent" Condition.

By taking the range condition score that is determined, the researcher then can use Table 4 in the Nebraska Cooperative Extension Circular EC 86-113-C to determine an "Adjustment Factor for Initial Stocking Rate." This adjustment factor is then multiplied by the correct number found in Table 3 of the same Extension Circular to determine an initial stocking rate value for livestock. This stocking rate is expressed in units called AUM/acre (Animal Unit Months per acre). AUMs are based on the amount of forage that a 1000-pound animal will graze in one month's time, which is roughly 780 pounds of air-dry forage. This information is further detailed in the "Nebraska Handbook of Range Management".

By connecting the research completed involving quantifying rangeland health to the research completed involving livestock grazing and distribution, we now have a system in place to more properly manage stocking rates of grazing livestock. In addition, we have a system that determines the amount of forage that should not be grazed to provide adequate support for wildlife biodiversity. This use, as well as others, is detailed below.

== Uses ==
=== Management tool ===
For livestock ranchers, landowners, wildlife conservationists, business owners of fee hunting enterprises and many others, that range condition score of certain tracts of rangeland can prove very valuable. The reasons for this include either valuation of rangeland or for impacts regarding changes in management of rangeland. When management practices are put in place to improve biodiversity and overall range health, this method of range condition scoring is one way of monitoring the improvements (or lack thereof). One example of the value of range condition scoring as a management tool can be seen in Leonard Sisson's research entitled "Recommendations for Management of Sharp-Tailed Grouse in the Nebraska Sand Hills." In this work, he correlates the rise in range condition scores of rangeland to the increase in population of Sharp-tailed grouse.

=== Inclusion in leases ===
Other uses for range condition scores involve inclusion in leases that specify a certain level of range condition must be maintained. This may involve clauses which force the landowner to remove cattle from a certain area of leased range once a specified decrease in range condition score has occurred. For instance, when grazing pressure has increased, certain undesirable plants that do not contribute to a high range condition score (such as annual plants or non-natives) may increase. When this occurs, grazing rights must be relinquished to allow for adequate rest of the plant community. This should stimulate the lessee to maintain good grazing management to make his livestock grazing patterns more sustainable.

=== Stocking rates ===
Other uses for range condition scoring include making adjustments to stocking rate of grazing livestock as the range condition score changes in a certain pasture. This is evident when annual changes in precipitation have an effect on rangeland health. When a producer can determine the estimated forage available before the grazing season begins, this will allow the producer to be more flexible in his grazing management decisions. In EC 91–123, Reece et al. show how specific grazing management techniques may be used on order to more effectively mitigate drought and other precipitation changes on rangeland.

An owner of a fee-hunting enterprise would be able to determine suitability for hunting certain species of game animals because research has shown that wildlife populations and overall biodiversity increase as the Range Condition Score increases. Biodiversity increases are most apparent because Range Condition Scoring is a direct measure of plant population biodiversity relative to the climax plant community. However, animal biodiversity is tougher to correlate, but is done so by Sisson in the previously cited work.

A producer is able to use stocking rate data to more efficiently and evenly distribute grazing livestock in areas of rangeland. By determining the costs of cross-fencing a certain pasture, for example, the producer would compute the materials and labor needed to complete the task. By determining the benefits, he would determine the increase in harvest efficiency of the rangeland by more evenly distributing the livestock by moving the herd from one smaller pasture to another rather than continuously grazing the herd in one larger pasture. By cross-fencing and rotationally grazing, the livestock producer may be able to decrease or eliminate harmful effects of his operation on the rangeland, and also increase his productivity be being able to increase his herd size. This process is detailed in numerous grazing management research papers, one of which is by Waller, S., et al. and is titled "Understanding Grass Growth: the Key to Profitable Livestock Production."

== Moving forward ==
There has been a shift in thought regarding grassland ecology as a new theory of "stable state ecology" has been proposed by van Andel and Grootjans (2006). This may serve as an alternative to the Range Condition Scoring method in terms of management towards climax plant communities.

== Holistic Resource Management ==
Holistic Resource Management, an acronym commonly mistaken for "Holistic Ranch Management," is a system of resource management which emphasizes decision making for the long-term. This is a concept identified by Allan Savory, the famed Zimbabwean biologist, rancher, and environmentalist. This concept focuses on healing damaged land, while increasing productivity and sustainability. Range Condition Scoring is an important factor in this process as it serves as a quantifier. Even though qualitative evidence like "the range looks better" or "it looks like there is better ground cover" or "the grass seems more resilient to drought than in the 1930s because of the way ranchers manage things today," it is important that we use quantitative evidence rather than qualitative.

A number of concepts and principles may be in place to solve rangeland health and degradation issues, but none of them are possible if monitoring and quantitative evidence are not present. Savory also developed the Savory brittleness scale which reflects the distribution of humidity throughout the year and how well the land can recover if left after being cleared.

== Sources ==
- Anderson, Bruce; Trammell, Mike; Klopfenstein, Terry. 1997 Beef Cattle Report: Continuous vs. Rotational Stocking of Warm-Season Grasses at Three Stocking Rates. UNL MP 67-A. https://web.archive.org/web/20100625191255/http://beef.unl.edu/beefreports/199712.shtml
- Barnes, Miller, Nelson. 1995. "Forages". Volume I. An introduction to grassland agriculture. Volume II. The science of grassland agriculture. ISU Press. 5th ed.
- Brink, D.; Schacht, W. Livestock Management on Range and Pasture.
- Dunn, Barry H.; Etheredge, Matthew. Range Beef Cow Symposium XIX: Key Indicators of Success in Ranching: A Balanced Approach. 2005. https://web.archive.org/web/20100725205101/http://beef.unl.edu/beefreports/symp-2005-21-XIX.shtml
- Nichols, James T.; Jensen, Peter N. Range Judging Handbook and Contest Guide for Nebraska. EC 150. 2006 UNL.
- Reece, P.E., J.D. Alexander, J.R. Johnson. 1991. Drought management on range and pastureland. EC91-123.
- Savory, Allan R.; Jody Butterfield. 1988. Holistic Management: A New Framework for Decision Making, 2nd ed. (in English), Washington, D.C.: Island Press. Chapter 8 pgs. 55–58.
- Waller, Steven S., Moser, Lowell E., Anderson, Bruce. A Guide for Planning and Analyzing a Year-Round Forage Program. EC 86-113-C.
