= Rangeland management =

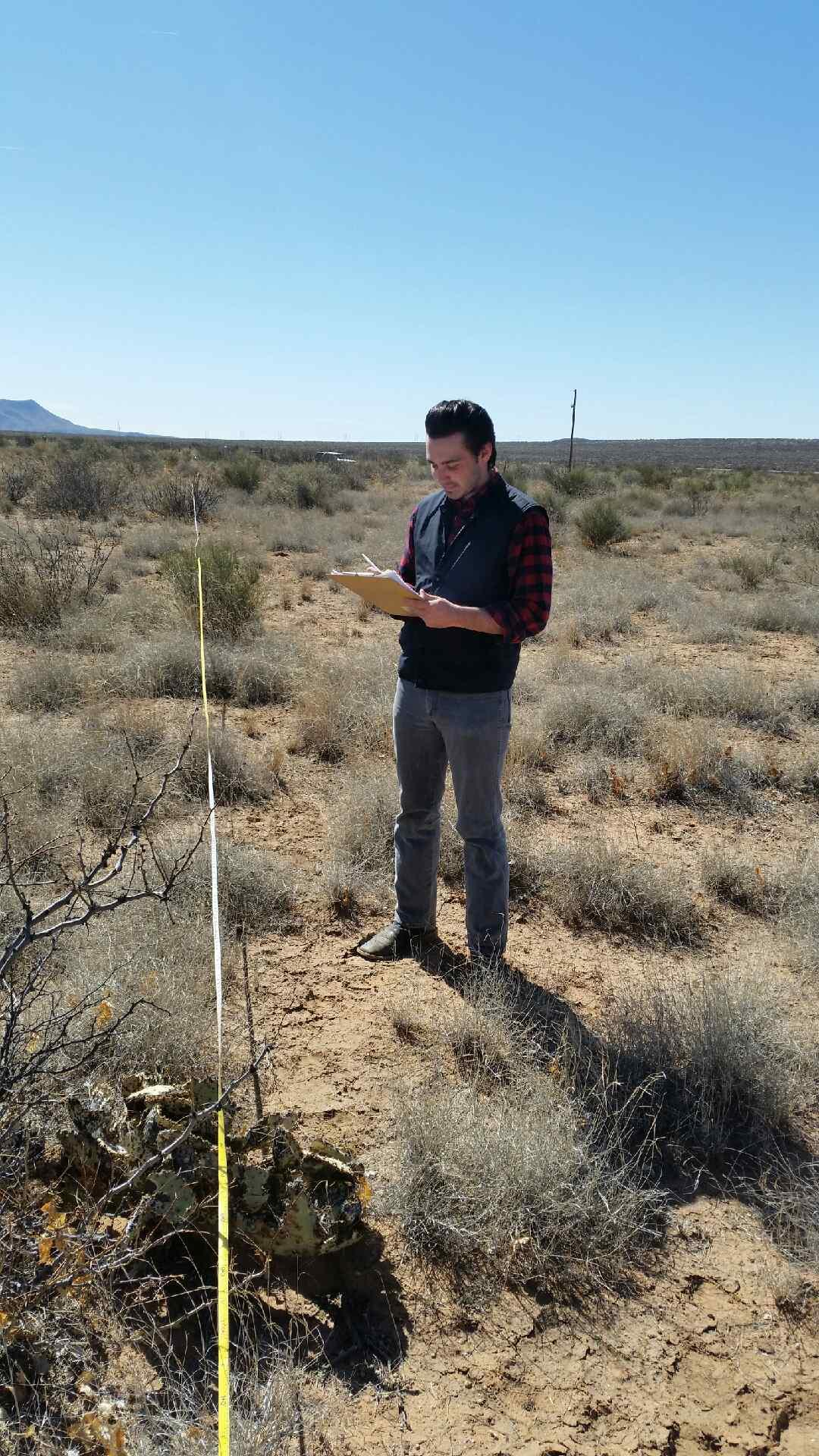
Range Management graduate research assistant recording line point intercept data on southern New Mexican rangeland.

Rangeland management (also range management, range science, or arid-land management) is a natural science that centers around the study of rangelands and the "conservation and sustainable management [of Arid-Lands] for the benefit of current societies and future generations". Range management is defined by Holechek et al. as the "manipulation of rangeland components to obtain optimum combination of goods and services for society on a sustained basis". The United Nations (UN) has declared 2026 the International Year of Rangelands and Pastoralists, with the Food and Agriculture Organization leading the initiative.

== History ==
The earliest form of Rangeland Management is not formally deemed part of the natural science studied today, although its roots can be traced to nomadic grazing practices of the Neolithic Revolution when humans domesticated plants and animals under pressures from population growth and environmental change. Humans might even have altered the environment in times preceding the Neolithic through hunting of large-game, whereby large losses of grazing herbivores could have resulted in altered ecological states; meaning humans have been inadvertently managing land throughout prehistory.

Rangeland management was developed in the United States in response to rangeland deterioration and in some cases, denudation, due to overgrazing and other misuse of arid lands as demonstrated by the 20th century "Dust Bowl" and described in Hardin's 1968 "Tragedy of the Commons". Historically, the discipline focused on the manipulation of grazing and the proper use of rangeland vegetation for livestock.

== Modern application ==
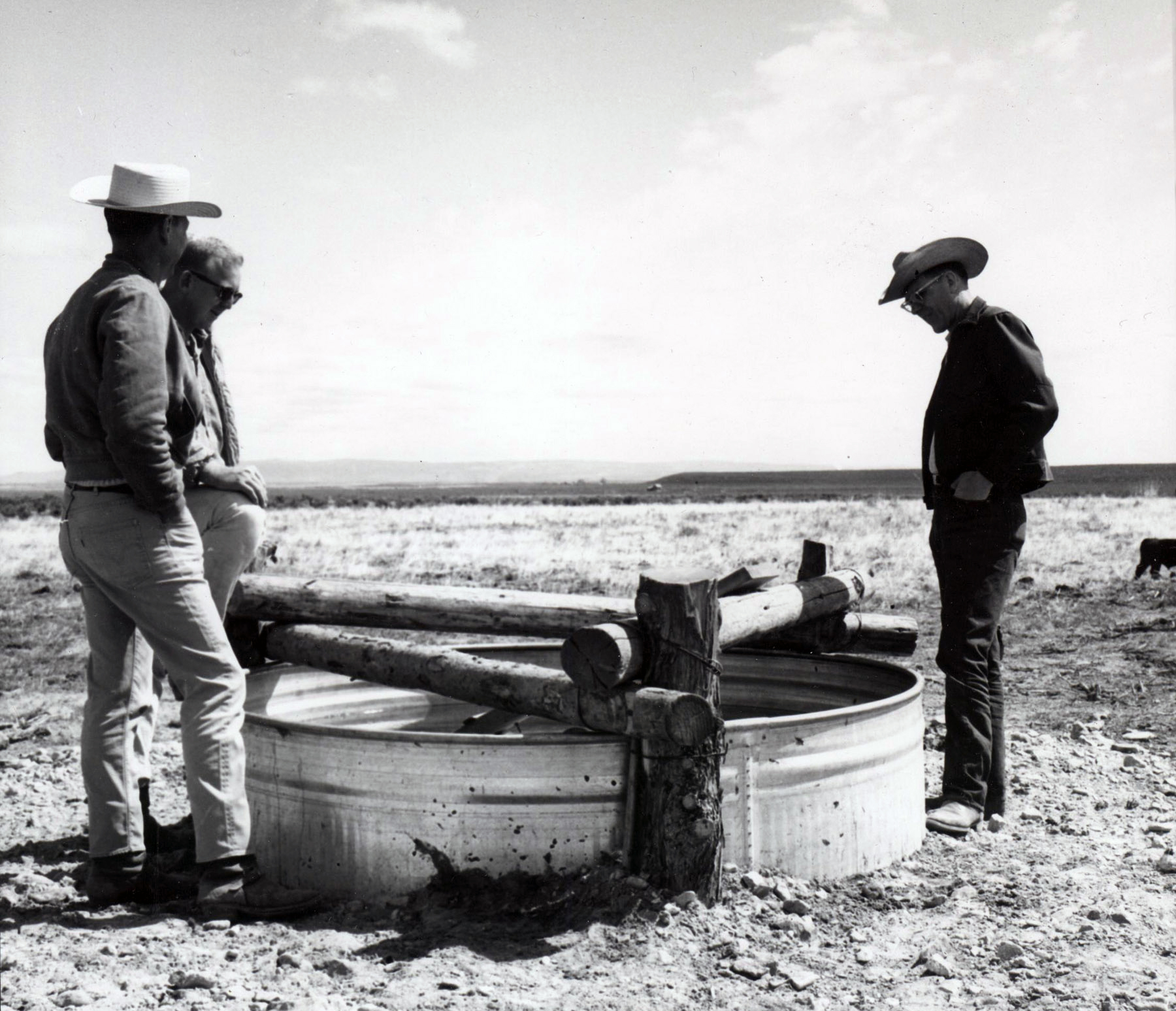
Burns District, Oregon, rangeland water infrastructure development: May, 1954.

=== Global ===
Range management's focus has been expanded to include the host of ecosystem services that rangelands provide to humans world-wide. Key management components seek to optimize such goods and services through the protection and enhancement of soils, riparian zones, watersheds, and vegetation complexes, sustainably improving outputs of consumable range products such as red meat, wildlife, water, wood, fiber, leather, energy resource extraction, and outdoor recreation, as well as maintaining a focus on the manipulation of grazing activities of large herbivores to maintain or improve animal and plant production. With increasing levels of rangeland degradation, for example as evident through woody plant encroachment, active rehabilitation efforts become part of rangeland management.

Pastoralism has become a contemporary anthropological and ecological study as it faces many threats including fragmentation of land, conversion of rangeland into urban development, lack of grazing movement, impending threats on global diversity, damage to species with large terrain, decreases in shared public goods, decreased biological movements, threats of a "tragedy of enclosures", limitation of key resources, reduced biomass and invasive plant species growth. Interest in contemporary pastoralist cultures like the Maasai has continued to increase, especially because the traditional syncreticly-adaptive ability of pastoralists could promise lessons in collaborative and adaptive management for contemporary pastoralist societies threatened by globalization as well as for contemporary non-pastoralist societies that are managing livestock on rangelands.

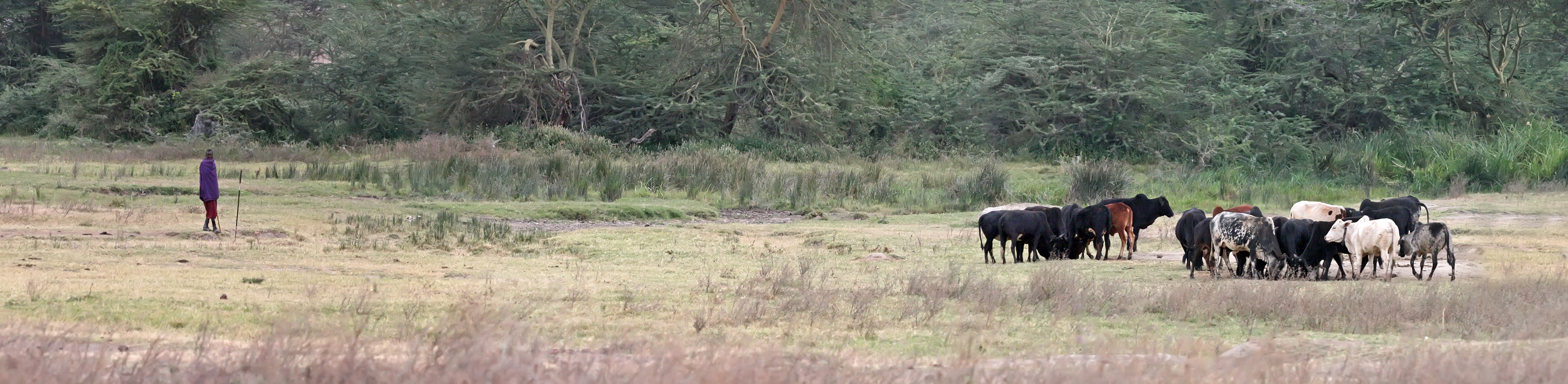
Maasai man herding cattle

=== United States of America ===
The United States Society for Range Management is "the professional society dedicated to supporting persons who work with rangelands and have a commitment to their sustainable use". The primary Rangeland Management publications include the Journal of Range Management, Rangelands, and Rangeland Ecology & Management.

As climate change continues to disrupt a host of rangeland functions, the Society for Range Management has declared that it "is committed to promoting adaptation to and mitigation of climate change through the sponsorship of workshops, symposia, research and educational publications, and appropriate policy recommendations. The Society will strive to maximize opportunities and minimize challenges posed by climate change to promote productive rangeland ecosystems that ensure food security, human livelihoods, and continued delivery of diverse ecosystem services". Emerging evidence suggests that rangelands are extremely vulnerable to the threats of climate change, as more severe heatwaves, droughts, evaporation, and catastrophic flood events will consequentially alter ecological states, and negatively affect forage production, both of which will negatively impact ecosystem functioning and the sustainable production of ecosystem services. In an open letter to the White House in 2017, the president of the SRM offered President Trump the society's support in seeking management strategies to mitigate climate-induced phenomenon like drought and forest fires, a subject which was brought to the national debate stage and which has received significant push-back by Trump and his administration. Likewise in 2021 the SRM and several other institutions sent an open letter to President Biden urging for more research and development funding to be provisioned toward agricultural and food systems research, especially as climate change threatened national security of agricultural resources.

=== Australia ===
The Australian Rangeland Society is the peak group of rangeland professionals in Australia. It is an independent and non-aligned association of people interested in the management and sustainable use of rangelands. Rangeland Management publications from the Society include The Rangeland Journal and the Range Management Newsletter.

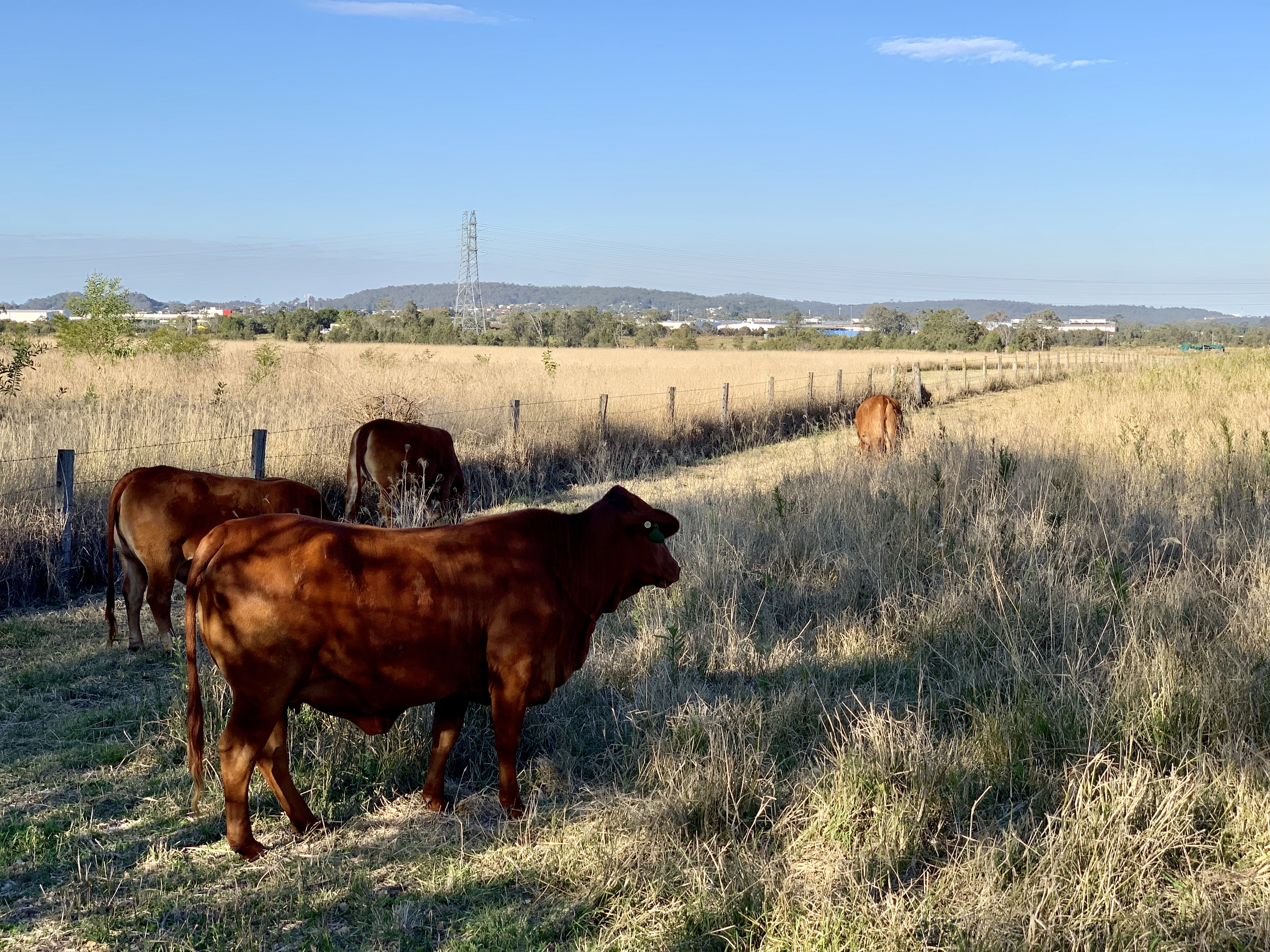
Grazing cattle, Oxley Creek Common, Rocklea, Queensland, Australia

== Education and employment ==
Bouteloua gracilis illustration on the cover of a rangeland monitoring guide book developed by the Bureau of Land Management

In the United States, the study of range science is commonly offered at land-grant universities including New Mexico State University, Colorado State University, Oregon State University, North Dakota State University, South Dakota State University, Texas A&M University, Texas Tech University, the University of Arizona, the University of Idaho, the University of Wyoming, Utah State University, and Montana State University. The Range Science curriculum is strongly tied to animal science, as well as plant ecology, soil science, wildlife management, climatology and anthropology. Courses in a typical Range Science curriculum may include ethology, range animal nutrition, plant physiology, plant ecology, plant identification, plant communities, microbiology, soil sciences, fire control, agricultural economics, wildlife ecology, ranch management, Socioeconomics, cartography, hydrology, Ecophysiology, and environmental policy. These courses are essential to entering a range science profession.

Students with degrees in range science are eligible for a host of technician-type careers working for the federal government under the Bureau of Land Management, the United States Fish and Wildlife Service, the Agricultural Research Service, the United States Environmental Protection Agency, the NRCS, or the US Forest Service as range conservationists, inventory technicians, range monitoring/animal science agents, field botanists, natural-resource technicians, vegetation/habitat monitors, GIS programming assistants, general range technicians, and as ecological assessors, as well as working in the private sector as range managers, ranch managers, producers, commercial consultants, mining and agricultural real estate agents, or as Range/ Ranch Consultants. Individuals who complete degrees at the M.S. or P.h.D. level, can seek academic careers as professors, extension specialists, research assistants, and adjunct staff, in addition to a number of professional research positions for government agencies such as the US Department of Agriculture and other state run departments.

== See also ==
- Conservation grazing
- Land management
- Natural Resources Conservation Service
- Range condition scoring
- Wildlife management
- Upland pasture
