= Lowland semi-natural grassland =

Type of grassland

Lowland semi-natural grassland is grassland that has not had significant fertilizer or herbicide applied to it, and exists at an altitude of less than 350 metres. Such grasslands are sometimes managed as grazing or as winter food for livestock -cutting for hay or silage. They are generally meadow or pasture land. Because of their traditional management, they contain a high diversity of species native to the particular country.

== Historical ==
They have formed as a result of human activity. For example, forest clearing, and subsequent grazing and clearing of scrub. The plant species were formerly from woodland plants. Man has been managing land since Mesolithic times.

== Types of grassland ==
There are 5 categories of semi-natural grassland in the UK:

- Neutral/mesotrophic grassland. Have a ph of between 5 and 6.5. They lie between extremes of acidity and alkanity, wetness and dryness. Few large sites remain, and are typically used for grazing and hay production.
- Calcerous grassland. ph 6.5 to 8.5, typically on limestone chalk. Mostly used for grazing.
- Acidic/Calcifugous grassland
- Fen meadows and rush pastures
- Calaminarian grassland

== Threats ==
- Lack of grazing and cutting leads to successional changes to scrub and woodland
