= Rangeland =

Biomes that can be grazed by animals

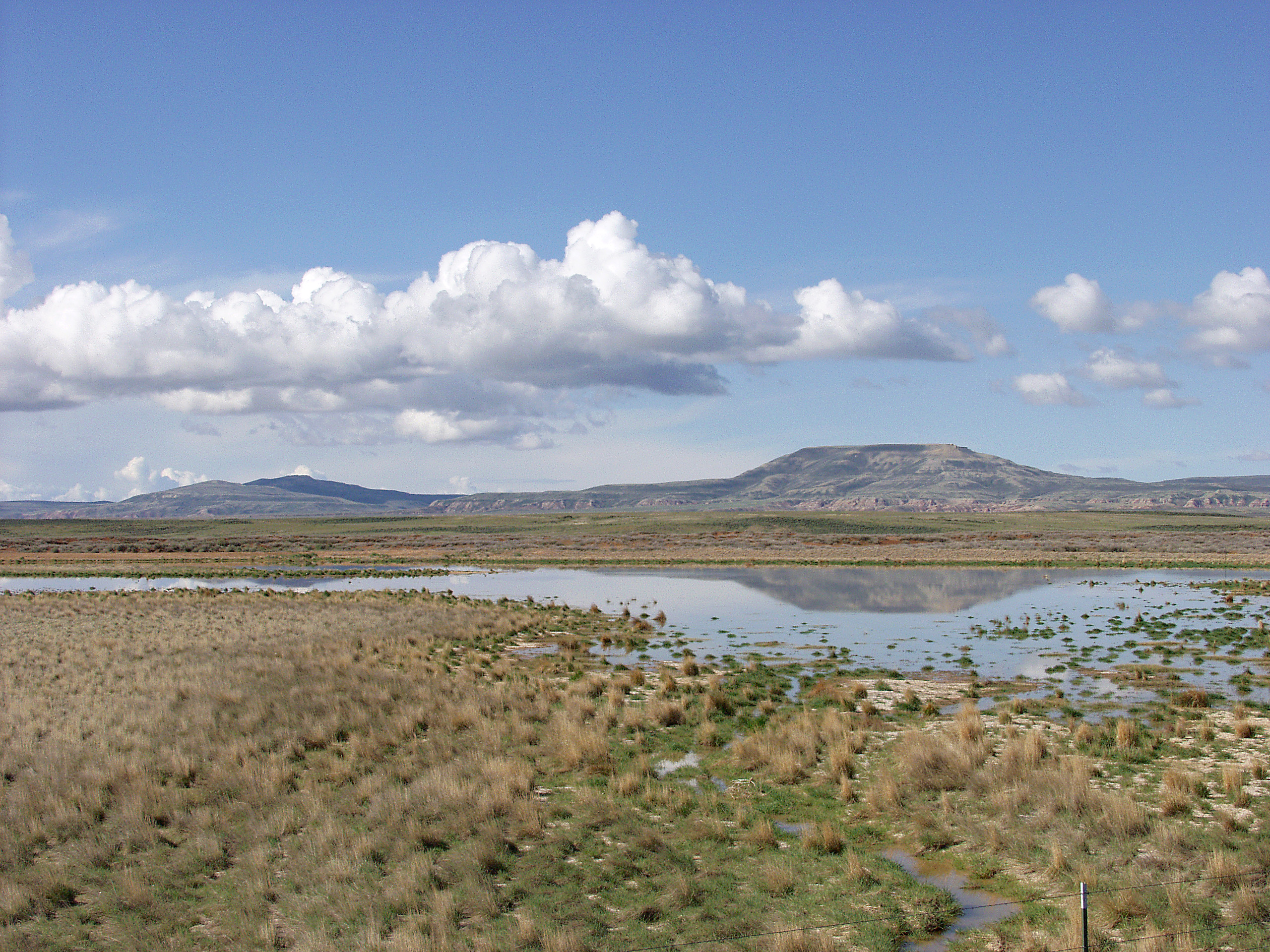
Red Desert rangeland in Wyoming. Water from melted snow pack can be seen on the ground. Such melting is the main source of surface water in Wyoming.

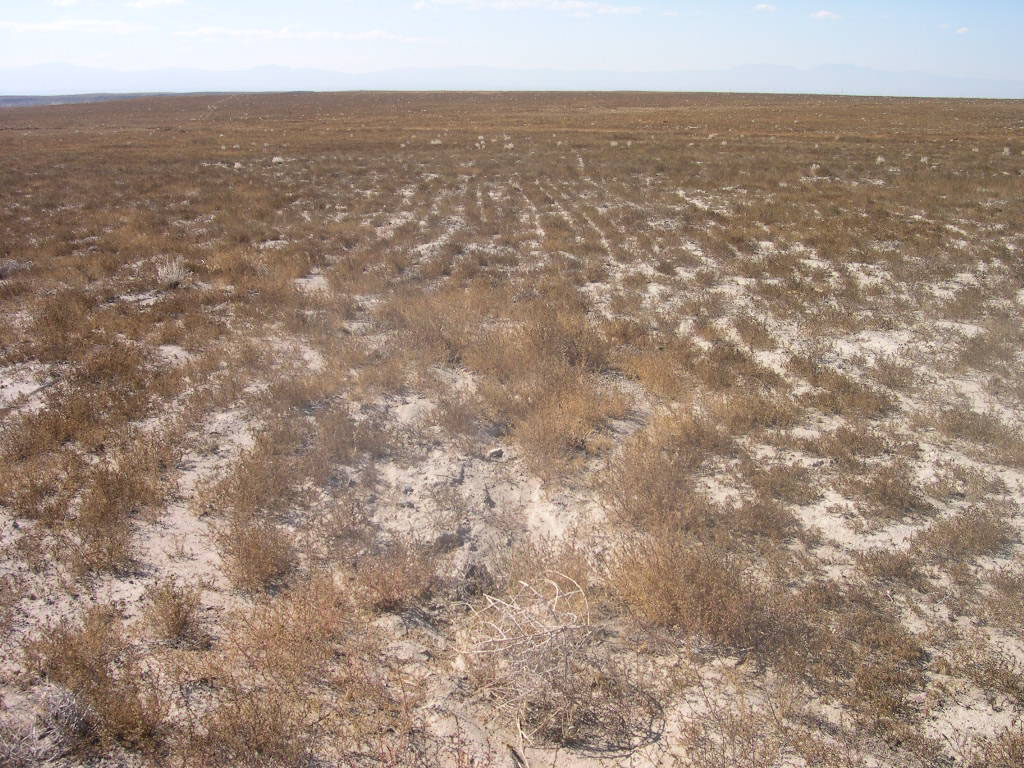
Weeds are all that remains in Idaho after a failed restoration project following wildfire, and subsequent invasion by non-native species. Russian thistle (Salsola tragus) is the only plant species seen in this picture.

Rangelands are grasslands, shrublands, woodlands, wetlands, and deserts that are grazed by domestic livestock or wild animals. Types of rangelands include tallgrass and shortgrass prairies, desert grasslands and shrublands, woodlands, savannas, chaparrals, steppes, open forest, and tundras. Rangelands do not include forests lacking grazable understory vegetation, barren desert, farmland, or land covered by solid rock, concrete, or glaciers.

Rangelands are distinguished from pasture lands because they grow primarily native vegetation rather than plants established by humans. Rangelands are also managed principally with practices such as managed livestock grazing and prescribed fire rather than more intensive agricultural practices of seeding, irrigation, and the use of fertilizers.

Grazing is an important use of rangelands but the term 'rangeland' is not synonymous with 'grazingland'. Livestock grazing can be used to manage rangelands by harvesting forage to produce livestock, changing plant composition, or reducing fuel loads.

Fire is also an essential regulator of range vegetation, whether set by humans or resulting from lightning. Fires tend to reduce the abundance of woody plants and promote herbaceous plants, including grasses, forbs, and grass-like plants. The suppression or reduction of periodic wildfires from desert shrublands, savannas, or woodlands frequently invites the dominance of trees and shrubs to the near exclusion of grasses and forbs.

The United Nations (UN) declared 2026 the International Year of Rangelands and Pastoralists, with the Food and Agriculture Organization leading the initiative.

== Etymology and definition ==
The United States Environmental Protection Agency defines rangeland as "lands on which the native vegetation (climax or natural potential plant community) is predominantly grasses, grass-like plants, forbs, or shrubs suitable for grazing or browsing use." The EPA classifies natural grassland and savannas as rangeland, and in some cases includes wetlands, deserts, tundra, and "certain forb and shrub communities." The primary difference between rangeland and pasture is management; rangelands tend to have natural vegetation along with a few introduced plant species, but all managed by grazing, while pastures have forage that is adapted for livestock and managed, by seeding, mowing, fertilization and irrigation.

== Types of rangeland ==
According to the UNCCD, 35% of rangelands are deserts and xeric shrublands, 26% tropical and subtropical grasslands, savannas and shrublands, 15% tundra, 13% temperate grasslands, savannahs and shrublands, 6% montane grasslands and shrublands, 4% mediterranean forests, woodlands and scrub, as well as 1% flooded grasslands and savannahs.

=== Prairie ===
Prairies are considered part of the temperate grasslands, savannas and shrublands biome by ecologists, based on similar temperate climates, moderate rainfall, and grasses, herbs, and shrubs, rather than trees, as the dominant vegetation type. Temperate grassland regions include the Pampas of Argentina, and the steppes of Eurasia.

=== Grasslands ===
Grasslands are areas where the vegetation is dominated by grasses (Poaceae) and other herbaceous (non-woody) plants. However, sedge (Cyperaceae) and rush (Juncaceae) families can also be found. Grasslands occur naturally on all continents except Antarctica. In temperate latitudes, such as northwest Europe and the Great Plains and California in North America, native grasslands are dominated by perennial bunch grass species, whereas in warmer climates annual species form a greater component of the vegetation.

=== Steppe ===
Steppe, in physical geography, refers to a biome region characterized by grassland plain without trees apart from those near rivers and lakes. The prairie (especially the shortgrass and mixed prairie) is an example of a steppe, though it is not usually called such. It may be semi-desert, or covered with grass or shrubs or both, depending on the season and latitude. The term is also used to denote the climate encountered in regions too dry to support a forest, but not dry enough to be a desert.

=== Pampas ===
Pampas are the fertile South American lowlands that include the Argentine provinces of Buenos Aires, La Pampa, Santa Fe, Entre Ríos and Córdoba, most of Uruguay, and the State of Rio Grande do Sul, in the southernmost end of Brazil covering more than 750,000 km^{2} (289,577 sq mi). These vast plains are only interrupted by the low Ventana and Tandil hills near Bahía Blanca and Tandil (Argentina), with a height of 1,300 m (4,265 ft) and 500 m (1,640 ft) respectively. The climate is mild, with precipitation of 600 mm (23.6 in) to 1,200 mm (47.2 in), more or less evenly distributed through the year, making the soils appropriate for agriculture. This area is also one of the distinct physiography provinces of the larger Paraná-Paraguay Plain division. These plains contain unique wildlife because of the different terrains around it. Some of this wildlife includes the rhea, the badger, and the prairie chicken.

=== Shrubland ===
Shrubland is a plant community characterized by vegetation dominated by shrubs, often also including grasses, herbs, and geophytes. Shrubland may either occur naturally or be the result of human activity. It may be the mature vegetation type in a particular region and remain stable over time, or a transitional community that occurs temporarily as the result of a disturbance, such as fire. A stable state may be maintained by regular natural disturbance such as fire or browsing. Shrubland may be unsuitable for human habitation because of the danger of fire. The term "shrubland" was first coined in 1903.

=== Woodland ===
Woodland is a low-density forest forming open habitats with plenty of sunlight and limited shade. Woodlands may support an understory of shrubs and herbaceous plants including grasses. Woodland may form a transition to shrubland under drier conditions or during early stages of primary or secondary succession. Higher densities and areas of trees, with largely closed canopy, provide extensive and nearly continuous shade are referred to as forest.

=== Savanna ===
Savanna is a grassland ecosystem characterized by the trees being sufficiently small or widely spaced so that the canopy does not close. The open canopy allows sufficient light to reach the ground to support an unbroken herbaceous layer consisting primarily of C4 grasses.

=== Desert ===
Desert is a landscape or region that receives an extremely low amount of precipitation, defined as areas with an average annual precipitation of less than 250 millimetres (10 in) per year, or as areas where more water is lost by evapotranspiration than falls as precipitation. In the Köppen climate classification system, deserts are classed as BWh (hot desert) or BWk (temperate desert). In the Thornthwaite climate classification system, deserts would be classified as arid megathermal climates.

=== Tundra ===
Tundra is a biome where the tree growth is hindered by low temperatures and short growing seasons. The term tundra comes through Russian тундра from the Kildin Sami word tūndâr "uplands," "treeless mountain tract." There are three types of tundra: Arctic tundra, alpine tundra, and Antarctic tundra In tundra, the vegetation is composed of dwarf shrubs, sedges and grasses, mosses, and lichens. Scattered trees grow in some tundra. The ecotone (or ecological boundary region) between the tundra and the forest is known as the tree line or timberline.

== Uses of rangeland ==
Rangelands produce a wide variety of goods and services including livestock forage (Grazing), wildlife habitat, water, mineral resources, wood products, wild land recreation, open space and natural beauty. The geographic extent and resources of rangelands make their proper use and management necessary.

== Rangeland degradation challenges ==
The degradation of Earth's extensive rangelands due to overuse, inappropriate cultivation, misuse, climate change, and biodiversity loss represents a significant threat to humanity's food supply and the well-being or survival of billions of people.

In 2024, the United Nations Convention to Combat Desertification (UNCCD) reported that up to 50% of rangelands are degraded. These areas suffer from reduced soil fertility, woody encroachment and other invasive species, erosion, salinization, alkalinization, and soil compaction, which all inhibit plant growth and contribute to drought and fluctuations in precipitation. This degradation is primarily driven by the conversion of pastures to cropland, urban expansion, increasing demands for food, fiber, and fuel, excessive grazing, abandonment by pastoralists, and policies that incentivize overexploitation. The UNCCD observes that the loss of rangeland attracts little public attention and rarely features in international policy discussions.

Initiatives that promote afforestation in rangelands are criticised for being ineffective and misguided. Rangeland afforestation is partly based on the contested assumption that rangelands represent degraded forests, rather than natural biomes.

== Global extent ==
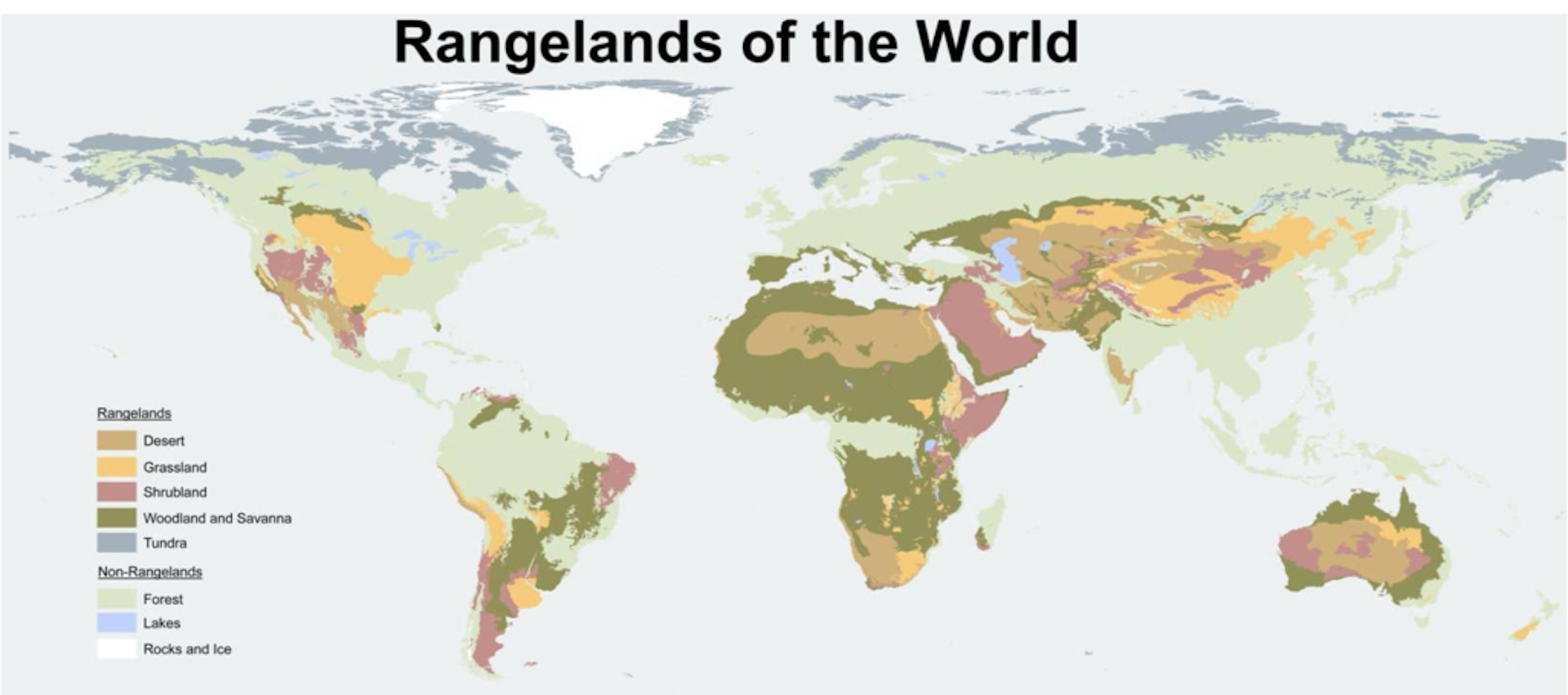
A map showing the world's rangelands, and areas that are not rangeland

Rangelands cover up to 8 billion hectares of land globally and therewith 54% of the terrestrial surface. 78% of rangelands occur in drylands.

=== Canada ===
Rangeland is a prominent feature of rural Canada. A provincial jurisdiction, administration and policy regarding range use varies across the country. As in many other Commonwealth countries, public tenures on crown land for the purpose of range activities are common in geographically compatible areas. Reconciling the economic needs of ranchers and the need for environmental conservation is one of the primary themes in modern range discourse.

In western Canada, both grassland and forested range are significant. In British Columbia, 70 percent of grassland range is privately owned and 60 percent of the total annual livestock forage requirement is provided by grazing on Crown rangeland (34 million hectares), 80 percent of which is forested range. Grassland range predominates in much of the prairie provinces' ranching area; however, forested range is particularly important in the boreal region.

Certain rangelands are preserved as provincially-protected areas similar to parks, others are managed as community resources. For example, in Alberta since 2003 there has been legislation allowing the creation of "Heritage Rangelands" within the parks system. As of 2012 there were 2 heritage rangelands and 6 proposed future heritage rangelands run by Alberta Parks. There are also 32 provincial grazing reserves located throughout Alberta administered as public lands by Alberta Sustainable Resource Development. The federal government has administered several "Community Pastures" in Western Canada that were reclaimed lands suffering erosion during the 1930s. In 2012, it was announced that this federal involvement would be phased out over a six-year period.

=== United States ===
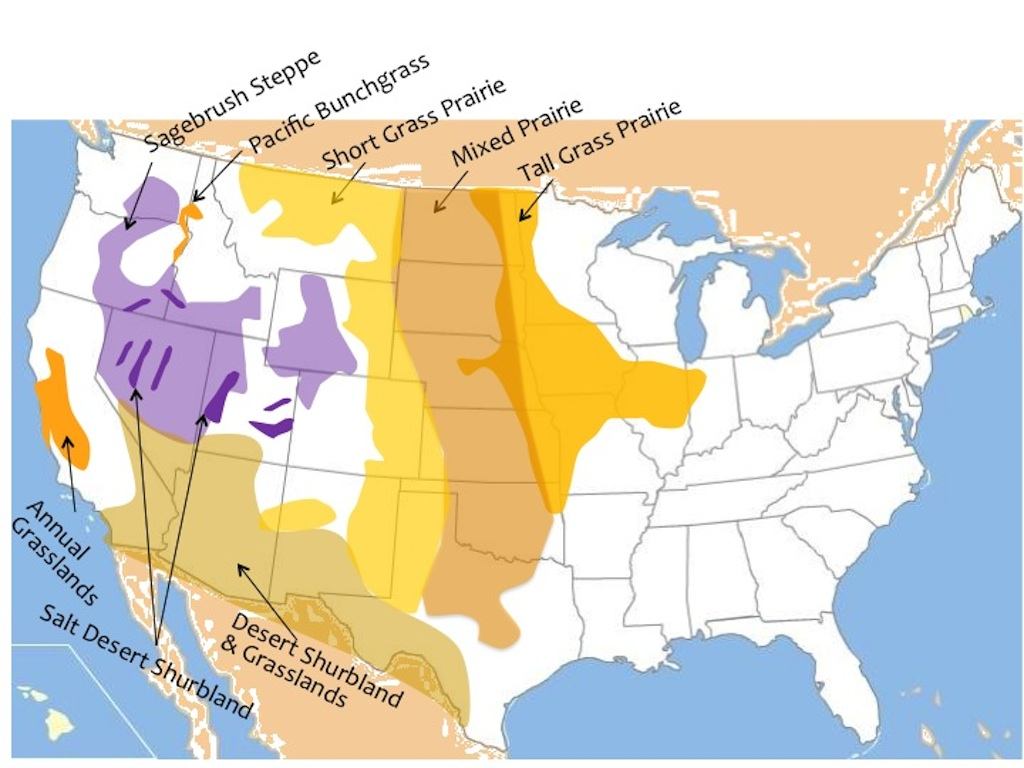
Rangelands of the United States

Of the land within the United States borders, 36% is considered rangeland. The western side of the United States is 53% rangeland. Around 399 million acres (1,610,000 km^{2}) of rangeland are privately owned. The Bureau of Land Management manages about 167 million acres (676,000 km^{2}) of publicly owned rangeland, with the United States Forest Service managing approximately 95 million acres (380,000 km^{2}) more. Ranchers may lease portions of this public rangeland and pay a fee based on the number and type of livestock and the period for which they are on the land.

Historically much of the land in the western United States was used for grazing and much of some states still is. In many of those states, such as Arizona, an open-range law applies which requires a land owner to fence cattle out rather than in; thus cattle are theoretically allowed to roam free. In modern times open-range laws can conflict with urban development as occasional stray cows, bulls, or even herds wander into subdivisions or onto highways.

=== North American rangelands – grasslands ===
- Tall Grass Prairie
- Mixed Grass Prairie
- Short Grass Prairie
- Pacific Bunchgrass
- Annual Grasslands

=== North American rangelands – shrublands ===
- Sagebrush Steppe
- Salt Desert Shrublands
- Desert Shrublands

=== Australia ===
Australia's rangelands extend from tropical savannas in the north dominated by summer rainfall, through large areas of desert in central Australia, to the southern rangelands dominated by winter rainfall. They cover approximately 80 per cent of the Australian continent and equate broadly with the 'Outback'. However, rangelands also occur in higher rainfall areas where limitations other than rainfall restrict use to management of the natural landscape. The rangelands are where values and societal benefits are based primarily on natural resources. They are areas which have not been intensively developed for agriculture but extensive livestock production is a major land use, accounting for 55 per cent of the rangelands. Conservation reserves utilise around 11 per cent of the rangelands and the rangelands have areas of significant biodiversity and natural attractions on a world scale. Although mining and petroleum extraction uses a very small percentage of the rangelands, it economically contributes most to Australia's Gross Domestic Product compared with other rangeland industries (cattle, sheep and goat production, tourism, harvesting of native products). Indigenous land tenures of various types cover around 59 per cent of the rangelands and overlap with grazing and conservation uses. Although rangelands cover 80 per cent of Australia's land mass, at the 2016 Census, they were home to just over two per cent of the population (394,000 people), with 28 per cent of rangeland residents identifying as being Indigenous.

=== South America ===
Rangelands in South America are located in regions with climate ranging from arid to sub-humid. Annual precipitation in these areas ranges from approximately 150 to 1500 mm (6–60 inches). Within South America, rangelands cover about 33% of the total land area. South American rangelands include; grasslands, shrublands, savannas, and hot and cold deserts. Rangelands in South America exclude hyperarid deserts. Examples of the South American rangelands include the Patagonian Steppe, the Monte, the Pampas, the "Llanos" or "Cerrado," the "Chaco" and the "Caatinga." The change in the intensity and location of tropical thunderstorms and other weather patterns is the driving force in the climates of southern South America.

=== Africa ===
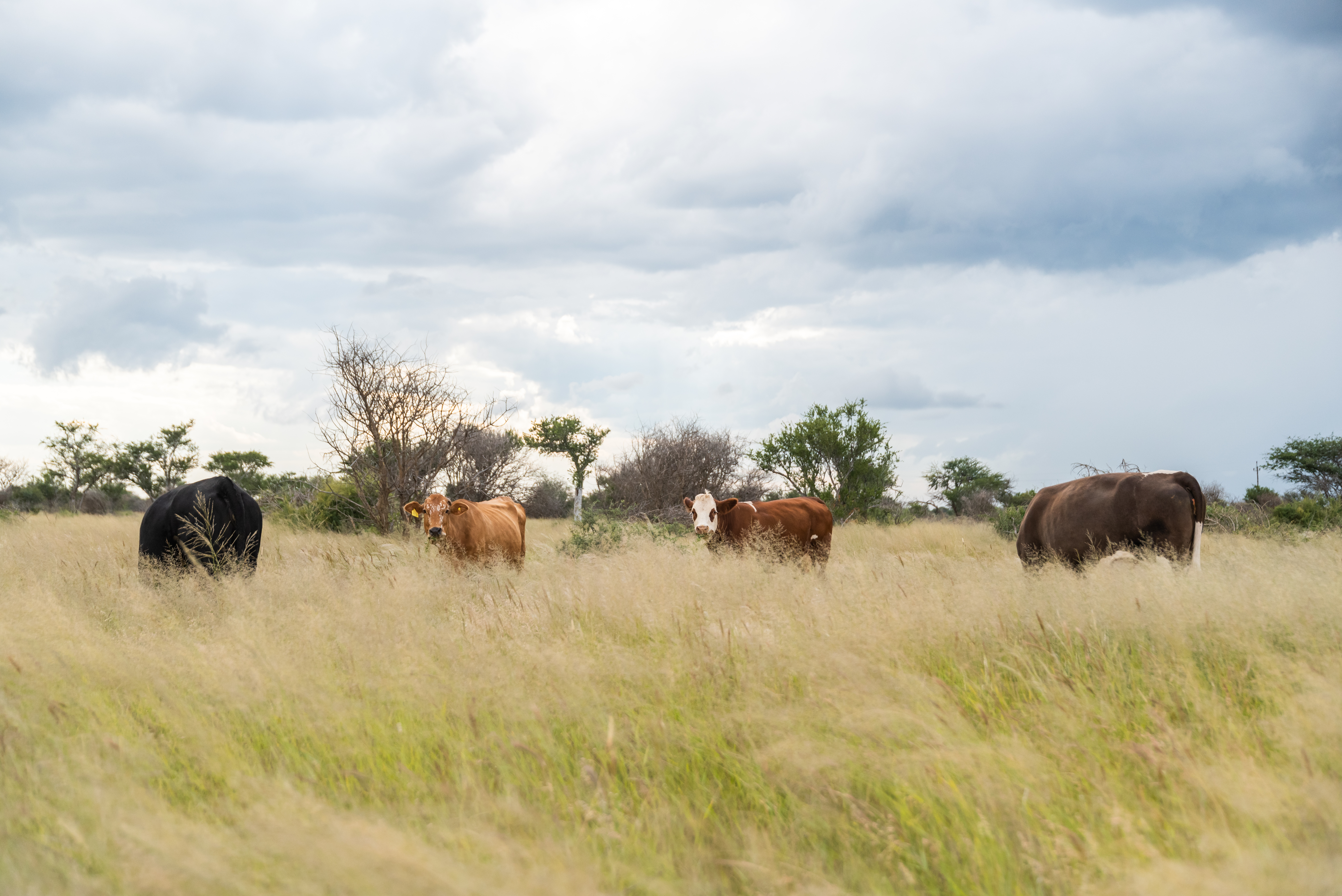
Cattle on savanna rangeland in Namibia

In Kenya, rangelands make up for 85% of the land surface area, and are largely inhabited by nomadic pastoralists who are largely dependent on livestock. This movement often brings along an incursion of different diseases with the common one being the rinderpest virus in the Kenyan wildlife population from the Somali ecosystem.

=== Asia ===
In the past, rangelands in western China supported a pastoral economy and large wildlife populations. Now the rangelands have shrunk due to population growth, economic, government, and social factors. Rangeland types in China include; Semi-desert, Dry Alpine Grasslands, Alpine Dwarf Shrub, Wetland types.

== Gallery ==
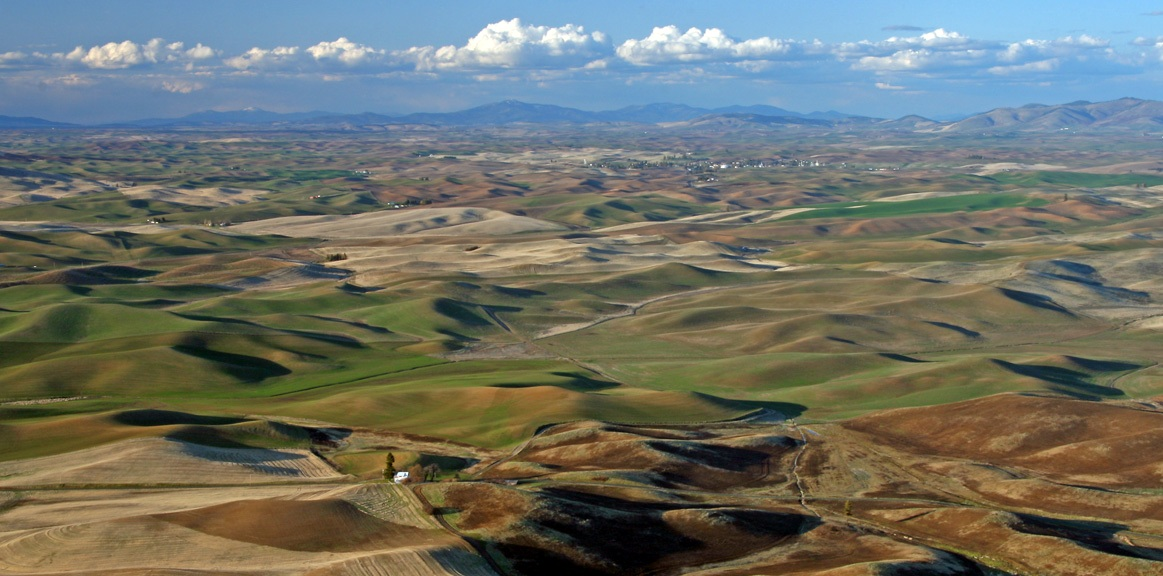
Palouse Hills of Washington

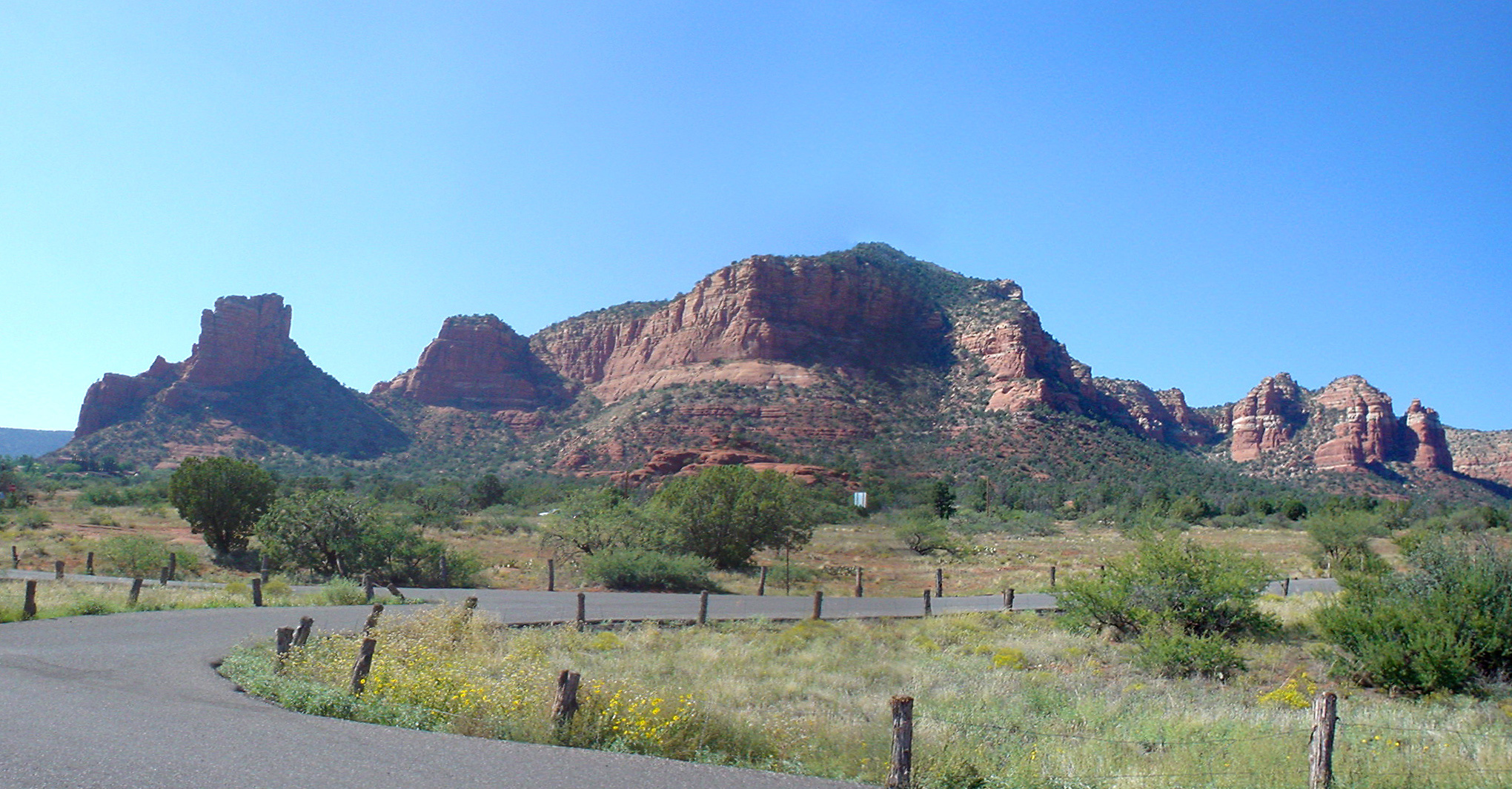
Sonoran Desert

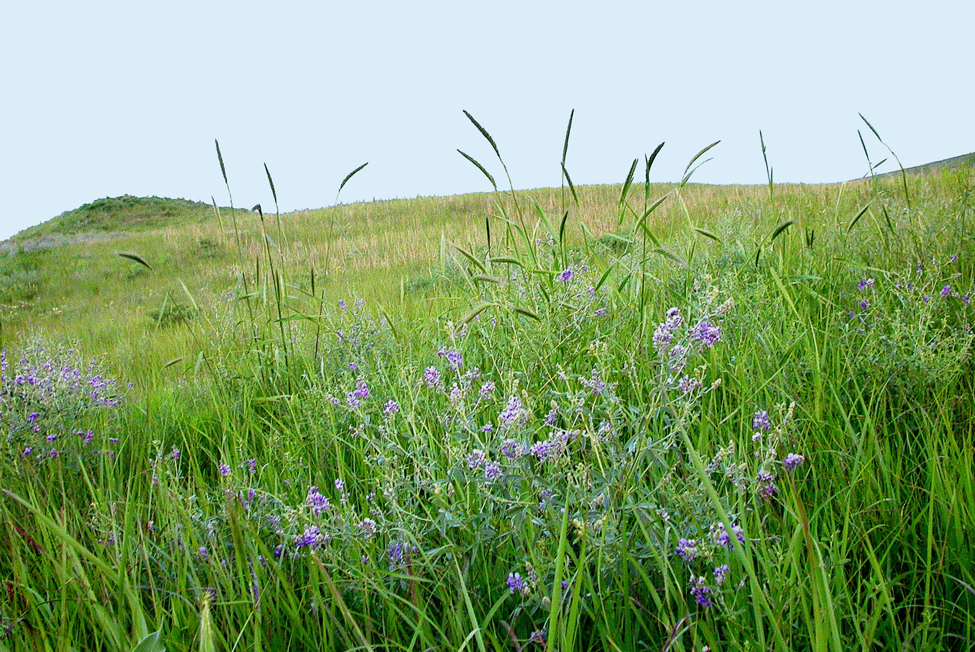
Konza Prairie

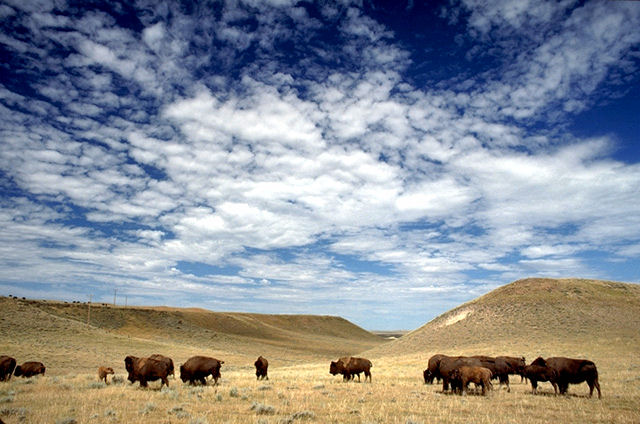
Buffalo grazing on rangeland in Crook County, Wyoming.

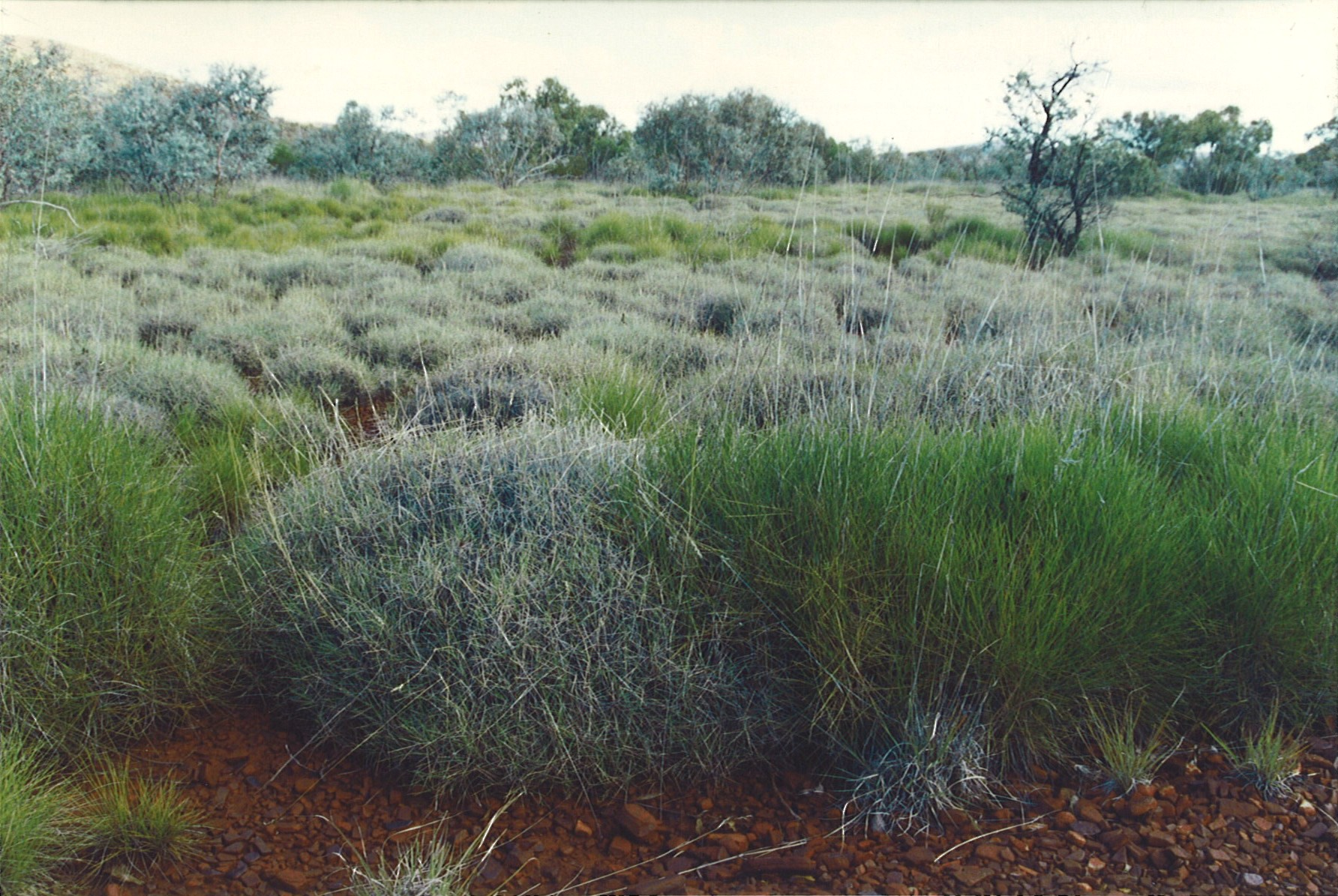
Triodia Hummock Grasslands

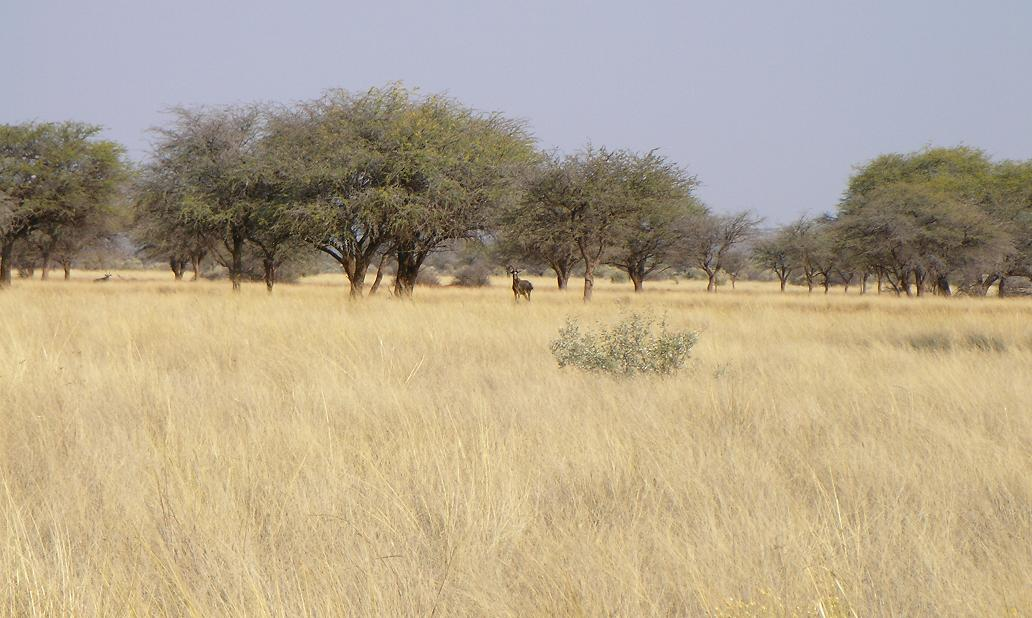
Savannah in southern Africa

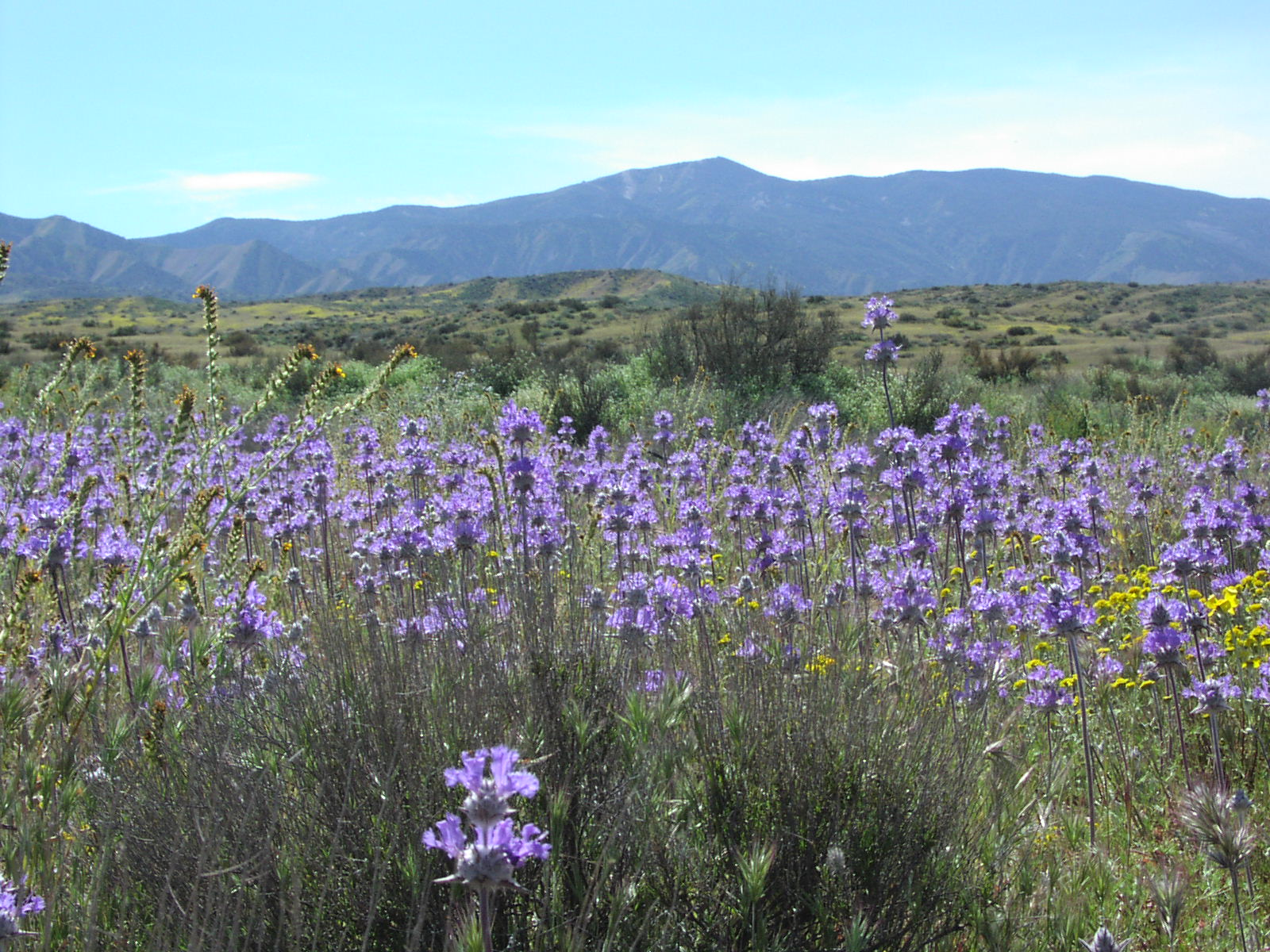
Caliente Peak, California

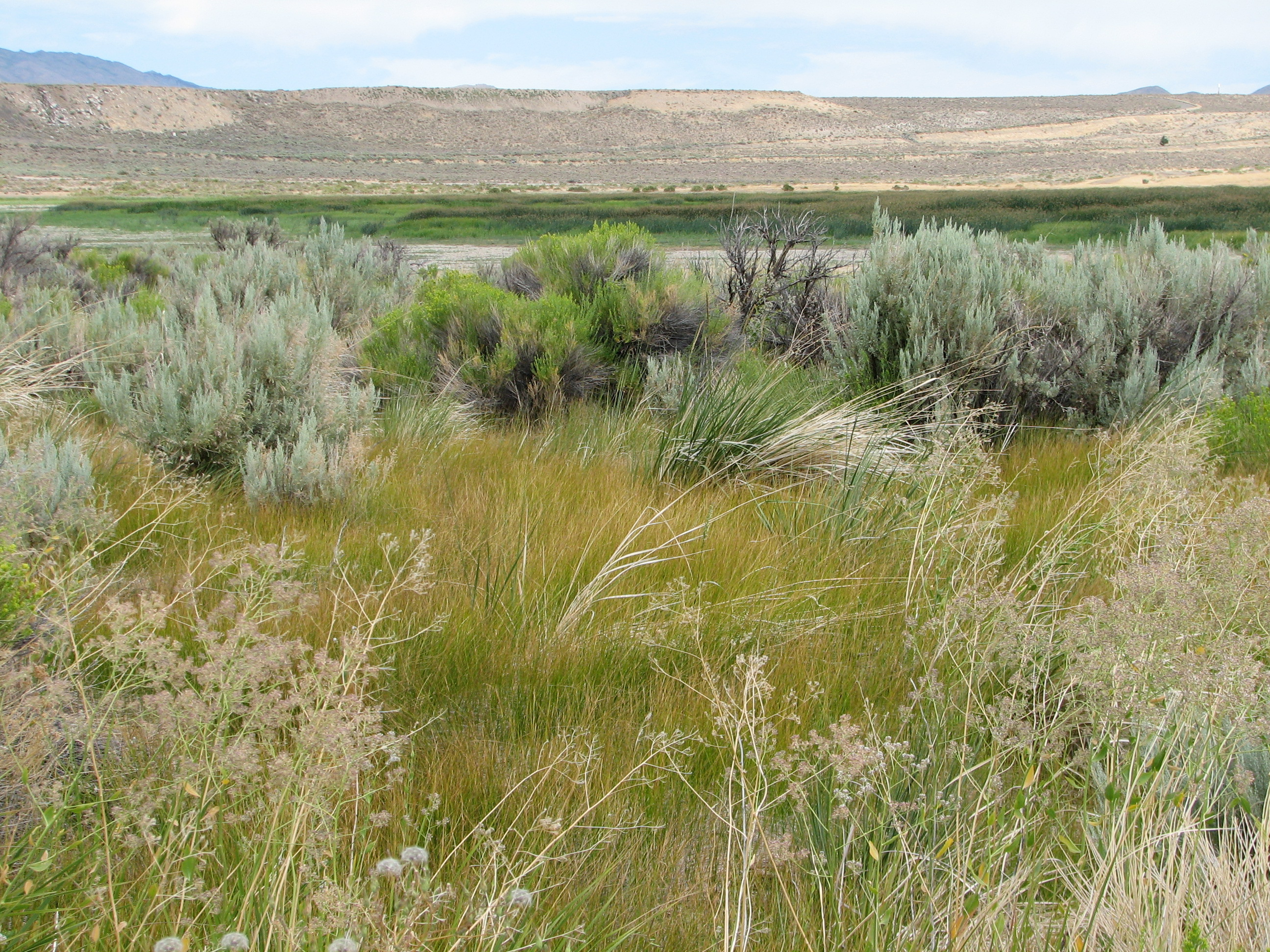
Lake Swan, Nevada

== See also ==
- Applied ecology
- Coastal plain
- Coastal prairie
- Experimental range
- Field
- Forage
- Grassland
- Grass valley
- Holistic management
- Meadow
- Pasture
- Potrero
- Plain
- Prairie
- Range condition scoring
- Savanna
- Steppe
- Veld
