= Leitebakk =

Village in Giske Municipality, Norway

Leitebakk Leitebakken
- Village
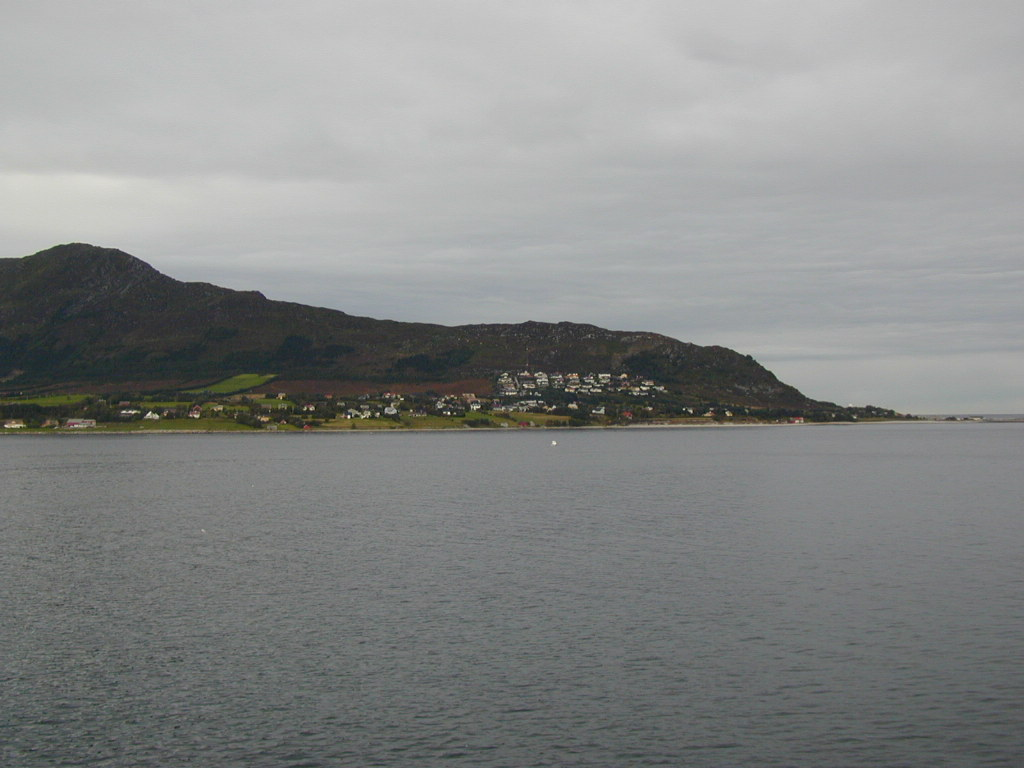
- View of Leitebakk on Godøya
- Interactive map of Leitebakk
- Location within Møre og Romsdal Location within Norway
- Coordinates: 62.4796°N 6.0319°E
- Country: Norway
- Region: Western Norway
- County: Møre og Romsdal
- District: Sunnmøre
- Municipality: Giske Municipality

Area
  - Total: 0.76 km^{2} (0.29 sq mi)
- Elevation: 70 m (230 ft)

Population (2024)
  - Total: 994
  - Density: 1,308/km^{2} (3,390/sq mi)
- Time zone: UTC+01:00 (CET)
  - Summer (DST): UTC+02:00 (CEST)
- Post Code: 6055 Godøya

Leitebakk or Leitebakken is a small village on the island of Godøya in Giske Municipality in Møre og Romsdal county, Norway. The village is located about 4 kilometres (2.5 mi) southeast of the isolated village of Alnes, where Alnes Lighthouse is located. Leitebakk is located at the end of the undersea Godøy Tunnel that connects the island to the neighboring island of Giske. Godøy Chapel is located just south of the village of Leitebakk.

The 0.76-square-kilometre (190-acre) village has a population (2024) of 994 and a population density of 1,308 inhabitants per square kilometre (3,390/sq mi).
