= Giske (village) =

Village in Giske Municipality, Norway

- Village
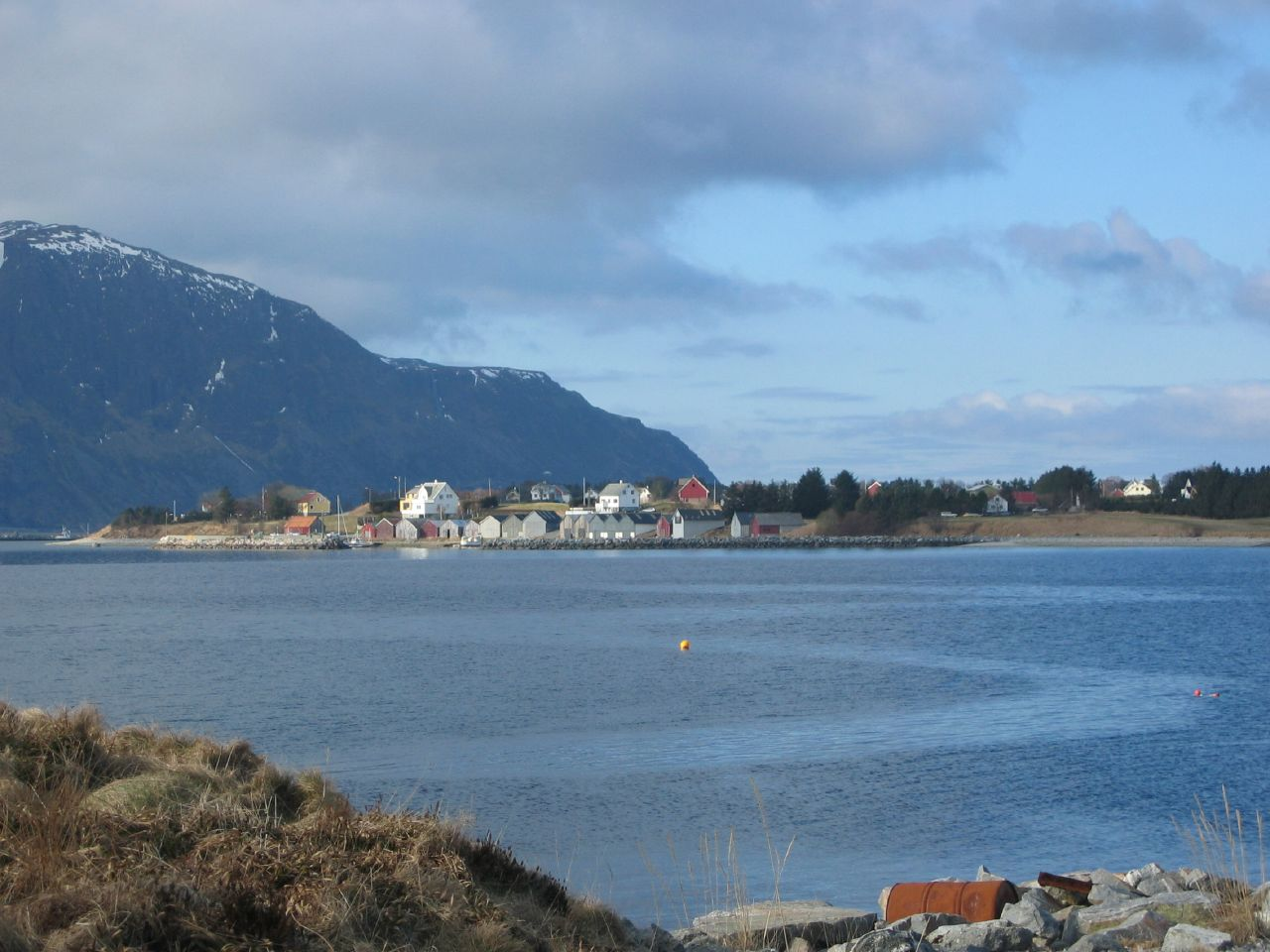
- View of the village
- Interactive map of Giske
- Location within Møre og Romsdal Location within Norway
- Coordinates: 62.50379°N 6.05019°E
- Country: Norway
- Region: Western Norway
- County: Møre og Romsdal
- District: Sunnmøre
- Municipality: Giske Municipality

Area
  - Total: 0.75 km^{2} (0.29 sq mi)
- Elevation: 13 m (43 ft)

Population (2024)
  - Total: 813
  - Density: 1,084/km^{2} (2,810/sq mi)
- Time zone: UTC+01:00 (CET)
  - Summer (DST): UTC+02:00 (CEST)
- Post Code: 6052 Giske

Giske is a village in Giske Municipality in Møre og Romsdal county, Norway. The village is located on the island of Giske. The village takes up most of the central part of the island and it is the only village on the small island.

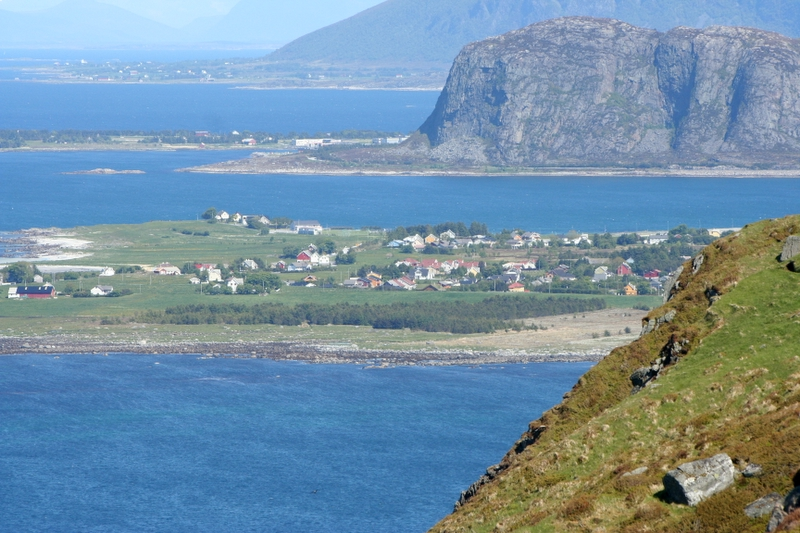
View of the flat island of Giske

Giske Church is located just outside the village centre, on the south side of the island. The entrance to the Godøy Tunnel is located on the north side of the village.

The 0.75-square-kilometre (190-acre) village has a population (2024) of 813 and a population density of 1,084 inhabitants per square kilometre (2,810/sq mi).
