= Valderøy Church =

Church in Møre og Romsdal, Norway

- Valderøy kyrkje
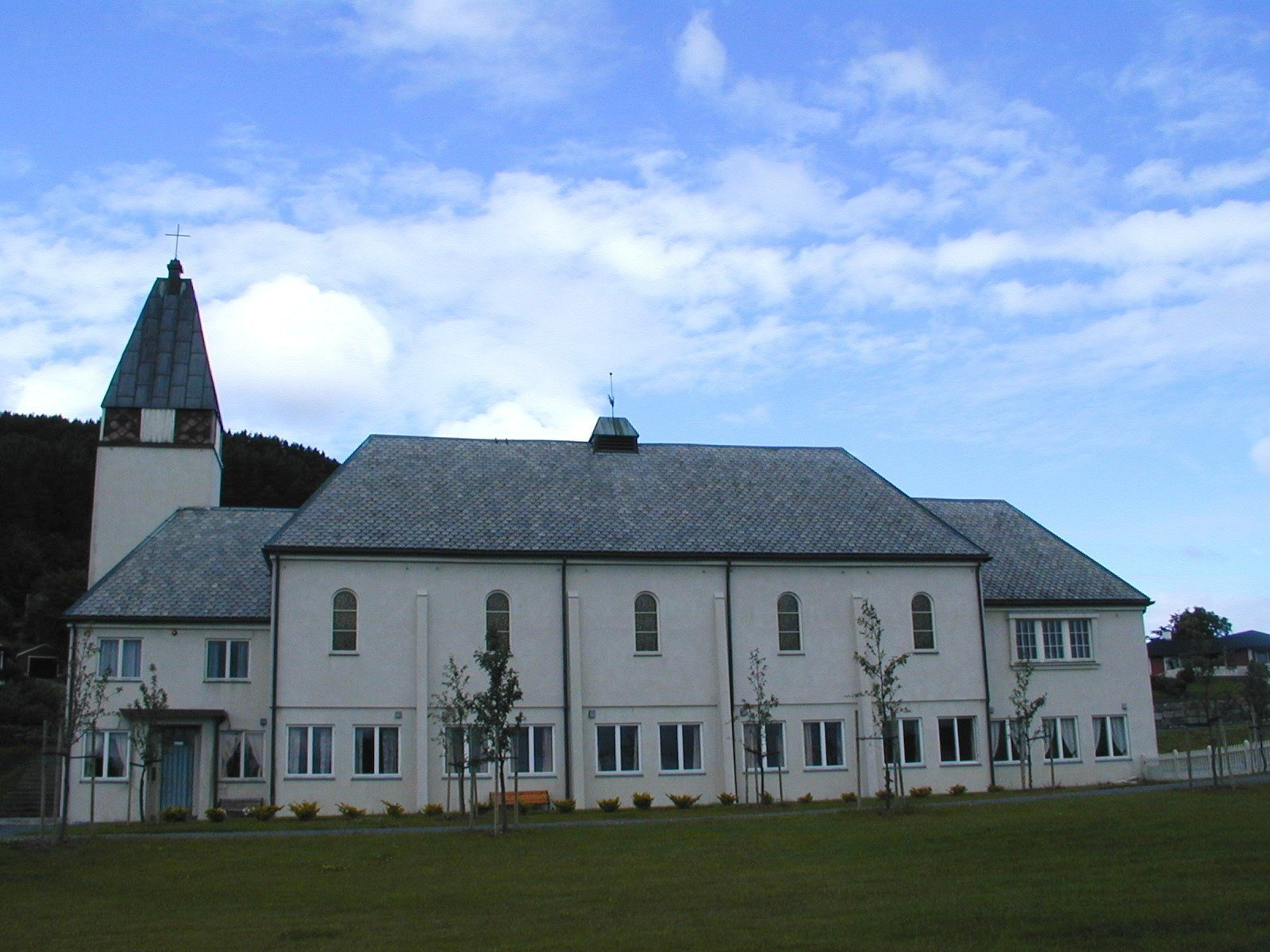
- View of the church
- Valderøy Church
- 62°30′12″N 6°07′49″E
- Location: Giske Municipality, Møre og Romsdal
- Country: Norway
- Denomination: Church of Norway
- Churchmanship: Evangelical Lutheran

History
- Status: Parish church
- Founded: 1961
- Consecrated: 29 July 1961

Architecture
- Functional status: Active
- Architect: Øyvind Grimnes
- Architectural type: Long church
- Completed: 1961 (65 years ago)

Specifications
- Capacity: 530
- Materials: Stone/brick

Administration
- Diocese: Møre bispedømme
- Deanery: Nordre Sunnmøre prosti
- Parish: Valderøy
- Norwegian Cultural Heritage Site
- Type: Church
- Status: Not protected
- ID: 85743

Valderøy Church (Norwegian: Valderøy kyrkje) is a parish church of the Church of Norway in Giske Municipality in Møre og Romsdal county, Norway. It is located on the south side of the village of Nordstrand on the island of Valderøya. It is the church for the Valderøy parish which is part of the Nordre Sunnmøre prosti (deanery) in the Diocese of Møre. The white, brick church was built in a long church design in 1961 using plans drawn up by the architect Øyvind B. Grimnes. The church seats about 530 people.

== History ==
A royal resolution was issued on 12 April 1957 that granted permission for building a church on Valderøya. Øyvind Berg Grimnes was hired to design the new church. Site work began on 18 September 1858 and on 29 July 1959 the foundation stone was laid. It was officially consecrated for use on 29 July 1961.

== See also ==
- List of churches in Møre
