= Kjell Furnes =

Norwegian politician

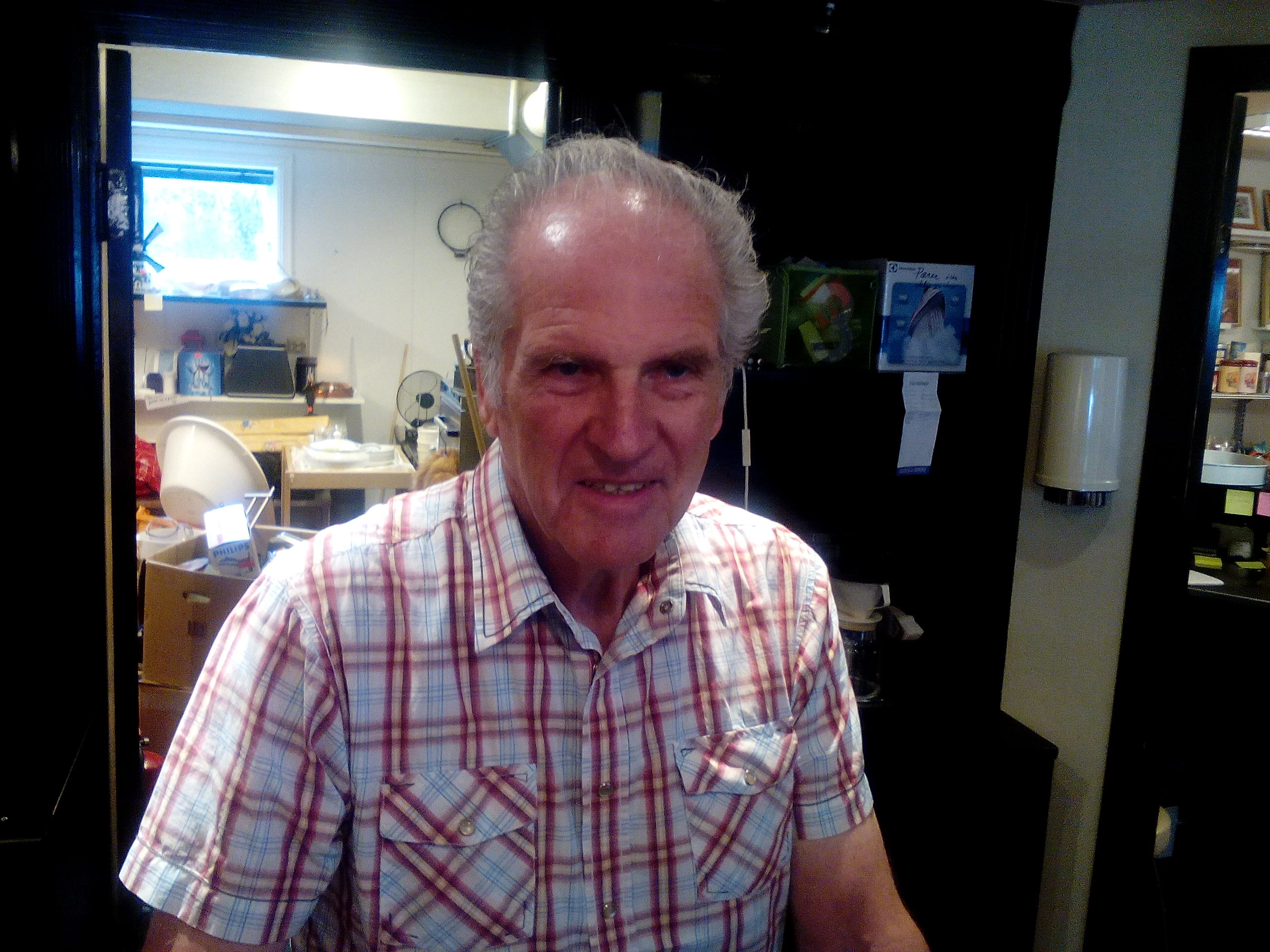
- Furnes in 2017
- Born: 21 June 1936 (age 89); Giske Municipality, Norway
- Occupation: Politician

Kjell Furnes (born 21 June 1936) is a Norwegian politician.

He was born in Giske Municipality to Hjalmar Furnes and Anna Martha Giskeødegård. He was elected representative to the Storting for the period 1985–1989 for the Christian Democratic Party.
