= Alnes =

Village in Giske Municipality, Norway

- Village
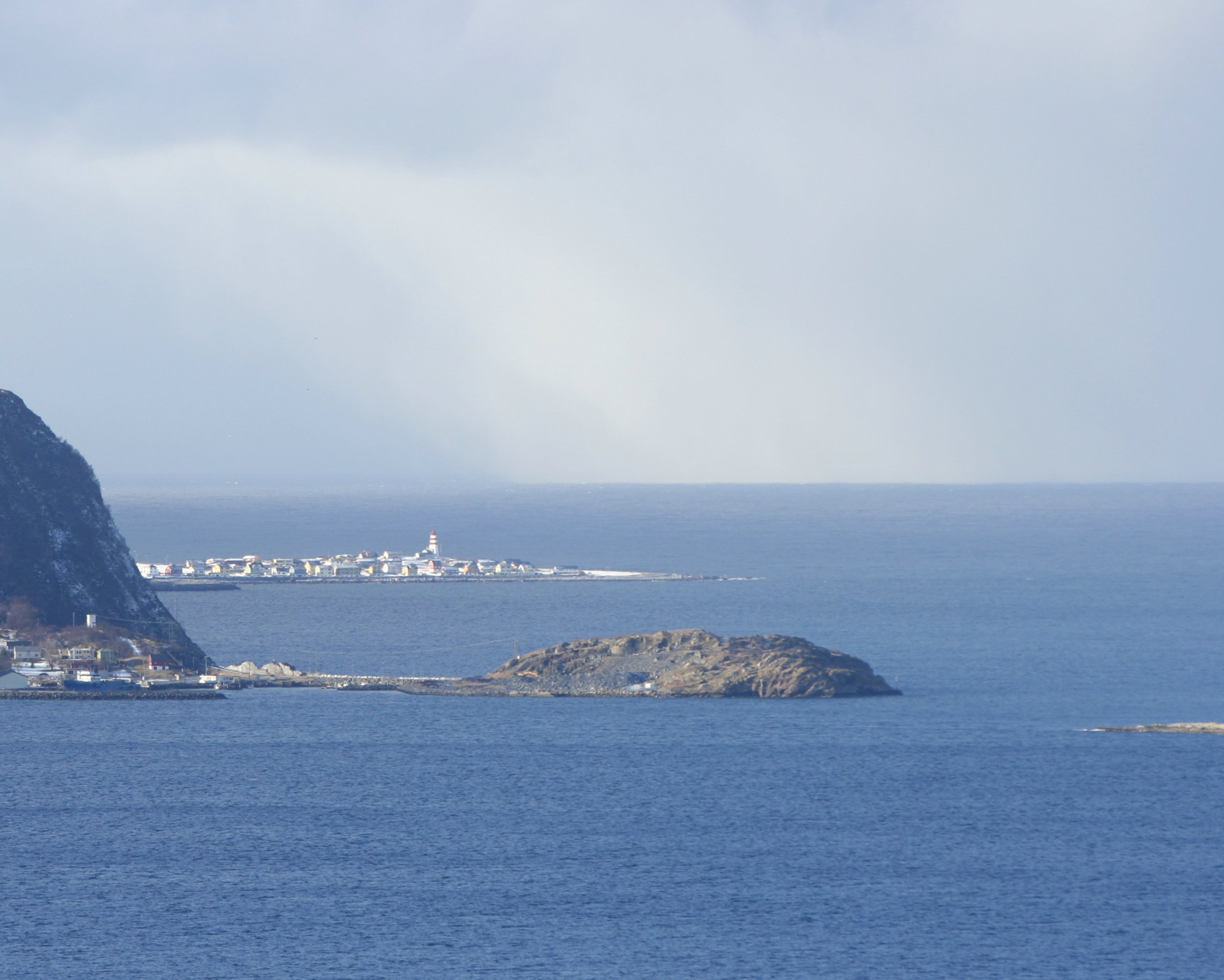
- Alnes on Godøya Island
- Interactive map of Alnes
- Location within Møre og Romsdal Location within Norway
- Coordinates: 62.4854°N 5.9755°E
- Country: Norway
- Region: Western Norway
- County: Møre og Romsdal
- District: Sunnmøre
- Municipality: Giske Municipality

Area
  - Total: 0.14 km^{2} (0.054 sq mi)
- Elevation: 3 m (9.8 ft)

Population (2006)
  - Total: 205
  - Density: 1,464/km^{2} (3,790/sq mi)
- Time zone: UTC+01:00 (CET)
  - Summer (DST): UTC+02:00 (CEST)
- Post Code: 6055 Godøya

Alnes is a small village in Giske Municipality in Møre og Romsdal county, Norway. It is located on the (isolated) north side of the island of Godøya, about 4 kilometres (2.5 mi) northwest of the village of Leitebakk. The rest of the island's population is located on the southern half of the island, separated from Alnes by a large mountain. Alnes is accessible through a tunnel through the mountainous center part of the island. It is possible to reach from Ålesund by city bus.

The predominant feature of the village is the Alnes Lighthouse which was built in 1876. The lighthouse is still in operation and it is accessible for tourists. It also houses an art gallery and a small historical museum. There is also the old road along the north coast of the island. The road is closed for car traffic (cyclists and walkers only). It has two tunnels of its own.

The 0.14-square-kilometre (35-acre) village had a population (2006) of 205 and a population density of 1,464 inhabitants per square kilometre (3,790/sq mi). Since 2006, the population of the village dropped below 200, so it is no longer considered an urban settlement, so the population and area data for this village area is no longer separately tracked by Statistics Norway.

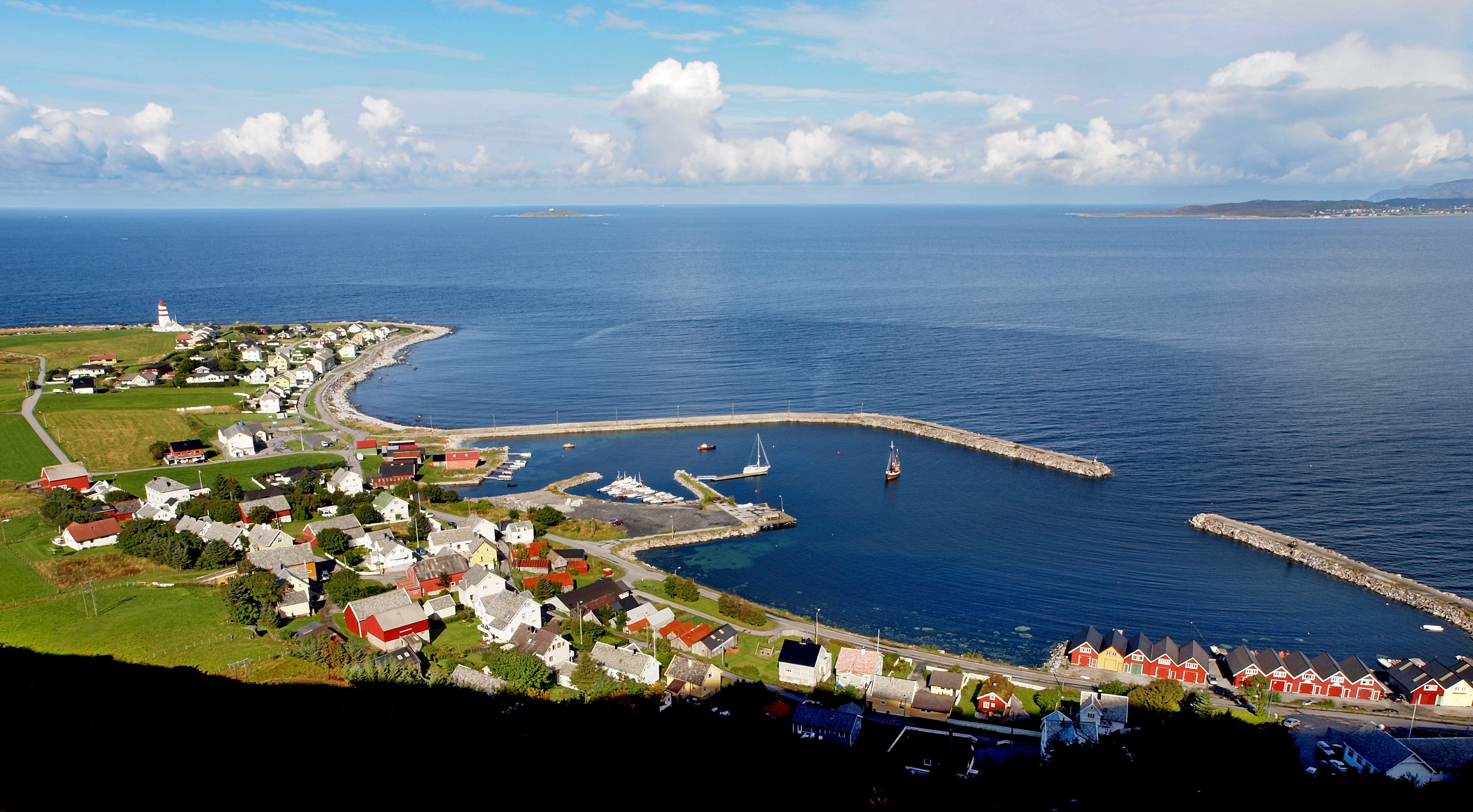
Alnes, Giske municipality, Møre og Romsdal county, Norway

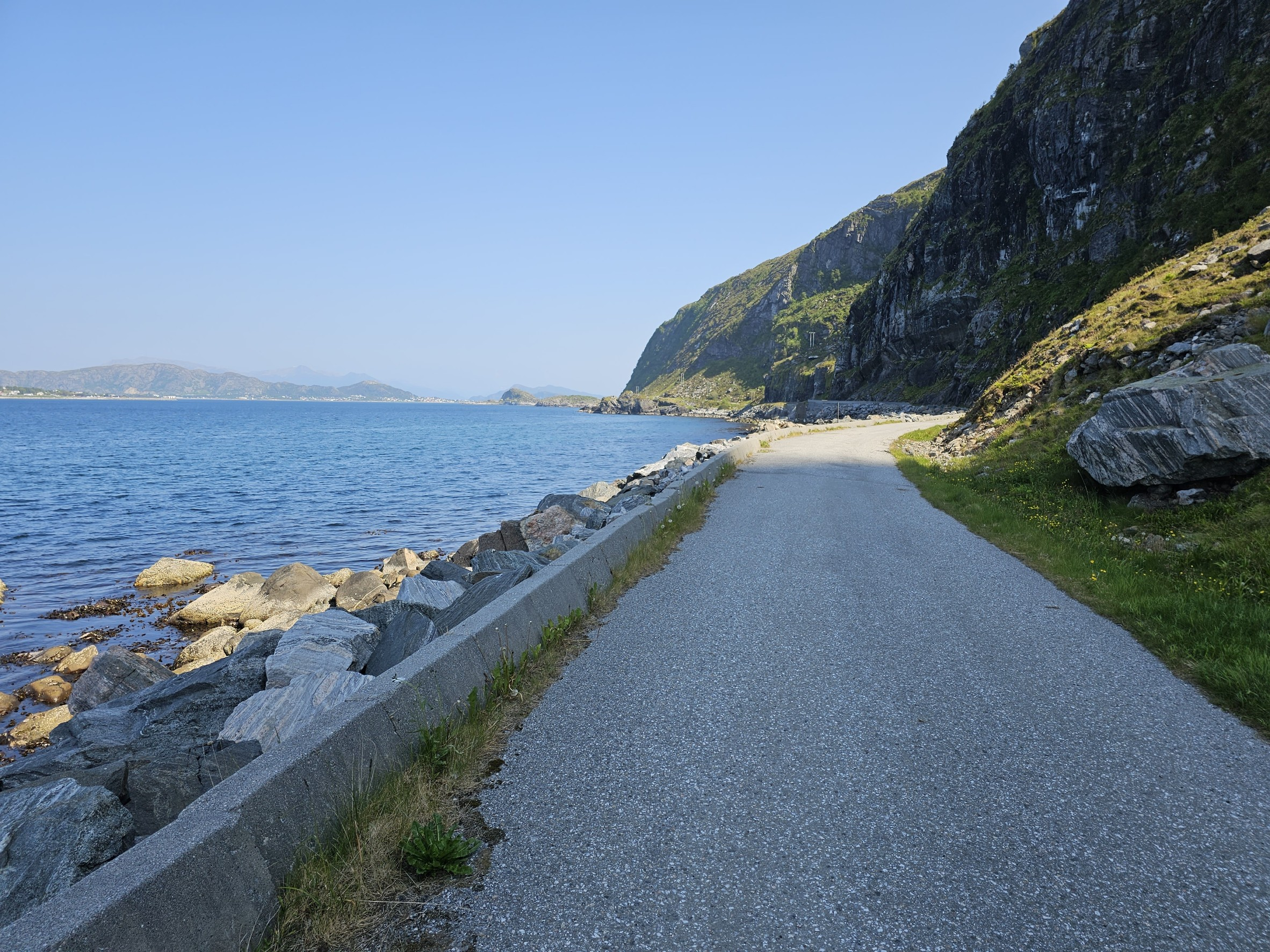
The old Alnes road
