= Godøya =

Island in Møre og Romsdal, Norway

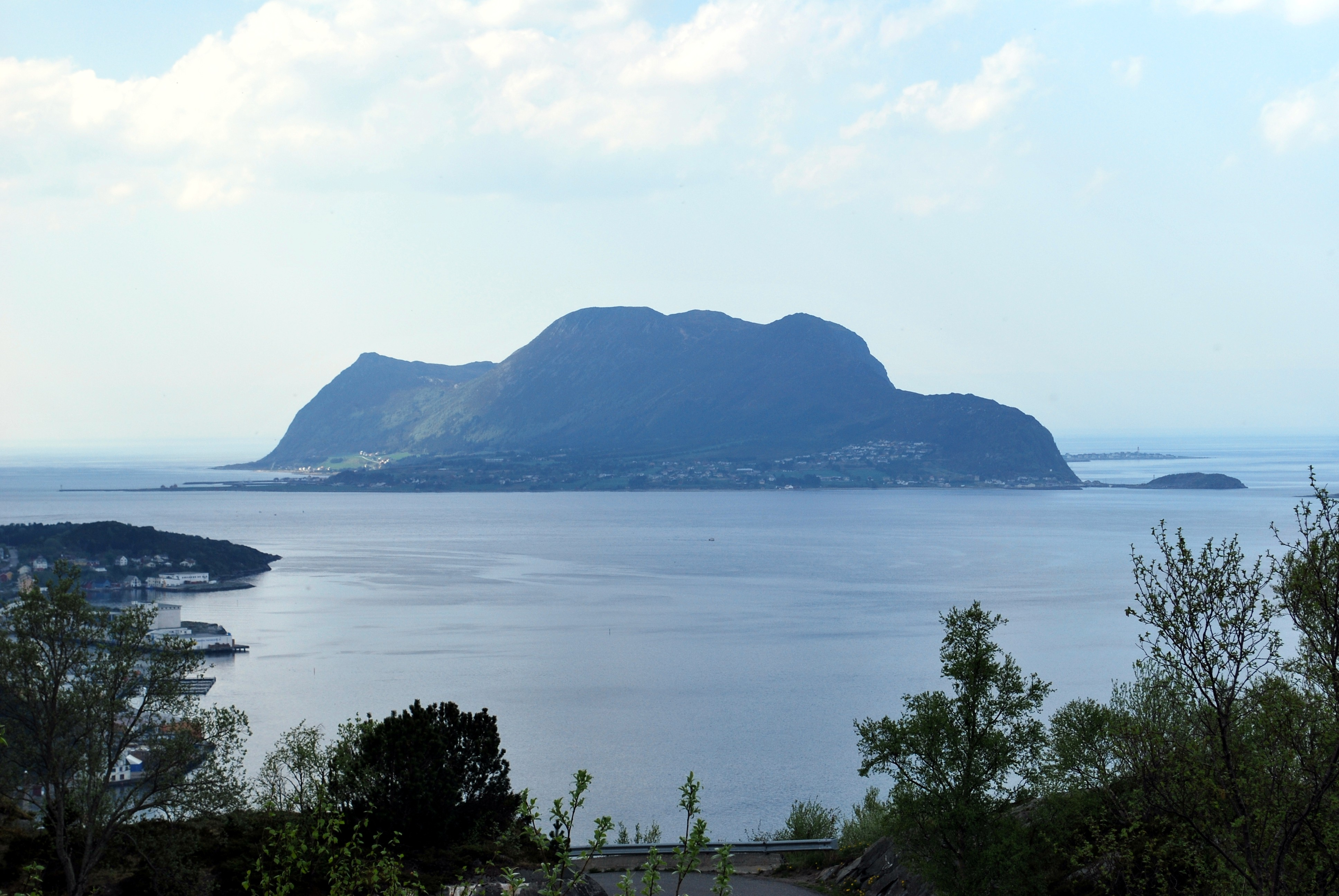
- View of Godøya
- Interactive map of Godøya

Geography
- Location: Møre og Romsdal, Norway
- Coordinates: 62.476394°N 6.040381°E
- Area: 10.9 km^{2} (4.2 sq mi)
- Length: 6 km (3.7 mi)
- Width: 3 km (1.9 mi)
- Coastline: 19.5 km (12.12 mi)
- Highest elevation: 497 m (1631 ft)
- Highest point: Storhornet

Administration
- Norway
- County: Møre og Romsdal
- Municipality: Giske Municipality

Demographics
- Population: 1151 (2019)
- Pop. density: 106/km^{2} (275/sq mi)

Godøya is an island in Giske Municipality in Møre og Romsdal county, Norway. The island is famous for its beautiful nature, dominated by the 497-metre (1,631 ft) tall mountain Storhornet and the large lake Alnesvatnet.

The 10.9-square-kilometre (4.2 sq mi) island had 1,151 residents in 2019. Most of the population lives on the southeastern side of the island in the villages of Godøy and Leitebakk, although the small fishing village of Alnes, with the old Alnes Lighthouse, is located on the north side of the island about 3 kilometres (1.9 mi) away via a tunnel through the 436-metre (1,430 ft) tall mountain Sloktinden. Godøy Chapel is located on the southern coast of the island.

There is a lot of cultivated farm land along the shores. Fishing and fish processing are the main industries for the island. There is an undersea tunnel, the Godøy Tunnel, which connects Godøya to the neighboring island of Giske. The tunnel was renovated in 2009. There is further ferry-free road transportation (including the Giske Bridge) that connects the island to the mainland and the town of Ålesund.

A variety of wildlife can be found on the island, mammals such as Red deer, Roe deer, Otter, Harbour seal and American mink are predominant. The steep mountain sides of the island also contain a number of nesting White-tailed eagles.

== Name ==
The name stems back to the Viking Age, and is derived from the name "Gud øy", which translates to "Island of God(s)" in English. The current name, Godøya, can be loosely translated to "the good island".

== See also ==
- List of islands of Norway
