= Giske Municipality =

Municipality in Møre og Romsdal, Norway

Giske Municipality Giske kommune
- Municipality
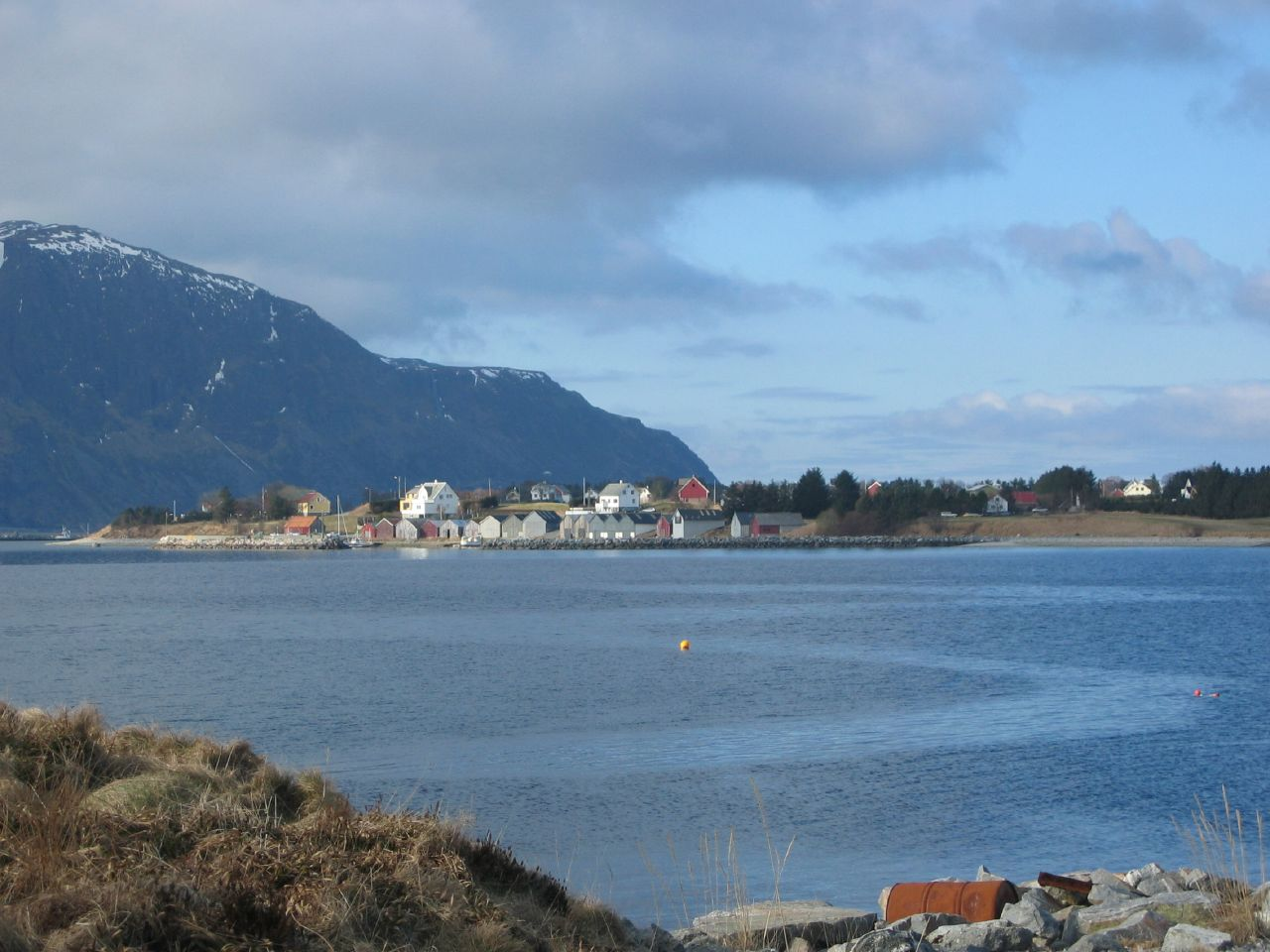
- View of Giske

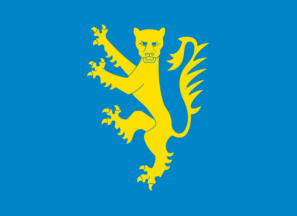
- Flag Coat of arms

- Møre og Romsdal within Norway

- Giske within Møre og Romsdal
- Coordinates: 62°33′45″N 06°06′07″E497.15
- Country: Norway
- County: Møre og Romsdal
- District: Sunnmøre
- Established: 1 Jan 1908
  - Preceded by: Borgund Municipality
- Administrative centre: Valderhaugstrand

Government
  - Mayor (2023): Kenneth Langvatn (H)

Area
  - Total: 40.58 km^{2} (15.67 sq mi)
  - Land: 39.92 km^{2} (15.41 sq mi)
  - Water: 0.66 km^{2} (0.25 sq mi) 1.6%
  - Rank: #350 in Norway
- Highest elevation: 497.15 m (1,631.1 ft)

Population (2025)
  - Total: 8,808
  - Rank: #126 in Norway
  - Density: 220/km^{2} (570/sq mi)
  - Change (10 years): ▲ +12.3%
- Demonym: Giske-folk

Official language
  - Norwegian form: Nynorsk
- Time zone: UTC+01:00 (CET)
  - Summer (DST): UTC+02:00 (CEST)
- ISO 3166 code: NO-1532
- Website: Official website

Giske is an island municipality in Møre og Romsdal county, Norway. The municipality lies north-northwest of the town of Ålesund in the traditional district of Sunnmøre. The municipal centre is Valderhaugstrand. Other population centres include the villages of Roald (on Vigra island) and Alnes and Leitebakk (both on Godøya island). The municipality is part of the Ålesund Region.

The 40.58-square-kilometre (15.67 sq mi) municipality is the 350th largest by area out of the 357 municipalities in Norway. Giske Municipality is the 126th most populous municipality in Norway with a population of 8,808. The municipality's population density is 220 inhabitants per square kilometre (570/sq mi) and its population has increased by 12.3% over the previous 10-year period.

== General information ==
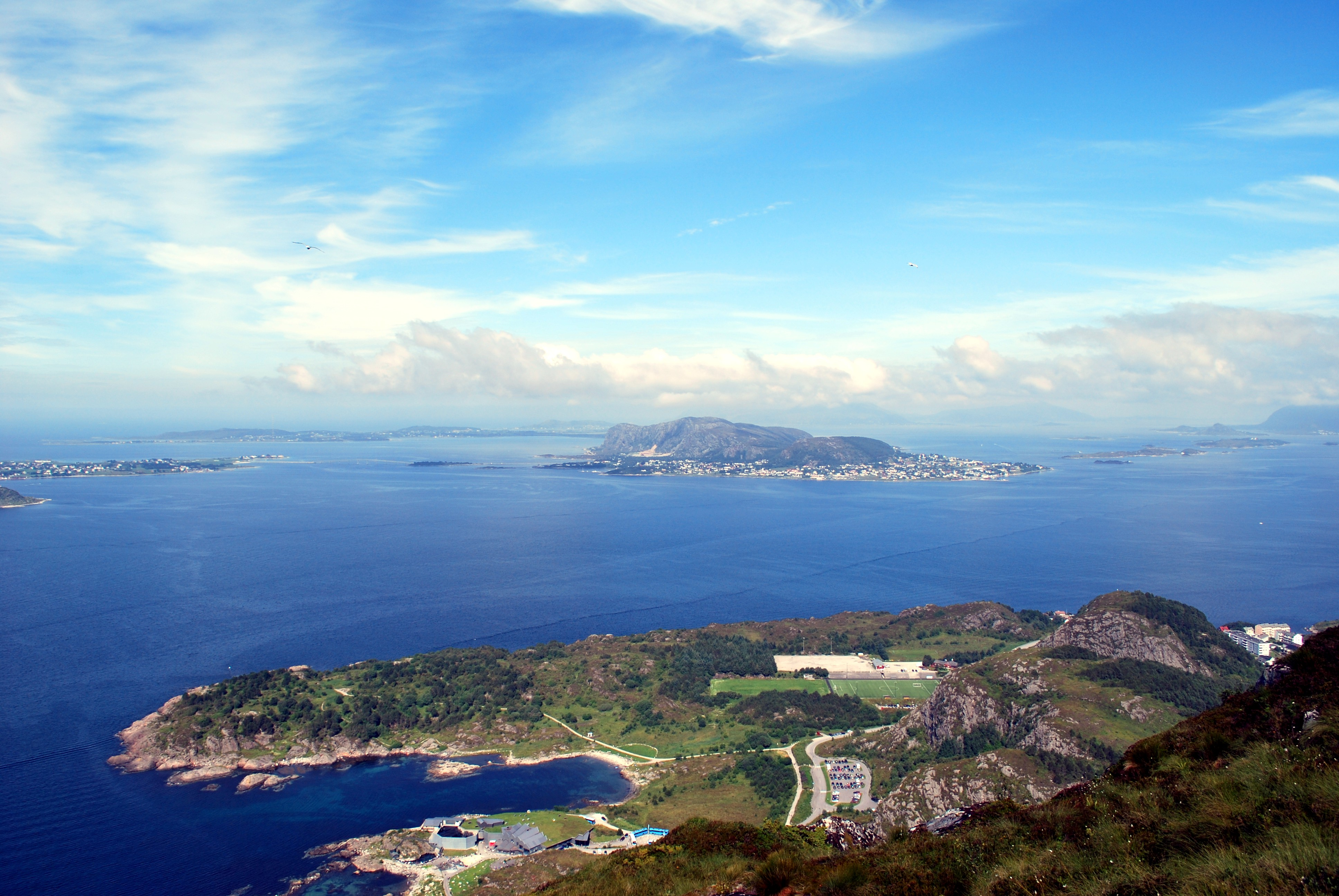
View of the islands of Giske

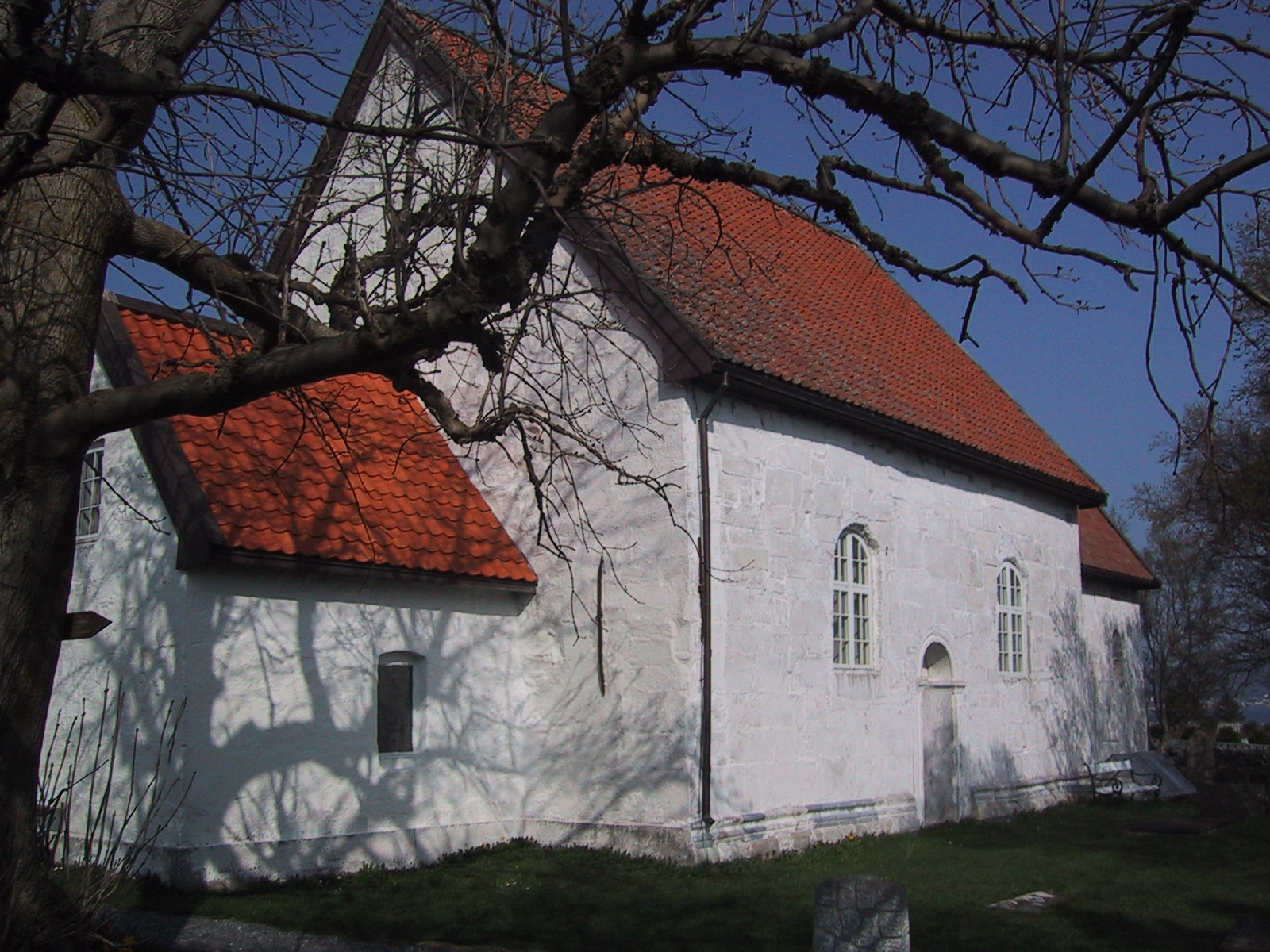
View of Giske Church

Giske Municipality was established on 1 January 1908 when it was separated from the large Borgund Municipality. The initial population of the new municipality was 1,708 and it included the islands of Valderøya, Godøya, and Giske. During the 1960s, there were many municipal mergers across Norway due to the work of the Schei Committee. Then on 1 January 1964, the neighbouring Vigra Municipality (including the island of Vigra) was merged into Giske Municipality. The newly enlarged municipality had a population of 4,644.

=== Name ===
The municipality is named after the Giske farm located on the island of Giske (Old Norse: Gizki), since the first Giske Church was built there. The name comes from the word gizki which means "tablecloth" or "rag" (maybe because the island is small and flat).

=== Coat of arms ===
The coat of arms was granted on 14 June 1985, but it has old roots. The official blazon is "Azure, a lion rampant guardant Or" (Norwegian: På blå grunn ei opprett leopardiset gull løve). This means the arms have a blue field (background) and the charge is a lion that is rampant (i.e. in walking position) and guardant (i.e. facing the viewer). The lion has a tincture of Or which means it is commonly colored yellow, but if it is made out of metal, then gold is used. The arms are based on the old seal of Erling Vidkunsson who was using the lion on his seal in 1355. His family was one of the most wealthy and influential families in the county, and had their origins and estate on Giske. The arms were designed by Jarle Skuseth. The municipal flag has the same design as the coat of arms.

=== Churches ===
The Church of Norway has three parishes (sokn) within Giske Municipality. It is part of the Nordre Sunnmøre prosti (deanery) in the Diocese of Møre.

Churches in Giske Municipality
Parish (sokn)	Church name	Location of the church	Year built
Giske	Giske Church	Giske	1170
Giske	Godøy Chapel	Geilevika on Godøya	1953
Valderøy	Valderøy Church	Nordstrand	1961
Vigra	Vigra Church	Vigra	1894

=== Recording Studio ===
Giske Harbor Hall (Øygardshallen) is an internationally renowned, purpose-built recording studio located on the shore of a former harbor on the island of Giske. It looks like an old boathouse and also operates as a concert hall. The British band New Model Army recorded its album "From Here" (2019) in this special recording studio.

== Government ==
Giske Municipality is responsible for primary education (through 10th grade), outpatient health services, senior citizen services, welfare and other social services, zoning, economic development, and municipal roads and utilities. The municipality is governed by a municipal council of directly elected representatives. The mayor is indirectly elected by a vote of the municipal council. The municipality is under the jurisdiction of the Sunnmøre District Court and the Frostating Court of Appeal.

=== Municipal council ===
The municipal council (Kommunestyre) of Giske Municipality is made up of 23 representatives that are elected to four year terms. Interestingly, in the 2007 municipal elections, Giske recorded the highest vote for the Christian Democratic Party in all of Norway at 43.2 percent. The tables below show the current and historical composition of the council by political party.

Giske kommunestyre 2023–2027
Party name (in Nynorsk)	Number of representatives
Labour Party (Arbeidarpartiet)	2
Progress Party (Framstegspartiet)	4
Green Party (Miljøpartiet Dei Grøne)	1
Conservative Party (Høgre)	4
Industry and Business Party (Industri‑ og Næringspartiet)	1
Christian Democratic Party (Kristeleg Folkeparti)	5
Centre Party (Senterpartiet)	2
Liberal Party (Venstre)	2
Cross-party list for Giske (Tverrpolitisk liste for Giske)	2
Total number of members:	23

Giske kommunestyre 2019–2023
Party name (in Nynorsk)	Number of representatives
Labour Party (Arbeidarpartiet)	3
Progress Party (Framstegspartiet)	2
Conservative Party (Høgre)	4
Christian Democratic Party (Kristeleg Folkeparti)	6
Centre Party (Senterpartiet)	3
Liberal Party (Venstre)	2
Cross-party list for Giske (Tverrpolitisk liste for Giske)	3
Total number of members:	23

Giske kommunestyre 2015–2019
Party name (in Nynorsk)	Number of representatives
Labour Party (Arbeidarpartiet)	4
Progress Party (Framstegspartiet)	2
Conservative Party (Høgre)	3
Christian Democratic Party (Kristeleg Folkeparti)	6
Centre Party (Senterpartiet)	1
Liberal Party (Venstre)	4
Cross-party list for Giske (Tverrpolitisk liste for Giske)	3
Total number of members:	23

Giske kommunestyre 2011–2015
Party name (in Nynorsk)	Number of representatives
Labour Party (Arbeidarpartiet)	3
Progress Party (Framstegspartiet)	2
Conservative Party (Høgre)	5
Christian Democratic Party (Kristeleg Folkeparti)	8
Centre Party (Senterpartiet)	1
Liberal Party (Venstre)	4
Total number of members:	23

Giske kommunestyre 2007–2011
Party name (in Nynorsk)	Number of representatives
Labour Party (Arbeidarpartiet)	2
Progress Party (Framstegspartiet)	3
Conservative Party (Høgre)	4
Christian Democratic Party (Kristeleg Folkeparti)	10
Centre Party (Senterpartiet)	1
Liberal Party (Venstre)	3
Total number of members:	23

Giske kommunestyre 2003–2007
Party name (in Nynorsk)	Number of representatives
Labour Party (Arbeidarpartiet)	3
Progress Party (Framstegspartiet)	5
Conservative Party (Høgre)	3
Christian Democratic Party (Kristeleg Folkeparti)	6
Centre Party (Senterpartiet)	2
Liberal Party (Venstre)	4
Total number of members:	23

Giske kommunestyre 1999–2003
Party name (in Nynorsk)	Number of representatives
Labour Party (Arbeidarpartiet)	2
Progress Party (Framstegspartiet)	4
Conservative Party (Høgre)	7
Christian Democratic Party (Kristeleg Folkeparti)	7
Centre Party (Senterpartiet)	3
Liberal Party (Venstre)	4
Total number of members:	27

Giske kommunestyre 1995–1999
Party name (in Nynorsk)	Number of representatives
Labour Party (Arbeidarpartiet)	5
Conservative Party (Høgre)	5
Christian Democratic Party (Kristeleg Folkeparti)	7
Centre Party (Senterpartiet)	6
Liberal Party (Venstre)	4
Total number of members:	27

Giske kommunestyre 1991–1995
Party name (in Nynorsk)	Number of representatives
Labour Party (Arbeidarpartiet)	4
Progress Party (Framstegspartiet)	1
Conservative Party (Høgre)	7
Christian Democratic Party (Kristeleg Folkeparti)	7
Centre Party (Senterpartiet)	6
Liberal Party (Venstre)	2
Total number of members:	27

Giske kommunestyre 1987–1991
Party name (in Nynorsk)	Number of representatives
Labour Party (Arbeidarpartiet)	6
Conservative Party (Høgre)	8
Christian Democratic Party (Kristeleg Folkeparti)	7
Centre Party (Senterpartiet)	5
Liberal Party (Venstre)	1
Total number of members:	27

Giske kommunestyre 1983–1987
Party name (in Nynorsk)	Number of representatives
Labour Party (Arbeidarpartiet)	6
Conservative Party (Høgre)	7
Christian Democratic Party (Kristeleg Folkeparti)	8
Centre Party (Senterpartiet)	5
Liberal Party (Venstre)	1
Total number of members:	27

Giske kommunestyre 1979–1983
Party name (in Nynorsk)	Number of representatives
Labour Party (Arbeidarpartiet)	4
Conservative Party (Høgre)	9
Christian Democratic Party (Kristeleg Folkeparti)	8
Centre Party (Senterpartiet)	4
Liberal Party (Venstre)	2
Total number of members:	27

Giske kommunestyre 1975–1979
Party name (in Nynorsk)	Number of representatives
Labour Party (Arbeidarpartiet)	4
Conservative Party (Høgre)	4
Christian Democratic Party (Kristeleg Folkeparti)	11
Centre Party (Senterpartiet)	6
Liberal Party (Venstre)	2
Total number of members:	27

Giske kommunestyre 1971–1975
Party name (in Nynorsk)	Number of representatives
Labour Party (Arbeidarpartiet)	5
Conservative Party (Høgre)	2
Christian Democratic Party (Kristeleg Folkeparti)	9
Centre Party (Senterpartiet)	7
Liberal Party (Venstre)	3
Local List(s) (Lokale lister)	2
Total number of members:	27

Giske kommunestyre 1967–1971
Party name (in Nynorsk)	Number of representatives
Labour Party (Arbeidarpartiet)	5
Conservative Party (Høgre)	3
Christian Democratic Party (Kristeleg Folkeparti)	10
Centre Party (Senterpartiet)	4
Liberal Party (Venstre)	5
Total number of members:	27

Giske kommunestyre 1963–1967
Party name (in Nynorsk)	Number of representatives
Labour Party (Arbeidarpartiet)	2
Local List(s) (Lokale lister)	25
Total number of members:	27
Note: On 1 January 1964, Vigra Municipality became part of Giske Municipality.

Giske heradsstyre 1959–1963
Party name (in Nynorsk)	Number of representatives
Local List(s) (Lokale lister)	13
Total number of members:	13

Giske heradsstyre 1955–1959
Party name (in Nynorsk)	Number of representatives
Local List(s) (Lokale lister)	13
Total number of members:	13

Giske heradsstyre 1951–1955
Party name (in Nynorsk)	Number of representatives
Local List(s) (Lokale lister)	12
Total number of members:	12

Giske heradsstyre 1947–1951
Party name (in Nynorsk)	Number of representatives
Local List(s) (Lokale lister)	12
Total number of members:	12

Giske heradsstyre 1945–1947
Party name (in Nynorsk)	Number of representatives
Local List(s) (Lokale lister)	12
Total number of members:	12

Giske heradsstyre 1937–1941*
Party name (in Nynorsk)	Number of representatives
Local List(s) (Lokale lister)	12
Total number of members:	12
Note: Due to the German occupation of Norway during World War II, no elections were held for new municipal councils until after the war ended in 1945.

=== Mayors ===
The mayor (Nynorsk: ordførar) of Giske Municipality is the political leader of the municipality and the chairperson of the municipal council. Here is a list of people who have held this position:

- 1908–1916: O.E. Petersen
- 1917–1919: Knut E. Valderhaug
- 1919–1923: Nils Giskeødegard
- 1923–1934: Andreas O. Godøy
- 1934–1942: Peder Giske
- 1942–1944: Karl K. Giskegjerde
- 1945–1951: Karl K. Ytterland
- 1951–1963: Lars L. Godøy
- 1963–1967: Karl O. Blindheim (LL)
- 1967–1971: Jens Mulelid (V)
- 1971–1975: Kjell Furnes (KrF)
- 1975–1983: Noralf Støbakk (KrF)
- 1983–1987: Elias Kaare Giske (Sp)
- 1987–1995: Harald Hole (H)
- 1995–1999: Karin Kalvø Giske (Sp)
- 1999–2003: Ruth Roald (H)
- 2003–2015: Knut Støbakk (KrF)
- 2015–2023: Harry Valderhaug (KrF)
- 2023–present: Kenneth Langvatn (H)

== Geography ==
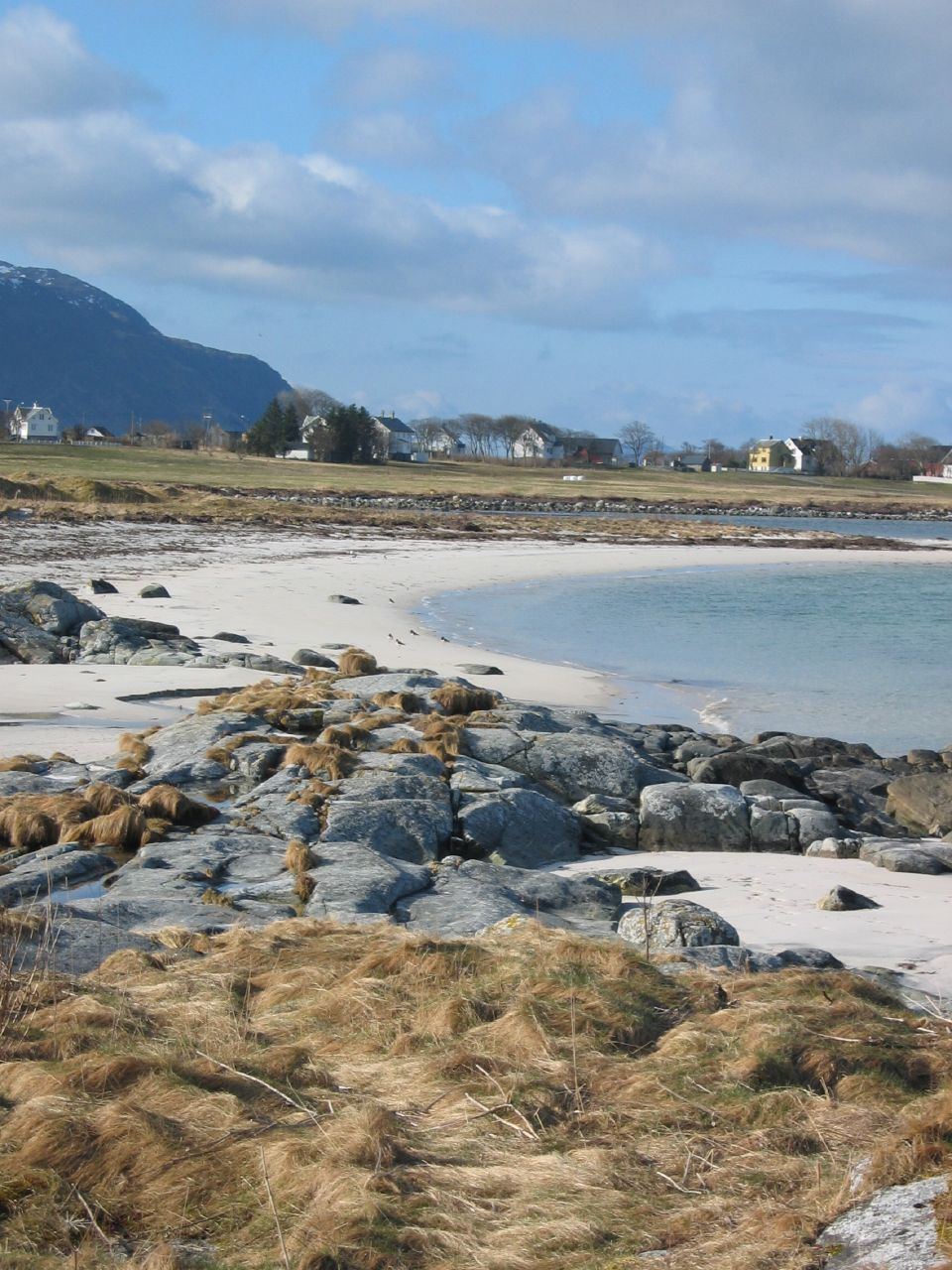
A beach in Giske on Giske island

The municipality is composed of four main islands: Giske, which gives its name to the municipality because of its historical importance, Vigra, which is where Ålesund's airport is located, Valderøya, where the municipal administration is located, and Godøya. There are also many smaller islands within its boundaries. The Alnes Lighthouse, Erkna Lighthouse, and Storholmen lighthouse are all located on islands in the municipality. The highest point in the municipality is the 497.15-metre (1,631.1 ft) tall mountain Storhornet on the island of Godøya.

The main islands are all connected to the mainland of Norway by a network of tunnels and bridges. Godøy Tunnel connects Godøya to the island of Giske. Giske Bridge connects the island of Giske and Valderøya. A causeway connects the island of Vigra and Valderøya. All islands are connected to Valderøya which is where the main Valderøy Tunnel connects the whole municipality to the island of Ellingsøya in Ålesund Municipality. Finally, the Ellingsøy Tunnel connects that island to the town of Ålesund.

== Climate ==
Giske is situated at the coast and has a temperate oceanic climate (Cfb) with very mild winters for the latitude, sometimes with strong winds in winter and late autumn. All-time high is 30 °C (86 °F) recorded 28 July 2018, while the all-time low is −11.9 °C (10.6 °F) recorded January 2016. Winter lows rarely go below −8 °C (18 °F). Coldest month on record was February 1966 with mean −1.5 °C (29.3 °F), warmest month was August 2003 with mean 16.9 °C (62.4 °F). Ålesund Airport Vigra in Giske has been recording since July 1958.

Climate data for Ålesund Airport Vigra 1991-2020 (22 m)
Month	Jan	Feb	Mar	Apr	May	Jun	Jul	Aug	Sep	Oct	Nov	Dec	Year
Mean daily maximum °C (°F)	5.2 (41.4)	4.8 (40.6)	5.9 (42.6)	8.8 (47.8)	11.7 (53.1)	14.2 (57.6)	16.5 (61.7)	16.9 (62.4)	14.7 (58.5)	10.9 (51.6)	7.8 (46.0)	5.8 (42.4)	10.3 (50.5)
Daily mean °C (°F)	3.4 (38.1)	2.8 (37.0)	3.6 (38.5)	5.9 (42.6)	8.7 (47.7)	11.4 (52.5)	13.7 (56.7)	14.3 (57.7)	12.2 (54.0)	8.6 (47.5)	5.9 (42.6)	4 (39)	7.9 (46.2)
Mean daily minimum °C (°F)	1.3 (34.3)	0.7 (33.3)	1.3 (34.3)	3.3 (37.9)	6.1 (43.0)	9.1 (48.4)	11.5 (52.7)	12.1 (53.8)	9.8 (49.6)	6.3 (43.3)	3.8 (38.8)	1.8 (35.2)	5.6 (42.1)
Average precipitation mm (inches)	145.8 (5.74)	125.2 (4.93)	121.5 (4.78)	76.1 (3.00)	71.6 (2.82)	80.1 (3.15)	81.1 (3.19)	125.3 (4.93)	142.9 (5.63)	161.7 (6.37)	146.6 (5.77)	165.5 (6.52)	1,443.4 (56.83)
Average precipitation days (≥ 1.0 mm)	18	17	16	13	12	13	12	16	17	19	17	20	190
Source 1: yr.no
Source 2: NOAA - WMO averages 91-2020 Norway

== History ==
Giske is the site of Mjelthaugen, an ancient burial place dating from the Bronze Age. The site was the location of excavations in 1847, 1867 and 1878. Giske is also the place where, according to Snorre Sturlason, Harald Fairhair had his hair cut after uniting Norway. The historic Giske Church is also located on the island of Giske.

== Notable people ==
- Tora Torbergsdatter (born 1025 on Giske – ca.1066), a Norwegian royal consort and the mother of two kings of Norway
- Peggy Hessen Følsvik (born 1960 in Vigra), a trade unionist
- Marianne Synnes (born 1970 in Vigra), a medical laboratory scientist, molecular biologist, and politician
