= Erkna Lighthouse =

Coastal lighthouse in Møre og Romsdal, Norway

Erkna Lighthouse Erkna fyr
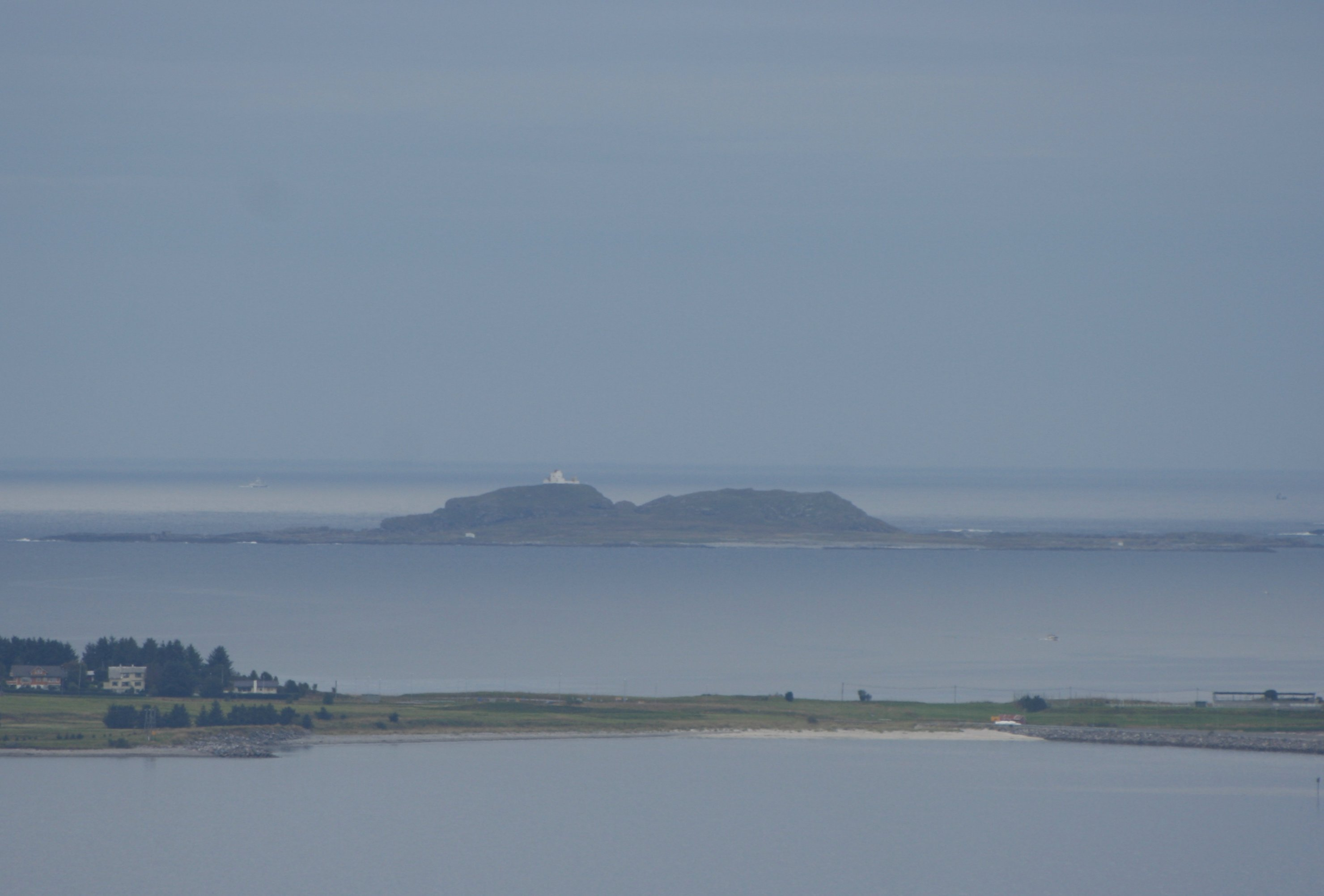
- Erkna Lighthouse
- Location: Giske Municipality, Møre og Romsdal, Norway
- Coordinates: 62°33′01″N 5°56′22.7″E

Tower
- Constructed: 1869
- Construction: concrete tower
- Automated: 1988
- Height: 10 m (33 ft)
- Shape: square parallelepiped tower with lantern
- Markings: white tower, red lantern
- Heritage: heritage site

Light
- First lit: 1950
- Deactivated: 1945
- Focal height: 49 m (161 ft)
- Intensity: 40,500 cd
- Range: 17 nmi (31 km; 20 mi) (white), 14 nmi (26 km; 16 mi) (red), 13 nmi (24 km; 15 mi) (green)
- Characteristic: Fl(3) WRG 10s

Erkna Lighthouse (Norwegian: Erkna fyr) is a coastal lighthouse located in Giske Municipality in Møre og Romsdal county, Norway. It was established in 1869, and automated in 1988.

== See also ==
- List of lighthouses in Norway
- Lighthouses in Norway
