= Alnes Lighthouse =

Alnes lighthouse Alnes fyr
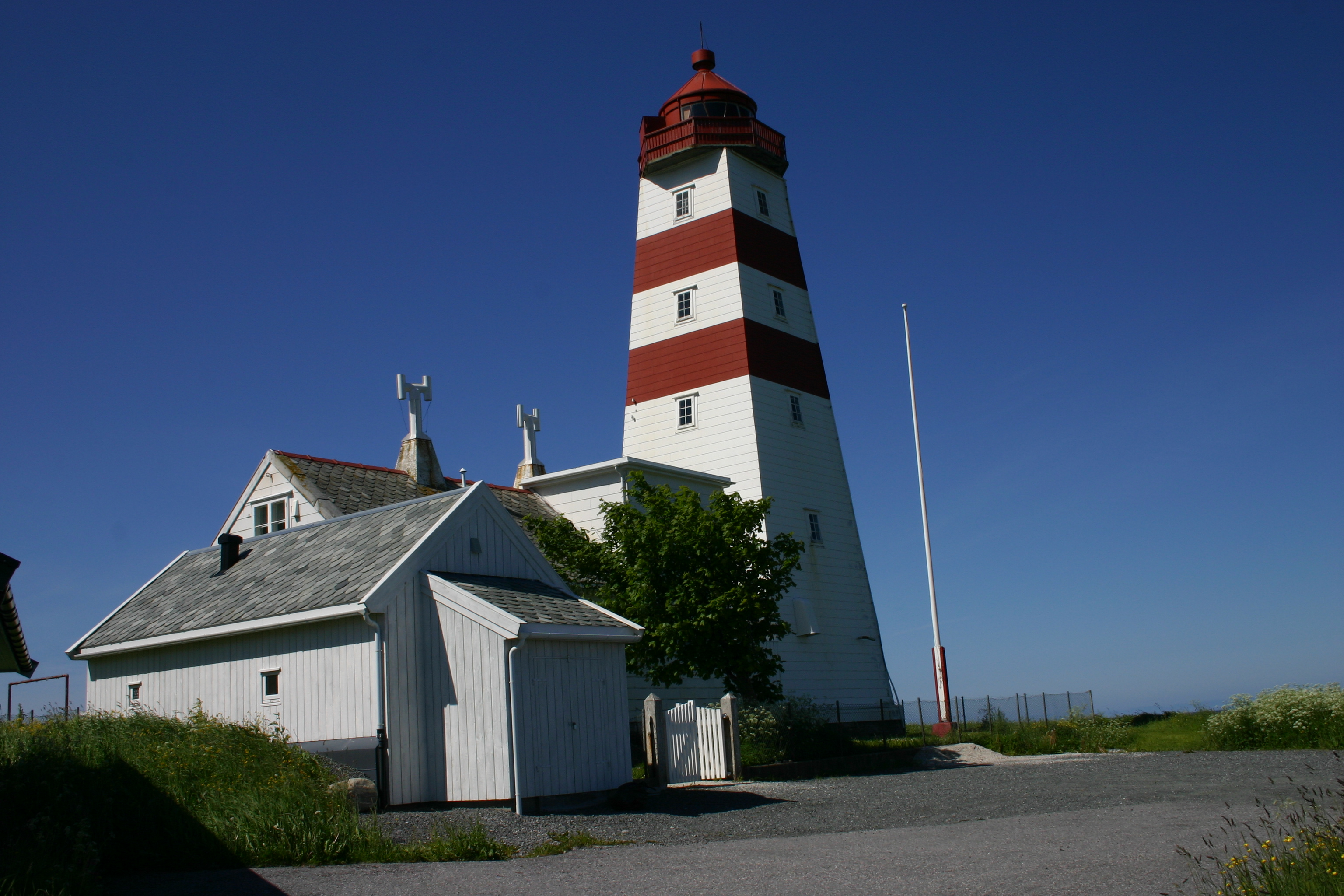
- Alnes lighthouse on the island of Godøya in Giske Municipality
- Location: Alnes, Giske Municipality, Norway
- Coordinates: 62°29′23.8″N 05°58′02.0″E

Tower
- Constructed: 1853
- Construction: wooden tower
- Automated: 1982
- Height: 22.5 m (74 ft)
- Shape: square tower with balcony and lantern
- Markings: white tower with two horizontal red bands, white balcony, red lantern
- Power source: mains electricity
- Heritage: cultural heritage preservation in Norway

Light
- First lit: 1876
- Focal height: 36 m (118 ft)
- Intensity: 25,900 cd
- Range: 16 nmi (30 km; 18 mi) (white), 13 nmi (24 km; 15 mi) (red), 12 nmi (22 km; 14 mi) (green)
- Characteristic: Oc(2) WRG 8s

Alnes Lighthouse (Norwegian: Alnes fyrstasjon) was established in 1852 to guide fishing boats safely to the harbor of the small fishing community of Alnes on the north side of the island of Godøya in Giske Municipality in Møre og Romsdal county, Norway. The lighthouse sits about 4 kilometres (2.5 mi) northwest of Leitebakk.

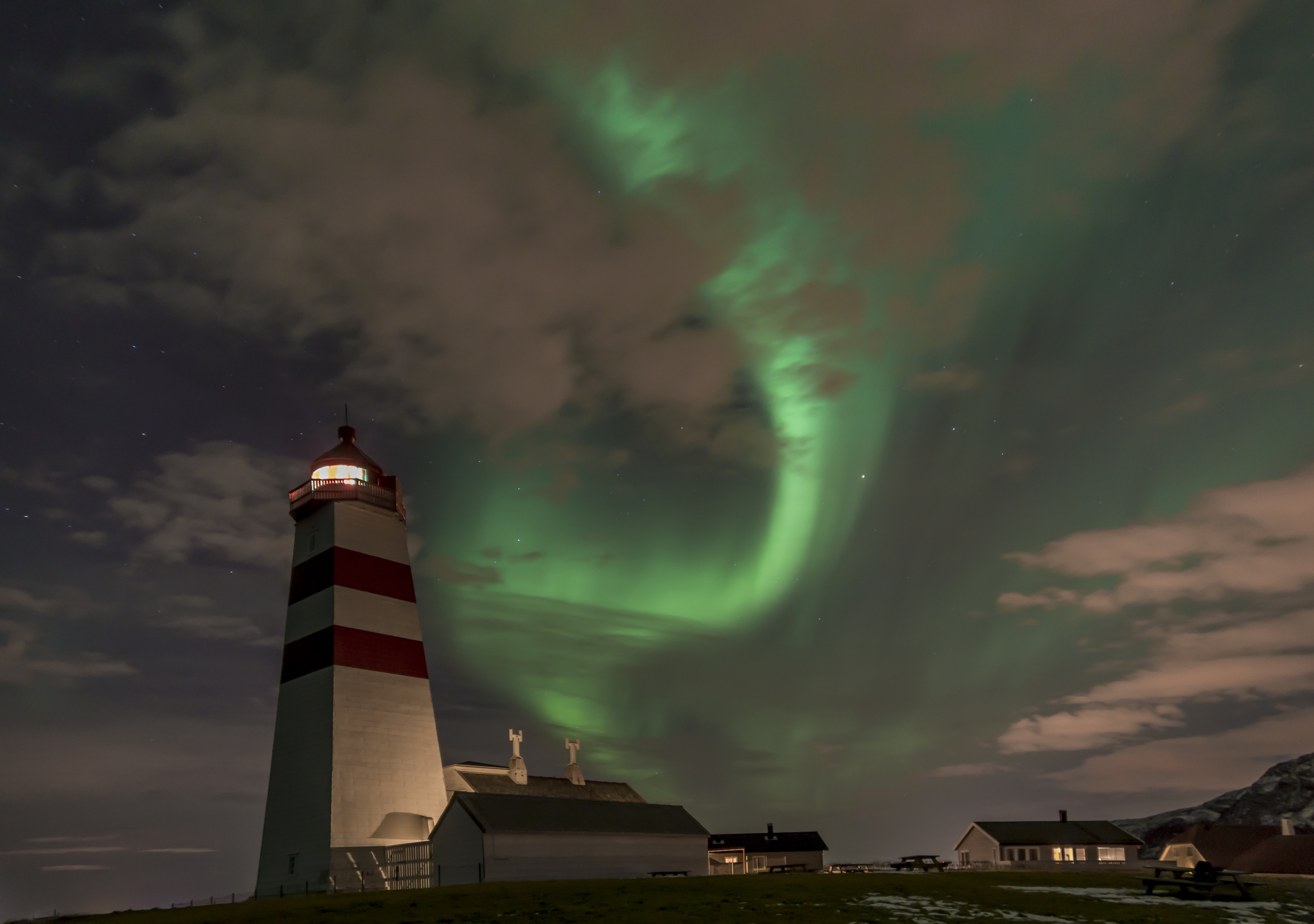
Alnes lighthouse with northern lights

== History ==
The current lighthouse was built in 1876 and is still in operation with a few modifications. The lighthouse was automated in 1982 and is now owned by Giske Municipality.

The galley and the tower are open for tourists from May through October, and the old keeper's house has a café and an exhibition hall where artwork from local artists are displayed. There is also a small historical museum inside the lighthouse tower. Only a 30-minute drive from Ålesund, it is easily accessible for visitors and is one of the most visited lighthouses in Norway.

== See also ==
- List of lighthouses in Norway
- Lighthouses in Norway
