= Storholmen Lighthouse =

Storholmen Lighthouse Storholmen fyr
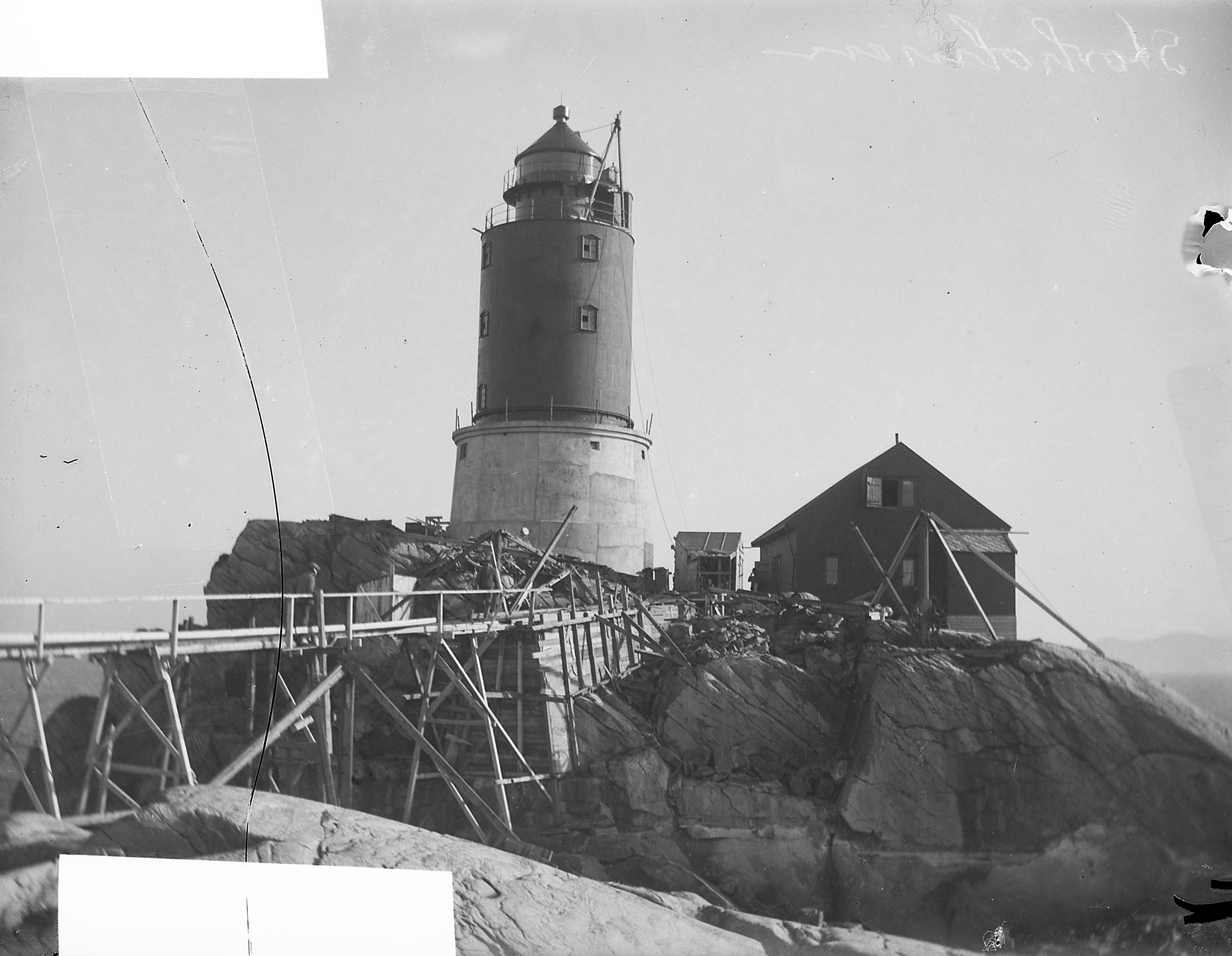
- Location: Giske Municipality, Møre og Romsdal, Norway
- Coordinates: 62°38′34″N 05°55′25″E

Tower
- Constructed: 1920
- Foundation: concrete base
- Construction: cast iron tower
- Height: 22 m (72 ft)
- Shape: cylindrical tower with balcony and lantern
- Markings: white base, red tower with an orange lower band
- Heritage: heritage site

Light
- First lit: 1920
- Focal height: 36 m (118 ft)
- Intensity: 58800 cd
- Range: 17 nmi (31 km; 20 mi)
- Characteristic: Oc WRG

Storholmen Lighthouse (Norwegian: Storholmen fyr) is an active lighthouse in Giske Municipality in Møre og Romsdal county on the west coast of Norway. This remote lighthouse is located on a tiny skerry about 6 kilometres (3.7 mi) due north of the tiny island of Erkna and 8 kilometres (5.0 mi) northwest of the populated island of Vigra. The light is lit from 16 July until 21 May. It is not lit during the summer because it is unnecessary due to the midnight sun.

The lighthouse was only accessible by boat in calm seas during the summer, since boats cannot land on the tiny island. Goods and people had to be hoisted onto the island from the sea. From 1970 and until the lighthouse was automated in 1980, transport to the lighthouse was done by helicopter. The narrow 4-by-4-metre (13 ft × 13 ft) landing pad could only be used by very experienced pilots.

== See also ==
- List of lighthouses in Norway
- Lighthouses in Norway
