= Nordstrand, Møre og Romsdal =

Village in Giske Municipality, Norway

Nordstranda Nordstrand
- Village
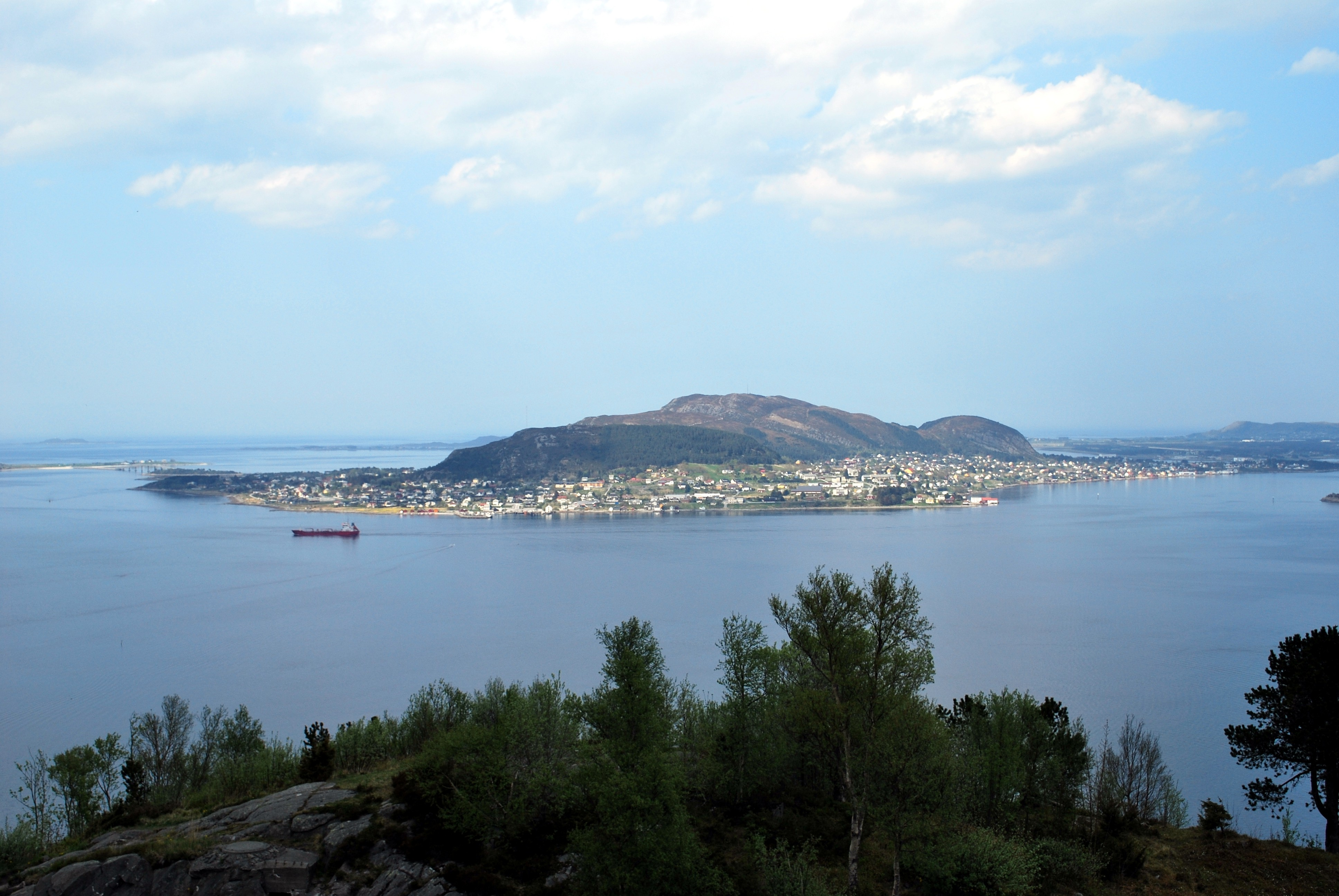
- View of southern parts of Valderøya with Skjong and the administrative center Valderhaugstrand in the foreground. Nordstrand is located on the north-east side of the island (distant right side of the photo).
- Interactive map of Nordstranda
- Location within Møre og Romsdal Location within Norway
- Coordinates: 62.5138°N 6.1316°E
- Country: Norway
- Region: Western Norway
- County: Møre og Romsdal
- District: Sunnmøre
- Municipality: Giske Municipality

Area
  - Total: 2.63 km^{2} (1.02 sq mi)
- Elevation: 10 m (33 ft)

Population (2024)
  - Total: 4,317
  - Density: 1,641/km^{2} (4,250/sq mi)
- Time zone: UTC+01:00 (CET)
  - Summer (DST): UTC+02:00 (CEST)
- Post Code: 6050 Valderøya

Nordstranda or Nordstrand is a little village area in Giske Municipality in Møre og Romsdal county, Norway. The village is located on the east side of the island of Valderøya. The administrative center of Giske Municipality is Valderhaugstrand, an area on the south side of the island that (according to Statistics Norway) is part of the Nordstrand urban area.

The 2.63-square-kilometre (650-acre) village has a population (2024) of 4,317 and a population density of 1,641 inhabitants per square kilometre (4,250/sq mi).
