= Giske (island) =

Island in Møre og Romsdal, Norway

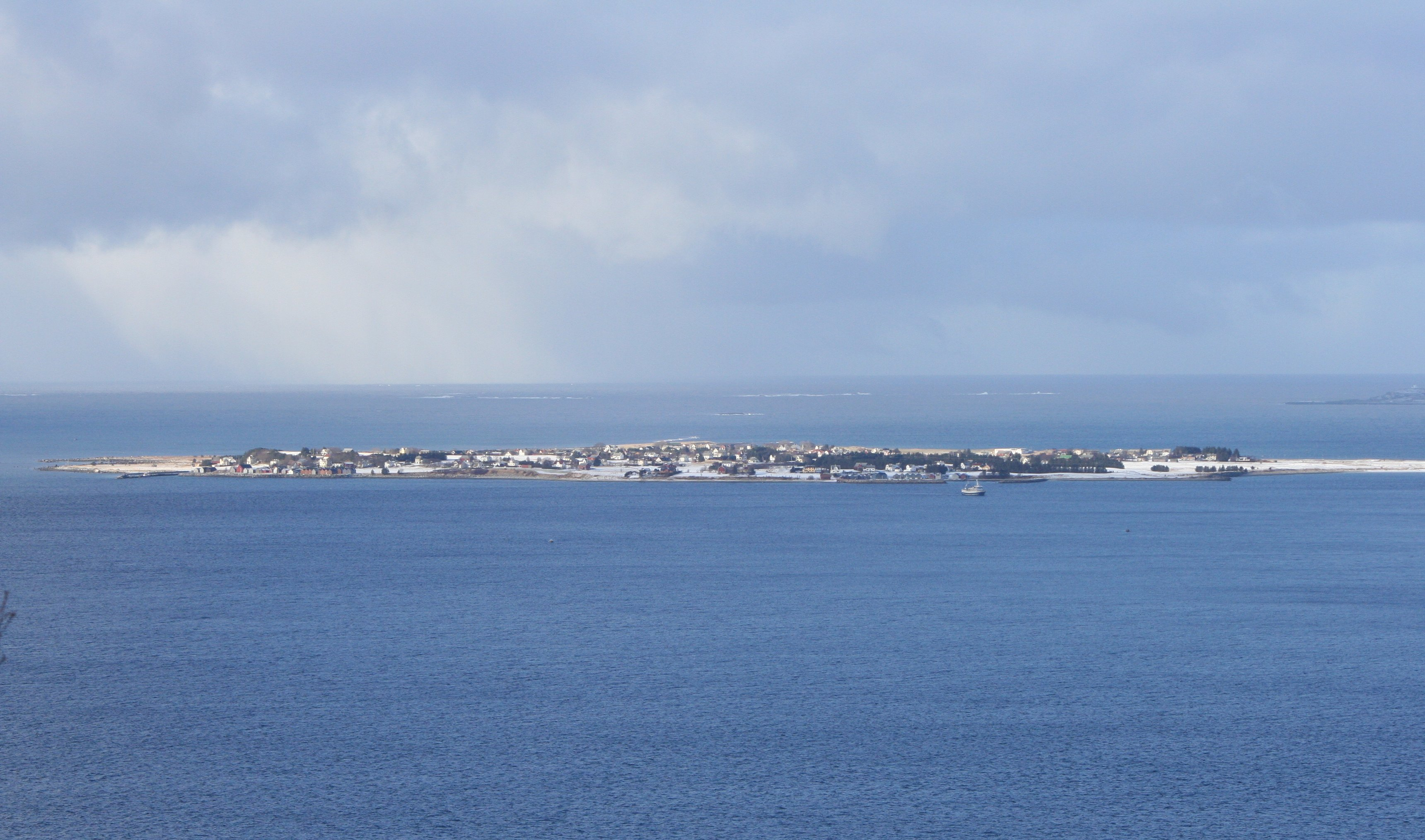
- Interactive map of Giske

Geography
- Location: Møre og Romsdal, Norway
- Coordinates: 62.5024°N 6.0396°E
- Area: 2.67 km^{2} (1.03 sq mi)
- Length: 2.5 km (1.55 mi)
- Width: 2.5 km (1.55 mi)
- Highest elevation: 23 m (75 ft)

Administration
- Norway
- County: Møre og Romsdal
- Municipality: Giske Municipality

Giske is an island in Giske Municipality in Møre og Romsdal county, Norway. It covers an area of 2.67 square kilometers (1.03 sq mi). It is flat, with the highest point 23 meters (75 ft) above mean sea level.

The island is connected by the Giske Bridge to the neighbouring island of Valderøya to the east and by the Godøy Tunnel to the island of Godøya to the southwest. Giske Church, dating back to the 12th century, sits on the southern coast of the island.

The village of Giske is the one village located on the small island. The urban centre of the village is located in the centre of the island.

== See also ==
- List of islands of Norway
