= Godøy Chapel =

Church in Møre og Romsdal, Norway

- Godøy kapell
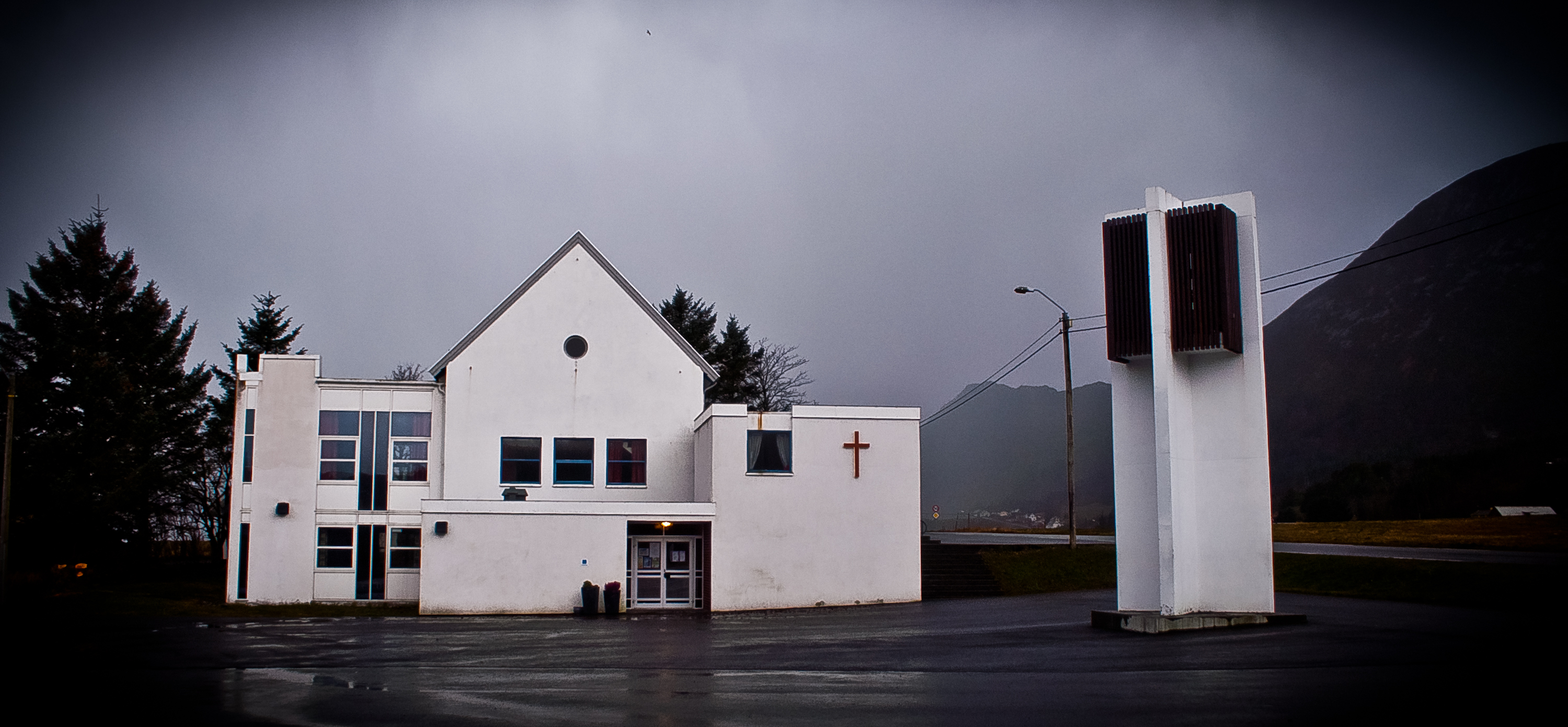
- View of the chapel
- Godøy Chapel
- 62°28′06″N 6°00′54″E
- Location: Giske Municipality, Møre og Romsdal
- Country: Norway
- Denomination: Church of Norway
- Churchmanship: Evangelical Lutheran

History
- Status: Chapel
- Founded: 1902
- Consecrated: 1979

Architecture
- Functional status: Active
- Architect: O. S. Solheim
- Architectural type: Long church
- Completed: 1953 (73 years ago)

Specifications
- Capacity: 200
- Materials: Stone

Administration
- Diocese: Møre bispedømme
- Deanery: Nordre Sunnmøre prosti
- Parish: Giske
- Norwegian Cultural Heritage Site
- Type: Church
- Status: Not protected
- ID: 84273

Godøy Chapel (Norwegian: Godøy kapell) is a chapel of the Church of Norway in Giske Municipality in Møre og Romsdal county, Norway. It is located on the small island of Godøy. It is an annex chapel in the Giske parish which is part of the Nordre Sunnmøre prosti (deanery) in the Diocese of Møre. The stone chapel was built in 1953 using plans drawn up by the architect O.S. Solheim. The chapel seats about 200 people.

== History ==
In 1902, a small prayer house was built on the island of Godøy. In 1953, the old building was torn down and a new prayer house was constructed. In 1979, the building was expanded using plans by Olav Solheim. After the addition, the prayer house was upgraded to the status of annex chapel for the parish. In both 2001 and again in 2008 the chapel was enlarged. The chapel is owned by a foundation and it is rented by the parish council for church activities. It is also used for other purposes.

== See also ==
- List of churches in Møre
