= Giske Church =

Church in Møre og Romsdal, Norway

- Giske kyrkje
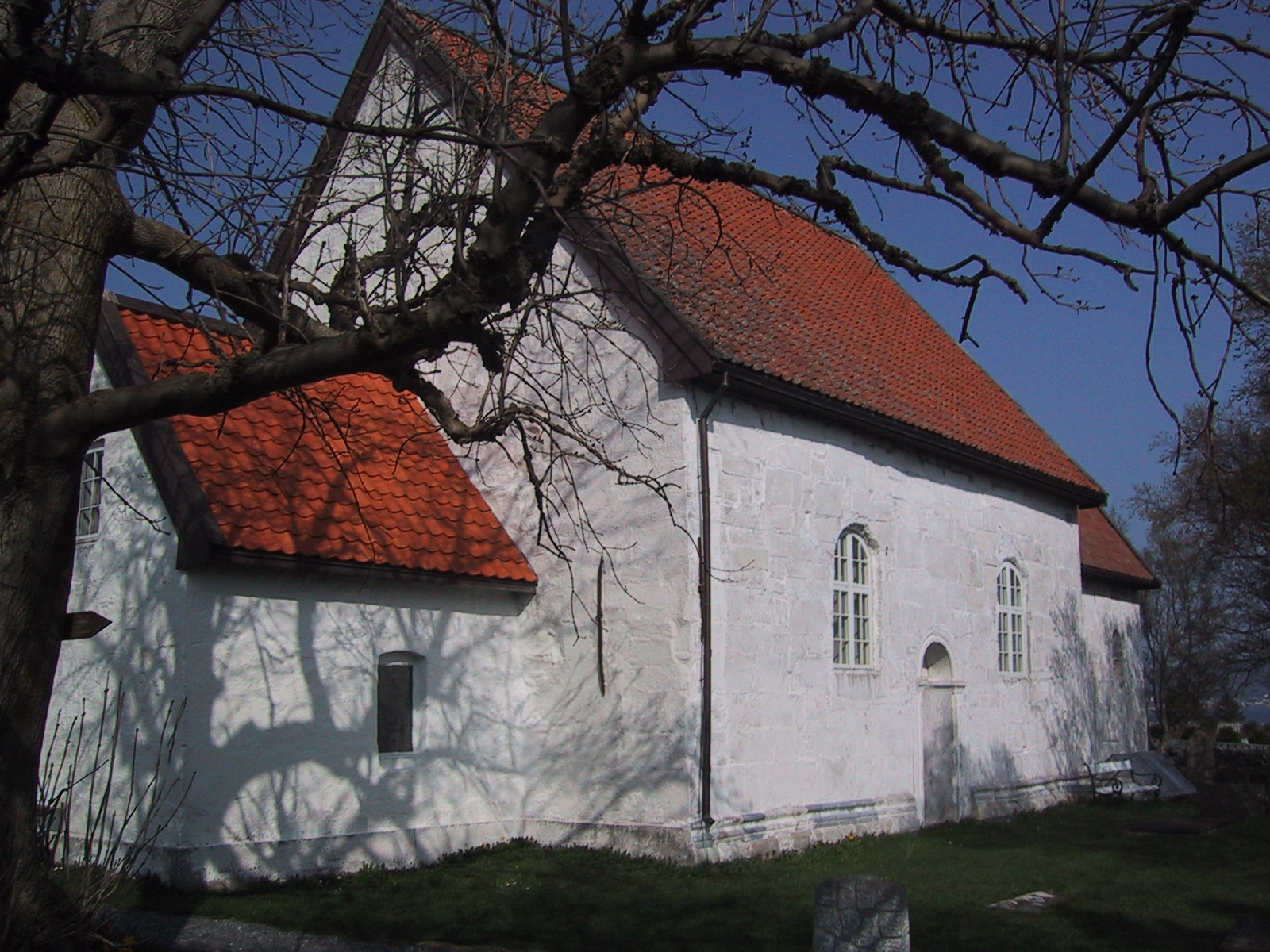
- View of the church
- Giske Church
- 62°29′55″N 6°03′01″E
- Location: Giske Municipality, Møre og Romsdal
- Country: Norway
- Denomination: Church of Norway
- Previous denomination: Catholic Church
- Churchmanship: Evangelical Lutheran
- Website: www.giske.kyrkja.no

History
- Status: Parish church
- Founded: c. 12th century
- Consecrated: c. 12th century

Architecture
- Functional status: Active
- Architectural type: Long church
- Style: Norman
- Completed: c. 1150 (876 years ago)

Specifications
- Capacity: 125
- Materials: White marble

Administration
- Diocese: Møre bispedømme
- Deanery: Nordre Sunnmøre prosti
- Parish: Giske
- Norwegian Cultural Heritage Site
- Type: Church
- Status: Automatically protected
- ID: 84245

Giske Church (Norwegian: Giske kyrkje) is a 12th-century marble parish church of the Church of Norway in Giske Municipality in Møre og Romsdal county, Norway. It is located on the south side of the island of Giske, about 10 kilometres (6.2 mi) northwest of the town of Ålesund. It is the main church for the Giske parish which is part of the Nordre Sunnmøre prosti (deanery) in the Diocese of Møre. The white marble church was built in a long church design in the 12th century using plans drawn up by an unknown architect. The church seats about 125 people. The church is open for guided tours during the summer season.

== Design ==
The church is built of white marble. The origin of the marble is unclear, but it was brought to the island by boat. Where it came from before that is unknown. Today the walls are covered by chalk on the outside and plaster on the inside, so that the marble is only visible in a few places, all on the outside. The architectural style is Norman.

== History ==
The earliest existing historical records of the church date back to 1309, but the church was not new that year. The church was likely built in the 12th century, but exact dates of its construction are not known. The church was originally a family chapel for the noble Giske family which owned the Giske Estate. The original building consisted of a rectangular 12.3-by-8.8-metre (40 ft × 29 ft) nave and a 7.6-by-6.2-metre (25 ft × 20 ft) chancel, but it has been refurbished several times over the centuries. After the Protestant Reformation, the church fell into disuse and disrepair until 1756 when the Estate was purchased and the new owner, Hans Holtermann. Holtermann ordered the extensive renovation of the church soon after. Most of the interior today can be dated back to this renovation, carved by the local craftsman Jakob Sørensøn Giskegaard (1734–1827). The church was again renovated in the 1860s where it received new, larger windows and a new entrance to the choir for the priest to use.

== Media gallery ==
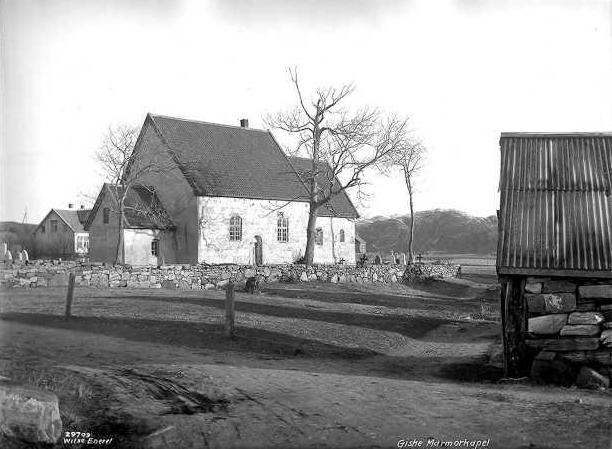
View of the church from 1927

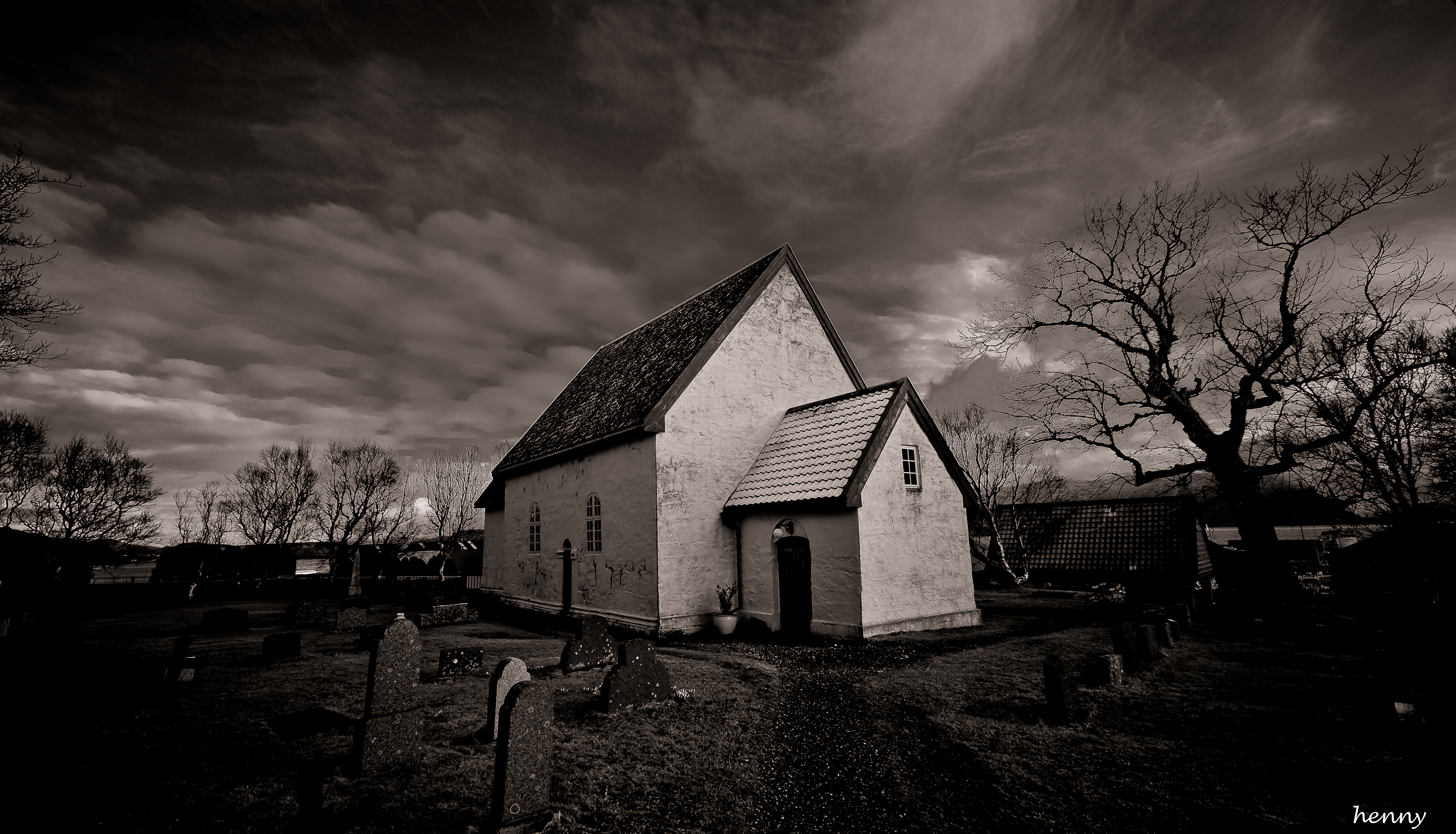

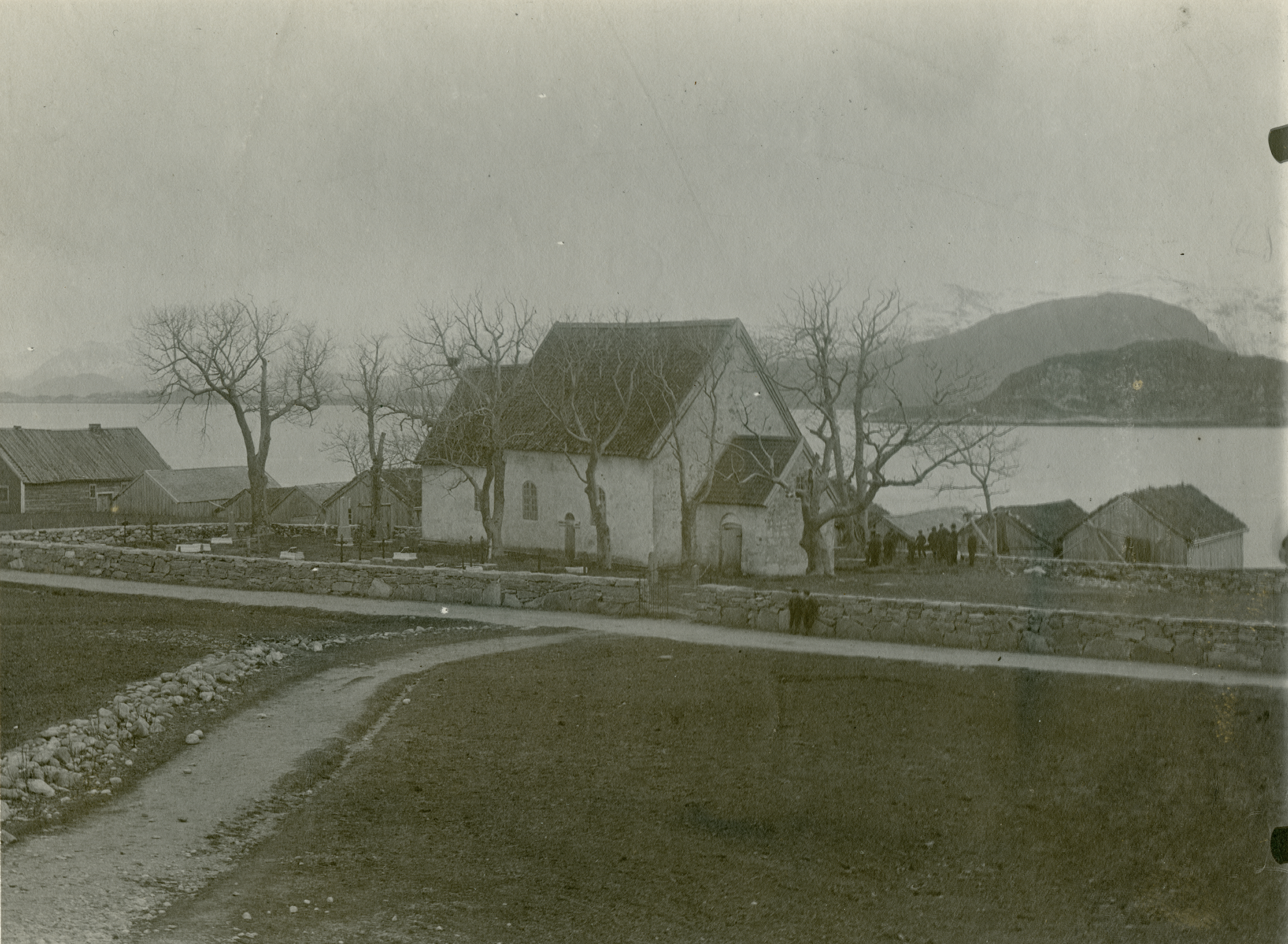

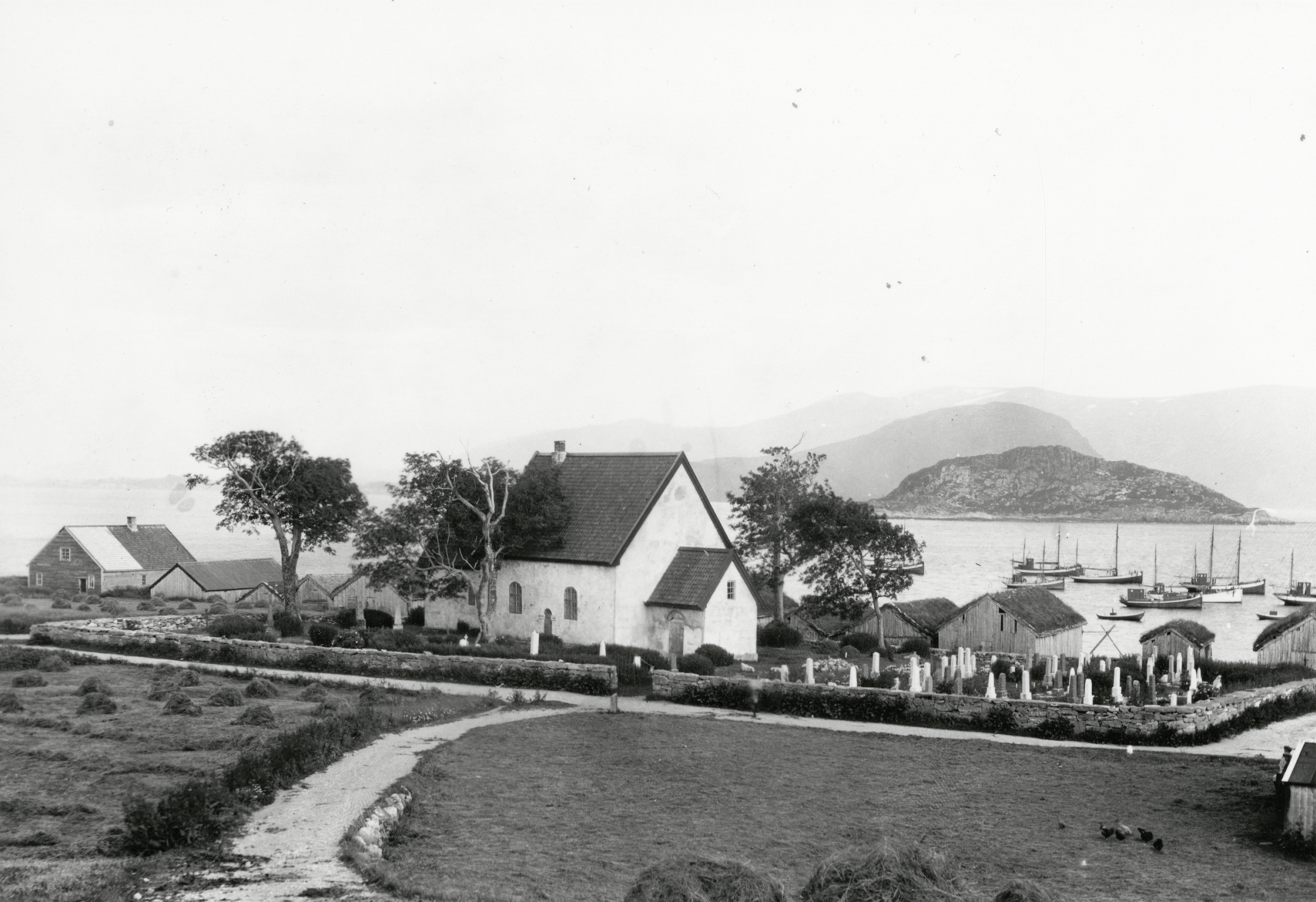

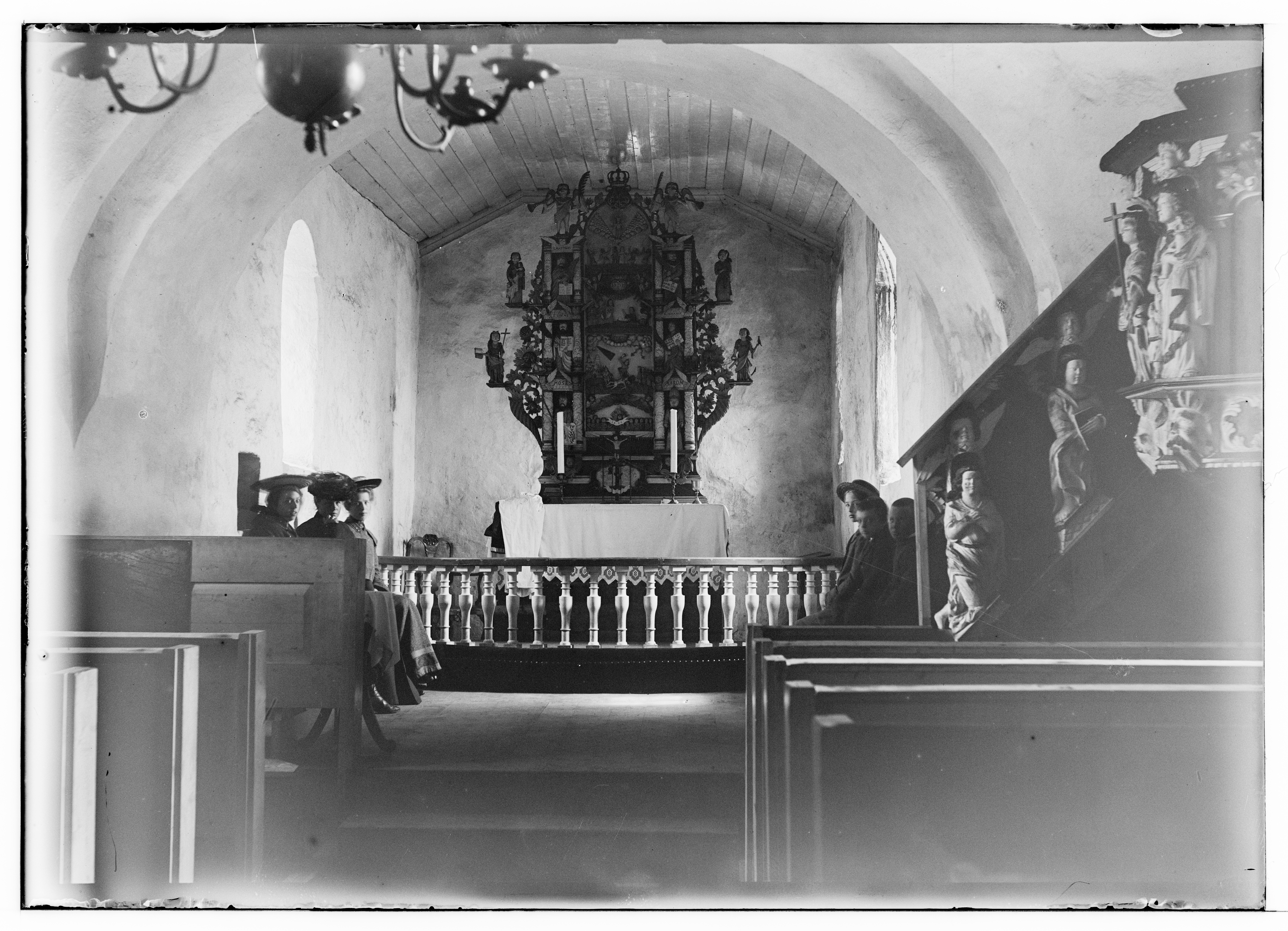

== See also ==
- List of churches in Møre
