= Godøy Tunnel =

Subsea road tunnel in Møre og Romsdal, Norway

Godøy Tunnel Godøytunnelen
- Interactive map of Godøy Tunnel; Godøytunnelen

Overview
- Location: Giske Municipality, Norway
- Coordinates: 62°29′35″N 006°02′48″E
- Route: Fv658

Operation
- Opened: 1989
- Operator: Statens vegvesen

Technical
- Length: 3,844 m (12,612 ft)
- No. of lanes: 2
- Min elevation: −153 metres (−502 ft)
- Tunnel clearance: 4.5 metres (15 ft)
- Width: 7 metres (23 ft)
- Grade: 10%

The Godøy Tunnel (Norwegian: Godøytunnelen) is a subsea road tunnel which runs between the islands of Giske and Godøy in Giske Municipality, Møre og Romsdal county, Norway. The tunnel is 3,844 meters (12,612 ft) long; it is part of County Road 658 and the Vigra Fixed Link. It opened in 1989. The tunnel reaches a depth of 153 metres (502 ft) below sea level, with a maximum road grade of 10%.
