= Skodje =

Skodje may refer to:

== Places ==
- Skodje (village), a village in Ålesund Municipality in Møre og Romsdal county, Norway
- Skodje Municipality, a former municipality in Møre og Romsdal county, Norway
- Skodje Church, a church in Ålesund Municipality in Møre og Romsdal county, Norway
- Skodje Bridge, a bridge in Ålesund Municipality in Møre og Romsdal county, Norway

== Other ==
- Skodje IL, a sports club based in Ålesund Municipality in Møre og Romsdal county, Norway
- Skodje Stadion, a sports stadium in Ålesund Municipality in Møre og Romsdal county, Norway
