= Margrethe Tennfjord =

Norwegian politician (1935–2024)

Margrethe Lovise Tennfjord, née Gudmundseth (30 October 1935 – 11 February 2024) was a Norwegian politician for the Christian Democratic Party.

She grew up at Glomset in Skodje Municipality. Having finished Volda Teachers' College, she embarked on a career as a schoolteacher in Vatne in 1960. Margrethe Gudmundseth married Ragnar Tennfjord.

Tennfjord remained as a schoolteacher until 1991, when she was elected mayor of Haram Municipality. She served until 1999, being the first female mayor of Haram. She was also elected to Møre og Romsdal as well as Møre og Romsdal school board for eight years. She was also elected as a deputy representative to the Parliament of Norway from Møre og Romsdal during the terms 1977–1981, 1981–1985 and 1985–1989. In total she met during 9 days of parliamentary session.

She was a board member of Ålesund Hospital, Ålesund University College, Borgund Folk High School as well as local inner mission and Normisjon groups.

She died at the age of 88, survived by her husband and two daughters, and was buried from Vatne Church.
