= Lepsøy Chapel =

Church in Møre og Romsdal, Norway

- Lepsøy kapell
- Lepsøy Chapel
- 62°36′57″N 6°12′39″E
- Location: Haram Municipality, Møre og Romsdal
- Country: Norway
- Denomination: Church of Norway
- Churchmanship: Evangelical Lutheran

History
- Status: Chapel
- Founded: 1896
- Consecrated: 1956

Architecture
- Functional status: Active
- Architectural type: Long church
- Completed: 1896 (130 years ago)

Specifications
- Capacity: 150
- Materials: Wood

Administration
- Diocese: Møre bispedømme
- Deanery: Nordre Sunnmøre prosti
- Parish: Haram og Fjørtoft

Lepsøy Chapel (Norwegian: Lepsøy bedehuskapell) is a chapel of the Church of Norway in Haram Municipality in Møre og Romsdal county, Norway. It is located on the southern part of the island of Lepsøya. It is an annex chapel for the Haram og Fjørtoft parish which is part of the Nordre Sunnmøre prosti (deanery) in the Diocese of Møre. The white, wooden church was built in a long church design in 1896 using plans drawn up by the architect . The church seats about 150 people.

== History ==
The island of Lepsøya was given permission to build a small prayer house in 1896. In 1956, the building was renovated and enlarged as part of an upgrade to the status of annex chapel for the parish. It was consecrated in 1956. The chapel doesn't have a graveyard at the site, but there is a cemetery located about 1.5 kilometres (0.93 mi) to the north that is used by the chapel.

== See also ==
- List of churches in Møre
