= Tennfjord (surname) =

Tennfjord is a Norwegian surname. Notable people with the surname include:

- Dag Olav Tennfjord (born 1963), Norwegian local politician
- Ingvild Wedaa Tennfjord (born 1977), Norwegian journalist, sommelier, and wine connoisseur
- Kjell Tennfjord (born 1953), Norwegian siviløkonom and entrepreneur
- Margrethe Tennfjord (1935–2024), Norwegian politician
- Oddbjørn Tennfjord (born 1941), Norwegian teacher and singer
- Marit Tennfjord (1911–2004), Norwegian musician and conductor
