= Vigrafjorden =

Fjord in Møre og Romsdal, Norway

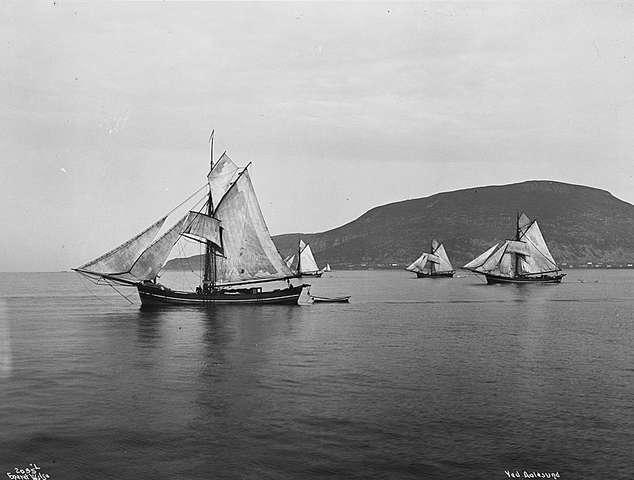
- View of the fjord (c. 1885); Credit: Axel Lindahl
- Interactive map of the fjord
- Location: Møre og Romsdal county, Norway
- Coordinates: 62.6032°N 6.10122°E
- Type: Fjord
- Basin countries: Norway
- Max. length: 10 kilometres (6.2 mi)
- Max. depth: 181 metres (594 ft)

The Vigrafjorden is a fjord located in Møre og Romsdal county, Norway. The fjord forms the border between Haram Municipality and Giske Municipality.

It is located east of the island of Vigra, after which it is named (in Giske Municipality) and southwest of the island of Lepsøya (in Haram Municipality). In the west, the fjord stretches from the Norwegian Sea about 10 km (6.2 mi) to the small islands of Kalvøya and Bjørnøya in the southeast. At its deepest, the fjord reaches 181 metres (594 ft) below sea level.

Ålesund Airport, Vigra is located on the west side of the fjord, on the island of Vigra. The village of Roald is located a little north of the airport.

== See also ==
- List of Norwegian fjords
