= List of churches in Møre =

The list of churches in Møre is a list of the Church of Norway churches in the Diocese of Møre in Norway. It includes all of the parishes in Møre og Romsdal county. The Diocese is based at the Molde Cathedral in the city of Molde in Molde Municipality.

The list is divided into several sections, one for each deanery (prosti; headed by a provost) in the diocese. Administratively within each deanery, the churches within each municipality elects their own church council (fellesråd). Each municipality may have one or more parishes (sokn) within the municipality. Each parish elects their own councils (soknerådet). Each parish has one or more local church. The number and size of the deaneries and parishes has changed over time.

== Molde domprosti ==
This arch-deanery (Norwegian: domprosti) is home to the Molde Cathedral, the seat of the Bishop of the Diocese of Møre. Molde domprosti includes all the parishes in the municipalities of Molde, Aukra, and Hustadvika, all of which surround the town of Molde in Molde Municipality where the deanery is headquartered.

The deanery was established in the 19th century when the old Romsdal prosti was divided into Ytre Romsdal prosti (along the coast) and the Indre Romsdal prosti (inland parishes). This deanery was called Ytre Romsdal prosti and it originally included the parishes in Fræna, Molde, Midsund, and Aukra. The Diocese of Møre was established on 18 September 1983 and on that date, the church in Molde became the new seat of the diocese. After this, the Ytre Romsdal prosti was renamed Molde domprosti. On 1 January 2019, the churches in Eide Municipality were transferred from Ytre Nordmøre prosti to Molde domprosti in preparation for a municipal merger on 1 January 2020. On 1 January 2020, the municipality of Molde was enlarged so the parishes in the former Nesset Municipality (from Indre Romsdal prosti) were moved into the Molde domprosti.

| Municipality | Parish (sokn) | Church | Location | Year built | Photo |
|---|---|---|---|---|---|
| Aukra | Aukra | Aukra Church | Aukrasanden | 1835 | |
| Hustadvika | Eide | Eide Church (Møre og Romsdal) | Eide | 1871 | |
| Hustadvika | Eide | Gaustad Chapel | Gaustad | 2001 | |
| Hustadvika | Bud | Bud Church | Bud | 1717 | |
| Hustadvika | Hustad | Hustad Church | Hustad | 1874 | |
| Hustadvika | Vågøy og Myrbostad | Myrbostad Church | Elnesvågen | 1880 | |
| Hustadvika | Vågøy og Myrbostad | Vågøy Church | Vågøya | 1904 | |
| Molde | Bolsøy | Nordbyen Church | Molde | 2006 | |
| Molde | Bolsøy | Røbekk Church | Røbekk | 1898 | |
| Molde | Eikesdal | Eikesdal Church | Eikesdalen | 1866 | |
| Molde | Eresfjord | Sira Church | Eresfjord | 1869 | |
| Molde | Kleive | Kleive Church | Kleive | 1858 | |
| Molde | Midsund | Otrøy Church | Uglvik, Otrøya | 1878 | |
| Molde | Midsund | Nord-Heggdal Chapel | Nord-Heggdal | 1974 | |
| Molde | Molde domkirke | Molde Cathedral | Molde | 1957 | |
| Molde | Nesset | Nesset Church | Eidsvåg | 1878 | |
| Molde | Røvik og Veøy | Røvik Church | Røvika | 1905 | |
| Molde | Røvik og Veøy | Veøy Church | Sølsnes | 1907 | |
| Molde | Røvik og Veøy | Old Veøy Church | Veøya | 1200 | |
| Molde | Sekken | Sekken Church | Sekken | 1908 | |
| Molde | Vistdal | Vistdal Church | Myklebostad | 1869 | |

== Søre Sunnmøre prosti ==
This deanery (Norwegian: prosti) covers several municipalities in southwestern part of Møre og Romsdal county. It includes all of the parishes in the municipalities of Hareid, Herøy, Sande, Ulstein, Vanylven, Volda, and Ørsta. The deanery is headquartered at Volda Church in the village of Volda in Volda Municipality.

The deanery was established in 1818 when the old Søndmør prosti was divided into Nordre Søndmør prosti and Søndre Søndmør prosti. A royal resolution on 19 May 1922 changed the deanery name from "Søndre Søndmør prosti" to "Søre Sunnmøre prosti". On 1 January 2020, the parish of Hornindal Municipality was added to this deanery when Hornindal became a part of Volda Municipality.

| Municipality | Parish (sokn) | Church | Location | Year built | Photo |
|---|---|---|---|---|---|
| Hareid | Hareid | Hareid Church | Hareid | 1877 | |
| Herøy Municipality | Herøy | Herøy Church | Fosnavåg | 2003 | |
| Herøy Municipality | Indre Herøy | Indre Herøy Church | Indre Herøy | 1916 | |
| Herøy Municipality | Leikanger | Leikanger Church | Leikong | 1807 | |
| Sande | Sande | Sande Church | Sandsøya | 1880 | |
| Sande | Gursken | Gursken Church | Haugsbygda | 1919 | |
| Sande | Gursken | Larsnes Chapel | Larsnes | 1989 | |
| Ulstein | Ulstein | Ulstein Church | Ulsteinvik | 1849 | |
| Vanylven | Syvde | Syvde Church | Myklebost | 1837 | |
| Vanylven | Rovde | Rovde Church | Rovdane | 1872 | |
| Vanylven | Vanylven | Vanylven Church | Slagnes | 1863 | |
| Vanylven | Vanylven | Saint Jetmund Church | Åheim | 1150 | |
| Vanylven | Åram | Åram Church | Åram | 1927 | |
| Volda | Austefjord | Austefjord Church | Fyrde | 1773 | |
| Volda | Dalsfjord | Dalsfjord Church | Dravlaus | 1910 | |
| Volda | Hornindal | Hornindal Church | Grodås | 1856 | |
| Volda | Kilsfjord | Kilsfjord Church | Straumshamn | 1974 | |
| Volda | Storfjorden | Bjørke Church | Bjørke | 1919 | |
| Volda | Volda | Volda Church | Volda | 1932 | |
| Ørsta | Hjørundfjord | Hjørundfjord Church | Sæbø | 1880 | |
| Ørsta | Vartdal | Vartdal Church | Nordre Vartdal | 1876 | |
| Ørsta | Ørsta | Ørsta Church | Ørsta | 1864 | |

== Nordre Sunnmøre prosti ==
This deanery (Norwegian: prosti) covers several municipalities in western part of Møre og Romsdal county. It includes all of the parishes in the municipalities of Fjord, Giske, Stranda, Sula, Sykkylven, and Ålesund. The deanery is headquartered in the town of Ålesund in Ålesund Municipality.

The deanery was established in 1818 when the old Søndmør prosti was divided into Nordre Søndmør prosti and Søndre Søndmør prosti. In 1863, the eastern part of this deanery was split off to form the new Østre Søndmør prosti (later renamed Austre Sunnmøre prosti). A royal resolution on 19 May 1922 changed the deanery name from "Nordre Søndmør prosti" to "Nordre Sunnmøre prosti". On 1 January 2020, the parishes in Austre Sunnmøre prosti were merged into this deanery. That deanery had covered six municipalities in southern part of Møre og Romsdal county and it was headquartered in the village of Sjøholt in Ørskog Municipality.

| Municipality | Parish (sokn) | Church | Location | Year built | Photo |
|---|---|---|---|---|---|
| Fjord | Norddal | Norddal Church | Norddal | 1782 | |
| Fjord | Norddal | Sylte Church | Sylte | 1863 | |
| Fjord | Stordal | Stordal Church | Stordal | 1907 | |
| Fjord | Stordal | Old Stordal Church | Stordal | 1789 | |
| Giske | Giske | Giske Church | Giske | 1170 | |
| Giske | Giske | Godøy Chapel | Leitebakk | 1953 | |
| Giske | Valderøy | Valderøy Church | Nordstrand | 1961 | |
| Giske | Vigra | Vigra Church | Vigra | 1894 | |
| Haram | Brattvåg | Brattvåg Church | Brattvåg | 1977 | |
| Haram | Brattvåg | Hildre Church | Hildrestranda | 1905 | |
| Haram | Hamnsund | Hamnsund Church | near Søvik | 1875 | |
| Haram | Haram og Fjørtoft | Fjørtoft Church | Fjørtofta | 1878 | |
| Haram | Haram og Fjørtoft | Haram Church | Austnes | 1838 | |
| Haram | Haram og Fjørtoft | Lepsøy Chapel | Lepsøya | 1896 | |
| Haram | Vatne | Vatne Church | Vatne | 1868 | |
| Stranda | Geiranger | Geiranger Church | Geiranger | 1842 | |
| Stranda | Liabygda | Liabygda Church | Liabygda | 1917 | |
| Stranda | Stranda | Stranda Church | Stranda | 1838 | |
| Stranda | Sunnylven | Sunnylven Church | Hellesylt | 1859 | |
| Sula | Sula | Langevåg Church | Langevåg | 1948 | |
| Sula | Sula | Indre Sula Church | Mauseidvåg | 1984 | |
| Sykkylven | Sykkylven | Sykkylven Church | Aure | 1990 | |
| Sykkylven | Ikornnes | Ikornnes Church | Ikornnes | 1978 | |
| Ålesund | Borgund | Borgund Church | Borgund | 1130 | |
| Ålesund | Ellingsøy | Ellingsøy Church | Ellingsøya | 1998 | |
| Ålesund | Sandøy | Sandøy Church | Sandøya | 1812 | |
| Ålesund | Sandøy | Harøy Church | Harøya | 1934 | |
| Ålesund | Skodje | Skodje Church | Skodje | 1860 | |
| Ålesund | Spjelkavik | Spjelkavik Church | Spjelkavik | 1987 | |
| Ålesund | Volsdalen | Volsdalen Church | Nørve (in Ålesund city) | 1974 | |
| Ålesund | Ålesund | Ålesund Church | Aspøya (in Ålesund city) | 1909 | |
| Ålesund | Ålesund | Skarbøvik Church | Hessa | 1995 | |
| Ålesund | Ørskog | Ørskog Church | Sjøholt | 1873 | |

== Indre Romsdal prosti ==
This deanery (Norwegian: prosti) covers two municipalities (Vestnes and Rauma) in central part of Møre og Romsdal county. The deanery is headquartered in the town of Åndalsnes in Rauma Municipality.

The deanery was established in the 19th century when the old Romsdal prosti was divided into Ytre Romsdal prosti (along the coast) and the Indre Romsdal prosti (inland parishes). This parish originally included the parishes in the modern-day municipalities of Rauma, Vestnes, and Nesset. On 1 January 2020, the parishes in Nesset Municipality were transferred from this deanery to Molde domprosti when it became a part of the new, larger Molde Municipality.

| Municipality | Parish (sokn) | Church | Location | Year built | Photo |
|---|---|---|---|---|---|
| Rauma | Eid og Holm | Eid Church | Eidsbygda | 1796 | |
| Rauma | Eid og Holm | Holm Church | Holm | 1907 | |
| Rauma | Eid og Holm | Rødven Church | Rødven | 1907 | |
| Rauma | Eid og Holm | Rødven Stave Church | Rødven | 1200 | |
| Rauma | Grytten | Grytten Church | Veblungsnes | 1829 | |
| Rauma | Hen | Hen Church | Isfjorden | 1831 | |
| Rauma | Kors | Kors Church | Marstein in Romsdalen | 1797 | |
| Rauma | Voll | Voll Church | Voll | 1896 | |
| Rauma | Voll | Innfjorden Chapel | Innfjorden | 1976 | |
| Rauma | Øverdalen | Øverdalen Church | Verma | 1902 | |
| Vestnes | Fiksdal | Fiksdal Church | Fiksdal | 1866 | |
| Vestnes | Tresfjord | Tresfjord Church | Tresfjord | 1828 | |
| Vestnes | Vestnes | Vestnes Church | Vestnes | 1872 | |
| Vestnes | Vike | Vike Church | Vikebukt | 1970 | |
| Vestnes | Vågstranda | Vågstranda Church | Vågstranda | 1870 | |

== Ytre Nordmøre prosti ==
This deanery (Norwegian: prosti) covers four island municipalities in northwestern part of Møre og Romsdal county. It includes all the parishes in the municipalities of Aure, Averøy, Kristiansund, and Smøla. The deanery is headquartered in the town of Kristiansund in Kristiansund Municipality.

The deanery was established in 1857 when the old Nordmør prosti was divided into Ytre Nordmør prosti and Indre Nordmør prosti. A royal resolution on 19 May 1922 changed the deanery name from "Ytre Nordmør prosti" to "Ytre Nordmøre prosti". On 1 January 2019, the churches in Eide Municipality were transferred from Ytre Nordmøre prosti to Molde domprosti in preparation for a municipal merger on 1 January 2020.

| Municipality | Parish (sokn) | Church | Location | Year built | Photo |
|---|---|---|---|---|---|
| Aure | Aure | Aure Church | Aure | 1924 | |
| Aure | Stemshaug | Stemshaug Church | Stemshaug | 1908 | |
| Aure | Tustna | Gullstein Church | Gullstein | 1864 | |
| Aure | Tustna | Sør-Tustna Chapel | Tømmervåg | 1952 | |
| Averøy | Bremsnes | Bremsnes Church | Bremsnes | 1771 | |
| Averøy | Bremsnes | Langøy Chapel | Langøy | 1935 | |
| Averøy | Kornstad | Kornstad Church | Kornstad | 1871 | |
| Averøy | Kvernes | Kvernes Church | Kvernes | 1893 | |
| Averøy | Kvernes | Kvernes Stave Church | Kvernes | 1300s | |
| Kristiansund | Frei | Frei Church | Nedre Frei | 1897 | |
| Kristiansund | Kristiansund | Kirkelandet Church | Kirkelandet | 1964 | |
| Kristiansund | Kristiansund | Grip Stave Church | Grip | 1470 | |
| Kristiansund | Nordlandet | Nordlandet Church | Nordlandet | 1914 | |
| Smøla | Brattvær | Brattvær Church | south of Råket | 1917 | |
| Smøla | Edøy | Edøy Church | Straumen | 1885 | |
| Smøla | Edøy | Old Edøy Church | Edøya | 1190 | |
| Smøla | Hopen | Hopen Church | Hopen | 1892 | |

== Indre Nordmøre prosti ==
This deanery (Norwegian: prosti) covers four municipalities in northeastern part of Møre og Romsdal county. It includes all of the parishes in the municipalities of Gjemnes, Sunndal, Surnadal, and Tingvoll. The deanery is headquartered in the village of Tingvollvågen in Tingvoll Municipality.

The deanery was established in 1857 when the old Nordmøre prosti was divided into Ytre Nordmøre prosti and Indre Nordmøre prosti. A royal resolution on 19 May 1922 changed the deanery name from "Indre Nordmør prosti" to "Indre Nordmøre prosti". On 1 January 2020, the parishes in Rindal Municipality and Halsa Municipality were transferred to the Orkdal prosti in the neighboring Diocese of Nidaros to the north (because the municipalities switched to Trøndelag county).

| Municipality | Parish (sokn) | Church | Location | Year built | Photo |
|---|---|---|---|---|---|
| Gjemnes | Gjemnes | Gjemnes Church | Gjemnes | 1893 | |
| Gjemnes | Øre | Øre Church | Øre | 1865 | |
| Gjemnes | Øre | Osmarka Chapel | Heggem | 1910 | |
| Sunndal | Hov | Hov Church | Sunndalsøra | 1887 | |
| Sunndal | Romfo | Romfo Church | Romfo | 1821 | |
| Sunndal | Romfo | Gjøra Church | Gjøra | 1935 | |
| Sunndal | Øksendal | Øksendal Church | Øksendalsøra | 1894 | |
| Sunndal | Ålvundeid | Ålvundeid Church | Ålvundeidet | 1848 | |
| Surnadal | Mo | Mo Church | Mo | 1728 | |
| Surnadal | Stangvik | Stangvik Church | Stangvik | 1896 | |
| Surnadal | Todalen | Todalen Church | Todalsøra | 1861 | |
| Surnadal | Øye og Ranes | Ranes Church | Ranes | 1869 | |
| Surnadal | Øye og Ranes | Øye Church | Skei | 1871 | |
| Surnadal | Åsskard | Åsskard Church | Åsskard | 1876 | |
| Tingvoll | Straumsnes | Straumsnes Church | Straumsnes | 1864 | |
| Tingvoll | Tingvoll | Tingvoll Church | Tingvollvågen | 1180 | |
