= Skodje Municipality =

Former municipality in Møre og Romsdal, Norway

Skodje Municipality Skodje kommune
- Former municipality
- Skoue herred (historic name)
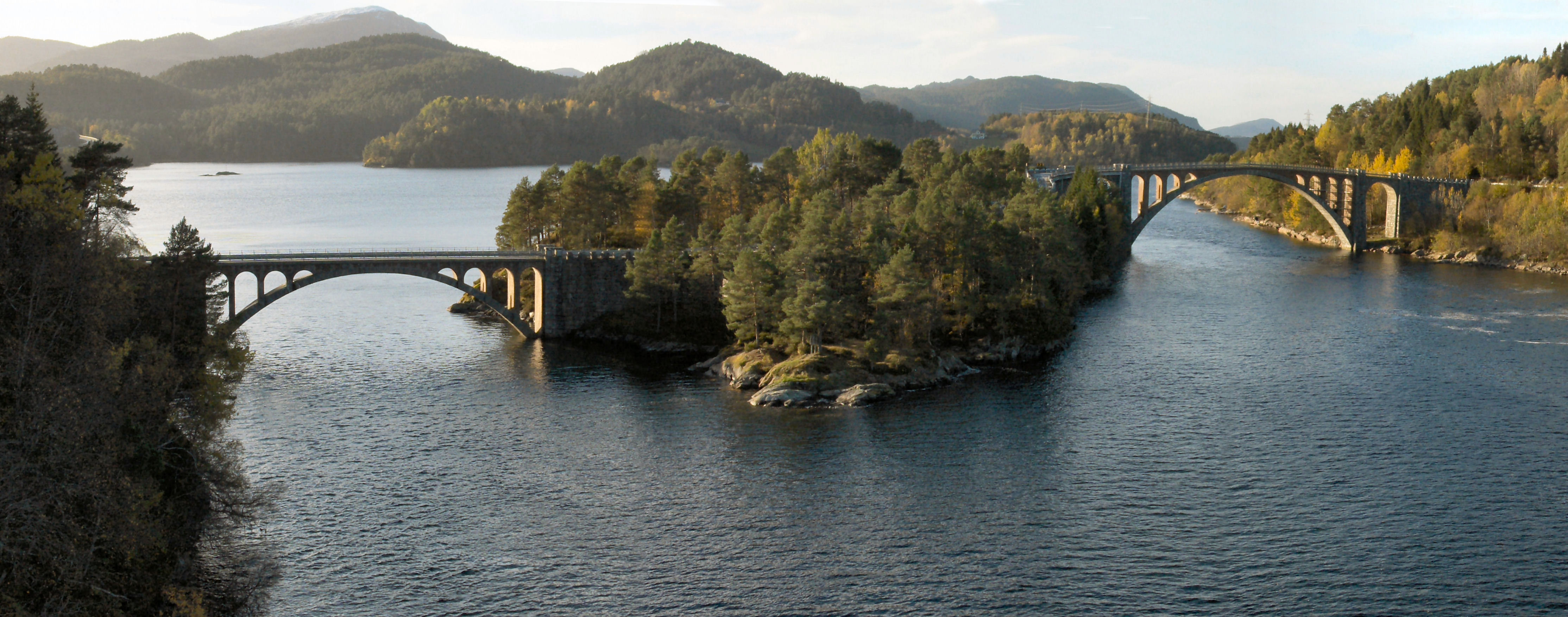
- View of the Skodje bridges

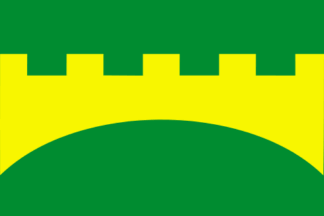
- Flag Coat of arms

- Møre og Romsdal within Norway

- Skodje within Møre og Romsdal
- Coordinates: 62°30′58″N 06°41′59″E
- Country: Norway
- County: Møre og Romsdal
- District: Sunnmøre
- Established: 1849
  - Preceded by: Borgund Municipality
- Disestablished: 1 Jan 1965
  - Succeeded by: Ørskog Municipality
- Re-established: 1 Jan 1977
  - Preceded by: Ørskog Municipality
- Disestablished: 1 Jan 2020
  - Succeeded by: Ålesund Municipality
- Administrative centre: Skodje

Government
  - Mayor (2015-2019): Dag Olav Tennfjord (H)

Area (upon dissolution)
  - Total: 120.03 km^{2} (46.34 sq mi)
  - Land: 110.74 km^{2} (42.76 sq mi)
  - Water: 9.29 km^{2} (3.59 sq mi) 7.7%
  - Rank: #365 in Norway
- Highest elevation: 806.9 m (2,647 ft)

Population (2019)
  - Total: 4,764
  - Rank: #209 in Norway
  - Density: 39.7/km^{2} (103/sq mi)
  - Change (10 years): ▲ +22.1%
- Demonym(s): Skodjebygdar; Skodjebygder

Official language
  - Norwegian form: Nynorsk
- Time zone: UTC+01:00 (CET)
  - Summer (DST): UTC+02:00 (CEST)
- ISO 3166 code: NO-1529

Skodje (pronounced [skɔʏə] or [skøʏə]) is a former municipality in Møre og Romsdal county, Norway. The 120-square-kilometre (46 sq mi) municipality existed from 1849 until its dissolution in 2020 (except for a short time from 1965-1977). The area is now part of Ålesund Municipality in the traditional district of Sunnmøre. The administrative centre was the village of Skodje. The other main village in the municipality was Valle. The European Route E39/E136 highway runs through the municipality, connecting it to the nearby cities of Ålesund and Molde.

Prior to its dissolution in 2020, the 120-square-kilometre (46 sq mi) municipality was the 365th largest by area out of the 422 municipalities in Norway. Skodje Municipality was the 209th most populous municipality in Norway with a population of about 4,764. The municipality's population density was 39.7 inhabitants per square kilometre (103/sq mi) and its population had increased by 22.1% over the previous 10-year period.

== General information ==
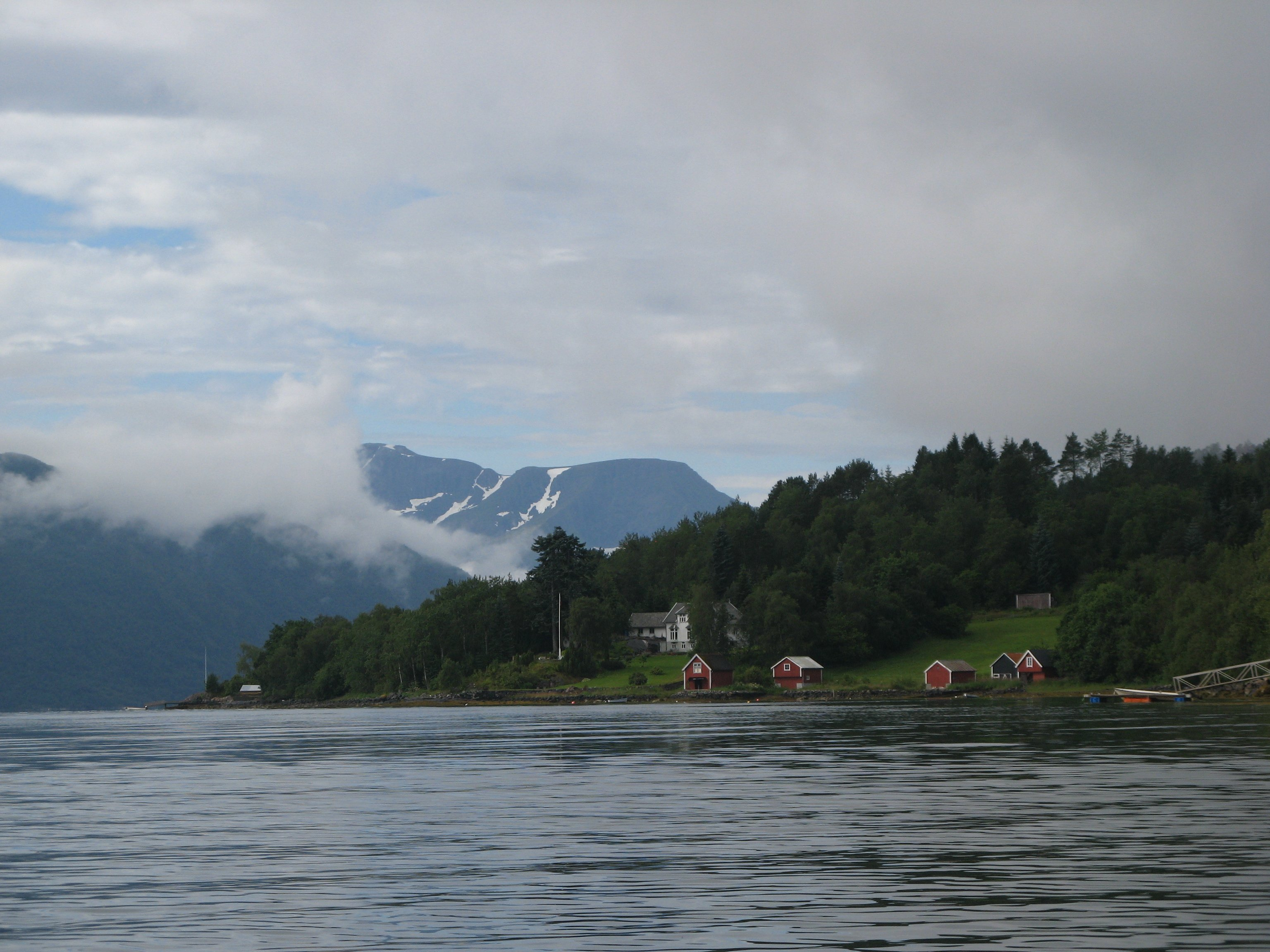
View of Håeimsvika

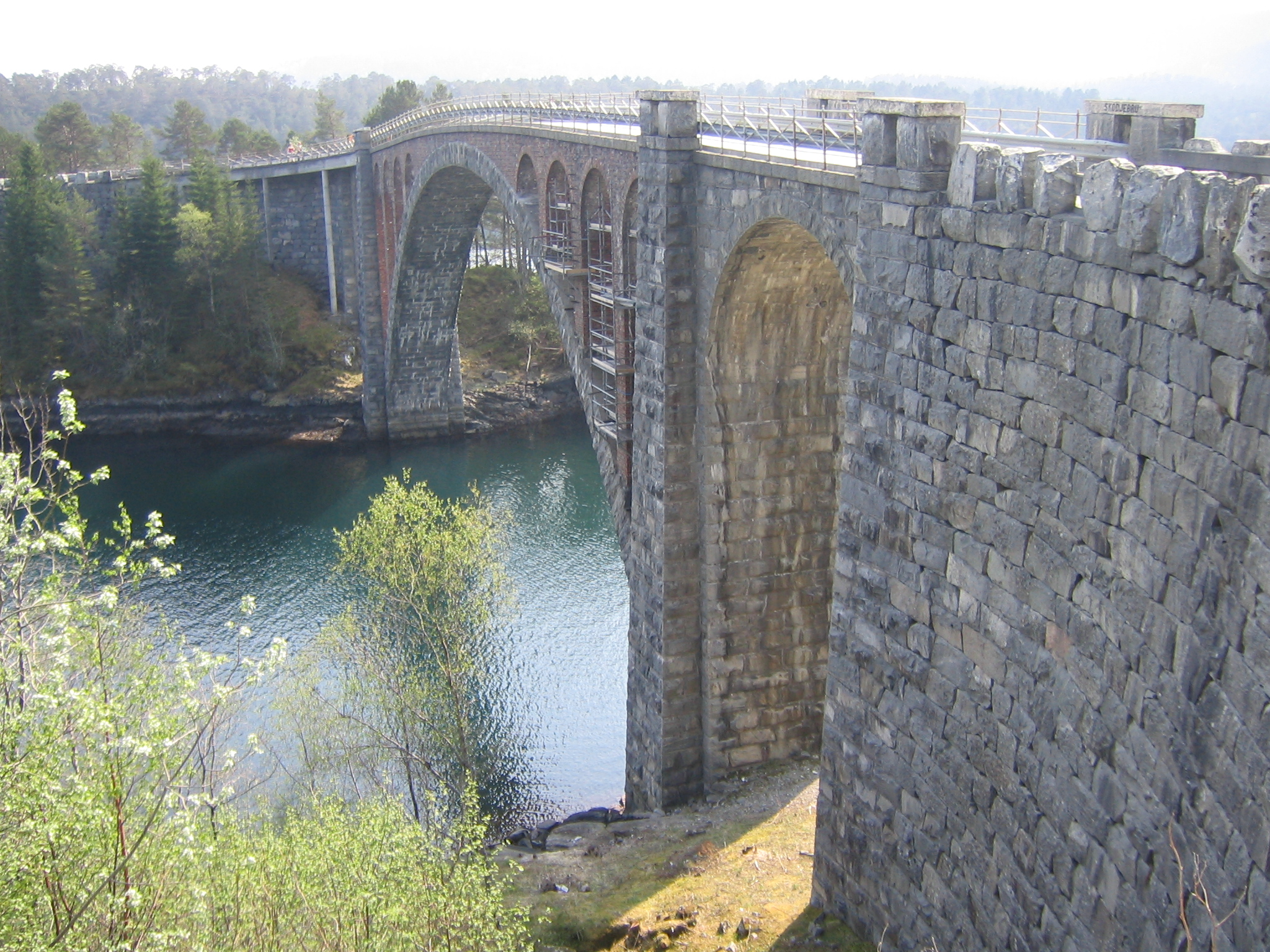
View of the Skodje Bridge

The municipality of Skodje was established in 1849 when the large Borgund Municipality was divided into two: the eastern part (population: 2,170) became the new Skoue Municipality (the spelling later changed) and the western part (population: 4,461) remained as Borgund Municipality. On 1 January 1902, Skodje Municipality was divided into two: the northern part (population: 1,547) became the new Vatne Municipality and the southern part (population: 1,551) remained as a smaller Skodje Municipality.

During the 1960s, there were many municipal mergers across Norway due to the work of the Schei Committee. On 1 January 1965, there was a merger between three neighbors: Stordal Municipality (population: 1,052) in the south, Ørskog Municipality (population: 1,664) in the centre, and Skodje Municipality (population: 2,048) in the north, creating a new, larger Ørskog Municipality. This was merger was short-lived. On 1 January 1977, the merger was reversed all three municipalities were separated once again. This left the newly reconstituted Skodje Municipality with a population of 2,634.

On 1 January 2020, Skodje Municipality was merged with Haram Municipality, Ørskog Municipality, Sandøy Municipality, and Ålesund Municipality to form a new, larger Ålesund Municipality.

=== Name ===
The municipality (originally the parish) is named after the old Skodje farm (Old Norse: Skǫðin) since the first Skodje Church was built there. The first element comes from the word skað which has an unknown meaning. The last element is vin which means "meadow" or "pasture". Before 1879, the name was written Skoue.

=== Coat of arms ===
The coat of arms was granted on 19 June 1987 and they were in use until the municipality was dissolved on 1 January 2020. The official blazon is "Vert, an arched embattled bridge Or" (Norwegian: På grøn grunn ei gull kvelvingsbru med tindar). This means the arms have a green field (background) and the charge is an arched bridge design. The charge has a tincture of Or which means it is commonly colored yellow, but if it is made out of metal, then gold is used. The design was meant to mimic the local Skodje Bridge, a very old bridge which crosses over the Straumen river, a major architectural feat at its time. The arms were designed by Jarle Skuseth. The municipal flag has the same design as the coat of arms.

=== Churches ===
The Church of Norway had one parish (sokn) within Skodje Municipality. It was part of the Austre Sunnmøre prosti (deanery) in the Diocese of Møre.

Churches in Skodje Municipality
Parish (sokn)	Church name	Location of the church	Year built
Skodje	Skodje Church	Skodje	1860

== Geography ==
The municipality of Skodje shared land borders with Haram Municipality to the north, Vestnes Municipality to the northeast, Ørskog Municipality to the southeast, and Ålesund Municipality to the west. Across the Storfjorden to the south was Sykkylven Municipality. Skodje Municipality was located on the mainland and also on part of the island of Uksenøya, plus many small surrounding islands. The Ellingsøyfjorden cut into the municipality from the west. The highest point in the municipality was the 806.9-metre (2,647 ft) tall mountain Frostadtinden, a tripoint on the border of Skodje Municipality, Vestnes Municipality, and Haram Municipality.

== Government ==
Skodje Municipality was responsible for primary education (through 10th grade), outpatient health services, senior citizen services, welfare and other social services, zoning, economic development, and municipal roads and utilities. The municipality was governed by a municipal council of directly elected representatives. The mayor was indirectly elected by a vote of the municipal council. The municipality was under the jurisdiction of the Sunnmøre District Court and the Frostating Court of Appeal.

=== Municipal council ===
The municipal council (Kommunestyre) of Skodje Municipality is made up of 21 representatives that are elected to four year terms. The tables below show the historical composition of the council by political party.

Skodje kommunestyre 2015–2019
Party name (in Nynorsk)	Number of representatives
Labour Party (Arbeidarpartiet)	4
Progress Party (Framstegspartiet)	4
Conservative Party (Høgre)	5
Christian Democratic Party (Kristeleg Folkeparti)	2
Centre Party (Senterpartiet)	4
Liberal Party (Venstre)	2
Total number of members:	21
Note: On 1 January 2020, Skodje Municipality became part of Ålesund Municipality.

Skodje kommunestyre 2011–2015
Party name (in Nynorsk)	Number of representatives
Labour Party (Arbeidarpartiet)	4
Progress Party (Framstegspartiet)	5
Conservative Party (Høgre)	4
Christian Democratic Party (Kristeleg Folkeparti)	2
Centre Party (Senterpartiet)	4
Liberal Party (Venstre)	2
Total number of members:	21

Skodje kommunestyre 2007–2011
Party name (in Nynorsk)	Number of representatives
Labour Party (Arbeidarpartiet)	4
Progress Party (Framstegspartiet)	7
Conservative Party (Høgre)	3
Centre Party (Senterpartiet)	5
Liberal Party (Venstre)	2
Total number of members:	21

Skodje kommunestyre 2003–2007
Party name (in Nynorsk)	Number of representatives
Labour Party (Arbeidarpartiet)	4
Progress Party (Framstegspartiet)	6
Conservative Party (Høgre)	2
Christian Democratic Party (Kristeleg Folkeparti)	3
Centre Party (Senterpartiet)	3
Liberal Party (Venstre)	3
Total number of members:	21

Skodje kommunestyre 1999–2003
Party name (in Nynorsk)	Number of representatives
Labour Party (Arbeidarpartiet)	5
Progress Party (Framstegspartiet)	2
Conservative Party (Høgre)	2
Christian Democratic Party (Kristeleg Folkeparti)	4
Centre Party (Senterpartiet)	4
Liberal Party (Venstre)	4
Total number of members:	21

Skodje kommunestyre 1995–1999
Party name (in Nynorsk)	Number of representatives
Labour Party (Arbeidarpartiet)	5
Conservative Party (Høgre)	4
Christian Democratic Party (Kristeleg Folkeparti)	4
Centre Party (Senterpartiet)	5
Liberal Party (Venstre)	3
Total number of members:	21

Skodje kommunestyre 1991–1995
Party name (in Nynorsk)	Number of representatives
Labour Party (Arbeidarpartiet)	4
Progress Party (Framstegspartiet)	2
Conservative Party (Høgre)	5
Christian Democratic Party (Kristeleg Folkeparti)	4
Centre Party (Senterpartiet)	4
Socialist Left Party (Sosialistisk Venstreparti)	1
Liberal Party (Venstre)	1
Total number of members:	21

Skodje kommunestyre 1987–1991
Party name (in Nynorsk)	Number of representatives
Labour Party (Arbeidarpartiet)	5
Progress Party (Framstegspartiet)	3
Conservative Party (Høgre)	4
Christian Democratic Party (Kristeleg Folkeparti)	3
Centre Party (Senterpartiet)	3
Liberal Party (Venstre)	3
Total number of members:	21

Skodje kommunestyre 1983–1987
Party name (in Nynorsk)	Number of representatives
Labour Party (Arbeidarpartiet)	5
Conservative Party (Høgre)	5
Christian Democratic Party (Kristeleg Folkeparti)	4
Centre Party (Senterpartiet)	3
Liberal Party (Venstre)	4
Total number of members:	21

Skodje kommunestyre 1979–1983
Party name (in Nynorsk)	Number of representatives
Labour Party (Arbeidarpartiet)	4
Conservative Party (Høgre)	5
Christian Democratic Party (Kristeleg Folkeparti)	4
Centre Party (Senterpartiet)	4
Liberal Party (Venstre)	4
Total number of members:	21

Skodje heradsstyre 1963–1964
Party name (in Nynorsk)	Number of representatives
Local List(s) (Lokale lister)	17
Total number of members:	17
Note: From 1965-1977, Skodje Municipality was a part of Ørskog Municipality.

Skodje heradsstyre 1959–1963
Party name (in Nynorsk)	Number of representatives
Local List(s) (Lokale lister)	17
Total number of members:	17

Skodje heradsstyre 1955–1959
Party name (in Nynorsk)	Number of representatives
Local List(s) (Lokale lister)	17
Total number of members:	17

Skodje heradsstyre 1951–1955
Party name (in Nynorsk)	Number of representatives
Labour Party (Arbeidarpartiet)	2
Joint List(s) of Non-Socialist Parties (Borgarlege Felleslister)	4
Local List(s) (Lokale lister)	10
Total number of members:	16

Skodje heradsstyre 1947–1951
Party name (in Nynorsk)	Number of representatives
Labour Party (Arbeidarpartiet)	2
Local List(s) (Lokale lister)	14
Total number of members:	16

Skodje heradsstyre 1945–1947
Party name (in Nynorsk)	Number of representatives
Labour Party (Arbeidarpartiet)	2
Local List(s) (Lokale lister)	14
Total number of members:	16

Skodje heradsstyre 1937–1941*
Party name (in Nynorsk)	Number of representatives
Labour Party (Arbeidarpartiet)	2
Local List(s) (Lokale lister)	10
Total number of members:	12
Note: Due to the German occupation of Norway during World War II, no elections were held for new municipal councils until after the war ended in 1945.

=== Mayors ===
The mayor (Nynorsk: ordførar) of Skodje Municipality was the political leader of the municipality and the chairperson of the municipal council. The following people have held this position:

- 1849–1852: Sivert Pedersen Flaathe
- 1853–1855: Christen Sorte
- 1856–1861: Ludvig Daae (V)
- 1862–1865: Christen Sorthe
- 1866–1867: Johan Slyngstad
- 1868–1869: Ludvig Daae (V)
- 1870–1873: Christen Sorthe
- 1874–1877: Johan Slyngstad
- 1878–1879: Knud Stafset
- 1880–1881: Johan Slyngstad
- 1882–1885: Amund Skodje
- 1886–1891: Knud Stafset
- 1891–1892: Rasmus Hagen
- 1892–1893: Knud Stafset
- 1893–1895: Amund Skodje
- 1895–1897: Arne Langset
- 1898–1898: Knud Stafset
- 1898–1899: Rasmus Hagen
- 1899–1900: D. Liset
- 1901–1901: D. Hagen
- 1902–1902: Ole P. Klokk
- 1903–1912: Andreas Langnes
- 1913–1922: Lars J. Valde
- 1923–1924: Trygve Brusdal
- 1925–1925: Johan Salkjelsvik
- 1926–1928: Andreas Langnes
- 1929–1934: Lars J. Valde
- 1935–1941: Rasmus Øvstegård
- 1948–1961: Trygve Brusdal
- 1961–1965: Jostein Valde
- (1965–1977: part of Ørskog Municipality)
- 1977–1983: Otto Berg
- 1983–1987: Torunn Möisæter (H)
- 1987–1991: Haldor Aasebø (KrF)
- 1991–1995: Per Stette
- 1995–2003: Ole Stokke (V)
- 2003–2007: Terje Vadset (FrP)
- 2007–2011: Modolf Hareide (Sp)
- 2011–2015: Terje Vadset (FrP)
- 2015–2019: Dag Olav Tennfjord (H)

== Economy ==
Skodje Municipality's economy was mostly based on agriculture and forestry, but there was also industry, lumber, and furniture-industry located there. By the 21st century, some industries had relocated from the nearby town of Ålesund to Skodje. Skodje had a young population, where 60% of the people were under the age of 40.

== See also ==
- List of former municipalities of Norway
