= Hellevik Lighthouse =

Lighthouse in Norway

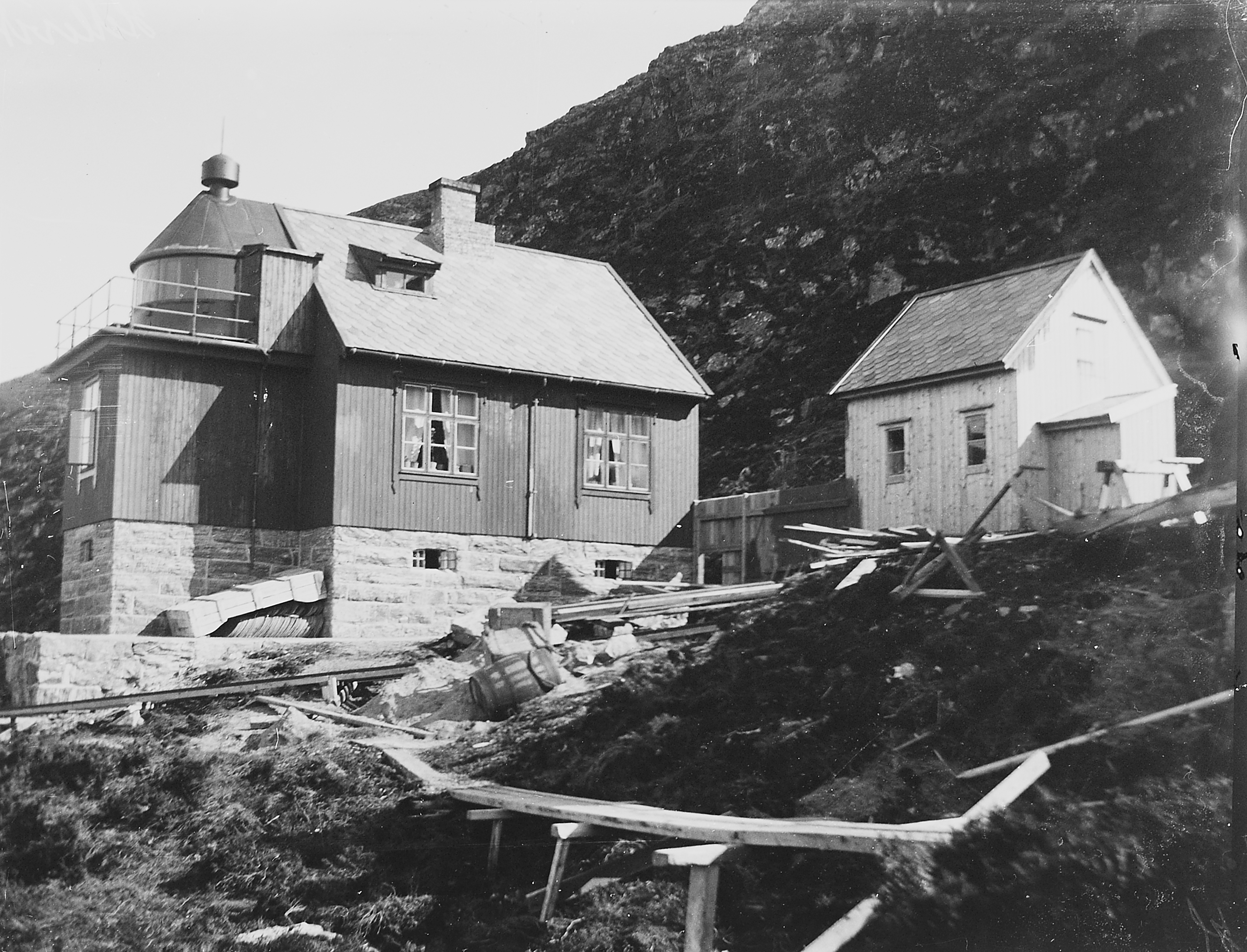
- Location: Lepsøya, Haram Municipality, Norway
- Coordinates: 62°38′11″N 6°10′34″E

Tower
- Constructed: 1881
- Construction: lumber
- Automated: 1973
- Height: 7 m (23 ft)
- Shape: square
- Markings: white (tower), red (lantern)
- Heritage: heritage site
- Current light
- Construction: metal
- Height: 6 m (20 ft)
- Shape: truncated square pyramid
- Markings: white (tower), red (lantern)
- First lit: 1988
- Focal height: 13 m (43 ft)
- Range: 10 nmi (19 km; 12 mi) (white), 7 nmi (13 km; 8.1 mi) (red), 7 nmi (13 km; 8.1 mi) (green)
- Characteristic: Oc WRG 6s

Hellevik Lighthouse (Norwegian: Hellevik fyr) is a coastal lighthouse in Haram Municipality in Møre og Romsdal, Norway. It was first established in 1880, and was automated in 1973. The lighthouse was replaced by a smaller automated light in 1988. The 6-metre (20 ft) tall tower has a light on top that emits a white, red or green light, depending on direction, occulting once every 6 seconds. The present lighthouse is located about 400 metres (1,300 ft) west of the original lighthouse building.

== See also ==
- List of lighthouses in Norway
- Lighthouses in Norway
