= Hamnsund Church =

Church in Møre og Romsdal, Norway

- Hamnsund kyrkje
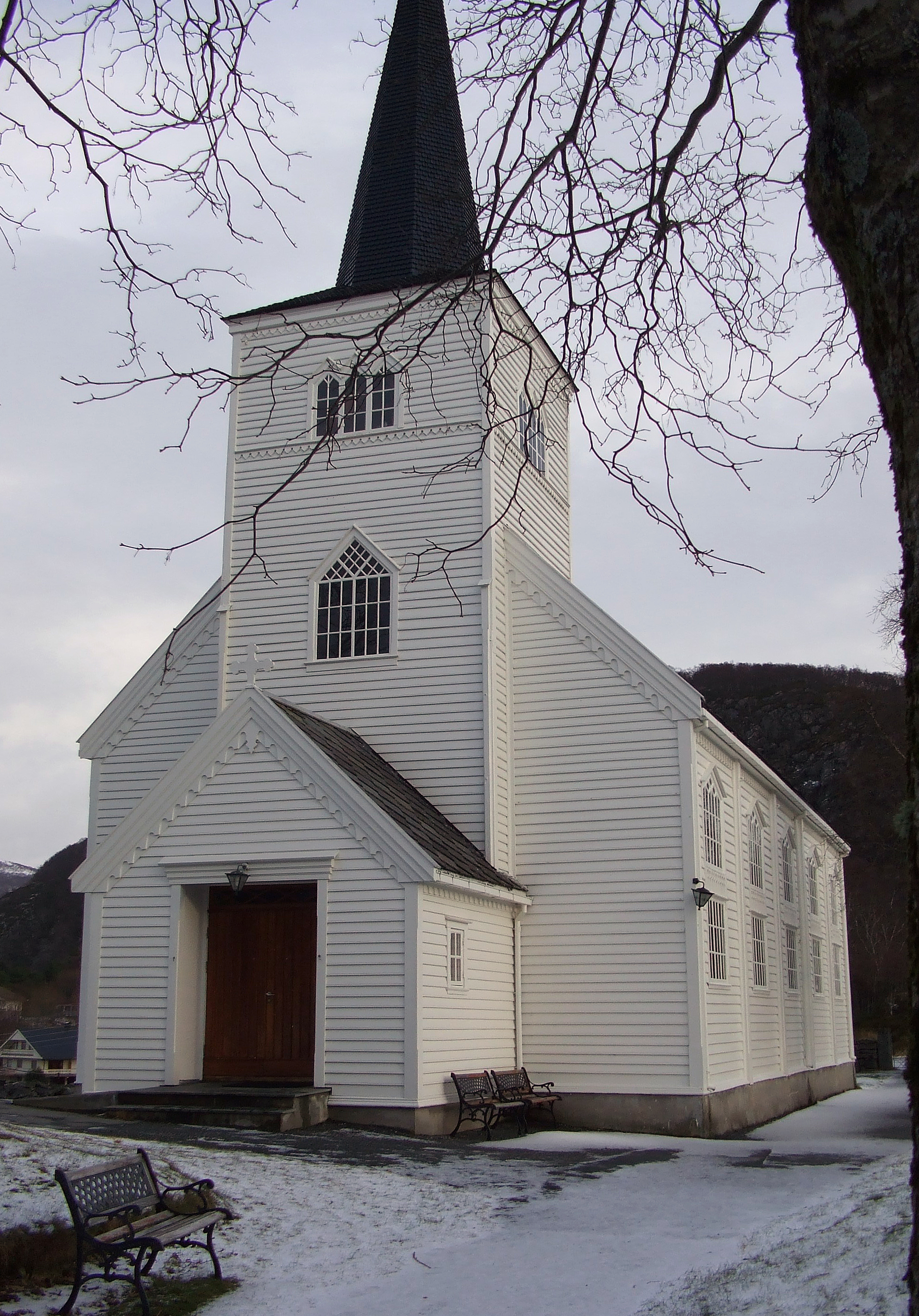
- View of the church
- Hamnsund Church
- 62°31′55″N 6°16′08″E
- Location: Haram Municipality, Møre og Romsdal
- Country: Norway
- Denomination: Church of Norway
- Churchmanship: Evangelical Lutheran

History
- Status: Parish church
- Founded: 1875
- Consecrated: 1875

Architecture
- Functional status: Active
- Architect: Hagbart Brinchmann
- Architectural type: Long church
- Completed: 1875 (151 years ago)

Specifications
- Capacity: 350
- Materials: Wood

Administration
- Diocese: Møre bispedømme
- Deanery: Nordre Sunnmøre prosti
- Parish: Hamnsund
- Norwegian Cultural Heritage Site
- Type: Church
- Status: Not protected
- ID: 84476

Hamnsund Church (Norwegian: Hamnsund kyrkje) is a parish church of the Church of Norway in Haram Municipality in Møre og Romsdal county, Norway. It is located in the village of Søvik. It is the church for the Hamnsund parish which is part of the Nordre Sunnmøre prosti (deanery) in the Diocese of Møre. The white, wooden church was built in a long church design in 1875 using plans drawn up by the architect Hagbart Brinchmann. The church seats about 350 people.

== History ==
The people of the Søvik area were part of the Borgund Church parish for a long time. In 1866, it was transferred into the newly created Vatne Church parish. On 19 April 1873, the parish was given permission to establish a chapel at Søvik. The building was designed by Hagbart Brinchmann and it was constructed by the lead builder Knut Stokkeland. It was consecrated in 1875. In 1957, the chapel was expanded and upgraded to the status of a parish church. During the construction, a new choir and sacristy. Before the addition, the choir was set up in the same room as the nave.

== See also ==
- List of churches in Møre
