= Nordbyen Church =

Church in Møre og Romsdal, Norway

- Nordbyen kyrkje
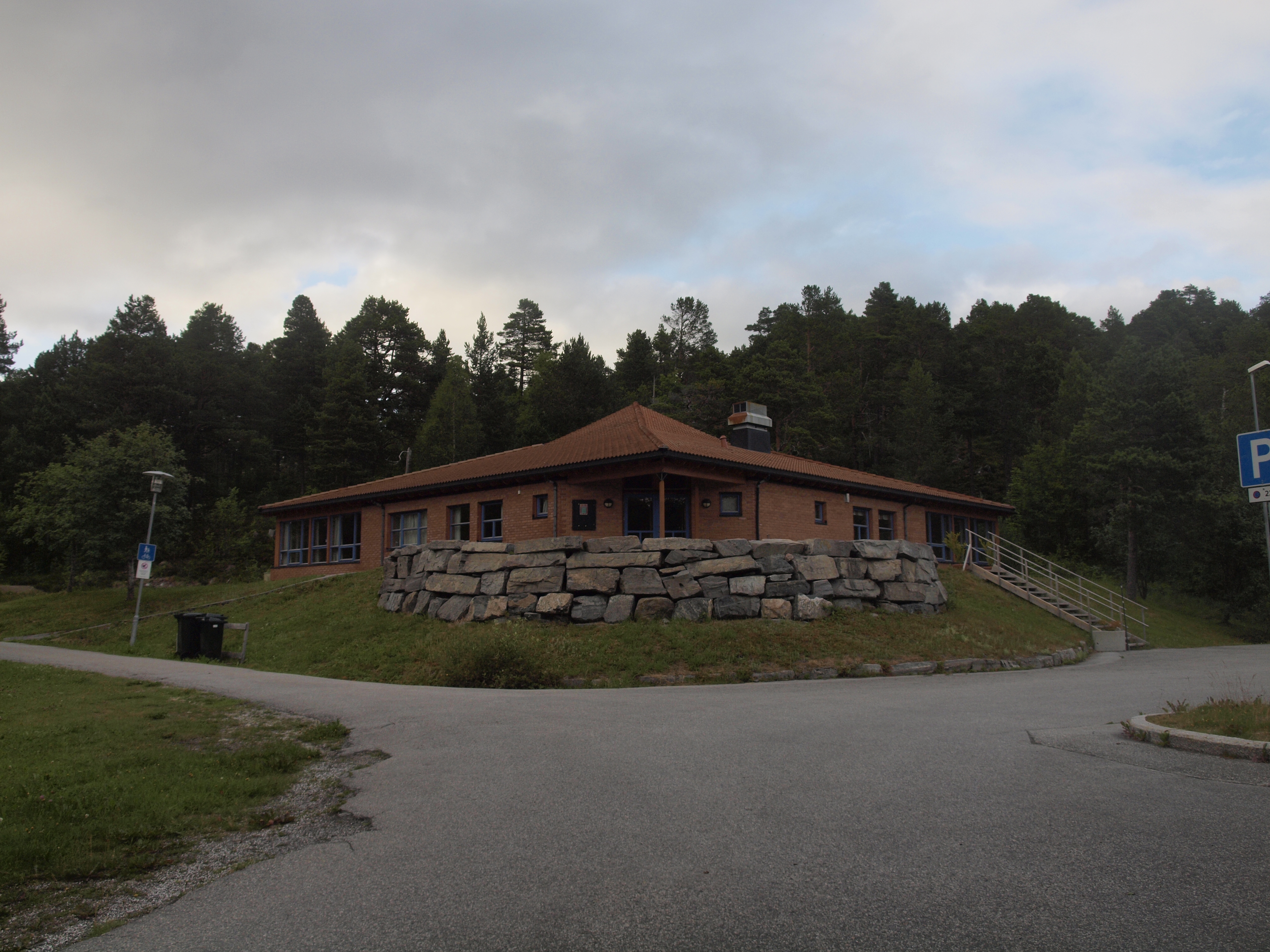
- View of the church
- Nordbyen Church
- 62°45′18″N 7°13′32″E
- Location: Molde Municipality, Møre og Romsdal
- Country: Norway
- Denomination: Church of Norway
- Churchmanship: Evangelical Lutheran

History
- Status: Parish church
- Founded: 1995
- Consecrated: 2006

Architecture
- Functional status: Active
- Architectural type: Fan-shaped
- Completed: 1995 (31 years ago)

Specifications
- Materials: Wood

Administration
- Diocese: Møre bispedømme
- Deanery: Molde domprosti
- Parish: Bolsøy
- Norwegian Cultural Heritage Site
- Type: Church
- Status: Automatically protected

Nordbyen Church (Norwegian: Nordbyen kyrkje) is a parish church of the Church of Norway in Molde Municipality in Møre og Romsdal county, Norway. It is located in the Nordbyen area of the town of Molde. It is one of the churches for the Bolsøy parish which is part of the Molde domprosti (arch-deanery) in the Diocese of Møre. The red, brick building was built in 1995 as a school using plans drawn up by the architect Asbjørn Bua who worked at the architectural firm BBW.

== History ==
The building was originally constructed in 1995 as a school. It was built in collaboration between the municipality and the parish. The agreement was that the municipality was given the use of the building for ten years as a school, and following that, the parish would take over the building. In 2005, the parish took over the building and remodeled it into a church. The new nave has a fan-shaped design. The church was consecrated on 5 March 2006 by the Bishop Odd Bondevik. The church is now used for worship services once per month as well as for Sunday school and confirmation instruction.

== See also ==
- List of churches in Møre
