= Betty Mouat =

Scottish knitter and maritime disaster survivor

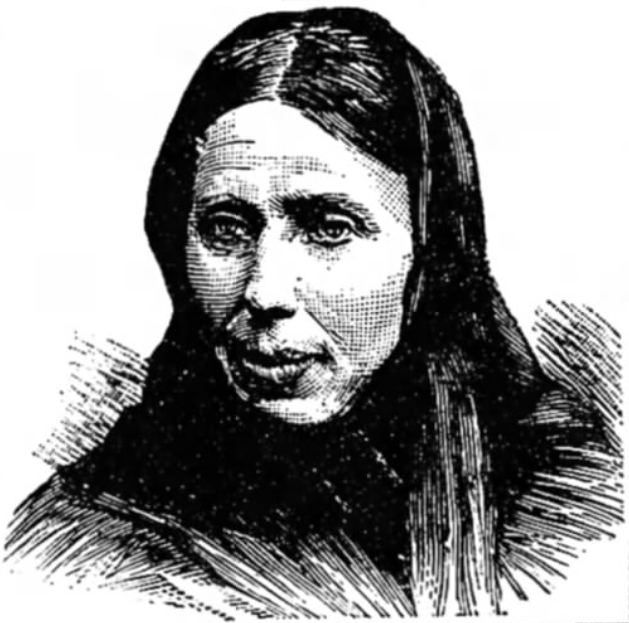
- 1886 portrait of Betty Mouat
- Born: Elizabeth Mouat c. 1825; Levenwick, Scotland
- Died: 6 February 1918 (aged 93); Dunrossness, Scotland
- Occupations: Spinner, knitter

Elizabeth Mouat (c. 1825 – 6 February 1918) of Shetland was a spinner and hand knitter who gained fame at the age of 59 when she found herself alone in a boat and drifted across the North Sea to Norway.

== Biography ==
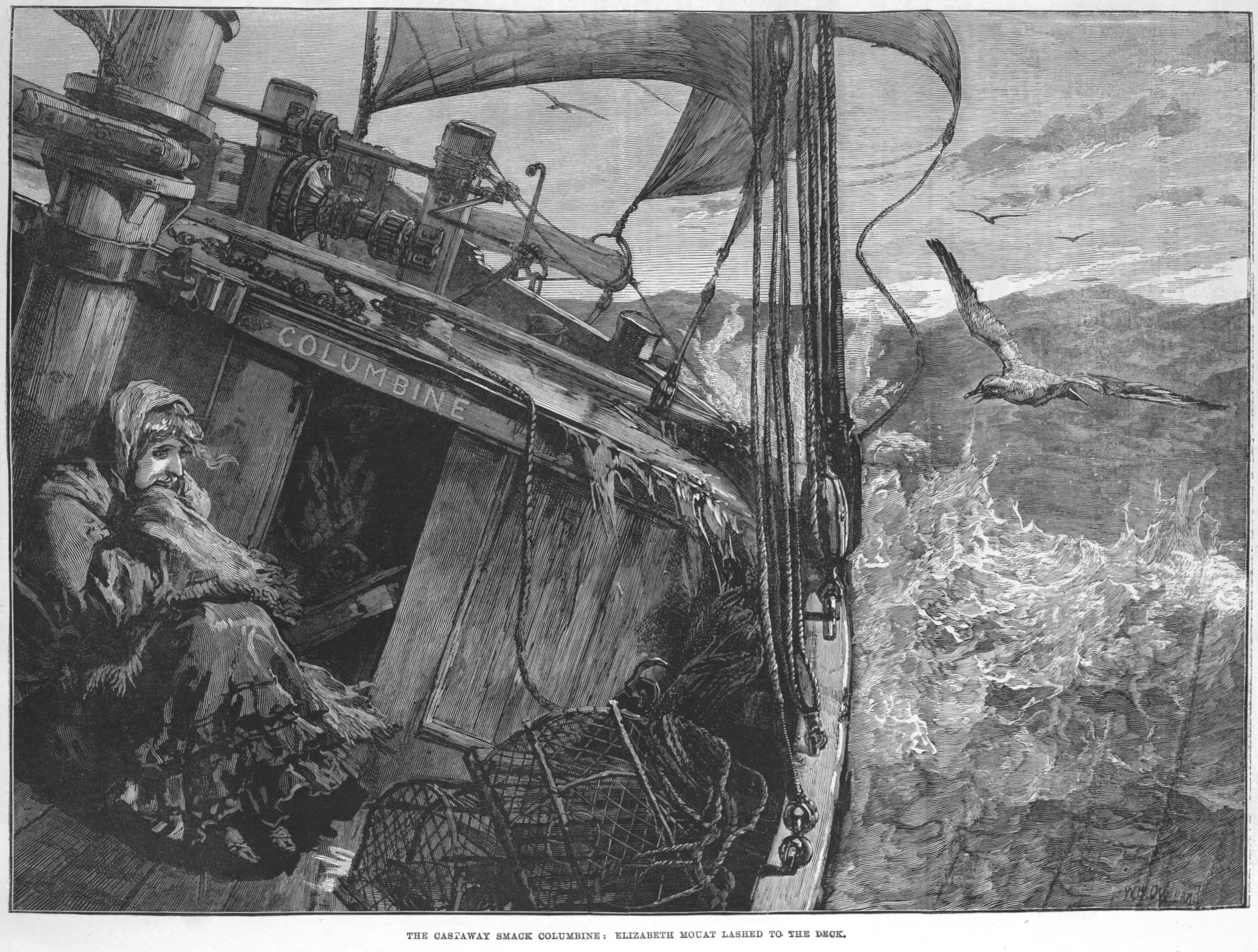
The Castaway Smack Columbine, Elizabeth Mouat lashed to the deck, William Heysham Overend for The Illustrated London News

She was born in Levenwick, Shetland to Margaret and Thomas Mouat, a shoemaker and fisherman. On Saturday 30 January 1886 she was the sole passenger on the smack Columbine sailing from Grutness to Lerwick where she planned to visit her sister, sell her knitting and to visit a doctor following a recent stroke. The weather quickly turned bad, and the skipper was washed over board. The other two crew members launched a small boat in an unsuccessful attempt to rescue him, and were unable to return to the Columbine which was still under some sail. They returned safely to shore.

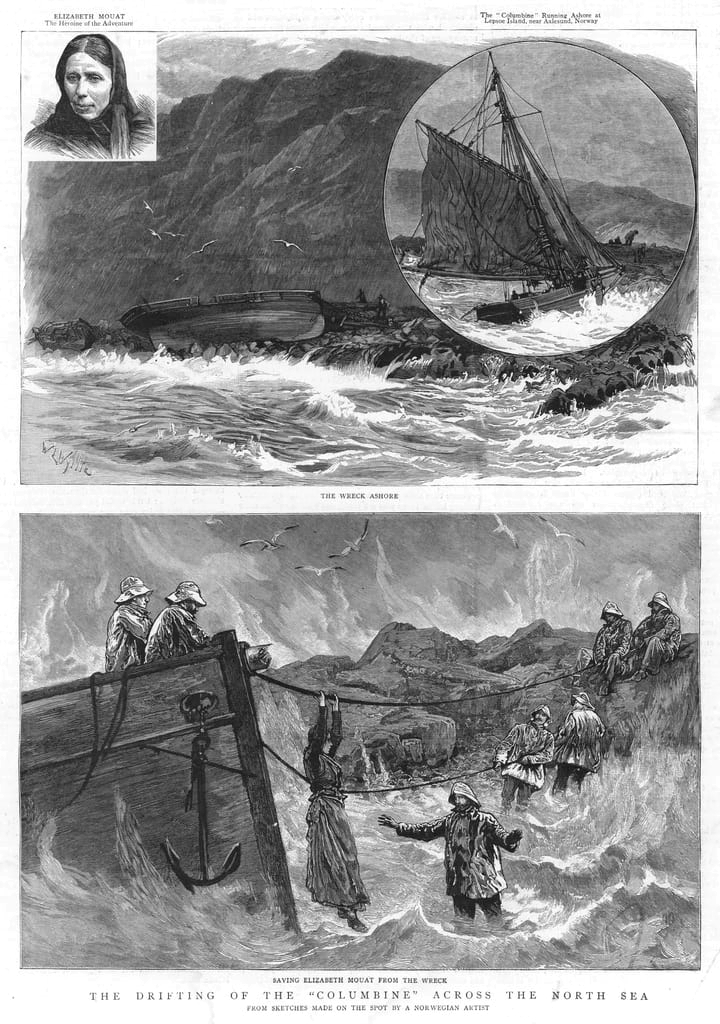
The Drifting of the "Columbine" Across the North Sea, by William Lionel Wyllie for The Graphic

Despite having little in the way of provisions, just two biscuits and a quart of milk which she made last until Wednesday, Betty survived for nine days at sea until the Columbine ran aground off the coast of Norway at Lepsøya near the town of Ålesund where she was rescued by fishermen. She received a great welcome when she returned to Edinburgh, and later in Lerwick. Subscription lists were opened for Betty, and Queen Victoria sent a letter and commanded Sir Henry Ponsonby to forward Miss Mouat a cheque for £20.

Windsor Castle, March 27, 1886. The Queen has been much touched by the account of the sufferings of Miss Mouat, and was pleased to learn by her brother's letter of the 20th inst. that she is recovering her strength.

The clerk of the council sent a letter of thanks to the people of Lepsøya and others:

That the best thanks of the Corporation of the Burgh of Lerwick, on behalf of the Corporation and as representing the community, be conveyed, in the first place, to the brave men of Lepsoe who nobly and at so much risk rescued the poor woman from the wreck, and carried her over a difficult and dangerous path to their homes, and to the kindly people of Lepsoe generally for their generous attention to and the careful nursing of her in her forlorn and helpless condition....

A shawl that Betty had knitted and which had been with her on her voyage was exhibited on the Shetland stall at the Edinburgh Exhibition later that year.

Betty Mouat died 32 years later on 6 February 1918 in Dunrossness, Shetland, at the age of 93.

== Legacy ==
Two books tell the story of Betty's voyage: Drifting Alone to Norway — The Amazing Adventure of Betty Mouat (1996) by T.M.Y. Manson and The Lone Voyage of Betty Mouat (1973) by Roderick Grant. In Norway, a copper plaque commemorates the event near the place where Columbine grounded. A memorial stone marks her grave in the churchyard in Dunrossness, and her cottage is now used as a camping bothy.
