= Fjørtoft Church =

Church in Møre og Romsdal, Norway

- Fjørtoft kyrkje
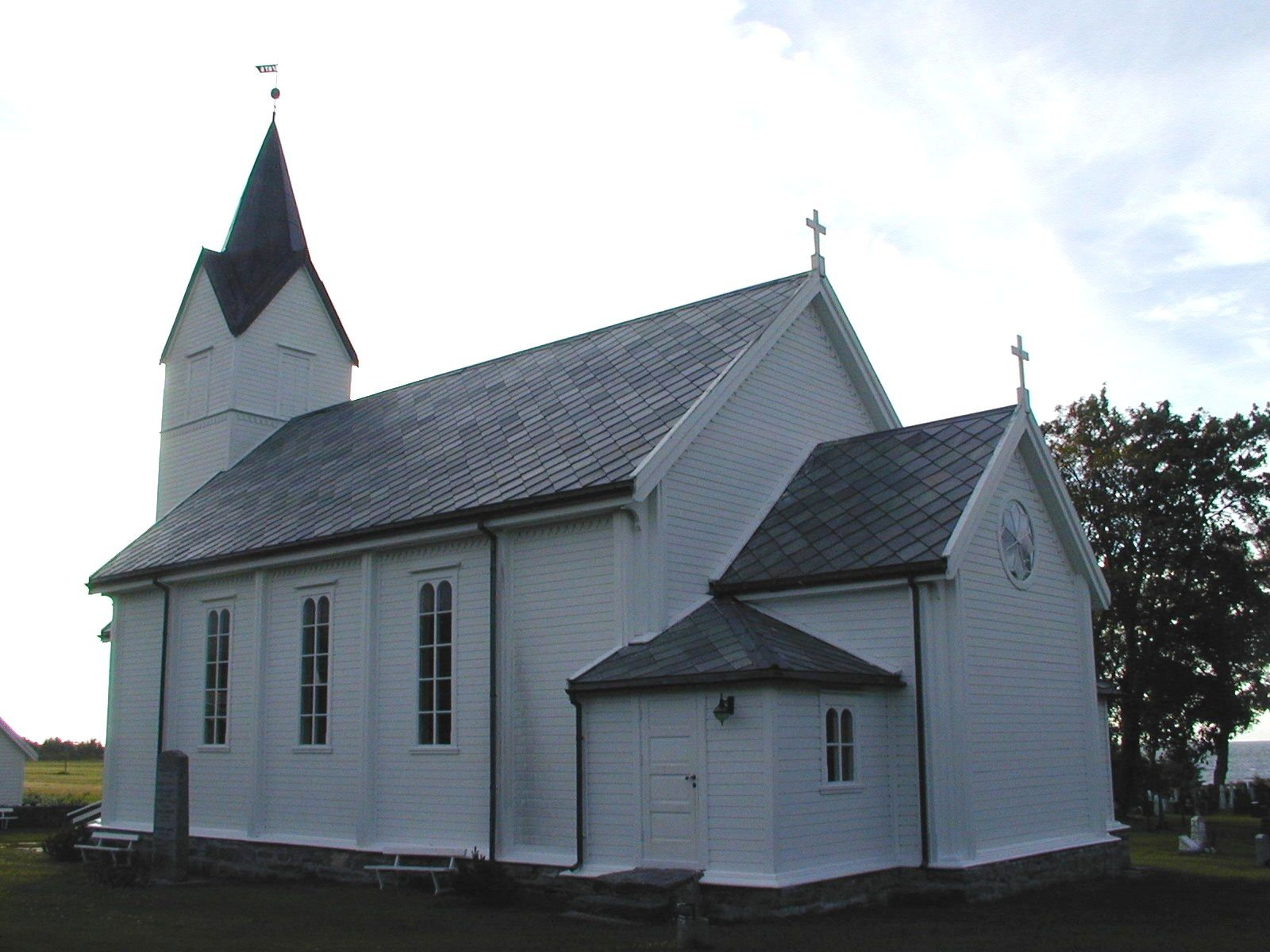
- View of the church
- Fjørtoft Church
- 62°42′22″N 6°22′30″E
- Location: Haram Municipality, Møre og Romsdal
- Country: Norway
- Denomination: Church of Norway
- Churchmanship: Evangelical Lutheran

History
- Status: Parish church
- Founded: 16th century
- Consecrated: 22 November 1878

Architecture
- Functional status: Active
- Architect: Johannes Henrik Nissen
- Architectural type: Long church
- Completed: 1878 (148 years ago)

Specifications
- Capacity: 200
- Materials: Wood

Administration
- Diocese: Møre bispedømme
- Deanery: Nordre Sunnmøre prosti
- Parish: Fjørtoft
- Norwegian Cultural Heritage Site
- Type: Church
- Status: Not protected
- ID: 84154

Fjørtoft Church (Norwegian: Fjørtoft kyrkje) is a parish church of the Church of Norway in Haram Municipality in Møre og Romsdal county, Norway. It is located on the northern side of the small island of Fjørtofta. It is one of the churches for the Haram og Fjørtoft parish which is part of the Nordre Sunnmøre prosti (deanery) in the Diocese of Møre. The white, wooden church was built in a long church design in 1878 using plans drawn up by the architect Johannes Henrik Nissen. The church seats about 200 people.

== History ==
The earliest existing historical records of the church date back around the year 1600, but the stave church was not new that year. The old church bell has an inscription on it and the date 1520, so it is possible that that is when the church was first constructed on the island of Fjørtofta. Local tradition says that the original church was built by a local nobleman who built it to serve the residents of the island. In the 1600s, it was described as a small wooden building that served the 134 people living on the island at that time. Records show that in 1622, the parish priest came to the church to hold worship services once every 15 weeks. In 1659, the church was described as a long church with a low, peat roof. In the 1760s, the church was remodeled with a new timber-framed choir and the ceiling height in the nave was raised, among other things.

Residents of the island routinely buried their dead in an informal graveyard around the church, but it wasn't until 1810 that the church first received a formal consecrated graveyard. In 1878 a new church was built about 40 metres (130 ft) to the south of the old church. The new building was designed by Henrik Nissen and the lead builder was Knut Stokkeland. It had a large rectangular nave with a choir and two sacristies on the east end and a church porch with a large tower above it on the west end. The new building was consecrated on 22 November 1878. The old building was torn down after the new one was completed. In 1902, the cemetery was expanded to the east and southeast and a new stone wall with iron gates was added around the church yard. In 1914, the chapel was upgraded and re-designated as a full parish church.

== See also ==
- List of churches in Møre
