= Hildre =

Village in Haram Municipality, Norway

- Village
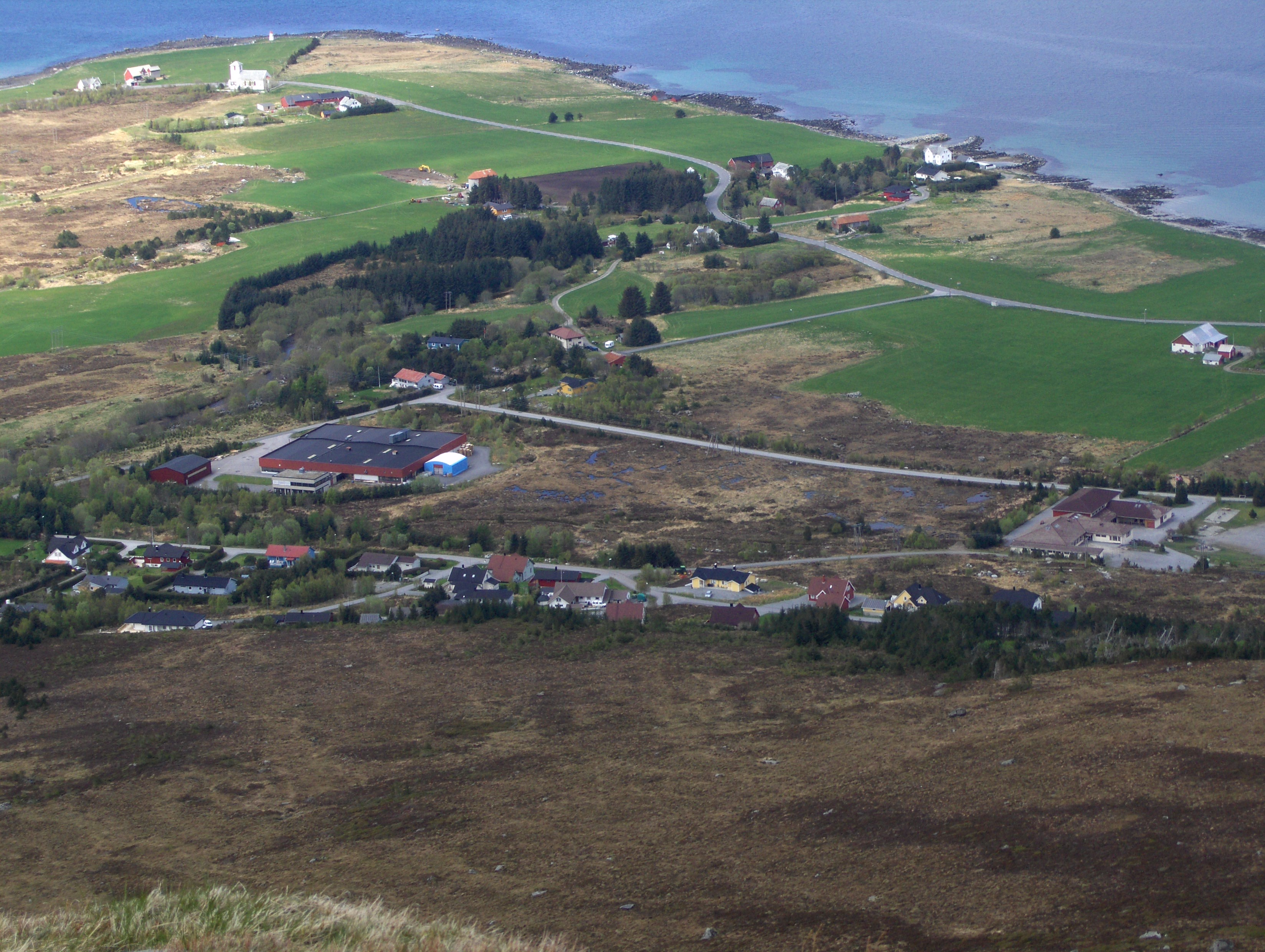
- View of Hildre in 2007
- Interactive map of Hildre
- Location within Møre og Romsdal Location within Norway
- Coordinates: 62°36′38″N 06°20′10″E
- Country: Norway
- Region: Western Norway
- County: Møre og Romsdal
- District: Sunnmøre
- Municipality: Haram Municipality
- Elevation: 11 m (36 ft)
- Time zone: UTC+01:00 (CET)
  - Summer (DST): UTC+02:00 (CEST)
- Post Code: 6272 Hildre

Hildre is a village in Haram Municipality in Møre og Romsdal county, Norway. It is also called Hildrestranda, which is also the name of the beach that stretches from Synnaland to Gamlemshaugen. Hildre Church is located in the village.

== History ==
People have lived on Hildrestranda since the migration period. At Haugneset there are remains of burial mounds. A farm history for the farms on Hildrestranda is being prepared as part of a new village book for Haram municipality. In order to carry out sea fishing on Storegga, also called Eggafiske, the Hildrestrandingen had tillers at Ulla on Haramsøya from 1778. On 1 January 2020, the area of Hildre (and all of Haram Municipality became part of Ålesund Municipality. However, on 1 January 2024, this merger was undone and the Hildre area became part of Haram Municipality once again.
