= Oddbjørn Vatne =

Norwegian politician (born 1948)

Oddbjørn Vatne (born 3 September 1948) is a Norwegian politician for the Centre Party.

He served as a deputy representative to the Norwegian Parliament from Møre og Romsdal during the terms 2001–2005 and 2005–2009. In total he met during 88 days of parliamentary session.

On the local level, he has served as mayor of Haram Municipality.
