= Hildre Church =

Church in Møre og Romsdal, Norway

- Hildre kyrkje
- Hildrestranda kyrkje
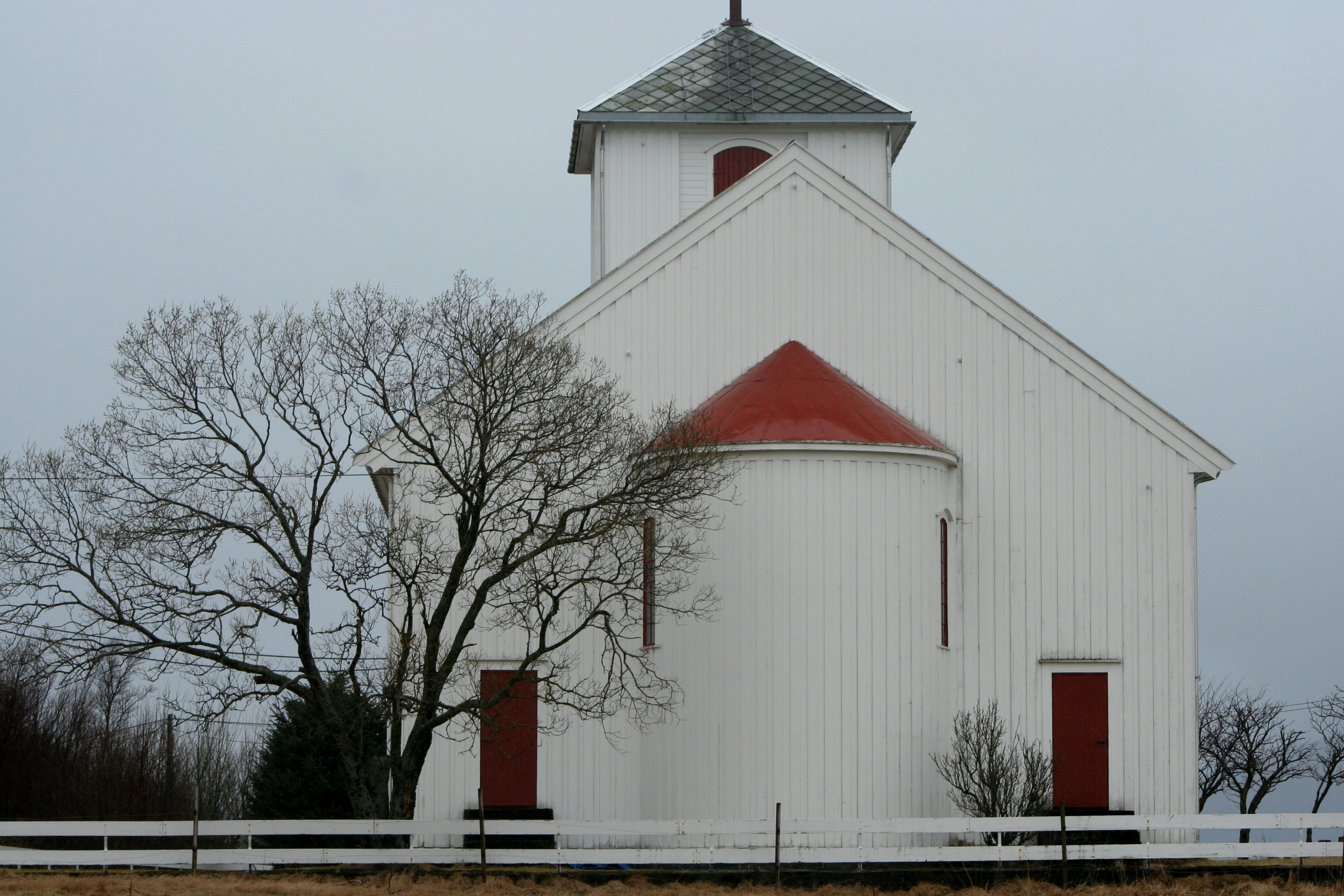
- View of the church
- Hildre Church
- 62°36′40″N 6°20′12″E
- Location: Haram Municipality, Møre og Romsdal
- Country: Norway
- Denomination: Church of Norway
- Churchmanship: Evangelical Lutheran

History
- Status: Parish church
- Founded: 1934
- Consecrated: 1934

Architecture
- Functional status: Active
- Architect: Otto Hald
- Architectural type: Long church
- Completed: 1934 (92 years ago)

Specifications
- Capacity: 385
- Materials: Wood

Administration
- Diocese: Møre bispedømme
- Deanery: Nordre Sunnmøre prosti
- Parish: Brattvåg
- Norwegian Cultural Heritage Site
- Type: Church
- Status: Listed
- ID: 84573

Hildre Church (Norwegian: Hildre kyrkje) is a parish church of the Church of Norway in Haram Municipality in Møre og Romsdal county, Norway. It is located in the village of Hildrestranda. It is one of the two churches for the Brattvåg parish which is part of the Nordre Sunnmøre prosti (deanery) in the Diocese of Møre. The white, wooden church was built in a long church design in 1934 using plans drawn up by the architect Otto Hald. The church seats about 385 people.

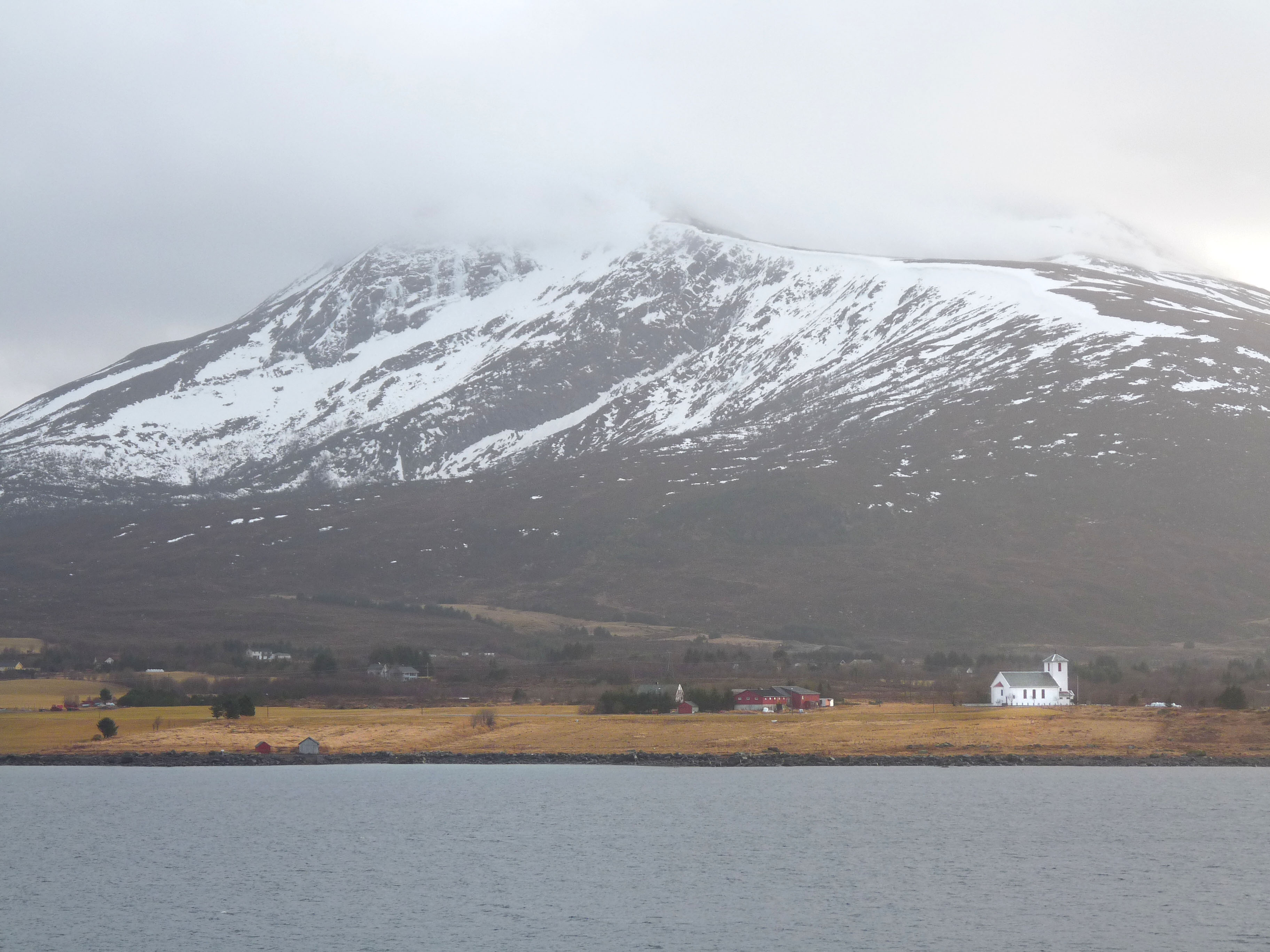
View of the church from the sea

== See also ==
- List of churches in Møre
