= Valle, Møre og Romsdal =

Village in Ålesund Municipality, Norway

Valle
- Village
- Interactive map of Valle
- Location within Møre og Romsdal Location within Norway
- Coordinates: 62.4764°N 6.6654°E
- Country: Norway
- Region: Western Norway
- County: Møre og Romsdal
- District: Sunnmøre
- Municipality: Ålesund Municipality

Area
  - Total: 0.77 km^{2} (0.30 sq mi)
- Elevation: 36 m (118 ft)

Population (2024)
  - Total: 717
  - Density: 931/km^{2} (2,410/sq mi)
- Time zone: UTC+01:00 (CET)
  - Summer (DST): UTC+02:00 (CEST)
- Post Code: 6260 Skodje

Valle is a village in Ålesund Municipality in Møre og Romsdal county, Norway. The village is located on the eastern end of the island of Uksenøya, along the northern shore of the Storfjorden. Valle sits along the European route E39/European route E136 highway, about 5 kilometres (3.1 mi) south of the village of Skodje, 28 kilometres (17 mi) east of the city of Ålesund, and 11 kilometres (6.8 mi) west of the village of Sjøholt. The historic Skodje Bridge lies about 5 kilometres (3.1 mi) to the northwest of Valle.

The 0.77-square-kilometre (190-acre) village has a population (2024) of 717 and a population density of 931 inhabitants per square kilometre (2,410/sq mi).
