= Vatne Church =

Church in Møre og Romsdal, Norway

- Vatne kyrkje
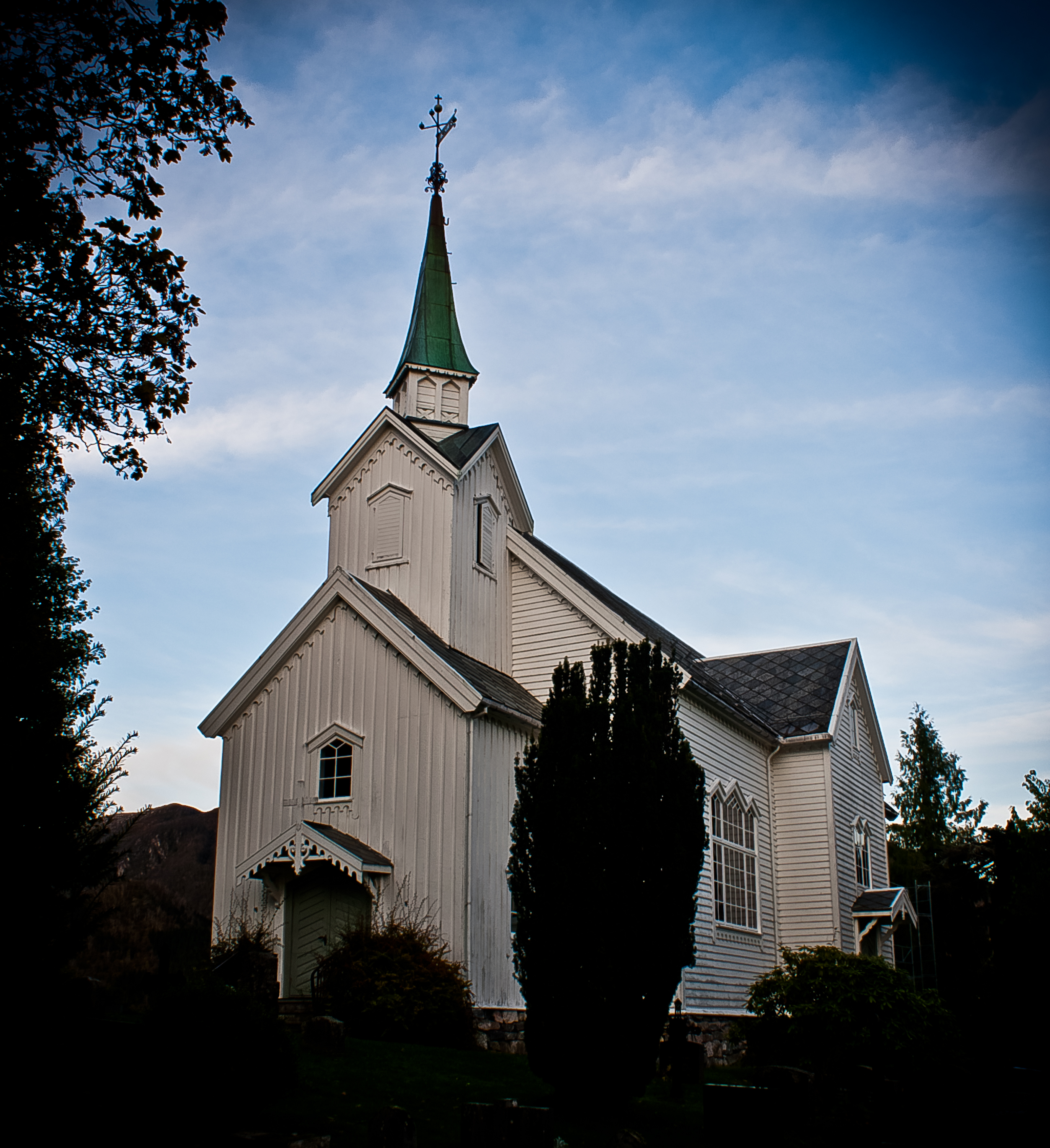
- View of the church
- Vatne Church
- 62°33′17″N 6°36′25″E
- Location: Haram Municipality, Møre og Romsdal
- Country: Norway
- Denomination: Church of Norway
- Churchmanship: Evangelical Lutheran

History
- Status: Parish church
- Founded: 14th century
- Consecrated: 13 December 1868

Architecture
- Functional status: Active
- Architect(s): Fritz Meinhardt; J.W. Nordan
- Architectural type: Long church
- Completed: 1868 (158 years ago)

Specifications
- Capacity: 550
- Materials: Wood

Administration
- Diocese: Møre bispedømme
- Deanery: Nordre Sunnmøre prosti
- Parish: Vatne
- Norwegian Cultural Heritage Site
- Type: Church
- Status: Not protected
- ID: 85782

Vatne Church (Norwegian: Vatne kyrkje) is a parish church of the Church of Norway in the village of Vatne in Haram Municipality, Møre og Romsdal county, Norway. It is the church for the Vatne parish, which is part of the Nordre Sunnmøre prosti (deanery) in the Diocese of Møre. The white, wooden church was built in a long church design in 1868 using plans drawn up by architect Fritz Meinhardt, with some input from architect Jacob Wilhelm Nordan. The church seats about 550 people.

== History ==
The earliest existing historical records of the church date back to 1432, but it was not a new church at that time. The old wooden stave church was located on the eastern side of the lake Vatnevatnet, about 1.4 kilometres (0.87 mi) to the east of the present site of the church. It may have been first constructed in the 14th century. At some point during the 1500s or 1600s, the original long church design was enlarged by adding a timber-framed transept to create a cruciform design. At the same time, the old choir was torn down and a new timber-framed choir was built in its place.

By the 1760s, the old church was in need of replacement. It was decided that new church would be constructed on a site 1.4 kilometres (0.87 mi) to the west of the old church, on the other side of the lake. The new location at Osgota would be a better, more convenient location for the residents of the parish. In 1760–1761, the old church was torn down at the old site and the new church was built, likely reusing materials from the old building. The new church was a timber-framed cruciform design. The new building was consecrated on 28 June 1761.

By the 1860s, the church had become too small for the parish. In 1868, the old church was torn down and a new church was constructed on the same site. The new church was a wooden long church that was based on the design of the nearby Skodje Church. The church was designed by the architect Fritz Meinhardt. It happens that Jacob Wilhelm Nordan is also mentioned in connection with the church construction, which likely means that Nordan corrected some of Meinhardt's drawings. The lead builder for the project was Gustav Olsen. From the outside, the church can look like a cruciform church with very short cross arms, but it is set up as a long church on the inside. The new building was consecrated on 13 December 1868.

== See also ==
- List of churches in Møre
