= Skodje (village) =

Village in Ålesund Municipality, Norway

- Village
- Interactive map of Skodje
- Location within Møre og Romsdal Location within Norway
- Coordinates: 62°30′16″N 06°41′35″E
- Country: Norway
- Region: Western Norway
- County: Møre og Romsdal
- District: Sunnmøre
- Municipality: Ålesund Municipality

Area
  - Total: 1.72 km^{2} (0.66 sq mi)
- Elevation: 42 m (138 ft)

Population (2024)
  - Total: 2,544
  - Density: 1,479/km^{2} (3,830/sq mi)
- Time zone: UTC+01:00 (CET)
  - Summer (DST): UTC+02:00 (CEST)
- Post Code: 6260 Skodje

Skodje is a village in Ålesund Municipality in Møre og Romsdal county, Norway. The village is located along the shore of the Skodjevika, an inlet off the main Ellingsøyfjorden. The village of Valle is located along European route E39/European route E136 highway just a few kilometers south of the village. Skodje Church is located in the village and the historic Skodje Bridge lies just west of the village.

The 1.72-square-kilometre (430-acre) village has a population (2024) of 2,544 and a population density of 1,479 inhabitants per square kilometre (3,830/sq mi).

== History ==
Prior to 2020, this village was the administrative centre of the old Skodje Municipality.
