= Haram Municipality =

Municipality in Møre og Romsdal, Norway

Haram Municipality Haram kommune
- Municipality
- Harham herred (historic name)
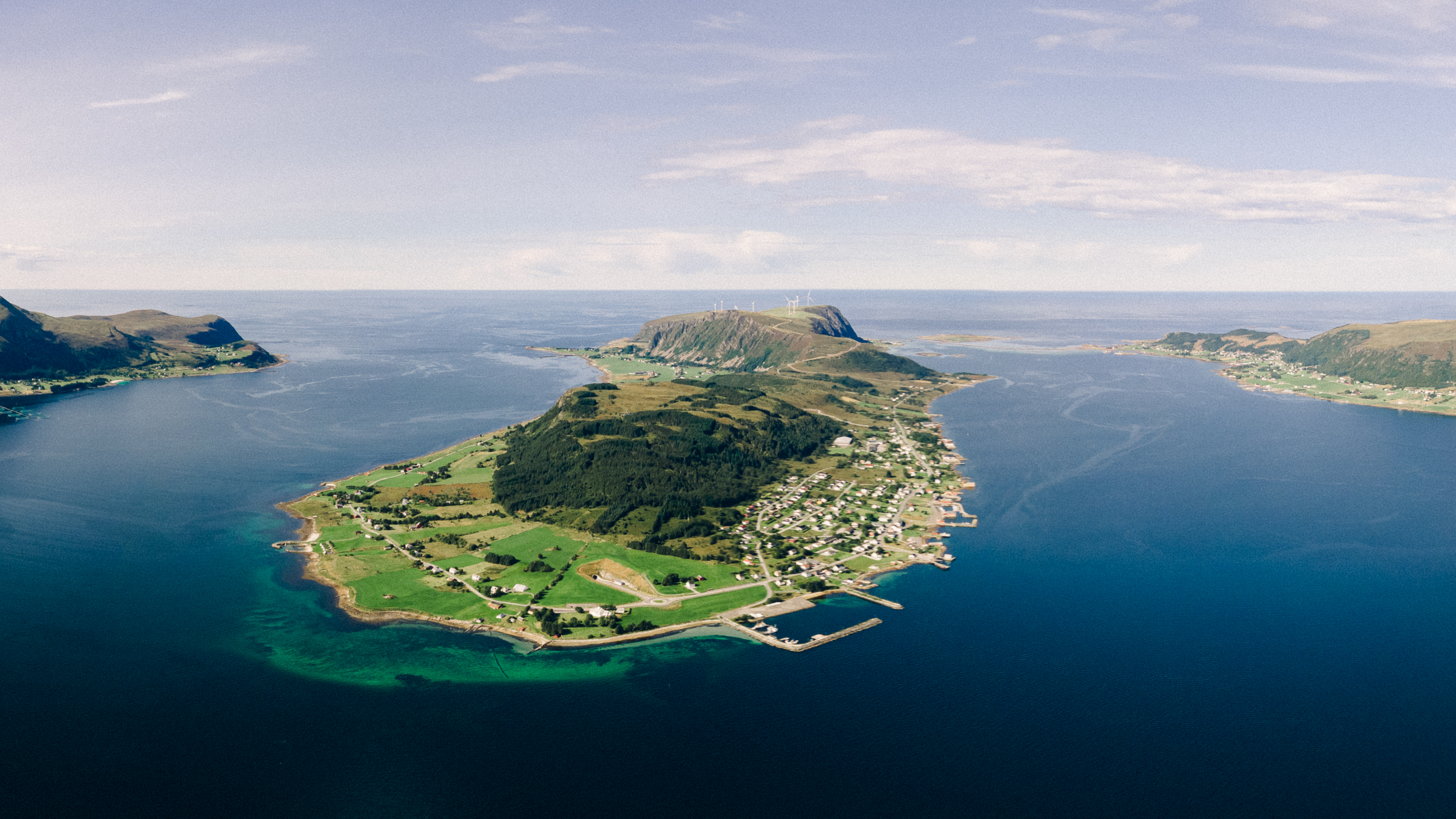
- View of Haramsøya, the island from which the municipality takes its name

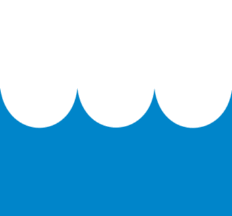
- Flag Coat of arms

- Møre og Romsdal within Norway

- Haram within Møre og Romsdal
- Coordinates: 62°34′03″N 06°22′20″E
- Country: Norway
- County: Møre og Romsdal
- District: Sunnmøre
- Established: 1 Jan 1838
  - Created as: Formannskapsdistrikt
- Disestablished: 1 Jan 2020
  - Succeeded by: Ålesund Municipality
- Re-established: 1 Jan 2024
  - Preceded by: Ålesund Municipality
- Administrative centre: Brattvåg

Government
  - Mayor (2023): Vebjørn Krogsæter (Sp)

Area
  - Total: 261.19 km^{2} (100.85 sq mi)
  - Land: 254.36 km^{2} (98.21 sq mi)
  - Water: 6.83 km^{2} (2.64 sq mi) 2.6%
  - Rank: #280 in Norway
- Highest elevation: 1,067.31 m (3,501.7 ft)

Population (2024)
  - Total: 9,357
  - Rank: #120 in Norway
  - Density: 35.8/km^{2} (93/sq mi)
  - Change (10 years): ▲ +3%
- Demonym(s): Harams-mann; Harams-kvinne; Haramsøying

Official language
  - Norwegian form: Nynorsk
- Time zone: UTC+01:00 (CET)
  - Summer (DST): UTC+02:00 (CEST)
- ISO 3166 code: NO-1534
- Website: Official website

Haram is a municipality in Møre og Romsdal county, Norway. It is part of the Sunnmøre region. The administrative center is Brattvåg, the industrial center of Sunnmøre. Other important villages in the municipality include Austnes, Eidsvik, Helle, Longva, Hildrestranda, Søvik, Tennfjord, and Vatne.

The 261-square-kilometre (101 sq mi) municipality is the 280th largest by area out of the 357 municipalities in Norway. Haram Municipality is the 120th most populous municipality in Norway with a population of 9,357. The municipality's population density is 35.8 inhabitants per square kilometre (93/sq mi) and its population has increased by 3% over the previous 10-year period.

Brattvåg IL is a sports club based in the municipality. Tennfjord Mannskor is a male choir from the village of Tennfjord.

== General information ==
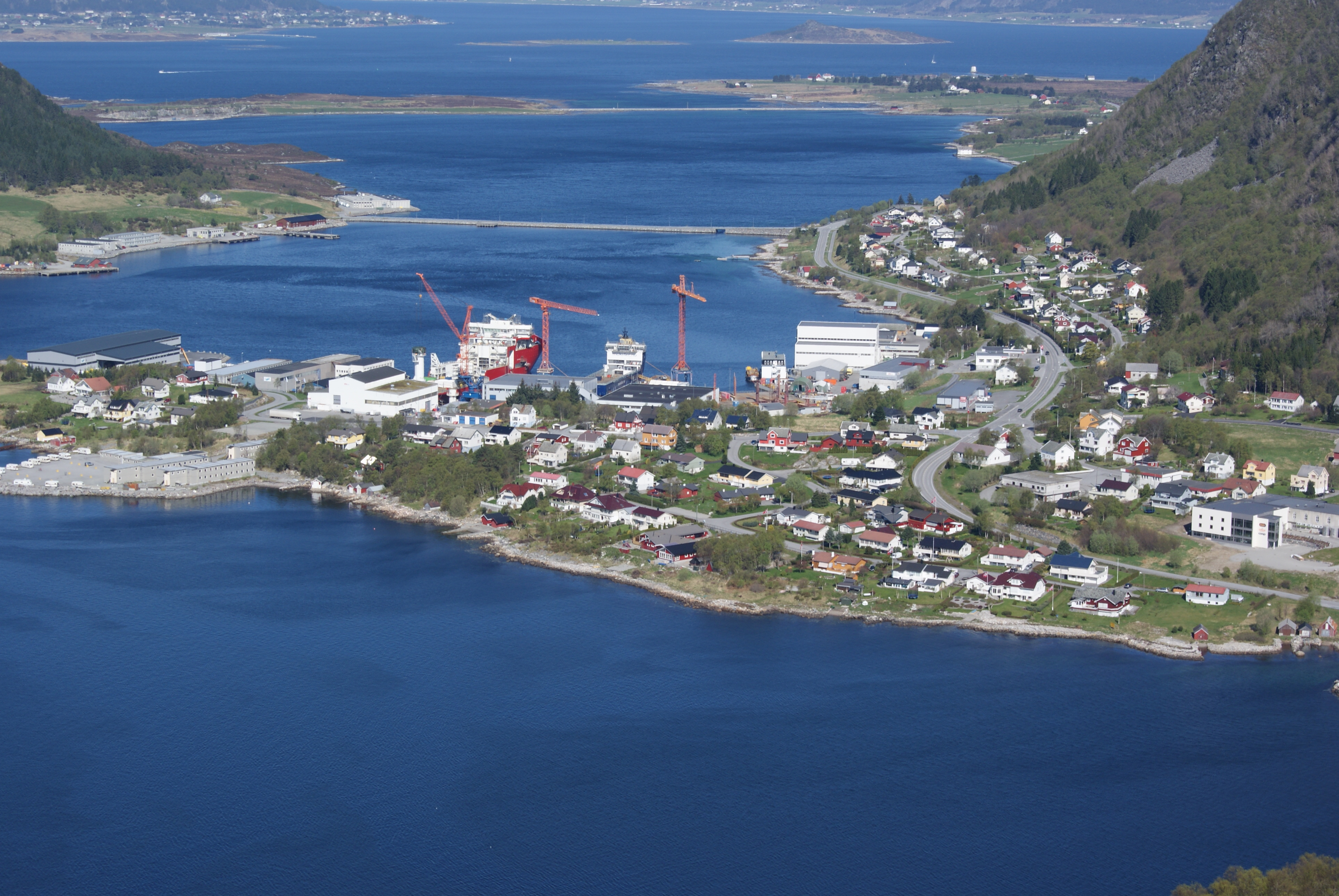
View of the village of Søvik

The parish of Harham (later spelled Haram) was established as a municipality on 1 January 1838 (see formannskapsdistrikt law). On 1 January 1890, Haram Municipality was divided into two: the western island district (population: 794) became the new Roald Municipality and the eastern district (population: 1,956) remained as Haram Municipality.

During the 1960s, there were many municipal mergers across Norway due to the work of the Schei Committee. On 1 January 1965, three municipal changes involving Haram occurred, altering the size of the municipality (and ultimately creating a much larger municipality):

- The part of Haram Municipality on the island of Harøya, including the Myklebust area and the smaller surrounding islands to the west of there (population: 287), was separated from Haram Municipality and merged into the neighboring Sandøy Municipality to the northeast.
- Most of Vatne Municipality (population: 2,260) to the southeast of Haram Municipality was merged into Haram Municipality.
- The Søvik area in Borgund Municipality (population: 1,191) to the south of Haram Municipality were merged into Haram.

On 1 January 2020, the Haram Municipality, Skodje Municipality, Ørskog Municipality, Sandøy Municipality, and Ålesund Municipality were merged to form a new, much larger Ålesund Municipality. This occurred because in June 2017, the Parliament of Norway voted to approve the merger. Soon after the merger, there was discontent among the people who had lived in the old Haram Municipality. After lots of discussions, the municipal council of the new Ålesund Municipality petitioned the government to reverse that part of the merger and to recreate Haram Municipality once again. On 3 October 2022, the Parliament of Norway approved a law to recreate Haram Municipality effective on 1 January 2024.

=== Name ===
The municipality (originally the parish) is named after the old Haram farm (Old Norse: Harhamarr) since the first Haram Church was built there. The first element is prefix har- which has an unknown meaning. The last element is hamarr which means "stone" or "steep cliff". Prior to 1889, the name was written Harham.

=== Coat of arms ===
The coat of arms was granted on 7 August 1987 and it was in use until 2020 when the municipality ceased to exist. The official blazon is "Per fess engrailed of three lobes argent and azure" (Norwegian: Delt av sølv og blått med omvend bogesnitt med tre bogar). This means the arms have are divided with a horizontal line that is engrailed three times. The field (background) below the line has a tincture of azure. Above the line, the field has a tincture of argent which means it is commonly colored white, but if it is made out of metal, then silver is used. The design was chosen to look like three waves, symbolizing the importance of the sea in this island municipality. The arms were designed by Eldar Tandstad. The municipal flag has the same design as the coat of arms.

=== Dialect ===
The dialect of the area was well known for its practice of H-dropping and the old and traditional pronunciation of the name of the municipality was [a:ram].

=== Churches ===
The Church of Norway has four parishes (sokn) within Haram Municipality. It is part of the Nordre Sunnmøre prosti (deanery) in the Diocese of Møre.

Churches in Haram Municipality
Parish (sokn)	Church name	Location of the church	Year built
Haram og Fjortoft	Haram Church	Austnes	1838
Haram og Fjortoft	Lepsøy Chapel	Lepsøya	1896
Haram og Fjortoft	Fjørtoft Church	Fjørtofta	1878
Vatne	Vatne Church	Vatne	1868
Hamnsund	Hamnsund Church	just south of Søvik	1875
Brattvåg	Brattvåg Church	Brattvåg	1977
Brattvåg	Hildre Church	Hildrestranda	1905

== Geography ==
The municipality of Haram includes many islands including Bjørnøya, Fjørtofta, Haramsøya, Løvsøya, Skuløya, and Terøya. The islands of Bjørnøya and Terøya are connected to the mainland via causeways. The islands of Haramsøya and Skuløya are connected with the Ullasund Bridge. The new Nordøyvegen bridge and tunnel network (completed in 2022) connects all of the main islands of Haram to the mainland via the Fjørtoftfjord Tunnel, Nogvafjord Tunnel, Haramsfjord Tunnel, and Lepsøy Bridge. The Haramsfjorden, Vatnefjorden, and Romsdal Fjord all flow through the municipality. The Ulla Lighthouse and Hellevik Lighthouse are both located in the northwestern part of the municipality.

The municipality shares land borders with Vestnes Municipality to the east and Ålesund Municipality to the south. The rest of the municipality is surrounded by sea. The municipality also borders (by sea) Ålesund Municipality and Molde Municipality to the northeast, Ålesund Municipality to the south, and Giske Municipality to the west. The highest point in the municipality is the 1,067.31-metre (3,501.7 ft) tall mountain Blåskjerdingen, located near the border with Vestnes Municipality.

== Government ==
Haram Municipality is responsible for primary education (through 10th grade), outpatient health services, senior citizen services, welfare and other social services, zoning, economic development, and municipal roads and utilities. The municipality is governed by a municipal council (Kommunestyre) of directly elected representatives. The mayor is indirectly elected by a vote of the municipal council. The municipality is under the jurisdiction of the Sunnmøre District Court and the Frostating Court of Appeal.

=== Municipal council ===
The municipal council of Haram Municipality is made up of 27 representatives that are elected to four year terms. The tables below show the current and historical composition of the council by political party.

Haram kommunestyre 2024–2027
Party name (in Nynorsk)	Number of representatives
Labour Party (Arbeidarpartiet)	3
Progress Party (Framstegspartiet)	4
Conservative Party (Høgre)	4
Industry and Business Party (Industri‑ og Næringspartiet)	3
Christian Democratic Party (Kristeleg Folkeparti)	1
Centre Party (Senterpartiet)	9
Socialist Left Party (Sosialistisk Venstreparti)	1
Liberal Party (Venstre)	2
Total number of members:	27
Note: On 1 January 2024, the municipality was re-established after being separated from Ålesund Municipality.

Haram kommunestyre 2015–2019
Party name (in Nynorsk)	Number of representatives
Labour Party (Arbeidarpartiet)	5
Progress Party (Framstegspartiet)	6
Green Party (Miljøpartiet Dei Grøne)	1
Conservative Party (Høgre)	5
Christian Democratic Party (Kristeleg Folkeparti)	3
Centre Party (Senterpartiet)	6
Liberal Party (Venstre)	1
Total number of members:	27
Note: On 1 January 2020, Haram Municipality became part of Ålesund Municipality.

Haram kommunestyre 2011–2015
Party name (in Nynorsk)	Number of representatives
Labour Party (Arbeidarpartiet)	5
Progress Party (Framstegspartiet)	4
Conservative Party (Høgre)	8
Christian Democratic Party (Kristeleg Folkeparti)	3
Centre Party (Senterpartiet)	5
Liberal Party (Venstre)	1
Independent election list for Haram (Uavhengig valliste for Haram)	5
Total number of members:	31

Haram kommunestyre 2007–2011
Party name (in Nynorsk)	Number of representatives
Labour Party (Arbeidarpartiet)	4
Progress Party (Framstegspartiet)	5
Conservative Party (Høgre)	10
Christian Democratic Party (Kristeleg Folkeparti)	3
Centre Party (Senterpartiet)	6
Socialist Left Party (Sosialistisk Venstreparti)	1
Liberal Party (Venstre)	2
Independent election list for Haram (Uavhengig valliste for Haram)	6
Total number of members:	37

Haram kommunestyre 2003–2007
Party name (in Nynorsk)	Number of representatives
Labour Party (Arbeidarpartiet)	5
Progress Party (Framstegspartiet)	5
Conservative Party (Høgre)	6
Christian Democratic Party (Kristeleg Folkeparti)	3
Centre Party (Senterpartiet)	8
Socialist Left Party (Sosialistisk Venstreparti)	2
Liberal Party (Venstre)	2
Independent election list for Haram (Uavhengig valliste for Haram)	6
Total number of members:	37

Haram kommunestyre 1999–2003
Party name (in Nynorsk)	Number of representatives
Labour Party (Arbeidarpartiet)	5
Progress Party (Framstegspartiet)	4
Conservative Party (Høgre)	7
Christian Democratic Party (Kristeleg Folkeparti)	6
Centre Party (Senterpartiet)	6
Socialist Left Party (Sosialistisk Venstreparti)	2
Liberal Party (Venstre)	3
Independent election list for Haram (Uavhengig valliste for Haram)	4
Total number of members:	37

Haram kommunestyre 1995–1999
Party name (in Nynorsk)	Number of representatives
Labour Party (Arbeidarpartiet)	6
Progress Party (Framstegspartiet)	3
Conservative Party (Høgre)	4
Christian Democratic Party (Kristeleg Folkeparti)	8
Centre Party (Senterpartiet)	5
Socialist Left Party (Sosialistisk Venstreparti)	1
Liberal Party (Venstre)	5
Søvik and Gamlem list (Søvik og Gamlem liste)	4
Haramsøy list (Haramsøy liste)	1
Total number of members:	37

Haram kommunestyre 1991–1995
Party name (in Nynorsk)	Number of representatives
Labour Party (Arbeidarpartiet)	4
Progress Party (Framstegspartiet)	1
Conservative Party (Høgre)	5
Christian Democratic Party (Kristeleg Folkeparti)	4
Centre Party (Senterpartiet)	2
Socialist Left Party (Sosialistisk Venstreparti)	3
Liberal Party (Venstre)	3
Søvik, Gamlem, and Grytestrand list (Søvik, Gamlem og Grytestrand liste)	5
Lepsøy list (Lepsøy liste)	2
Haramsøy list (Haramsøy liste)	2
Vestrefjord, Vatne, and Tennfjord list (Vestrefjord, Vatne og Tennfjord liste)	6
Total number of members:	37

Haram kommunestyre 1987–1991
Party name (in Nynorsk)	Number of representatives
Labour Party (Arbeidarpartiet)	8
Conservative Party (Høgre)	7
Christian Democratic Party (Kristeleg Folkeparti)	7
Centre Party (Senterpartiet)	1
Socialist Left Party (Sosialistisk Venstreparti)	1
Liberal Party (Venstre)	3
Lepsøy list (Lepsøy liste)	2
Haramsøy list (Haramsøy liste)	2
Vestrefjord, Vatne, and Tennfjord list (Vestrefjord, Vatne og Tennfjord liste)	6
Total number of members:	37

Haram kommunestyre 1983–1987
Party name (in Nynorsk)	Number of representatives
Labour Party (Arbeidarpartiet)	9
Conservative Party (Høgre)	7
Christian Democratic Party (Kristeleg Folkeparti)	8
Centre Party (Senterpartiet)	2
Socialist Left Party (Sosialistisk Venstreparti)	1
Liberal Party (Venstre)	3
Haramsøy list (Haramsøy liste)	3
Vestrefjord, Vatne, and Tennfjord list (Vestrefjord, Vatne og Tennfjord liste)	4
Total number of members:	37

Haram kommunestyre 1979–1983
Party name (in Nynorsk)	Number of representatives
Labour Party (Arbeidarpartiet)	6
Conservative Party (Høgre)	8
Christian Democratic Party (Kristeleg Folkeparti)	8
New People's Party (Nye Folkepartiet)	1
Centre Party (Senterpartiet)	5
Socialist Left Party (Sosialistisk Venstreparti)	1
Liberal Party (Venstre)	3
Election list for Vestfjord, Vatne, and Tennfjord (Valliste for Vestrefjord, Vatne og Tennfjord)	4
Election list for Skuløy, Flemsøy, Haramsøy, and Lepsøy (Valliste for Skuløy, Flemsøy, Haramsøy og Lepsøy)	1
Total number of members:	37

Haram kommunestyre 1975–1979
Party name (in Nynorsk)	Number of representatives
Labour Party (Arbeidarpartiet)	5
Conservative Party (Høgre)	4
Christian Democratic Party (Kristeleg Folkeparti)	7
New People's Party (Nye Folkepartiet)	1
Centre Party (Senterpartiet)	8
Socialist Left Party (Sosialistisk Venstreparti)	1
Liberal Party (Venstre)	4
Election list for Vestfjord, Vatne, and Tennfjord (Valliste for Vestrefjord, Vatne og Tennfjord)	3
Election list for Gamlem, Søvik, and Grytestranda (Valliste for Gamlem, Søvik og Grytestranda)	2
Election list for Lepsøy (Valliste for Lepsøy)	2
Total number of members:	37

Haram kommunestyre 1971–1975
Party name (in Nynorsk)	Number of representatives
Labour Party (Arbeidarpartiet)	7
Conservative Party (Høgre)	2
Christian Democratic Party (Kristeleg Folkeparti)	7
Centre Party (Senterpartiet)	5
Socialist People's Party (Sosialistisk Folkeparti)	1
Liberal Party (Venstre)	6
Local List(s) (Lokale lister)	9
Total number of members:	37

Haram kommunestyre 1967–1971
Party name (in Nynorsk)	Number of representatives
Labour Party (Arbeidarpartiet)	7
Conservative Party (Høgre)	1
Christian Democratic Party (Kristeleg Folkeparti)	7
Centre Party (Senterpartiet)	3
Socialist People's Party (Sosialistisk Folkeparti)	1
Liberal Party (Venstre)	7
Local List(s) (Lokale lister)	11
Total number of members:	37

Haram kommunestyre 1963–1967
Party name (in Nynorsk)	Number of representatives
Labour Party (Arbeidarpartiet)	2
Local List(s) (Lokale lister)	19
Total number of members:	21

Haram heradsstyre 1959–1963
Party name (in Nynorsk)	Number of representatives
Labour Party (Arbeidarpartiet)	2
Local List(s) (Lokale lister)	19
Total number of members:	21

Haram heradsstyre 1955–1959
Party name (in Nynorsk)	Number of representatives
Local List(s) (Lokale lister)	21
Total number of members:	21

Haram heradsstyre 1951–1955
Party name (in Nynorsk)	Number of representatives
Labour Party (Arbeidarpartiet)	1
Local List(s) (Lokale lister)	19
Total number of members:	20

Haram heradsstyre 1947–1951
Party name (in Nynorsk)	Number of representatives
Local List(s) (Lokale lister)	20
Total number of members:	20

Haram heradsstyre 1945–1947
Party name (in Nynorsk)	Number of representatives
Labour Party (Arbeidarpartiet)	4
Local List(s) (Lokale lister)	16
Total number of members:	20

Haram heradsstyre 1937–1941*
Party name (in Nynorsk)	Number of representatives
Labour Party (Arbeidarpartiet)	5
Local List(s) (Lokale lister)	15
Total number of members:	20
Note: Due to the German occupation of Norway during World War II, no elections were held for new municipal councils until after the war ended in 1945.

=== Mayors ===
The mayor (Nynorsk: ordførar) of Haram Municipality is the political leader of the municipality and the chairperson of the municipal council. Here is a list of people who have held this position:

- 1838–1841: Sjur Olsen Hatlemark
- 1842–1851: Carl Sjursen Haram
- 1852–1857: Nils Rasmussen Aakre
- 1858–1862: Jens Kobro Daae
- 1863–1867: Nils Rasmussen Aakre
- 1868–1878: Hans Rasmussen Vestre
- 1879–1900: Nils Ingebrigtsen Alvestad (V)
- 1901–1911: Nils Nilsen Aakre (V)
- 1911–1912: Knudt Severin Jonas Olsen Otterlei (V)
- 1913–1921: Ole Rasmus Knutsen Flem (V)
- 1922–1925: Knudt Severin Jonas Olsen Otterlei (V)
- 1926–1928: Martinus Eriksen Otterlei
- 1929–1934: Karl Gunnarson Rogne (V)
- 1935–1941: Ole Johanson Skjelten
- 1941–1945: Martinus Kjerstad (NS)
- 1945–1955: Lars Larsson Fjørtoft (V)
- 1984–1985: Robert Hurlen (H)
- 1986–1988: Svein Ottar Sandal (KrF)
- 1989–1989: Knut Wahl (Ap)
- 1990–1991: Robert Hurlen (H)
- 1992–1999: Margrethe Tennfjord (KrF)
- 1999–2007: Oddbjørn Vatne (Sp)
- 2007–2015: Bjørn Sandnes (H)
- 2015–2019: Vebjørn Krogsæter (Sp)
- (2020–2023: Haram Municipality was part of Ålesund Municipality)
- 2024–present: Vebjørn Krogsæter (Sp)

== Media gallery ==
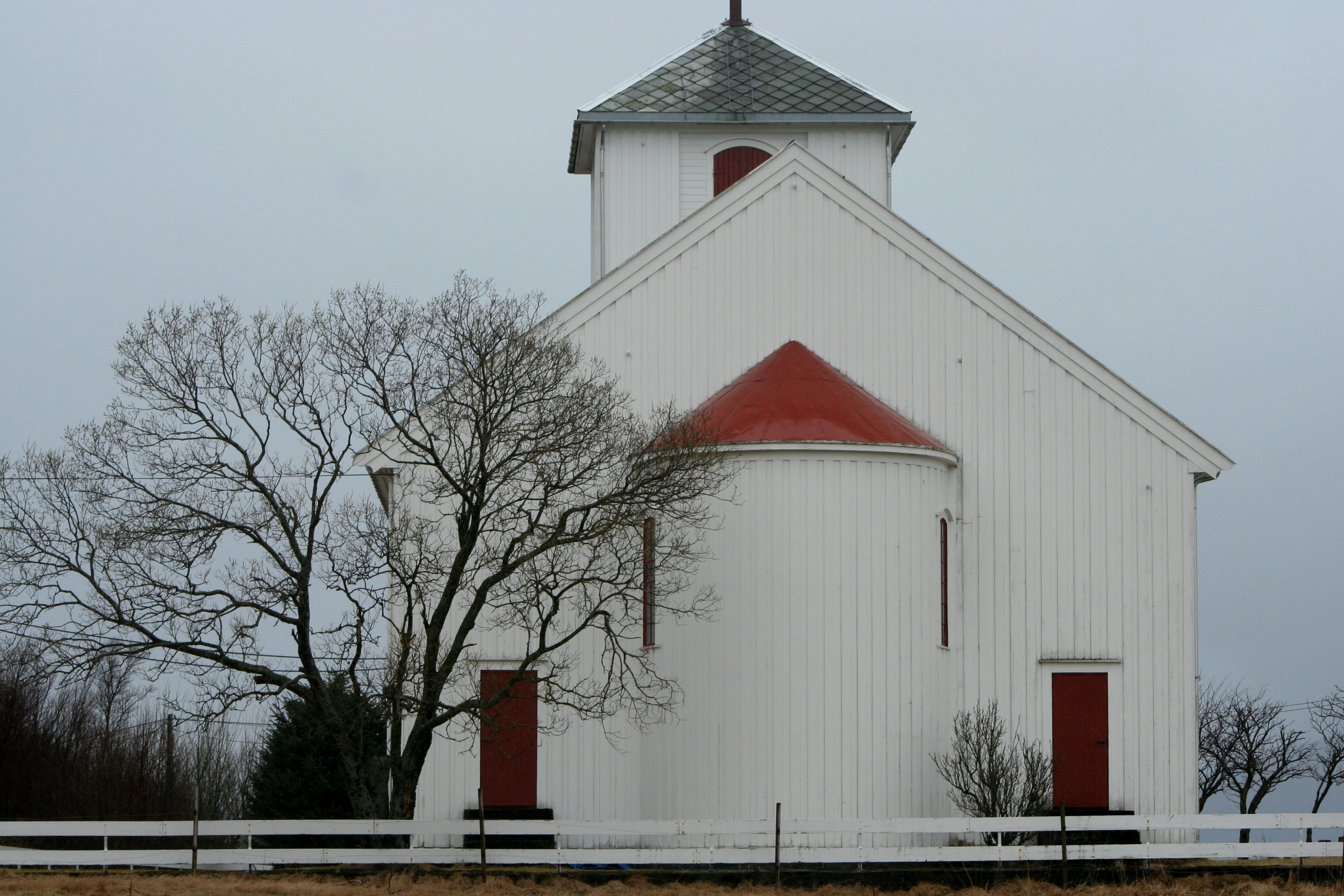
Hildre Church near Brattvåg

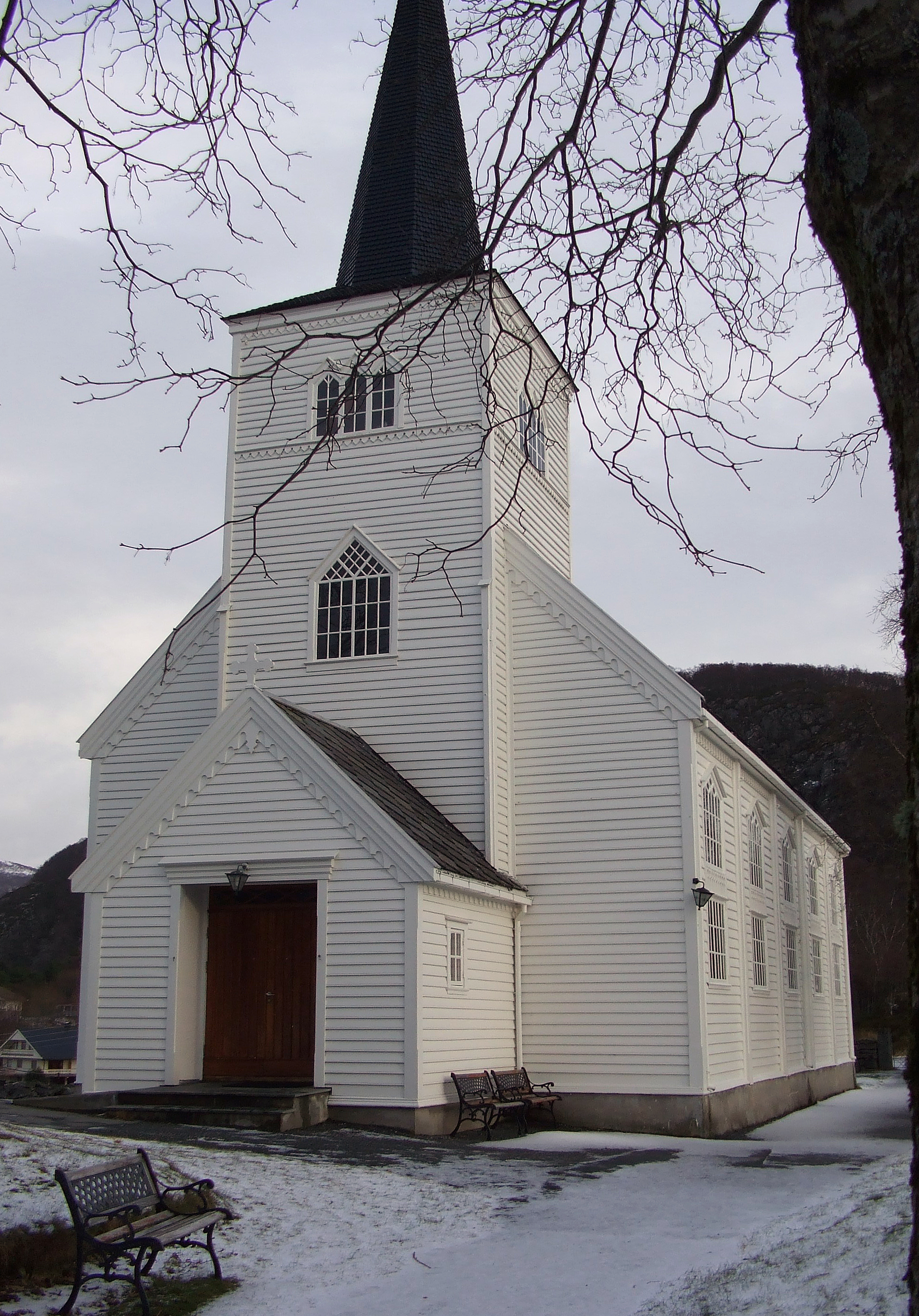
Hamnsund Church near Søvik

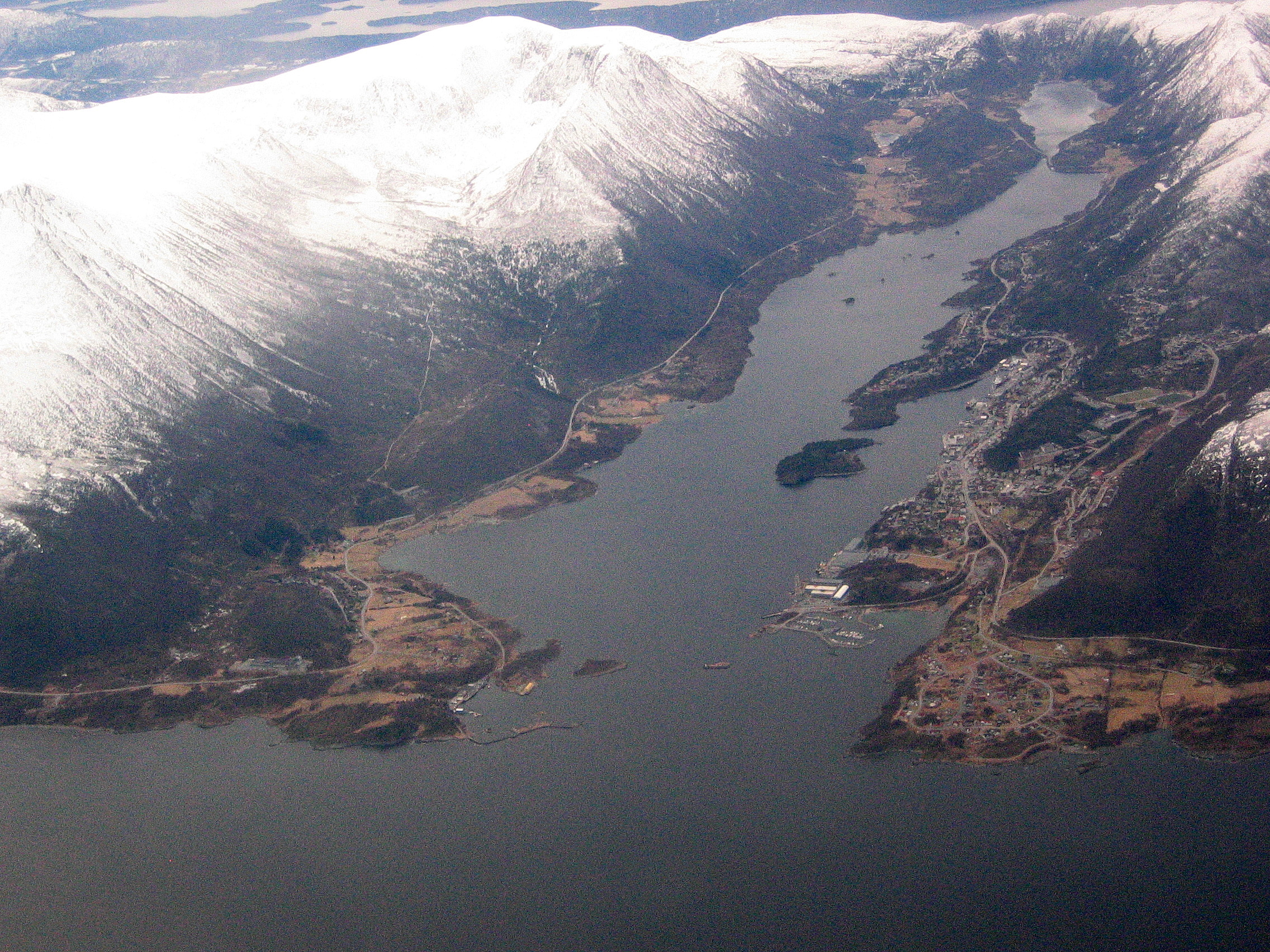
View of Brattvåg village

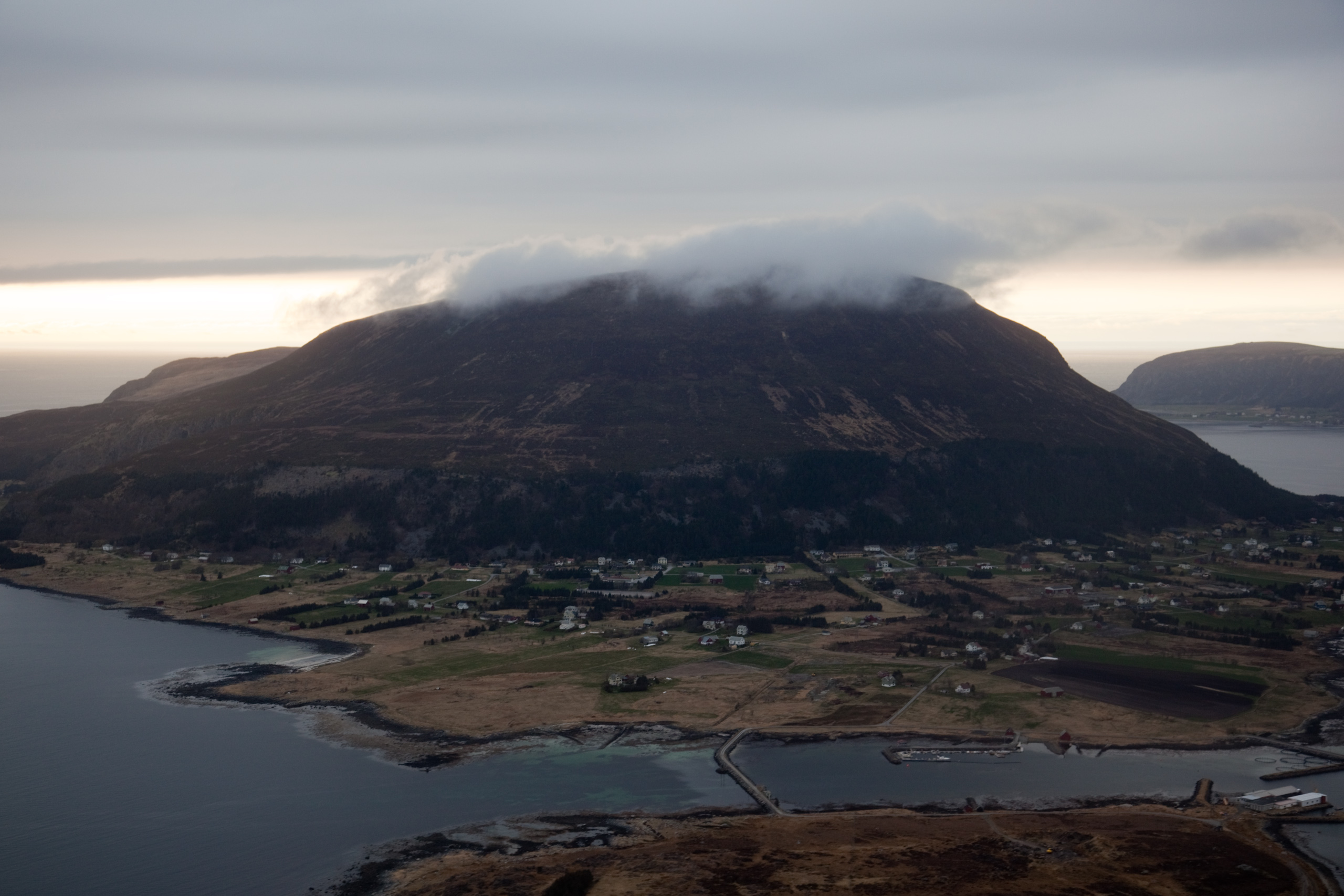
View of Lepsøya island
