= Skodje Church =

Church in Møre og Romsdal, Norway

- Skodje kyrkje
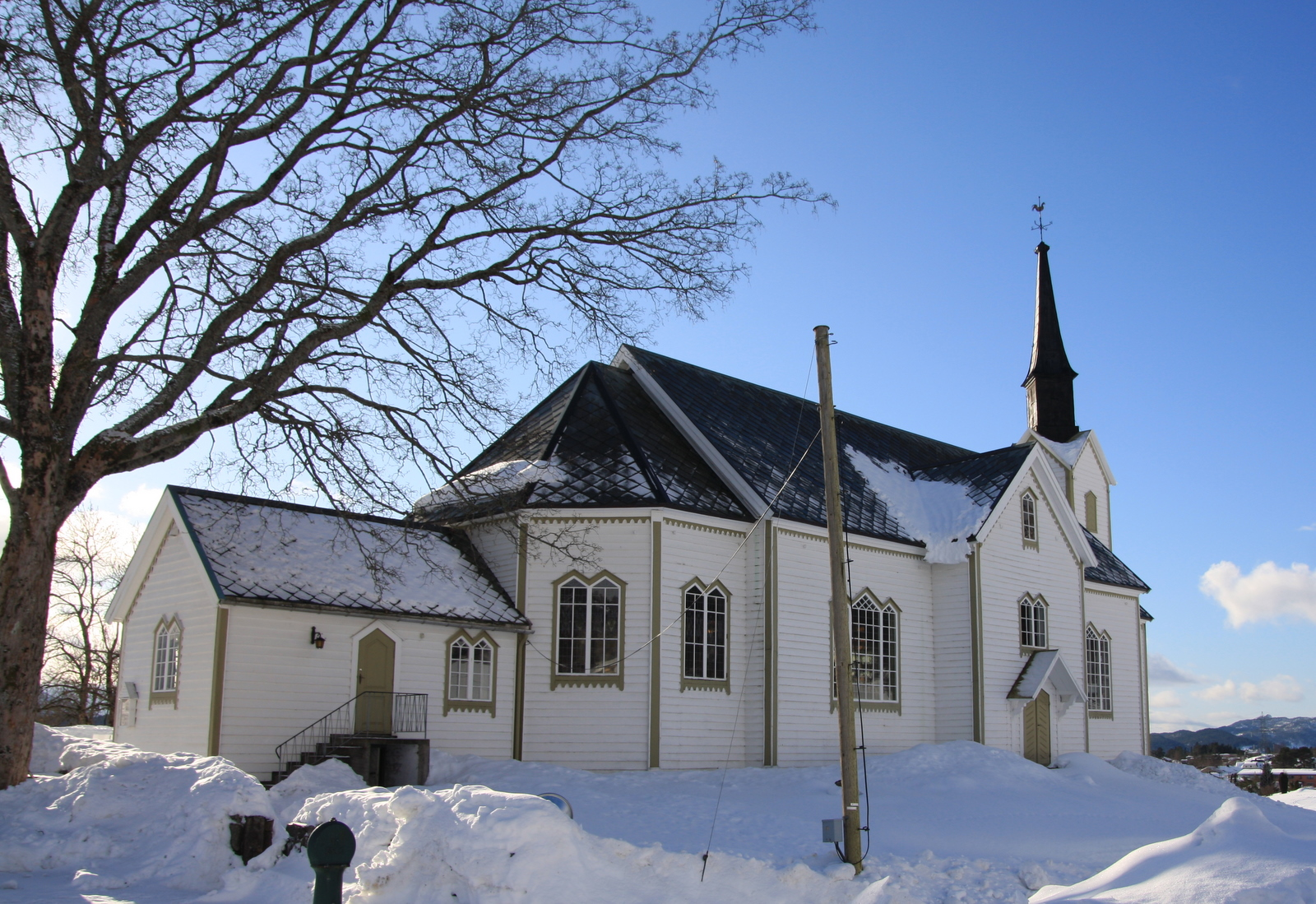
- View of the church
- Skodje Church
- 62°30′22″N 6°41′50″E
- Location: Ålesund Municipality, Møre og Romsdal
- Country: Norway
- Denomination: Church of Norway
- Churchmanship: Evangelical Lutheran

History
- Status: Parish church
- Founded: 1860
- Consecrated: 1860

Architecture
- Functional status: Active
- Architect: Fritz Meinhardt
- Architectural type: Long church
- Completed: 1860 (166 years ago)

Specifications
- Capacity: 330
- Materials: Wood

Administration
- Diocese: Møre bispedømme
- Deanery: Nordre Sunnmøre prosti
- Parish: Skodje
- Norwegian Cultural Heritage Site
- Type: Church
- Status: Listed
- ID: 85471

Skodje Church (Norwegian: Skodje kyrkje) is a parish church of the Church of Norway in Ålesund Municipality in Møre og Romsdal county, Norway. It is located in the village of Skodje. It is the church for the Skodje parish which is part of the Nordre Sunnmøre prosti (deanery) in the Diocese of Møre. The white, wooden church was built in a long church design in 1860 using plans drawn up by the architect Fritz Meinhardt. The church seats about 330 people.

== History ==
The earliest existing historical records of the church date back to 1432, but the church was not new that year. The first church in Skodje was a wooden stave church that may have been built in 14th century. The church was originally a long church design, but some time during the early-1600s, the church was remodeled by adding a timber-framed transepts to the north and south sides of the nave which ultimately created a cruciform floor plan. In 1750 the old church was in such poor condition that it was torn down and a new timber-framed, cruciform church was built on the same site. In 1859 this church too was torn down, and the present church building was constructed. This new church was designed by Fritz Meinhardt and built by the builders Gjert Lien and Alias Tonning. The new church was consecrated in 1860.

== See also ==
- List of churches in Møre
