= Lepsøya =

Island in Møre og Romsdal, Norway

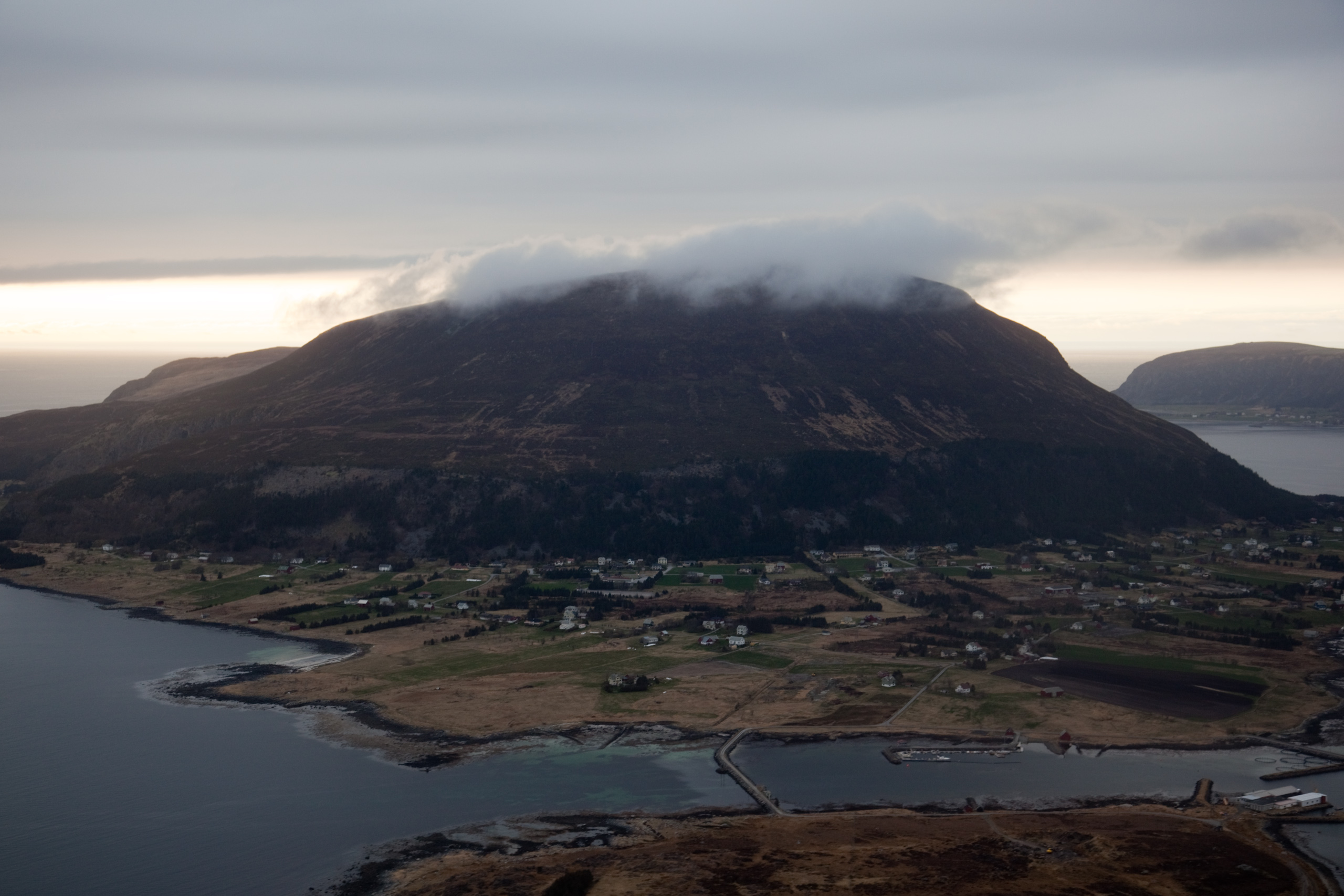
- View of the island
- Interactive map of Lepsøya

Geography
- Location: Møre og Romsdal, Norway
- Coordinates: 62.6213°N 6.1699°E
- Area: 12.1 km^{2} (4.7 sq mi)
- Length: 5.7 km (3.54 mi)
- Width: 3 km (1.9 mi)
- Highest elevation: 490 m (1610 ft)
- Highest point: Goaldet

Administration
- Norway
- County: Møre og Romsdal
- Municipality: Haram Municipality

Demographics
- Population: 316 (2024)

Lepsøya is a populated island in Haram Municipality in Møre og Romsdal county, Norway. The 12.1-square-kilometre (4.7 sq mi) island in the northern part of the municipality. It is located in the ocean in the northwestern part of the municipality, with the Haramsfjorden and the island of Haramsøya to the northeast; the Vigrafjorden and the island of Vigra (in Giske Municipality) to the southwest; and the islands of Bjørnøya and Terøya along with the mainland to the southeast.

In 2024, the population of the island was 316. Most of the population lives on the southeastern side of the island. The Nordøyvegen bridge and tunnel network was completed in 2022 and it connects the island of Lepsøya to the mainland via the Lepsøy Bridge.

The island was the location where the vessel Columbine ran aground after drifting across the North Sea with Betty Mouat on board. She was rescued by local fishermen and nursed back to health by the residents of the island before returning to Shetland via Edinburgh.

== See also ==
- List of islands of Norway
