= Anna Skeide =

Norwegian songwriter & poet (1910-1980)

- Born: 12 June 1910; Ørsta Municipality
- Died: 13 November 1980 (aged 70); Humla, Norway
- Known for: Songwriter, poet

Anna Skeide (née Paulsen; 12 June 1910 – 13 November 1980) was a Norwegian songwriter and poet who wrote in Nynorsk.

== Biography ==
Anna Paulsen's father was a cooper and fisherman Peder Paulsen and her mother was Ragnhild Brekke. The Paulsen family moved to Ålesund in 1925 after a bankruptcy. Here Anna took various jobs; her longest was at the dairy. She attended junior high school for a year and took a few short courses, but beyond that she had no education. At the age of 23, Anna Paulsen married teacher Theodor Skeide and took his last name. After a few years in Herøy municipality, the family moved in 1939 to Humla, an island in Borgundfjorden.

Anna Skeide was annoyed that she started writing poetry so late, but the main reason was probably the Second World War. She made her debut in 1957 with Ro bort din båt over vannet – all three of her first poetry collections had titles related to the sea. “I have always felt a pull towards the sea, even though I did not grow up by the sea, there was something strange about this arm of the fjord at my childhood home in Ørsta. The sea was never calm, there was always a pull of hidden forces that I could hardly grasp,” she has said. Her poems convey longings and natural moods with the help of direct images in an unpretentious form.

Dagbladet wrote about the first poetry collection: "Norway must welcome Anna Skeide with joy. It is not every day that such an authoritative and convincing debutant emerges".

Kathrin Papst, who lived in Anna's house for a period, wrote this:

"It is almost impossible to give a simple description of what kind of person Anna Skeide was. In a way, she was almost everything. She was very kind to others, but could also be angry and furious. She was funny, happy and joyful, but also sad and thoughtful. She was a person who wrote all her feelings. The poems reflect joy of life and compassion, anxiety and depressed thoughts. They are as diverse as her multifaceted personality."

Interest in Anna Skeide gained momentum in the 1970s after Danish critic Poul Borum characterized her as "a powerful lyrical talent, with authority and a secretiveness like few others."

Like other poets, Anna Skeide's goal was to reach people, to make them understand and share her thoughts. Just before Anna Skeide died in the fall of 1980, she had submitted the manuscript for a new collection of poems, the tenth from her hand. The final arrangements with the publisher had to be made by her daughter, Randi Skeide Gjessing. The collection was entitled The Hour Before Night . Anna Skeide was often used to write songs for various occasions and was often asked to write wedding songs. She wrote "Borgundsangen".

Anna Skeide died in Humla on 13 November 1980 .

== Bibliography ==
- Ro bort din båt, 1957
- Båredrag, 1959
- Sov stilt min sjø, 1961
- Treet og lyset, 1964
- Blå time, 1967
- Mellom natt og draum, 1969
- Tredje strengen, 1972
- Dansen går vidare, 1974
- Eld skriv med skuggar, 1977
- Dikt i utval (ved Ove Bakken), 1980
- Timen før natt, posthumt 1981

== Awards ==
- Sunnmørsprisen 1968 (together with Anna Sandnes)
- Ålesunds kulturpris 1968

== Sources ==
- «Anna Skeide – lyrikaren frå Strandgata i Ørsta» av Kåre Dag Madsen i Møre-Nytt (30. desember 2006).
- Anna Skeide, Store norske leksikon
- Øystein Rottem: Norges litteraturhistorie, bind 1: Fra Brekke til Mehren 1945–65. (Cappelen, Oslo, 1996) ISBN 9788202148270
