= Tørla =

Island in Møre og Romsdal, Norway

Tørla Hankøya
- Interactive map of Tørla; Hankøya

Geography
- Location: Møre og Romsdal, Norway
- Coordinates: 62.4355°N 6.3189°E
- Area: 1.5 km^{2} (0.58 sq mi)
- Length: 1.3 km (0.81 mi)
- Width: 2 km (1.2 mi)
- Coastline: 8 km (5 mi)
- Highest elevation: 41 m (135 ft)

Administration
- Norway
- County: Møre og Romsdal
- Municipality: Ålesund Municipality

Tørla is a small island in Ålesund Municipality in Møre og Romsdal county, Norway. It has bridge connections to the neighboring islands of Humla (to the west) and to Uksenøya (to the east). The island is located in the inner part of the Borgundfjorden, south of the village of Spjelkavik and just north of the island of Sula.

The island was part of the old Borgund Municipality from 1838 until 1968, when Borgund was merged into Ålesund Municipality. Grendahuset is a former school that is now a community hall that is situated in the middle part of the island. Most of the development is on the western part of the island, while the eastern part is mostly wooded.

== See also ==
- List of islands of Norway
