= Bjørnøya, Haram =

Island in Møre og Romsdal, Norway

Bjørnøya
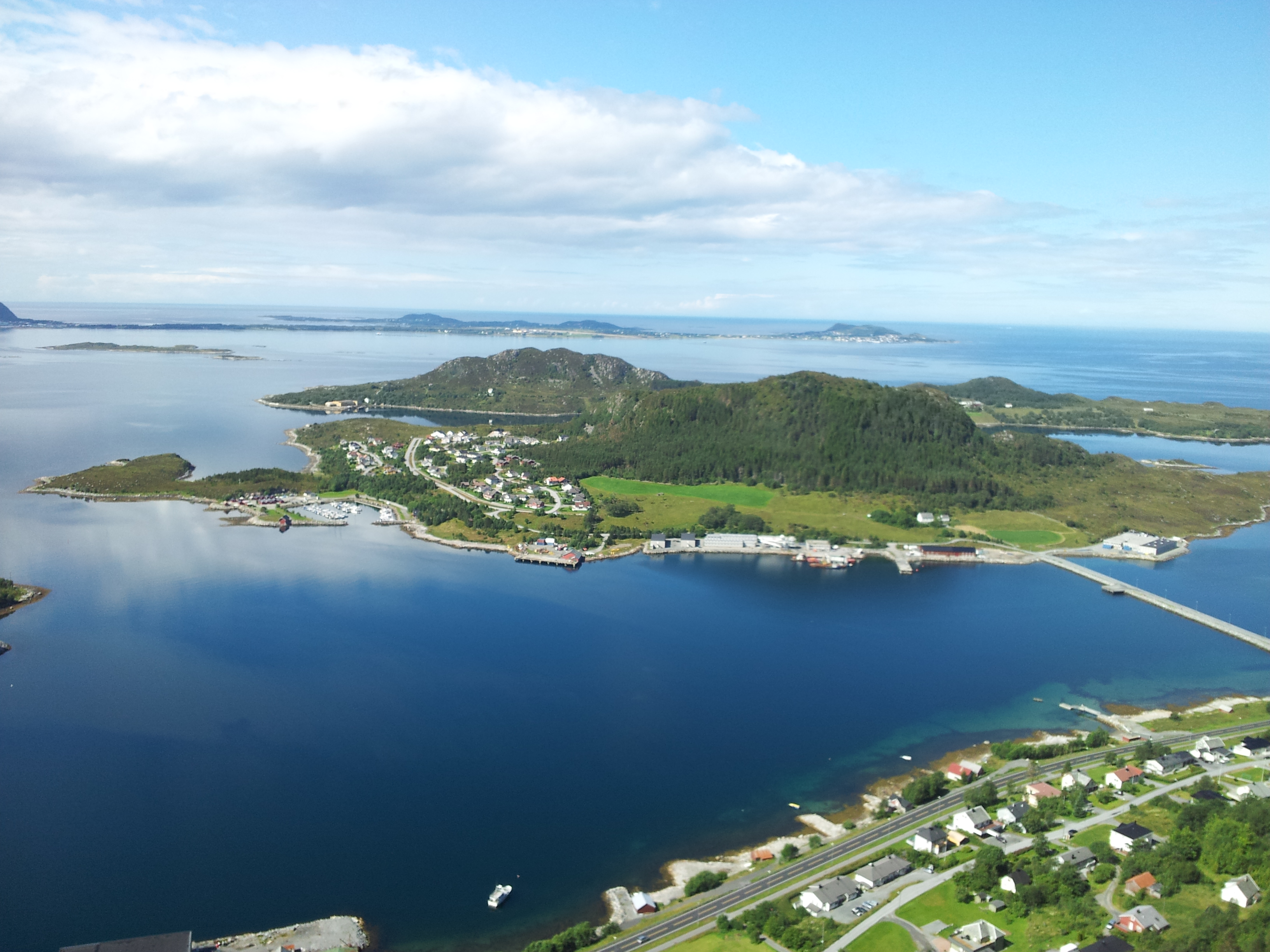
- Terøya island can be seen here, connected to the mainland by a small causeway. The island of Bjørnøya is immediately behind it, separated by a narrow 300-metre (980 ft) wide channel. The view of Bjørnøya is partly obscured by the mountain on Terøya.
- Interactive map of Bjørnøya

Geography
- Location: Møre og Romsdal, Norway
- Coordinates: 62.5638°N 6.2408°E
- Area: 1.8 km^{2} (0.69 sq mi)
- Length: 3 km (1.9 mi)
- Width: 600 m (2000 ft)
- Coastline: 10 km (6 mi)
- Highest elevation: 124 m (407 ft)
- Highest point: Bjørnøyfjella

Administration
- Norway
- County: Møre og Romsdal
- Municipality: Haram Municipality

Bjørnøya (lit. 'Bear Island') is a populated island in Haram Municipality in Møre og Romsdal county, Norway. It lies in the Vigrafjorden, between the island of Vigra to the west and the Norwegian mainland to the east. It is connected to the Norwegian mainland through a man-made causeway. The nearest larger village on the mainland is Søvik. To the east of the Bjørnøya (between Bjørnøya and Søvik) lies the island of Terøya. The two islands are separated by the Bjørnøysundet strait.

The island was part of the old Borgund Municipality until 1965 when it joined Haram Municipality. In 2020, it became part of Ålesund Municipality. Then in 2024, it became part of Haram Municipality once again.

There are several hamlets on the island, the notable ones among them are Bjørnøya and Fagerheim. The children on the island are served by the school in Søvik, just 6 kilometres (3.7 mi) to the southeast.

The highest point on Bjørnøya is the 124-metre (407 ft) tall Bjørnøyfjellet. A marked path leads up to the top. Another moderately-high peak on the central-north part of the island rises to elevation of 80 metres (260 ft). Other attractions on the island include the Bjørnøya coastal fort (Bjørnøya Kystfort) in the south. There are also beaches, forests, and wetlands (Tangane) in the northeast part of the island. The municipality of Haram had plans to develop two preserves on the island: one preserving shores and the other preserving the wetlands.
