= Håkon Lykkebø Strand =

Norwegian politician (born 1996)

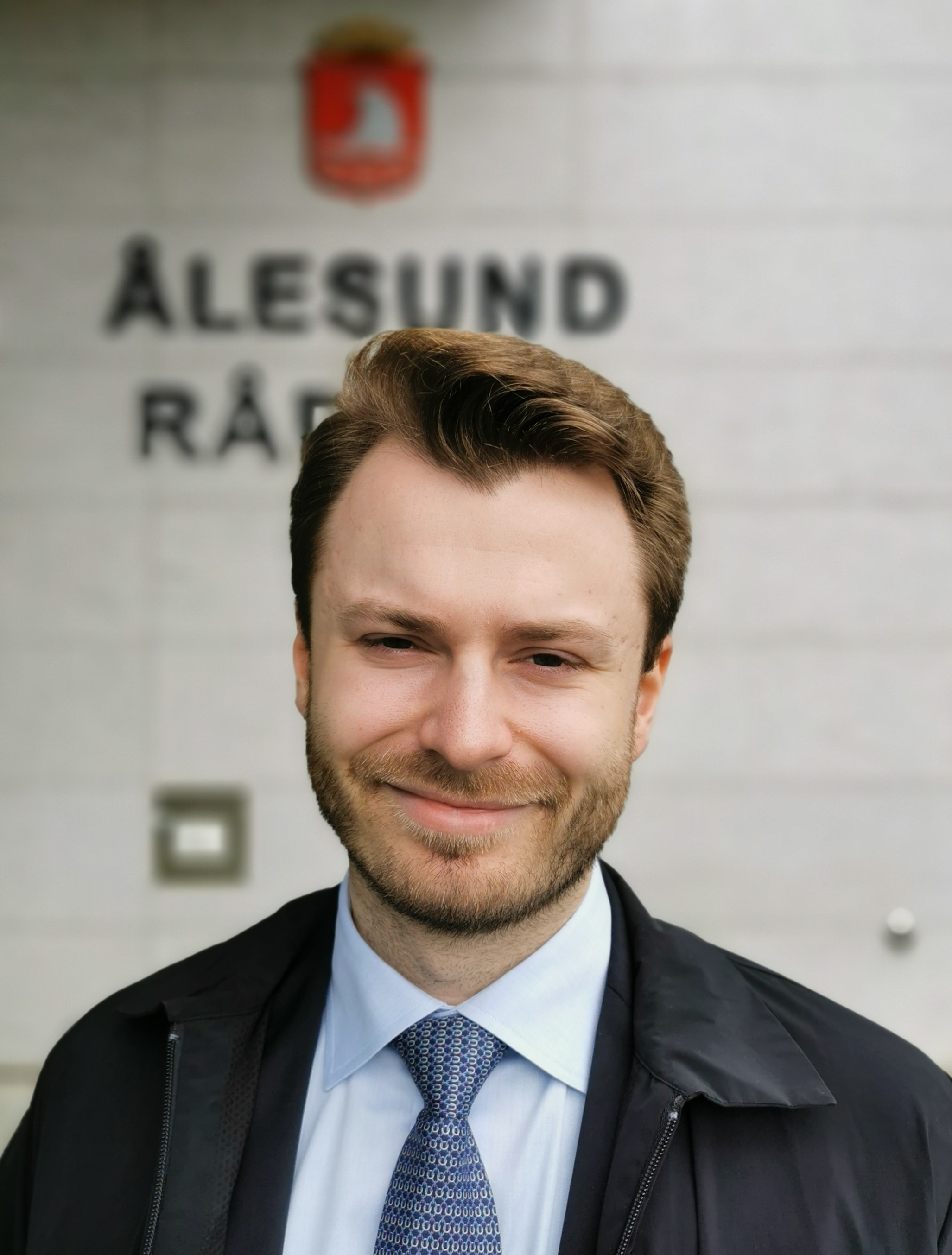

Mayor of Ålesund
- Incumbent
- Assumed office 17 September 2023
- Preceded by: Eva Vinje Aurdal

Personal details
- Born: 6 June 1996 (age 30)
- Party: Progress Party

Håkon Lykkebø Strand (born 6 June 1996) is a Norwegian politician serving as mayor of Ålesund since 2023. He has been a deputy member of the Storting since 2017.
