= Løvika =

Village in Ålesund Municipality, Norway

- Village
- Interactive map of Løvika
- Location within Møre og Romsdal Location within Norway
- Coordinates: 62°25′59″N 06°27′32″E
- Country: Norway
- Region: Western Norway
- County: Møre og Romsdal
- District: Sunnmøre
- Municipality: Ålesund Municipality
- Time zone: UTC+01:00 (CET)
  - Summer (DST): UTC+02:00 (CEST)
- Post Code: 6013 Ålesund

Løvika is a village in Ålesund Municipality in Møre og Romsdal county, Norway. Løvika has approximately 200 inhabitants and is mostly known for its farming industry. It is located on the south side of Uksenøya island, 8 kilometres (5.0 mi) southeast of the village of Spjelkavik and 10 kilometres (6.2 mi) northwest of the village of Aure, which is located across the Storfjorden in Sykkylven Municipality.
