= Spjelkavik Church =

- Spjelkavik kyrkje
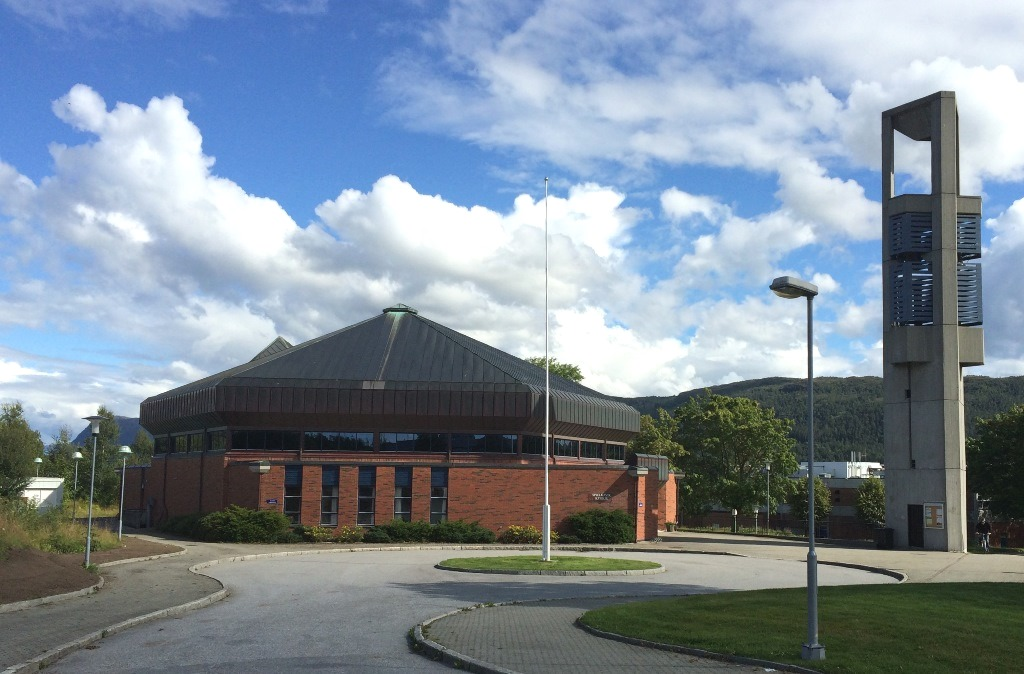
- View of the church
- Spjelkavik Church
- 62°28′04″N 6°20′52″E
- Location: Ålesund Municipality, Møre og Romsdal
- Country: Norway
- Denomination: Church of Norway
- Churchmanship: Evangelical Lutheran

History
- Status: Parish church
- Founded: 1987
- Consecrated: 1987

Architecture
- Functional status: Active
- Architect: Alf Apalseth
- Architectural type: Hexagonal
- Completed: 1987 (39 years ago)

Specifications
- Capacity: 500
- Materials: Brick

Administration
- Diocese: Møre bispedømme
- Deanery: Nordre Sunnmøre prosti
- Parish: Spjelkavik
- Norwegian Cultural Heritage Site
- Type: Church
- Status: Not protected
- ID: 227365

Spjelkavik Church (Norwegian: Spjelkavik kyrkje) is a parish church of the Church of Norway in Ålesund Municipality in Møre og Romsdal county, Norway. It is located in the borough of Spjelkavik on the western end of the island of Uksenøya. It is the church for the Spjelkavik parish which is part of the Nordre Sunnmøre prosti (deanery) in the Diocese of Møre. The brick church was built in a hexagonal design in 1987 using plans drawn up by the architect Alf Apalseth. The church seats about 500 people.

== See also ==
- List of churches in Møre
