= Ivar Flem =

Norwegian newspaper editor

- Born: 8 January 1865; Haram Municipality, Norway
- Died: 1948 (aged 82–83)
- Occupation: Newspaper editor
- Known for: Chief editor of Sunnmørsposten 1894–1946 (except during WW2)
- Children: Dagfinn Flem (1906–1976); Magne Flem (1908–1995)

Ivar Elias Kornelius Flem (8 January 1865 – 1948) was a Norwegian newspaper editor. He was chief editor of the newspaper Sunnmørsposten for nearly fifty years.

== Personal life ==
Flem was born on 8 January 1865 in Haram Municipality to Martinius Ingebrigtsen Flem and Oline Blindheim. In 1897 He married Nikoline Susanna Landmark. He was the father of Dagfinn Flem and Magne Flem.

Flem died in 1948.

== Career ==
Flem passed examen artium in 1885, and studied philology. In 1894 he became editor of the Ålesund based newspaper Sunnmørsposten. In 1896 he bought the newspaper and was both publisher and editor the next fifty years, except during the German occupation of Norway, when he was dismissed from his position as editor by the Nazi authorities. Sunnmørsposten became a daily newspaper from 1905, and was eventually regarded among the most important newspapers in the region. In 1946 his two sons Dagfinn and Magne took over as editors, and the newspaper was owned by the family until 1991.

Flem supported the Liberal Party. He was an eager advocate for the dissolution of the union between Norway and Sweden. He also supported the eight-hour day for employees, which he implemented in Sunnmørsposten, along with paid vacation. He was a member of the municipal council of Ålesund Municipality from 1914 to 1922. He also wrote two books, Mennesket naturbestemt and Determinismen.
