= Søvik, Haram =

Søvik Søvika
- Village
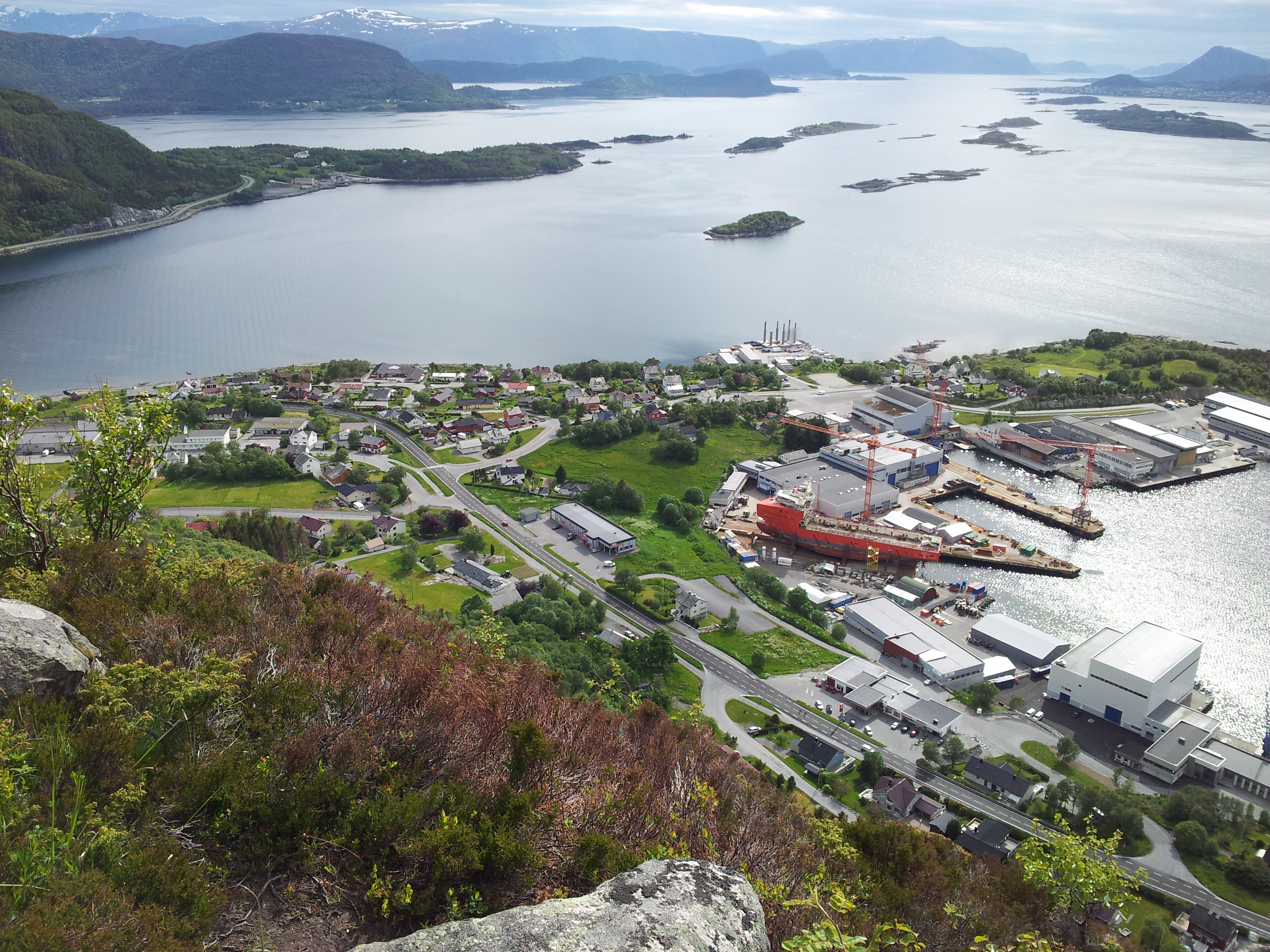
- View of the village
- Interactive map of Søvik
- Location within Møre og Romsdal Location within Norway
- Coordinates: 62.5474°N 6.2790°E
- Country: Norway
- Region: Western Norway
- County: Møre og Romsdal
- District: Sunnmøre
- Municipality: Haram Municipality

Area
  - Total: 0.84 km^{2} (0.32 sq mi)
- Elevation: 20 m (66 ft)

Population (2024)
  - Total: 1,003
  - Density: 1,194/km^{2} (3,090/sq mi)
- Time zone: UTC+01:00 (CET)
  - Summer (DST): UTC+02:00 (CEST)
- Post Code: 6280 Søvik

Søvik is a village and a regional service center in Haram Municipality in Møre og Romsdal county, Norway. It is located in the mainland part of Haram Municipality, along the sea, just southeast of the islands of Bjørnøya and Terøya.

The 0.84-square-kilometre (210-acre) village has a population (2024) of 1,003 and a population density of 1,194 inhabitants per square kilometre (3,090/sq mi). The main church for Søvik is Hamnsund Church, located just outside the nearby village in Hamnsund.

Søvik is a service center for the population in the nearby smaller villages of Hamnsund and Gamlem, as well as the islands of Bjørnøya and Terøya. These services include the Søvik skule. The main industries of Søvik are fishing, shipyards, and the provision of public and commercial services. Local companies are the STX Norway Offshore AS, Mørenot, Coop, Spar, and Mix.

The village area was part of the old Borgund Municipality until 1965 when it joined Haram Municipality. In 2020, it became part of Ålesund Municipality. Then in 2024, it became part of Haram Municipality once again.
