= Dagfinn Flem =

Norwegian newspaper editor and politician

- Born: 28 July 1906; Borgund Municipality
- Died: 28 May 1976 (aged 69); Ålesund
- Occupations: Newspaper editor and politician
- Father: Ivar Flem
- Relatives: Magne Flem (brother)
- Awards: Order of St. Olav (1966)

Dagfinn Flem (28 July 1906 – 28 May 1976) was a Norwegian politician, newspaper editor, non-fiction writer and translator. He was born in Borgund Municipality, a son of Ivar Flem and Nikoline Landmark, and a brother of Magne Flem. He edited the newspaper Sunnmørsposten from 1946, along with his brother. He was mayor of Ålesund Municipality for the Liberal Party from 1958 to 1965.

He was decorated Knight, First Class of the Order of St. Olav in 1966.
