= Terøya =

Terøya may refer to the following places in Norway:

- Terøya, Haram, an island in Haram Municipality in Møre og Romsdal county
- Terøya, Vestland, an islet in Kvinnherad Municipality in Vestland county
- Lille Terøya, an islet in Øksnes Municipality in Nordland county
- Store Terøya, an islet in Øksnes Municipality in Nordland county
