= Borgund Church =

Church in Møre og Romsdal, Norway

- Borgund kyrkje
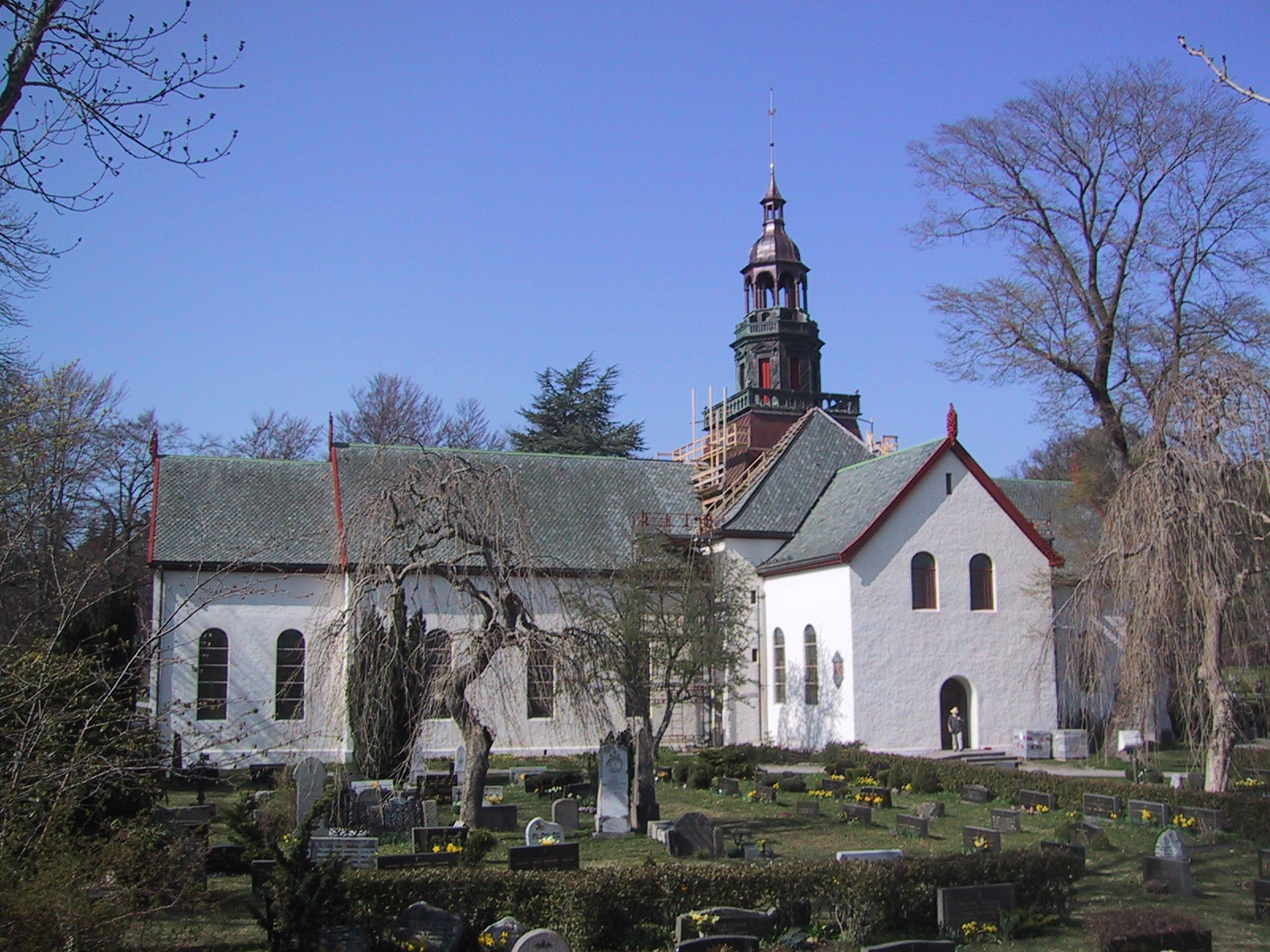
- View of the church
- Borgund Church
- 62°27′59″N 6°14′02″E
- Location: Ålesund Municipality, Møre og Romsdal
- Country: Norway
- Denomination: Church of Norway
- Previous denomination: Catholic Church
- Churchmanship: Evangelical Lutheran

History
- Status: Parish church
- Founded: 12th century
- Consecrated: 7 August 1907
- Events: 1904: fire

Architecture
- Functional status: Active
- Architectural type: Cruciform
- Style: Romanesque and Gothic
- Completed: c. 1150 (876 years ago)

Specifications
- Capacity: 750
- Materials: Stone

Administration
- Diocese: Møre bispedømme
- Deanery: Nordre Sunnmøre prosti
- Parish: Borgund
- Norwegian Cultural Heritage Site
- Type: Church
- Status: Automatically protected
- ID: 83932

Borgund Church (Norwegian: Borgund kyrkje) is a parish church of the Church of Norway in Ålesund Municipality in Møre og Romsdal county, Norway. It is located in the village of Borgund, just east of the city of Ålesund. It is the church for the Borgund parish which is part of the Nordre Sunnmøre prosti (deanery) in the Diocese of Møre. The historic, white, stone church was built in a cruciform design around the year 1300 using plans drawn up by an unknown architect. The church reflects both Romanesque and Gothic architectural styles. The church seats about 750 people.

Throughout history, the church was the seat of the large Borgund prestegjeld and later it was the main church for the large Borgund Municipality.

== History ==
The earliest existing historical records of a church in Borgund date back to the 12th century. In fact, at one point, there may have been as many as four stone churches in Borgund. Records talk about the Margaretakyrkja (St. Margaret's Church), Kristkyrkja (Christ Church), Matteuskyrkja (St. Matthew's Church), and Peterskyrkja (St. Peter's Church). St. Margaret's Church likely closed in the 1300s, the Christ Church closed in the early 1400s, and the St. Matthew's Church closed in 1432. The present-day Borgund Church is located on the same site as the 12th century St. Peter's Church, in fact some of the current stone walls are the original walls. The earliest existing historical records of the church date back to the year 1309, and a reference to the priest in St. Peter's Church is referenced in the year 1290. The stone church was likely built in the early 12th century. The original church had a rectangular nave that measured about 12.9 by 8.9 metres (42 ft × 29 ft) and a choir that measured 6.5 by 5.8 metres (21 ft × 19 ft).

In 1632-1633, the church was expanded. The northern wall of the nave was opened up and a new wing was built to the north to add more seating. This gave the church a partial cruciform design. An inscription in the church states that the stone used to build the new transept (wing) was taken from the ruins of the old St. Margaret's Church that was located nearby. The altarpiece and pulpit were decorated in the baroque style during this time as well.

In 1814, this church served as an election church (Norwegian: valgkirke). Together with more than 300 other parish churches across Norway, it was a polling station for elections to the 1814 Norwegian Constituent Assembly which wrote the Constitution of Norway. This was Norway's first national elections. Each church parish was a constituency that elected people called "electors" who later met together in each county to elect the representatives for the assembly that was to meet at Eidsvoll Manor later that year.

In 1864 the church was significantly expanded again by opening up the south wall of the nave and adding a new wing to the south, creating a true cruciform design. A new choir was built at the south end of the new wing, and the benches throughout the church were re-aligned with the new configuration of the building since the original choir was in the east wing of the building. In 1899, a new sacristy was built on the south end of the choir.

The church had a major fire and much of the building was almost completely destroyed on 13 April 1904 by an arsonist only described as "mentally disturbed" by the local police. The loss was tragic, but a new church was rapidly built within the remaining medieval walls that withstood the fire. The architects Christian Fürst and Hans Backer Fürst (who were brothers) were hired to lead the rebuilding effort. The church was consecrated on 7 August 1907. The pulpit and altar were carved from oak by local craftsmen. Additional wooden features were later added by artist Oddvin Parr. The church organ dates from 1981 to was built by Marcussen & Søn of Aabenraa, Denmark.

== Media gallery ==
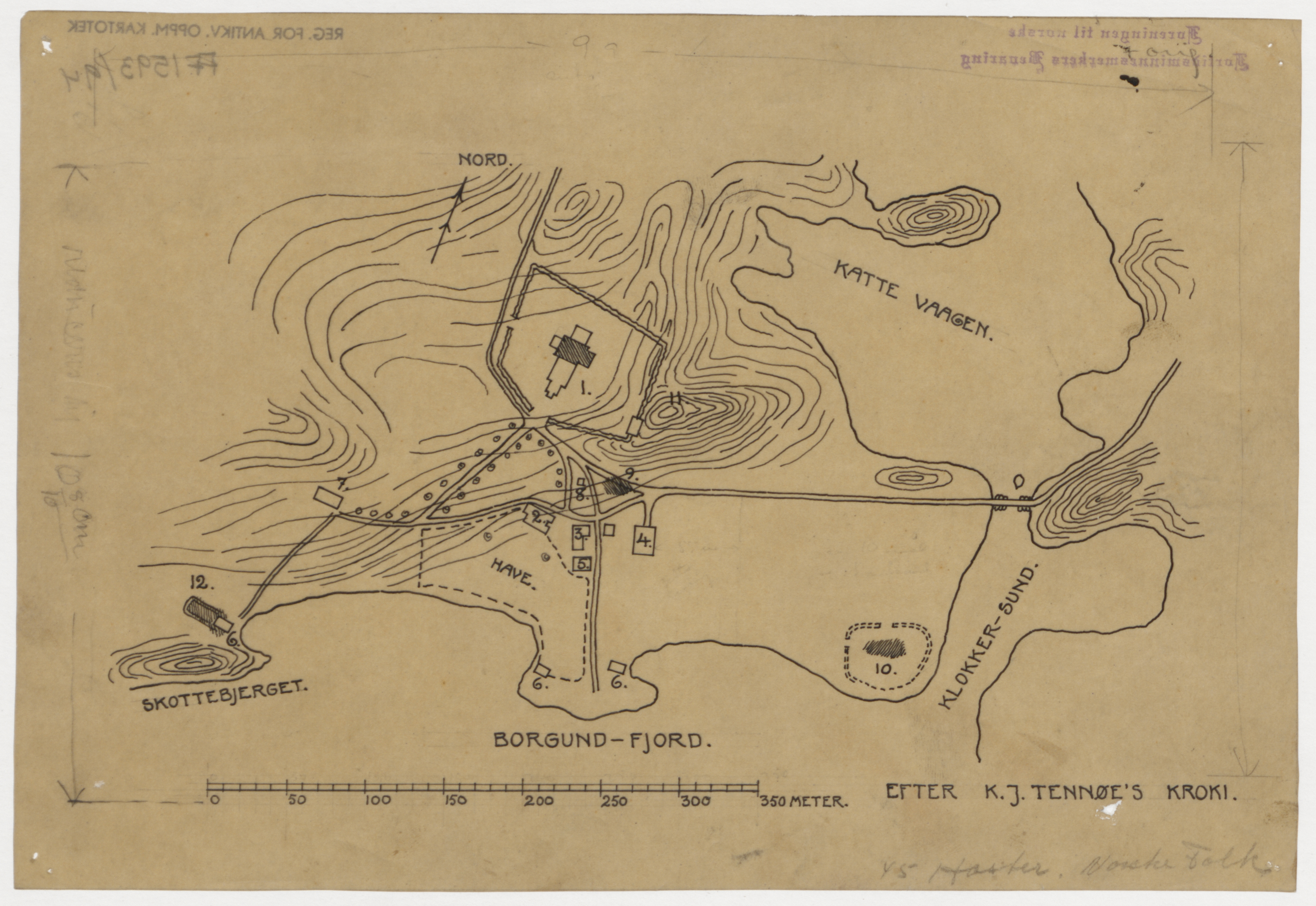
Drawing of the church site (original building in black with additions shown)

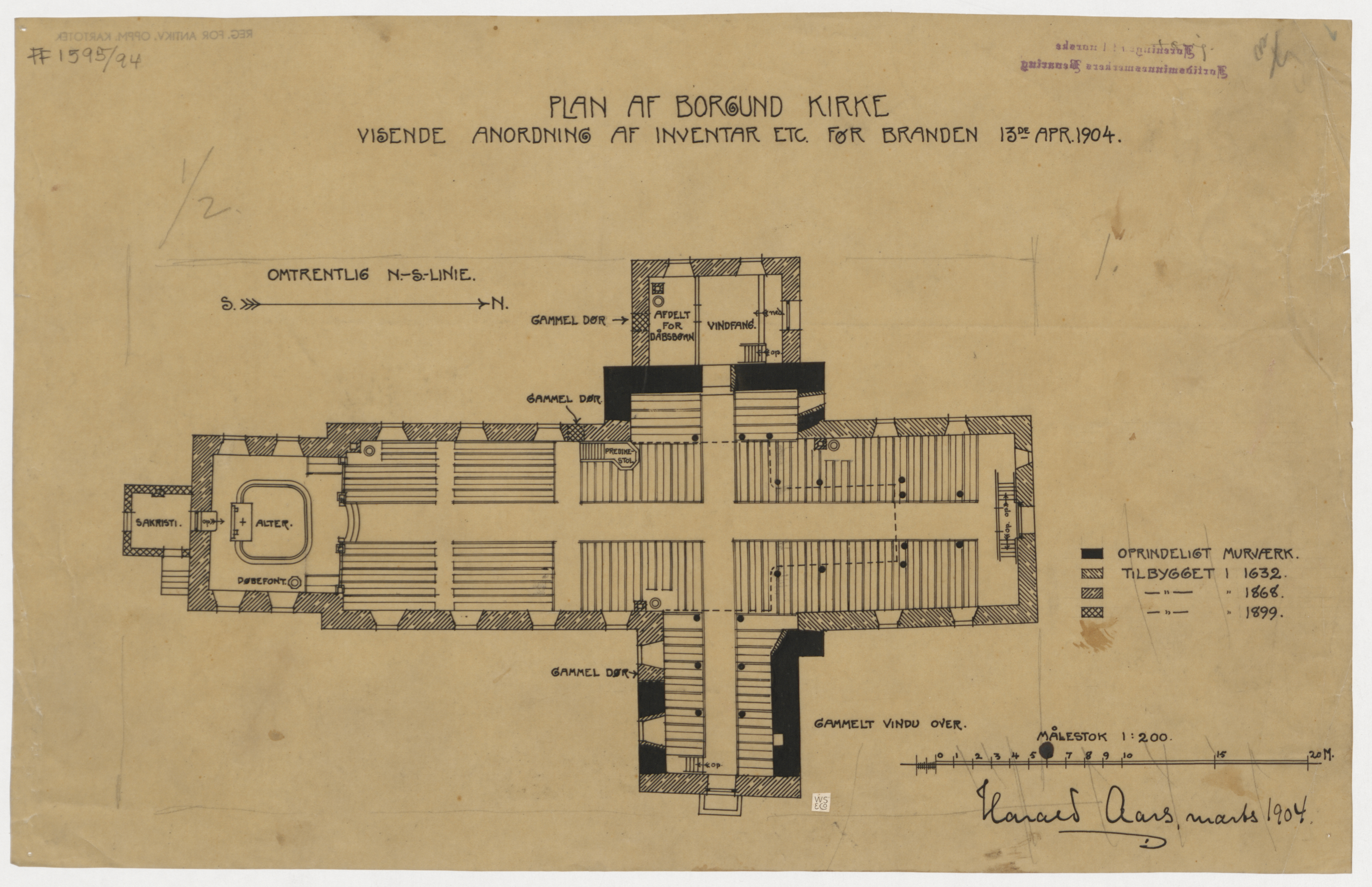
Floorplan of the church (dark walls are original with additions shown)

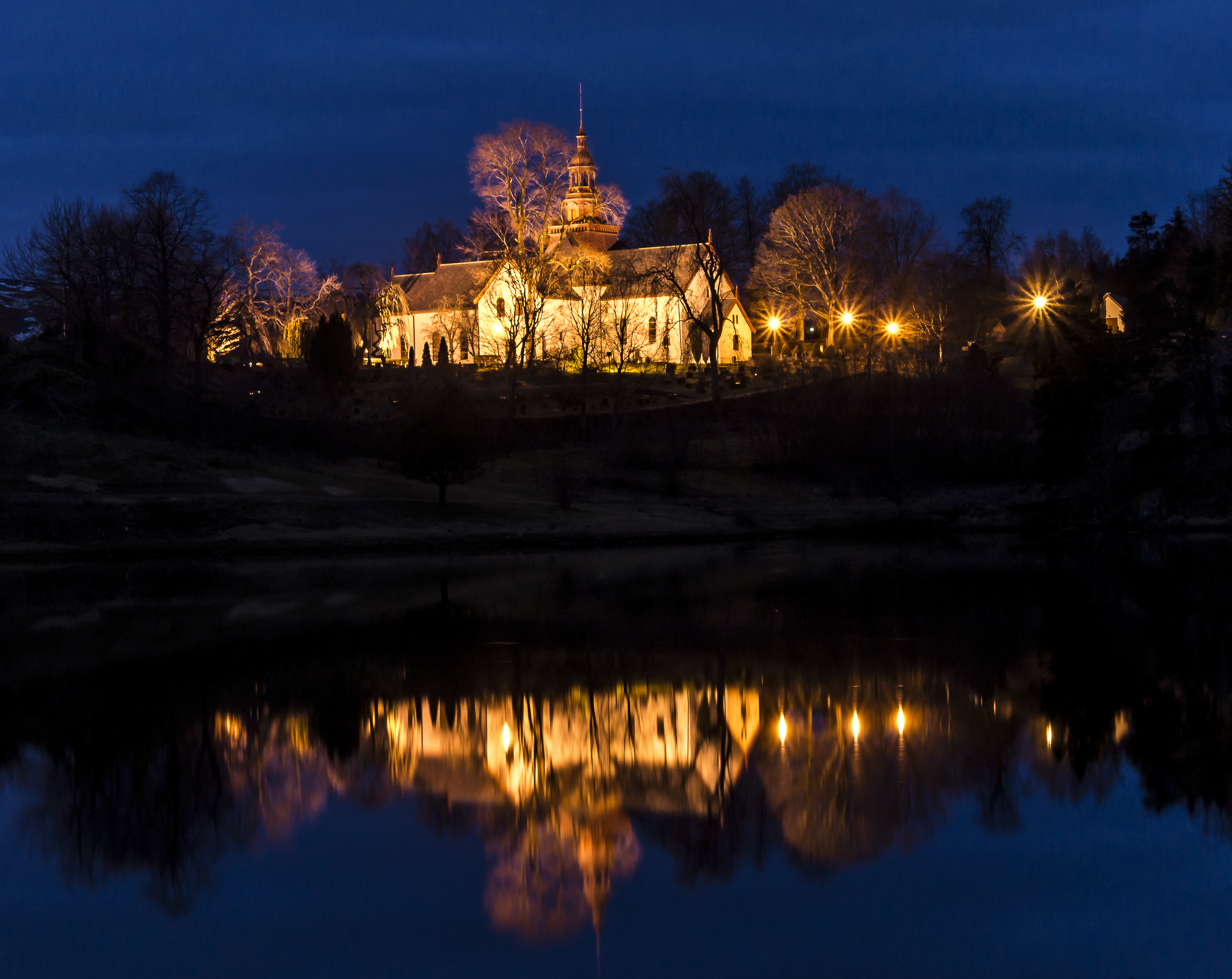
Exterior at night

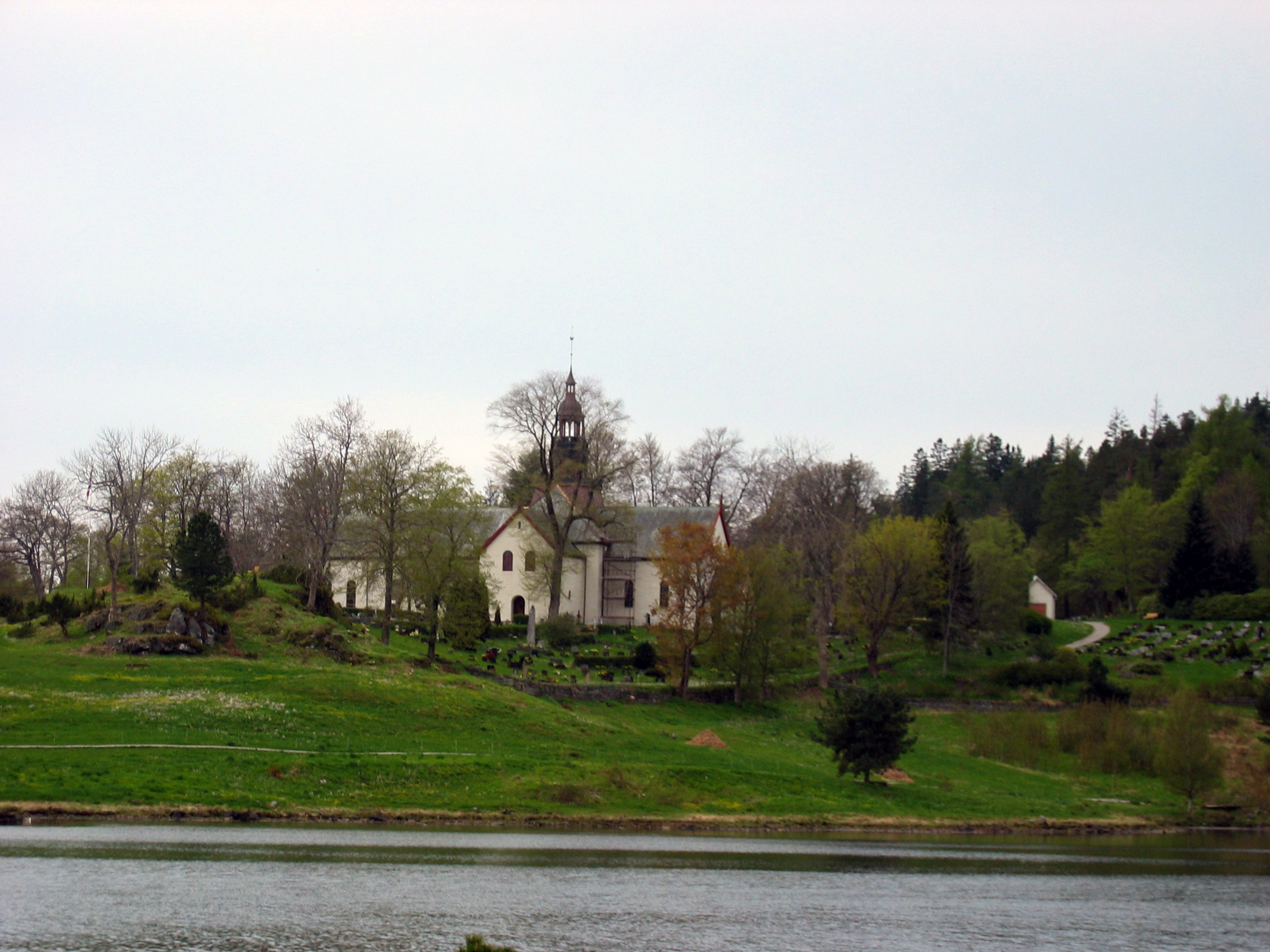
Exterior in daylight

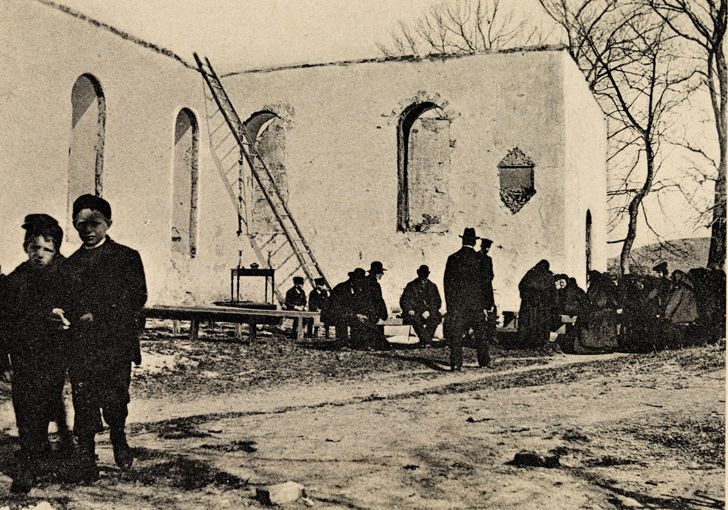
Ruins after the 1904 fire

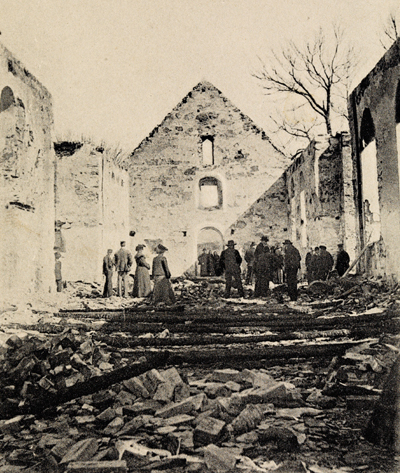
Ruins after the 1904 fire

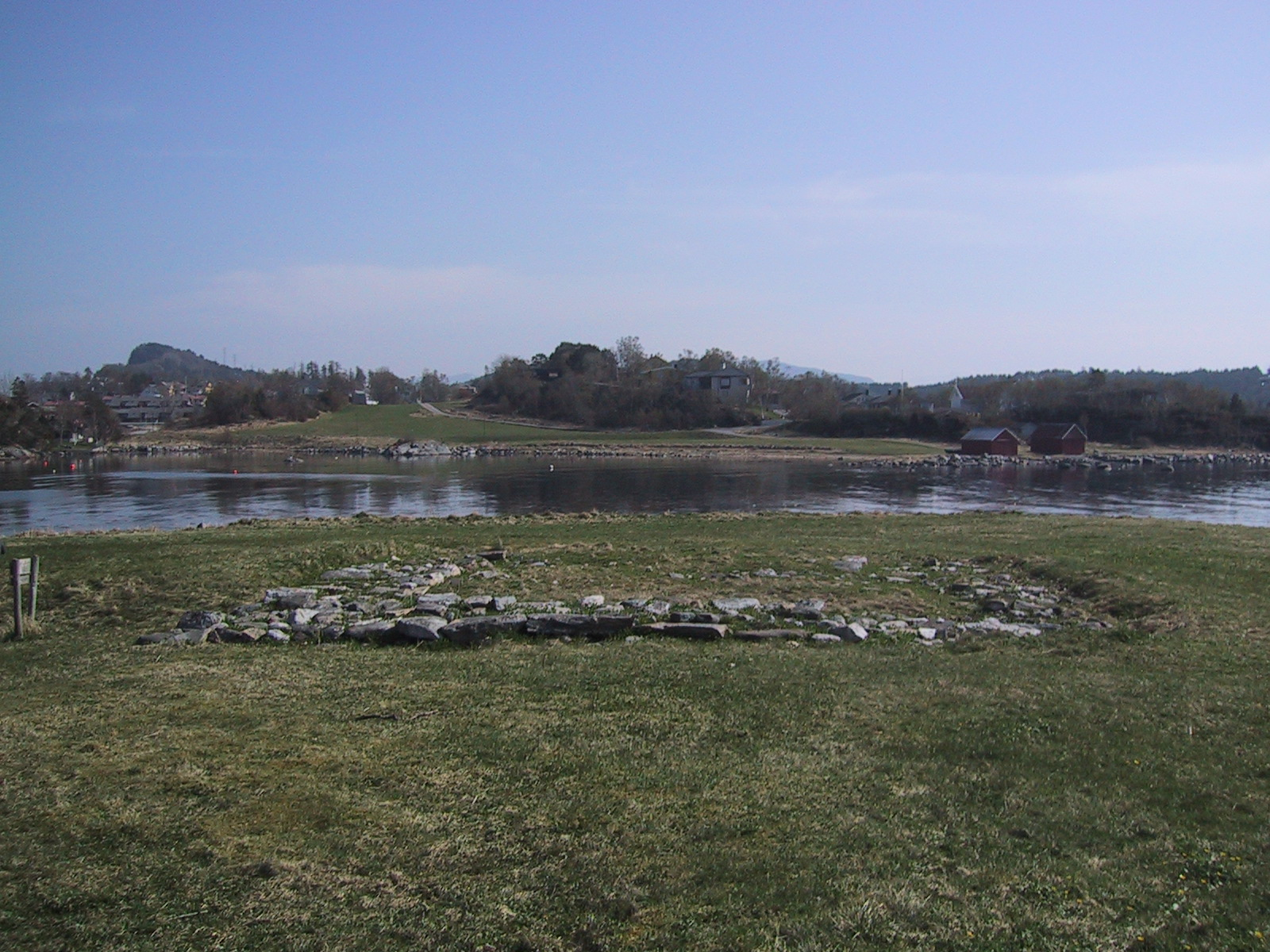
Ruins of the nearby St. Margaret's Church in Borgund

== See also ==
- List of churches in Møre
