= Skarbøvik Church =

Church in Møre og Romsdal, Norway

- Skarbøvik kyrkje
- Skarbøvik Church
- 62°27′57″N 6°06′38″E
- Location: Ålesund Municipality, Møre og Romsdal
- Country: Norway
- Denomination: Church of Norway
- Churchmanship: Evangelical Lutheran

History
- Status: Chapel
- Founded: 1995
- Consecrated: 1995

Architecture
- Functional status: Active
- Architect: Oskar Norderval
- Architectural type: Long church
- Completed: 1995 (31 years ago)

Specifications
- Capacity: 150
- Materials: Brick

Administration
- Diocese: Møre bispedømme
- Deanery: Nordre Sunnmøre prosti
- Parish: Ålesund

Skarbøvik Church (Norwegian: Skarbøvik kyrkje) is a chapel of the Church of Norway in Ålesund Municipality in Møre og Romsdal county, Norway. It is located in the village of Skarbøvik on the island of Heissa. It is an annex chapel for the Ålesund parish which is part of the Nordre Sunnmøre prosti (deanery) in the Diocese of Møre. The brick church was built in a long church design in 1995 using plans drawn up by the architect Oskar Norderval. The church seats about 150 people. The church is a privately-run chapel that is overseen by a foundation rather than by the parish.

== See also ==
- List of churches in Møre
