= Peder Tonning =

Norwegian politician (1782–1839)

Peder Tonning (14 January 1782 – 3 May 1839) was a Norwegian politician.

He was the son of the wealthy merchant Ole Tonning in Stryn, but moved to Aalesund. When local government was introduced in Norway in 1837 (the formannskapsdistrikt law), Tonning became the first mayor of Aalesund.

He was elected to the Norwegian Parliament in 1814 and 1830, representing the constituency of Romsdals Amt. He was also a deputy representative in 1821. He worked as postmaster.
