= Humla, Norway =

Island in Møre og Romsdal, Norway

Humla
- Interactive map of Humla

Geography
- Location: Møre og Romsdal, Norway
- Coordinates: 62.4458°N 6.2910°E
- Area: 0.9 km^{2} (0.35 sq mi)
- Length: 2 km (1.2 mi)
- Width: 850 m (2790 ft)
- Coastline: 6 km (3.7 mi)

Administration
- Norway
- County: Møre og Romsdal
- Municipality: Ålesund Municipality

Humla is a small island in Ålesund Municipality in Møre og Romsdal county, Norway. It is located in the Borgundfjorden south and west of the island of Uksenøya, north of the island of Sula, and northwest of the small island of Tørla. There is a bridge from Humla to Tørla, and Tørla has a bridge to Uksenøya.

The island was part of the old Borgund Municipality from 1838 until 1968 when it was merged into Ålesund Municipality. The 0.9-square-kilometre island has a population (2010) of 160.

== See also ==
- List of islands of Norway
