= Hessa =

Island in Møre og Romsdal, Norway

- Interactive map of Hessa

Geography
- Location: Møre og Romsdal, Norway
- Coordinates: 62.4591°N 6.1183°E
- Area: 4 km^{2} (1.5 sq mi)
- Length: 4 km (2.5 mi)
- Width: 2 km (1.2 mi)
- Coastline: 14 km (8.7 mi)
- Highest elevation: 314 m (1030 ft)
- Highest point: Sukkertoppen

Administration
- Norway
- County: Møre og Romsdal
- Municipality: Ålesund Municipality

Demographics
- Population: 4040 (2015)

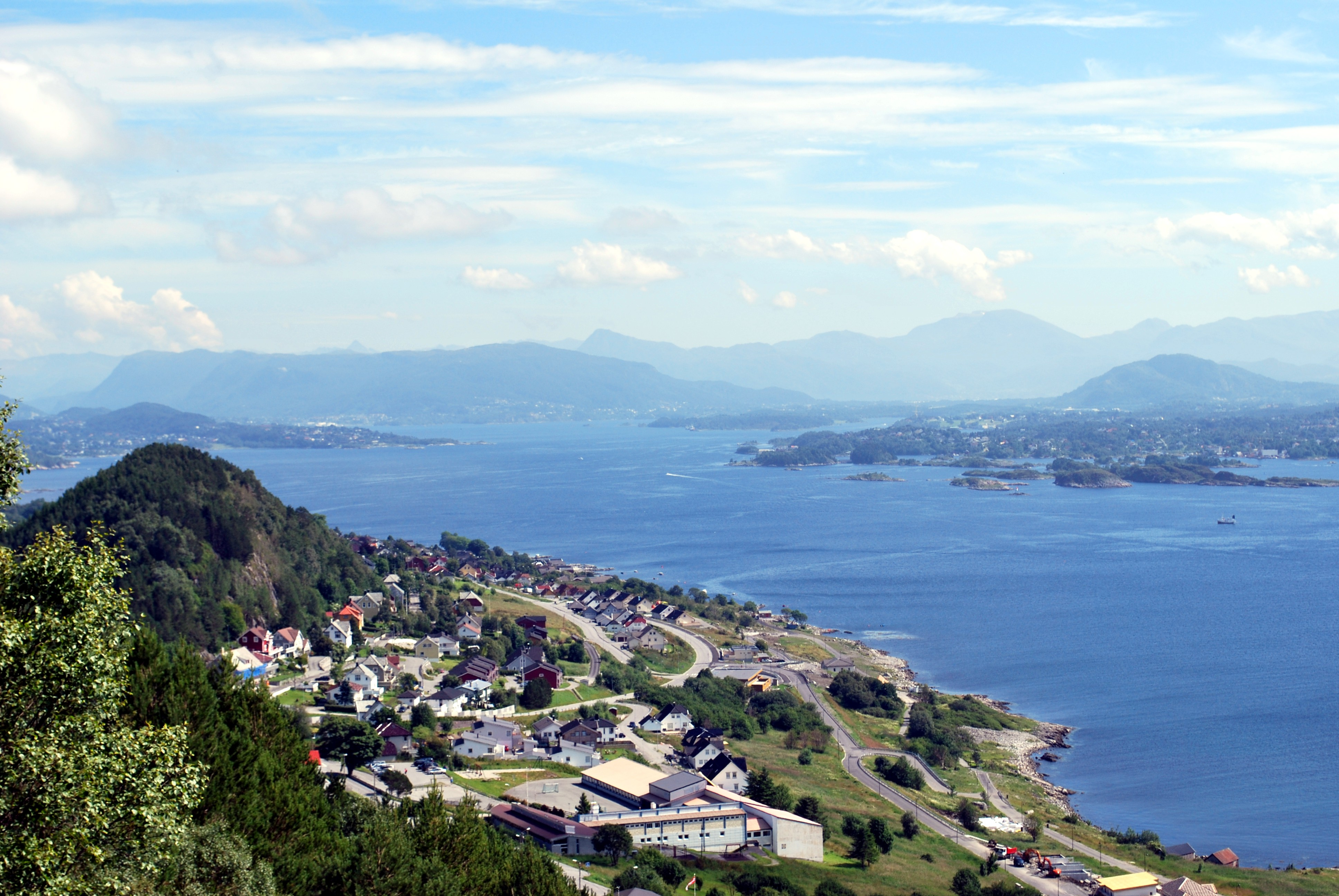
Ålesund, Norway. Hessa with Slinningen in foreground.

Hessa is an island in Ålesund Municipality in Møre og Romsdal county, Norway. It is the westernmost of the main islands making up the city of Ålesund. The island is located west and south of the island of Aspøya, south of Giske and Valderøya, east of Godøya, and north of the island of Sula. The 314-metre (1,030 ft) tall mountain Sukkertoppen is situated in the middle of the island.

The island contains mostly residential neighborhoods concentrated around the urban areas of Sævollen, Slinningen, and Skarbøvik. The island has an elementary school and a lower secondary school. Skarbøvik Church is the main church for the island's residents. The Atlantic Sea-Park is situated on Hessa.

== See also ==
- List of islands of Norway
