= Terøya, Haram =

Island in Møre og Romsdal, Norway

Terøya Terøy
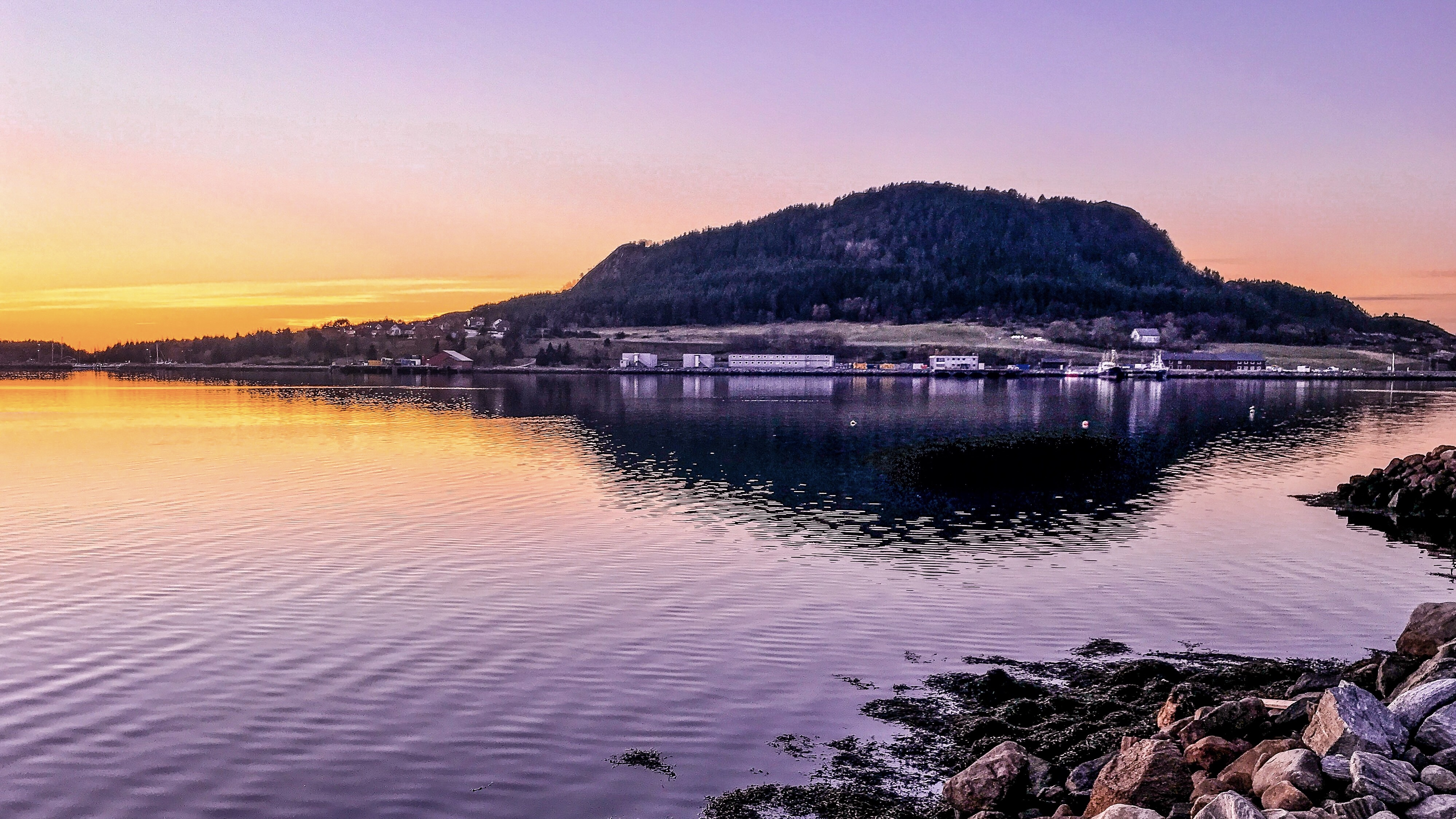
- View from Søvik in autumn 2018
- Interactive map of Terøya; Terøy

Geography
- Location: Møre og Romsdal, Norway
- Coordinates: 62.5537°N 6.2536°E
- Area: 1 km^{2} (0.39 sq mi)
- Length: 1.8 km (1.12 mi)
- Width: 1.1 km (0.68 mi)
- Coastline: 5.6 km (3.48 mi)
- Highest elevation: 148 m (486 ft)
- Highest point: Terøyfjellet

Administration
- Norway
- County: Møre og Romsdal
- Municipality: Haram Municipality

Terøya is a small, populated island in Haram Municipality in Møre og Romsdal county, Norway. The population of Terøya (about 200-300 people) is concentrated on the southern and eastern parts of the island. Terøya is connected to the village of Søvik on the mainland by a causeway on the east side. The island of Bjørnøya lies to the west of the island. The two islands are separated by the 300-metre (980 ft) wide Bjørnøysundet strait.

Terøya is located 3 kilometres (1.9 mi) from the village of Søvik where the Norwegian shipbuilding company Aker Yards is located (since 2008 that company is a part of STX Norway Offshore AS/STX Europe).

The island was part of the old Borgund Municipality until 1965 when it joined Haram Municipality. In 2020, it became part of Ålesund Municipality. Then in 2024, it became part of Haram Municipality once again.
