= Spjelkavik =

Village in Ålesund Municipality, Norway

- Borough of Ålesund
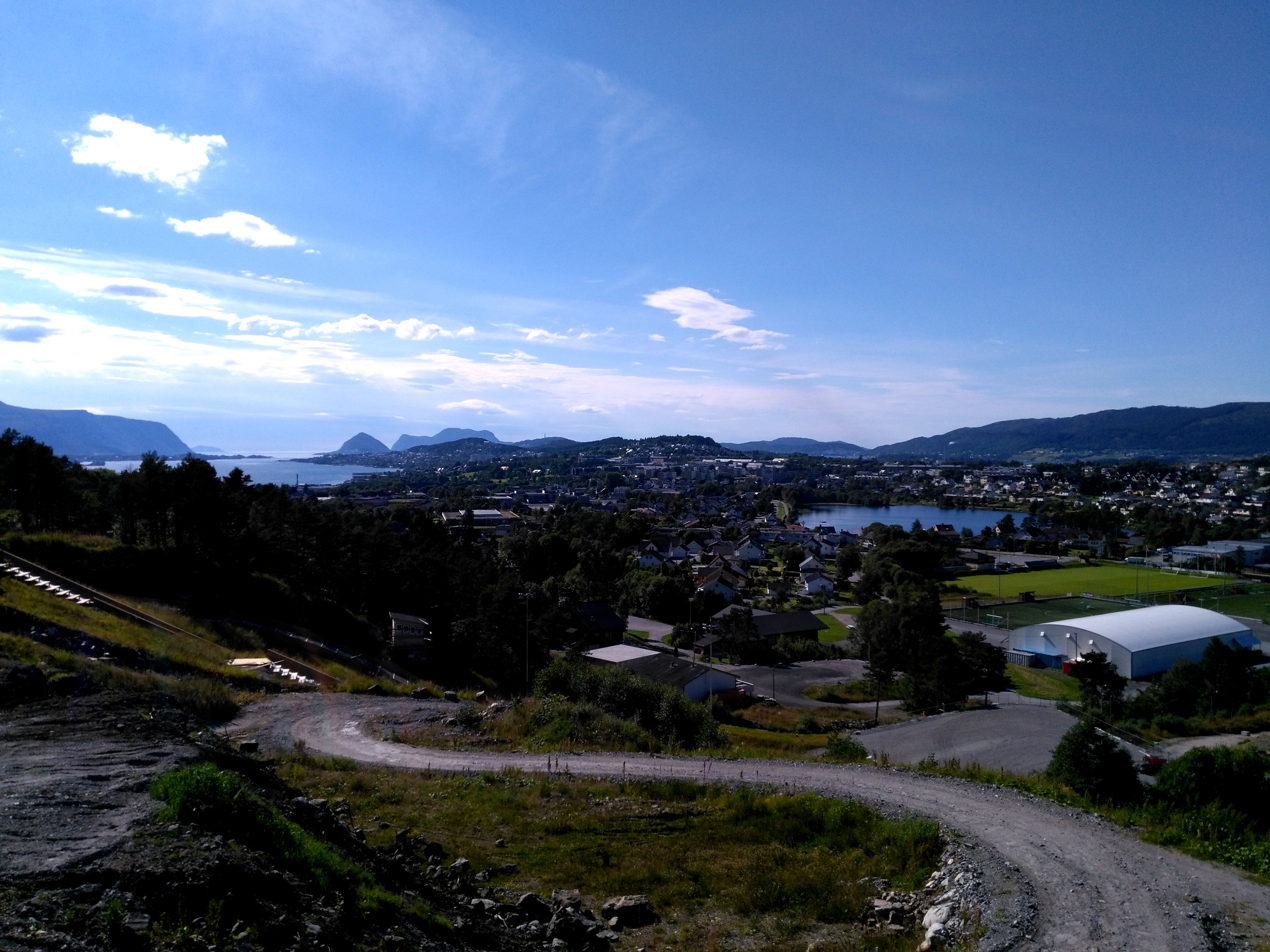
- Interactive map of Spjelkavik
- Location within Møre og Romsdal Location within Norway
- Coordinates: 62.4603°N 6.3620°E
- Country: Norway
- Region: Western Norway
- County: Møre og Romsdal
- District: Sunnmøre
- Municipality: Ålesund Municipality
- Elevation: 21 m (69 ft)
- Time zone: UTC+01:00 (CET)
  - Summer (DST): UTC+02:00 (CEST)
- Post Code: 6011 Ålesund

Spjelkavik is a borough in the town of Ålesund in Ålesund Municipality, Møre og Romsdal county, Norway. It is also called "Vika" by many locals. Spjelkavik is located on the western end of the island of Uksenøya, at the intersection of the European route E39 and European route E136 highways, just west of the lake Brusdalsvatnet. The villages of Breivika, Myrland, and Løvika lie to the south of Spjelkavik. The population of Spjelkavik is approximately 11,000 inhabitants and is the second largest part of the city. It is also one of areas that grows the quickest in Ålesund. The distance from the city center of Ålesund to Spjelkavik is about 10 kilometres (6.2 mi).

Spjelkavik has one of Norway's biggest malls (in the area called Moa) and the Spjelkavik branch of the Ålesund public library. Moa was once considered as a potential place for the city's airport, but final plans were made and the airport was built on the nearby island of Vigra instead. Today this area is booming due to not only shopping, but also a central point for logistic connections. Spjelkavik Church is located here.
