= Magne Flem =

Norwegian journalist and newspaper editor

- Born: 3 February 1908; Ålesund, Norway
- Died: 30 November 1995 (aged 87)
- Occupations: journalist and newspaper editor
- Known for: long-term editor of Sunnmørsposten
- Father: Ivar Flem
- Relatives: Dagfinn Flem (brother)

Magne Flem (3 February 1908 – 30 November 1995) was a Norwegian journalist and newspaper editor. He was born in Ålesund, and was a brother of Dagfinn Flem. He edited the newspaper Sunnmørsposten from 1946 to 1983, the first period together with his brother. During the German occupation of Norway he was a member of the clandestine intelligence organization XU.
