= Johannes Aarflot =

Norwegian politician and businessman (1824-1891)

- Born: Johannes Amundsson Aarflot; October 29, 1824; Ørsta, Møre og Romsdal, Norway
- Died: November 3, 1891 (aged 67)
- Occupations: Businessman, politician
- Years active: 1891-91
- Mother: Berte Canutte Aarflot

Johannes Amundsson Aarflot (29 October 1824 – 3 November 1891) was a Norwegian businessman and member of the Norwegian Parliament.

Aarflot was born on the Årflot farm near Ørsta (Aarflot i Ørsta) in what is now Ørsta Municipality in Møre og Romsdal county, Norway. He was the son of Amund Knutsson Aarflot (1788–1860) and his wife, Berte Canutte Aarflot (1795–1859) who was a Christian hymnwriter in the Haugean tradition (haugianere). From 1841 he was an employee at a bookstore in Aalesund. In 1860, he opened his own bookstore, Aarflots Bokhandel (now Ark Aarflot).

He was a member of the municipal council in Aalesund Municipality during 1861. He served as the mayor of the town in 1864, 1876–81 and 1883–91. He also served as one of the Settlement Commissioners (Forlikskommissær) on the District Conciliation Board (Forliksråd ) from 1870. Aarflot became a member of the Norwegian Parliament from the Conservative Party, representing "Aalesund og Molde" during four terms (1868-1869, 1871–1873, 1880–82, 1889–1891).

== Other sources ==
- Grytten, Ola H. (2010). Andresen, Nils A. (ed.). "Protestantisk etikk og entreprenørskapets ånd" [The Protestant Ethic and the Spirit of Entrepreneurship]. Minerva (in Norwegian). 86 (4). Oslo: Conservative Students' Association: 72. ISSN 0805-7842. OCLC 477895639.
