= Brusdalsvatnet =

Lake in Møre og Romsdal, Norway

- Interactive map of the lake
- Location: Ålesund Municipality, Møre og Romsdal
- Coordinates: 62.4787°N 6.4708°E
- Primary outflows: Litlevatnet
- Basin countries: Norway
- Max. length: 9.5 kilometres (5.9 mi)
- Max. width: 1.3 kilometres (0.81 mi)
- Surface area: 7.3 km^{2} (2.8 sq mi)
- Shore length^{1}: 22.9 kilometres (14.2 mi)
- Surface elevation: 26 metres (85 ft)
- References: NVE
- ^{1} Shore length is not a well-defined measure.

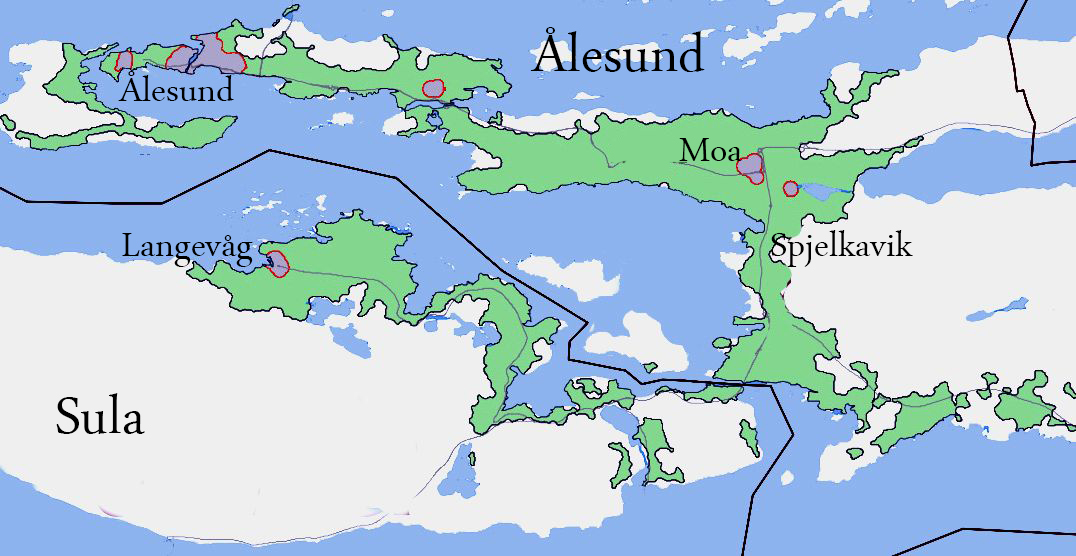

Brusdalsvatnet is a large lake on the island of Uksenøya in Ålesund Municipality which is located in Møre og Romsdal county, Norway. The lake is a reservoir that is the water supply for the nearby city of Ålesund. The 7.3-square-kilometre (2.8 sq mi) lake is about 9.5 by 1.3 kilometres (5.90 mi × 0.81 mi).

== See also ==
- List of lakes in Norway
