= Hans Ingvald Hansen Ratvik =

Norwegian politician

Hans Ingvald Hansen Ratvik (27 January 1883 – 6 June 1966) was a Norwegian politician for the Liberal Party.

He was born in Borgund Municipality in Romsdalen county.

He was elected to the Norwegian Parliament from Møre og Romsdal in 1945, but was not re-elected in 1949. He had previously served in the position of deputy representative during the term 1937–1945.

Ratvik was a member of the municipal council for Borgund Municipality from 1913 to 1919, and then served as mayor in 1919–1922, 1937–1940 and 1945 as well as deputy mayor during the terms 1931–1934 and 1934–1937.
