= Borgund Municipality (Møre og Romsdal) =

Former municipality in Møre og Romsdal, Norway

Borgund Municipality Borgund herred
- Former municipality
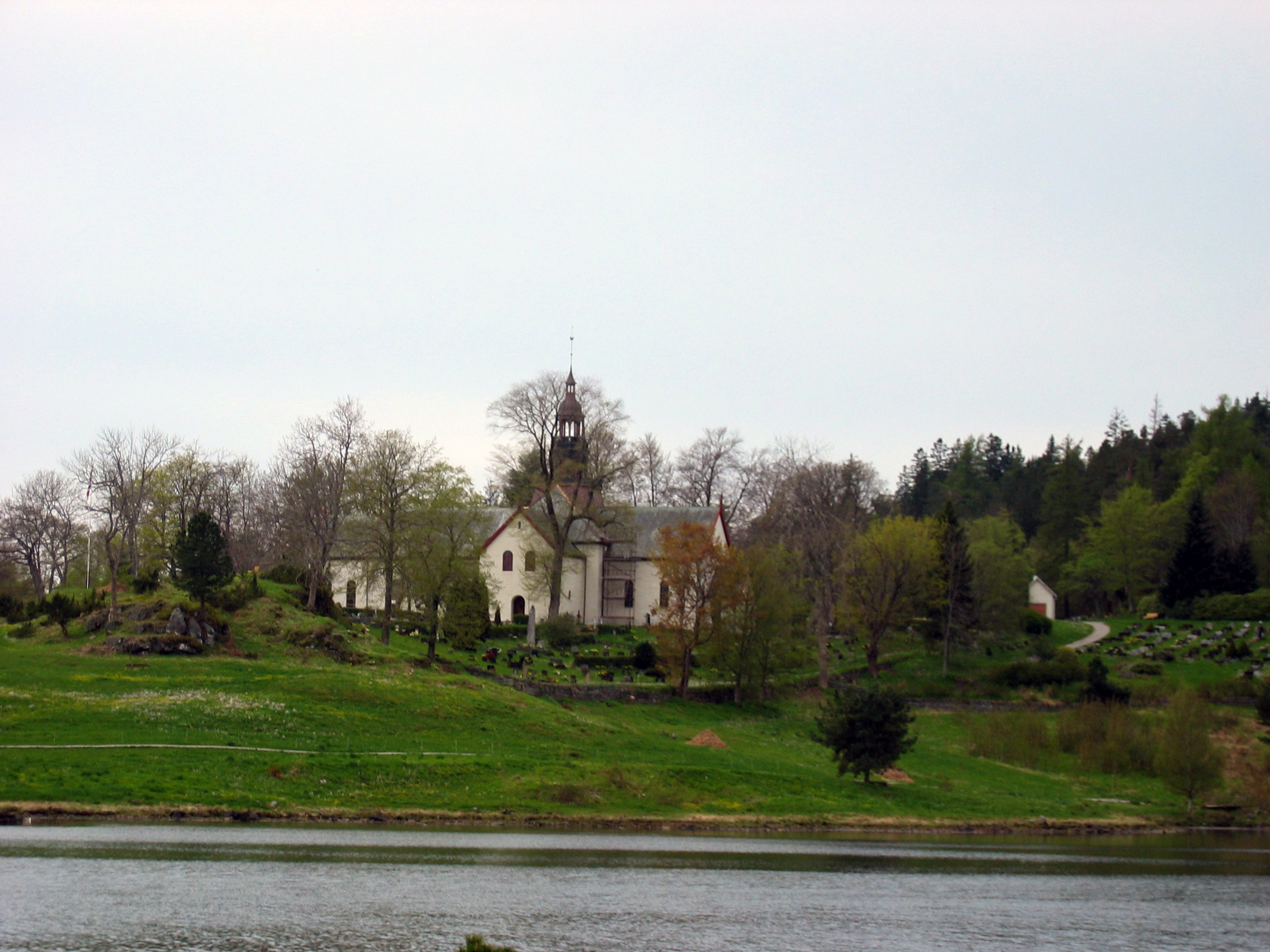
- View of the Borgund church

- Møre og Romsdal within Norway

- Borgund within Møre og Romsdal
- Coordinates: 62°27′58″N 06°14′01″E
- Country: Norway
- County: Møre og Romsdal
- District: Sunnmøre
- Established: 1 Jan 1838
  - Created as: Formannskapsdistrikt
- Disestablished: 1 Jan 1968
  - Succeeded by: Ålesund Municipality
- Administrative centre: Borgund

Government
  - Mayor (1948-1967): Oddmund Sandvik

Area (upon dissolution)
  - Total: 150.8 km^{2} (58.2 sq mi)
  - Rank: #350 in Norway
- Highest elevation: 776.85 m (2,548.7 ft)

Population (1967)
  - Total: 19,516
  - Rank: #28 in Norway
  - Density: 129.4/km^{2} (335/sq mi)
  - Change (10 years): ▲ +27.5%

Official language
  - Norwegian form: Neutral
- Time zone: UTC+01:00 (CET)
  - Summer (DST): UTC+02:00 (CEST)
- ISO 3166 code: NO-1531

Borgund is a former municipality in Møre og Romsdal county, Norway. The 150.8-square-kilometre (58.2 sq mi) municipality existed from 1838 until its dissolution in 1968. The area is now part of Ålesund Municipality in the traditional district of Sunnmøre. The administrative centre of the municipality was at Borgund, near the church, along the Nørvasundet strait.

Borgund originally encompassed the large area north of the Storfjorden and south of the Grytafjorden, from the mainland areas in the eastern part of today's Ålesund Municipality to the islands of today's Giske Municipality and the ocean in the west. The city of Ålesund was located in the central part of Borgund, however, the city itself was not part of Borgund, and it was governed separately. At its dissolution in 1968, Borgund Municipality included the islands of Sula, Humla, Tørla, and Ellingsøya, as well as parts of Uksenøya, Hessa, and Nørve, plus many minor islands throughout the area. The main church for the municipality was Borgund Church, located at Borgund (on the western tip of Uksenøya).

Prior to its dissolution in 1968, the 150.8-square-kilometre (58.2 sq mi) municipality was the 350th largest by area out of the 454 municipalities in Norway. Borgund Municipality was the 28th most populous municipality in Norway with a population of about 19,516. The municipality's population density was 129.4 inhabitants per square kilometre (335/sq mi) and its population had increased by 27.5% over the previous 10-year period.

== History ==
=== Establishment ===
The municipality of Borgund was established on 1 January 1838 (see formannskapsdistrikt law). According to the 1835 census, the municipality had a population of 3,754. In 1849, Borgund Municipality was divided into two parts: the eastern district including the parts on the mainland and the eastern part of Uksenøya island (population: 2,170) become the new Skodje Municipality and the western island district (population: 4,461) remained as a smaller Borgund Municipality.

On 1 January 1908, the islands of Giske, Godøya, and Valderøya in western Borgund (population: 1,708) were separated from the municipality to become the new Giske Municipality. The now smaller Borgund Municipality then had a population of 6,734. On 1 January 1916, a minor border adjustment took place were a small part of Skodje Municipality (population: 14) was transferred into Borgund Municipality. On 1 July 1958, a small part of Hareid Municipality on the island of Sula, with 68 inhabitants, was transferred into Borgund Municipality.

During the 1960s, there were many municipal mergers across Norway due to the work of the Schei Committee. On 1 January 1965, the northern part of Borgund Municipality (including the Gamlem, Søvik, and Grytastranda areas on the mainland and the islands of Bjørnøya, Terøya, and many small islands around them) with 1,191 inhabitants, was administratively transferred into the neighboring Haram Municipality to the north.

=== Incorporation into Ålesund ===
As part of the Schei Committee's report, it was recommended to merge Ålesund and Borgund. There was considerable debate on the incorporation into Ålesund and on what to name the new, larger municipality. The municipal council of Borgund Municipality opposed its own incorporation into Ålesund as worked out by the Schei Committee. However, when the Norwegian Parliament agreed to the incorporation, Borgund's municipal council passed a resolution that the new municipality be named Borgund instead of Ålesund. The case went to the Government of Norway, who drafted a resolution that the name Ålesund should be kept. In the Council of State of 10 March 1967, the cabinet Borten agreed to this, except for Per Borten, Kjell Bondevik, Bjarne Lyngstad, and Dagfinn Vårvik who formally dissented—to no avail. The name Ålesund was recommended, and the Norwegian Parliament passed it.

On 1 January 1968, Borgund Municipality (population: 20,132) ceased to exist when it was merged with the town of Ålesund (population: 18,457), creating the new Ålesund Municipality. It was the most populous municipality in Møre og Romsdal at the time.

On 1 January 1977, the island of Sula (previously a part of Borgund), was separated from Ålesund Municipality to constitute the new Sula Municipality.

=== Name ===
The municipality (originally the parish) is named after the old Borgund farm (Old Norse: Borgund) since the first Borgund Church was built there. The first element is borg which means "castle" or "fortified place". The last element is the suffix -und which means "rich" or "having a lot of something".

=== Churches ===
The Church of Norway had one parish (sokn) within Borgund Municipality. At the time of the municipal dissolution, it was part of the Borgund prestegjeld and the Nordre Sunnmøre prosti (deanery) in the Diocese of Bjørgvin.

Churches in Borgund Municipality
Parish (sokn)	Church name	Location of the church	Year built
Borgund	Borgund Church	Borgund	1130
Borgund	Langevåg Chapel	Langevåg	1948

== Geography ==
At the time of its dissolution, Borgund Municipality included the islands of Sula, Humla, Tørla, and Ellingsøya, as well as parts of Uksenøya, Hessa, and Nørve, plus many minor islands throughout the area. The highest point in the municipality was the 776.85-metre (2,548.7 ft) tall mountain Vardane on the island of Sula. Giske Municipality and Vigra Municipality were located to the west, Haram Municipality was located to the north, and Vatne Municipality and Skodje Municipality were located to the east. Sykkylven Municipality and Vartdal Municipality were located to the south across the Storfjorden.

== Government ==
While it existed, Borgund Municipality was responsible for primary education (through 10th grade), outpatient health services, senior citizen services, welfare and other social services, zoning, economic development, and municipal roads and utilities. The municipality was governed by a municipal council of directly elected representatives. The mayor was indirectly elected by a vote of the municipal council. The municipality was under the jurisdiction of the Frostating Court of Appeal.

=== Municipal council ===
The municipal council (Herredsstyre) of Borgund Municipality was made up of 41 representatives that were elected to four year terms. The tables below show the historical composition of the council by political party.

Borgund herredsstyre 1963–1967
Party name (in Norwegian)	Number of representatives
Labour Party (Arbeiderpartiet)	10
Conservative Party (Høyre)	4
Christian Democratic Party (Kristelig Folkeparti)	6
Centre Party (Senterpartiet)	2
Liberal Party (Venstre)	6
Local List(s) (Lokale lister)	13
Total number of members:	41
Note: On 1 January 1968, Borgund Municipality became part of Ålesund Municipality.

Borgund herredsstyre 1959–1963
Party name (in Norwegian)	Number of representatives
Labour Party (Arbeiderpartiet)	8
Conservative Party (Høyre)	3
Christian Democratic Party (Kristelig Folkeparti)	6
Liberal Party (Venstre)	5
Local List(s) (Lokale lister)	19
Total number of members:	41

Borgund herredsstyre 1955–1959
Party name (in Norwegian)	Number of representatives
Labour Party (Arbeiderpartiet)	6
Conservative Party (Høyre)	2
Christian Democratic Party (Kristelig Folkeparti)	7
Farmers' Party (Bondepartiet)	1
Liberal Party (Venstre)	5
Local List(s) (Lokale lister)	20
Total number of members:	41

Borgund herredsstyre 1951–1955
Party name (in Norwegian)	Number of representatives
Labour Party (Arbeiderpartiet)	5
Liberal Party (Venstre)	3
Local List(s) (Lokale lister)	28
Total number of members:	36

Borgund herredsstyre 1947–1951
Party name (in Norwegian)	Number of representatives
Labour Party (Arbeiderpartiet)	4
Christian Democratic Party (Kristelig Folkeparti)	4
Joint List(s) of Non-Socialist Parties (Borgerlige Felleslister)	7
Local List(s) (Lokale lister)	21
Total number of members:	36

Borgund herredsstyre 1945–1947
Party name (in Norwegian)	Number of representatives
Labour Party (Arbeiderpartiet)	4
Communist Party (Kommunistiske Parti)	1
Local List(s) (Lokale lister)	19
Total number of members:	24

Borgund herredsstyre 1937–1941*
Party name (in Norwegian)	Number of representatives
Labour Party (Arbeiderpartiet)	3
Local List(s) (Lokale lister)	21
Total number of members:	24
Note: Due to the German occupation of Norway during World War II, no elections were held for new municipal councils until after the war ended in 1945.

=== Mayors ===
The mayor (Norwegian: ordfører) of Borgund Municipality was the political leader of the municipality and the chairperson of the municipal council. The following people have held this position:

- 1838–1843: Ferdinand A. Hagerup
- 1843–1845: Ludvig Daae
- 1846–1852: Rasmus Arnet
- 1853–1857: E. Vaagaard
- 1858–1858: Ludvig Daae
- 1872–1893: Colben Aase
- 1893–1895: Johan Nilsen Hoff
- 1896–1913: Carsten Aase
- 1914–1919: L. Nørve
- 1919–1922: Hans Ingvald Hansen Ratvik (V)
- 1923–1925: Martinus Kalvøy
- 1926–1937: Hans Martinusen Blomvik
- 1937–1940: Hans Ingvald Hansen Ratvik (V)
- 1945–1945: Hans Ingvald Hansen Ratvik (V)
- 1946–1947: K. Rødstøl
- 1948–1967: Oddmund Sandvik

== See also ==
- List of former municipalities of Norway
