= Eva Vinje Aurdal =

Norwegian politician (born 1957)

Eva Vinje Aurdal (born 6 December 1957) is a Norwegian politician for the Labour Party.

In the 2009 and 2013 elections she was elected as a deputy representative to the Parliament of Norway from Møre og Romsdal. She has served as an elected member of the municipal council of Ålesund Municipality and Møre og Romsdal county council.

In 2012 she became a board member of the Central Norway Regional Health Authority.
