= Atlantic Sea-Park =

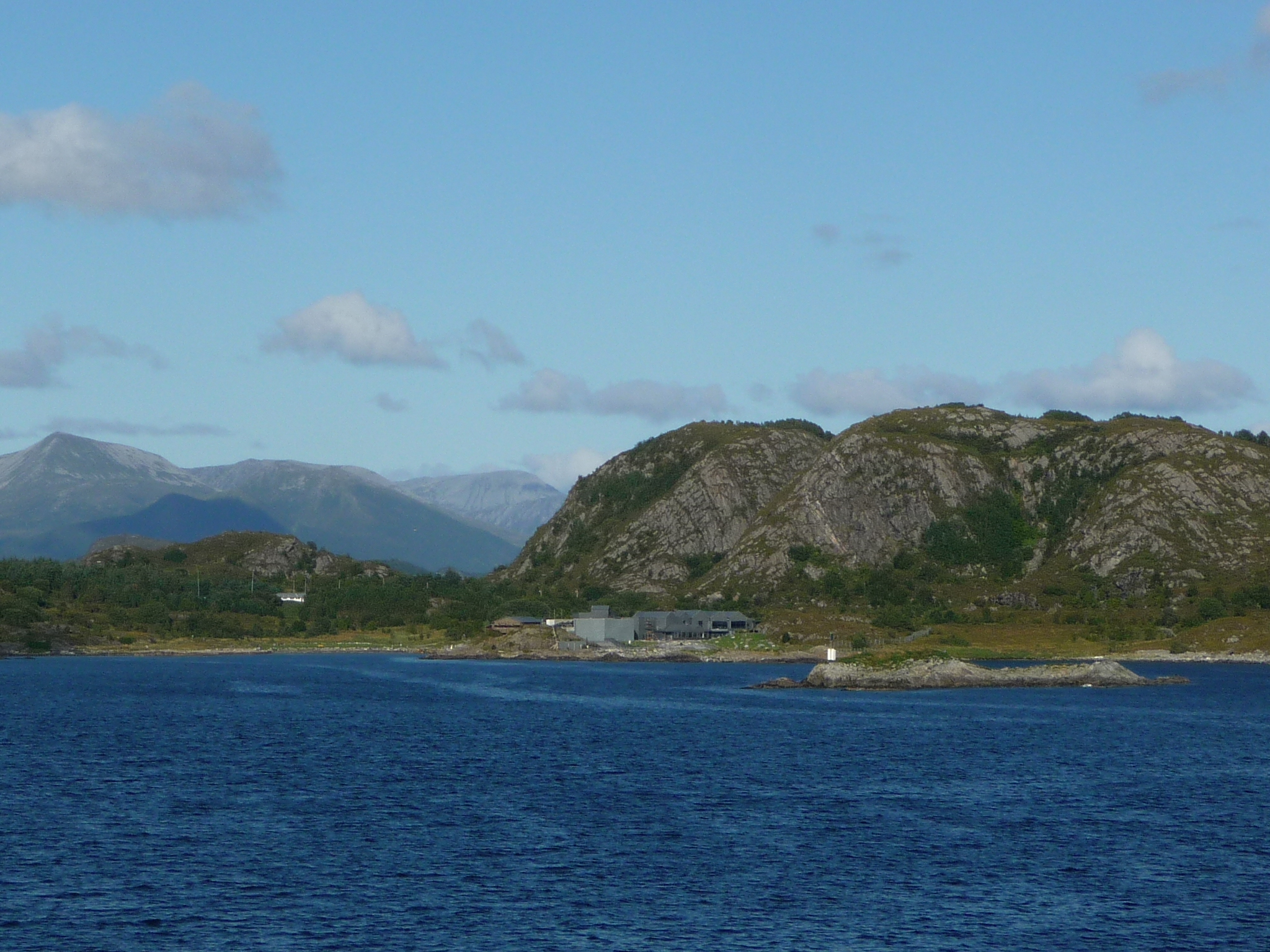
- View from the sea
- Interactive map of Atlantic Sea-Park
- 62°27′56″N 6°5′45″E
- Date opened: 1951
- Location: Ålesund, Norway
- Volume of largest tank: 15,000,000 litres (4,000,000 US gal)
- Website: www.atlanterhavsparken.no/en

The Atlantic Sea-Park (Norwegian: Atlanterhavsparken) is an aquarium in Ålesund, Norway. It was founded in 1951 as a limited company. The current facility was officially opened 15 June 1998.

The Atlantic Sea-Park is one of Scandinavia's largest saltwater aquariums and one of the leading tourist attractions in the area.

== History ==
Founded in 1951 as a limited company, the Aquarium moved in 1967 into more permanent premises in the basement of the "Fishermen House" near Brosundet. In 1976 the aquarium was turned into a foundation, and planning was started for a new facility. The current facility was finally opened on 15 June 1998 during the 150th anniversary of the city of Ålesund.

== Facility ==
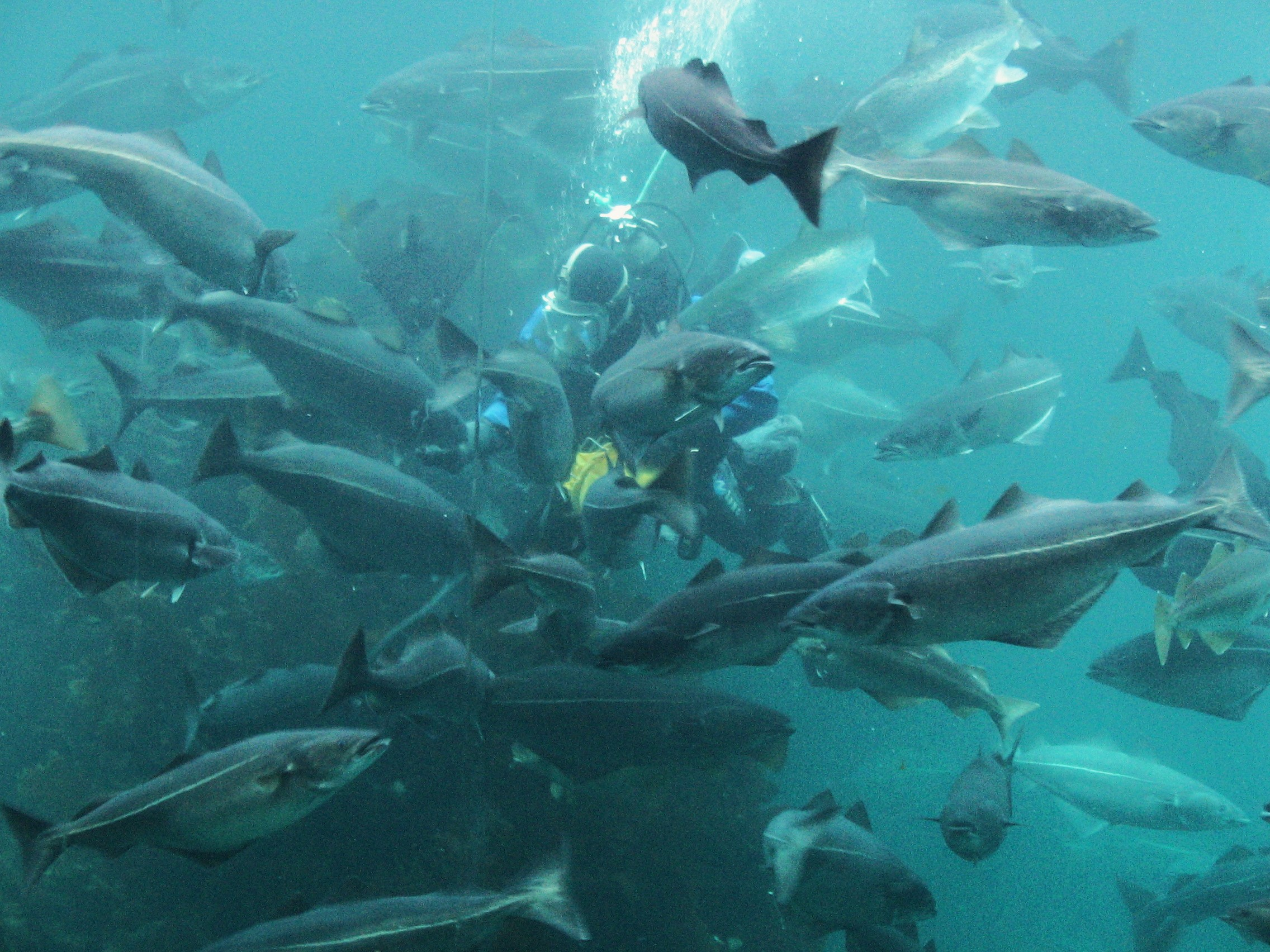

The facility is built into the coastline of Tueneset, about 3.5 kilometres (2.2 mi) west of Ålesund, and offers nearly 4,000 square metres (43,000 ft^{2}) of public and exhibition space, plus 6,000 square metres (65,000 ft^{2}) of outdoor space. The aquarium is located in scenic recreational area that includes a view of the coastal islands and the ocean, as well as hiking trails, fishing, and beaches for swimming and diving.

The exhibition area includes 11 larger landscape aquariums, including 2 open touch pools and 2 activity pools, plus several smaller aquariums. Together the aquariums provide a representative view of life under water along the Norwegian coast and in the northern Atlantic Ocean. Daily dive shows in the 4-million-litre (1.1×10^{6} US gal) Great Atlantic tank let visitors watch the fish being fed. Some of the species in this tank are cod, halibut, conger and salmon. On weekends, visitors can help feed the fish in the open pools. In 2014, the 15-million-litre (4.0×10^{6} US gal) "Selbukta" opened, which is one of the largest seal exhibits in the world. This outside exhibit houses harbor seals.

The exhibition area showcases marine life from all coasts of the Atlantic Ocean, particularly in the waters surrounding Norway. Species from various ocean depths are on display, including marine life from deep water habitats. In order to withstand the pressure in the deep water tanks, the panels needed to be cast 10 inches (25 cm) thick. The nearly seamless bonds required for this mean that visitors to the park get a nearly unimpeded view of the underwater world beyond.

The Aquarium includes a Cafe and gift shop.
