= Uksenøya =

Island in Møre og Romsdal, Norway

Uksenøya Oksenøya
- Interactive map of Uksenøya; Oksenøya

Geography
- Location: Møre og Romsdal, Norway
- Coordinates: 62.4632°N 6.5042°E
- Area: 108 km^{2} (42 sq mi)
- Length: 20 km (12 mi)
- Width: 8 km (5 mi)
- Highest elevation: 576 m (1890 ft)
- Highest point: Meraftafjellet

Administration
- Norway
- County: Møre og Romsdal
- Municipalities: Ålesund Municipality

Demographics
- Population: 27334 (2015)

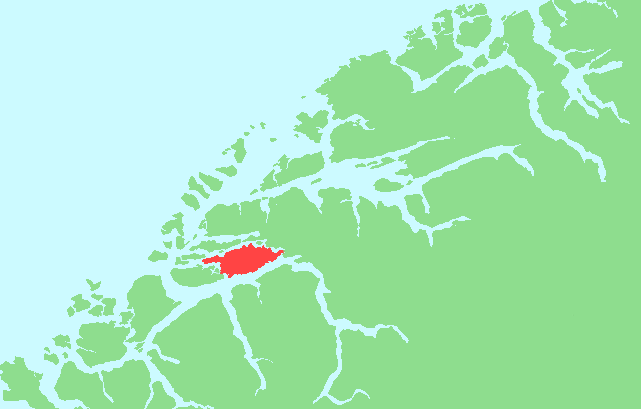
Location of Uksenøya in Møre og Romsdal, Norway

Uksenøya is an island in the Sunnmøre region of Møre og Romsdal county, Norway. The island is located in Ålesund Municipality on the north side of the Storfjorden. Oksenøya has an area of 108 square kilometres (42 sq mi) and it has a population of 27,334 (in 2015). This is the largest island in Ålesund Municipality.

The island was originally part of the old Borgund Municipality, and was later split between Ålesund Municipality and Skodje Municipality in 1968. After the 2020 local government reforms, the island is located entirely in the new Ålesund municipality. It is home to the villages of Spjelkavik, Myrland, Løvika and Valle.

The European route E39 and European route E136 highways run across the island. The island is dominated by the large lake Brusdalsvatnet which covers 7.5 square kilometres (2.9 sq mi) on the northern part of the island and is used as a drinking water reservoir for the municipality (and city) of Ålesund.

== See also ==
- List of islands of Norway
