= Ålesund Municipality =

Municipality in Møre og Romsdal, Norway

Ålesund Municipality Ålesund kommune
- Municipality
- Aalesund (historic name)
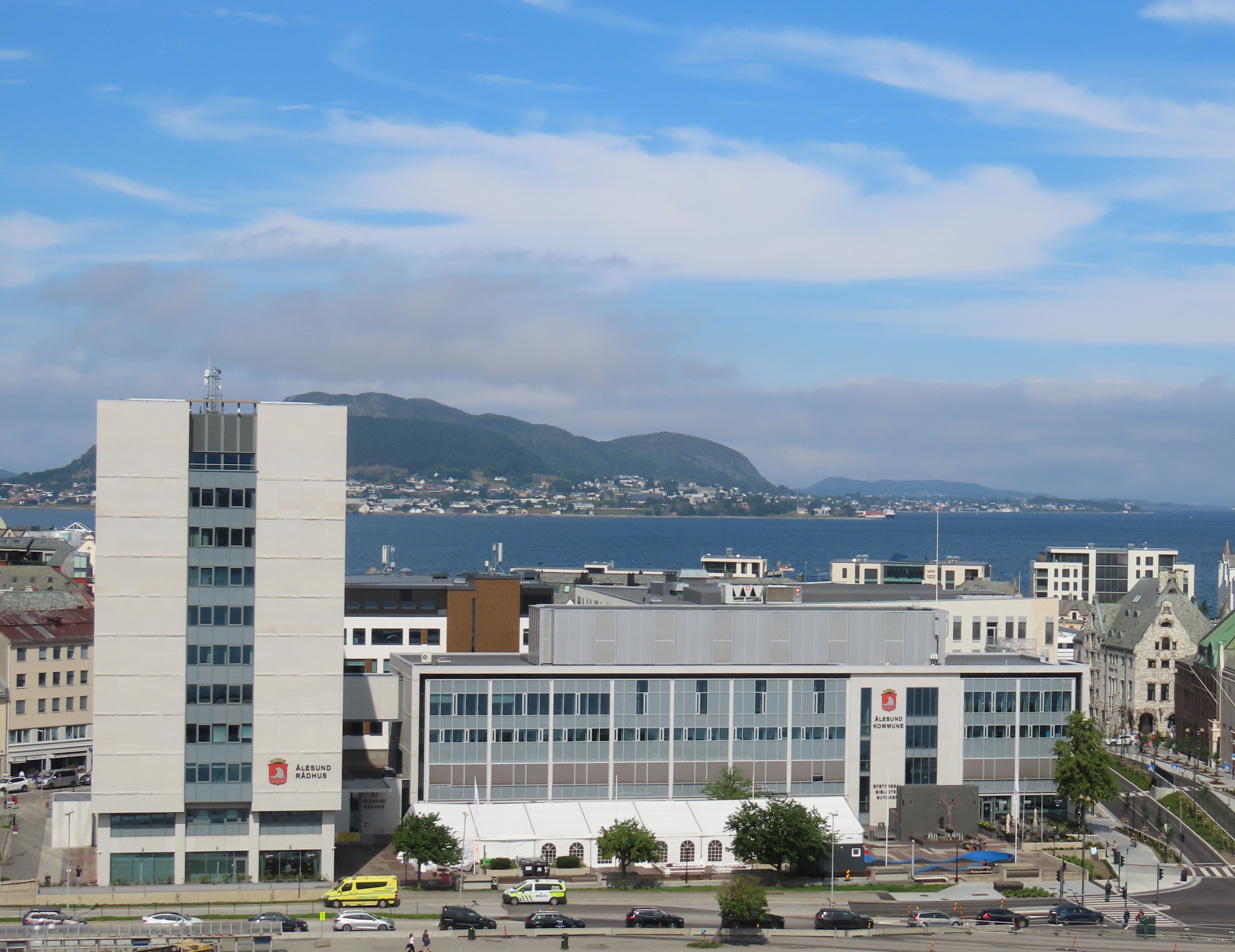
- Ålesund town hall

- Flag Coat of arms

- Møre og Romsdal within Norway

- Ålesund within Møre og Romsdal
- Coordinates: 62°28′40″N 06°11′25″E
- Country: Norway
- County: Møre og Romsdal
- District: Sunnmøre
- Established: 1 January 1838
  - Created as: Formannskapsdistrikt
- Administrative centre: Ålesund

Government
  - Mayor (2023): Håkon Lykkebø Strand (Frp)

Area
  - Total: 371.34 km^{2} (143.38 sq mi)
  - Land: 353.08 km^{2} (136.32 sq mi)
  - Water: 18.26 km^{2} (7.05 sq mi) 4.9%
  - Rank: #245 in Norway
- Highest elevation: 1,429.39 m (4,689.6 ft)

Population (2024)
  - Total: 58,509
  - Rank: #17 in Norway
  - Density: 157.6/km^{2} (408/sq mi)
  - Change (10 years): ▲ +8.9%
- Demonym(s): Ålesundar; Ålesunder

Official language
  - Norwegian form: Neutral
- Time zone: UTC+01:00 (CET)
  - Summer (DST): UTC+02:00 (CEST)
- ISO 3166 code: NO-1508
- Website: Official website

Ålesund (Norwegian pronunciation: [ˈôːɫəsʉn], sometimes spelled Aalesund in English) is a municipality in Møre og Romsdal County, Norway. It is part of the traditional district of Sunnmøre and the centre of the Ålesund Region. The town of Ålesund is the administrative centre of Ålesund Municipality, as well as the principal shipping town of the Sunnmøre district. The town is a sea port and is noted for its concentration of Art Nouveau architecture. Although sometimes internationally spelled by its older name Aalesund, this spelling is obsolete in Norwegian. However, the local football club Aalesunds FK still carries that spelling, having been founded before the official change.

The 371-square-kilometre (143 sq mi) municipality is the 245th largest by area out of the 357 municipalities in Norway. Ålesund Municipality is the 17th most populous municipality in Norway with a population of 58,509. The municipality's population density is 157.6 inhabitants per square kilometre (408/sq mi) and its population has increased by 8.9% over the previous 10-year period.

== History ==
In 1793, the port of Aalesund was granted limited ladested rights. Later, in 1824, it was granted full ladested rights. In 1835, Ålesund had 482 inhabitants. On 1 January 1838, the new formannskapsdistrikt law went into effect, granting limited local self-government to all parishes in Norway. Therefore, on that date, the small ladested of Aalesund became a small municipality with its own council. The small seaport-municipality was entirely surrounded by the large rural Borgund Municipality. In 1848, the small municipality was upgraded to the status of a kjøpstad, a more important market town.

Population development, 1951–2008
Source: Statistics Norway

On 1 January 1875, part of Borgund Municipality (population: 902) was transferred into the Ålesund. In 1922, another part of Borgund Municipality (population: 1,148) was transferred into the growing Ålesund Municipality.

During the 1960s, there were many municipal mergers across Norway due to the work of the Schei Committee. On 1 January 1968, most of the neighbouring Borgund Municipality (population: 20,132) was merged with Ålesund Municipality. This merger vastly increased the land area of the municipality and more than doubled the population of the municipality, for a new total population of 38,589. On 1 January 1977, the island of Sula and some small surrounding islets (population: 6,302) were separated from Ålesund Municipality to form the new Sula Municipality.

On 1 January 2020, Ålesund Municipality was greatly enlarged when Haram Municipality, Skodje Municipality, Sandøy Municipality, and Ørskog Municipality were merged with Ålesund to form a new, much larger Ålesund Municipality.

On 1 January 2024, the northern part of the municipality that used to be part of the old Haram Municipality before 2020 was separated from Ålesund to become a separate Haram Municipality once again.

=== Toponymy ===
A part of the town was originally known as Kaupangen Borgund. The Old Norse word kaupangr means "marketplace" or "town", thus the market town for Borgund. The Old Norse form of the current name was Álasund. The first element of that (probably) is the plural genitive case of áll which means "eel". The last element is sund which means "strait" or "sound". On 21 December 1917, a royal resolution enacted the 1917 Norwegian language reforms. Prior to this change, the name was spelled Aalesund with the digraph "Aa", and after this reform, the name was spelled Ålesund, using the letter Å instead.

== Coat of arms ==
The coat of arms was granted on 1 April 1898. The arms have a red field (background) and the charge is a fishing boat on the water with three cod fish beneath the boat. The charge has a tincture of argent which means it is commonly colored white, but if it is made out of metal, then silver is used. A mural crown is depicted above the escutcheon. The arms symbolize the importance of fishing for Ålesund. The type of ship was typical for the fishing vessels in the 18th and 19th century and is taken from a drawing made in 1762. The waves and three fish were added to the drawing in the arms. The arms were designed by Andreas Bloch. The municipal flag has the same design as the coat of arms.

The arms are shown in the Kaffe Hag album with the boat sailing right instead of sailing left.

== Churches ==
The Church of Norway has eight parishes (sokn) within Ålesund Municipality. It is part of the Nordre Sunnmøre prosti (deanery) in the Diocese of Møre. The seat of the deanery is at Ålesund Church.

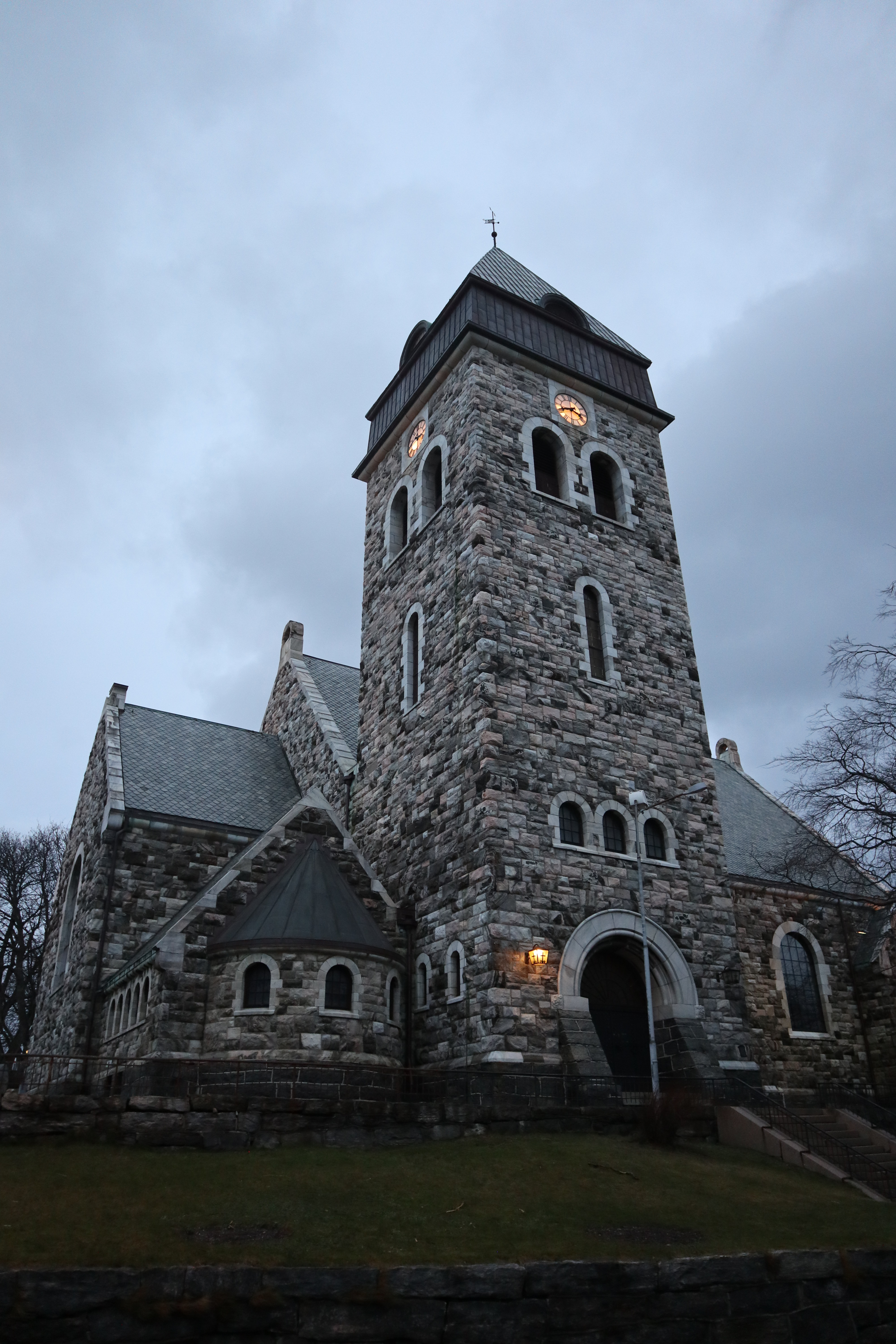
Ålesund Church, 2020

Churches in Ålesund Municipality
| Parish (sokn) | Church name | Location of the church | Year built |
|---|---|---|---|
| Borgund | Borgund Church | Borgund | 1130 |
| Ellingsøy | Ellingsøy Church | Ellingsøya | 1998 |
| Sandøy | Sandøy Church | Sandøya | 1812 |
| Sandøy | Harøy Church | Harøya | 1934 |
| Skodje | Skodje Church | Skodje | 1860 |
| Spjelkavik | Spjelkavik Church | Spjelkavik | 1987 |
| Volsdalen | Volsdalen Church | Nørve (in Ålesund city) | 1974 |
| Ålesund | Ålesund Church | Aspøya (in Ålesund city) | 1909 |
| Ålesund | Skarbøvik Church | Hessa | 1995 |
| Ørskog | Ørskog Church | Sjøholt | 1873 |

== Geography ==
The municipality of Ålesund occupies seven of the large outer islands in the county of Møre og Romsdal: Hessa, Aspøya, Nørve, Uksenøya, Ellingsøya, Humla, and Tørla plus a large area on the mainland along the north side of the Storfjorden. The municipality also includes a small island exclave to the north of Haram Municipality. The exclave includes the islands of Harøya, Finnøya, Sandøya, and Ona. The town centre, Ålesund, is located on the islands Aspøya and Nørve, while Hessa and Uksenøya contain residential areas. There are also many other smaller surrounding islands. The highest point in the municipality is the 1,429.39-metre (4,689.6 ft) tall mountain Lauparen, a tripoint on the border with Ålesund Municipality, Vestnes Municipality, and Fjord Municipality.

Giske Municipality lies to the west, Haram Municipality lies to the north, Vestnes Municipality lies to the northeast, Fjord Municipality lies to the southeast, Sykkylven Municipality lies to the south, and Sula Municipality lies to the southwest. The northern island exclave area of Ålesund Municipality lies about 30 kilometres (19 mi) north of the rest of the municipality. That area is bordered by Aukra Municipality to the east, Molde Municipality to the southeast, and Haram Municipality to the southwest. The open sea lies to the west and north.

Many of the islands in Ålesund Municipality are connected to the mainland via tunnels and bridges. The undersea Ellingsøy Tunnel was built in 1987, connecting Ellingsøya to the town centre more convenient. The tunnel is 3,481 metres (11,421 ft) long, and was upgraded in 2009. The Vigra Fixed Link tunnel and bridge network connects Ålesund Municipality to Giske Municipality to the west. The northern island of Harøya is connected to the mainland via the Nordøyvegen bridge and tunnel network.

Situated 236 kilometres (147 mi) north northeast of the city of Bergen, Ålesund is adjacent to the Hjørundfjorden and Geirangerfjord which are tourist attractions. The Geirangerfjord is part of the UNESCO's list of World Heritage Sites: West Norwegian Fjords.

== Climate ==
Ona is a lighthouse on an island out in the sea, so will have milder winters and colder summers than Ålesund city.

Climate data for Ona II 1991-2020 (20 m)
| Month | Jan | Feb | Mar | Apr | May | Jun | Jul | Aug | Sep | Oct | Nov | Dec | Year |
|---|---|---|---|---|---|---|---|---|---|---|---|---|---|
| Mean daily maximum °C (°F) | 5.4 (41.7) | 4.9 (40.8) | 5.6 (42.1) | 7.8 (46.0) | 10.6 (51.1) | 13 (55) | 15.4 (59.7) | 16.1 (61.0) | 14.2 (57.6) | 10.6 (51.1) | 7.9 (46.2) | 6.1 (43.0) | 9.8 (49.6) |
| Daily mean °C (°F) | 3.9 (39.0) | 3.2 (37.8) | 3.8 (38.8) | 5.5 (41.9) | 8.1 (46.6) | 10.7 (51.3) | 13.2 (55.8) | 14.2 (57.6) | 12.5 (54.5) | 9.2 (48.6) | 6.5 (43.7) | 4.5 (40.1) | 7.9 (46.3) |
| Mean daily minimum °C (°F) | 2 (36) | 1.6 (34.9) | 2.1 (35.8) | 3.8 (38.8) | 6.3 (43.3) | 9.3 (48.7) | 11.6 (52.9) | 12.4 (54.3) | 10.6 (51.1) | 7.2 (45.0) | 4.7 (40.5) | 2.8 (37.0) | 6.2 (43.2) |
| Average precipitation mm (inches) | 138 (5.4) | 120 (4.7) | 118 (4.6) | 74 (2.9) | 64 (2.5) | 74 (2.9) | 73 (2.9) | 110 (4.3) | 142 (5.6) | 153 (6.0) | 130 (5.1) | 161 (6.3) | 1,357 (53.2) |
Source 1: NOAA
Source 2: yr.no (precipitation)

== Government ==
Ålesund Municipality is responsible for primary education (through 10th grade), outpatient health services, senior citizen services, welfare and other social services, zoning, economic development, and municipal roads and utilities. The municipality is governed by a municipal council of directly elected representatives. The mayor is indirectly elected by a vote of the municipal council. The municipality is under the jurisdiction of the Sunnmøre District Court and the Frostating Court of Appeal.

=== Municipal council ===
The municipal council (Kommunestyre) of Ålesund Municipality is made up of 47 representatives that are elected to four year terms. The tables below show the current and historical composition of the council by political party.

Ålesund kommunestyre 2023–2027
| Party name (in Norwegian) | Number of representatives |
|---|---|
| Labour Party (Arbeiderpartiet) | 7 |
| Progress Party (Fremskrittspartiet) | 13 |
| Green Party (Miljøpartiet De Grønne) | 1 |
| Conservative Party (Høyre) | 11 |
| Industry and Business Party (Industri‑ og Næringspartiet) | 1 |
| Christian Democratic Party (Kristelig Folkeparti) | 2 |
| Red Party (Rødt) | 1 |
| Centre Party (Senterpartiet) | 1 |
| Socialist Left Party (Sosialistisk Venstreparti) | 2 |
| Liberal Party (Venstre) | 1 |
| Ålesund List (Ålesundlista) | 7 |
| Total number of members: | 47 |
Note: On 1 January 2024, Haram Municipality was separated from Ålesund Municipality.

Ålesund kommunestyre 2019–2023
| Party name (in Nynorsk) | Number of representatives |
|---|---|
| Labour Party (Arbeidarpartiet) | 16 |
| Progress Party (Framstegspartiet) | 13 |
| Green Party (Miljøpartiet Dei Grøne) | 4 |
| Conservative Party (Høgre) | 15 |
| The Christians Party (Partiet Dei Kristne) | 1 |
| Christian Democratic Party (Kristeleg Folkeparti) | 5 |
| Pensioners' Party (Pensjonistpartiet) | 2 |
| Red Party (Raudt) | 1 |
| Centre Party (Senterpartiet) | 10 |
| Socialist Left Party (Sosialistisk Venstreparti) | 2 |
| Liberal Party (Venstre) | 2 |
| Ålesund List (Ålesundlista) | 6 |
| Total number of members: | 77 |
Note: On 1 January 2020, Ålesund Municipality, Haram Municipality, Sandøy Municipality, Skodje Municipality, and Ørskog Municipality were merged to form the new Ålesund Municipality.

Ålesund kommunestyre 2015–2019
| Party name (in Norwegian) | Number of representatives |
|---|---|
| Labour Party (Arbeiderpartiet) | 18 |
| Progress Party (Fremskrittspartiet) | 8 |
| Green Party (Miljøpartiet De Grønne) | 1 |
| Conservative Party (Høyre) | 9 |
| Christian Democratic Party (Kristelig Folkeparti) | 5 |
| Centre Party (Senterpartiet) | 1 |
| Socialist Left Party (Sosialistisk Venstreparti) | 1 |
| Liberal Party (Venstre) | 3 |
| Ålesund List (Ålesundlista) | 3 |
| Total number of members: | 49 |

Ålesund kommunestyre 2011–2015
| Party name (in Norwegian) | Number of representatives |
|---|---|
| Labour Party (Arbeiderpartiet) | 12 |
| Progress Party (Fremskrittspartiet) | 11 |
| Conservative Party (Høyre) | 14 |
| Christian Democratic Party (Kristelig Folkeparti) | 5 |
| Socialist Left Party (Sosialistisk Venstreparti) | 1 |
| Liberal Party (Venstre) | 4 |
| Ålesund List (Ålesundlista) | 2 |
| Total number of members: | 49 |

Ålesund kommunestyre 2007–2011
| Party name (in Norwegian) | Number of representatives |
|---|---|
| Labour Party (Arbeiderpartiet) | 10 |
| Progress Party (Fremskrittspartiet) | 13 |
| Conservative Party (Høyre) | 8 |
| Christian Democratic Party (Kristelig Folkeparti) | 6 |
| Centre Party (Senterpartiet) | 1 |
| Socialist Left Party (Sosialistisk Venstreparti) | 3 |
| Liberal Party (Venstre) | 3 |
| Cross-party list for Ålesund (Tverrpolitisk liste for Ålesund) | 5 |
| Total number of members: | 49 |

Ålesund kommunestyre 2003–2007
| Party name (in Norwegian) | Number of representatives |
|---|---|
| Labour Party (Arbeiderpartiet) | 10 |
| Progress Party (Fremskrittspartiet) | 18 |
| Conservative Party (Høyre) | 8 |
| Christian Democratic Party (Kristelig Folkeparti) | 7 |
| Pensioners' Party (Pensjonistpartiet) | 1 |
| Centre Party (Senterpartiet) | 2 |
| Socialist Left Party (Sosialistisk Venstreparti) | 6 |
| Liberal Party (Venstre) | 1 |
| Cross-party list for Ålesund (Tverrpolitisk liste for Ålesund) | 7 |
| Common list for traffic, environment, and schools in Ålesund (Fellesliste for trafikk, miljø og skole i Ålesund) | 1 |
| Total number of members: | 61 |

Ålesund kommunestyre 1999–2003
| Party name (in Norwegian) | Number of representatives |
|---|---|
| Labour Party (Arbeiderpartiet) | 10 |
| Progress Party (Fremskrittspartiet) | 10 |
| Conservative Party (Høyre) | 11 |
| Christian Democratic Party (Kristelig Folkeparti) | 10 |
| Red Electoral Alliance (Rød Valgallianse) | 1 |
| Centre Party (Senterpartiet) | 1 |
| Socialist Left Party (Sosialistisk Venstreparti) | 4 |
| Liberal Party (Venstre) | 1 |
| Cross-party list (Tverrpolitisk liste) | 13 |
| Total number of members: | 61 |

Ålesund kommunestyre 1995–1999
| Party name (in Norwegian) | Number of representatives |
|---|---|
| Labour Party (Arbeiderpartiet) | 12 |
| Progress Party (Fremskrittspartiet) | 9 |
| Conservative Party (Høyre) | 10 |
| Christian Democratic Party (Kristelig Folkeparti) | 7 |
| Red Electoral Alliance (Rød Valgallianse) | 1 |
| Centre Party (Senterpartiet) | 3 |
| Socialist Left Party (Sosialistisk Venstreparti) | 3 |
| Liberal Party (Venstre) | 2 |
| Cross-party list for Ålesund (Tverrpolitisk liste for Ålesund) | 14 |
| Total number of members: | 61 |

Ålesund kommunestyre 1991–1995
| Party name (in Norwegian) | Number of representatives |
|---|---|
| Labour Party (Arbeiderpartiet) | 14 |
| Progress Party (Fremskrittspartiet) | 7 |
| Conservative Party (Høyre) | 17 |
| Christian Democratic Party (Kristelig Folkeparti) | 8 |
| Red Electoral Alliance (Rød Valgallianse) | 1 |
| Centre Party (Senterpartiet) | 4 |
| Socialist Left Party (Sosialistisk Venstreparti) | 7 |
| Liberal Party (Venstre) | 3 |
| Total number of members: | 61 |

Ålesund kommunestyre 1987–1991
| Party name (in Norwegian) | Number of representatives |
|---|---|
| Labour Party (Arbeiderpartiet) | 17 |
| Progress Party (Fremskrittspartiet) | 11 |
| Conservative Party (Høyre) | 16 |
| Christian Democratic Party (Kristelig Folkeparti) | 8 |
| Pensioners' Party (Pensjonistpartiet) | 4 |
| Red Electoral Alliance (Rød Valgallianse) | 1 |
| Centre Party (Senterpartiet) | 1 |
| Socialist Left Party (Sosialistisk Venstreparti) | 3 |
| Joint list of the Liberal Party (Venstre) and Liberal People's Party (Liberale Folkepartiet) | 4 |
| Total number of members: | 61 |

Ålesund kommunestyre 1983–1987
| Party name (in Norwegian) | Number of representatives |
|---|---|
| Labour Party (Arbeiderpartiet) | 19 |
| Progress Party (Fremskrittspartiet) | 5 |
| Conservative Party (Høyre) | 18 |
| Christian Democratic Party (Kristelig Folkeparti) | 9 |
| Red Electoral Alliance (Rød Valgallianse) | 1 |
| Centre Party (Senterpartiet) | 2 |
| Socialist Left Party (Sosialistisk Venstreparti) | 3 |
| Liberal Party (Venstre) | 4 |
| Total number of members: | 61 |

Ålesund kommunestyre 1979–1983
| Party name (in Norwegian) | Number of representatives |
|---|---|
| Labour Party (Arbeiderpartiet) | 17 |
| Progress Party (Fremskrittspartiet) | 1 |
| Conservative Party (Høyre) | 21 |
| Christian Democratic Party (Kristelig Folkeparti) | 10 |
| New People's Party (Nye Folkepartiet) | 1 |
| Red Electoral Alliance (Rød Valgallianse) | 1 |
| Centre Party (Senterpartiet) | 2 |
| Socialist Left Party (Sosialistisk Venstreparti) | 2 |
| Liberal Party (Venstre) | 6 |
| Total number of members: | 61 |

Ålesund kommunestyre 1975–1979
| Party name (in Norwegian) | Number of representatives |
|---|---|
| Labour Party (Arbeiderpartiet) | 17 |
| Conservative Party (Høyre) | 14 |
| Christian Democratic Party (Kristelig Folkeparti) | 13 |
| New People's Party (Nye Folkepartiet) | 3 |
| Centre Party (Senterpartiet) | 3 |
| Socialist Left Party (Sosialistisk Venstreparti) | 2 |
| Liberal Party (Venstre) | 6 |
| Non-party election list for Sula (Upolitisk Valliste for Sula) | 8 |
| Non-party election list for Borgund (Upolitisk Valliste for Borgund) | 3 |
| Total number of members: | 69 |
Note: On 1 January 1977, Sula Municipality was separated from Ålesund Municipality.

Ålesund kommunestyre 1971–1975
| Party name (in Norwegian) | Number of representatives |
|---|---|
| Labour Party (Arbeiderpartiet) | 20 |
| Conservative Party (Høyre) | 10 |
| Christian Democratic Party (Kristelig Folkeparti) | 10 |
| Centre Party (Senterpartiet) | 5 |
| Socialist People's Party (Sosialistisk Folkeparti) | 3 |
| Liberal Party (Venstre) | 12 |
| Local List(s) (Lokale lister) | 9 |
| Total number of members: | 69 |

Ålesund kommunestyre 1967–1971
| Party name (in Norwegian) | Number of representatives |
|---|---|
| Labour Party (Arbeiderpartiet) | 23 |
| Conservative Party (Høyre) | 12 |
| Christian Democratic Party (Kristelig Folkeparti) | 8 |
| Centre Party (Senterpartiet) | 2 |
| Socialist People's Party (Sosialistisk Folkeparti) | 3 |
| Liberal Party (Venstre) | 14 |
| Local List(s) (Lokale lister) | 7 |
| Total number of members: | 69 |
Note: On 1 January 1968, Borgund Municipality became part of Ålesund Municipality.

Ålesund bystyre 1963–1967
| Party name (in Norwegian) | Number of representatives |
|---|---|
| Labour Party (Arbeiderpartiet) | 27 |
| Conservative Party (Høyre) | 12 |
| Christian Democratic Party (Kristelig Folkeparti) | 6 |
| Socialist People's Party (Sosialistisk Folkeparti) | 1 |
| Liberal Party (Venstre) | 15 |
| Total number of members: | 61 |

Ålesund bystyre 1959–1963
| Party name (in Norwegian) | Number of representatives |
|---|---|
| Labour Party (Arbeiderpartiet) | 25 |
| Conservative Party (Høyre) | 11 |
| Communist Party (Kommunistiske Parti) | 1 |
| Christian Democratic Party (Kristelig Folkeparti) | 6 |
| Liberal Party (Venstre) | 18 |
| Total number of members: | 61 |

Ålesund bystyre 1955–1959
| Party name (in Norwegian) | Number of representatives |
|---|---|
| Labour Party (Arbeiderpartiet) | 27 |
| Conservative Party (Høyre) | 11 |
| Communist Party (Kommunistiske Parti) | 1 |
| Christian Democratic Party (Kristelig Folkeparti) | 7 |
| Liberal Party (Venstre) | 15 |
| Total number of members: | 61 |

Ålesund bystyre 1951–1955
| Party name (in Norwegian) | Number of representatives |
|---|---|
| Labour Party (Arbeiderpartiet) | 26 |
| Conservative Party (Høyre) | 10 |
| Communist Party (Kommunistiske Parti) | 1 |
| Christian Democratic Party (Kristelig Folkeparti) | 7 |
| Liberal Party (Venstre) | 16 |
| Total number of members: | 60 |

Ålesund bystyre 1947–1951
| Party name (in Norwegian) | Number of representatives |
|---|---|
| Labour Party (Arbeiderpartiet) | 21 |
| Conservative Party (Høyre) | 11 |
| Communist Party (Kommunistiske Parti) | 4 |
| Christian Democratic Party (Kristelig Folkeparti) | 7 |
| Liberal Party (Venstre) | 17 |
| Total number of members: | 60 |

Ålesund bystyre 1945–1947
| Party name (in Norwegian) | Number of representatives |
|---|---|
| Labour Party (Arbeiderpartiet) | 24 |
| Conservative Party (Høyre) | 9 |
| Communist Party (Kommunistiske Parti) | 6 |
| Christian Democratic Party (Kristelig Folkeparti) | 8 |
| Liberal Party (Venstre) | 13 |
| Total number of members: | 60 |

Ålesund bystyre 1937–1941*
| Party name (in Norwegian) | Number of representatives |
|---|---|
| Labour Party (Arbeiderpartiet) | 25 |
| Conservative Party (Høyre) | 11 |
| Liberal Party (Venstre) | 22 |
| Local List(s) (Lokale lister) | 2 |
| Total number of members: | 60 |
Note: Due to the German occupation of Norway during World War II, no elections were held for new municipal councils until after the war ended in 1945.

Ålesund bystyre 1934–1937
| Party name (in Norwegian) | Number of representatives |
|---|---|
| Labour Party (Arbeiderpartiet) | 21 |
| Conservative Party (Høyre) | 13 |
| Communist Party (Kommunistiske Parti) | 1 |
| Liberal Party (Venstre) | 20 |
| Total number of members: | 60 |

Ålesund bystyre 1931–1934
| Party name (in Norwegian) | Number of representatives |
|---|---|
| Labour Party (Arbeiderpartiet) | 23 |
| Temperance Party (Avholdspartiet) | 6 |
| Communist Party (Kommunistiske Parti) | 1 |
| Liberal Party (Venstre) | 17 |
| Joint list of the Conservative Party (Høyre) and the Free-minded People's Party (Frisinnede Folkeparti) | 13 |
| Total number of members: | 60 |

Ålesund bystyre 1928–1931
| Party name (in Norwegian) | Number of representatives |
|---|---|
| Labour Party (Arbeiderpartiet) | 20 |
| Temperance Party (Avholdspartiet) | 7 |
| Communist Party (Kommunistiske Parti) | 5 |
| Liberal Party (Venstre) | 15 |
| Joint list of the Conservative Party (Høyre) and the Free-minded Liberal Party (Frisinnede Venstre) | 8 |
| Local List(s) (Lokale lister) | 5 |
| Total number of members: | 60 |

Ålesund bystyre 1925–1928
| Party name (in Norwegian) | Number of representatives |
|---|---|
| Labour Party (Arbeiderpartiet) | 4 |
| Temperance Party (Avholdspartiet) | 9 |
| Social Democratic Labour Party (Socialdemokratiske Arbeiderparti) | 14 |
| Liberal Party (Venstre) | 16 |
| Joint list of the Conservative Party (Høyre) and the Free-minded Liberal Party (Frisinnede Venstre) | 13 |
| Workers' Common List (Arbeidernes fellesliste) | 4 |
| Total number of members: | 60 |

Ålesund bystyre 1922–1925
| Party name (in Norwegian) | Number of representatives |
|---|---|
| Labour Party (Arbeiderpartiet) | 11 |
| Temperance Party (Avholdspartiet) | 8 |
| Social Democratic Labour Party (Socialdemokratiske Arbeiderparti) | 20 |
| Liberal Party (Venstre) | 7 |
| Joint list of the Conservative Party (Høyre) and the Free-minded Liberal Party (Frisinnede Venstre) | 14 |
| Total number of members: | 60 |

Aalesund bystyre 1919–1922
| Party name (in Norwegian) | Number of representatives |
|---|---|
| Labour Party (Arbeiderpartiet) | 22 |
| Temperance Party (Avholdspartiet) | 9 |
| Liberal Party (Venstre) | 9 |
| Joint list of the Conservative Party (Høyre) and the Free-minded Liberal Party (Frisinnede Venstre) | 12 |
| Total number of members: | 52 |

=== Mayors ===
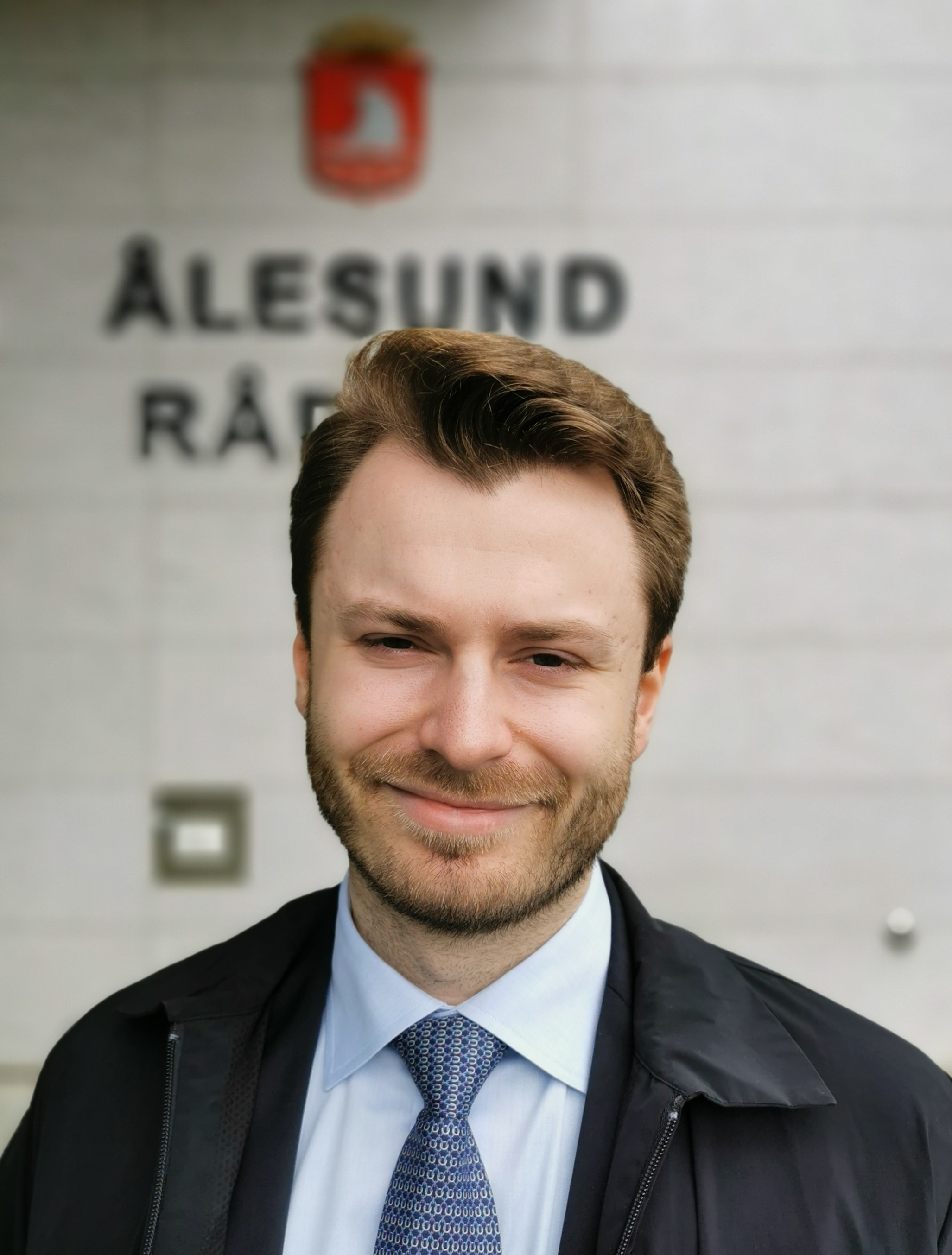
Håkon Lykkebø Strand (2026)

The mayor (Norwegian: ordfører) of Ålesund Municipality is the political leader of the municipality and the chairperson of the municipal council. Here is a list of people who have held this position:

- 1838–1839: Peder Tonning
- 1840–1840: Peder Jalles Øwre
- 1841–1842: Niels Albert Vogt Tonning
- 1843–1843: Lauritz Peder Tostrup
- 1844–1844: Niels Albert Vogt Tonning
- 1845–1845: Hans Lund Schjølberg
- 1846–1848: Andreas Mathias Sanne
- 1849–1852: Anton Magnus Søeberg
- 1853–1853: Andreas Mathias Sanne
- 1854–1855: Christian August Bendixen
- 1856–1856: Andreas Mathias Sanne
- 1857–1857: Christian August Bendixen
- 1858–1860: Joakim Anderssen
- 1861–1863: Andreas Mathias Sanne
- 1864–1864: Johannes Aarflot
- 1865–1867: Jens Thuesen
- 1868–1870: Andreas Mathias Sanne
- 1871–1871: Leonhard Elisar Holmboe
- 1872–1875: Christian Henrichsen
- 1876–1881: Johannes Aarflot (H)
- 1882–1882: Joakim Andersen
- 1883–1891: Johannes Aarflot (H)
- 1892–1895: Ivar Waldemar Brøgger (H)
- 1896–1896: Joachim Holmboe Rønneberg (H)
- 1897–1898: Anton Johan Rønneberg (V)
- 1899–1901: Ivar Waldermar Brøgger (H)
- 1902–1904: Henrik Frisak (V)
- 1905–1907: Johannes Aarflot Jr. (H)
- 1908–1909: Henrik Frisak (V)
- 1910–1910: Jørgen Anton Johnsen Øwre (H)
- 1911–1912: Kristian Friis Petersen (V)
- 1913–1913: Kristian Fredrik Brøgger
- 1914–1915: Anders N. Aarsæther
- 1916–1916: Peter Elias Karolius Sæter (V)
- 1917–1918: Tore Toresen Berset (V)
- 1919–1919: Peter Elias Karolius Sæter (V)
- 1920–1921: Anton Ludvig Alvestad (Ap)
- 1922–1922: Tore Toresen Berset (V)
- 1923–1925: Elias Røsvik (Ap)
- 1926–1927: Tore Toresen Berset (V)
- 1928–1928: Kristoffer Bernhard Hagen (V)
- 1929–1930: Jacob Rørstad (V)
- 1931–1931: Rasmus Theodor Berg (V)
- 1932–1933: Kristoffer Bernhard Hagen (V)
- 1934–1934: Harald Kristian Thoresen (Ap)
- 1935–1935: Jon Petrus Hovde (V)
- 1936–1936: Kristoffer Bernhard Hagen (V)
- 1937–1937: Jon Petrus Hovde (V)
- 1938–1940: Rasmus Theodor Berg (V)
- 1940–1941: Nicolai Helseth (NS)
- 1941–1945: Gustav Sveen (NS)
- 1945–1945: Rasmus Theodor Berg (V)
- 1946–1947: Harald Kristian Thoresen (Ap)
- 1948–1949: Kristian Langlo (V)
- 1950–1951: Bjarne Fjærtoft (V)
- 1952–1953: Ole Grebstad (V)
- 1954–1955: Paulus Giørtz (H)
- 1956–1958: Oscar Andreas Ingebrigtsen (Ap)
- 1959–1965: Dagfinn Flem (V)
- 1966–1967: Karsten Larsen (H)
- 1968–1975: Gustav M. Flisnes (DNF)
- 1976–1977: Johannes Giske (KrF)
- 1978–1979: Olav Helge Balsnes (H)
- 1980–1987: Svein Tømmerdal (H)
- 1988–1989: Leidulf Dahle (Ap)
- 1990–1993: Kjell-Arne Slinning (KrF)
- 1994–1995: Asbjørn Måløy (Ap)
- 1995–1999: Asbjørn Rutgerson (LL)
- 1999–2007: Arve Tonning (H)
- 2007–2015: Bjørn Tømmerdal (H)
- 2015–2023: Eva Vinje Aurdal (Ap)
- 2023–present: Håkon Lykkebø Strand (FrP)

== Economy ==
The town of Ålesund has the most important fishing harbour in Norway. The town's fishing fleet is one of the most modern in Europe. In the 1950s and 1960s, Ålesund was one of the chief stations of the herring fishery business.

In relation to the relatively large fishing fleet belonging to Ålesund and nearby harbours, a large shipbuilding and ship equipment industry has evolved. There are no longer any yards building ships in Ålesund proper; its last shipyard – Liaaen Shipyard - evolved into ship repairs and since the late 1990s has mainly been serving the offshore industry through the company Liaaen Technology that merged and rebranded to Strata Møre in 2007. In the neighbouring communities, however, shipyards continue to operate successfully: Vard, Ulstein Verft, Kleven Maritime, and Havyard Group.

When oil was found in the North Sea in the 1970s, the local fishing fleet ship owners seized the opportunity and rebuilt fishing vessels to serve the infant oil exploration and production industry. Soon they were able to build purpose-designed vessels at local shipyards to serve the North Sea oil adventure even better. Today this has become a cornerstone industry in and around Ålesund through leading offshore supply ship owning companies Farstad, Bourbon, Olympic, Havila, and Rem. Serving the ship building industry a large number of equipment manufacturers has evolved: Rolls-Royce, Odim, Sperre, Optimar, Ship Equip, Jets, and many more.

Ålesund and its surroundings also have a large furniture industry. Some well-known household items are manufactured here. To the east of Ålesund lies the Sykkylven Municipality where the Ekornes factory, producing furniture such as the StressLess chair, is located. Håhjem, another village near Ålesund, contains the headquarters of the Stokke company.

Ålesund is also one of the harbours at which the Hurtigruten arrives two times per day. As the cultural center of the region and with close proximity to the fjords, Ålesund is a tourist attraction. The Atlanterhavsparken aquarium is another tourist attraction.

== Twin towns – sister cities ==
Ålesund has sister city agreements with the following places:

- Akureyri, Iceland (1949)
- Borgo a Mozzano, Italy (1979)
- Lahti, Finland (1947)
- Peterhead, Scotland, United Kingdom (1967)
- Randers, Denmark (1947)
- Tacoma, United States (1986)
- Västerås, Sweden (1947)

== See also ==
- Aalesund ship
- Shetland bus
