= Carsten Hopstock =

Norwegian museum curator and art historian

Carsten Henrik Hopstock
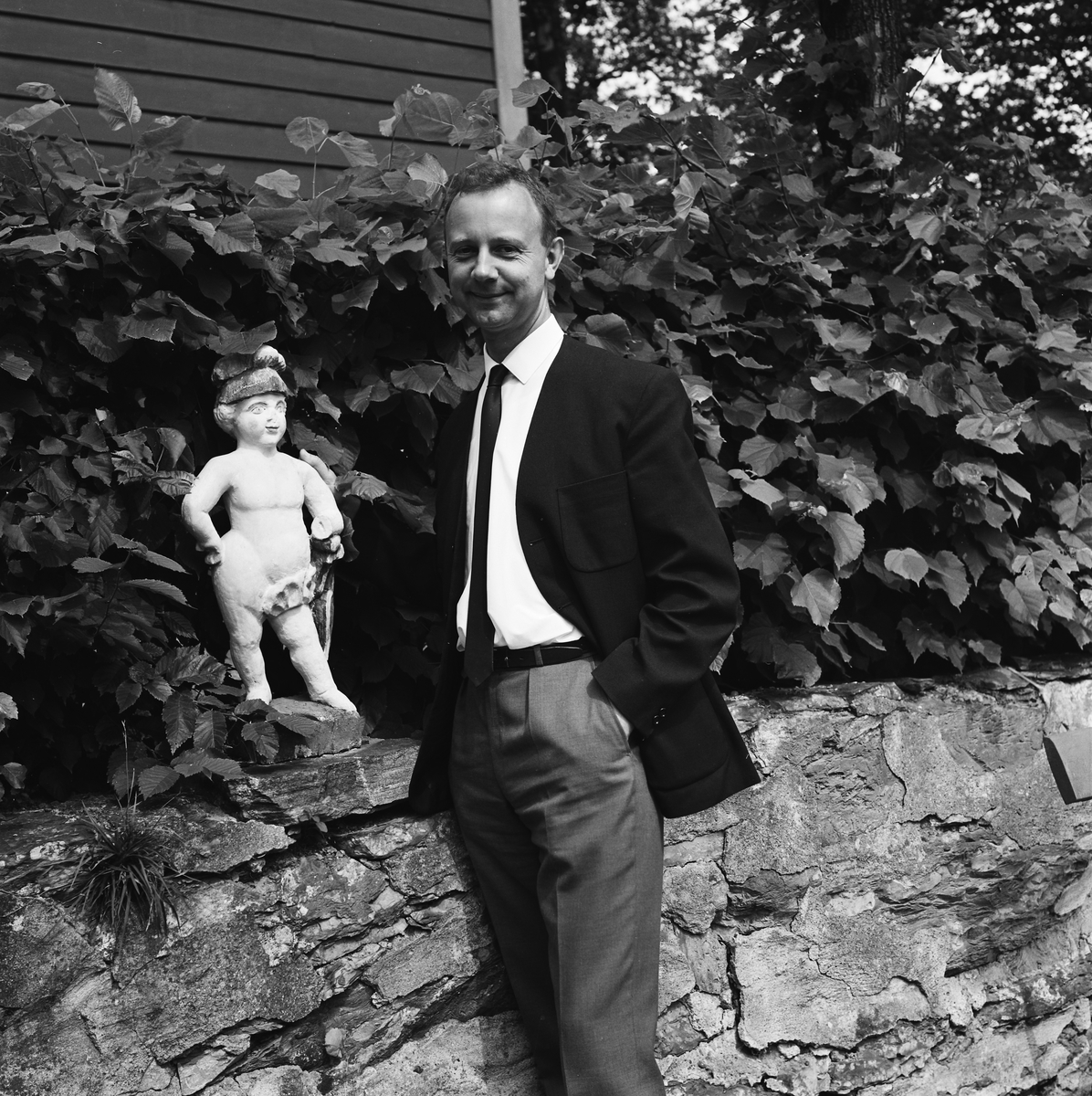
- Born: 13 March 1924; Kragerø, Norway
- Died: 31 January 2014 (aged 89); Oslo, Norway
- Education: University of Oslo
- Occupations: curator and historian
- Employer: Norwegian Museum of Cultural History

Carsten Henrik Hopstock (13 March 1924 – 31 January 2014) was a Norwegian museum curator and art historian.

== Biography ==
Hopstock was born in Kragerø in Telemark county, Norway. He was the son of pharmacist Frantz Philip Hopstock (1891–1977) and Lilly Haanshus (1887–1982). He graduated from the University of Oslo with the mag.art. degree (PhD equivalent) in 1953, majoring in art history and minoring in history and archaeology. In 1958 Hopstock married painter and writer Kirsti Marianne Nygård-Nilssen, daughter of Arne Nygård-Nilssen and Maja Refsum. He died in January 2014.

Hopstock's professional career began as early as 1945 with a position as curator at the newly established Berg-Kragerø Museum at Kragerø. In 1954 he was hired as a curator at the Norwegian Museum of Cultural History. As such he was responsible for Bogstad Manor from 1955 and the Norwegian Pharmacy Museum (Norsk Farmasihistorisk Museum) from 1963.

Important books include Stoler og stiler (1955 with Stephan Tschudi-Madsen), Norwegian Design (1957), Rosendal. Baroni og bygning (1965 with Stephan Tschudi-Madsen), Buchholmgården i Kragerø (1965), Stabbestad – Kragerøslekten Heuchs lystgård (1967), Kragerø apotek 1770–1970 (1970), Søndre Kalstad og Kragerøslekten Biørn (1975) and Jarlsberg. En norsk grevelig residens (1983 with Wasberg, Kavli and Hjelde). He contributed to volume three of Norges kulturhistorie. His ultimate work was the two-volume Bogstad. Et storgods gjennom 300 år in 1997.

He was a member of the Norwegian Academy for Language and Literature.
