= Hovden =

Hovden is used for many place names and surnames in Norway. One meaning of the name comes from the Old Norse word for head (hovud), which refers to a steep, overhanging mountain or cliff in the vicinity (when used as a place name). The second meaning is derived from the Norse word for sacrificial site (hov).

Hovden may refer to:

== Places ==
=== Norway ===
- Hovden, Agder, a village in the municipality of Bykle in Agder county
- Hovden, Kinn, an island in the municipality of Kinn in Vestland county
- Hovden, Nordland, a fishing village in the municipality of Bø in Nordland county

== People ==
- Anders Hovden, a Norwegian hymn writer, priest, author, and popular speaker
- Knut Hovden, owner of Hovden (sardine) Cannery on Cannery Row in Monterey California (USA) 1916-1973 (now the world-famous Monterey Bay Aquarium)
- Magne Hovden, a Norwegian writer

== Other ==
- Hovden Chapel, now called Fjellgardane Church, a church in Hovden in Bykle municipality in Aust-Agder, Norway
- Hovden Cannery, a sardine cannery in Monterey, California (USA) that was in operation from 1916 to 1973 (now the world-famous Monterey Bay Aquarium)
- Ørsta–Volda Airport, Hovden, an airport in the municipality of Ørsta, Møre og Romsdal, Norway
