= Stephan Tschudi-Madsen =

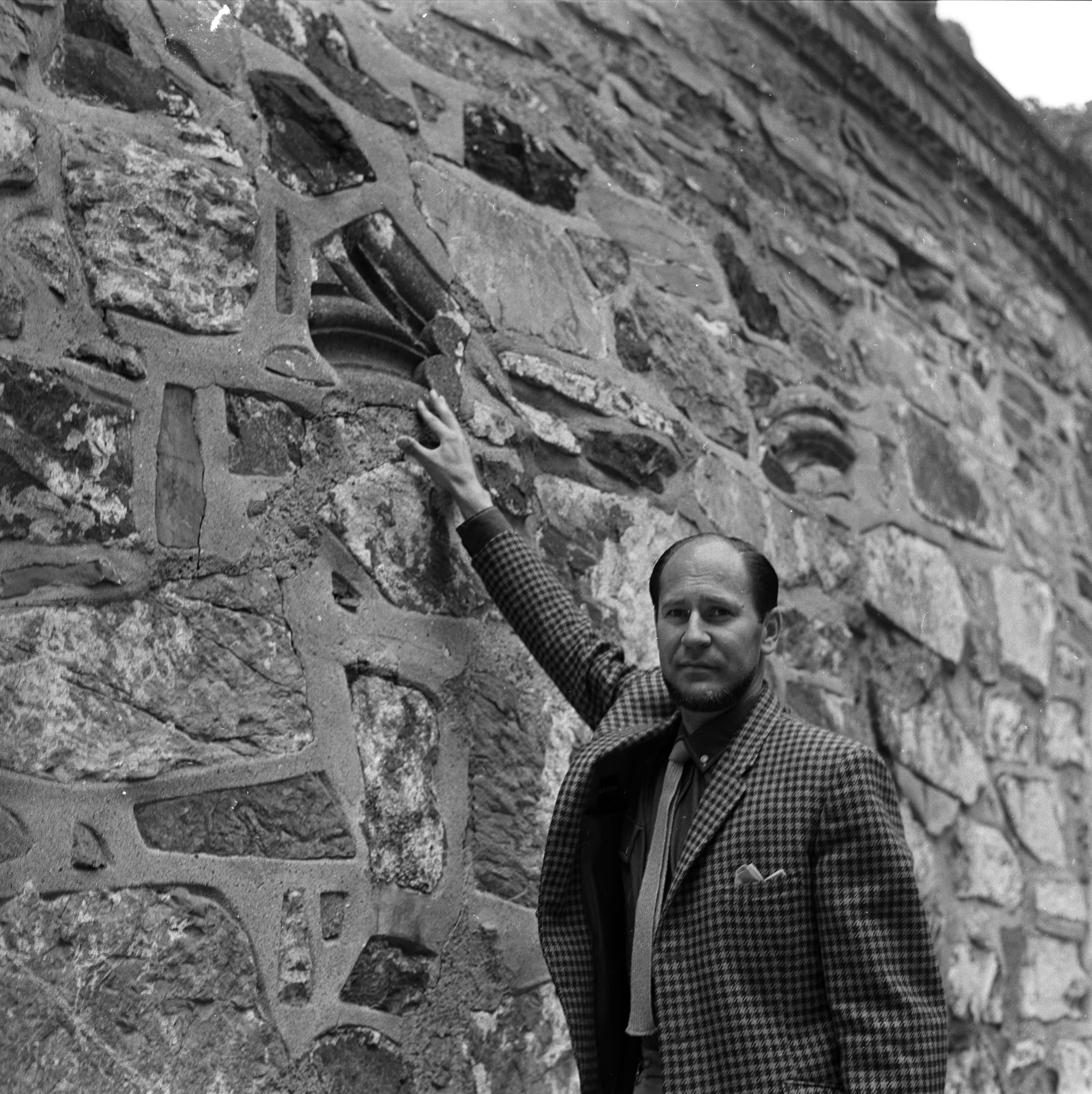
Stephan Tschudi Madsen At the wall of Akershus Castle and Fortress, Oslo.

Stephan Tschudi-Madsen (25 August 1923 – 11 October 2007) was a Norwegian art historian. Tschudi-Madsen was the first antiquarian at the Norwegian Directorate for Cultural Heritage from 1959 until 1978 and was Director-general between 1978 and 1991. He was the Advisory President of the International Council on Monuments and Sites (ICOMOS) from 1981 to 1990 and ICOMOS Norway President 1978–1992.

== Early life ==
Tschudi-Madsen was born in Bergen, Norway. He graduated in 1950 from the University of Oslo with a thesis in art history on Romantic architecture. In 1952–1953 he worked as a British Council scholar in London. Tschudi-Madsen received his Ph.D. in 1956.

== Career ==
Tschudi-Madsen worked as an antiquarian at the Directorate for Cultural Heritage in Norway from 1959. He was active for the preservation of Norwegian wooden buildings during the European Architectural Heritage Year campaign that was organized in 1975. He was also one of the pioneers of rediscovering the qualities of the compact Art Nouveau townscape of Ålesund, Norway. He was engaged in international cultural heritage through the association ICOMOS where he held a central position, and through UNESCOs work with World Heritage Sites. Under his leadership Urnes stave church and Bryggen in Bergen were listed in 1979. For a period he was also vice president of the UNESCO World Heritage Committee.

Tschudi-Madsen had a large academic production. He was adviser for the restoration of the Royal Palace, Oslo, Supreme Court of Norway and Den Nationale Scene in Bergen. For a long period he was the president of Friends of Akershus Fortress. He was a supporter for establishing an Art Nouveau Interpretation centre, Jugendstilsenteret in Ålesund, Norway. Between 1999 and 2003 he also worked as adviser for Jugendstilsenteret.

== Honors ==
Tschudi-Madsen was member of the Norwegian Academy of Science and Letters (1965) and Honorary Member of the Society for the Preservation of Ancient Norwegian Monuments (1983) and Honorary Member of ICOMOS (1992). He was Knight, First Class, of the Royal Norwegian Order of St. Olav (1983), Commander of the Dutch Order of Oranje-Nassau (1986), Knight of the Belgian Order of Leopold II (1992) and Commander of the Royal Norwegian Order of St. Olav (1996).

== Selected bibliography ==
- The Art Nouveau style, 2002 ISBN 0-486-41794-8
- The British ambassador's residence in Oslo 2001 ISBN 82-995965-0-5
- Norway and Conservation Aspect. Vern og Virke 1983, Oslo 1984
- Principles in Practice. Reflecting on Conservation of Wooden Architecture. ICOMOS Information, Napoli, Paris 1984
- Henrik Bull cop.1983
- Restoration and anti-restoration. (2. ed.) Oslo 1981
- Introduction. Luce Hinsch: ICOMOS 1965–1980. Oslo 1980
- Ansprache des Norwegischen Reichantiquars Stephan Tschudi-Madsen. Verleihung des Europa-Preises und der Europa-Goldmedaille für Denkmalpflege, Hamburg 1979
- Akershus Schloss. Le Château d'Akershus. Oslo 1977
- Sources of Art Nouveau, New York 1976
- Restoration and anti-restoration. A Study in English Restoration Philosophy, Oslo 1976 (2. ed. 1981)
- Art Nouveau – byen Ålesund. Arkitektens drøm igår – hans dilemma idag, Byggekunst nr. 114-15 Oslo 1975
- Beite, Kåre, Jugendstilen 1974
- "Neo-Art Nouveau and psychedelic art". Bulletin du 22. Congés International d'Histoire l'Art, 1969. Budapest 1972
- Hauglid, Roar – Report to the Council of Europe on Action relating to the Preservation and Rehabilitation of immovable cultural property, 1970
- Art Nouveau, Tokyo 1970
- El simbolismo del Art Nouveau. Cuadernos summanueva vision, Buenos Aires 1969
- Horta. Los trabajos y el estilo de Victor Horta antes 1900. Cusadernos summanueva vision, Buenos Aires 1969
- Art Nouveau. Cauder nos summanueva, Buenos Aires 1969
- "Akershus Castle. Unconquered Fortress", The Norseman 1968
- Il simbolismo dell'Art Nouveau. Edilizia Moderna, Milano 1965
- The works of Alexis de Chateauneuf in London and Oslo 1965
- "Rosendal. Norwegian Manor House with Scottish Connections". The Connoisseur, February 1960
- Morris and Munthe
- "Federico Barocci's "Noli me tangere" and two cartoons". The Burlington Magazine, Vol. CI 1959
- An introduction to Edvard Munch's wall paintings in the Oslo University, Aula 1959
- Sources of Art Nouveau, Oslo 1956. N.Y. 1957 (2. ed. N.Y. 1975)
- Horta. Works and Style before 1900, 1955
- "Some recently discovered Drawings by Rubens. The Burlington Magazine, Vol. XCV, September 1953
- Victoriansk dekorativ kunst 1837–1901, 1952
- Romantikkens arkitektur, 1949

== Other sources ==
- Bjerkek, Ole Petter : Stephan Tschudi-Madsen. Biografi, tillitsverv og bibliografi, Oslo 2007
- Lunde, Øivind (et al.) : Honnør til en hånet stil – Festskrift til Stephan Tschudi-Madsen på 70-årsdagen. Aschehoug forlag, Oslo 1999

Preceded by Roar Hauglid	Director of the Norwegian Directorate for Cultural Heritage; 1978–1991	Succeeded by Øivind Lunde
