= Rune Gjeldnes =

Norwegian adventurer (born 1971)

- Born: 20 May 1971 (age 55); Surnadal, Norway
- Military career
- Allegiance: Norway
- Service years: ?–1997, 1999–2000
- Unit: Marinejegerkommandoen
- Other work: Extreme adventures

Rune Gjeldnes (born 20 May 1971 in Surnadal Municipality) is a Norwegian adventurer. He completed his military education in 1992, when he met fellow adventurer-to-be Torry Larsen, also of Møre og Romsdal. Gjeldnes served in the Norwegian Naval Special Operations Command until 1997.

== Expeditions ==
Together with Torry Larsen, Rune Gjeldnes travelled across Greenland in 1996. In 1997, he planned and completed the "Arctic Ocean 2000" expedition—a 109-day, 2,100-kilometer trip—becoming the first to cross the Arctic Ocean without resupplies. In 1998, Gjeldnes and Bjørn Loe became the first to paddle the Rio Merevari in Venezuela. Gjeldnes participated in North Pole expeditions in 1997 and 1998, crossed Baffin Island in northern Canada in 1998, and later the same year climbed Mt Aconcagua (6,959 m (22,831 ft)). From 1999 to 2000, he again worked for the Royal Norwegian Navy (RNoN).

=== The Longest March ===
In February 2006, Rune Gjeldnes completed "The Longest March", a three-month 4,800-kilometre (3,000 mi) solo ski trek across the South Pole region, becoming the first person to cross that area alone without being resupplied. His route went from Queen Maud Land, over the Pole, and on to Terra Nova Bay. The final couple of weeks of the journey had to be made on foot, as Gjeldnes had lost one of his mountain skis off his sled, this before having to descend a glacier of 2,000 m (6,600 ft) ASL in order to reach his destination. The distance is the equivalent of the distance between New York City and San Francisco by road across the United States. The expedition had a scientific element as Gjeldnes took regular blood samples of himself to be used in studies of the human immune system under extreme conditions.

He now holds the records of the longest ski journey without being resupplied and the longest ski journey generally. He is the only person to ski across the North Pole, the South Pole and Greenland without resupply.
