= Sigvart Høgh-Nilsen =

Norwegian pianist and composer

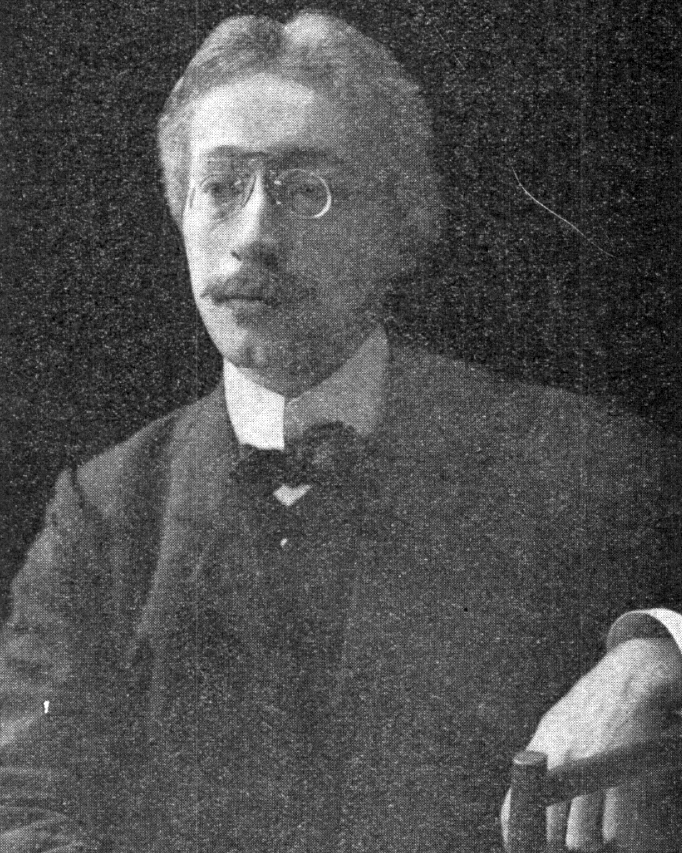
Sigvart Høgh-Nilsen

Sigvart Høgh-Nilsen (29 April 1880 – 1919) was a Norwegian pianist and composer.

== Biography ==
He was born on 29 April 1880 in Ålesund, Norway to Captain Sigvart Nilsen (1852–1906) and Sophie Marie Olesdatter (1853–1924). After his birth, the family moved to Bergen, Norway. His mother was the daughter of Ole Mathias Pedersen (1822–1914). He studied music in Berlin.

== Concerts ==
- Franz Liszt, Ballade in B minor for piano (January 26, 1904)
- Franz Liszt, Ballade in B minor for piano (April 15, 1904)
- Johannes Brahms, Rhapsody in B minor for piano, Op. 70 (1906)
- Richard Wagner, Träume, with Anna Jensen (1906)
- Franz Liszt, Franciskus Legend (1906)

== Compositions ==
- 2 Deutsche Lieder nr. 1 Ich hab' im Traum geweinet Heine (1906)
