= Maja Refsum =

Norwegian sculptor and teacher

Maja Refsum (23 September 1897 – 11 January 1986) was a Norwegian sculptor and teacher.

She grew up in Kristiania (now Oslo), Norway. She was the daughter of Harald Refsum (1866-1950) and Hanna Ovidia Yssen (1863-1944). She was the aunt of Sigrid Christie (1923-2004), who was married to noted antiquarian Håkon Christie. She was married to art historian and head of Norwegian Directorate for Cultural Heritage Arne Nygård-Nilssen. Their daughter Kirsti (1935-) married Carsten Hopstock.

At the State Crafts and Art Industry School (1917–19) she had Lars Utne as a supervisor. She furthered her education at the art academy in Kristiania with Gunnar Utsond (1919–20) and at Bauhaus University in Weimar under Richard Engelmann, director of the Sculpture School (1921-22).

She is represented in the National Gallery of Norway with the terracotta sculpture Bruden pyntes. Among her most important works is her sculpture of writer Amalie Skram situated at Nordnes in Bergen, Norway.
