= Erik Rolfsen =

Norwegian architect (1905–1992)

Erik Rolfsen (24 July 1905 – 27 September 1992) was a Norwegian architect. He served as urban manager of Oslo, Norway from 1947 to 1973.

== Biography ==
Erik Rolfsen was born at Ålesund in More og Romsdal, Norway. Rolfsen took his final exams at Kristiansund Public School in 1924. He attended the Drawing Academy in Paris during 1926. In 1930 he took his final exam in architecture at the Norwegian Institute of Technology in Trondheim. While studying in Trondheim he was also a member of Mot Dag.

He worked in Kristiansund from 1940, but from 1942 to 1945 he was a consultant for the Norwegian government-in-exile in London. From 1947 to 1973 he was the director of city planning in Oslo and put their mark on the city during a period of intense development. After the merger of Oslo Municipality and Aker Municipality in 1948, Rolfsen prepared a general plan for the new large municipal area. The plan was to connect residential areas and laid the foundation for post-war housing in Oslo. Rolfsen favored a strong future-oriented regional plan, where residential areas, workplaces and education centers were coordinated to reduce travel distances. Central to his urban planning was the preservation of nature as an essential part of the city.

Rolfsen was an architect at the Norwegian Cooperative Association of Architects in 1932–38. He was a guest lecturer at the Norwegian Institute of Technology in 1947 and lecturer in architecture courses at the National Craft and Industrial Art School 1947–49. He was chairman of the Oslo architect Association 1948–49. Rolfsen was a member of the Norwegian Labour Party and served in a variety of public committees and advice on urban issues. He presided over the International Federation for Housing and Planning from 1954 to 1958.

== Other sources ==
- Erik Rolfsen (1975) Underveis i Oslo (Oslo: Aschehoug) ISBN 978-8203080159
