= Arne Nygård-Nilssen =

Norwegian art historian

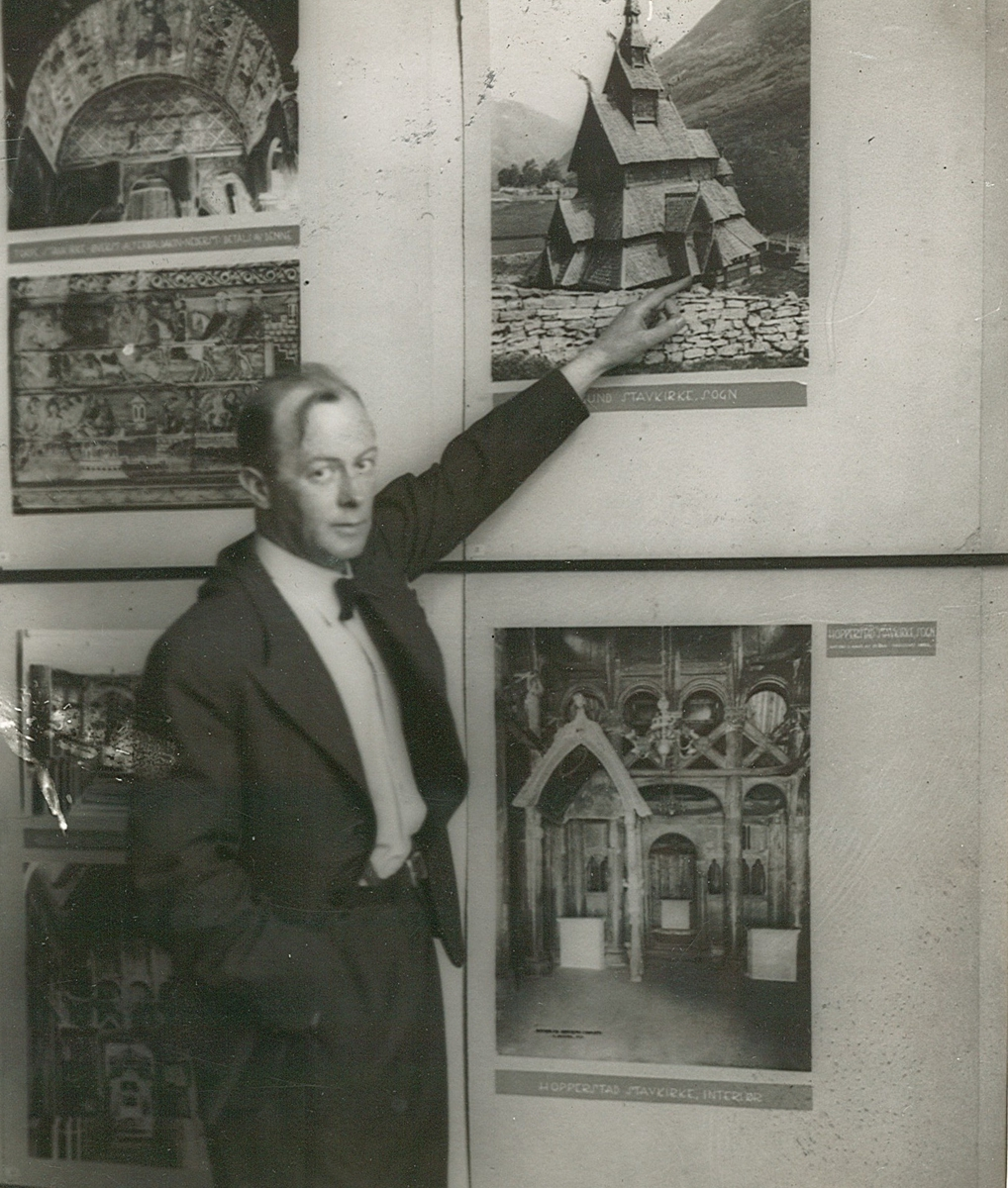
Arne Nygård-Nilssen - ca. 1950 - Oslo Museum - OB.F06279a.

Arne Nygård-Nilssen (5 April 1899 – 26 July 1958) was a Norwegian art historian, publicist and magazine editor.

== Biography ==
Nygård-Nilssen grew up in Bergen, Norway where his father was a school teacher. He attended the University of Oslo (MS. 1927, PhD. 1945). At the University he came under the influence of Anders Bugge (1889-1955), a prominent professor of art history. Professor Bugge was curator at the Norwegian Museum of Decorative Arts and Design in Oslo and served with the Society for the Preservation of Ancient Norwegian Monuments. Nygård-Nilssen subsequently took over Bugge's work with historic Norwegian churches, with a focus on conservation and restoration.

Nygård-Nilssen was secretary of The Society for the Preservation of Ancient Norwegian Monuments from 1929 to 1946. He replaced Harry Fett as head the Norwegian Directorate for Cultural Heritage serving from 1946 to 1958. Arne Nygård-Nilssen also edited the magazine Kunst og Kultur, and a series of scientific books.

He was married to sculptor Maja Refsum. Their daughter Kirsti married Carsten Hopstock.

== Other sources ==
- Nygård-Nilssen, Arne; Bugge, Anders; Kielland, Thor; Shetelig, Haakon (eds.) (1945) Norsk Kunstforskning I Det Tyvende Århundre. Festskrift til Harry Fett (Cammermeyer Boghandel)

Preceded by Harry Fett	Director of the Norwegian Directorate for Cultural Heritage; 1946–1958	Succeeded by Roar Hauglid
