= Torry Larsen =

Norwegian adventurer and Arctic explorer (born 1971)

Torry Larsen (born 11 April 1971 in Ålesund) is a Norwegian adventurer and Arctic explorer.

In 1992 he met fellow adventurer-to-be Rune Gjeldnes, also of Møre og Romsdal. Both Gjeldnes and Larsen served in the Norwegian Naval Special Operations Command.

Together with Gjeldnes, Torry Larsen travelled across Greenland in 1996–2500 km in 79 days—unsupported by helicopters. In 2000, they completed the "Arctic Ocean 2000" expedition—a 109-day, 2,100 kilometer trip that started in Siberia, crossing the North Pole and reaching Canada. They became the first to cross the Arctic Ocean without resupply.

== Source / External links ==
- His Website (norw. and engl.)
