= Roar Hauglid =

Roar Hauglid (26 December 1910 – 18 November 2001) was a Norwegian art historian, antiquarian and publicist.

== Biography ==
Hauglid was born in Kristiania, now Oslo, Norway in 1910. He was the son of Kristian Hauglid (1864–1927) and Hedvig Hansen (1871–1946). He attended Oslo Cathedral School and the University of Oslo and received his magister degree in 1937 and doctorate in 1950.

He worked as an antiquarian and wrote several books on Norwegian cultural history, most notably stave churches. He replaced Arne Nygård-Nilssen as head of the Norwegian Directorate for Cultural Heritage, serving from 1958 to 1977. He was decorated Knight, First Class of the Order of St. Olav, and Commander of the Order of the Polar Star.

== Selected works ==
- Norway: A Thousand Years of Native Arts and Crafts (1959)
- Native Art of Norway (1967)
- Norwegian Stave Churches (1977)

Preceded by Arne Nygård-Nilssen	Director of the Norwegian Directorate for Cultural Heritage; 1958–1977	Succeeded by Stephan Tschudi-Madsen
