= Norwegian Pharmacy Museum =

Museum in Oslo, Norway

Coordinates: 59°54′22.07″N 10°41′12.73″E

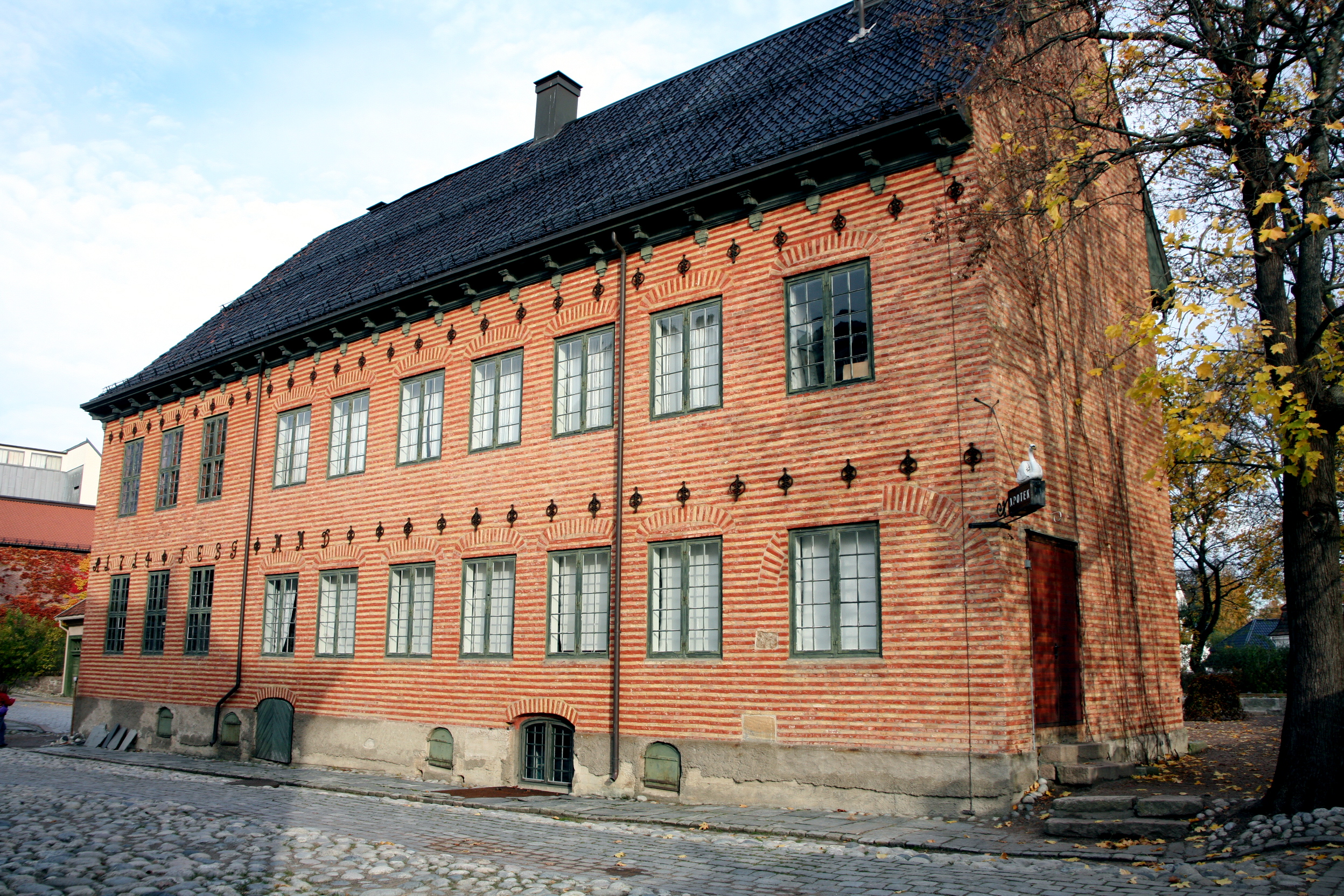
The Norwegian Pharmacy Museum

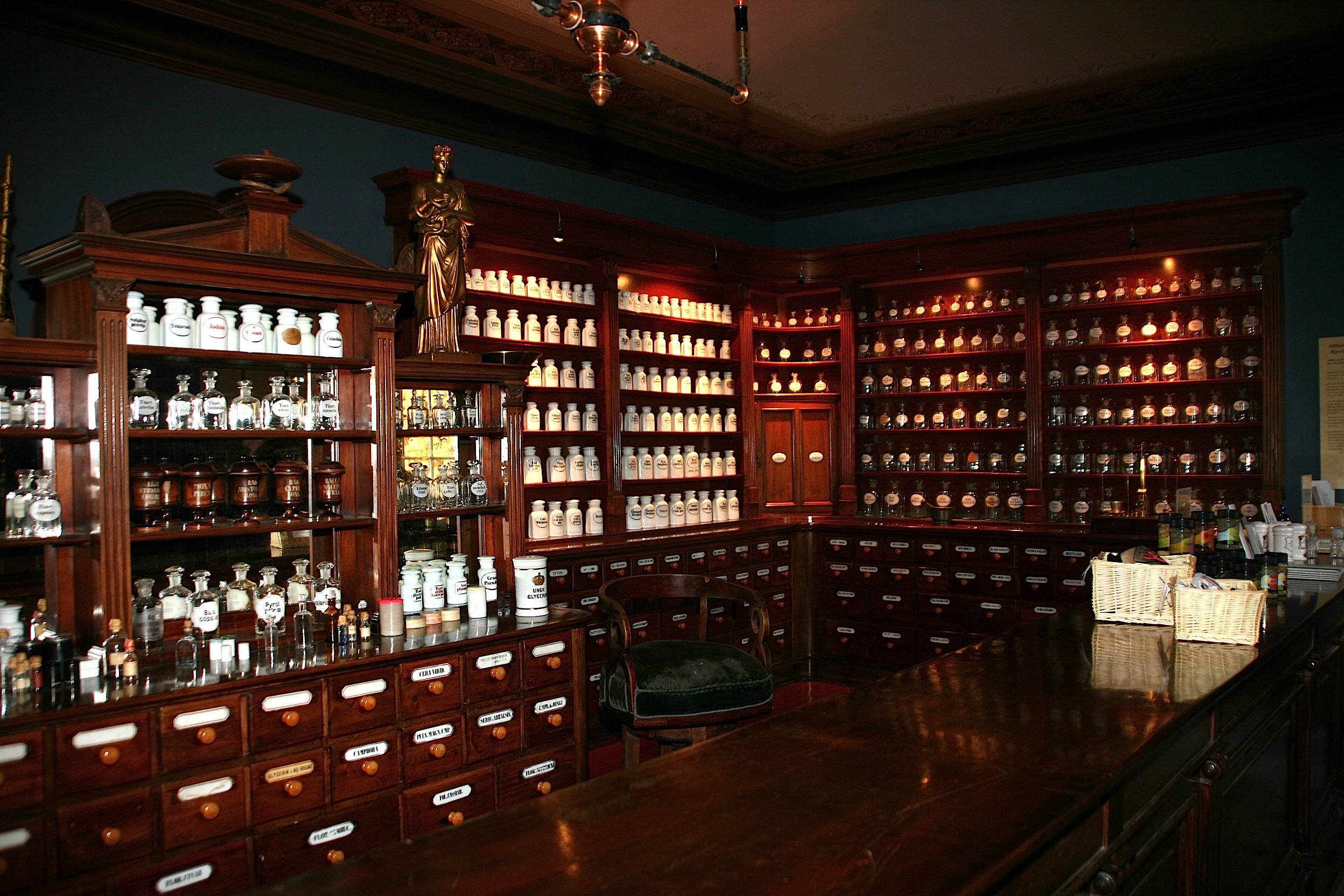
Interior formerly from Apoteket Hjorten in Oslo, now at the Norwegian Pharmacy Museum.

The Norwegian Pharmacy Museum (Norsk Farmasihistorisk Museum) is located on Bygdøy in Oslo, Norway. It is operated in cooperation with the Norwegian Museum of Cultural History.

The Norwegian Pharmacy Museum was established in 1963 and opened in 1974. The purpose of the museum is to preserve pharmaceutical history. It exhibits items, inventory and literature collected from throughout Norway. The collection holds more than 19,000 items.

The pharmacy museum is housed in a former private residence (Generalitetsgården) from Christiania dating to 1714. The house was demolished in 1918 and subsequently rebuilt at the Norwegian Folk Museum at Bygdøy. While the corner rooms in the first and second floor have been preserved from the original building, a public area from Apoteket Hjorten in Oslo has also been reconstructed in the building, illustrating an urban pharmacy from the 1860s.

In 1982, a herbal garden was added to the museum, showcasing about 160 different herbs, trees and shrubs used in the preparation of traditional remedies or mentioned in Old Norse myths and legends.
