= Ålesund =

- Town/City
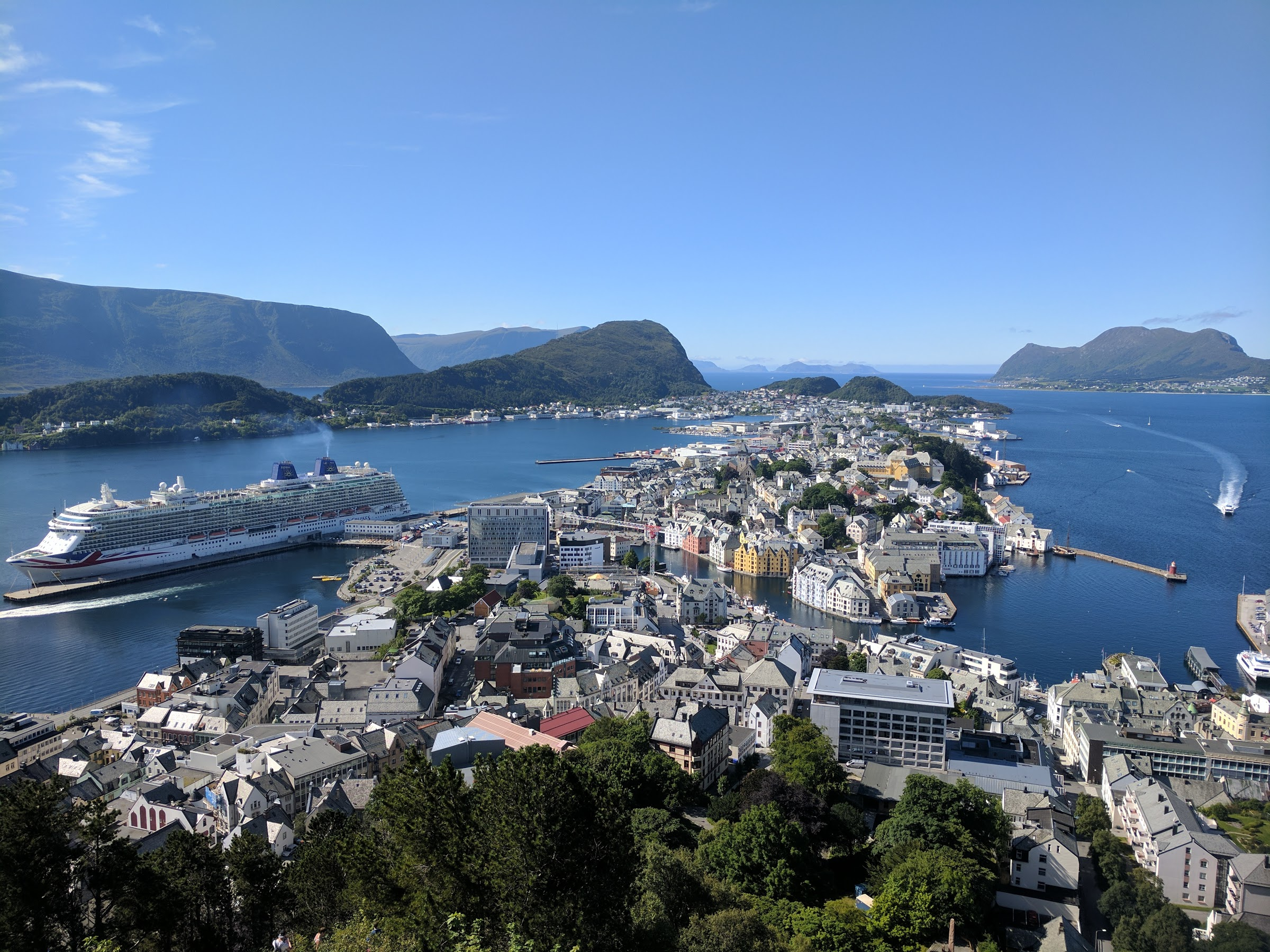
- View of the town, 2017

- Coat of arms
- Interactive map of Ålesund
- Location within Møre og Romsdal Location within Norway
- Coordinates: 62.47226°N 6.1549°E
- Country: Norway
- Region: Western Norway
- County: Møre og Romsdal
- District: Sunnmøre
- Municipality: Ålesund Municipality
- Established as
- Ladested: 1824
- Kjøpstad: 1848

Area
  - Total: 28.93 km^{2} (11.17 sq mi)
- Elevation: 20 m (66 ft)

Population (2024)
  - Total: 55,684
  - Density: 1,925/km^{2} (4,990/sq mi)
- Demonyms: Ålesundar; Ålesunder; Ålesunding
- Time zone: UTC+01:00 (CET)
  - Summer (DST): UTC+02:00 (CEST)
- Post Code: 6000 Ålesund

Ålesund (Norwegian pronunciation: [ˈôːɫəsʉn]) is a town in Møre og Romsdal county, Norway. The town is the administrative centre of Ålesund Municipality. The centre of the town of Ålesund lies on the islands of Hessa, Aspøya, and Nørve with newer developments located on the islands of Uksenøya the outer parts of the "urban area" even stretch onto the island of Sula which is in the neighboring Sula Municipality.

The town is the main headquarters for the Norwegian Coastal Administration as well as one location of the Møre og Romsdal District Court.

In Norwegian, Ålesund is considered to be a by which can be translated as a town or a city. Ålesund is the ninth largest town/city in Norway. The town has become more of an urban agglomeration during the late part of the 20th century and the urban area has spread out and into the neighboring Sula Municipality. The 28.93-square-kilometre (7,150-acre) town has a population (2024) of 55,684 and a population density of 1,925 inhabitants per square kilometre (4,990/sq mi). About 21.75 square kilometres (8.40 sq mi) of the town with a population of 46,554 lies in Ålesund Municipality and the remaining 7.19 square kilometres (2.78 sq mi) of the town with a population of 9,130 lies in Sula Municipality.

The town has an unusually consistent architecture, most of the buildings having been built between 1904 and 1907. Jugendstilsenteret is a national interpretation centre, visitors can learn more about the town fire, the rebuilding of the town and the Art Nouveau style. Ålesund is a partner in the Art nouveau network, a European network of co-operation created in 1999 for the study, safeguards and development of the Art nouveau.

The term "Little London" was often applied to the community during the occupation of Norway by Nazi Germany due to the Norwegian resistance work that took place here. Among other things, the city was central to the flights to Scotland and England.

== History ==
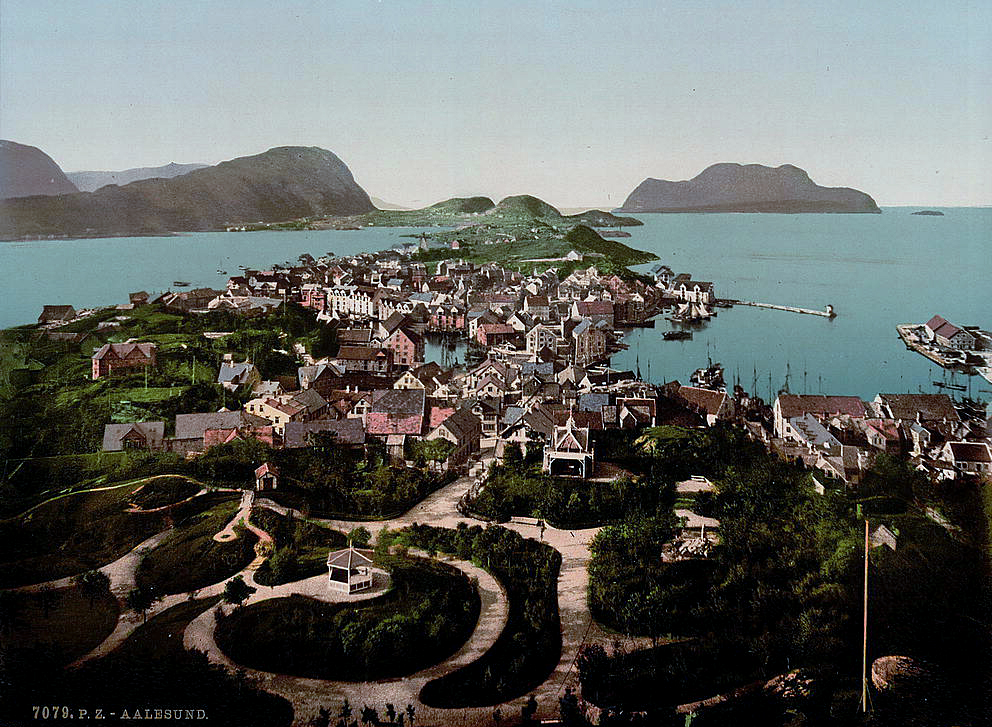
Ålesund, Norway, ca. 1895, before the fire

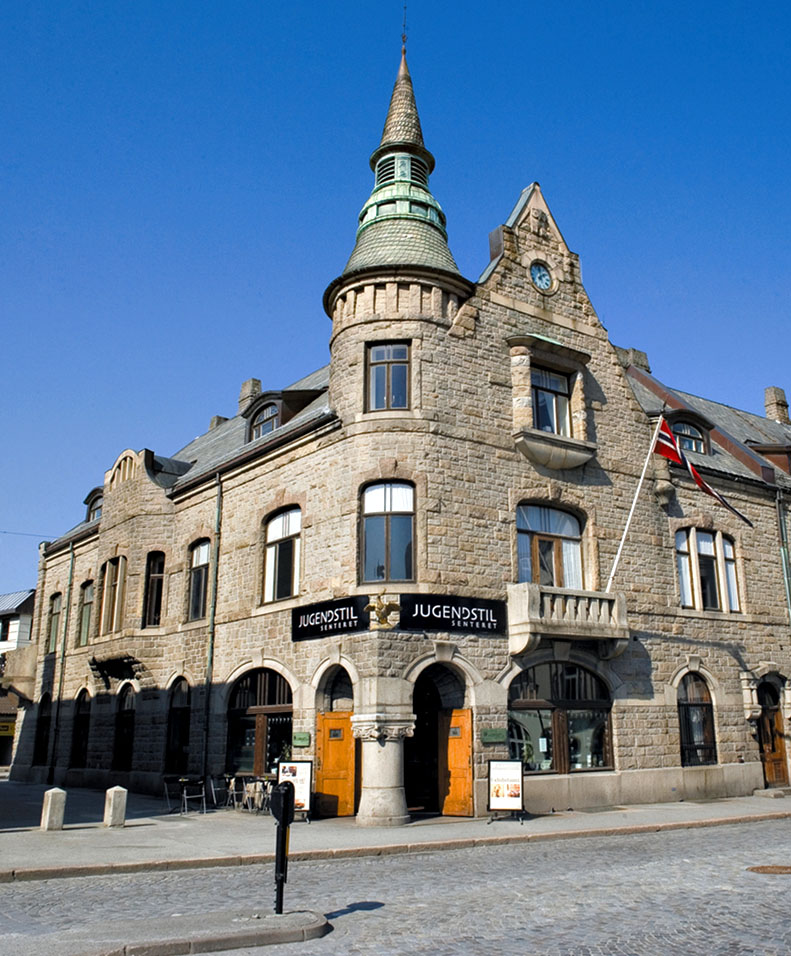
Jugendstilsenteret – The Art Nouveau Centre of Norway

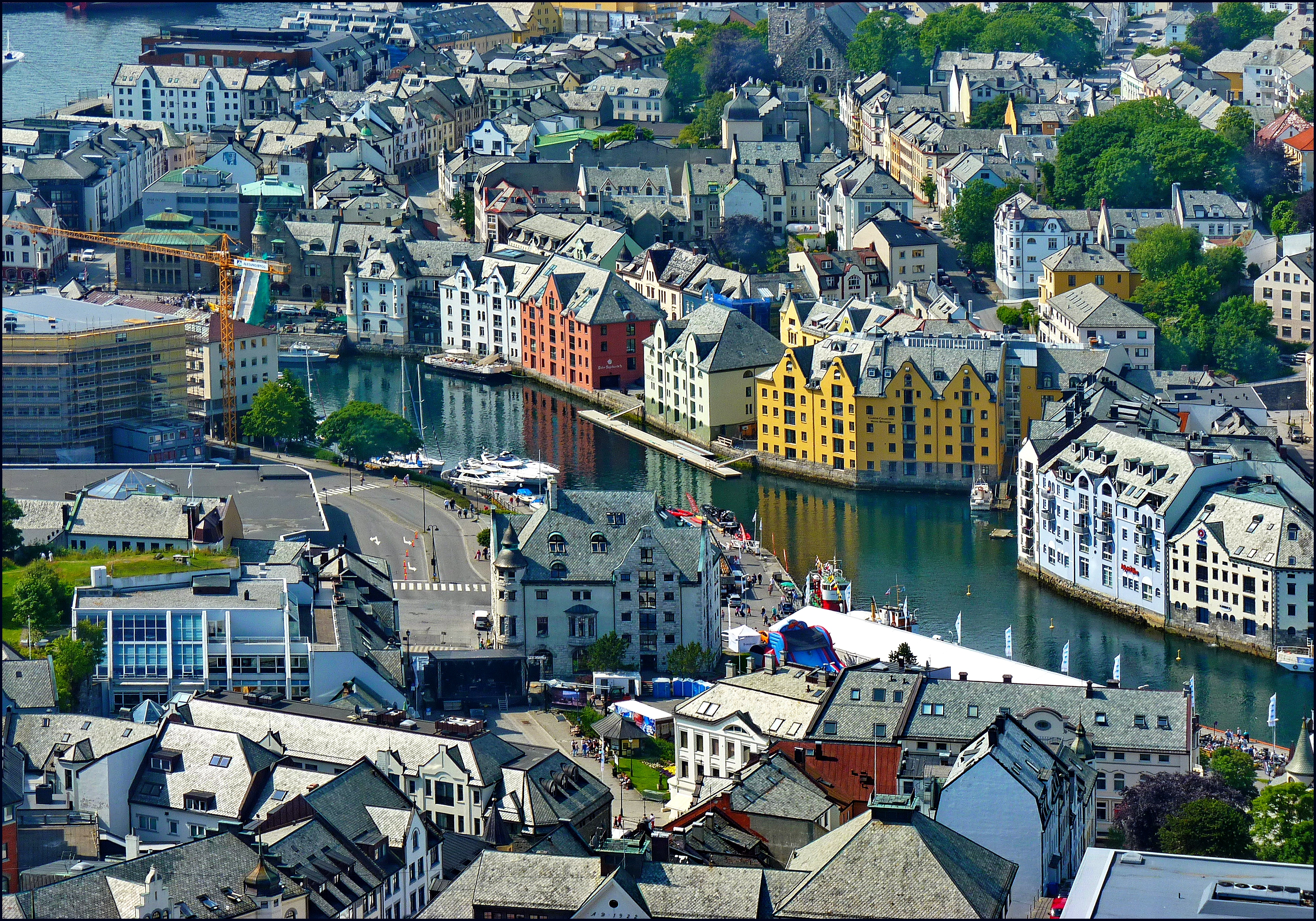
Ålesund, 2014

Legend has it that Gangerolf (outside of Norway better known as Rollo), the 10th-century founder of the dynasty of the dukes of Normandy, hailed from the island of Giske, north-west of the present-day town of Ålesund. At least three statues of Rolle exist: in the town park in Ålesund, in the city of Rouen, France, and in Fargo, North Dakota, United States.

The old prestegjeld of Borgund included all of what is now Ålesund. In 1793, the port of Aalesund was granted limited ladested rights. Later, in 1824, it was granted full ladested rights. In 1835, Ålesund had 482 inhabitants. On 1 January 1838, the new formannskapsdistrikt law went into effect, granting limited local self-government to all parishes in Norway. Therefore, on that date, the small ladested of Aalesund became a small municipality with its own municipal council. It was surrounded by the large rural Borgund Municipality. In 1848, it was upgraded to the status of a kjøpstad, a more important market town.

On 1 January 1875, part of Borgund Municipality (population: 902) was transferred to the town of Ålesund. By 1900, the population had increased to 11,777.

In the night of 23 January 1904, the town was the scene of the Ålesund Fire, one of the most terrible of the many conflagrations to which Norwegian towns, once built largely of wood, have been subjected. Practically the entire town was destroyed during the night, a gale aiding the flames, and the population had to leave the town in the middle of the night with only a few minutes' notice. Only one person died in the fire, the 76-year-old Ane Heen, but more than 10,000 people were left without shelter.

Kaiser Wilhelm of Germany had often been on vacation to Sunnmøre. After the fire, he sent four warships with materials to build temporary shelters and barracks. After a period of planning, the town was rebuilt in stone, brick, and mortar in Jugendstil (Art Nouveau), the architectural style of the time. The structures were designed by approximately 20 master builders and 30 Norwegian architects, most of them educated in Trondheim and Charlottenburg, Berlin, drawing inspiration from all over Europe. To honor Wilhelm, one of the most frequented streets of the town is named after him.

In 1922, another part of Borgund Municipality (population: 1,148) was transferred to the town of Ålesund. During the 1960s, there were many municipal mergers across Norway due to the work of the Schei Committee. On 1 January 1968, most of the neighbouring Borgund Municipality (population: 20,132) was merged with the town of Ålesund forming the new Ålesund Municipality. This merger more than doubled the population of Ålesund, for a new total population of 38,589 and the land area of the municipality was vastly larger. The town of Ålesund was the administrative centre of the large municipality. After the merger, the town no longer had its own council and was no longer self-governing, with the new municipal council representing the whole municipality. On 1 January 1977, the island of Sula and some small surrounding islets (population: 6,302) were separated from Ålesund to form the new Sula Municipality. The southern part of the town of Ålesund was located on Sula, therefore the town's urban area overlaps two municipalities.

=== Name ===
A part of the town was historically known as Kaupangen Borgund. The Old Norse word kaupang means "marketplace" or "town", thus the market town for Borgund. The Old Norse form of the current name was Álasund. The first element of that (probably) is the plural genitive case of áll which means "eel" and the last element is sund which means "strait" or "sound". Before 1921, the name was written Aalesund.

== Culture ==
The Norwegian Centre of Art Nouveau Architecture, Jugendstilsenteret, is situated in Ålesund. It is a museum and interpretive center with exhibitions telling the story of the town fire and Art Nouveu/Jugendstil in Norway and Europe.

Sunnmøre museum, founded in 1931, is an outdoor folk museum devoted to the Norwegian coastal culture and way of life. Located on an area of 120 hectares (300 acres), it has more than 55 old and distinct houses from the past 300 years moved to the site, replicas of old Viking ships, and the Medieval Age Museum with artifacts from excavations of the old trading centre.

The local newspaper is Sunnmørsposten, founded in 1882 and published six days a week. Ålesund is the site of the annual Norwegian Food Festival.

== Education ==
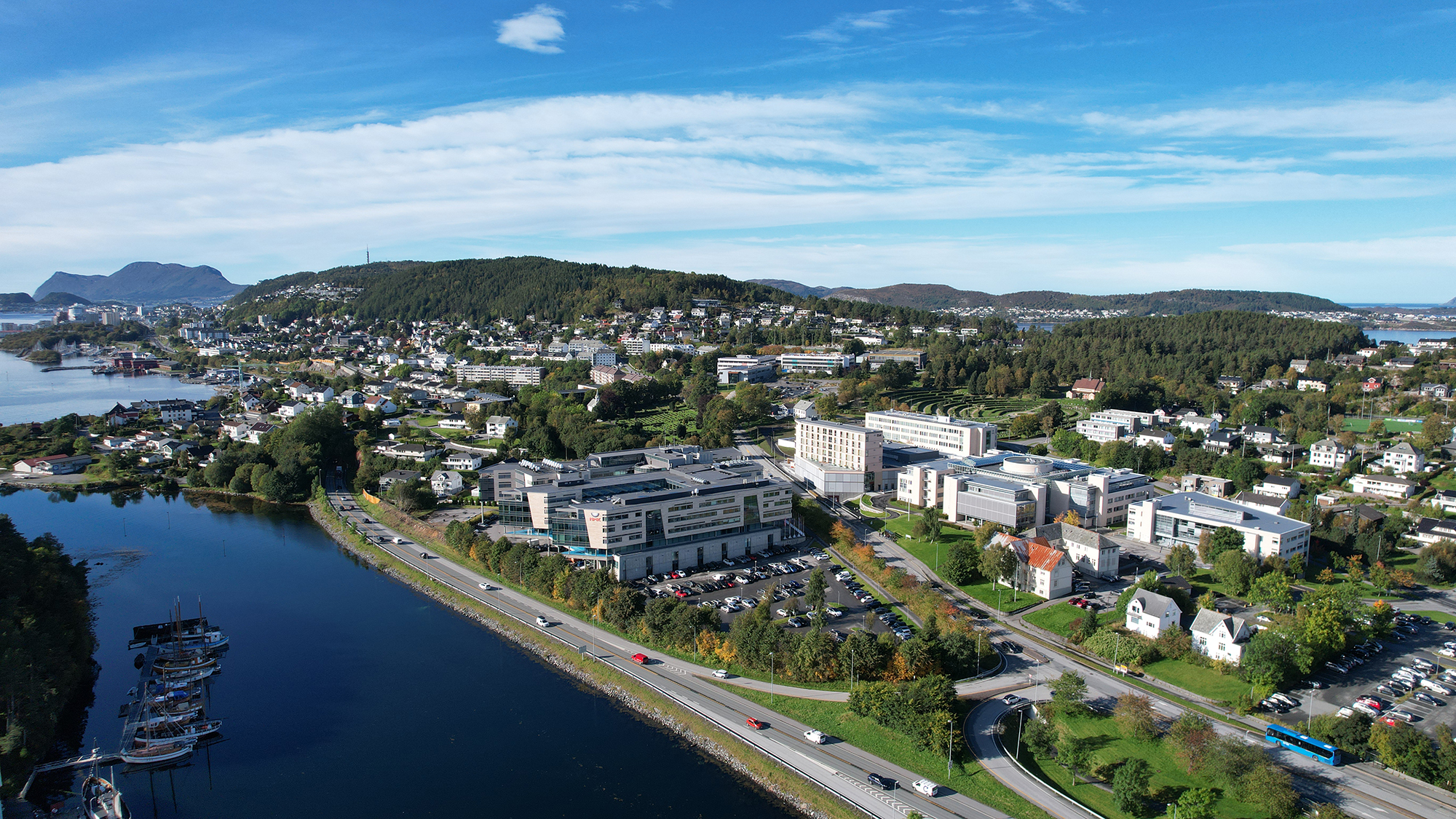
View of Campus and the University in Aalesund, 2024

Ålesund is home to a sub-division of the Norwegian University of Science and Technology (NTNU), with approximately 1,800 students and 150 employees. The Ålesund School of Art (Norwegian: Ålesund Kunstskole) is a school for visual arts located in Ålesund.

Ålesund videregående skole, also known as Latinskolen, formerly Aalesund Lærd- og Realskole, is the oldest secondary school in Ålesund, having been established in 1863. Of the six upper secondary schools in Ålesund, including Latinskolen, Fagerlia videregående skole is the largest with room for approximately 1,000 students.

Ålesund also features an International school for children aged 5–15.

== Transportation ==
=== Sea ===
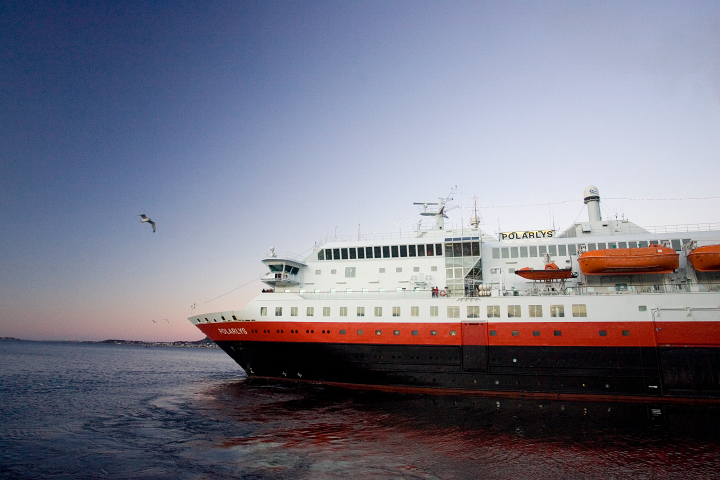
MS Polarlys in Ålesund (December 2005)

Ålesund is a port of call for passenger and freight vessels travelling between Bergen, Kingston upon Hull, Newcastle, Hamburg, and Trondheim, including the Hurtigruta (Norwegian Coastal Express) cruise ships, which arrive in Ålesund twice a day.

In 2022 they added the large power connections that allow ships to turn off their engines whilst docked.

=== Air ===
The town's airport, Ålesund Airport, Vigra, has several daily flights to/from Oslo, Bergen, Trondheim, and Copenhagen. In November 2012 KLM announced it would fly to Ålesund 5 days a week from Amsterdam starting in April 2013.

=== Bus ===
There are 18 local bus lines (including one night bus line) and 9 express bus lines operated by FRAM and Skyss going through the town.

== Sport ==
The local football team, Aalesunds FK (Aalesunds Fotballklubb), was founded in 1914. The team played in the Norwegian top flight for the first time in the 2003 season. The club won its first Norwegian Cup in 2009 and won again in 2011. They played their home matches at Kråmyra Stadium until the 2005 season, when they relocated to the new Color Line Stadium, located approximately 1 kilometre (0.62 mi) outside the town centre. AaFK's supporter club is called "Stormen" and has about 2,000 members.

== Climate ==
Ålesund has a temperate oceanic climate (Cfb in the Köppen classification), with windy, wet and mild winters, a small diurnal temperature variation and a large seasonal lag because of its proximity to the Norwegian sea. The winters in Ålesund are slightly drier than places close by on the mainland, such as Sykkylven, which experience more orographic precipiation from the surrounding mountains.

Climate data for Ålesund IV 1991–2020 (15 m)
Month	Jan	Feb	Mar	Apr	May	Jun	Jul	Aug	Sep	Oct	Nov	Dec	Year
Daily mean °C (°F)	3.2 (37.8)	2.6 (36.7)	3.8 (38.8)	6.3 (43.3)	9.2 (48.6)	12.1 (53.8)	14.5 (58.1)	14.8 (58.6)	12.3 (54.1)	8.3 (46.9)	5.7 (42.3)	3.5 (38.3)	8.0 (46.4)
Average precipitation mm (inches)	149.0 (5.87)	130.0 (5.12)	128.0 (5.04)	78.0 (3.07)	75.0 (2.95)	85.0 (3.35)	84.0 (3.31)	126.0 (4.96)	161.0 (6.34)	169.0 (6.65)	149.0 (5.87)	176.0 (6.93)	1,510 (59.46)
Source: yr.no

== Notable people ==
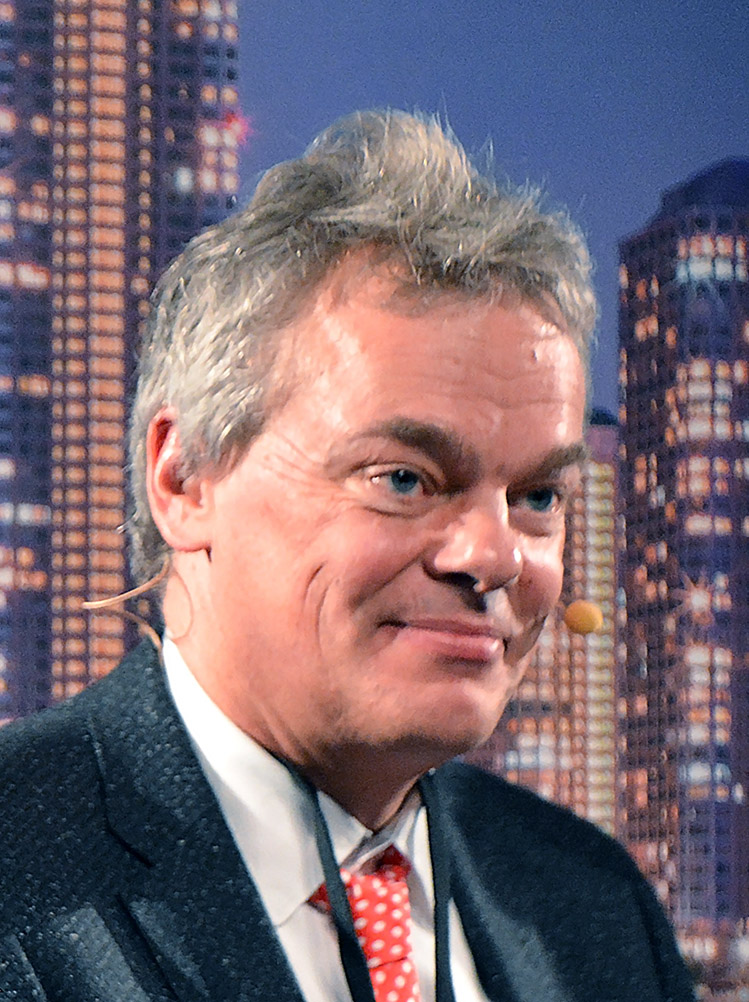
Edvard Moser, 2015

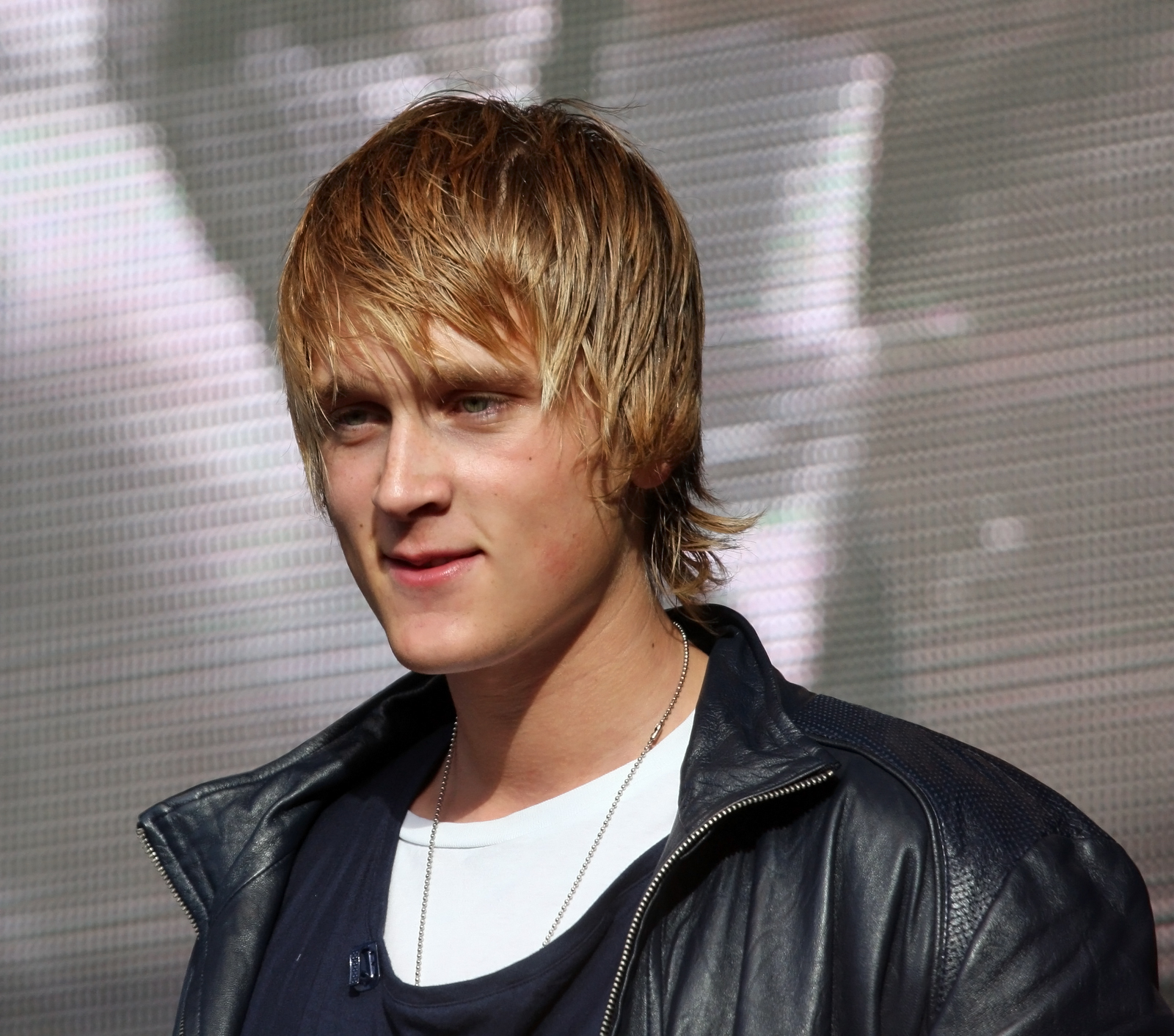
Bjørn Johan Muri, 2010

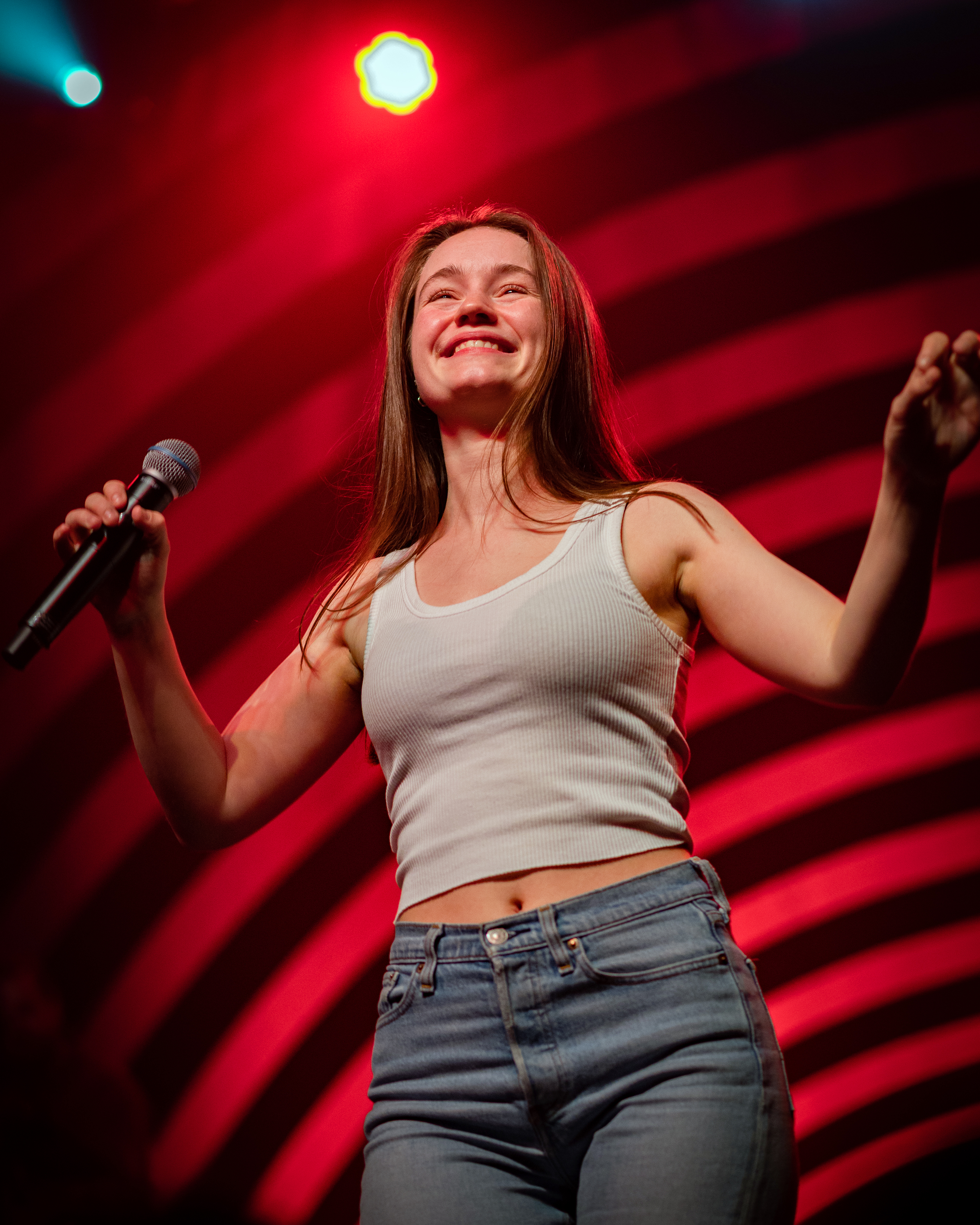
Sigrid Raabe, 2022

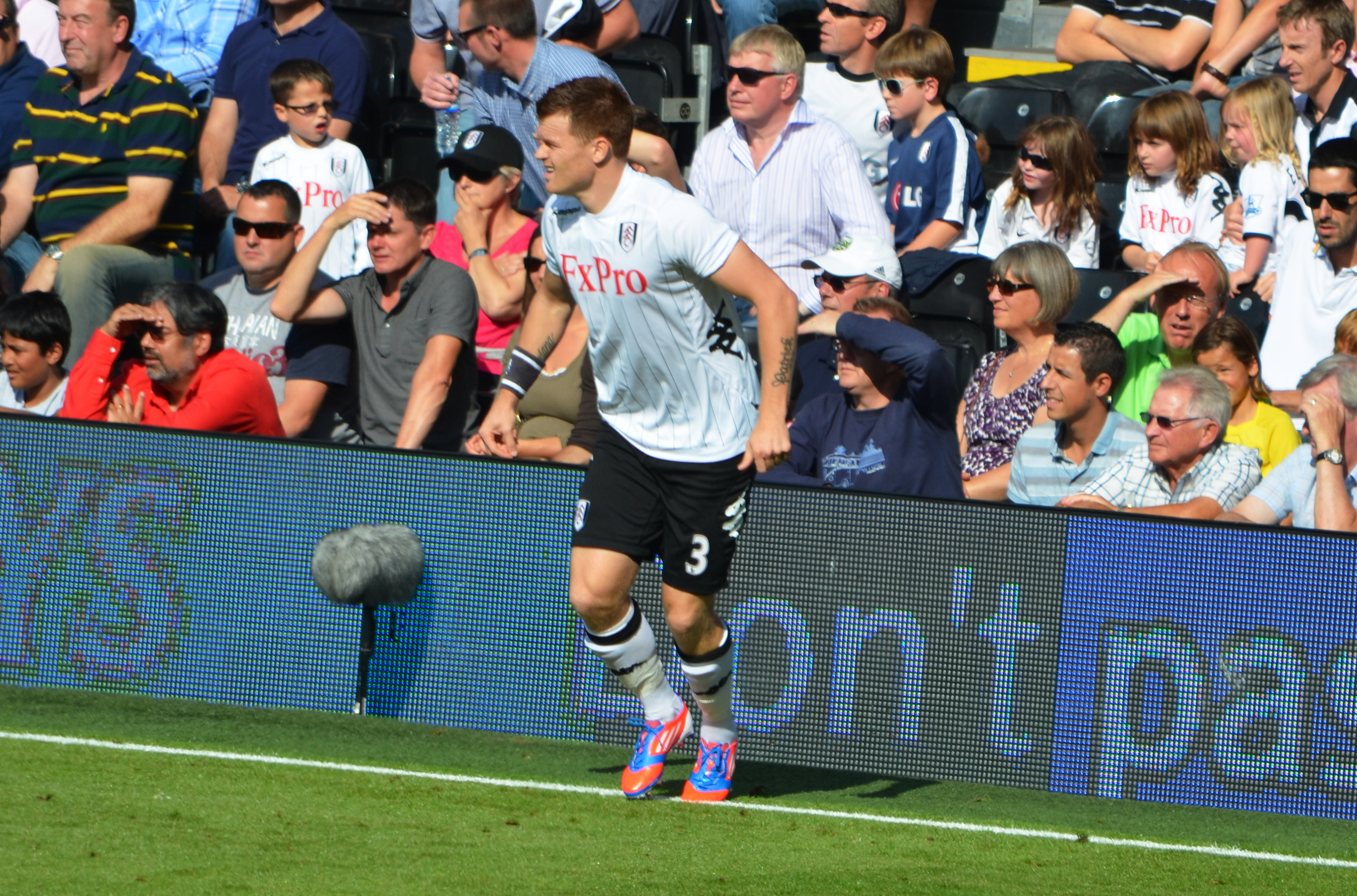
John Arne Riise, 2012

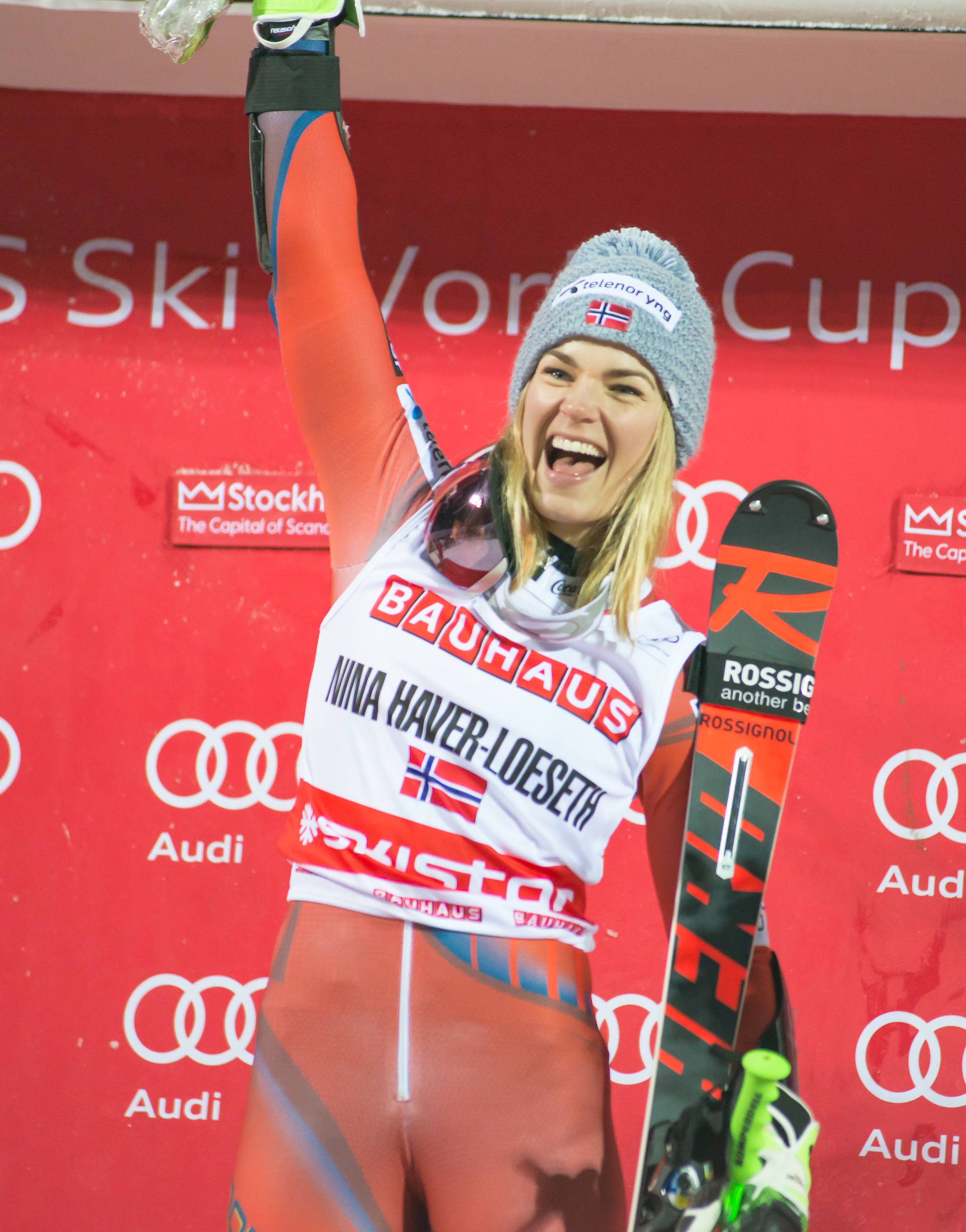
Nina Haver-Loeseth, 2018

=== Public Service & business ===
- Anton Ludvig Alvestad (1883–1956), the mayor of Ålesund, 1920–21 and government minister
- Reinert Torgeirson (1884–1969), a politician, poet, playwright and novelist
- Erik Rolfsen (1905–1992), an architect; urban manager of Oslo, 1947–1973
- Monrad Norderval (1902–1976), the Bishop of Nord-Hålogaland, 1961–1972
- Dagfinn Flem (1906–1976), a politician, Mayor of Ålesund, 1958 to 1965
- Margit Johnsen (1913–1987), a Norwegian merchant navy sailor; the only female recipient of the military award St. Olav's Medal with Oak Branch
- Joachim Rønneberg DSO (1919–2018), an Army officer, broadcaster and WWII Commando
- Helen Bjørnøy (born 1954), a Lutheran minister, politician and County Governor of Buskerud
- Odd Arne Westad FBA (born 1960), a historian specializing in the Cold War
- Edvard Moser (born 1962), a psychologist and neuroscientist, winner 2014 Nobel Prize
- Harald T. Nesvik (born 1966), a politician and member of the Storting since 1997
- Paal Kibsgaard (born 1967), a petroleum engineer; chairman and CEO of Schlumberger
- Peder Are Nøstvold Jensen (born 1975), q controversial counterjihad blogger known as Fjordman
- Torry Larsen (born 1971), a Norwegian adventurer and Arctic explorer
- Cecilie Skog (born 1974), a professional adventurer, guide and lecturer.
- Sylvi Listhaug (born 1977), a Norwegian politician and Govt. minister

=== The Arts ===
- Jacob Fjelde (1859–1896), an American sculptor of public monuments
- Ambrosia Tønnesen (1859–1948), the first professional female sculptor in Norway
- Sigvart Høgh-Nilsen (1880–1919), a Norwegian pianist and composer
- Axel Revold (1887–1962), a Norwegian painter, illustrator and academic
- Ole Barman (1897–1983), a novelist, short story writer, playwright and theatre director
- Hartvig Kiran (1911–1978), an author, journalist, songwriter and composer
- Arnold Eidslott (1926–2018), a poet laureate (1986 to 2018) and telegraphic engineer
- Harald Grytten (1938–2025), a philologist and historian
- Oddbjørn Blindheim (born 1944), a jazz pianist and dentist
- Geir Rönning (born 1962), a professional singer-songwriter
- Annbjørg Lien (born 1971), a Hardanger fiddler, nyckelharpist, and violinist
- Magne Hovden (born 1974), a writer, translator
- Hedvig Mollestad Thomassen (born 1982), a guitarist, vocalist and composer
- Ingrid Helene Håvik (born 1987), a songwriter and vocalist, lead singer of Highasakite
- Bjørn Johan Muri (born 1990), a Norwegian pop singer
- Sigrid Solbakk Raabe (born 1996) known as Sigrid, a singer and songwriter

=== Sport ===
- Knud Leonard Knudsen (1879–1954), a gymnast, team gold medallist, 1912 Summer Olympics
- Harald Stenvaag (born 1953), a rifle shooter, silver and bronze medallist at the 1992 and 2000 Summer Olympics
- Ann Kristin Aarønes (born 1973), a former footballer, 111 caps with Norway women
- Ingrid Tørlen (born 1979), a beach volleyball player, competed in the 2004 Summer Olympics
- John Arne Riise (born 1980), a former footballer with 546 club appearances and 110 caps for Norway
- Leni Larsen Kaurin (born 1981), a football midfielder, 98 caps for Norway women
- Bjørn Helge Riise (born 1983), a former footballer with 358 club appearances and 35 caps for Norway
- Olav Lundanes (born 1987), an orienteering competitor, ten times gold medallist at the World Orienteering Championships
- Nina Haver-Løseth (born 1989), a slalom ski racer, team bronze medallist, 2018 Winter Olympics
- Karoline Bjerkeli Grøvdal (born 1990), a long-distance runner; competed at the 2012 and 2016 Summer Olympics
- Sebastian Foss Solevåg (born 1991), an alpine ski racer, team bronze medallist, 2018 Winter Olympics
- Andrea Raaholt (born 1996), a Norwegian tennis player

== Twin towns – sister cities ==
Ålesund is twinned with:

- Akureyri, Iceland (1949)
- Borgo a Mozzano, Italy (1979)
- Lahti, Finland (1947)
- Peterhead, Scotland, United Kingdom (1967)
- Randers, Denmark (1947)
- Tacoma, United States (1986)
- Västerås, Sweden (1947)

== Gallery ==
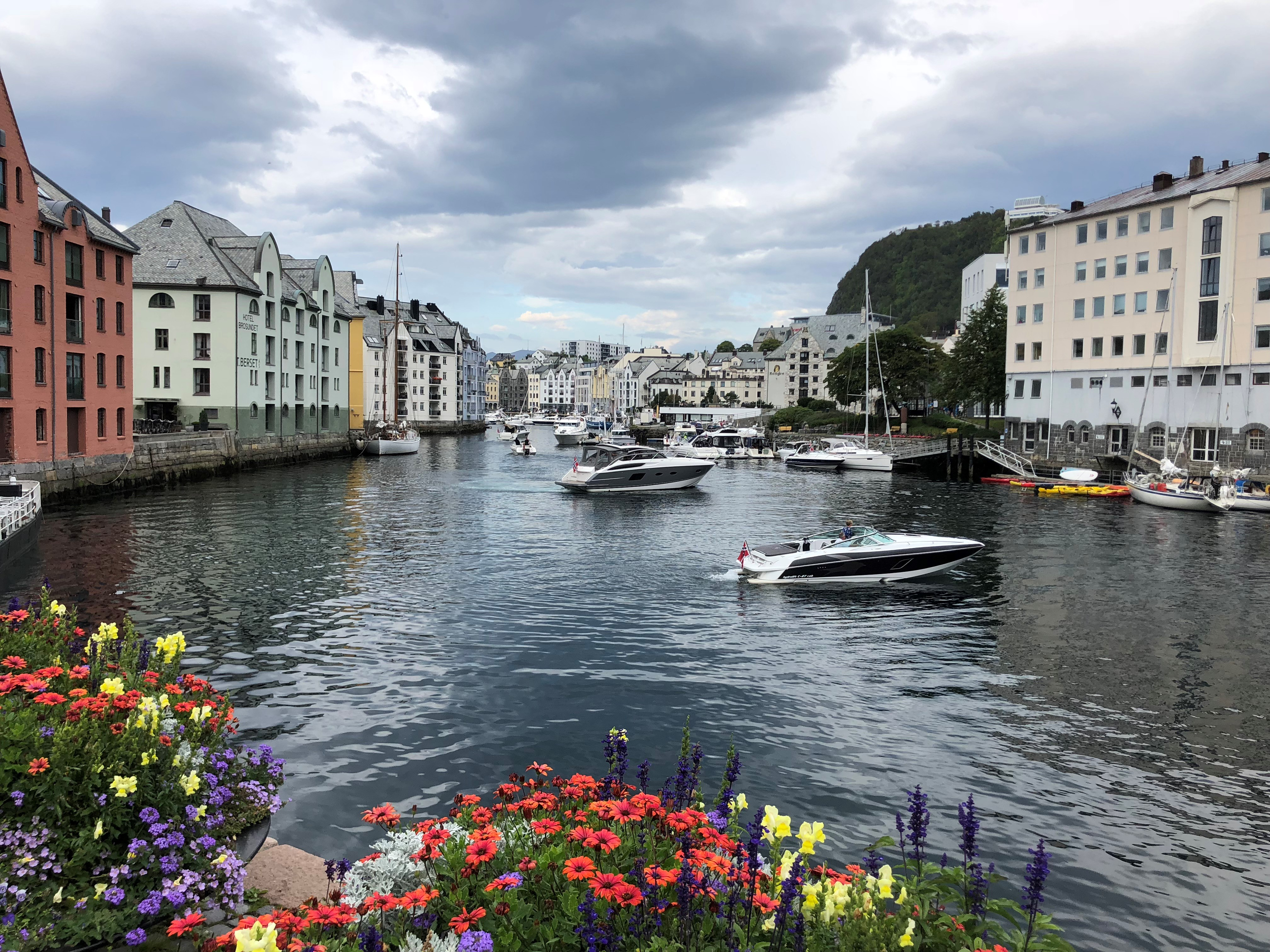
Ålesund harbour

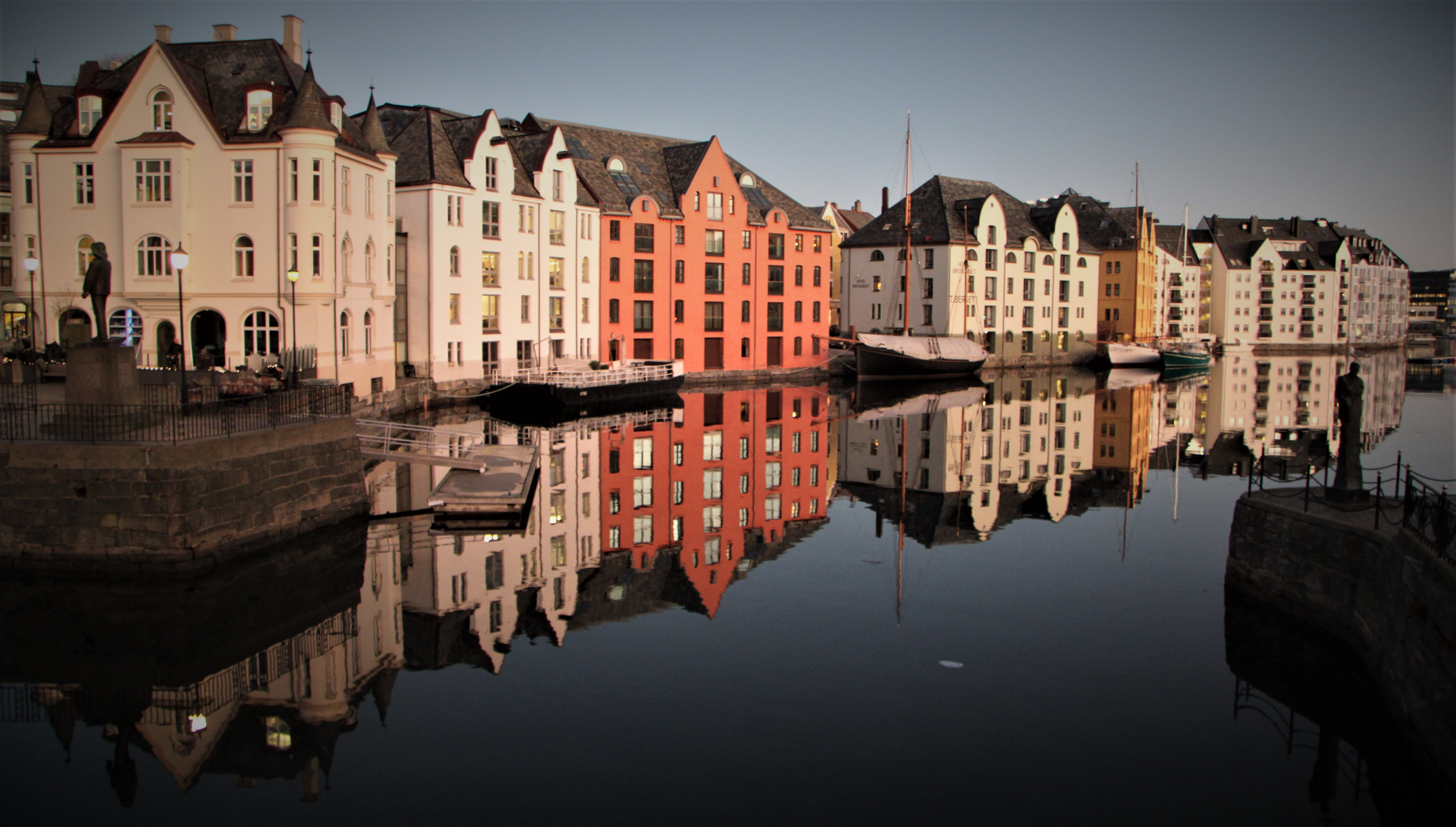

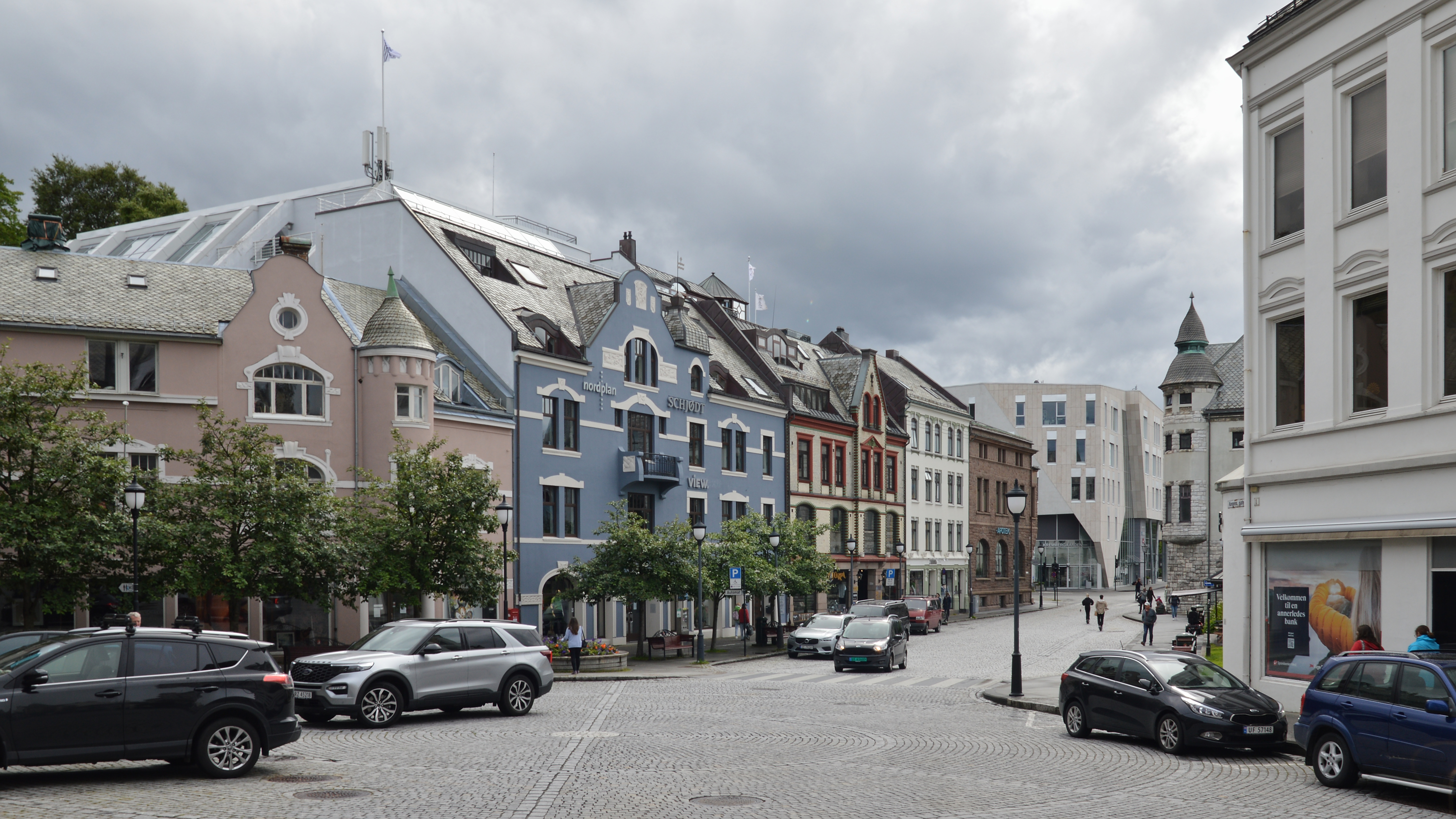
Ålesund, 2022

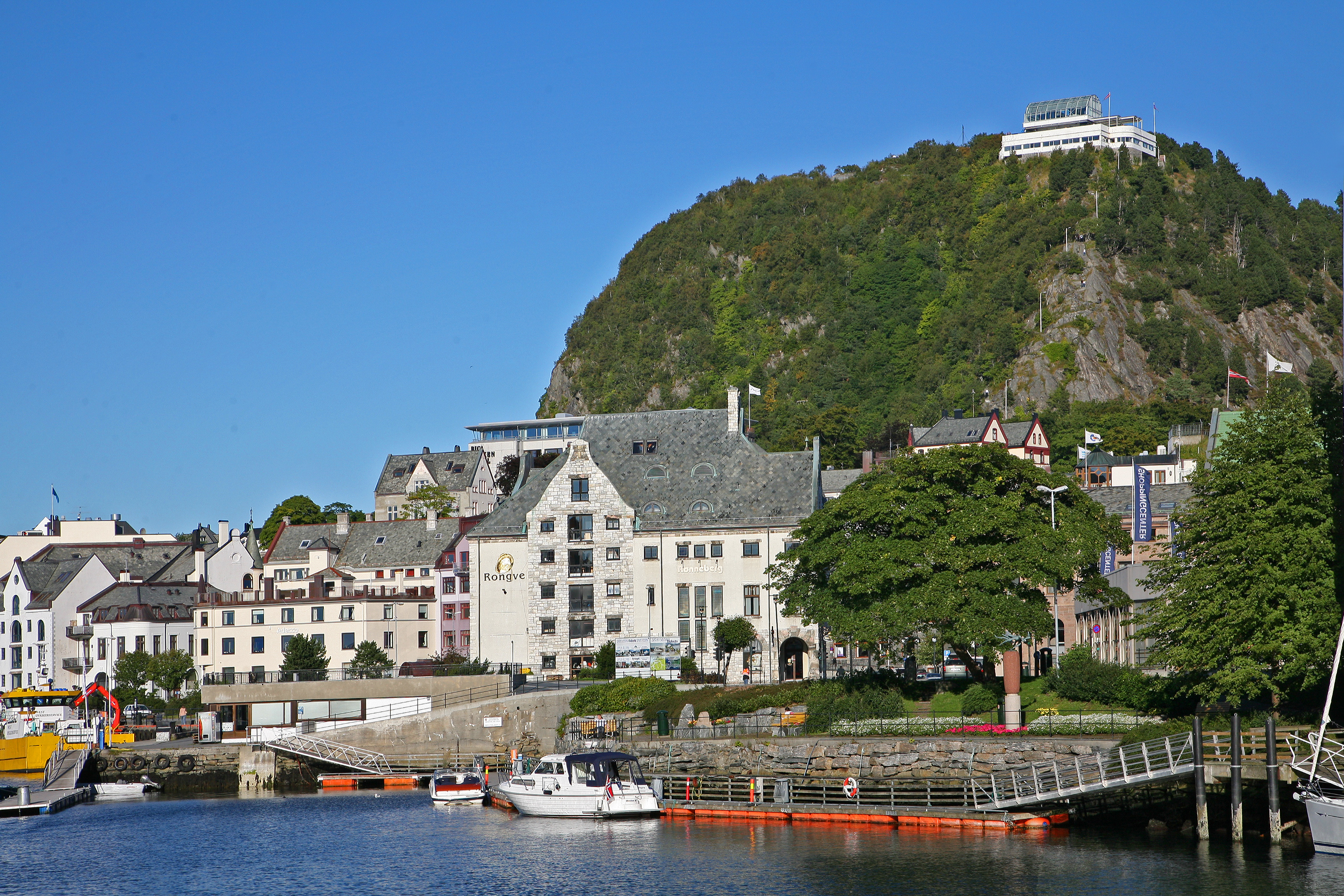
The viewpoint Aksla in the summer of 2010

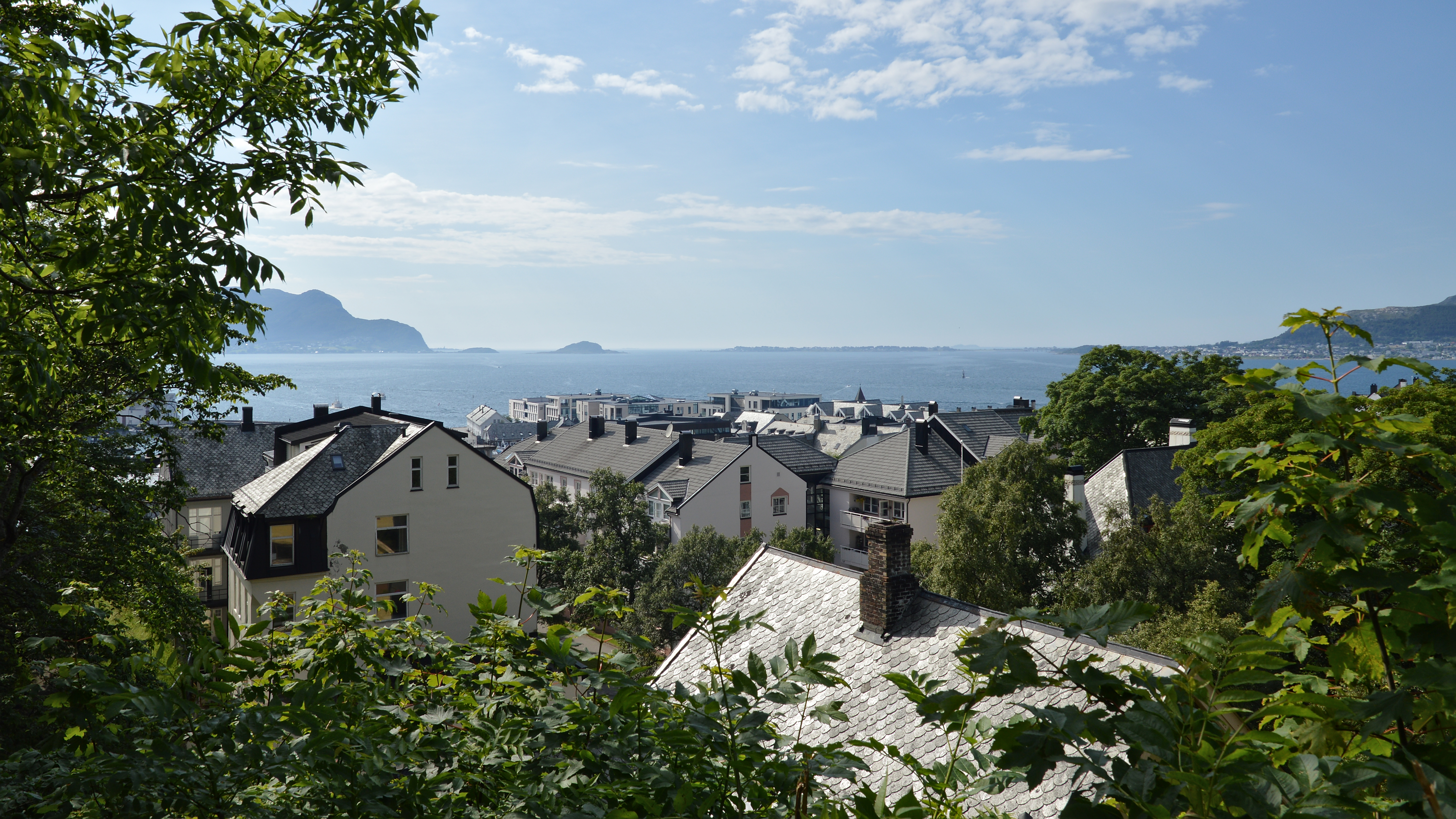

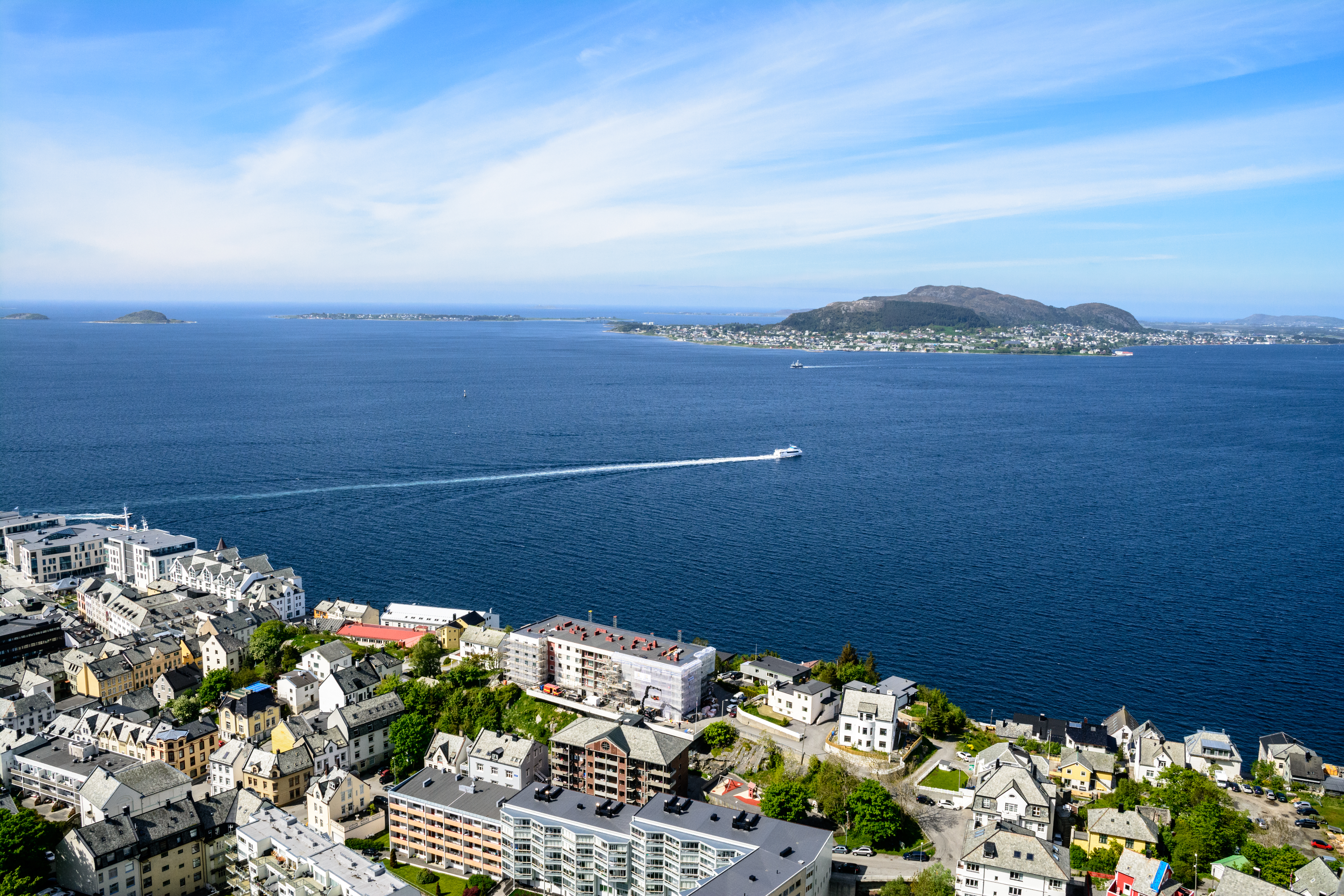

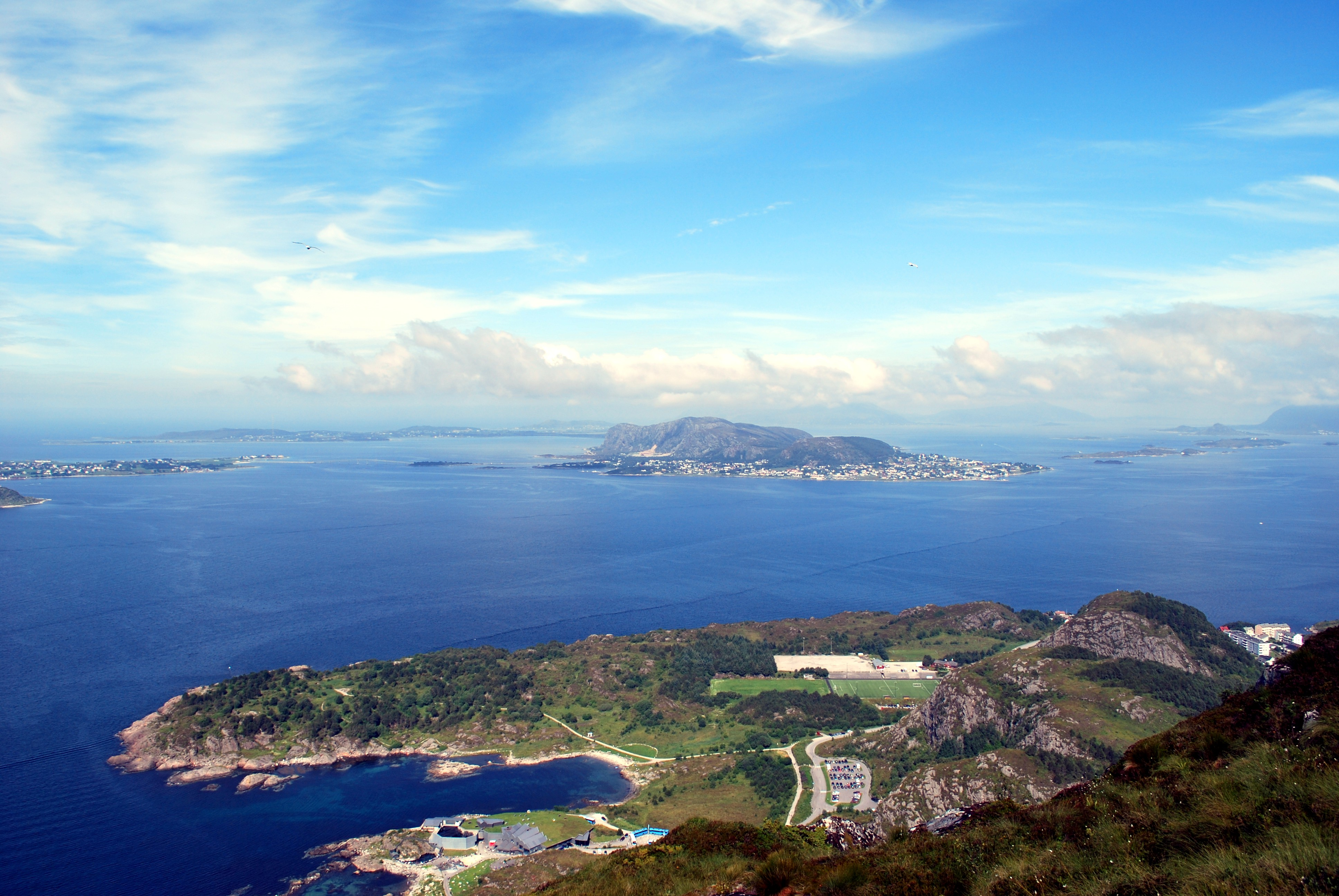
Tueneset in Ålesund

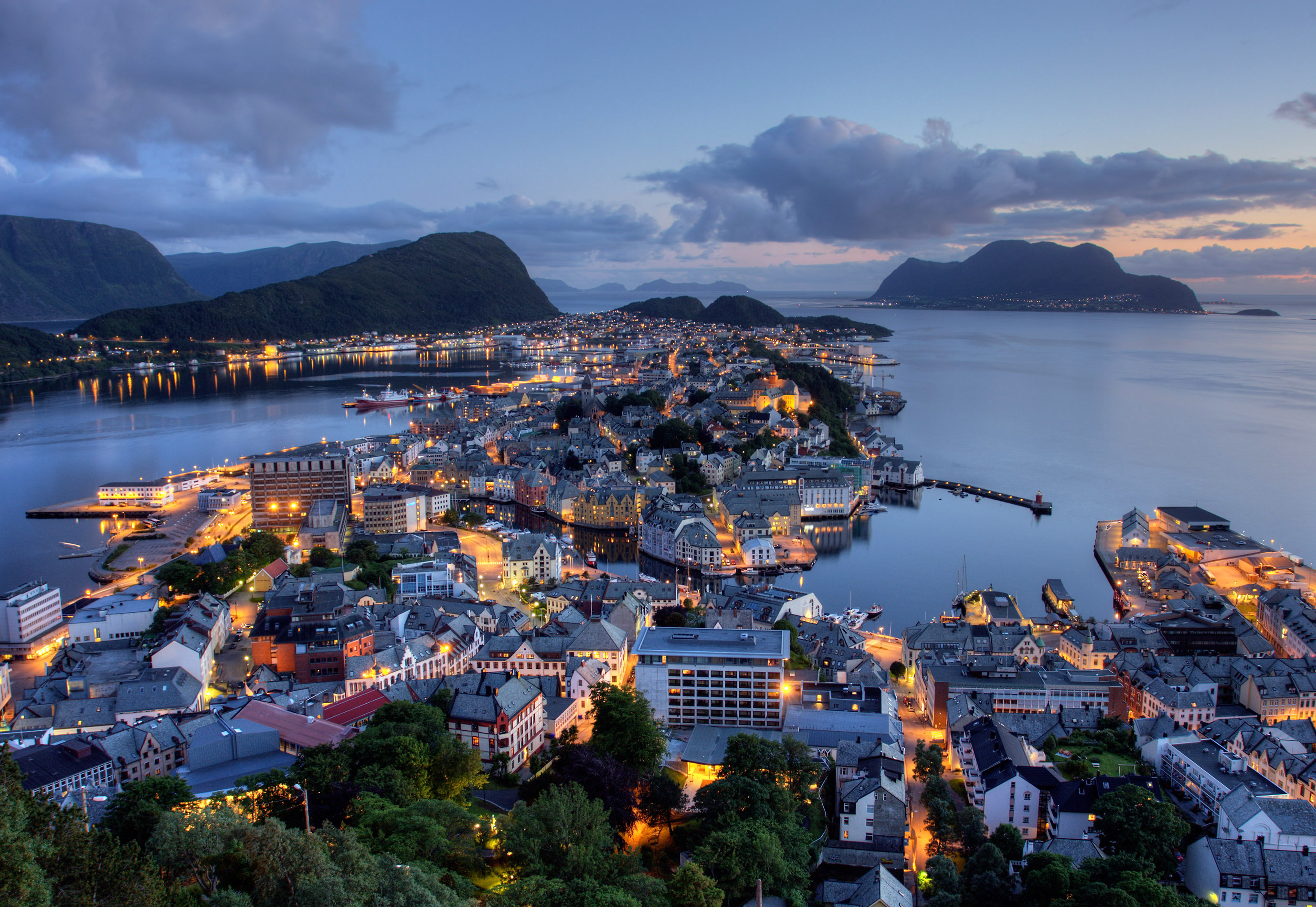
Ålesund in July 2010

== See also ==
- List of towns and cities in Norway
- Ny-Ålesund, a settlement on Svalbard
