= Magne Hovden =

Norwegian writer (born 1974)

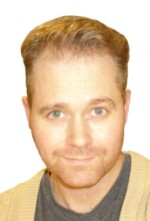
- Born: 23 October 1974 (age 51); Ålesund, Norway
- Occupation: Writer
- Writing career
- Genre: Humour

Magne Hovden (born 23 October 1974) is a Norwegian writer. He is also an independent literary agent and has previously worked as a translator. He has written one children's book, Pugg's Diary, and humour books.

He currently lives in Kirkenes, in the far north of Norway.

== Bibliography ==
- Leif J@nsson: ville spørsmål og reflekterte svar, 2006
- Ruben, 2007
- Puggs Dagbok, 2009
- Sameland, 2010
- MGP, 2011
