= Jugendstilsenteret =

Museum in Ålesund, Norway

Coordinates: 62.47101°N 6.15109°E

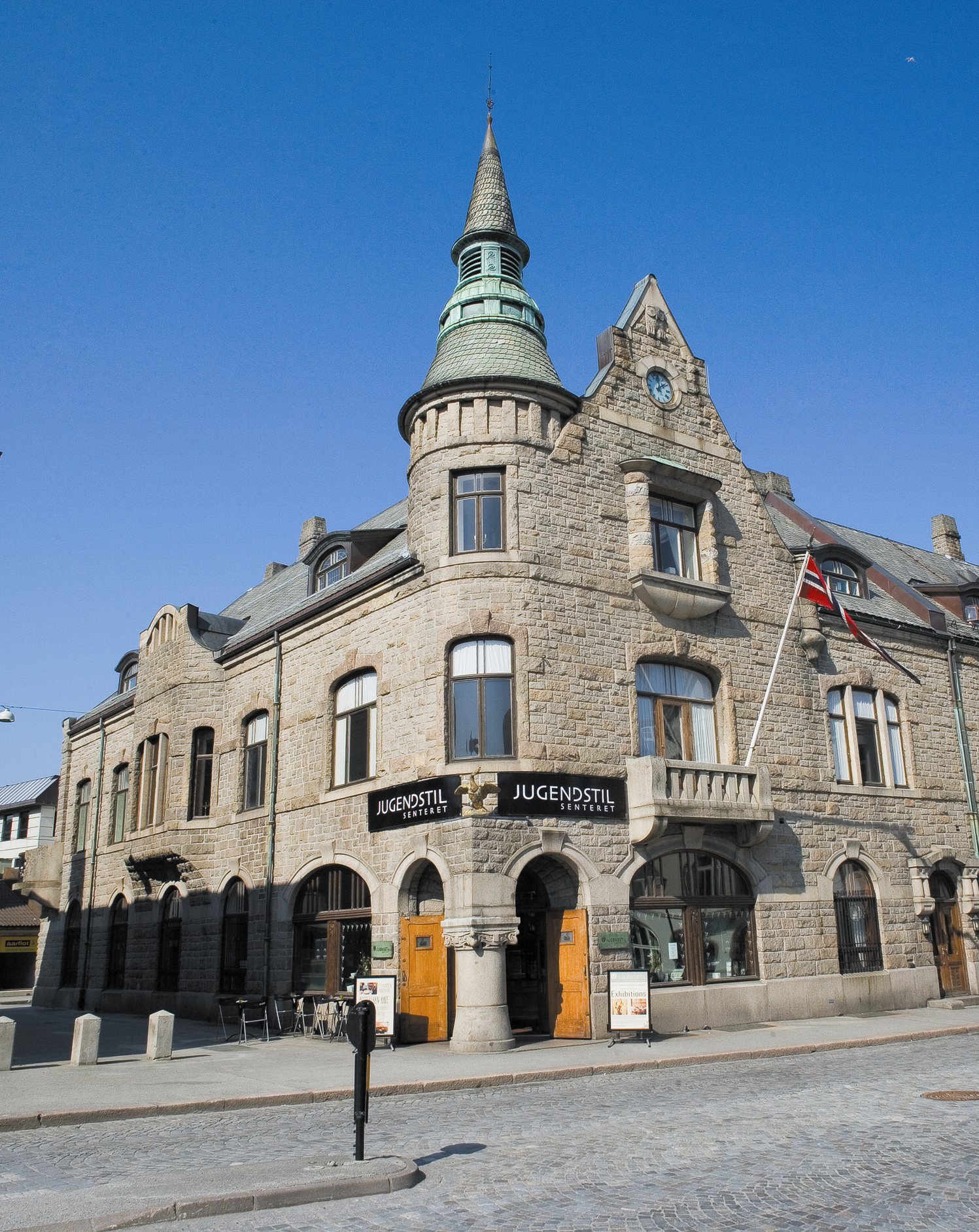
Jugendstilsenteret in Ålesund, Norway.

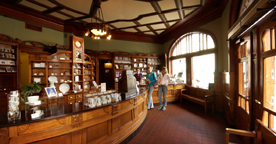
Entrance to Jugendstilsenteret.

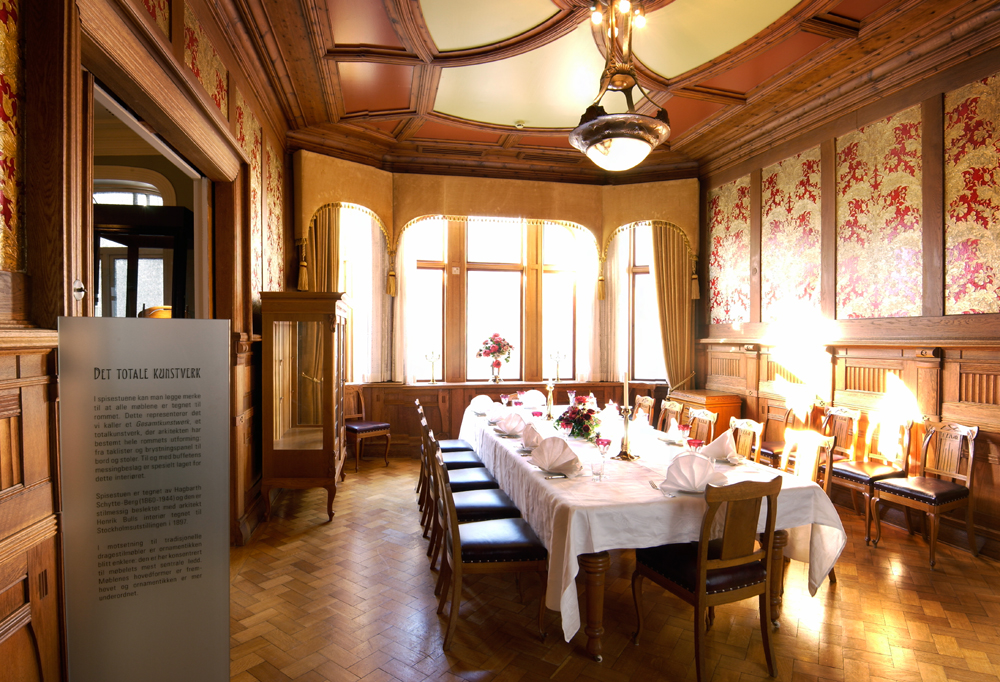
The pharmacists dining room, exhibited at Jugendstilsenteret.

Jugendstilsenteret is an Art Nouveau Center located in central Ålesund, in Møre og Romsdal, Norway.

Jugendstilsenteret is part of the Foundation Cultural Quarter in Ålesund. The Art Nouveau Center is located in the former Art Nouveau designed building of Swan Pharmacy (Svaneapoteket i Ålesund). The building itself was designed by Norwegian architect Hagbarth Martin Schytte-Berg (1860–1944) and built between 1905 and 1907. It was the first listed Art Nouveau / Jugendstil monument in Ålesund (1984) and it includes the town's best preserved Art Nouveau interior. Jugendstilsenteret is an interpretive center exhibiting both modern multimedia exhibitions and international art. The Art Nouveau center was opened by Queen Sonja of Norway on 6 June 2003. The center was selected as the millennium site for Møre og Romsdal county.

== See also ==
- Jugendstil
