= Apoteket Hjorten =

Cultural asset in Norway

Coordinates: 59°54′47.92″N 10°45′36.28″E

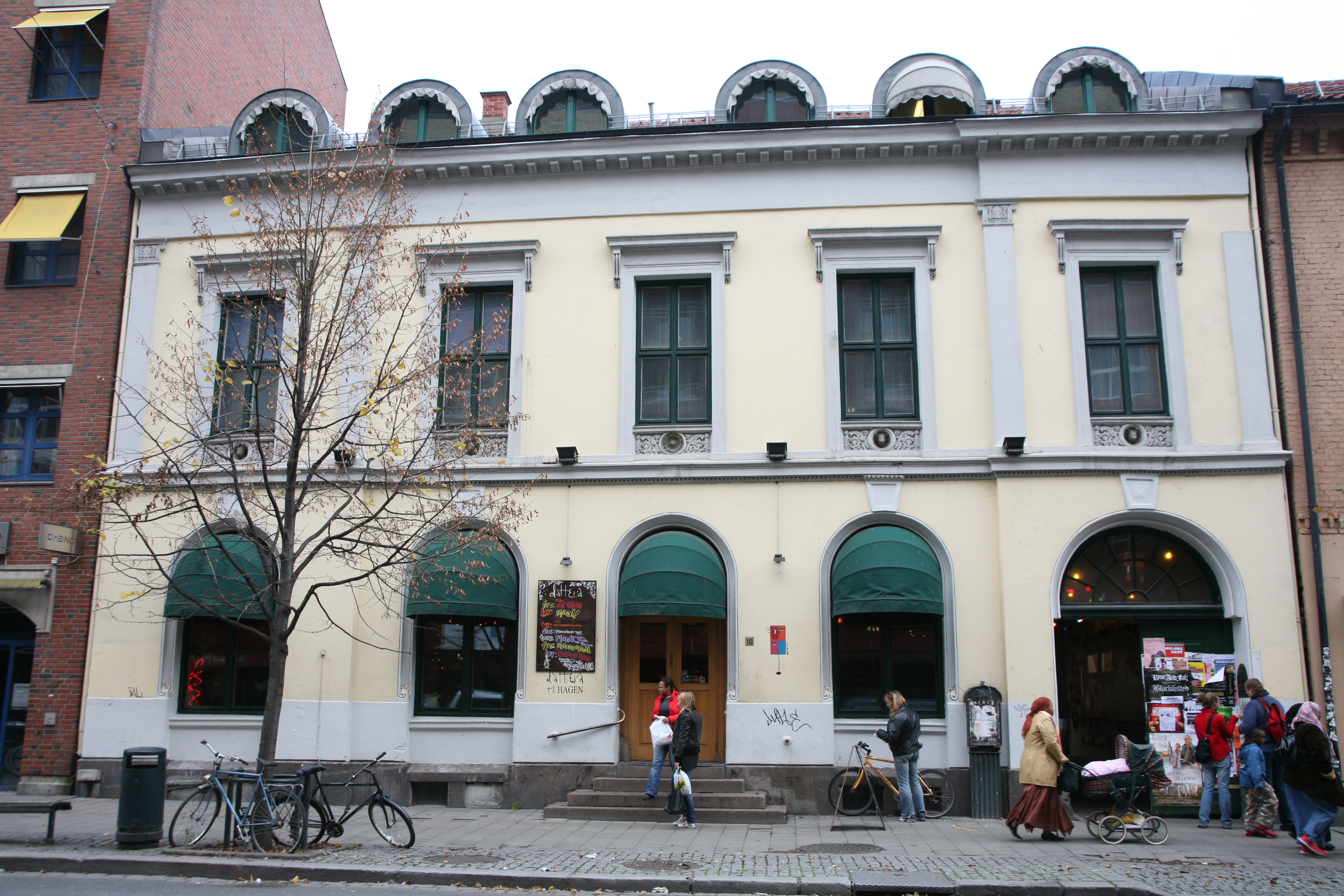
Grønland 10 in Oslo, the former Apoteket Hjorten.

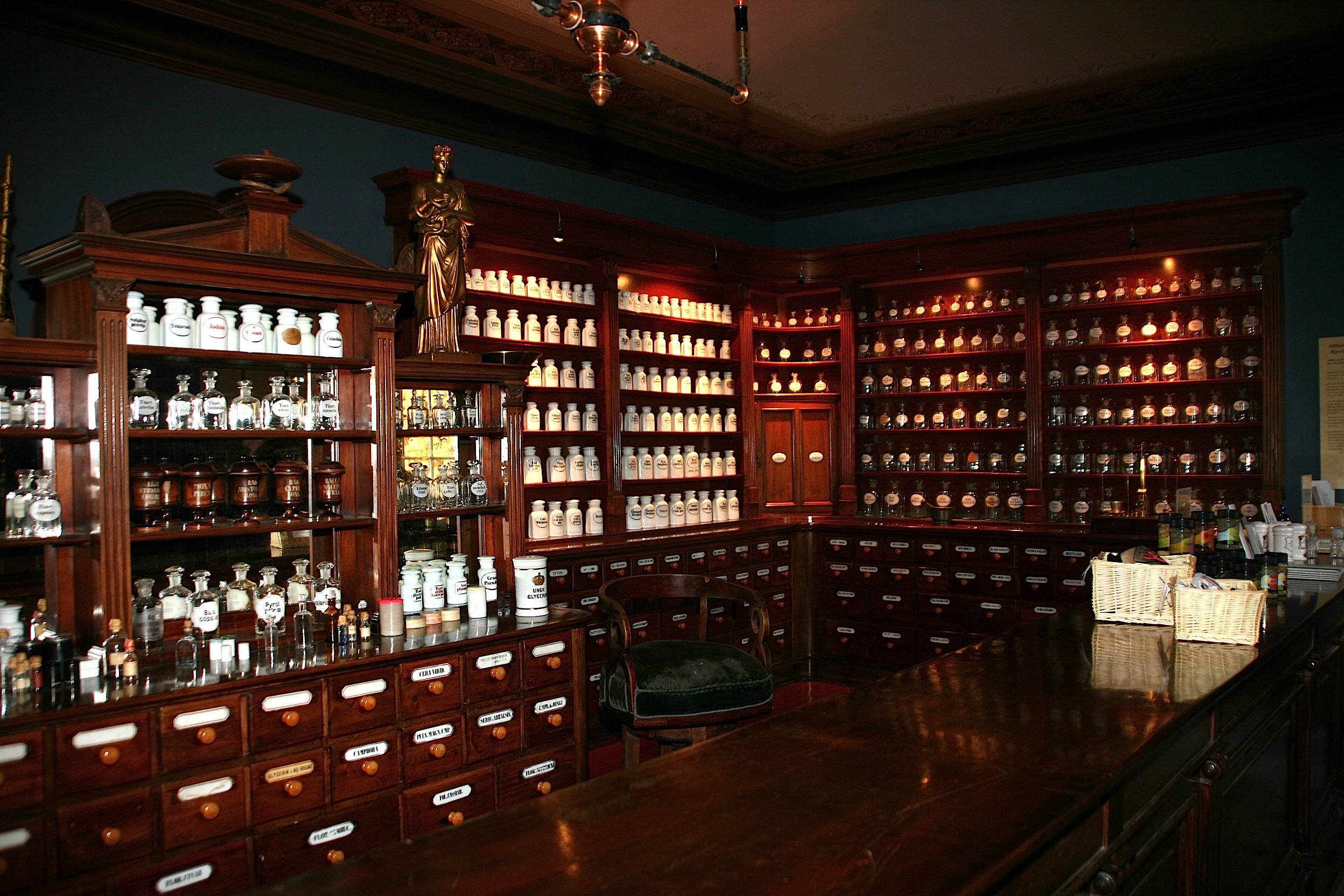
Interior from Apoteket Hjorten in Oslo, now mounted in Pharmacy Historical Museum of Norway at Bygdøy.

Apoteket Hjorten (English: Pharmacy Hjorten) was a pharmacy located at Grønland in Oslo, Norway. The name "Apoteket Hjorten" is used for a number of pharmacies in several Norwegian cities such as Fredrikstad and Trondheim. The pharmacy is now renamed to Vitusapotek Hjorten, and the modern building is located in Smalgangen 5.

The pharmacy opened in 1857 after it was determined by a royal decree on December 4, 1856. Apoteket Hjorten was the fifth pharmacy in Christiania. After a fire in year 1859 in which 18 people died, a new pharmacy building was built. The construction of this building, which was designed by Chr. H. Grosch, finished in 1861. After a rebuilding in 1963, the original officine was handed by pharmacist Anders Tenøe to Pharmacy Historical Museum of Norway (Norwegian: Norsk Farmasihistorisk Museum) and mounted in its entirety in the Norwegian Museum of Cultural History (No: Norsk folkemuseum) at Bygdøy. The pharmacy was rebuilt in 1986, and refurbished to a restaurant in year 2000. Today, the building houses the restaurant Dattera til Hagen.

== Literature ==
- Fjeldstad, Trygve: «Apoteket Hjorten i Oslo, En langvarig byggesak» i Norges Apotekerforenings Tidsskrift nr.9 1986 pp. 229–235
- Flod, Ingeborg og Bendel, Leif A. Norges Apotek og deres innehavere vol III pp. 393–397, vol VI p. 157, vol. VII pp. 203–204, vol. VII p. 398 and last vol. p. 112.
