= Sven Sømme =

Norwegian zoologist and ichthyologist

- Born: 19 November 1904; Ringsaker Municipality, Norway
- Died: 2 December 1961 (aged 57)
- Occupations: Zoologist; Ichthyologist
- Relatives: Iacob Dybwad Sømme (brother)

Sven Sømme (19 November 1904 – 2 December 1961) was a Norwegian zoologist and ichthyologist.

He was born in Ringsaker Municipality to physician Jacob Dybwad Sømme and Helene Sofie Sørensen. He was a brother of zoologist Iacob Dybwad Sømme, and his sister Ingerid was married to ship owner Sigval Bergesen the Younger. He chaired the fisheries school at Aukra Municipality in 1940, and served as Norway's fisheries inspector from 1946 to 1952. He published works on fish biology, salmon migration and entomology.

During the German occupation of Norway he was active in the clandestine intelligence organization XU. After being caught by the German soldiers while photographing near a torpedo base on Otrøya (June 1944) he managed to escape from the guards at Åndalsnes. With the help of locals including mountaineer Arne Randers Heen he scrambled through the wild mountains between Isfjorden and Eikesdalen. He walked for days through the mountains to a hiding at Atnsjøen. He fled to Sweden and eventually arrived in the United Kingdom.

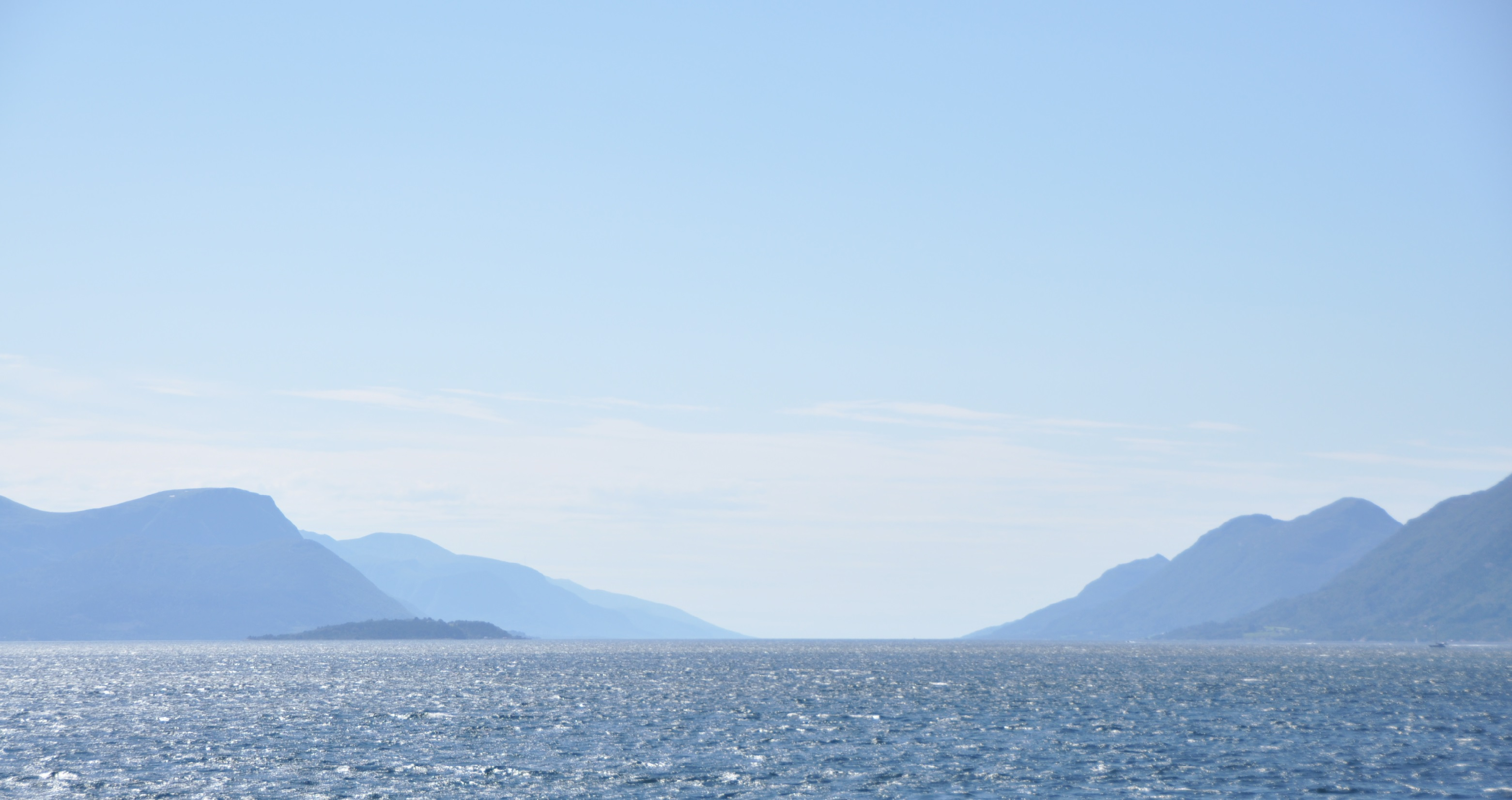
Otrøya island (right hand) were Sømme photographed a torpedo base at Midfjorden.

His brother Iacob Dybwad Sømme was executed in March 1944.

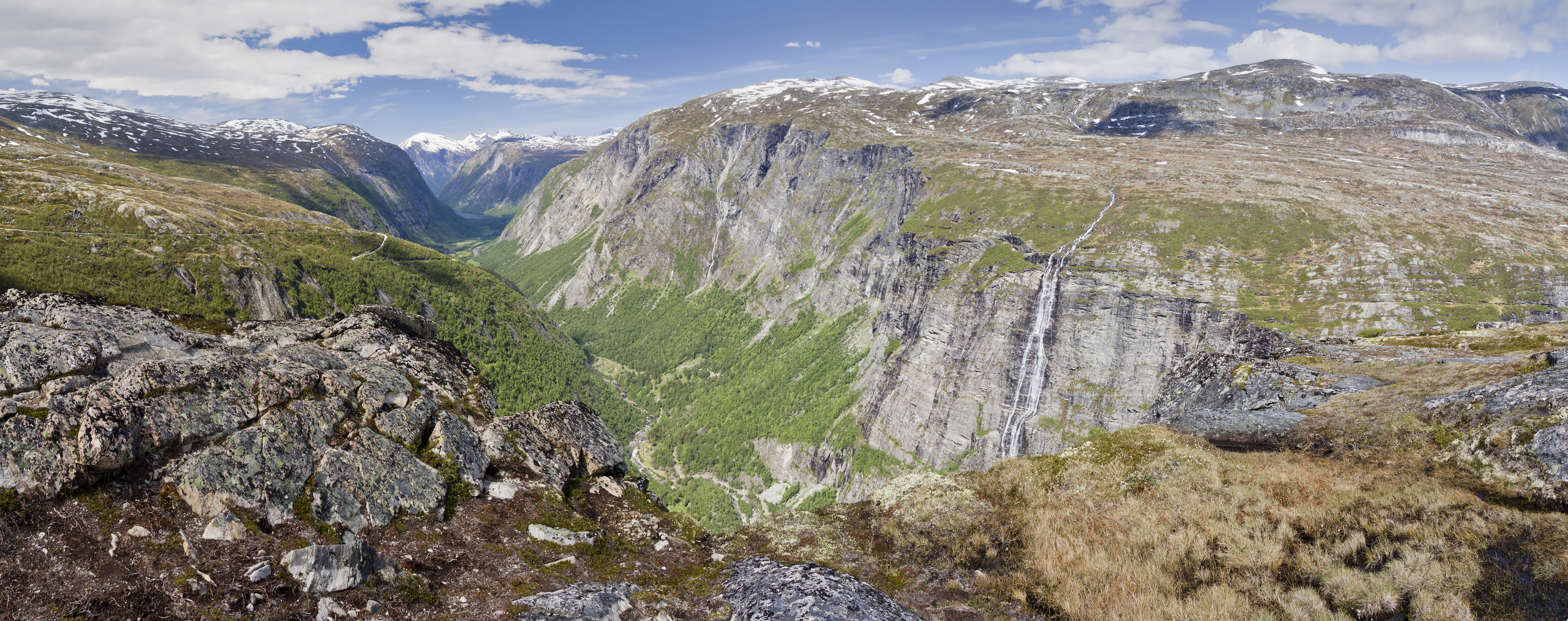
Mountaineer Arne Randers Heen guided Sømme through the steep mountains from Isfjord to Eikesdalen (photo) and locals in Eikesdal helped him through the difficult terrain in from Eikesdal to Aursjøen lake. From there he walked across Norway to Sweden.
