= Arne Randers Heen =

Norwegian mountaineer

- Born: 4 April 1905; Kristiania, Norway
- Died: 7 February 1991 (aged 85); Rauma Municipality, Norway
- Occupation: tailor
- Known for: mountaineering, climbing achievements
- Relatives: Gunnar Randers (half brother); Jørgen Randers (nephew)

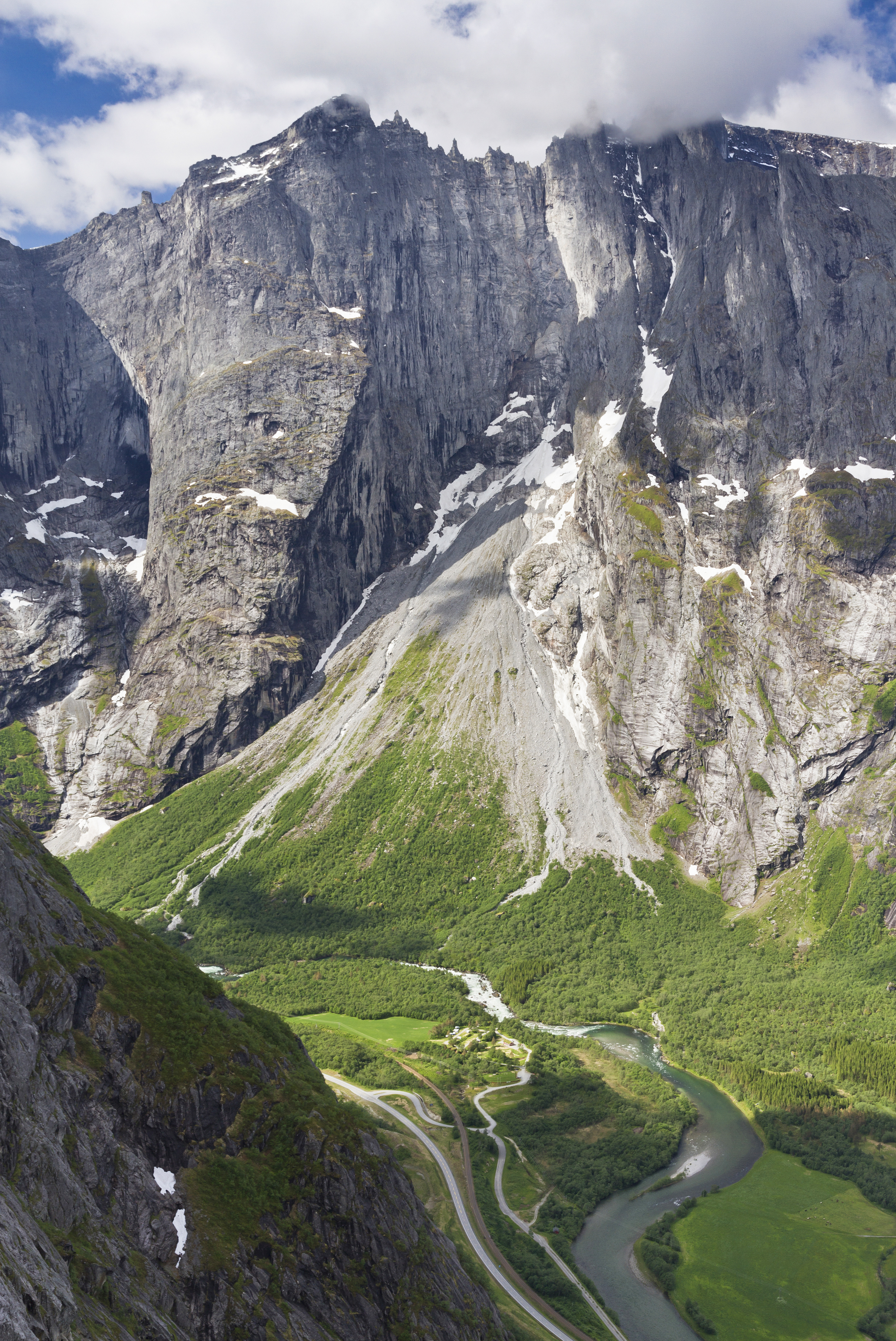
Trollryggen, the tall pillar to the left of Trollveggen and the cone-shaped scree beneath the wall, was first climbed by in 1958 by Arne Randers Heen (then 53 years) with Ralph Høibakk (21). Høibakk climbed the route again 50 years later.

Arne Randers Heen (4 April 1905 – 7 February 1991) was a Norwegian mountain climber and member of the Norwegian resistance during World War II.

== Personal life ==
Heen was born in Hen Municipality, and worked as a tailor in the nearby town of Åndalsnes. He was a half brother of Gunnar Randers junior and uncle of Jørgen Randers. His father Gunnar Randers Snr. (1877-1963) was a civil engineer that worked in Ålesund after the 1904 fire. Heen's mother Sofie Heen (1877–1959) at the time worked as a waitress in Ålesund. His parents did not marry. Arne Randers Heen was a tailor like his mother.

== Career ==
Heen is known for several first ascents, and his many ascents of Romsdalshorn, including the first winter climbing of the mountain. He was Norway's leading mountaineer from the 1920s to the 1950s. Heen was largely autodidact in mountaineering, and an unconventional outsider to a sport defined by Norsk Tindeklub in Oslo's western suburbs. He did not have a single accident during his life in the mountains. In 1926 he climbed solo (alone) the south wall of Romsdalshorn, at the time a groundbreaking achievement. Heen had several times attempted Trollryggen, a 2 kilometer long pillar at the edge of Trollveggen. One attempt was in the summer of 1940 with Arne Næss. In 1958 he finally succeeded together with Ralph Høibakk, their only equipment was rope, 10 pitons, 6 carabiners and a hammer each. Ten years later, with improved equipment, the two climbed the route in only 10 hours. In 1984 he was one of the guides for Carl Boenish and his wife during their BASE-jumping in the area.

During the Second World War he worked for the resistance movement and the allied intelligence. Heen helped XU-agent Sven Sømme escape through a difficult mountain pass between Isfjorden and Eikesdalen. He also helped escaped Russian prisoners climb through the mountains to Valldal where locals protected the Russians until the end of the war. At Åndalsnes the Estonian Harry Wood worked at the headquarter of Organisation Todt. Wood handed over detailed maps and photos of German military facilities along the coast between Stad and Bergen to Heen. Wood's documents were an intelligence sensation for the allied. Heen helped Wood escape to Sweden in exchange for the documents.

== Awards ==
- 1939: Medal for Heroic Deeds
- 1963: Royal Norwegian Society of Sciences and Letters' medal
- 1973: King's Medal of Merit
- Honorary member of Norsk Tindeklubb
