= Hans Landa =

Inglourious Basterds antagonist

- Inglourious Basterds character
- First appearance: Inglourious Basterds (2009)
- Created by: Quentin Tarantino
- Portrayed by: Christoph Waltz

In-universe information
- Nicknames: The Jew Hunter (German; Der Judenjäger)
- Title: Standartenführer
- Occupation: Sicherheitsdienst member
- Affiliation: Austrian Nazi Party
- Allegiance: Nazi Germany

Standartenführer Hans Landa is the main antagonist in the 2009 Quentin Tarantino film Inglourious Basterds. He is portrayed by Christoph Waltz. For his performance, Waltz received widespread acclaim and garnered numerous accolades.

== Character summary ==
Standartenführer (SS Colonel) Hans Landa is an Austrian SS officer assigned to the Sicherheitsdienst (SD). He is nicknamed "the Jew Hunter" for his uncanny ability to locate Jews hiding throughout Occupied France. Egotistical and ambitious, Landa takes a great deal of pride in his fearsome reputation, lauding his nickname and using it to compare himself to his boss Reinhard Heydrich, whom he describes as disliking the nickname the people of Prague bestowed upon him ("The Hangman"). Besides speaking German, he is also fluent in at least French, English, and Italian. Landa is intelligent, opportunistic, arrogant, ruthless, and relentless; but can also be circumspect, polite, and charming.

When the tide of the war turns against the Nazis, he scoffs at it, alluding that his job is to find and capture people and the fact that they are Jews is of no consequence to him. However, by the end of the film, he reveals his amoral nature and opportunistically switches sides to assist the Basterds in assassinating Hitler and a number of Nazi Party elite inside a movie theater. In return for his role in the plot, Landa demands full immunity for his war crimes and various other rewards and compensations. The surviving Basterds let him live, but betray him by killing the radio operator and carving a swastika into his forehead to ensure he can never escape his original Nazi ties.

In 2019, Tarantino appeared on the podcast Happy Sad Confused, where he discussed Landa's fate after the events of the film. Tarantino stated that Landa is recognized as a hero in United States and history books for his involvement in ending World War II and helping to kill Hitler, and that he subsequently settles in the American village of Nantucket, where he is hired to solve a series of murders as an amateur master detective.

== Conception and creation ==
Landa is based on Alois Brunner while the fictional name might be inspired by SS officer Hans Latza.

Quentin Tarantino has said that Landa might be the greatest character he has ever written. He originally wanted Leonardo DiCaprio for the part. Tarantino then decided to have the character played by a German actor. The role ultimately went to the Austrian Christoph Waltz, who, according to Tarantino, "gave me my movie back", as he felt the movie could not be made without Landa as a character, but feared the part was "unplayable".

When Waltz auditioned for the role, he had no prior correspondence with Tarantino or producer Lawrence Bender, and believed that the character of Hans Landa was being used during the audition process to cast other roles. Waltz stated that he was most impressed with the dialogue and the depth of the character.

Waltz has described Landa's character as one who has an understanding of how the world works, stating that the swastika means nothing to him. He adds that he is not driven by ideology, and that if anyone were to call Landa a Nazi, he would clarify that he was not, stating that just because he wears a Nazi uniform does not mean that he believes in the Nazi ideology. In describing the ending between the Basterds and Landa, he describes him as "realistic to the point of being inhuman", adding that he understands that the world is not just one thing at a time, and even though these things may contradict each other, they do not necessarily have to.

== Reception ==
...a character unlike any Nazi — indeed, anyone at all — I’ve seen in a movie: evil, sardonic, ironic, mannered, absurd.

— Roger Ebert

Waltz received widespread critical acclaim for his role as Landa, and won the Best Actor Award at the 2009 Cannes Film Festival for his performance. Due to his role as Hans Landa, Waltz has received many offers from directors to play roles in their films, enough for him to describe the situation as "wild".

Film editor Hunter Stephenson commented that international viewers, Americans more so, would be surprised by Waltz's talent in this role, adding that he tipped Waltz to be nominated an Academy Award for Best Supporting Actor. Waltz was awarded several accolades for his performance, including the Golden Globe Award for Best Supporting Actor and the Screen Actors Guild Award in the same category in January 2010. He also won the BAFTA and the Academy Award for Best Supporting Actor, becoming the first actor to win an Oscar for a performance in a Quentin Tarantino film.
