= Iacob Dybwad Sømme =

Norwegian ichthyologist (1898–1944)

Iacob Dybwad Sømme (5 September 1898 – 3 March 1944) was a Norwegian ichthyologist and resistance member.

== Personal life ==
He was born in Etnedal Municipality as a son of chief physician Jacob Dybwad Sømme (1866–1923) and Helene Sofie Sørensen (1870–1955). The family moved to Mesnalien in 1899, Stavanger in 1908 and Molde in 1917. He was a brother of Sven Sømme and first cousin of Axel Sømme. His sister Ingerid Sømme married Sigval Bergesen the Younger, a son of Sigval Bergesen. Iacob Dybwad Sømme married scientist Aslaug Sverdrup (1891–1955), a daughter of bishop and politician Jakob Sverdrup, in January 1930 in Oslo. The marriage lasted until 1942. They had one child together.

== Career ==
Sømme took his examen artium in 1919, studied zoology and was a research fellow for the Directorate of Fisheries from 1924 to 1926, and graduated from the Royal Frederick University in 1930 with the mag.scient. degree. He was a consultant for the Norwegian Association of Hunters and Anglers from 1931 to 1940, and spent much time on the research of freshwater fishing, particularly the biology of the trout. In 1941 he released his main work about trout, Ørretboka. As well as the 1937 handbook Amatørfiske og sportsfiske i sjøen, it was revered by sport fishers.

== Resistance ==
During the occupation of Norway by Nazi Germany, Sømme participated in the Norwegian resistance movement. He was an early member of the military organization Milorg, helped build up the organization and acted as its head of communications in South Norway. In October 1942 he was discovered by a denouncer. He was captured, incarcerated and tortured at Victoria Terrasse, later in Grini concentration camp from 31 October. He was sentenced to death in November 1943, by a court-martial (an SS- und Polizeigericht) led by Hans Paul Latza.

He was executed at Trandumskogen on 3 March 1944 together with six other men, including sports official Osmund Brønnum. Sømme was buried at Vår Frelsers gravlund.
