= Osmund Brønnum =

Norwegian sports official and communist resistance member (1907-1944)

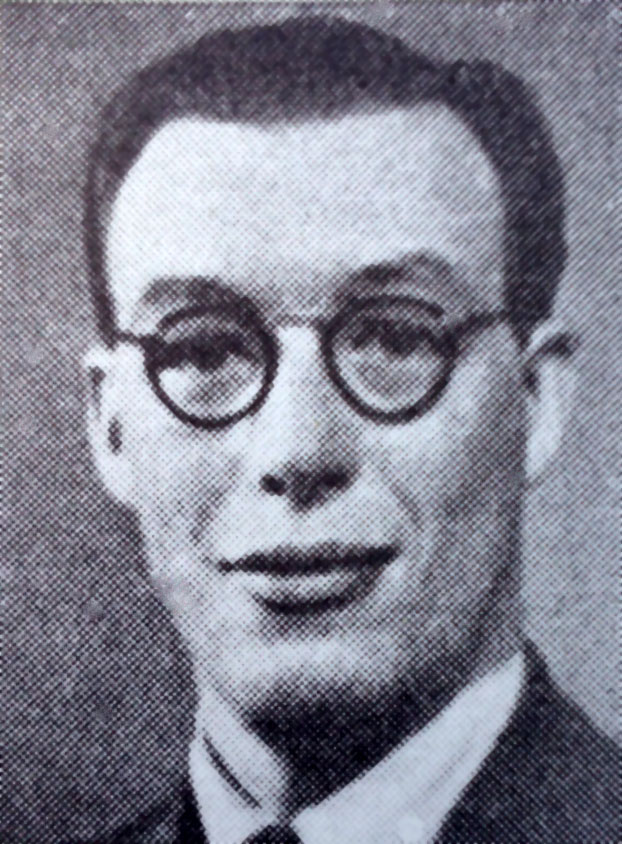
Osmund Brønnum

Osmund Lindgaard Brønnum (23 March 1907 – 3 March 1944) was a Norwegian sports official and communist resistance member.

He was born in Sandeherad Municipality outside of Sandefjord as a son of Nils Olsen and Hilda Larsen; both from Sandar. After his father's death in 1908, his mother Hilda lost the small farm and moved with the children to Oslo, then named Kristiania, in order to find work.

From 1929 to 1932 he was enrolled at the KUNMZ University in Moscow, Russia. On his return he was elected leader of the NKU, The Young Communist League, the youth wing of the NKP, the Communist Party of Norway. In 1937 he married Dagny, a woman from Drammen. He was employed as a functionary for the municipal sports fields of Oslo. He was active in the trade union Friområdenes Fagforening, a member body of the Union of Municipal Employees. As a boxer, he represented the sports club Vika IF, and was a part of the leadership in the Workers' Confederation of Sports. In 1939 he supported the merger between the workers' and bourgeois sports organizations, in order to create a unity front against fascism.

During the occupation of Norway by Nazi Germany, Brønnum participated in the Norwegian resistance movement in various ways. He worked in the illegal press, and also joined the military organization Milorg, founding its East End branch of District 13. He was also a central committee member of the Communist Party of Norway, which was banned from August 1940. He was arrested by the Nazis for the first time on 3 October 1940, and was incarcerated in Møllergata 19 until 4 December 1940. In April 1943 he had to flee the country for neutral Sweden, but this was discovered by a denouncer, and Brønnum was held up at Skotterud, not far from the Swedish border. Before his second arrest, he briefly held the title as military leader of the Communist Party resistance.

Arrested on 8 April 1943, he was held in Møllergata 19 to 4 May 1943, then in Grini detention camp to 2 March 1944. He was then transferred to Trandum. He had been sentenced to death in November 1943, by a court-martial (a SS- und Polizeigericht) led by Hans Paul Latza. He was executed at Trandumskogen on 3 March 1944 together with six other men, including biologist Iacob Dybwad Sømme. Brønnum is buried at Nordre gravlund, at the memorial to the 20 members of the Communist Central Committee who were killed by the Nazis during the occupation.
