= Ålesund Church =

Church in Møre og Romsdal, Norway

- Ålesund kyrkje
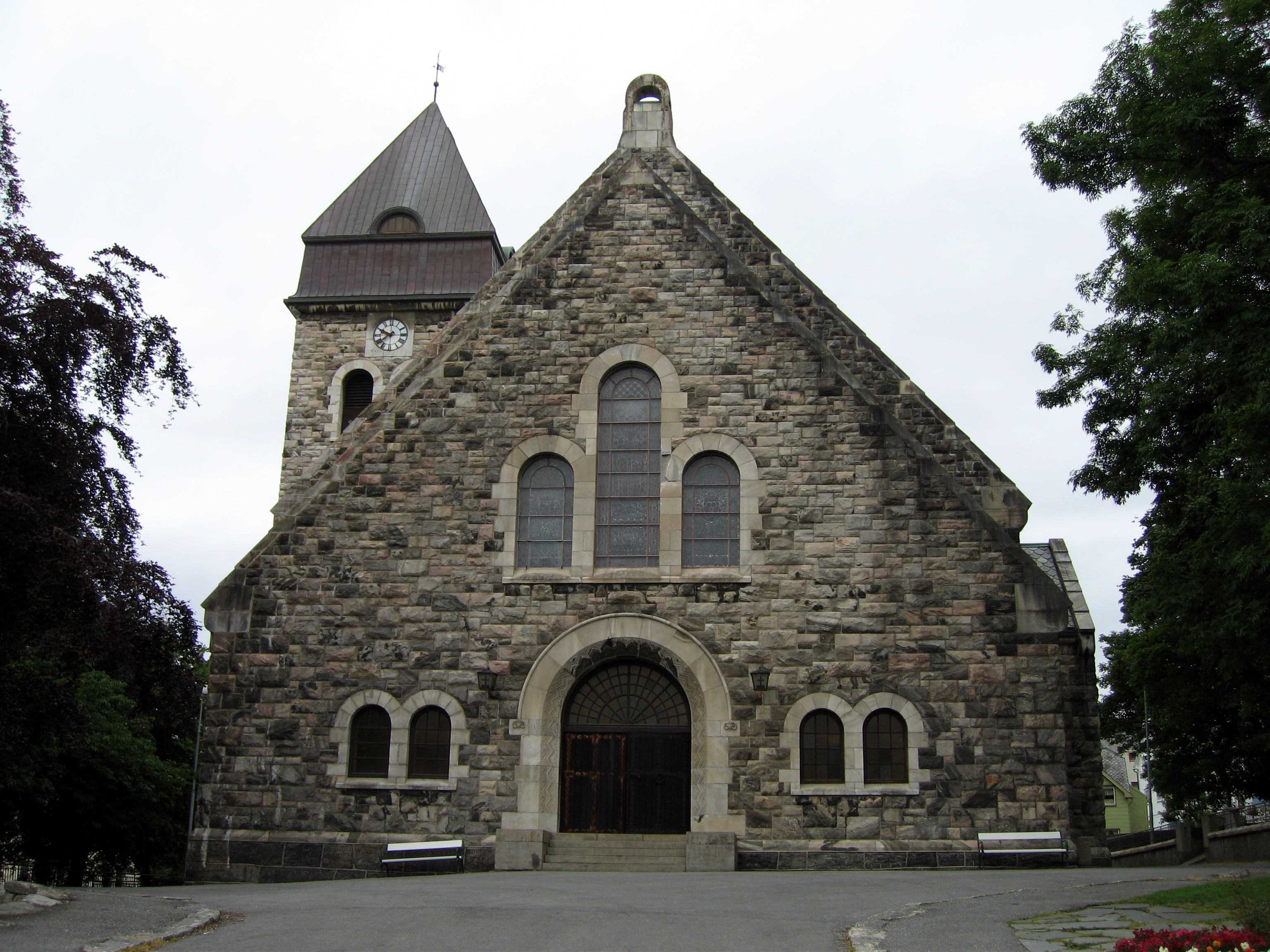
- View of the church
- Ålesund Church
- 62°28′16″N 6°08′45″E
- Location: Ålesund Municipality, Møre og Romsdal
- Country: Norway
- Denomination: Church of Norway
- Churchmanship: Evangelical Lutheran

History
- Status: Parish church
- Founded: 1855
- Consecrated: 15 Sept 1909

Architecture
- Functional status: Active
- Architect: Sverre Knudsen
- Architectural type: Long church
- Style: Art Nouveau
- Completed: 1909 (117 years ago)

Specifications
- Capacity: 800
- Materials: Stone/marble

Administration
- Diocese: Møre bispedømme
- Deanery: Nordre Sunnmøre prosti
- Parish: Ålesund and Volsdalen
- Norwegian Cultural Heritage Site
- Type: Church
- Status: Listed
- ID: 85958

Ålesund Church (Norwegian: Ålesund kyrkje) is a parish church of the Church of Norway in Ålesund Municipality in Møre og Romsdal county, Norway. It is located in the center of the town of Ålesund, on the island of Aspøya. It is one of three churches for the Ålesund and Volsdalen parish which is part of the Nordre Sunnmøre prosti (deanery) in the Diocese of Møre. The large, stone church was built in a long church design and in the Art Nouveau style in 1909 using plans drawn up by the architect Sverre Knudsen. The church seats about 800 people.

== History ==
Historically, the area of Ålesund was part of the Borgund Church parish. In 1848, Ålesund was established as a kjøpstad and soon after it was granted permission to build a church. The first church in Ålesund was constructed in 1853-1854 and it was consecrated on 25 January 1855. The new church became its own parish in 1858. The new church was designed by the architect Heinrich Ernst Schirmer. The church's design was very similar to the Strøm Church in Sør-Odal Municipality (now in Innlandet county). It was built out of brick and it had a cruciform design. The exterior brick was left unpainted, but the western tower was covered in white plaster. On 23 January 1904, the church was destroyed by the great Ålesund fire. Hundreds of buildings were destroyed and nearly the entire town had to be rebuilt. Afterwards, a competition of architects was held to design the new, replacement church building. Sverre Knudsen was chosen as the person to design the new Ålesund Church.

The new church was to be located on the same site as the previous church, although its orientation was reversed (entrance on the east end and the choir on the west end). The foundation stone for the new church was laid down on 13 July 1906 by the new King Haakon VII. The church is a three aisled long church constructed out of stone. Roughly 2,000 square metres (22,000 sq ft) of marble cover the church's façade. The church took about three years to be completed and it was consecrated on 15 September 1909. The tower is asymmetrically located on the south side of the building.

== Gallery ==
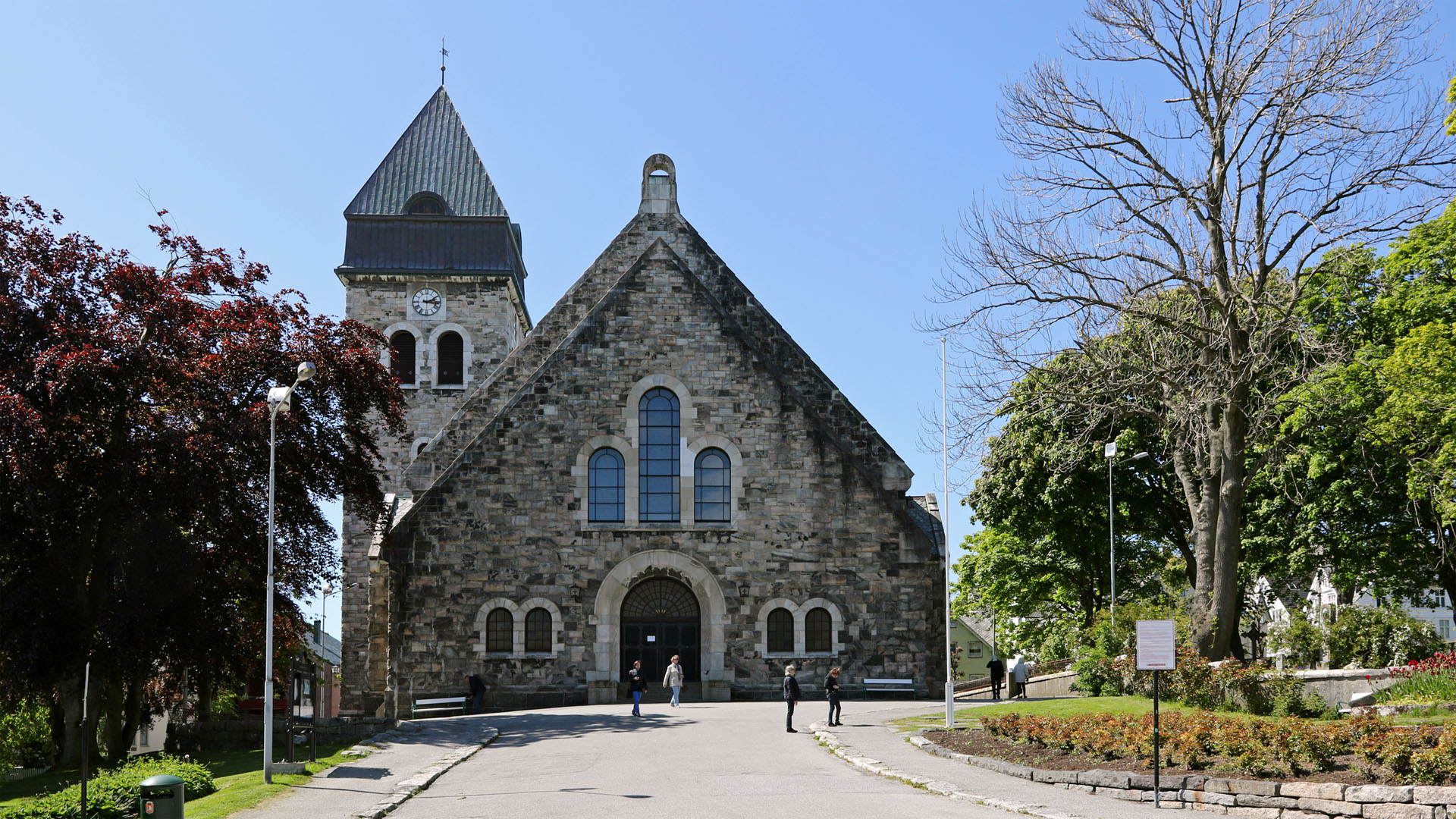

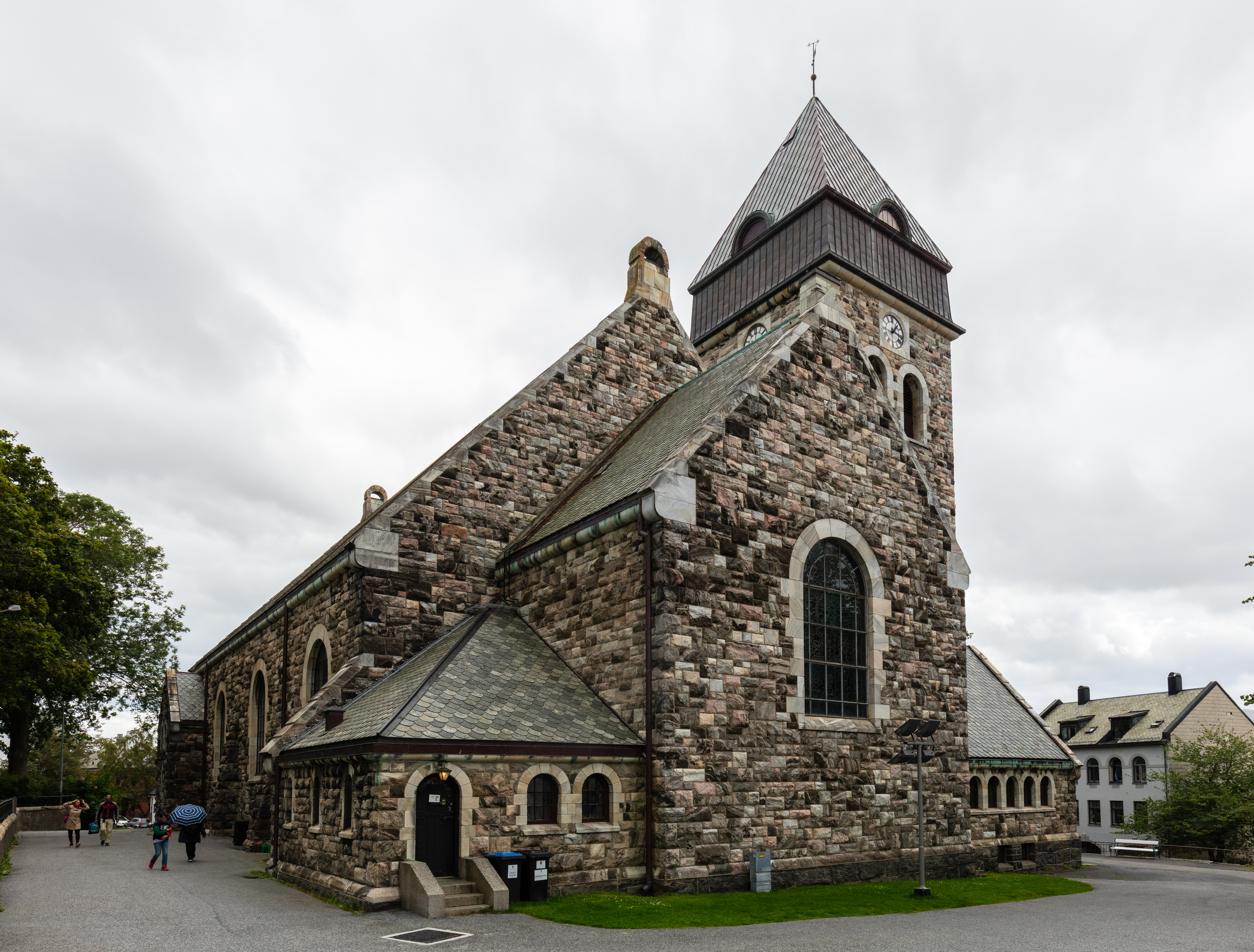

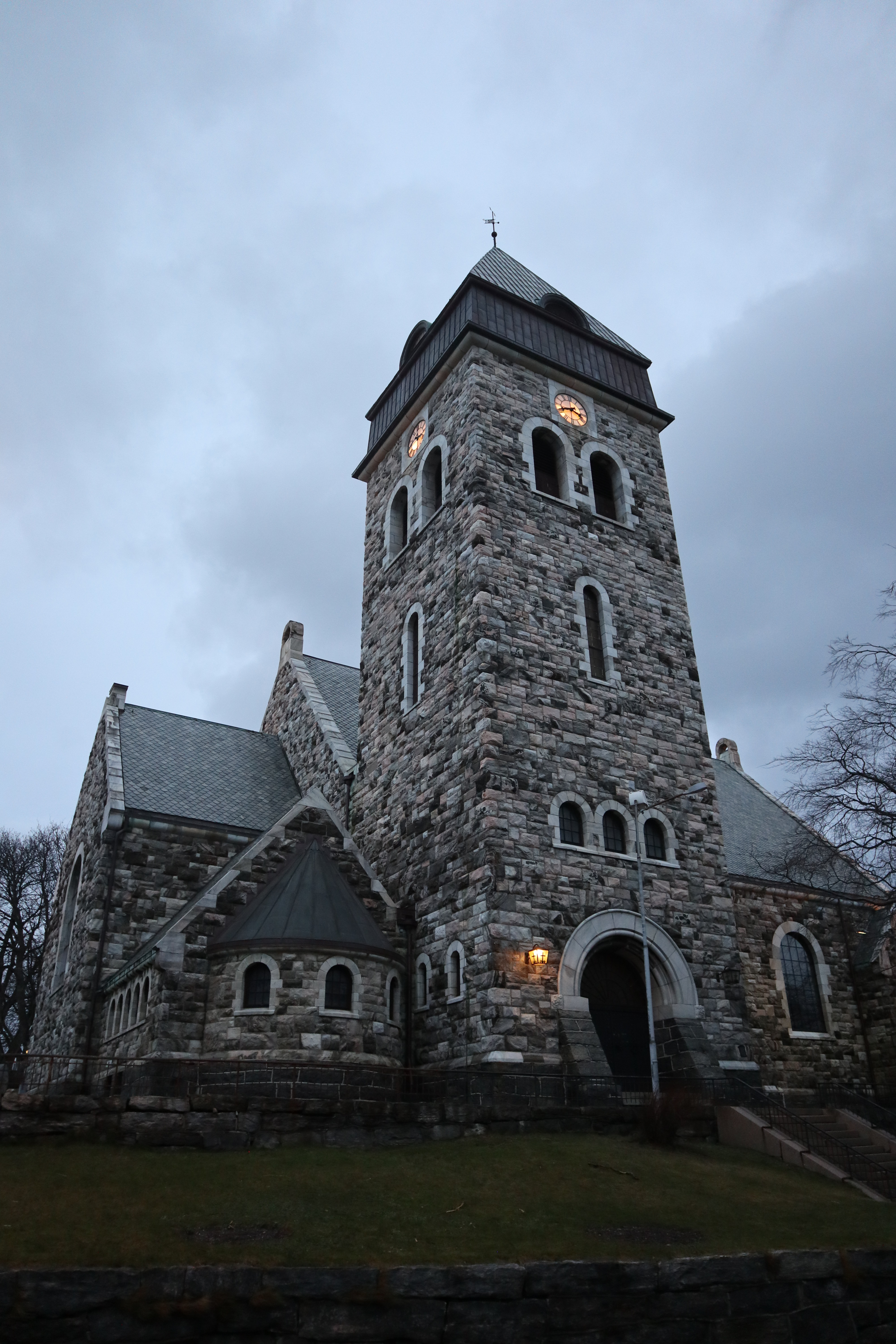

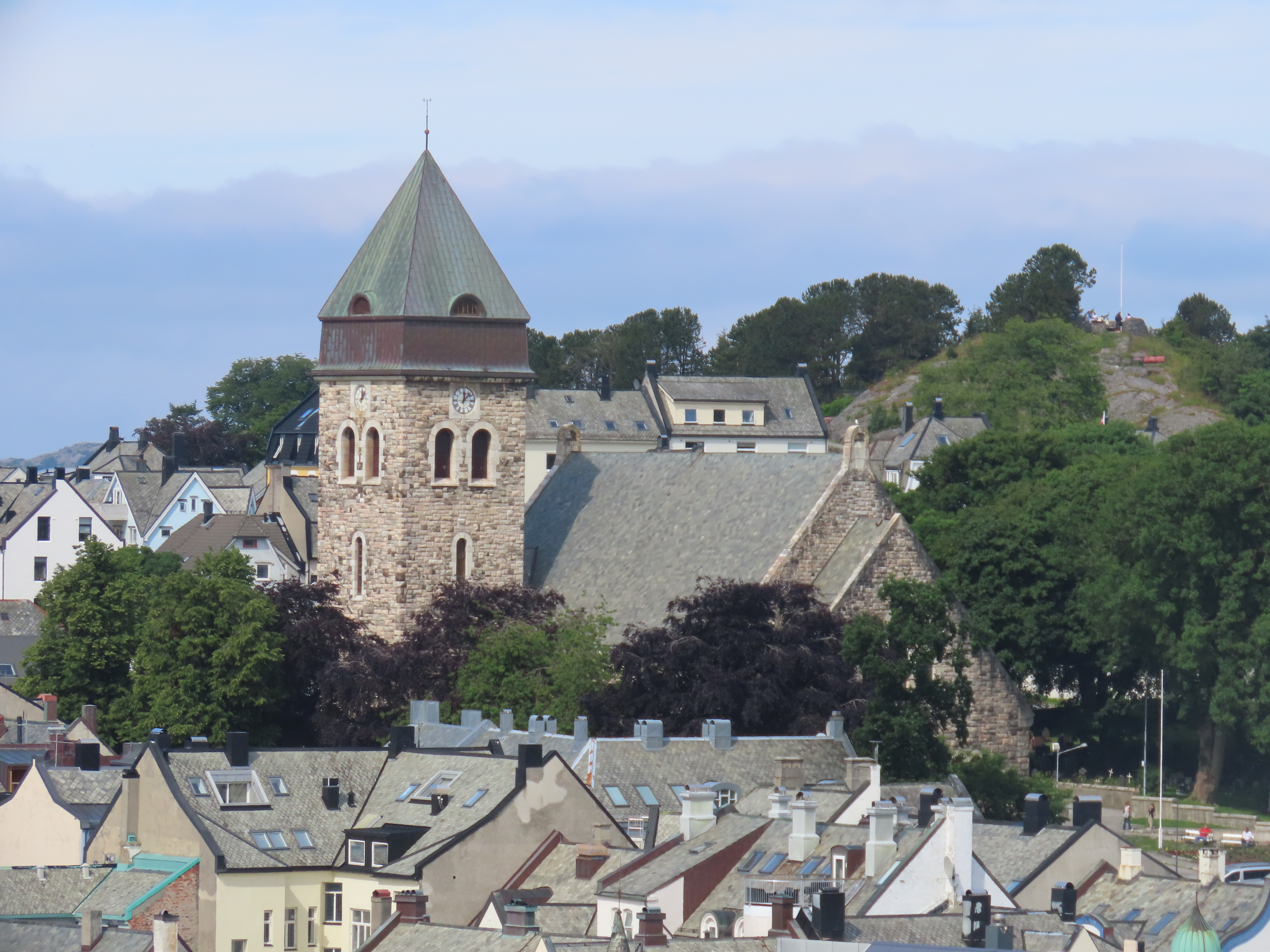

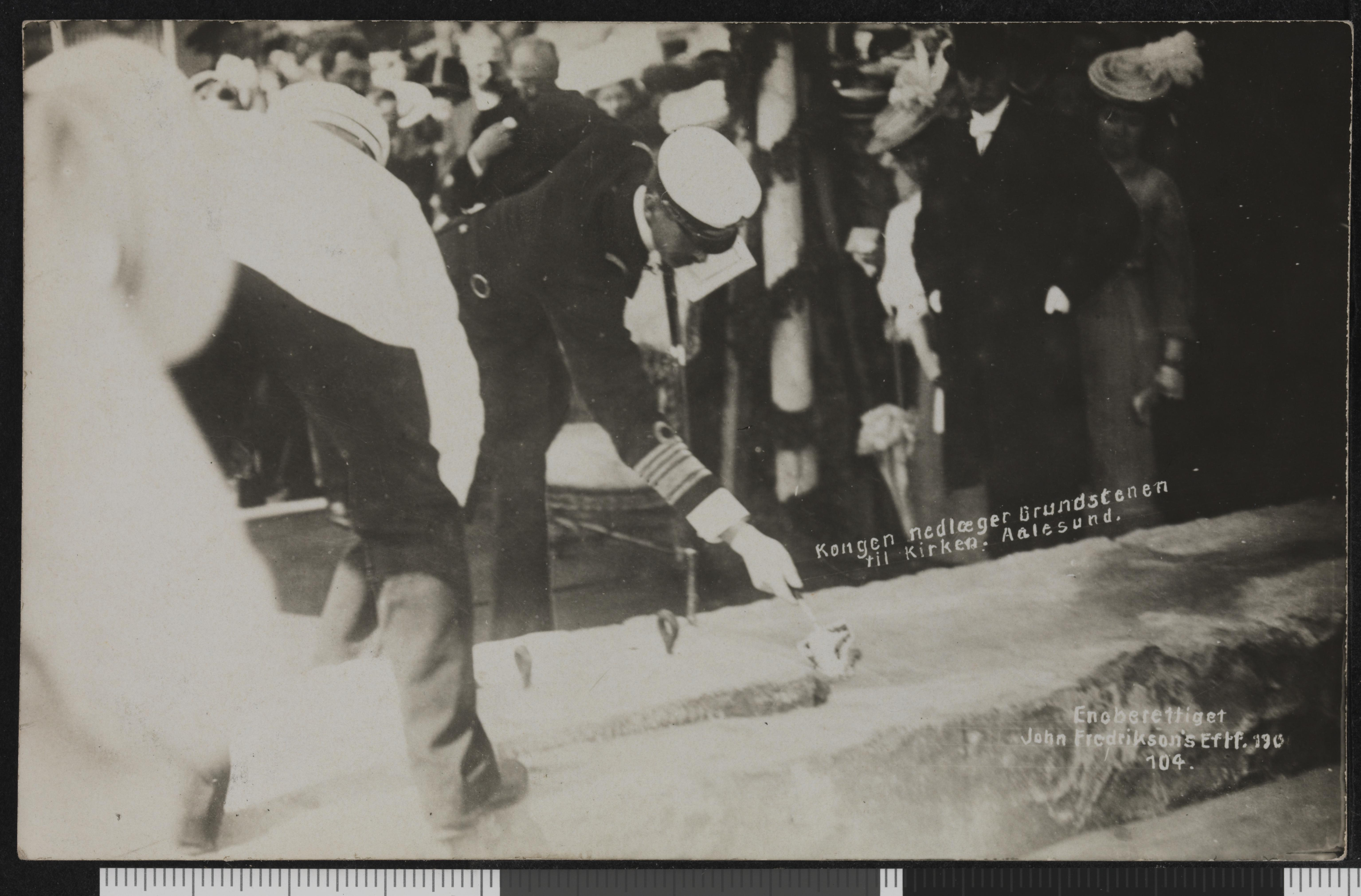
King Haakon VII laying the foundation stone

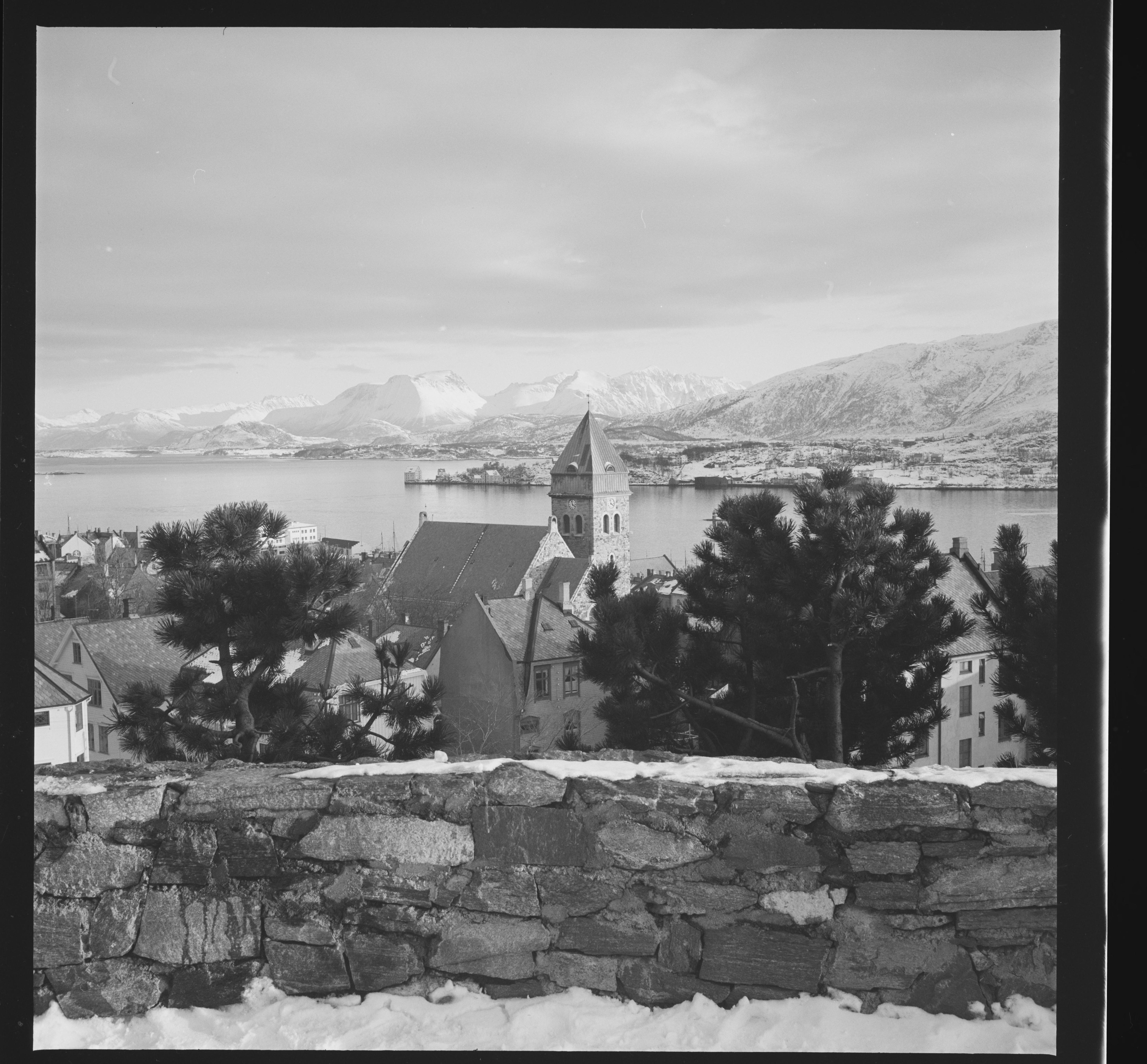

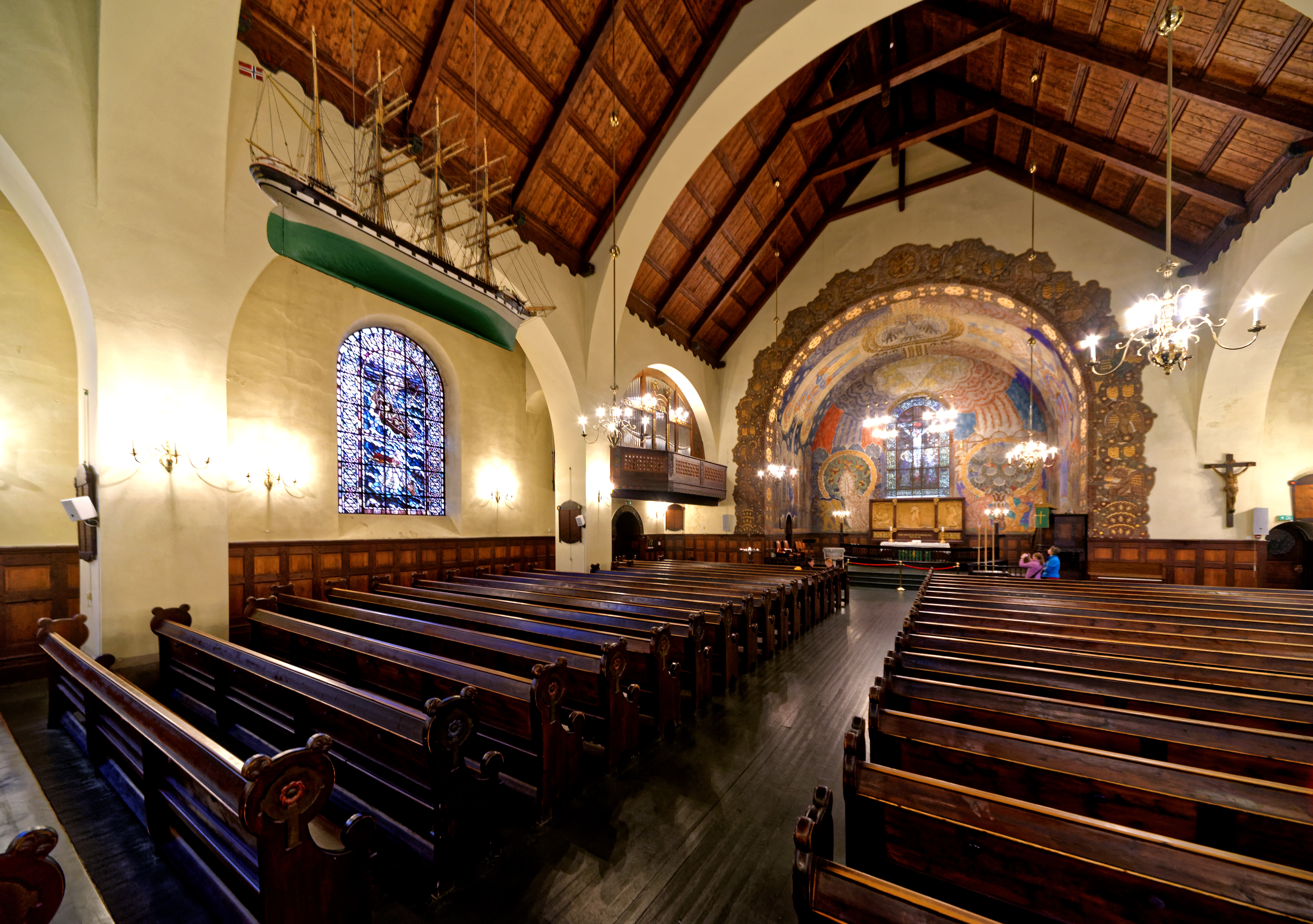

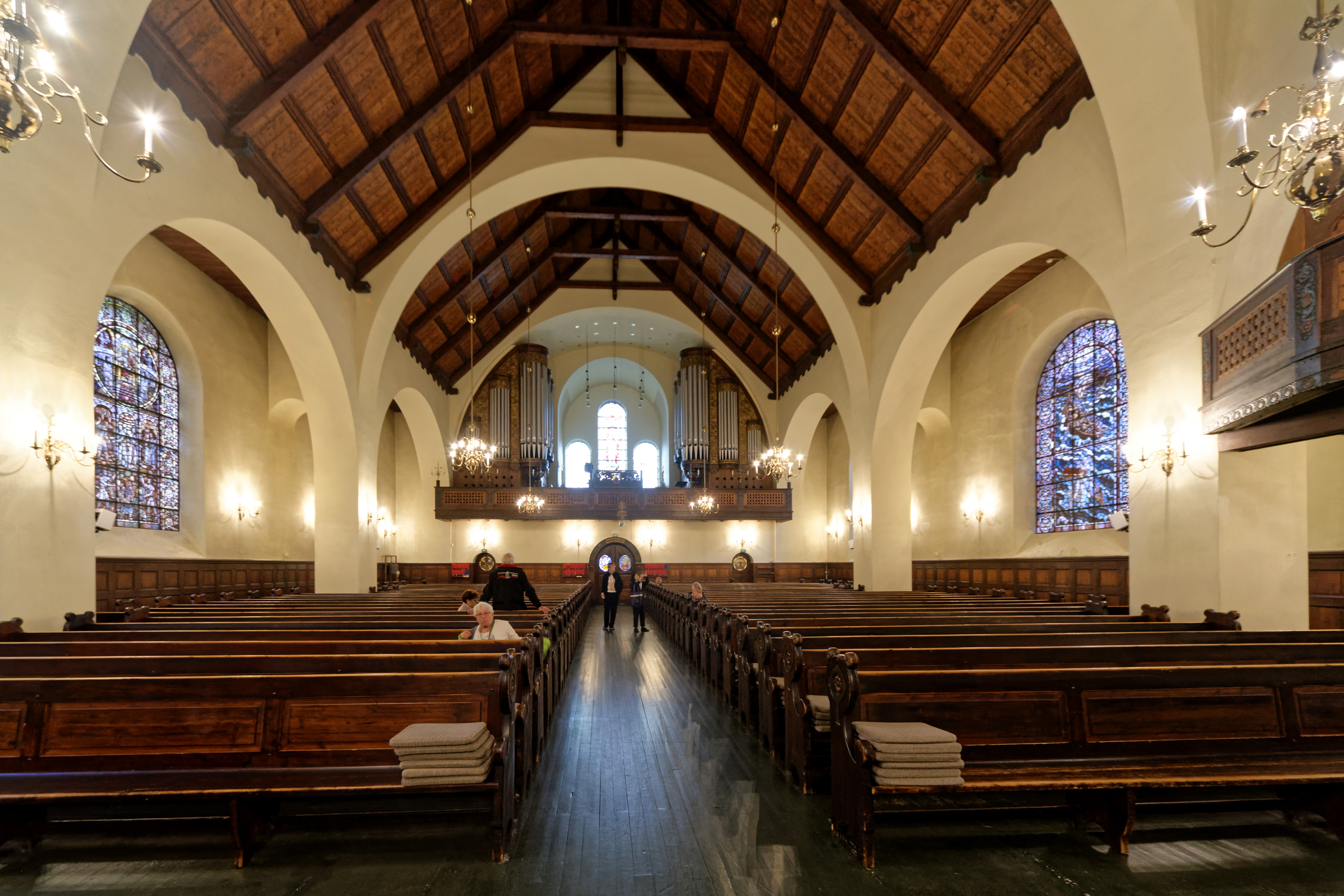

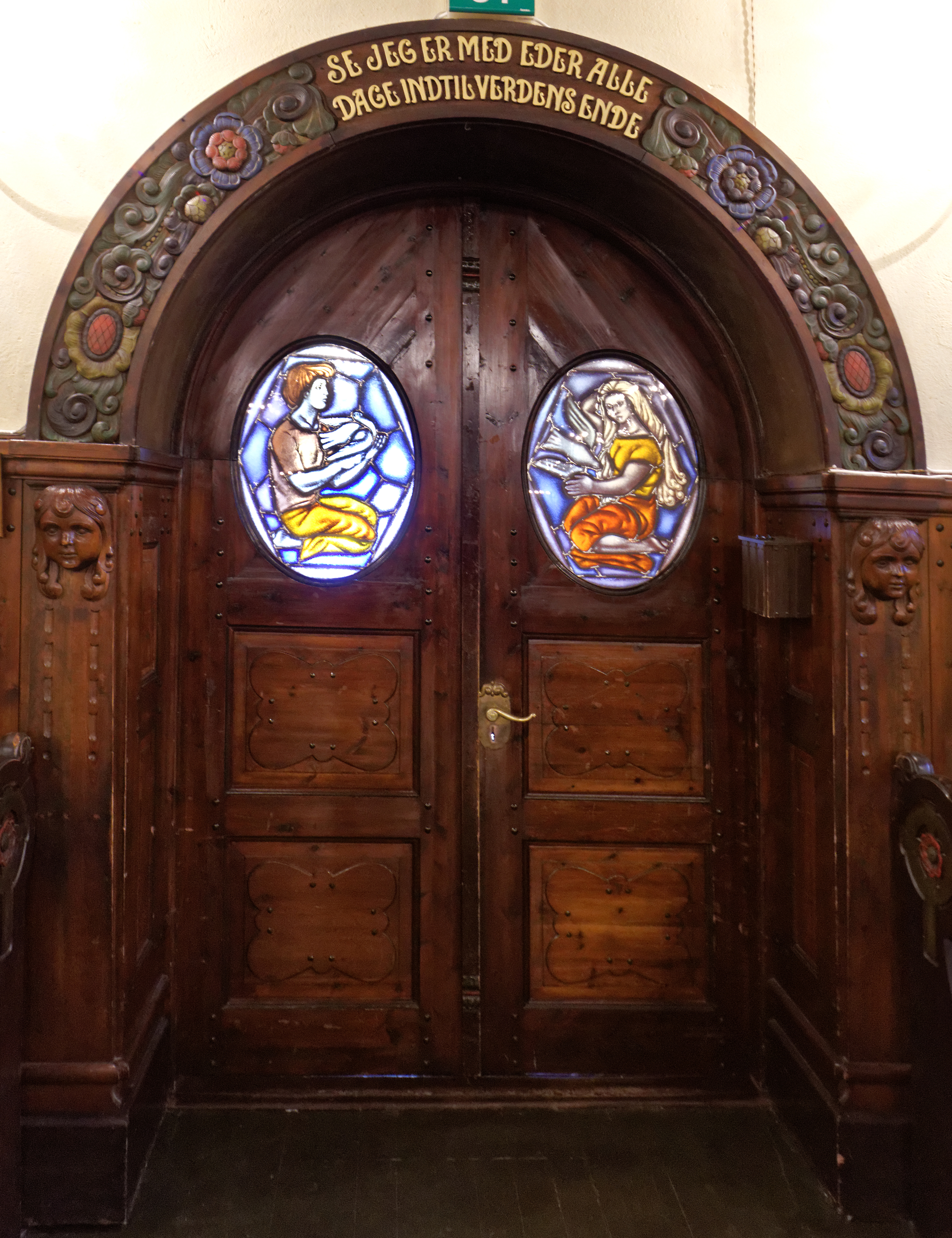

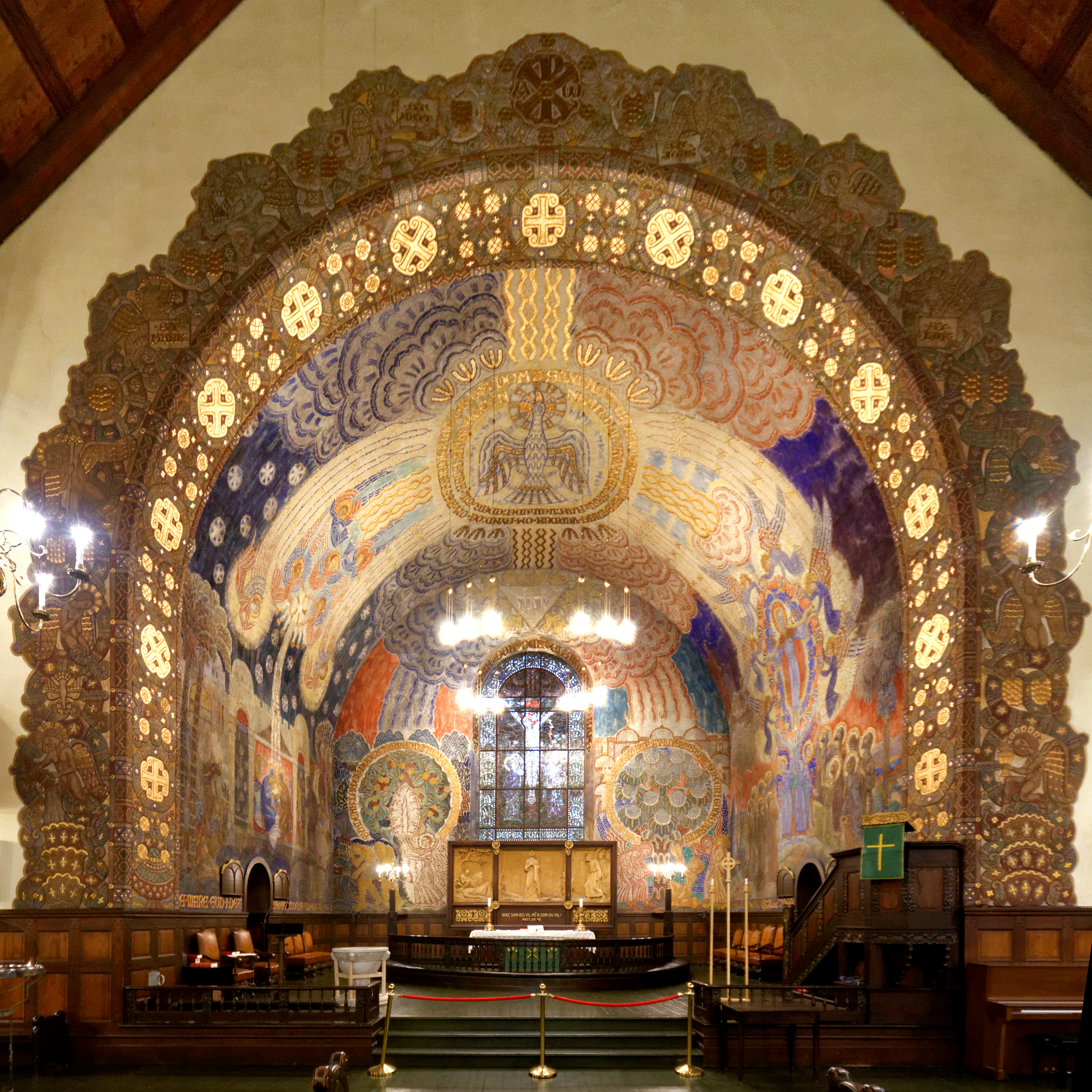

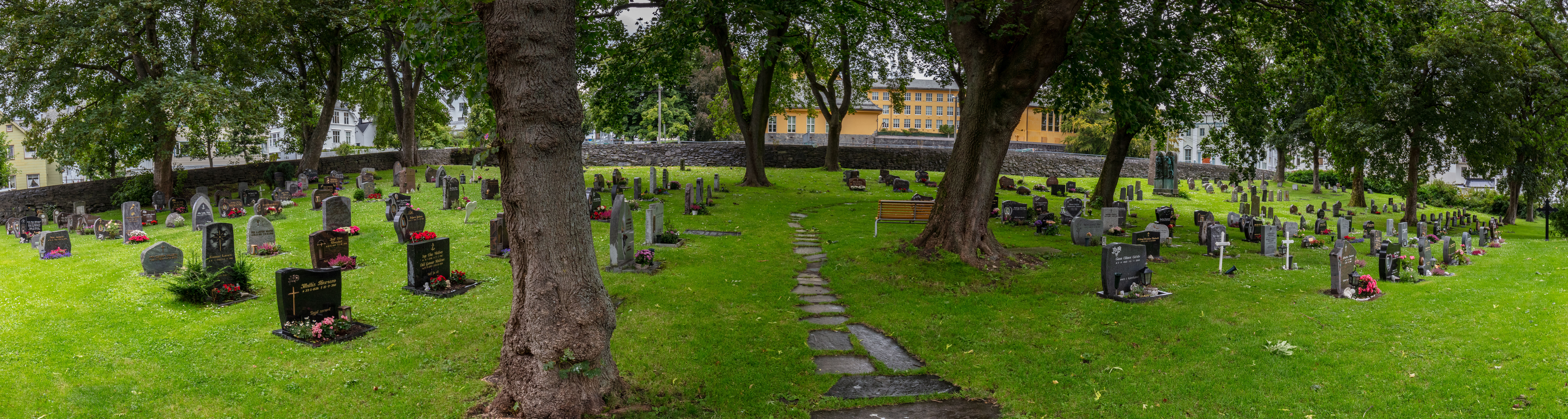
Cemetery

== See also ==
- List of churches in Møre
