= Aura (Norway) =

Aura Aurå
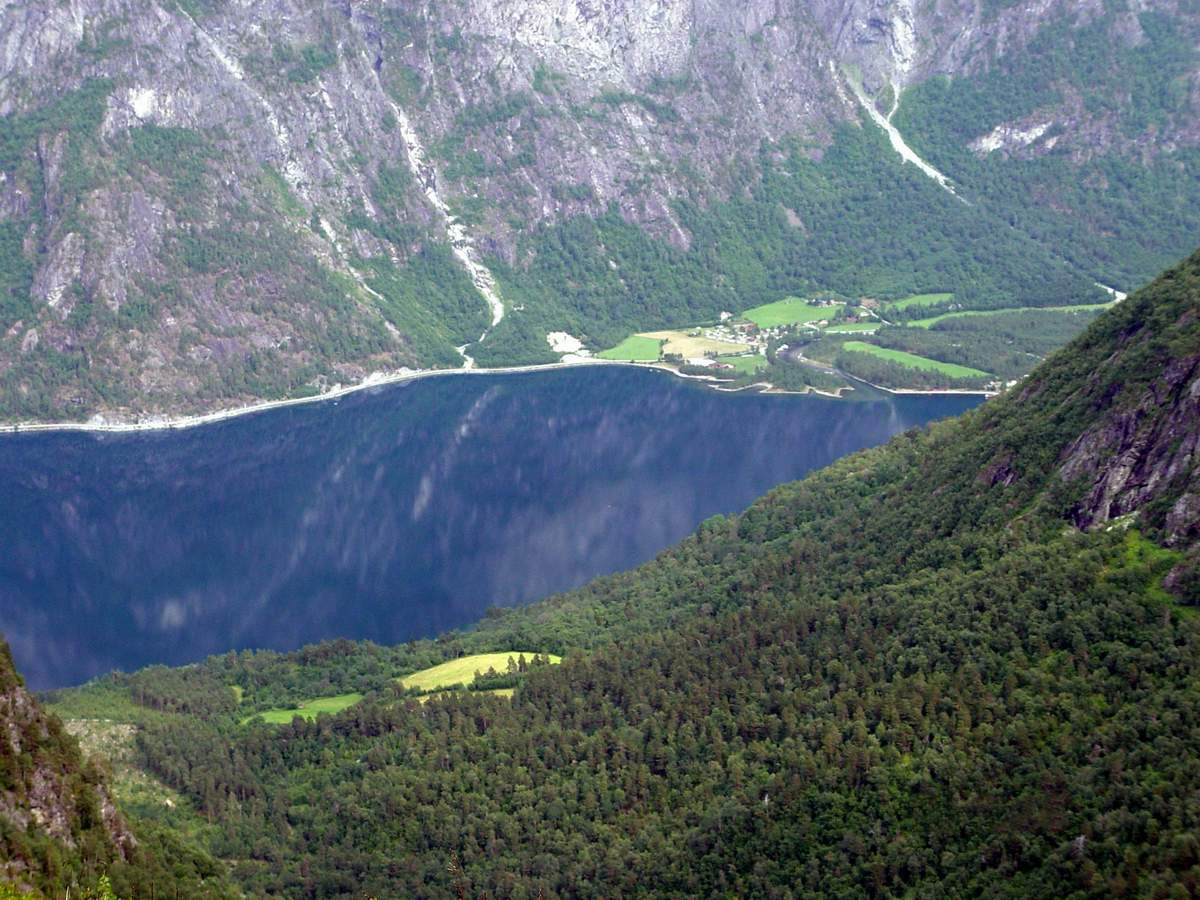
- View of the mouth at the lake Eikesdalsvatnet

Location
- Country: Norway
- County: Møre og Romsdal
- Municipalities: Molde Municipality

Physical characteristics
- Source: Aursjøen
  - location: Romsdalsalpane, Molde Municipality
  - coordinates: 62.40371°N 8.53678°E
  - elevation: 856 metres (2,808 ft)
- Mouth: Eikesdalsvatnet
  - location: Eikesdalen, Molde Municipality
  - coordinates: 62.478695°N 8.172948°E
  - elevation: 22 metres (72 ft)
- Length: 25.3 km (15.7 mi)
- Basin size: 842.43 km^{2} (325.26 sq mi)

The Aura is a river in Molde Municipality in Møre og Romsdal county, Norway. It starts at the lake Aursjøen in the Romsdalsalpane mountains and flows first to the west and then north-west through the village of Eikesdalen before finally emptying into the large lake Eikesdalsvatnet.

The river is 25.3 kilometres (15.7 mi) long and has a catchment area of 842.43 square kilometres (325.26 sq mi). Under natural conditions the river would have an average water flow at the mouth of 27.34 cubic metres per second (966 cu ft/s), but this has been greatly reduced because of power development. In the 1950s, both the main river and most tributaries were transferred to the Aura power plant in Sunndal Municipality.

== See also ==
- List of rivers in Norway
