= Gunnar Randers =

Norwegian physicist

Gunnar Randers (21 April 1914 – 7 February 1992) was a Norwegian physicist. He is known as the principal figure within Norwegian nuclear research after World War II.

He was employed at the Mount Wilson Observatory from 1939 to 1940, and at the Yerkes Observatory from 1940 to 1941. From 1942 to 1945 he was a part of the Technical Committee of the Norwegian High Command, together with scientists such as Svein Rosseland, Leif Tronstad and Helmer Dahl. The Technical Committee is considered as the precursor to the Norwegian Defence Research Establishment, established in 1946. Randers worked a few years at the Norwegian Defence Research Establishment, but in 1948 he was hired at the newly established Institute for Energy Technology. Together with Odd Dahl he was a leading force in building the nuclear reactor there. From 1968 to 1973 he was NATO Assistant Secretary General for Scientific Affairs, appointed with ambassadorial rank.

From 1975 to 1980 he was the CEO of the company Scandpower.

In 1981, Randers became a founding member of the World Cultural Council.

He was the father of Jørgen Randers and halfbrother of Arne Randers Heen.
