= Aspøya, Ålesund =

Island in Møre og Romsdal, Norway

Aspøya
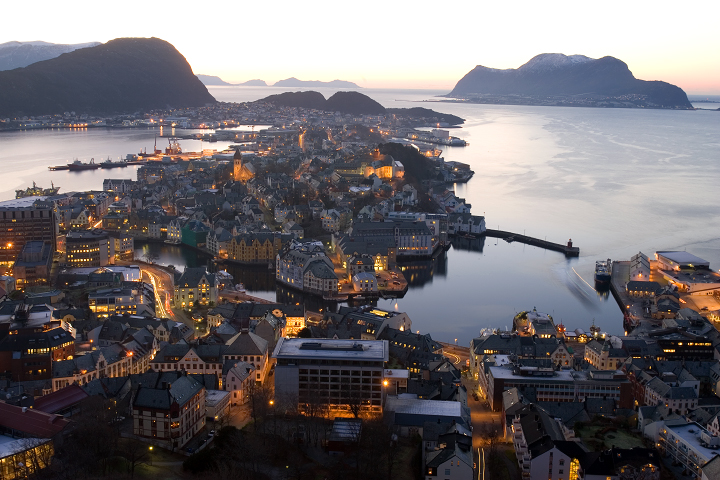
- Ålesund as seen from the hill Aksla. The island in the middle is Aspøya.
- Interactive map of Aspøya

Geography
- Location: Møre og Romsdal, Norway
- Coordinates: 62.472041°N 6.146851°E
- Area: 0.6 km^{2} (0.23 sq mi)
- Length: 1.8 km (1.12 mi)
- Width: 500 m (1600 ft)
- Highest elevation: 52 m (171 ft)
- Highest point: Storhaugen

Administration
- Norway
- County: Møre og Romsdal
- Municipality: Ålesund Municipality

Demographics
- Population: 3376 (2015)

Aspøya is an island in Ålesund Municipality in Møre og Romsdal county, Norway. The 0.6-square-kilometre (0.23 sq mi) island is one of the islands on which the city of Ålesund is built. The other islands are Hessa (to the west) and Nørve (to the east). Aspøya is the location of the 1904 Ålesund Fire.

The small island has some residential development around Ålesund Church. Other than that, most of the island is made up of industrial and commercial developments. The western terminus of the European route E136 highway is on the island of Aspøya. The 0.6-square-kilometre (150-acre) island has a population (2015) of 3,376.

== See also ==
- List of islands of Norway
