= Eikesdal Church =

Church in Mpre og Romsdal, Norway

- Eikesdal kyrkje
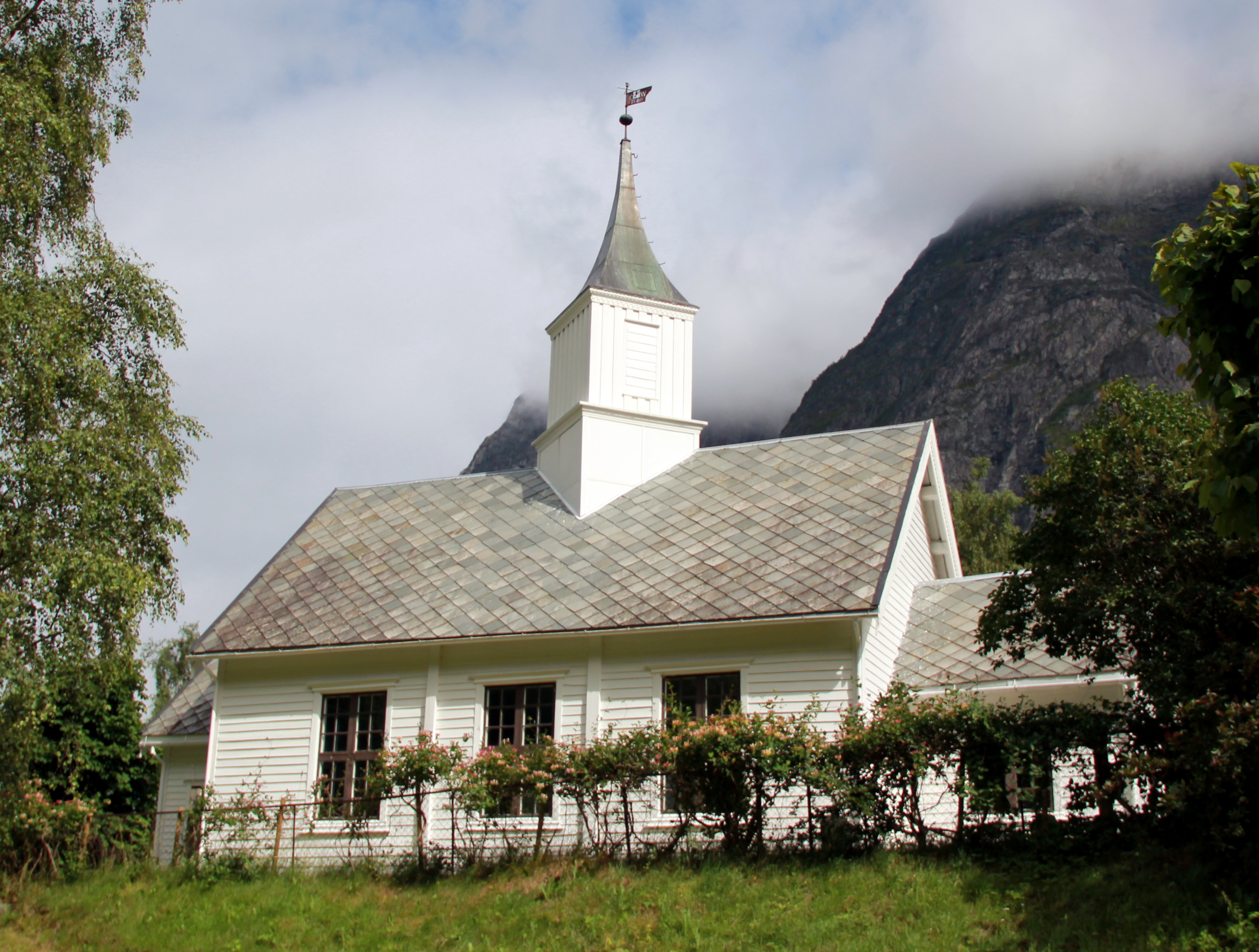
- View of the church
- Eikesdal Church
- 62°28′01″N 8°11′22″E
- Location: Molde Municipality, Møre og Romsdal
- Country: Norway
- Denomination: Church of Norway
- Churchmanship: Evangelical Lutheran

History
- Status: Parish church
- Founded: 1866
- Consecrated: 3 October 1866

Architecture
- Functional status: Active
- Architect: Jacob Wilhelm Nordan
- Architectural type: Long church
- Completed: 1866 (160 years ago)

Specifications
- Capacity: 100
- Materials: Wood

Administration
- Diocese: Møre bispedømme
- Deanery: Molde domprosti
- Parish: Eikesdal
- Norwegian Cultural Heritage Site
- Type: Church
- Status: Not protected
- ID: 84079

Eikesdal Church (Norwegian: Eikesdal kyrkje) is a parish church of the Church of Norway in Molde Municipality in Møre og Romsdal county, Norway. It is located in the village of Eikesdalen. It is the church for the Eikesdal parish which is part of the Molde domprosti (arch-deanery) in the Diocese of Møre. The white, wooden church was built in a long church style in 1866 using plans by the architect Jacob Wilhelm Nordan. The church seats about 100 people.

== History ==
In 1862, the people of the Eikesdalen valley formally requested permission to build a chapel. The municipality council approved the request in 1864 and a royal decree on 31 December 1865, finally gave official approval for the new chapel. The chapel was designed by Jacob Wilhelm Nordan (the exact same plans as Stordalen Chapel in Meråker Municipality). Construction began in April 1866, and the work lasted a few months. The new chapel was consecrated on 3 October 1866.

== Media gallery ==
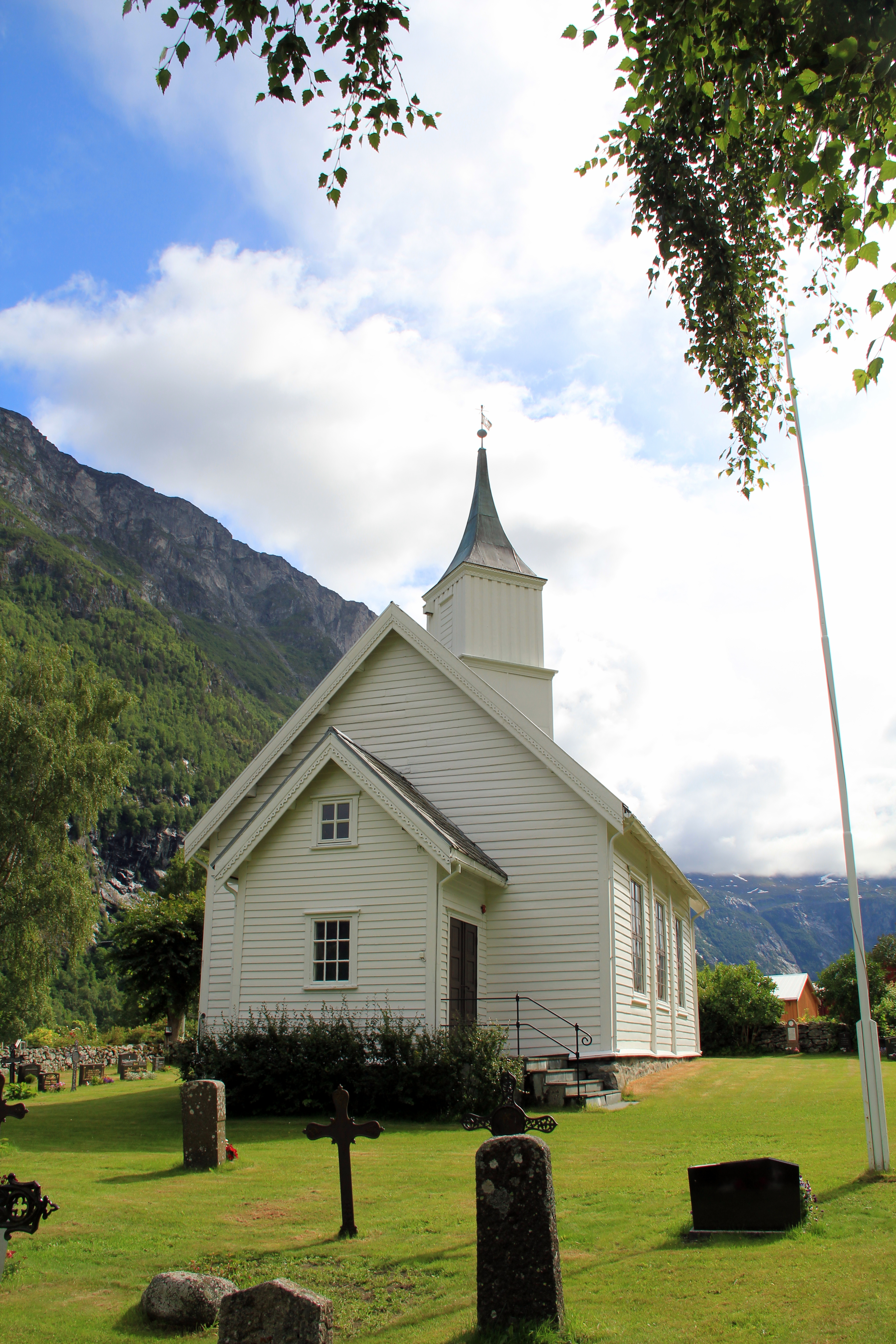

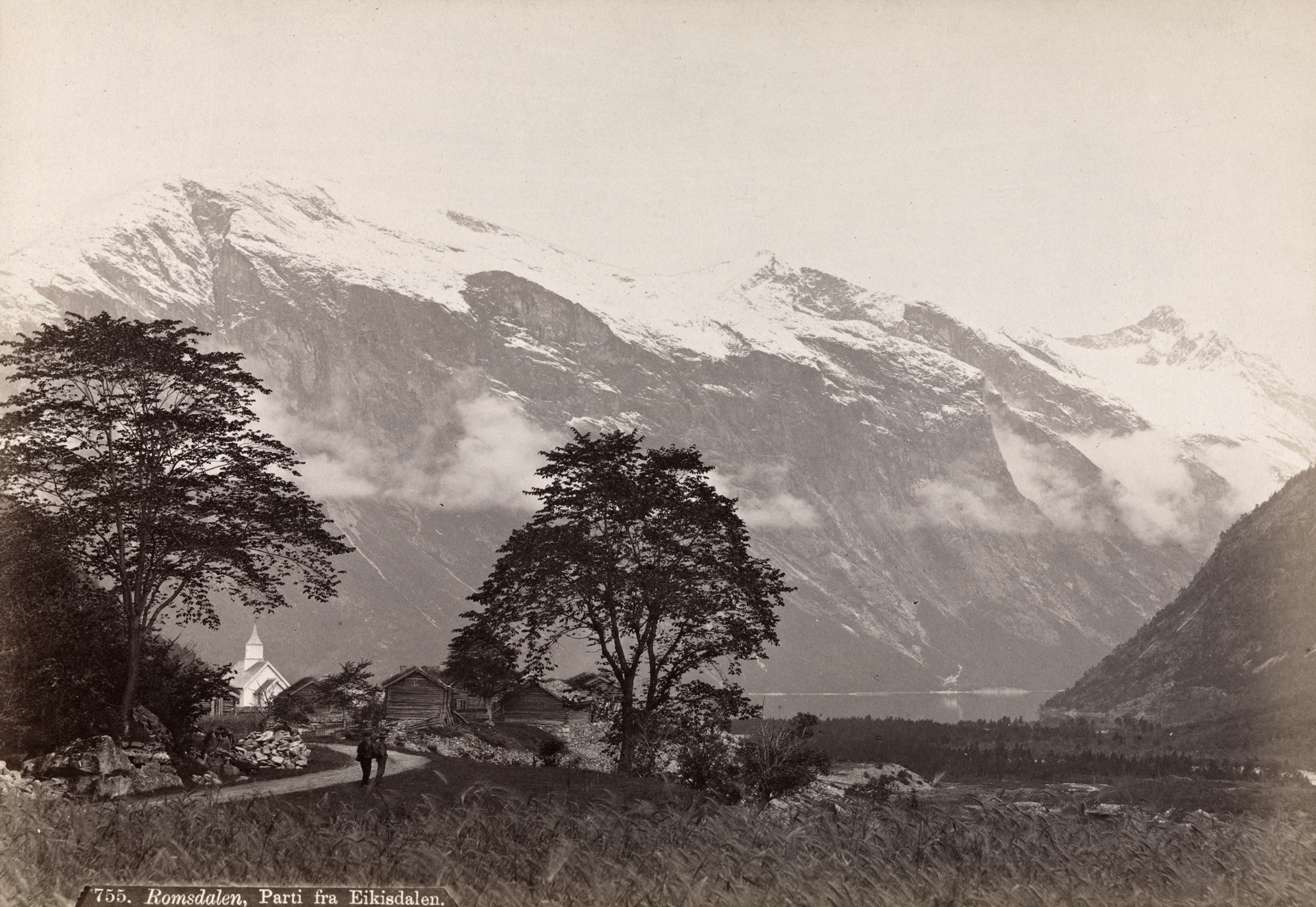

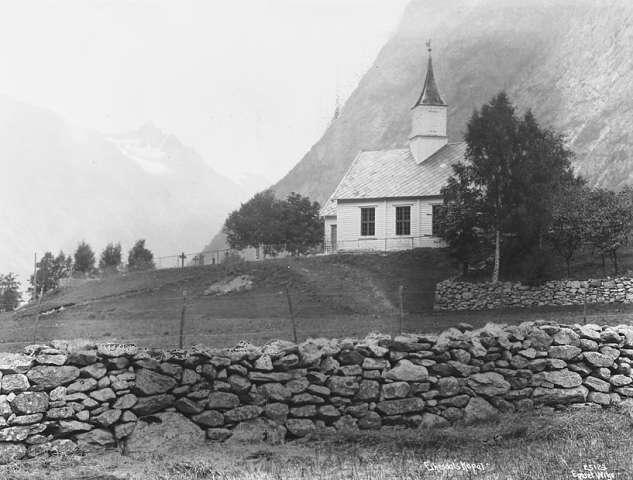

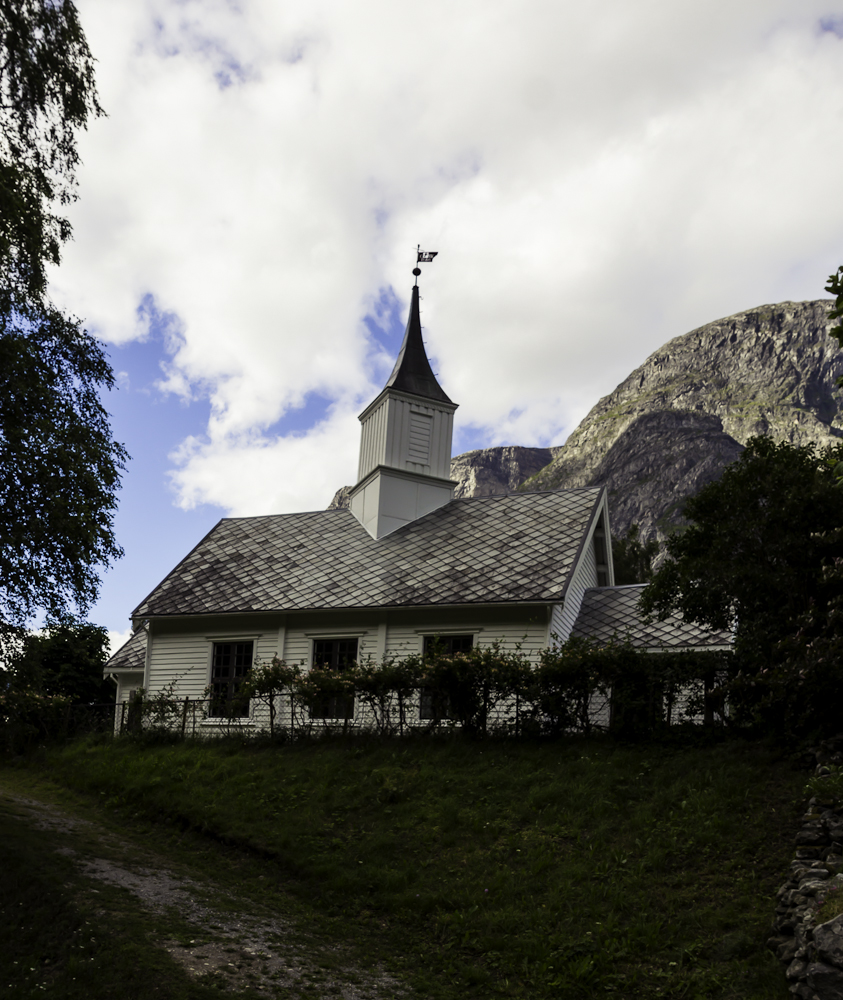

== See also ==
- List of churches in Møre
