= Aursjøen =

Lake in Møre og Romsdal, Norway

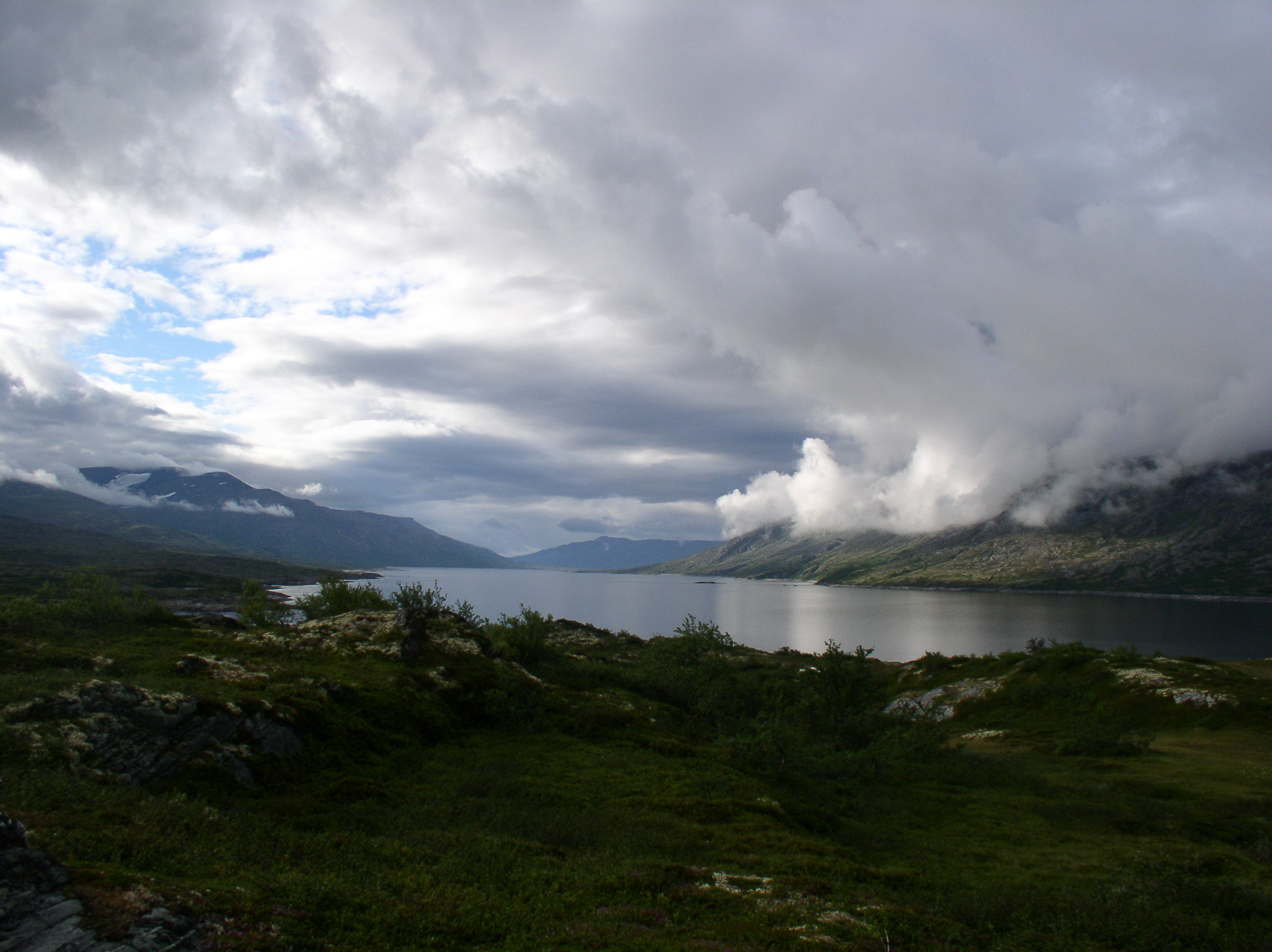
- View of the Aursjøen lake
- Interactive map of the lake
- Location: Møre og Romsdal and Innlandet, Norway
- Coordinates: 62.3622°N 8.6285°E
- Type: partly reservoir and partly natural freshwater lake
- Primary outflows: Aura River
- Basin countries: Norway
- Built: 1953
- Max. length: 23 km (14 mi)
- Max. width: 2 km (1.2 mi)
- Surface area: 36.38 km^{2} (14.05 sq mi)
- Shore length^{1}: 70.67 km (43.91 mi)
- Surface elevation: 856 m (2,808 ft)
- Islands: numerous islets
- References: NVE
- ^{1} Shore length is not a well-defined measure.

Aursjøen is a lake in Norway on the border between Lesja Municipality in Innlandet county and Molde Municipality in Møre og Romsdal county. The 36.38-square-kilometre (14.05 sq mi) lake sits at an elevation of 856 metres (2,808 ft) above sea level and is about 70.67 kilometres (43.91 mi) around.

The lake was dammed up in 1953 to provide water for the Aura power station. It flooded together with the nearby lake Gautsjøen. The water in lake Aursjøen flows out to the river Aura which flows through the Eikesdalen valley and eventually to the lake Eikesdalsvatnet.

== See also ==
- List of lakes in Norway
