= Ålesund fire =

1904 fire which destroyed Ålesund, Norway

Coordinates: 62.4740°N 6.1582°E

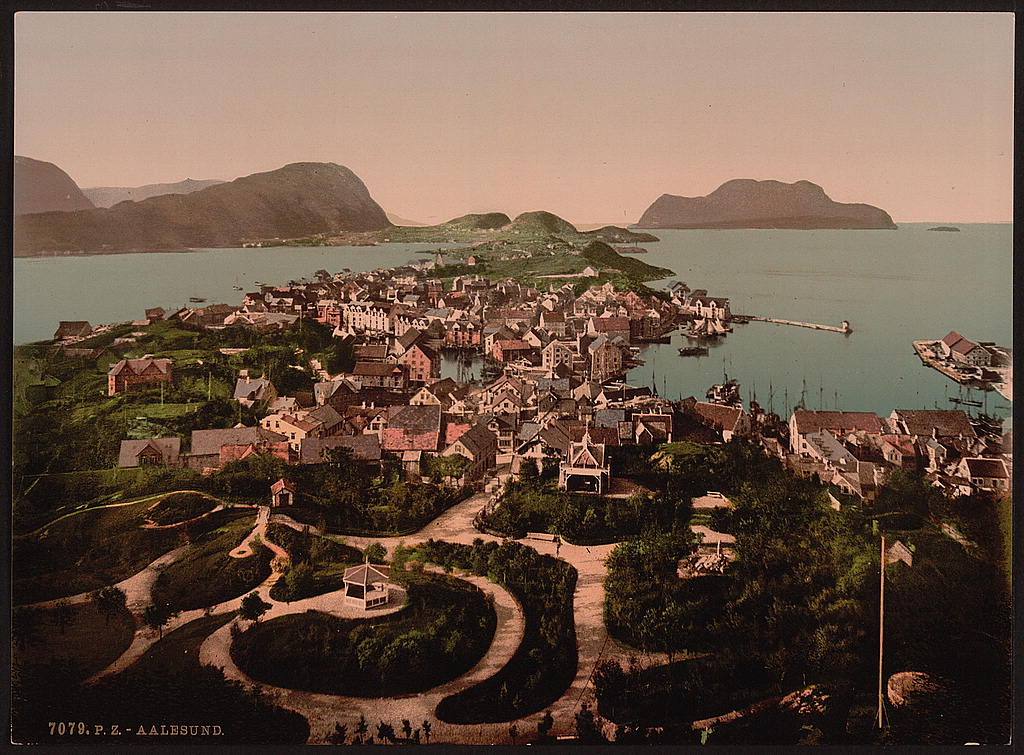
Ålesund in 1900 before the fire. The view is from the east looking west as seen from the local mountain Aksla. The bulk of the island Aspøya can be seen in the foreground; the near channel is demarked by the harbor to the right. The fire began on the island, near the last buildings on the island in the upper left. Note that a west wind would push the fire toward the more densely built up areas. The fire was finally controlled at a point to the left, behind the point from which this picture was taken; most of the buildings seen here were destroyed.

The Ålesund fire happened on 23 January 1904 in the Norwegian city of Ålesund. It destroyed almost the whole city centre, built mostly of wood, like the majority of Norwegian towns at the time. The town has since been rebuilt and it is now the administrative centre of Ålesund Municipality.

== Fire ==
The fire started around 2 am on the island of Aspøya, in the Aalesund Preserving Co.’s factory, which was located where Lower Strand Street 39 (Nedre Strandgate 39) is located today. In spite of valiant efforts at suppression, the wind-driven fire destroyed much of the town. The fire burned to a point just west of what today is called Brusdalshagen, going at least as far as Borgundvegen 39. The last and easternmost house which burned stood where Borgundvegen 37 stands today. In total, the fire destroyed nearly 850 houses, leaving approximately 230 houses remaining within the town borders. There was only one fatality from the fire.

=== Initial alarm ===
At 2:15 AM on Saturday, 23 January 1904, the initial alarm was received from a manual pull station. Shortly afterwards the fire watchtower observed an open fire in the lower part of the road Strandgate. Almost simultaneously another manual pull station signal alarm was received from the Kråsbys area. Two fire crews were dispatched immediately.

=== Initial response ===
Although fire crews responded immediately the sky brightened rapidly in the direction of the Aalesund Preserving Co.’s factory. The weather was unfavorable; a strong gale blew out of the southwest. When the fire engines proceeded through the lower part of the Strandgate to the fire, they encountered heavy smoke and a rain of sparks, such that the horses panicked and had to be blindfolded and led to the fire.

When the fire engines arrived on the scene, they found the Aalesund Preserving Co. engulfed in flames and the nearest neighbouring buildings also burning. The two nearest buildings were in flames and before the crew could begin fighting these fires, two more were burning as well.

The storm blew so strongly that people had difficulty standing. The draft caused buildings to burn vehemently generating both radiant heat and windblown sparks which spread the fire. Soon a house on the north side of Stradgate was ignited; a ladder was erected and fire hoses were directed at the fire, but the firefighters were ineffective in slowing the rapidly spreading fire.

=== Expansion of the fire ===
At virtually the same time, sparks spread the fire to other houses on the north side of Strandgate. Another fire engine had arrived but the water demand was high and the pressure was so low that the stream could not reach the top of the houses. More houses in the lower part of the street and eastwards to Aspøgate began to burn. A steam driven fireboat was brought in service in the harbour near the end of Aspøgate. The fire now raged over the entire Strandgate and the area had to be evacuated.

=== Prestegate fire line ===
Attempts were made to build a Prestegate fire break by tearing down buildings. Almost immediately thereafter the alarm was raised because the fire had spread to Rasmussen’s place in the Kirkegate, which lay two blocks further into the city, as well as at the Latin school. Fire fighting on the lower Strandgate could no longer be sustained; the steam driven fireboat had to fall back to a new line on the Langeberggate. There it came into action and was able to power four strong fire suppression steams.

=== Langeberggate fire line ===
Meanwhile, fires had broken out on Tellesbøegård in the Langeberggate. The blocks around the Prestegate were given up as lost. The fire chief chose to concentrate his forces on holding the line at Murgård. With the combined efforts of the fire engines and fireboat, the fires in the Tellesbøegård, the Latin school and Rasmussen’s place were extinguished (at least temporarily). But the wind continued strong, lofting sparks and embers, so that the fire line was jumped and houses along the Prestegate began to burn. The heat grew so oppressive that the firemen were forced to retreat or risk their lives.

Shortly thereafter Rønneberg & Sønners pakhus in the Notenesgate, which lay about 500 metres (1,600 ft) away on the other side of the Brosund (open water), was reported to be burning. Fire also recommenced at the Tellesbøegård, at the Latin school and in a house in Øvregate as well as on the roof at Murgård. The fire line on Prestegate had to be abandoned and the fire boat again relocated. Almost immediately, fire was reported at H.W. Friis’s sjøpakhus in Verpingsvik which lies about 1.5 kilometres (0.93 mi) away.

=== Hellegate fire line ===
Although the fire fighters were reinforced by additional help, as the fire spread, manpower was lost since those who arrived first to fight the fire feared for their families safety. Some left the lines to assure their relatives were safely evacuated. The fire lines grew longer and longer, with manpower spread more and more thinly.

An attempt was made to fall back and create a new fire line to halt the fire at Hellegate street. The fire boat was directed to Apotekerbrygg and the fire forces were concentrated there. But before they could begin activity establishing the fire line there, the roofs of houses on the east side of Hellegate caught fire. Further, the crews dispatched to Rønneberg’s warehouse were unsuccessful in extinguishing that fire. It became clear the outer town was lost. The fire chief chose to halt the fire with the natural water gap fire line of the Brosund combined with suppression of the Rønneberg’s warehouse fire.

=== Brosund fire line ===
The wind, which had initially blown out of the southwest, was westerly at day break and continued to shift until it blew without abating out of the northwest. This distributed sparks and embers over larger and larger areas and the fire spread with increasing celerity.

== Evacuation ==
The fire started late and spread quickly, leading to a hurried evacuation of people at very short notice into the cold January night. As the fire spread it became clear there was little local shelter to be had and the population of over 10,000 was forced to seek shelter elsewhere. A fortunate few were able to flee by boat. The old and the sick were loaded on wagons and carts, but most fled on foot with only what they could carry.

Most fled along Volsdalsvegen (today named Borgundvegen), proceeding to Volsdalen and Nørve. Others took the path on the north side of Aksla, which also led to safety Volsdalen. The regional governor Alexander Kielland, reported that over two hundred people spent the night after the fire in Borgund Church.

Only one person was known to die. That was an old lady who went back into her house to get her purse.

== Reconstruction ==
Liberal aid was provided to Ålesund both from within Norway and from abroad. Kaiser Wilhelm II had been a frequent visitor to the area and expressed a personal concern for the plight of the population. As a result, much of the international help was from Germany, sent in Kaiser Wilhelm’s name. His first telegram was received while the fire was still being extinguished. He dispatched four ships loaded with personnel, food, medicine, materials for shelters, and equipment.

The town was rebuilt in the then contemporary Jugendstil (Art Nouveau). Modern historians have concluded that the fire was actually positive in terms of city development. The pre-fire city centre was extremely crowded, consisting mostly of old and cramped wood housing with only rudimentary sanitary facilities.
