= Eikesdalen =

Village in Molde Municipality, Norway

Eikesdalen Eikesdal
- Village
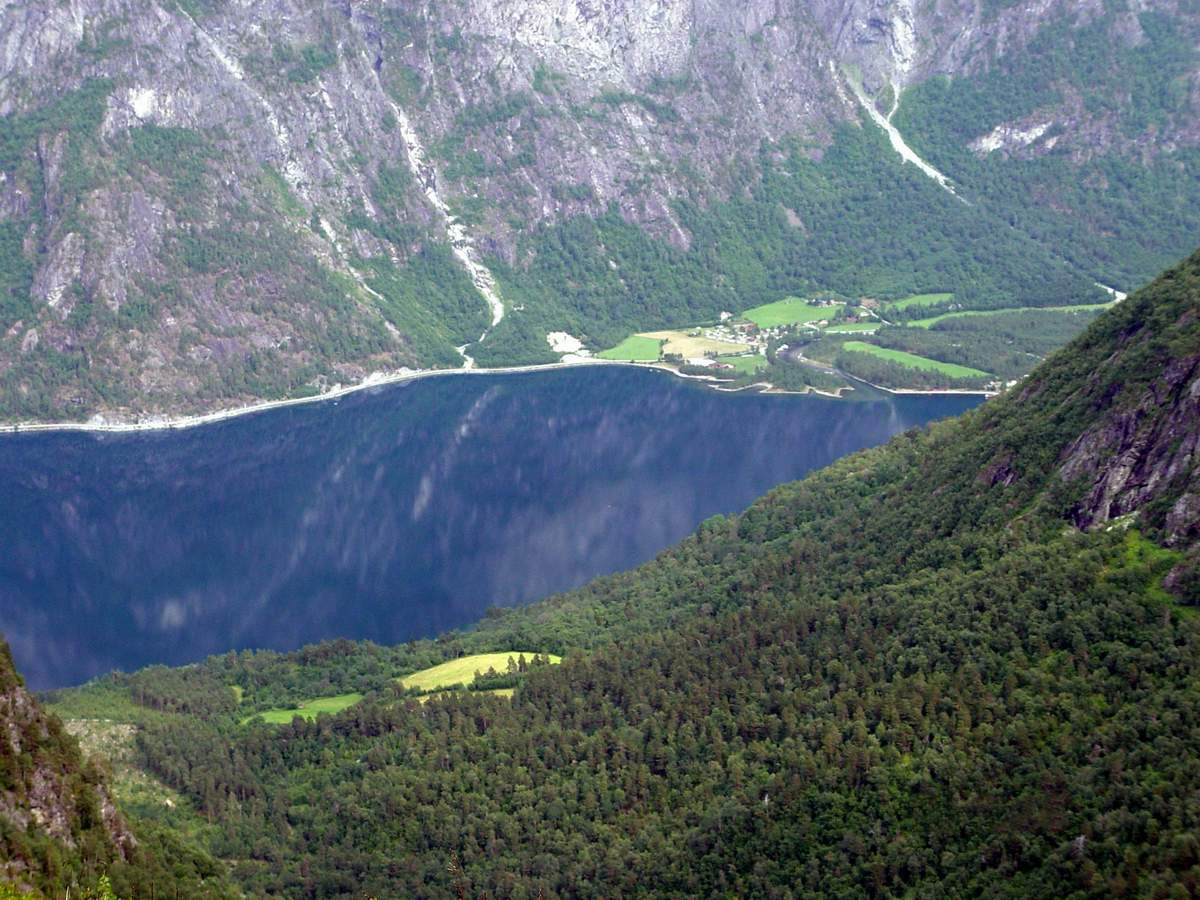
- View of Eikesdalen
- Interactive map of Eikesdalen
- Location within Møre og Romsdal Location within Norway
- Coordinates: 62.4759°N 8.1736°E
- Country: Norway
- Region: Western Norway
- County: Møre og Romsdal
- District: Romsdal
- Municipality: Molde Municipality
- Elevation: 25 m (82 ft)
- Time zone: UTC+01:00 (CET)
  - Summer (DST): UTC+02:00 (CEST)
- Post Code: 6472 Eikesdal

Eikesdalen is a river valley and a small village in Molde Municipality in Møre og Romsdal county, Norway. The river Aura flows through the valley. The village is located at the south end of the lake Eikesdalsvatnet at the mouth of the river Aura.

Most of the valley is filled by the lake and until 1991, taking a ferry across the lake was the only access between north and south of the valley. The Mardalsfossen waterfall lies about 2.5 kilometres (1.6 mi) northwest of the village. Most of the river Aura is diverted to the neighboring Sunndal Municipality and used in the power station there. The village of Eresfjord is located about 25 kilometres (16 mi) north, at the other end of the lake. The lake Aursjøen lies about 20 kilometres (12 mi) southeast of Eikesdalen village. Eikesdal Church is located in this village.
