= Hans Latza =

German SS-Obersturmbannführer

SS-Obersturmbannführer Hans Latza
- Born: 1908
- Died: 1975 (aged 66–67)
- Allegiance: Nazi Germany
- Branch: Schutzstaffel
- Rank: SS-Obersturmbannführer
- Conflicts: World War II

Hans Latza (1908–1975) was a German SS-Obersturmbannführer. He served as SS-judge in Munich from 1939 to 1940, in Prague in 1940, and in Oslo from 1940 to 1945. Latza was the principal judge at SS- und Polizeigerat in Norway. He was responsible for more than 25 death sentences. In the legal purge in Norway after World War II Latza and two co-judges were prosecuted for war crimes for their role when five persons had been sentenced to death in a court-martial reprisal following the assassination of police chief Karl Marthinsen, but Latza was acquitted by the Supreme Court in 1948.
