= Bremnestuva =

Mountain in Trøndelag, Norway

- Bremnestua / Bremnesstuva
- Interactive map of the mountain

Highest point
- Elevation: 74 m (243 ft)
- Coordinates: 63.7454°N 08.6718°E

Geography
- Location: Trøndelag, Norway

Climbing
- Easiest route: Road

Bremnestuva is a small mountain in Frøya Municipality in Trøndelag county, Norway. The 74-metre (243 ft) tall mountain lies on the northwest side of the island of Frøya. There is a road to the top of the mountain where there is a water tank, a mobile telephone tower, and a great view.

Bremnestuva is located about 8 kilometres (5.0 mi) northwest of the municipal center of Sistranda, about 8 kilometres (5.0 mi) northeast of the village of Storhallaren, and about 10 kilometres (6.2 mi) southwest of the village of Svellingen. Bremnestuva is just a few meters lower than the highest point in Frøya Municipality which is the 76-metre (249 ft) tall Besselvassheia.
