= Sula Chapel =

Church in Trøndelag, Norway

- Sula kapell
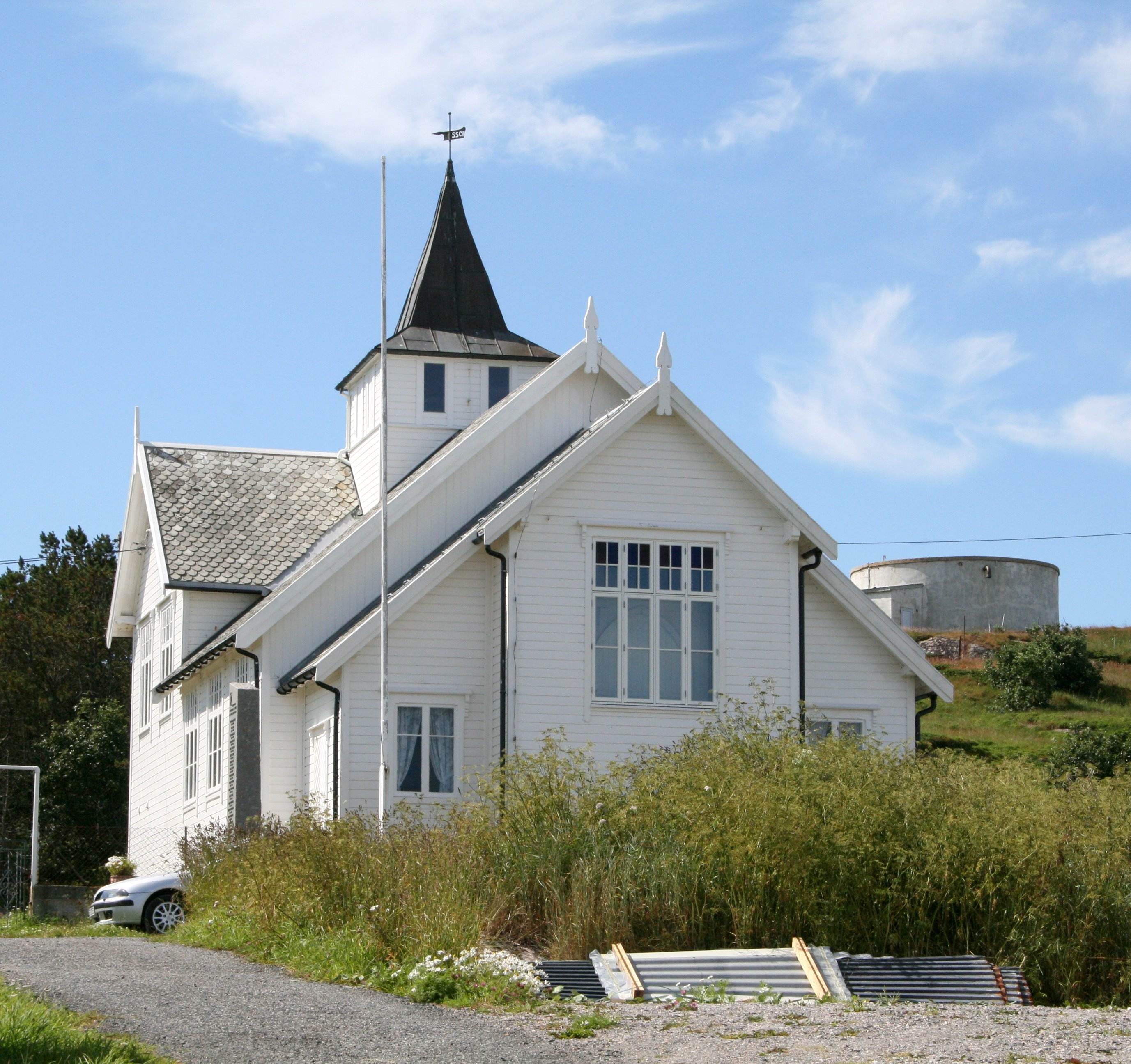
- View of the church
- Sula Chapel
- 63.8469586528°N 08.455889225°E
- Location: Frøya Municipality, Trøndelag
- Country: Norway
- Denomination: Church of Norway
- Churchmanship: Evangelical Lutheran

History
- Status: Parish church
- Founded: 12th-century
- Consecrated: 1925

Architecture
- Functional status: Active
- Architect: Martin Pettersen
- Architectural type: Long church
- Completed: 1925 (101 years ago)
- Closed: 1755-1925

Specifications
- Capacity: 200
- Materials: Wood

Administration
- Diocese: Nidaros bispedømme
- Deanery: Orkdal prosti
- Parish: Frøya
- Norwegian Cultural Heritage Site
- Type: Church
- Status: Not protected
- ID: 84995

Sula Chapel (Norwegian: Sula kapell) is a parish church of the Church of Norway in Frøya Municipality in Trøndelag county, Norway. It is located on the island of Sula. It is one of several churches for the Frøya parish which is part of the Orkdal prosti (deanery) in the Diocese of Nidaros. The white, wooden church was built in a long church design in 1925 using plans drawn up by the architect Martin Pettersen. The church seats about 200 people.

== History ==
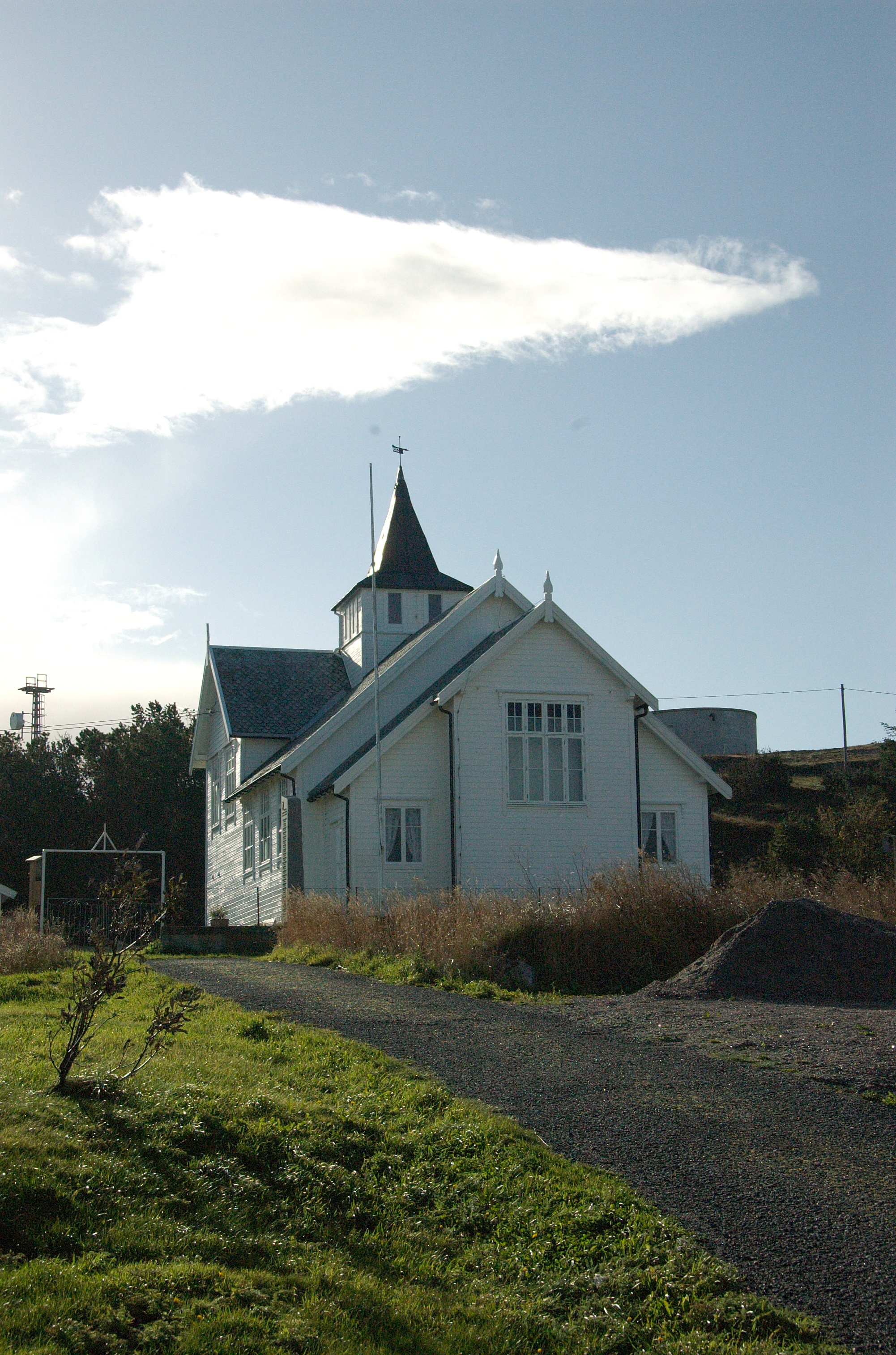
View of the church

The earliest existing historical records of the church date back to the year 1589, but the church was likely first established during the 12th century. The first church on the site was a small, wooden stave church located about 20 metres (66 ft) east of the present church site. The church existed on the island for several centuries. The church originally had few or no windows or tower, but it did have a ljore, an opening in the roof of a building to let smoke out of the fireplace and light in. In 1702, the church underwent extensive renovations including the replacement of windows, rafters, beams, and floors, as well as the tarring of the wooden shingles on the roof.

In 1740, a royal resolution was handed down that approved the closing of the chapel on Sula and moving the church site to Sletten on the northeast shore of the main island of Frøya. It wasn't until 1754 that the church in Sula was dismantled, shipped to Sletten, and then rebuilt on the new site with a long church design and known as Sletta Church. The newly rebuilt church was consecrated on 4 September 1755.

After the old church was moved, the cemetery on the old site remained in use until 1849 when it was closed. Many years later in 1925, a chapel was built on the site of the old church. There was no church here from 1755 until 1925. The chapel was built about 20 metres (66 ft) west of the old church site, just below the Sula Lighthouse. The new building is a wooden long church with a two-story extension on the west end which houses a meeting house on the second floor.

== See also ==
- List of churches in Nidaros
