= Sandstad Church =

Church in Trøndelag, Norway

- Sandstad kirke
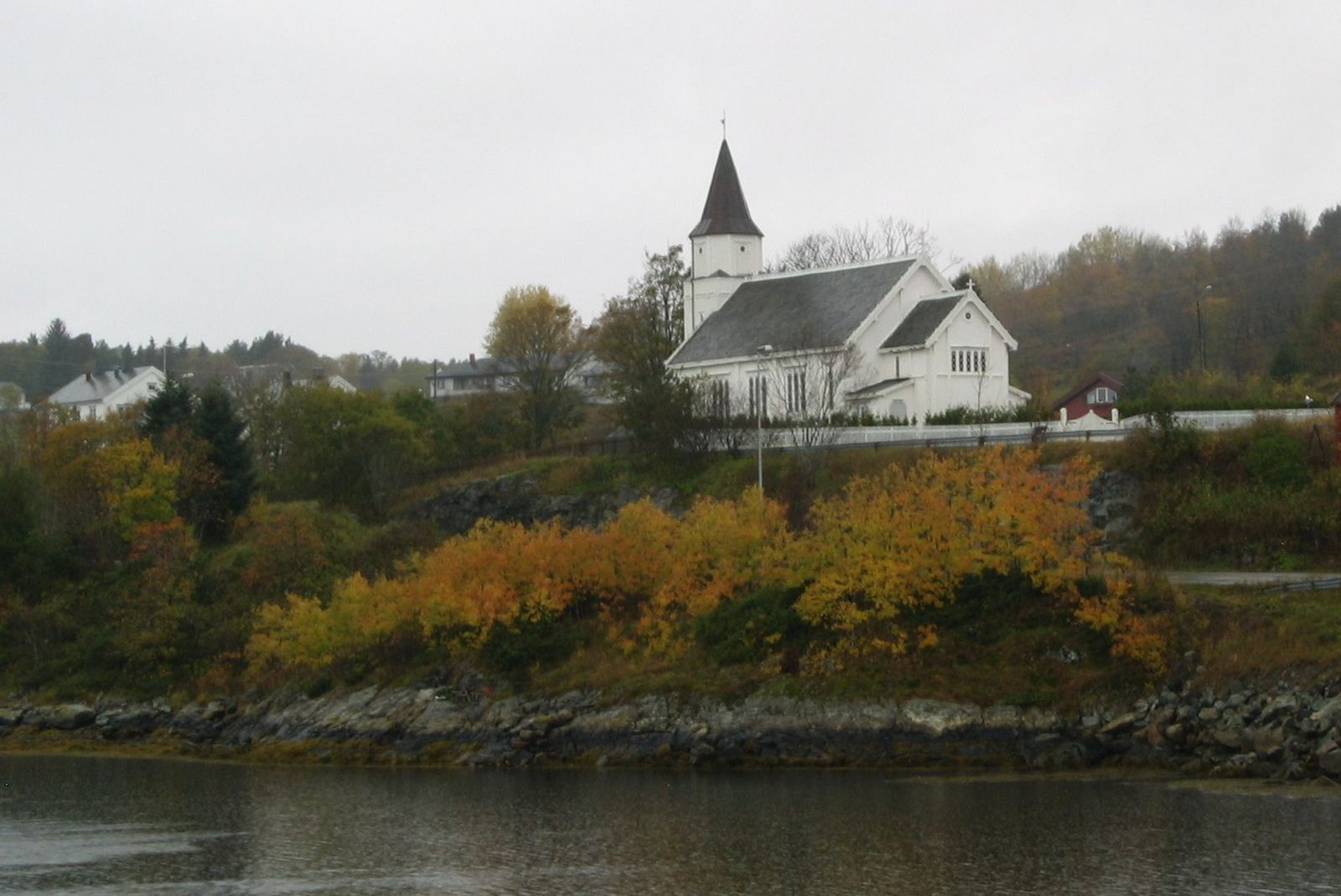
- View of the church
- Sandstad Church
- 63.5228120318°N 09.0990319848°E
- Location: Hitra Municipality, Trøndelag
- Country: Norway
- Denomination: Church of Norway
- Churchmanship: Evangelical Lutheran

History
- Status: Parish church
- Founded: 1888
- Consecrated: 11 July 1888

Architecture
- Functional status: Active
- Architect: J.H. Nissen
- Architectural type: Long church
- Completed: 1888 (138 years ago)

Specifications
- Capacity: 350
- Materials: Wood

Administration
- Diocese: Nidaros bispedømme
- Deanery: Orkdal prosti
- Parish: Kvenvær og Sandstad
- Norwegian Cultural Heritage Site
- Type: Church
- Status: Not protected
- ID: 85390

Sandstad Church (Norwegian: Sandstad kirke) is a parish church of the Church of Norway in Hitra Municipality in Trøndelag county, Norway. It is located in the village of Sandstad on the southeastern coast of the island of Hitra. It is one of the churches for the Kvenvær og Sandstad parish which is part of the Orkdal prosti (deanery) in the Diocese of Nidaros. The white, wooden church was built in a long church design in 1888 using plans drawn up by the architect Henrik Nissen. It was built using the same plans that were used by the nearby Hallaren Church about seven years earlier. The church seats about 350 people.

== History ==
A royal resolution from 7 February 1883, granted permission to build a cemetery in Sandstad. The construction of a chapel in Sandstad was authorized by a royal resolution from the King on 10 June 1887. The annex chapel was consecrated on 11 July 1888 by the Bishop Nils Jacob Laache. Then on 1 January 1890, the chapel was upgraded to being a parish church. There was a major restoration of the building completed in 1954–55. On that occasion, Daniel Skipnes re-decorated the interior of the church. Again in 2012, more work was completed in restoring the exterior of the building, including adding a wheelchair ramp.

== See also ==
- List of churches in Nidaros
