= Sula, Trøndelag =

Island group in Trøndelag, Norway

Sula
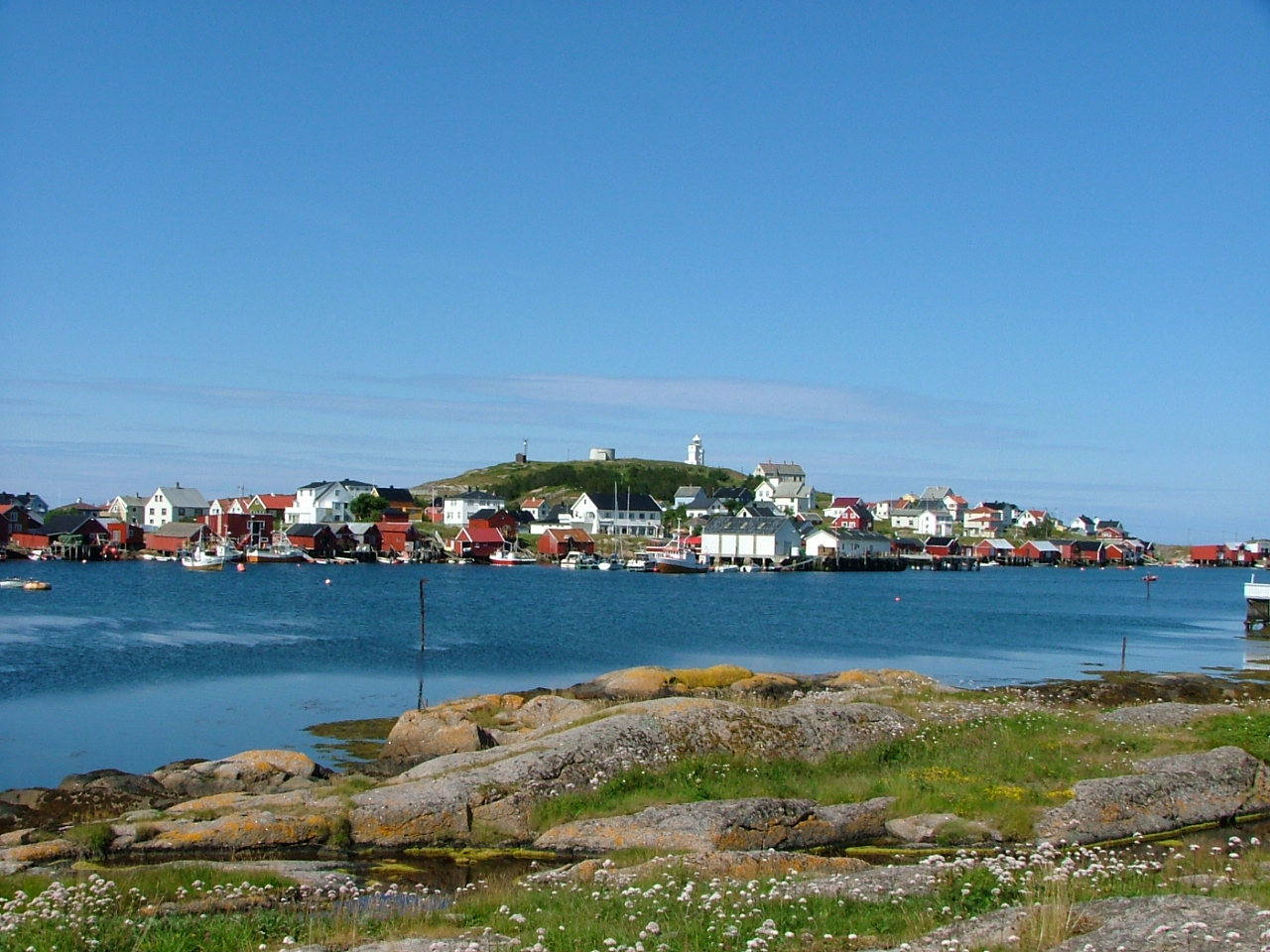
- View of Sula
- Interactive map of Sula

Geography
- Location: Trøndelag, Norway
- Coordinates: 63.8426°N 08.4631°E

Administration
- Norway
- County: Trøndelag
- Municipality: Frøya Municipality

Demographics
- Population: 56 (2017)

Sula (Urban East Norwegian: [ˈsʉ̀ːɽɑ]) is an island group in Frøya Municipality in Trøndelag county, Norway. It is situated approximately 10 kilometres (6.2 mi) west of the island village of Mausund and around 15 kilometres (9.3 mi) northwest of the island of Frøya.

The Sula Lighthouse and Sula Chapel are both located on the main island of Sula. The main village area of Sula spans four adjacent islands, linked by short bridges. A regular ferry service connects Sula to the village of Sistranda and nearby islands. As of 2017, the island group has a population of 56 residents, who predominantly work in the fishing industry including fish processing, and fish farming.

== Climate ==
Climate data for Sula, Frøya 1991-2020 (5 m, extremes 1975-2025)
Month	Jan	Feb	Mar	Apr	May	Jun	Jul	Aug	Sep	Oct	Nov	Dec	Year
Record high °C (°F)	11.7 (53.1)	11.5 (52.7)	13.3 (55.9)	19.3 (66.7)	24.6 (76.3)	27.7 (81.9)	28.5 (83.3)	26.3 (79.3)	22.7 (72.9)	18.8 (65.8)	14.6 (58.3)	11.1 (52.0)	28.5 (83.3)
Mean daily maximum °C (°F)	4.6 (40.3)	4.2 (39.6)	5.2 (41.4)	7.6 (45.7)	10.4 (50.7)	13 (55)	15.6 (60.1)	16.1 (61.0)	13.8 (56.8)	9.8 (49.6)	6.9 (44.4)	5.5 (41.9)	9.4 (48.9)
Daily mean °C (°F)	3.1 (37.6)	2.5 (36.5)	3.2 (37.8)	5.4 (41.7)	8 (46)	10.7 (51.3)	13 (55)	13.7 (56.7)	11.8 (53.2)	8.3 (46.9)	5.5 (41.9)	3.8 (38.8)	7.4 (45.3)
Mean daily minimum °C (°F)	1.2 (34.2)	0.9 (33.6)	1.6 (34.9)	3.5 (38.3)	6 (43)	8.9 (48.0)	11.3 (52.3)	12.2 (54.0)	10.2 (50.4)	6.6 (43.9)	3.7 (38.7)	2.1 (35.8)	5.7 (42.3)
Record low °C (°F)	−12.3 (9.9)	−12.7 (9.1)	−8.1 (17.4)	−3.6 (25.5)	−0.3 (31.5)	2.7 (36.9)	5 (41)	7.1 (44.8)	2 (36)	−1.1 (30.0)	−7 (19)	−10.9 (12.4)	−12.7 (9.1)
Average precipitation mm (inches)	92 (3.6)	75 (3.0)	80 (3.1)	55 (2.2)	46 (1.8)	53 (2.1)	57 (2.2)	74 (2.9)	104 (4.1)	88 (3.5)	108 (4.3)	113 (4.4)	945 (37.2)
Source 1: Norwegian Meteorological Institute
Source 2: NOAA-WMO averages 91-2020 Norway

== See also ==
- List of islands of Norway
