= Mausund =

Village in Frøya Municipality, Norway

- Village
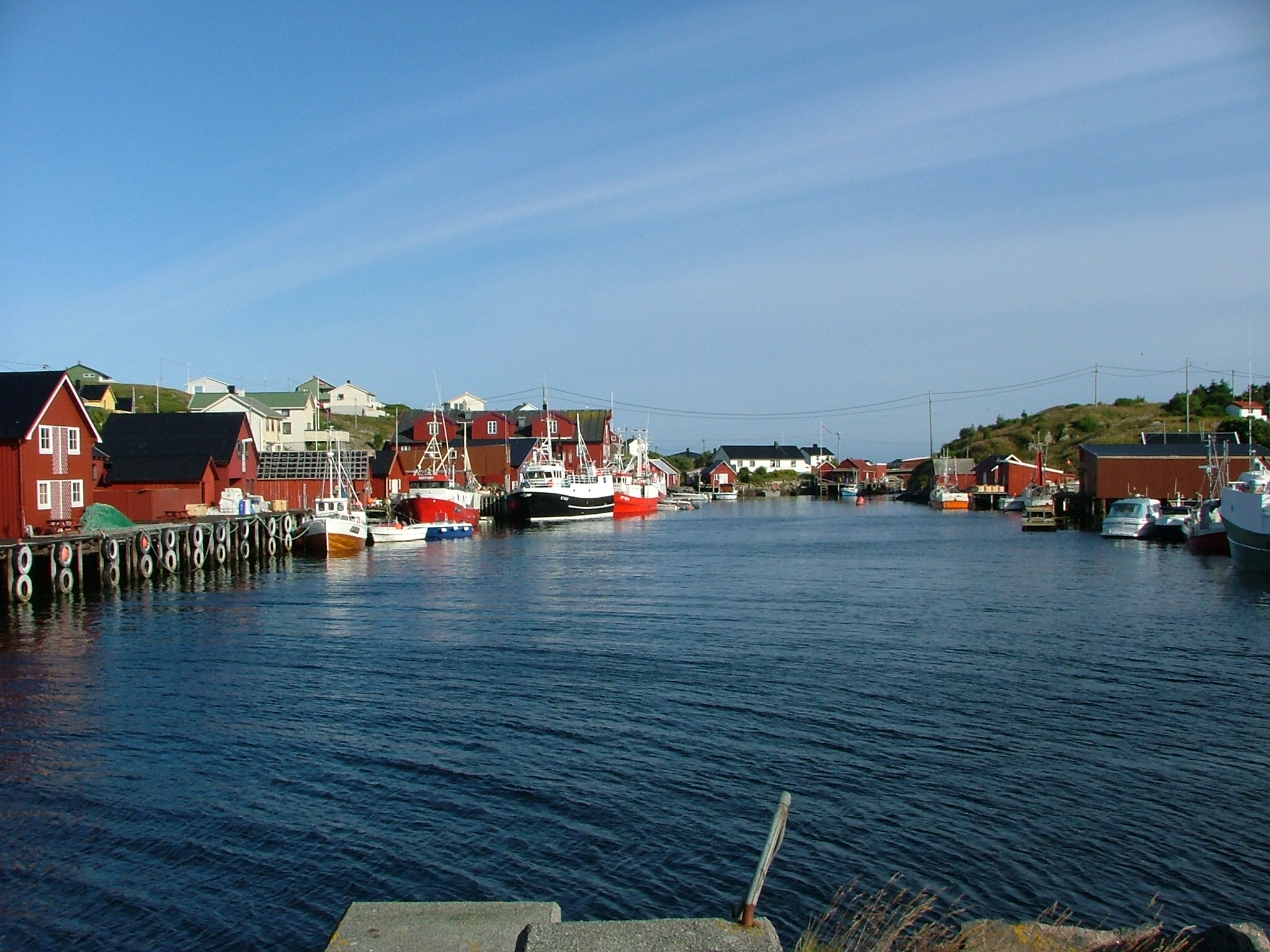
- View of the village
- Interactive map of Mausund
- Location within Trøndelag Location within Norway
- Coordinates: 63.8676°N 08.6637°E
- Country: Norway
- Region: Central Norway
- County: Trøndelag
- District: Fosen
- Municipality: Frøya Municipality
- Elevation: 8 m (26 ft)
- Time zone: UTC+01:00 (CET)
  - Summer (DST): UTC+02:00 (CEST)
- Post Code: 7284 Mausund

Mausund is a small fishing village in Frøya Municipality in Trøndelag county, Norway. The village is located on a small group of islands that are located about 10 kilometres (6.2 mi) northwest of the island of Frøya, roughly between the islands of Sula and Froan. In 2017, there were 177 residents living in Mausund.

The village is located on the small islands of Måøya, Gårdsøya, Geitøya, and Aursøyan, which are all connected by bridges. It is a fishing village with a fish processing plant. The Måøy Chapel is also located here.

== Media gallery ==
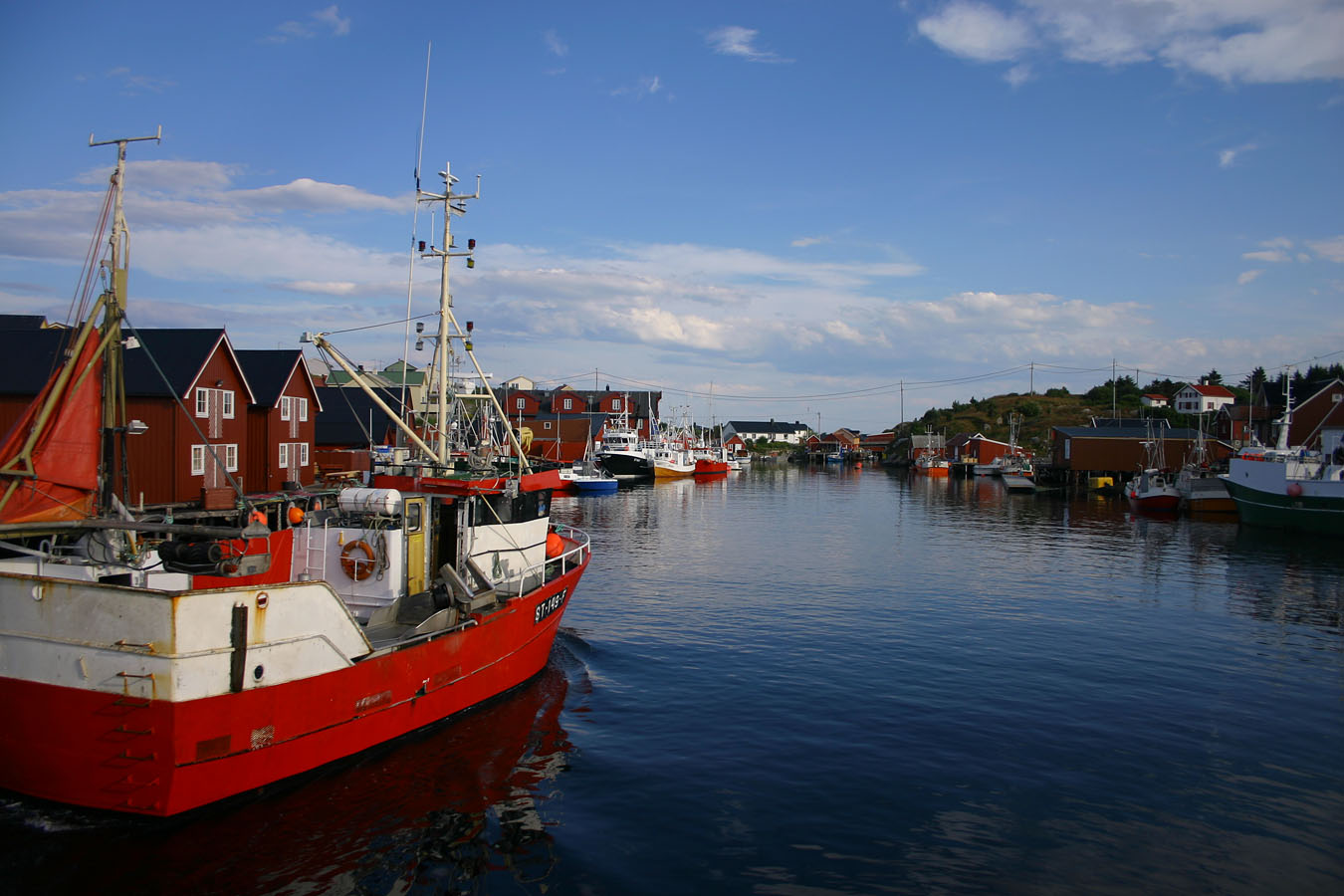

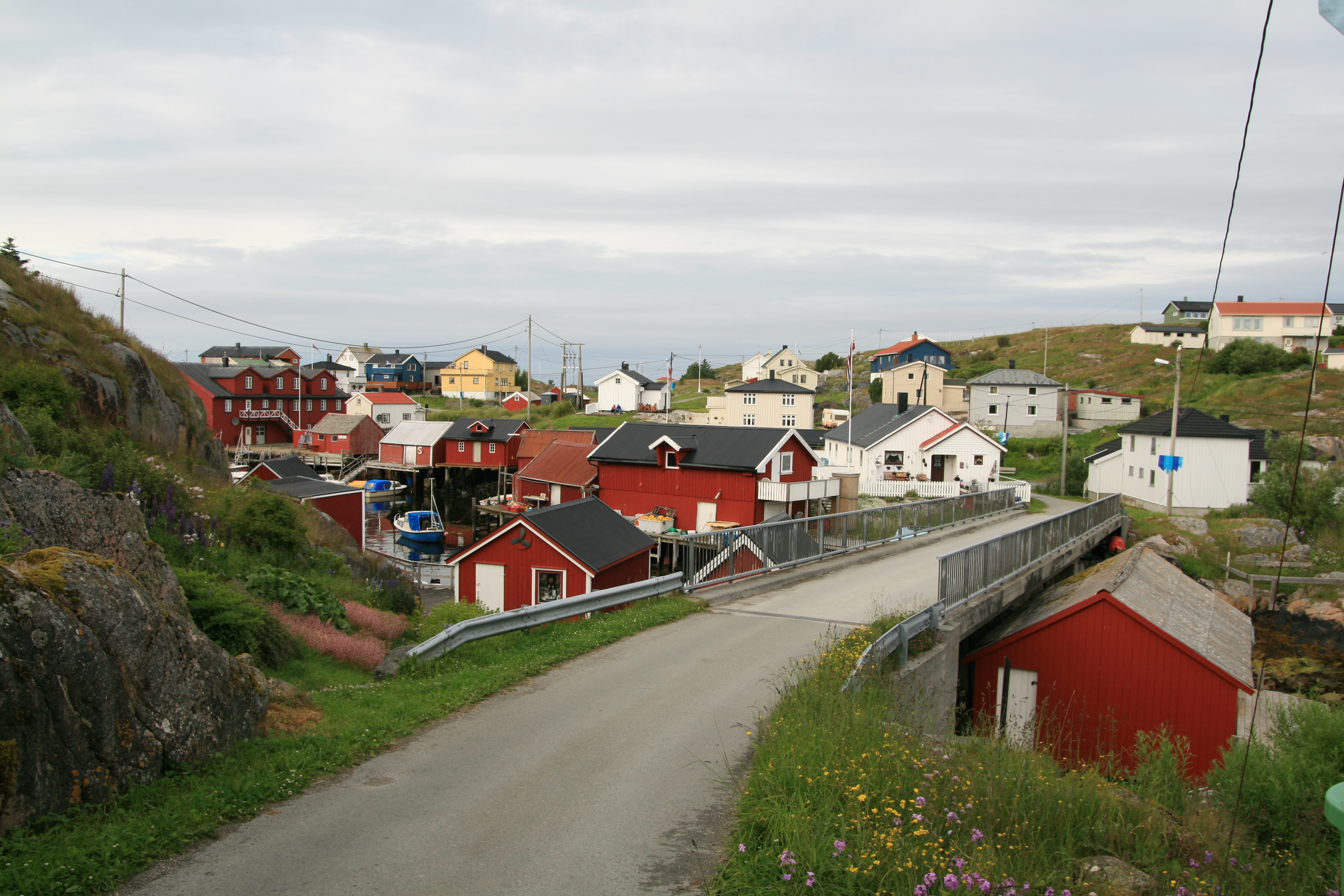

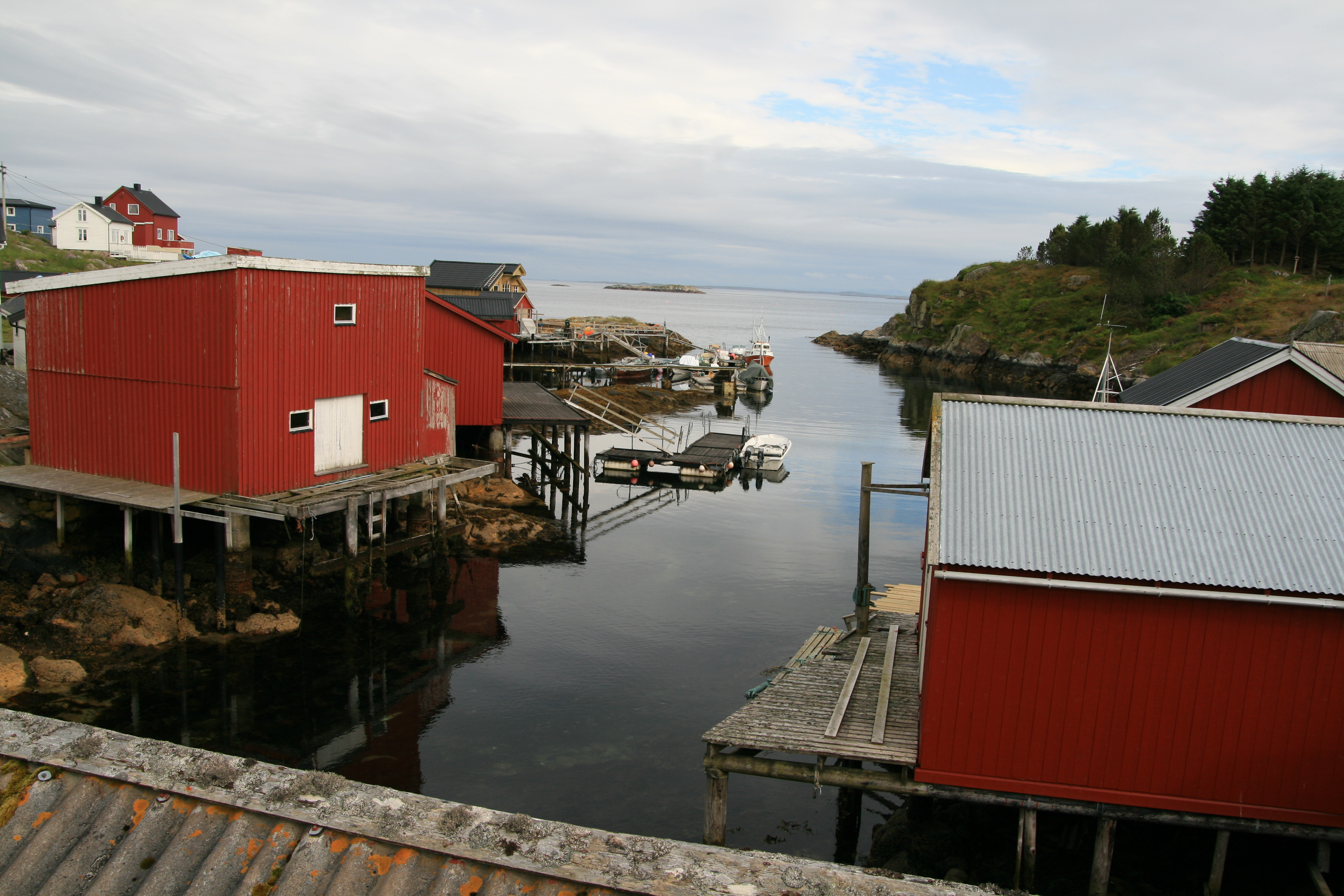

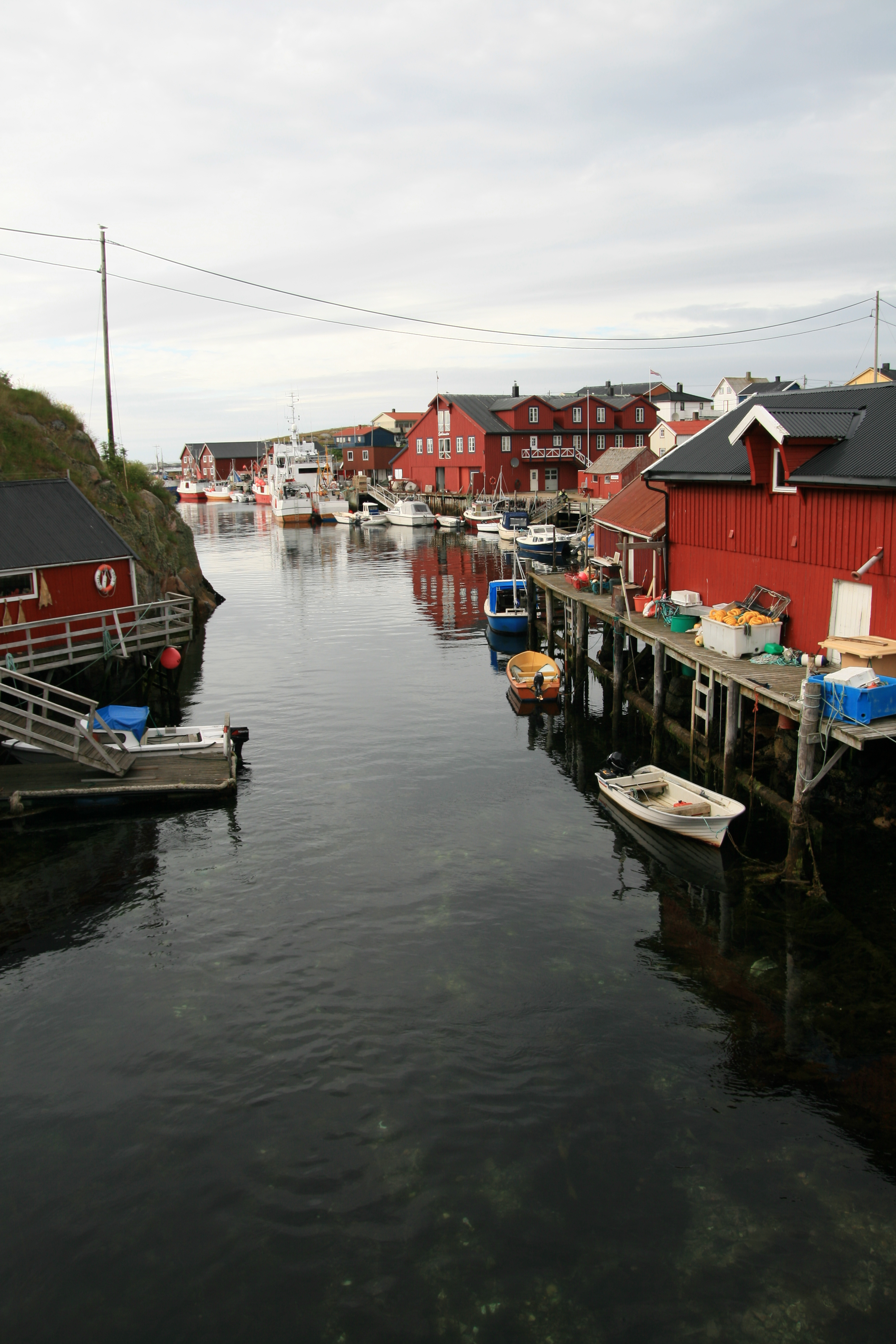

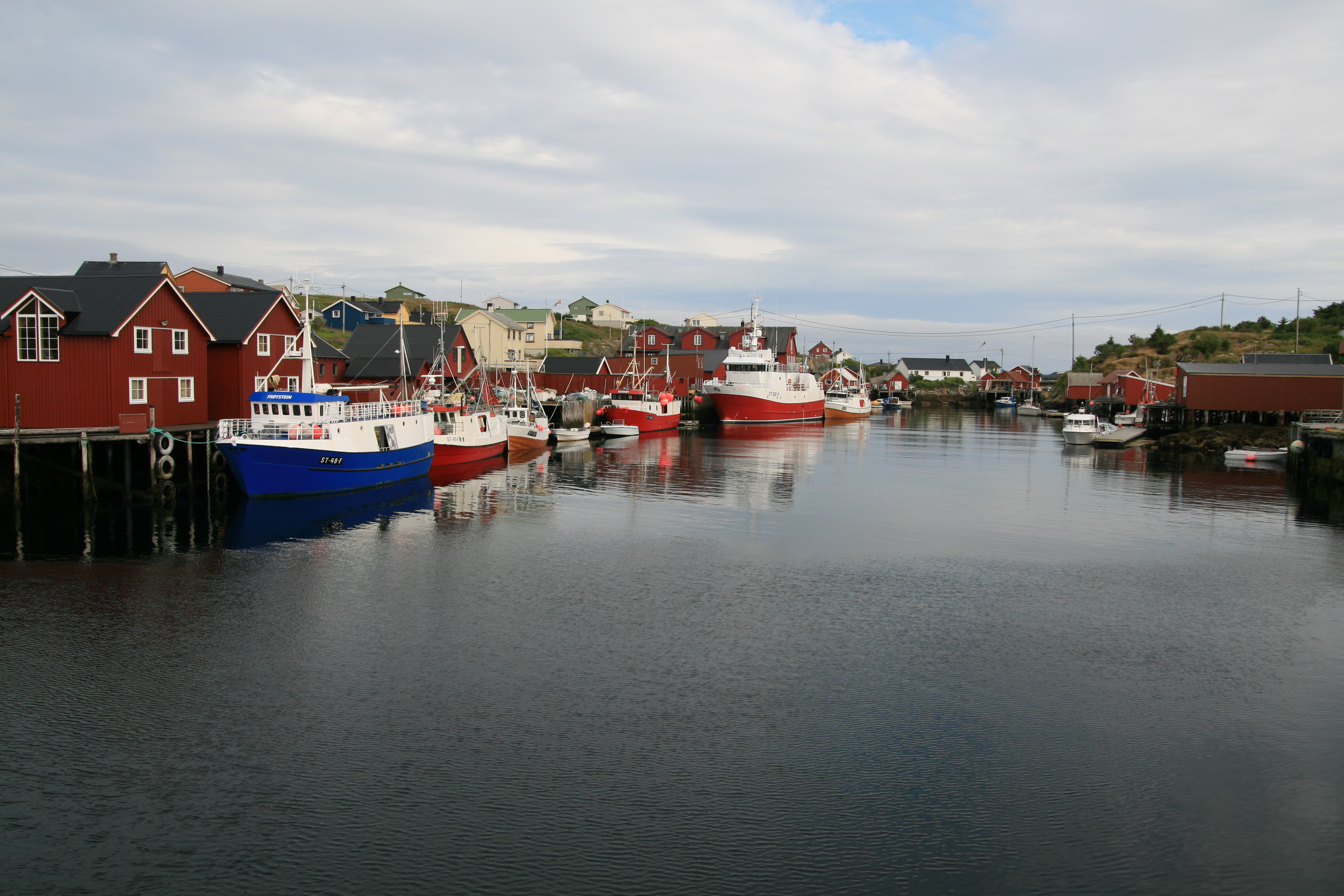

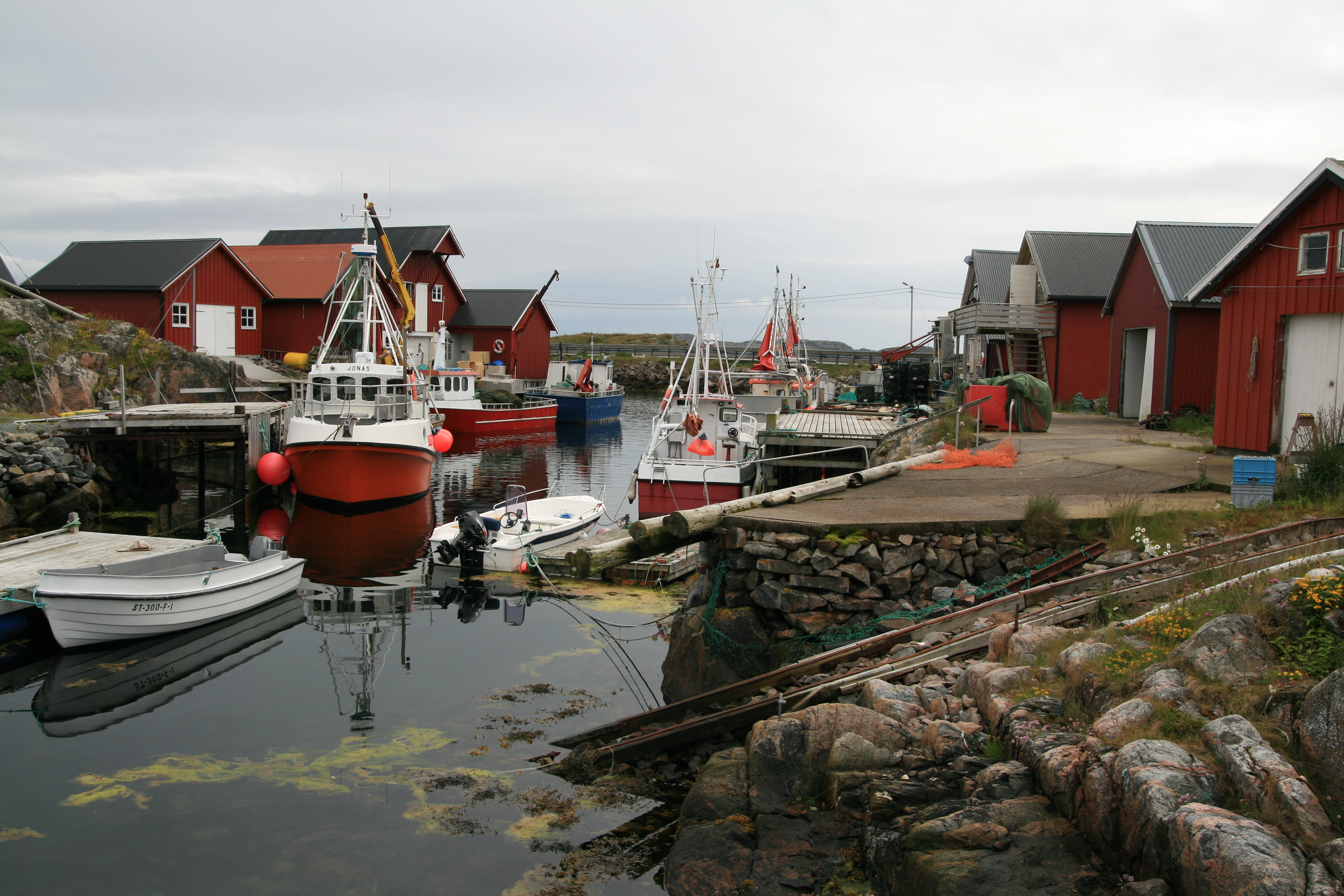

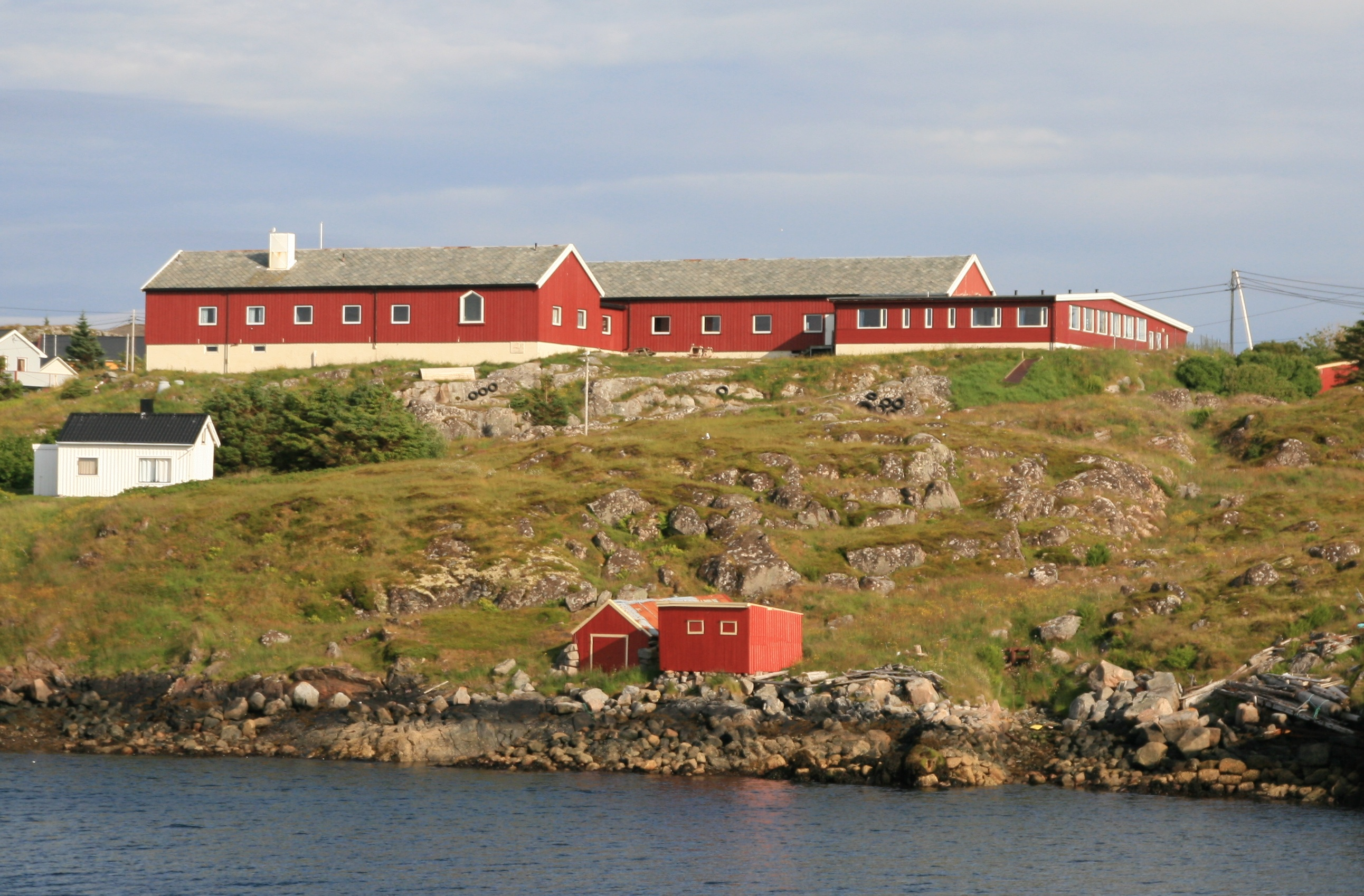

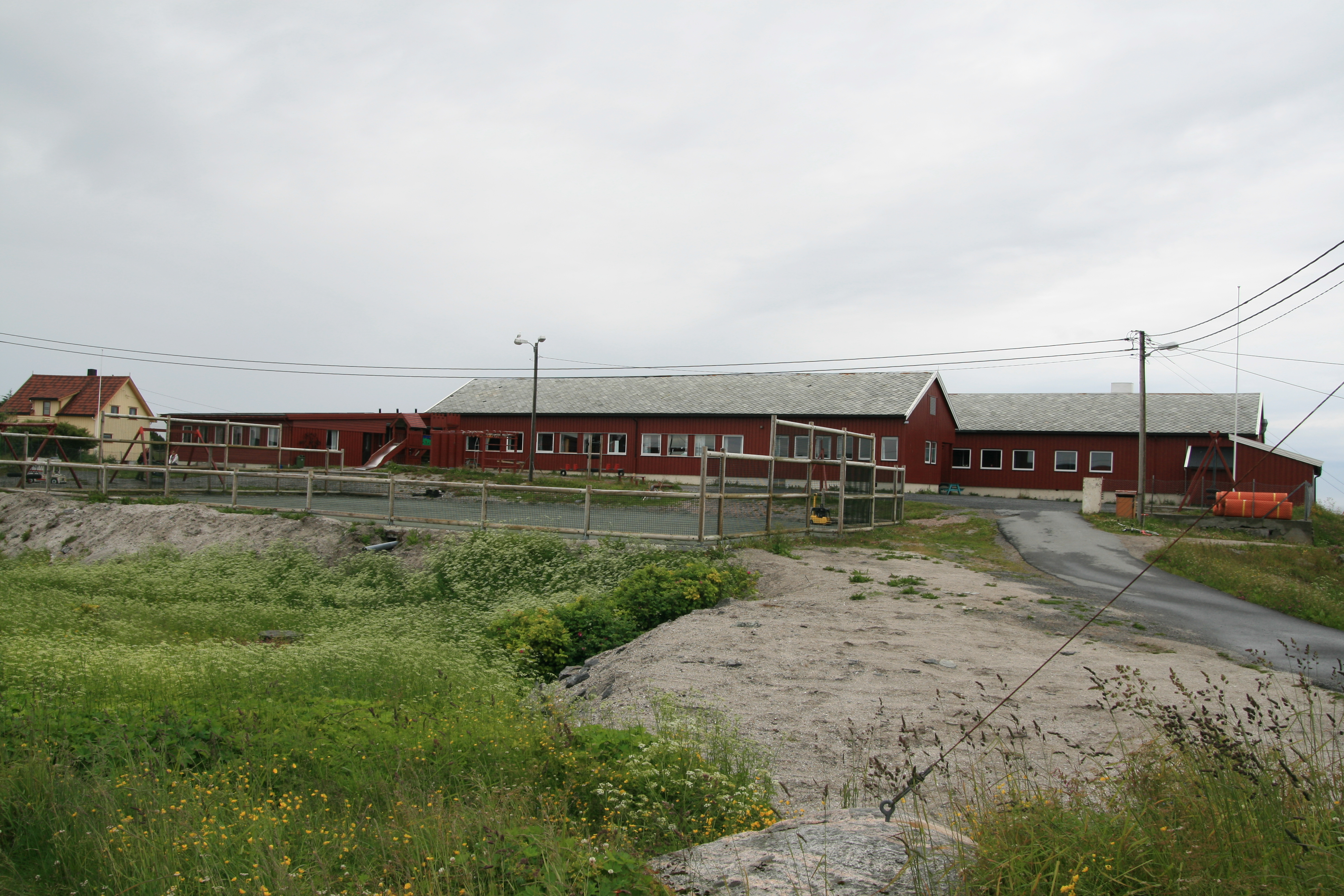

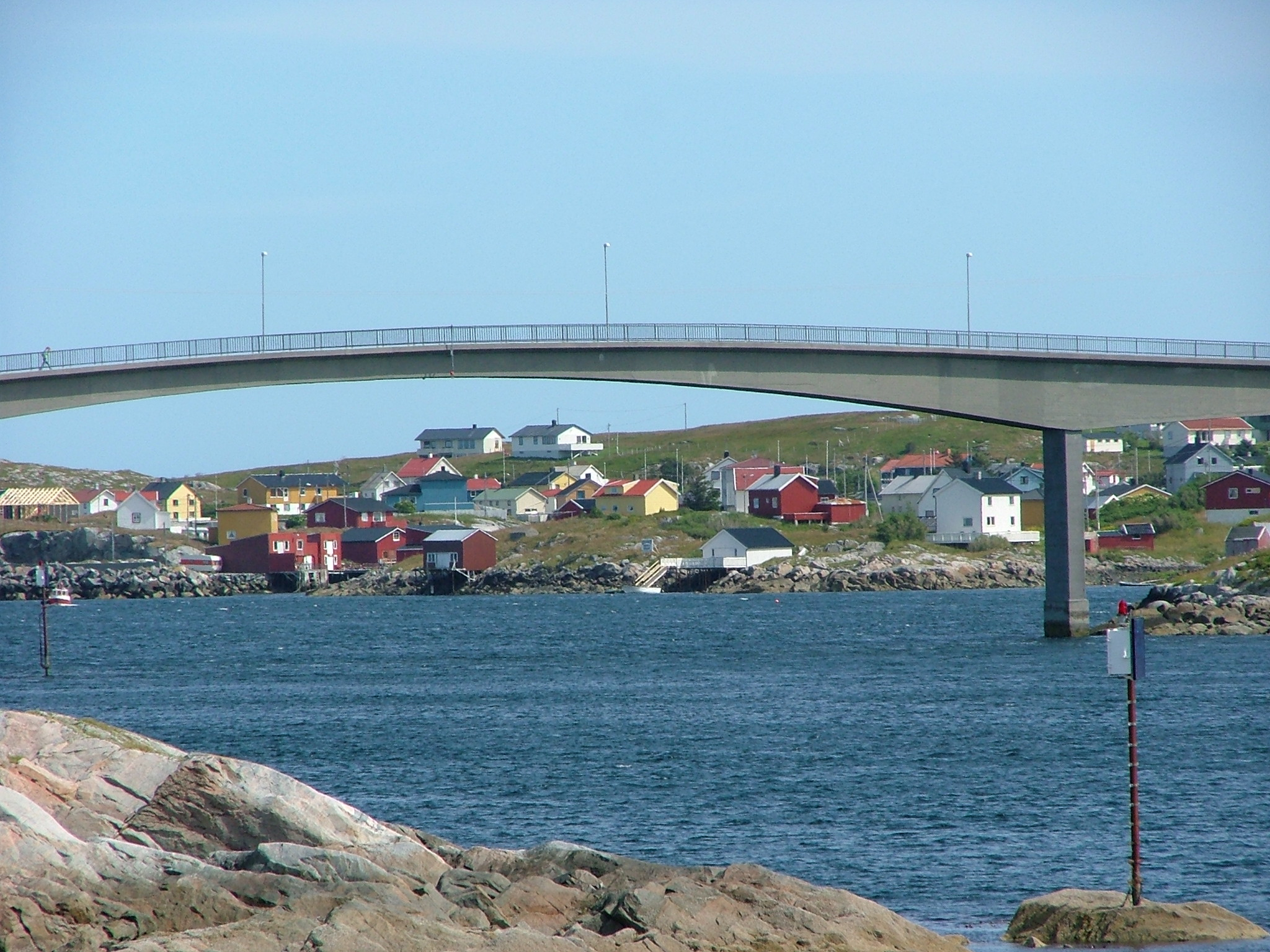

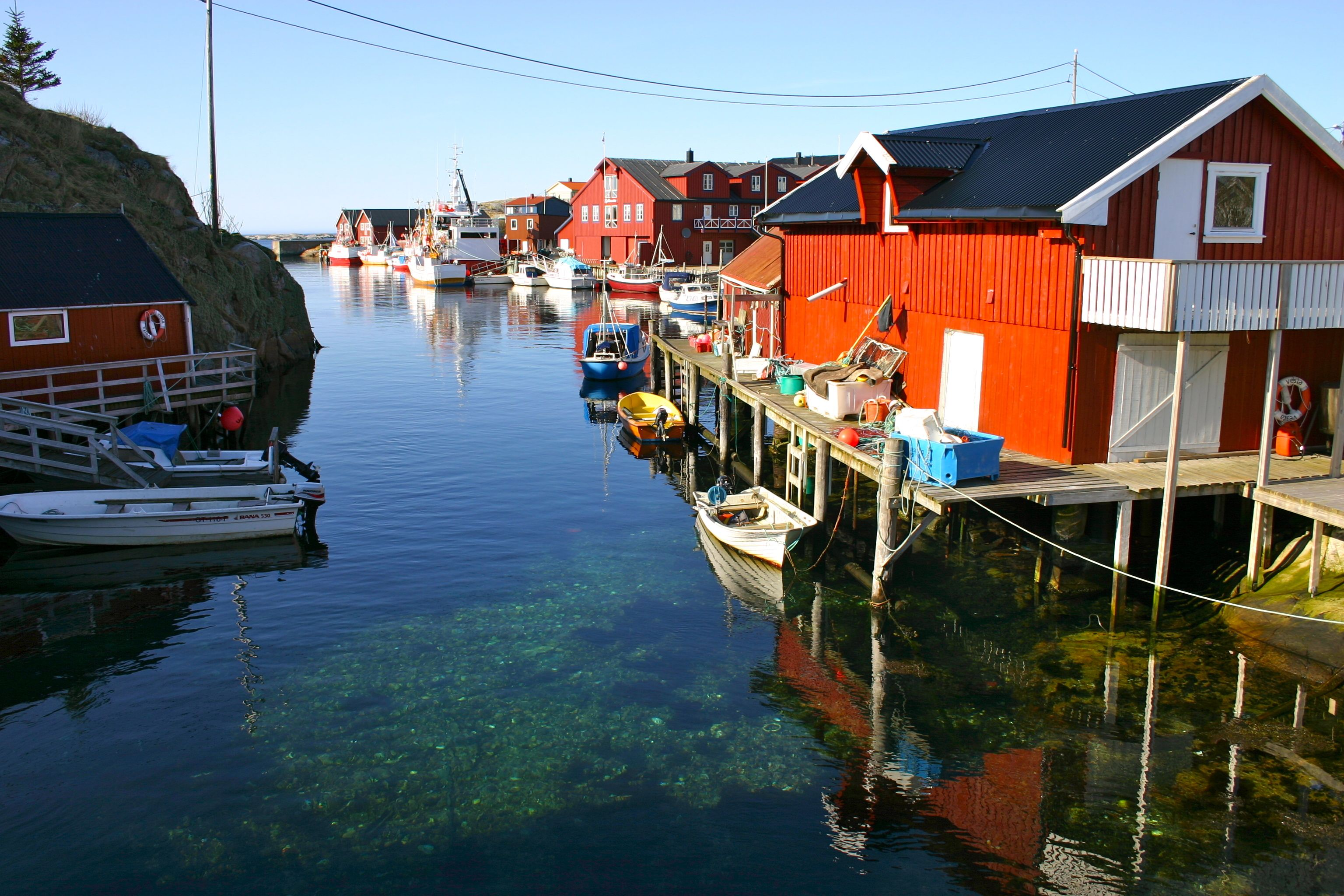

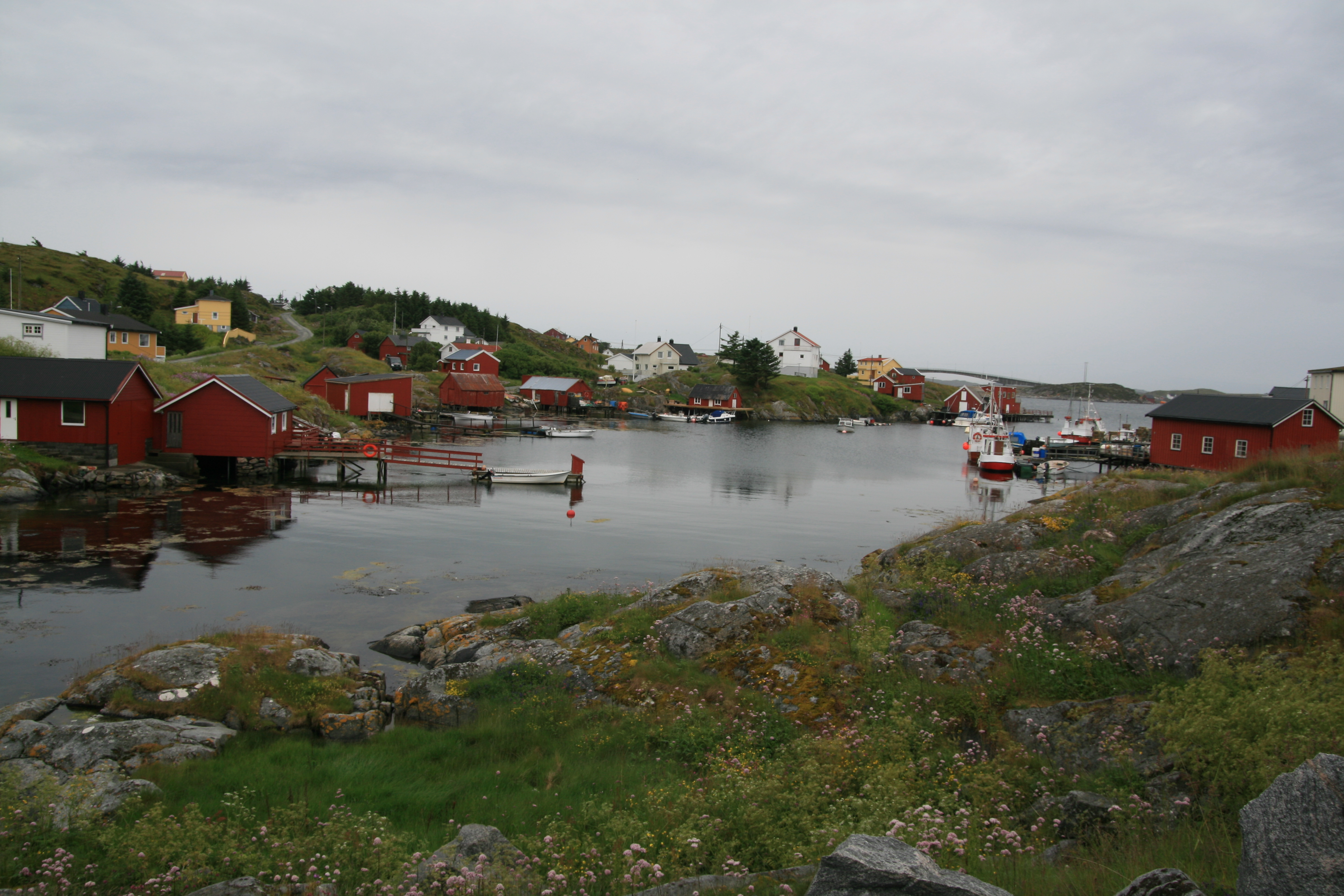

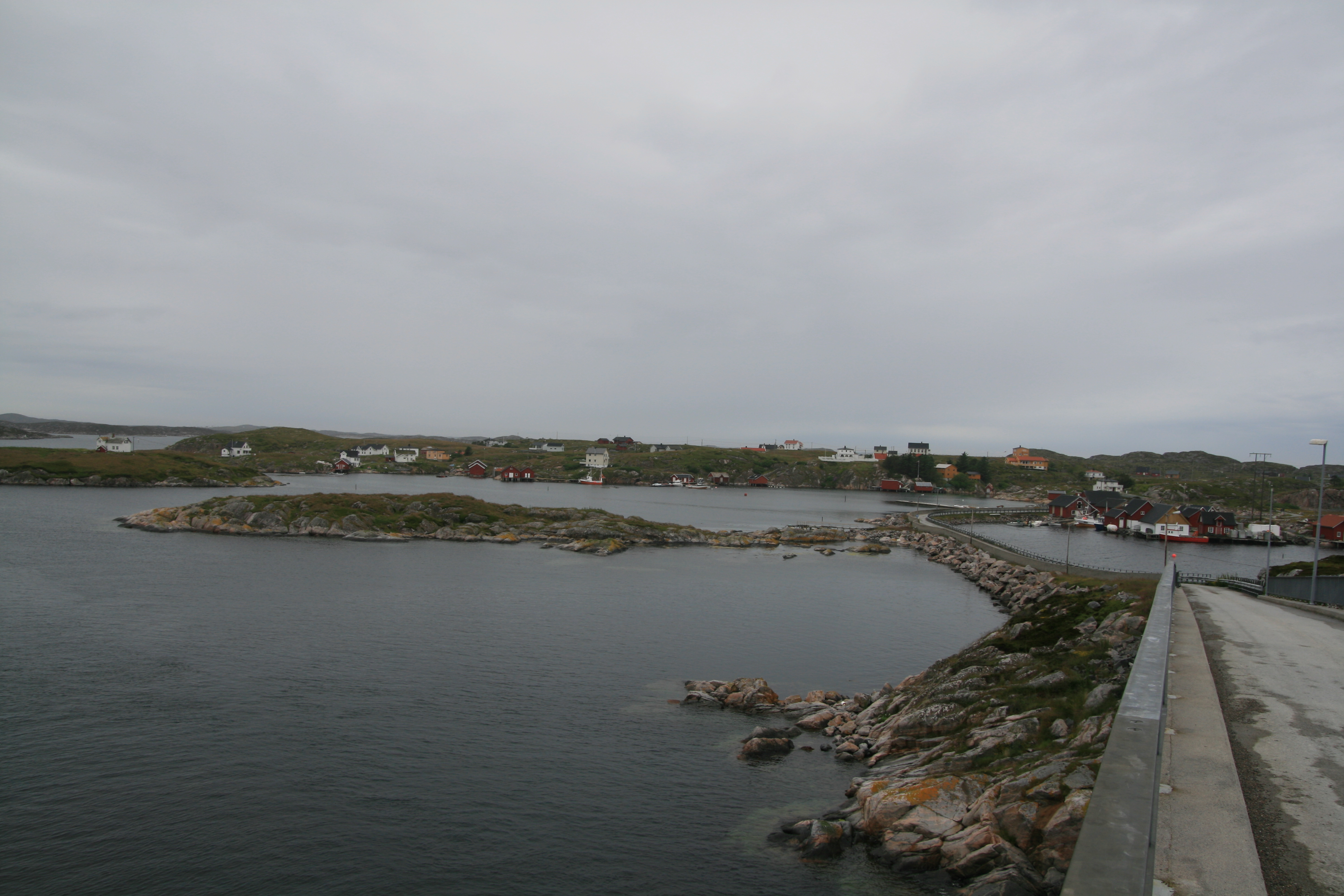

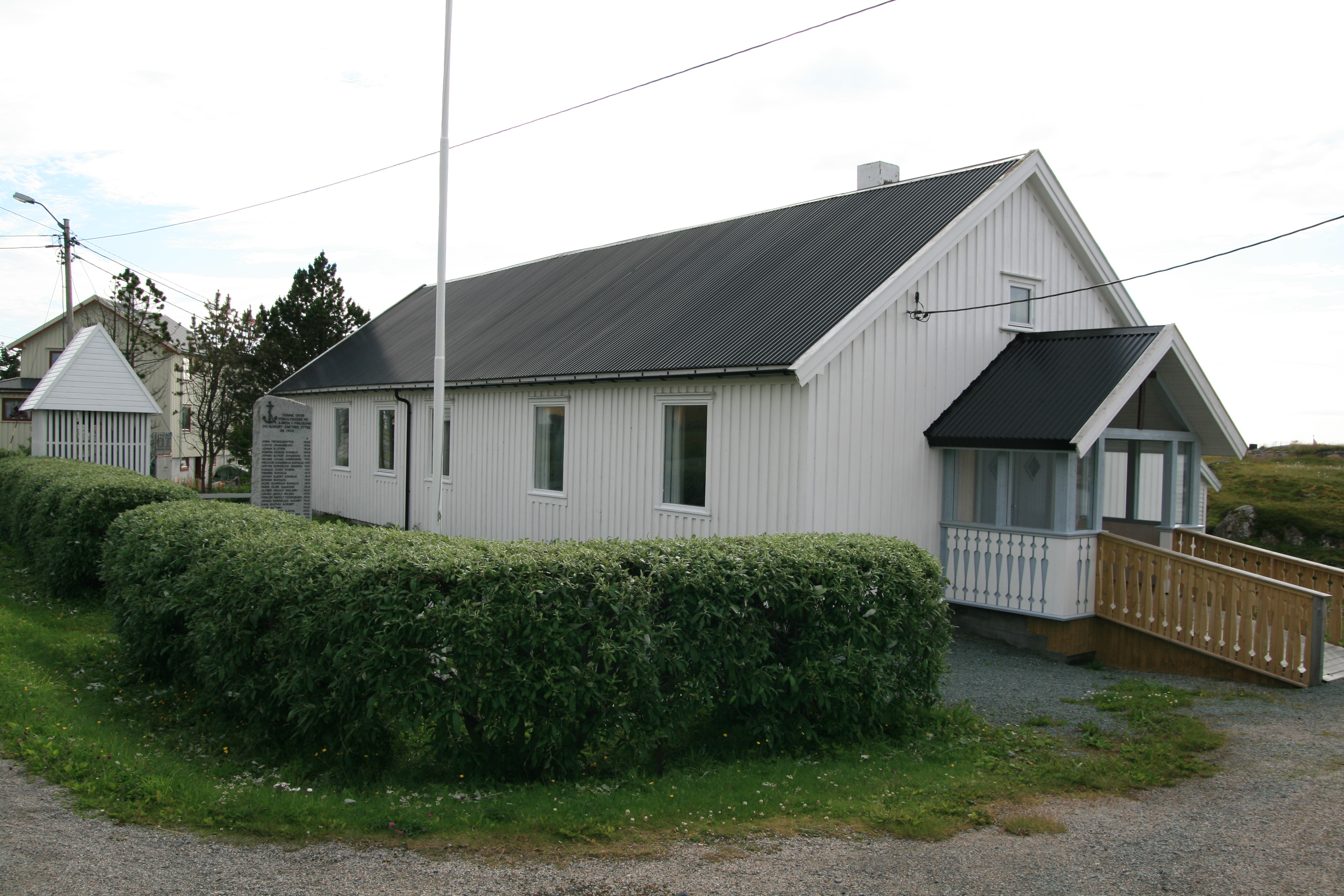
