= Hallaren Church =

Church in Trøndelag, Norway

- Hallaren kirke
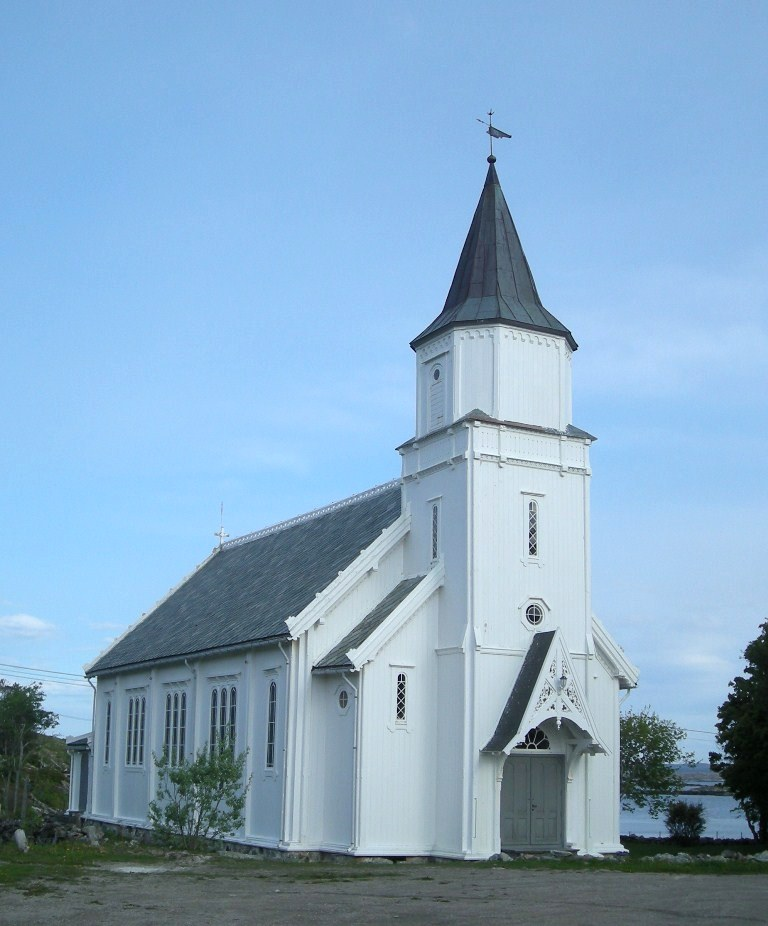
- View of the church
- Hallaren Church
- 63.6771163361°N 08.6183479428°E
- Location: Frøya Municipality, Trøndelag
- Country: Norway
- Denomination: Church of Norway
- Churchmanship: Evangelical Lutheran

History
- Former name: Sør-Frøya Church
- Status: Parish church
- Founded: 1881
- Consecrated: 15 September 1881

Architecture
- Functional status: Active
- Architect: Henrik Nissen
- Architectural type: Long church
- Completed: 1881 (145 years ago)

Specifications
- Capacity: 400
- Materials: Wood

Administration
- Diocese: Nidaros bispedømme
- Deanery: Orkdal prosti
- Parish: Frøya
- Norwegian Cultural Heritage Site
- Type: Church
- Status: Automatically protected
- ID: 85053

Hallaren Church (Norwegian: Hallaren kirke) is a parish church of the Church of Norway in Frøya Municipality in Trøndelag county, Norway. It is located in the village of Storhallaren on the southern coast of the island of Frøya. It is one of several churches for the Frøya parish, which is part of the Orkdal prosti (deanery) in the Diocese of Nidaros. The white, wooden church was built in a long church design in 1881 using plans drawn up by the architect Henrik Nissen. The church seats about 400 people.

== History ==
On 1 January 1877, the new Frøien Municipality was established. Nearly one year later on 15 December 1877, the municipality was divided into two church parishes with Sletta Church becoming the main church for the new Nord-Frøya parish and plans for a new church for the southern Sør-Frøya parish began soon after. The new church was built at Storhallaren in 1881 and it was consecrated on 15 September 1881. The architect Henrik Nissen was hired by both parishes to build new churches. He built a new Sletta Church in 1880 followed by the new Hallaren Church in 1881. Kristian Hovde was the lead builder for the new church. The new church has a rectangular nave with a chancel on the east end that has a sacristy on the north and south sides of the chancel. On the west end of the building is a church porch with a large tower above it.

== See also ==
- List of churches in Nidaros
