= Frøya Municipality =

Municipality in Trøndelag, Norway

Frøya Municipality Frøya kommune
- Municipality
- Frøien herred (historic name)
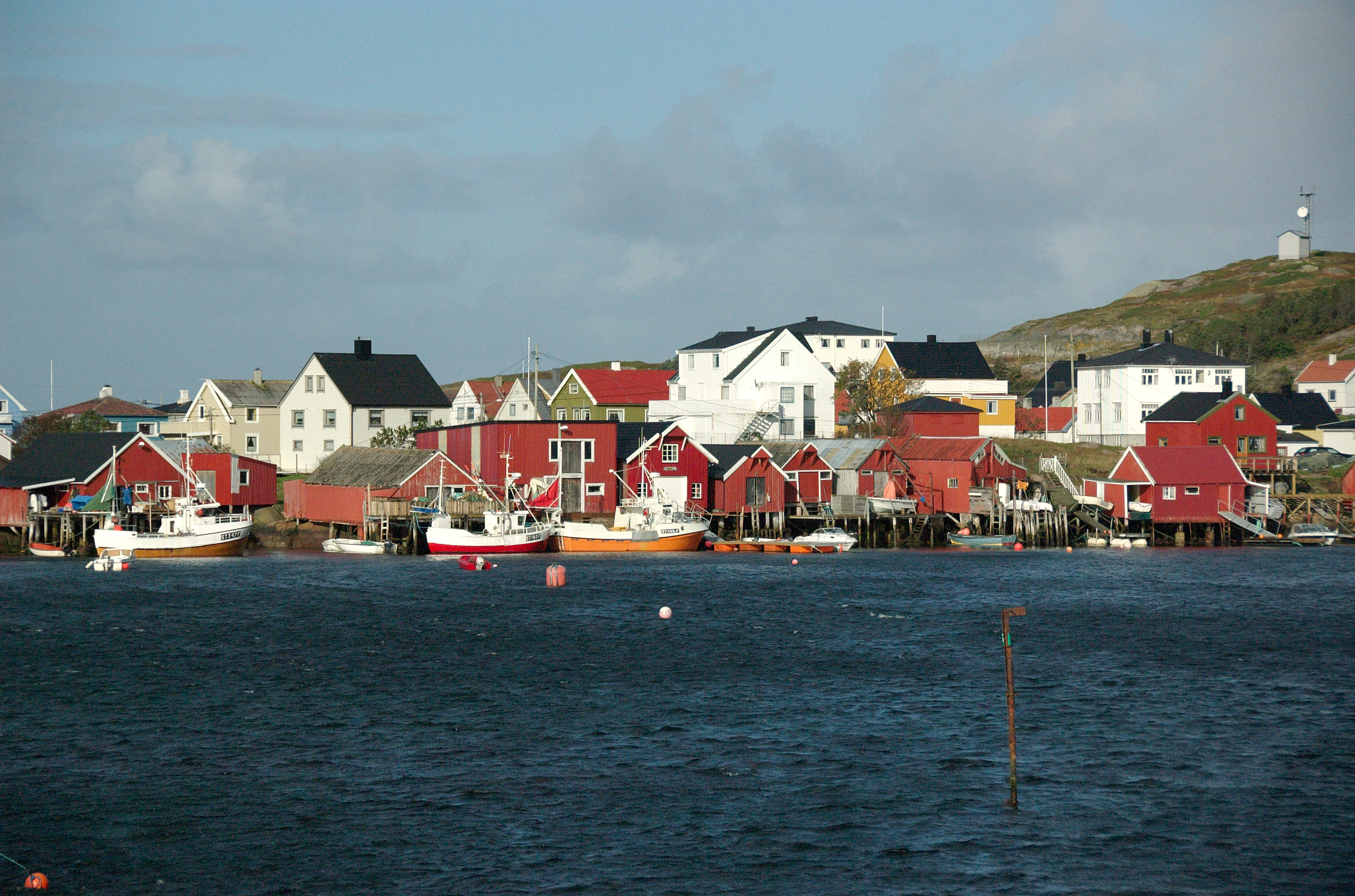
- View of the village of Sula

- Flag Coat of arms

- Trøndelag within Norway

- Frøya within Trøndelag
- Coordinates: 63°43′32″N 08°44′39″E
- Country: Norway
- County: Trøndelag
- District: Fosen
- Established: 1 Jan 1877
  - Preceded by: Hitra Municipality
- Disestablished: 1 Jan 1906
  - Succeeded by: Nord-Frøya and Sør-Frøya
- Re-established: 1 Jan 1964
  - Preceded by: Nord-Frøya and Sør-Frøya
- Administrative centre: Sistranda

Government
  - Mayor (2019): Kristin Furunes Strømskag (H)

Area
  - Total: 241.32 km^{2} (93.17 sq mi)
  - Land: 229.94 km^{2} (88.78 sq mi)
  - Water: 11.38 km^{2} (4.39 sq mi) 4.7%
  - Rank: #292 in Norway
- Highest elevation: 74.73 m (245.2 ft)

Population (2024)
  - Total: 5,453
  - Rank: #176 in Norway
  - Density: 22.6/km^{2} (59/sq mi)
  - Change (10 years): ▲ +19.9%
- Demonym: Frøyværing

Official language
  - Norwegian form: Bokmål
- Time zone: UTC+01:00 (CET)
  - Summer (DST): UTC+02:00 (CEST)
- ISO 3166 code: NO-5014
- Website: Official website

Frøya is the westernmost municipality in Trøndelag county, Norway. It is part of the Fosen region and consists of the island of Frøya, which lies north of the island of Hitra, as well several thousand other small islands surrounding the island of Frøya. The village of Sistranda is the administrative center of Frøya Municipality. Other villages include Hammarvika, Titran, Sula, and Mausund. The main island of Frøya is connected to the neighboring island of Hitra (and ultimately the mainland of Norway) by the Frøya Tunnel, which goes under the Frøyfjorden.

The 241-square-kilometre (93 sq mi) municipality is the 292nd largest by area out of the 357 municipalities in Norway. Frøya Municipality is the 176th most populous municipality in Norway with a population of 5,453. The municipality's population density is 22.6 inhabitants per square kilometre (59/sq mi), and its population has increased by 19.9% over the previous 10-year period.

== General information ==
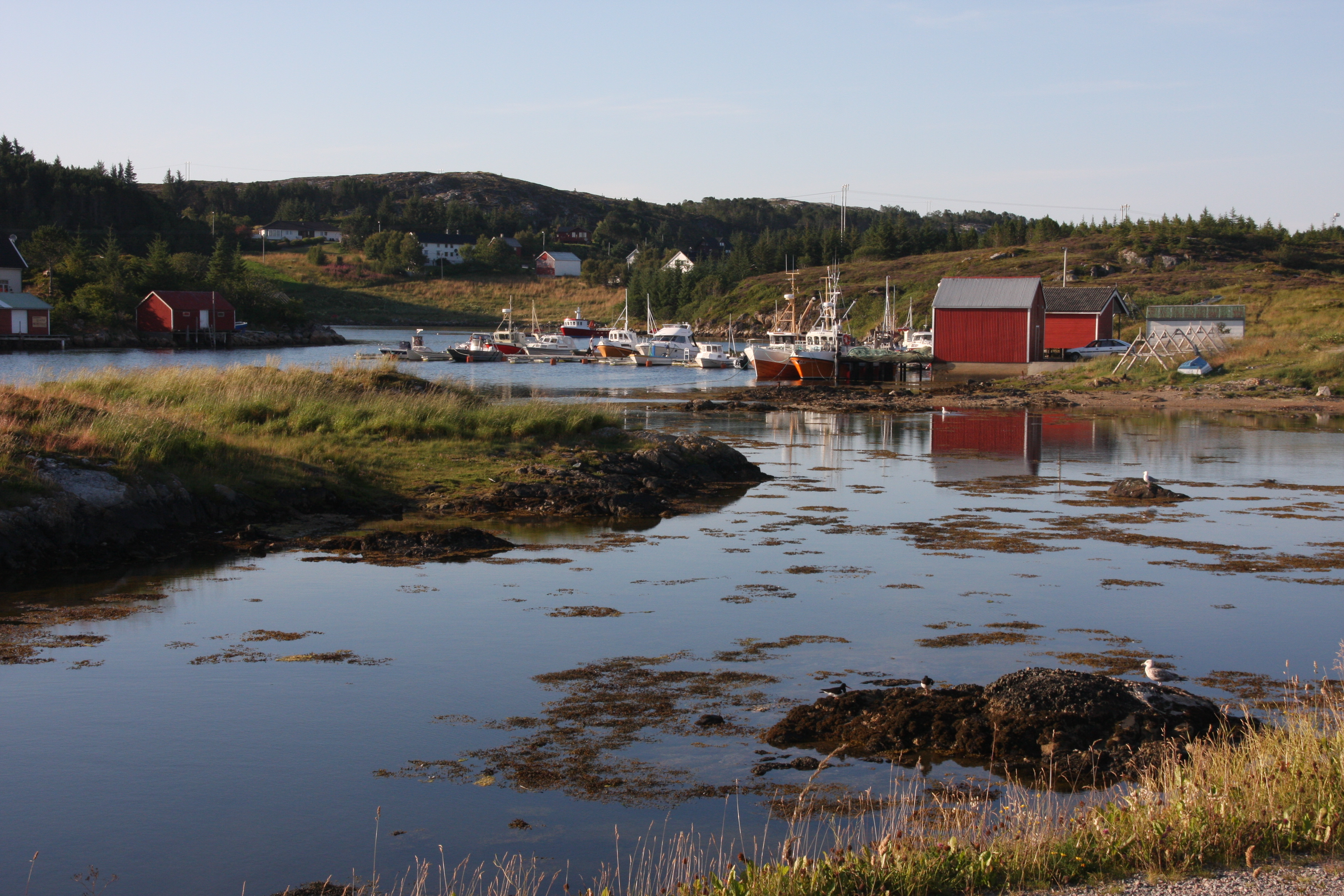
Flatval in Frøya Municipality

The parish of Frøya was established as a municipality on 1 January 1877 when it was separated from Hitra Municipality. Its initial population was 3,949. On 1 January 1906, it was split into two municipalities: Nord-Frøya Municipality in the north and Sør-Frøya Municipality in the south. During the 1960s, there were many municipal mergers across Norway due to the work of the Schei Committee. On 1 January 1964, Nord-Frøya Municipality (population: 4,348) and Sør-Frøya Municipality (population: 2,208) were merged back together again, forming a new Frøya Municipality.

On 1 January 2018, the municipality switched from the old Sør-Trøndelag county to the new Trøndelag county.

=== Name ===
The name of the island and municipality come from Norse mythology. Although Frøya is a variant of the name of the Norse goddess Freyja, the Old Norse form of the name of the island was Frøy or Frey (the ending -a in the modern form is actually the feminine definite article – so the meaning of Frøya is 'the Frøy'). Therefore, the name of the island probably has the same root as the name of the Norse god Freyr, brother to Freyja. The names originally were titles: "lord" or "lady". The oldest meaning of the common word was "(the one) in front; the foremost, the leading" and here in the sense "the island in front of Hitra". Until 1906 the island and municipality name was spelled Frøien (-en is the masculine definite article in Norwegian).

=== Coat of arms ===
The coat of arms was granted on 13 March 1987. The official blazon is "Azure, three fishhooks argent in bend" (Norwegian: I blått tre sølv angler i skrå rekke). This means the arms have a blue field (background) and the charge is a series of three fish hooks lined up diagonally. The fish hooks have a tincture of argent which means it is commonly colored white, but if it is made out of metal, then silver is used. The fish hooks mimic Stone Age hooks made of bone that are meant to symbolize the importance of fishing and trapping by the people of Frøya. The arms were designed by Einar H. Skjervold based on an idea by S. Hogstad from Kolsås.

=== Churches ===
The Church of Norway has one parish (sokn) within Frøya Municipality. It is part of the Orkdal prosti (deanery) in the Diocese of Nidaros.

Churches in Frøya Municipality
Parish (sokn)	Church name	Location of the church	Year built
Frøya	Sletta Church	Slette, near Svellingen	1990
Frøya	Hallaren Church	Storhallaren	1881
Frøya	Froan Chapel	Sauøya (Froan)	1904
Frøya	Måøy Chapel	Mausund (Måøya)	1939
Frøya	Sula Chapel	Sula	1925
Frøya	Titran Chapel	Titran	1873

== Geography ==
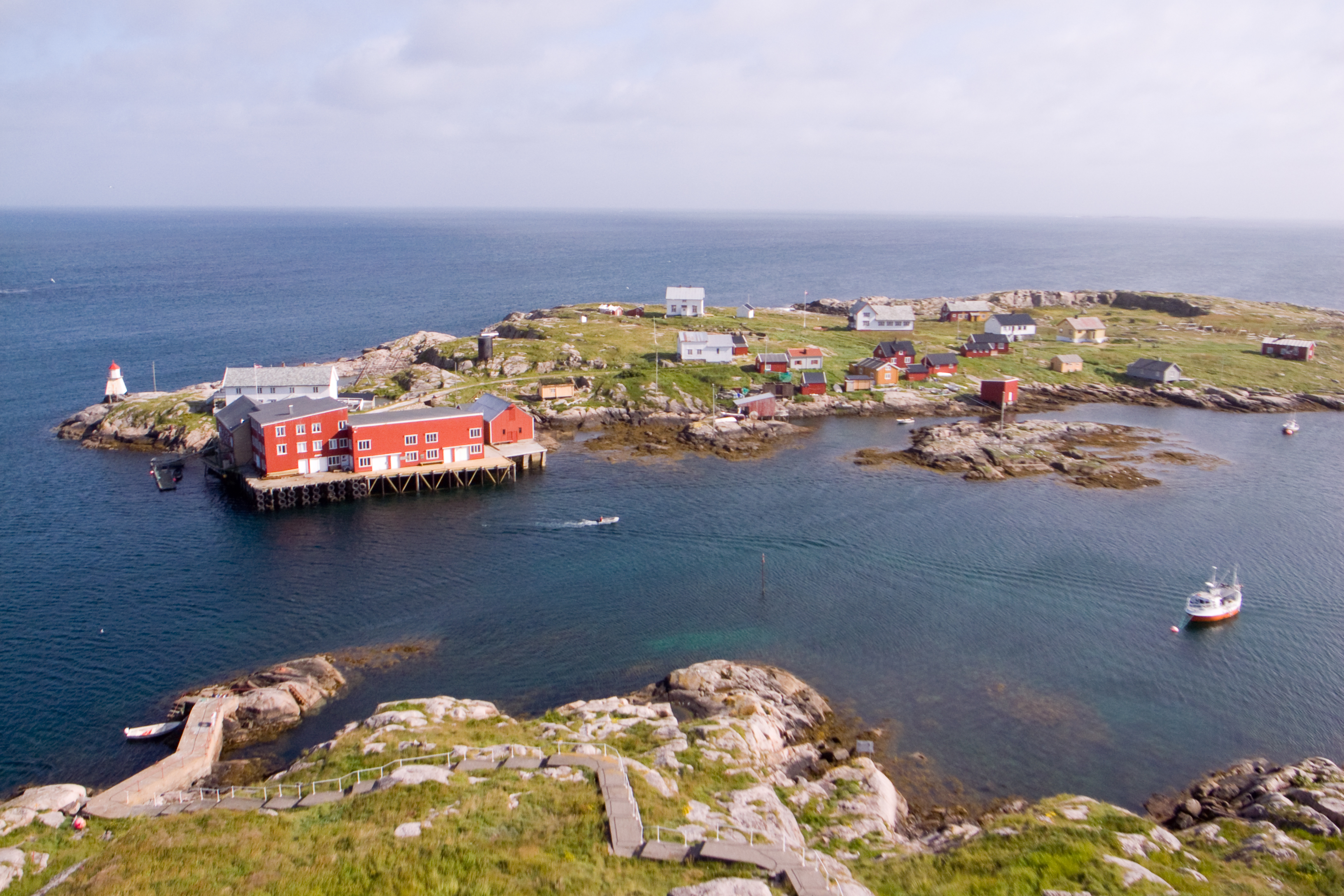
Halten, view from Halten lighthouse

Frøya Municipality has many small fishing communities on the large island of Frøya and many small islands in the ocean such as Mausund, Bogøyvær, and Sula, with Mausund being the largest of these with a population of approximately 270. Other small islands such as Froan and Halten lay to the northeast of the island of Frøya. Many of these islands are home to lighthouses such as Halten Lighthouse, Finnvær Lighthouse, Vingleia Lighthouse, Sula Lighthouse, and Sletringen Lighthouse.

The main island of Frøya is fairly open and has no natural forests–mostly covered with marshes and heather. The largest villages on the island are Sistranda in the east and Titran in the west. Frøya is a member of the International Island Games Association. The highest point above sea level is the 74.73-metre (245.2 ft) tall Besselvassheia, and the second highest point is the 74-metre (243 ft) tall Bremnestua.

=== Climate ===
Frøya has a temperate oceanic climate (Cfb) with a year amplitude of only 11.2 °C (20 °F) from the coldest to the warmest month. November and December are the wettest months, while April – July are the driest part of the year. The record high is from July 2014, and the record low is from February 2010. The average date for the last overnight freeze (below 0 °C (32.0 °F)) in spring is 4 April and average date for first freeze in autumn is 20 November (1981-2010 average) giving an average frost-free season of 229 days.

Climate data for Sula, Frøya 1991-2020 (5 m, extremes 1975-2025)
Month	Jan	Feb	Mar	Apr	May	Jun	Jul	Aug	Sep	Oct	Nov	Dec	Year
Record high °C (°F)	11.7 (53.1)	11.5 (52.7)	13.3 (55.9)	19.3 (66.7)	24.6 (76.3)	27.7 (81.9)	28.5 (83.3)	26.3 (79.3)	22.7 (72.9)	18.8 (65.8)	14.6 (58.3)	11.1 (52.0)	28.5 (83.3)
Mean daily maximum °C (°F)	4.6 (40.3)	4.2 (39.6)	5.2 (41.4)	7.6 (45.7)	10.4 (50.7)	13 (55)	15.6 (60.1)	16.1 (61.0)	13.8 (56.8)	9.8 (49.6)	6.9 (44.4)	5.5 (41.9)	9.4 (48.9)
Daily mean °C (°F)	3.1 (37.6)	2.5 (36.5)	3.2 (37.8)	5.4 (41.7)	8 (46)	10.7 (51.3)	13 (55)	13.7 (56.7)	11.8 (53.2)	8.3 (46.9)	5.5 (41.9)	3.8 (38.8)	7.4 (45.3)
Mean daily minimum °C (°F)	1.2 (34.2)	0.9 (33.6)	1.6 (34.9)	3.5 (38.3)	6 (43)	8.9 (48.0)	11.3 (52.3)	12.2 (54.0)	10.2 (50.4)	6.6 (43.9)	3.7 (38.7)	2.1 (35.8)	5.7 (42.3)
Record low °C (°F)	−12.3 (9.9)	−12.7 (9.1)	−8.1 (17.4)	−3.6 (25.5)	−0.3 (31.5)	2.7 (36.9)	5 (41)	7.1 (44.8)	2 (36)	−1.1 (30.0)	−7 (19)	−10.9 (12.4)	−12.7 (9.1)
Average precipitation mm (inches)	92 (3.6)	75 (3.0)	80 (3.1)	55 (2.2)	46 (1.8)	53 (2.1)	57 (2.2)	74 (2.9)	104 (4.1)	88 (3.5)	108 (4.3)	113 (4.4)	945 (37.2)
Source 1: Norwegian Meteorological Institute
Source 2: NOAA-WMO averages 91-2020 Norway

== Government ==
Frøya Municipality is responsible for primary education (through 10th grade), outpatient health services, senior citizen services, welfare and other social services, zoning, economic development, and municipal roads and utilities. The municipality is governed by a municipal council of directly elected representatives. The mayor is indirectly elected by a vote of the municipal council. The municipality is under the jurisdiction of the Trøndelag District Court and the Frostating Court of Appeal. Waste management was from 2006 handled by the inter-municipal agency HAMOS Forvaltning. It merged into ReMidt in 2020.

=== Municipal council ===
The municipal council (Kommunestyre) of Frøya Municipality is made up of 23 representatives that are elected to four year terms. The tables below show the current and historical composition of the council by political party.

Frøya kommunestyre 2023–2027
Party name (in Norwegian)	Number of representatives
Labour Party (Arbeiderpartiet)	5
Progress Party (Fremskrittspartiet)	3
Conservative Party (Høyre)	9
Industry and Business Party (Industri‑ og Næringspartiet)	1
Pensioners' Party (Pensjonistpartiet)	1
Red Party (Rødt)	1
Centre Party (Senterpartiet)	1
Socialist Left Party (Sosialistisk Venstreparti)	1
Liberal Party (Venstre)	1
Total number of members:	23

Frøya kommunestyre 2019–2023
Party name (in Norwegian)	Number of representatives
Labour Party (Arbeiderpartiet)	7
Progress Party (Fremskrittspartiet)	2
Conservative Party (Høyre)	3
Pensioners' Party (Pensjonistpartiet)	1
Red Party (Rødt)	2
Centre Party (Senterpartiet)	5
Socialist Left Party (Sosialistisk Venstreparti)	1
Liberal Party (Venstre)	2
Total number of members:	23

Frøya kommunestyre 2015–2019
Party name (in Norwegian)	Number of representatives
Labour Party (Arbeiderpartiet)	12
Progress Party (Fremskrittspartiet)	3
Conservative Party (Høyre)	2
Centre Party (Senterpartiet)	1
Socialist Left Party (Sosialistisk Venstreparti)	1
Liberal Party (Venstre)	4
Total number of members:	23

Frøya kommunestyre 2011–2015
Party name (in Norwegian)	Number of representatives
Labour Party (Arbeiderpartiet)	10
Progress Party (Fremskrittspartiet)	5
Conservative Party (Høyre)	2
Centre Party (Senterpartiet)	1
Socialist Left Party (Sosialistisk Venstreparti)	1
Liberal Party (Venstre)	4
Total number of members:	23

Frøya kommunestyre 2007–2011
Party name (in Norwegian)	Number of representatives
Labour Party (Arbeiderpartiet)	7
Progress Party (Fremskrittspartiet)	5
Conservative Party (Høyre)	2
Christian Democratic Party (Kristelig Folkeparti)	1
Centre Party (Senterpartiet)	1
Socialist Left Party (Sosialistisk Venstreparti)	2
Liberal Party (Venstre)	5
Total number of members:	23

Frøya kommunestyre 2003–2007
Party name (in Norwegian)	Number of representatives
Labour Party (Arbeiderpartiet)	7
Progress Party (Fremskrittspartiet)	3
Conservative Party (Høyre)	3
Christian Democratic Party (Kristelig Folkeparti)	2
Centre Party (Senterpartiet)	2
Socialist Left Party (Sosialistisk Venstreparti)	2
Liberal Party (Venstre)	4
Total number of members:	23

Frøya kommunestyre 1999–2003
Party name (in Norwegian)	Number of representatives
Labour Party (Arbeiderpartiet)	11
Progress Party (Fremskrittspartiet)	1
Conservative Party (Høyre)	4
Christian Democratic Party (Kristelig Folkeparti)	2
Centre Party (Senterpartiet)	2
Socialist Left Party (Sosialistisk Venstreparti)	1
Liberal Party (Venstre)	2
Total number of members:	23

Frøya kommunestyre 1995–1999
Party name (in Norwegian)	Number of representatives
Labour Party (Arbeiderpartiet)	16
Progress Party (Fremskrittspartiet)	1
Conservative Party (Høyre)	3
Christian Democratic Party (Kristelig Folkeparti)	2
Centre Party (Senterpartiet)	3
Socialist Left Party (Sosialistisk Venstreparti)	2
Liberal Party (Venstre)	2
Total number of members:	29

Frøya kommunestyre 1991–1995
Party name (in Norwegian)	Number of representatives
Labour Party (Arbeiderpartiet)	15
Progress Party (Fremskrittspartiet)	1
Conservative Party (Høyre)	3
Christian Democratic Party (Kristelig Folkeparti)	2
Centre Party (Senterpartiet)	3
Socialist Left Party (Sosialistisk Venstreparti)	2
Liberal Party (Venstre)	1
Joint list of the Pensioners' Party and the Pensioner and insured list (Pensjonistpartiet, Pensjonister og Trygdedes liste)	2
Total number of members:	29

Frøya kommunestyre 1987–1991
Party name (in Norwegian)	Number of representatives
Labour Party (Arbeiderpartiet)	12
Conservative Party (Høyre)	4
Christian Democratic Party (Kristelig Folkeparti)	4
Pensioners' Party (Pensjonistpartiet)	2
Centre Party (Senterpartiet)	3
Socialist Left Party (Sosialistisk Venstreparti)	1
Liberal Party (Venstre)	3
Total number of members:	29

Frøya kommunestyre 1983–1987
Party name (in Norwegian)	Number of representatives
Labour Party (Arbeiderpartiet)	13
Conservative Party (Høyre)	5
Christian Democratic Party (Kristelig Folkeparti)	6
Centre Party (Senterpartiet)	4
Socialist Left Party (Sosialistisk Venstreparti)	1
Liberal Party (Venstre)	4
Total number of members:	33

Frøya kommunestyre 1979–1983
Party name (in Norwegian)	Number of representatives
Labour Party (Arbeiderpartiet)	10
Conservative Party (Høyre)	5
Christian Democratic Party (Kristelig Folkeparti)	4
Centre Party (Senterpartiet)	5
Liberal Party (Venstre)	4
Non-party list (Upolitisk liste)	5
Total number of members:	33

Frøya kommunestyre 1975–1979
Party name (in Norwegian)	Number of representatives
Labour Party (Arbeiderpartiet)	15
Conservative Party (Høyre)	4
Christian Democratic Party (Kristelig Folkeparti)	7
Centre Party (Senterpartiet)	7
Socialist Left Party (Sosialistisk Venstreparti)	1
Liberal Party (Venstre)	3
Total number of members:	37

Frøya kommunestyre 1971–1975
Party name (in Norwegian)	Number of representatives
Labour Party (Arbeiderpartiet)	19
Conservative Party (Høyre)	5
Christian Democratic Party (Kristelig Folkeparti)	5
Centre Party (Senterpartiet)	3
Socialist People's Party (Sosialistisk Folkeparti)	1
Liberal Party (Venstre)	4
Total number of members:	37

Frøya kommunestyre 1967–1971
Party name (in Norwegian)	Number of representatives
Labour Party (Arbeiderpartiet)	17
Conservative Party (Høyre)	6
Christian Democratic Party (Kristelig Folkeparti)	5
Socialist People's Party (Sosialistisk Folkeparti)	1
Liberal Party (Venstre)	6
Local List(s) (Lokale lister)	2
Total number of members:	37

Frøya kommunestyre 1963–1967
Party name (in Norwegian)	Number of representatives
Labour Party (Arbeiderpartiet)	18
Conservative Party (Høyre)	7
Christian Democratic Party (Kristelig Folkeparti)	6
Liberal Party (Venstre)	6
Total number of members:	37

=== Mayors ===
The mayor (Norwegian: ordfører) of Frøya Municipality is the political leader of the municipality and the chairperson of the municipal council. Here is a list of people who have held this position:

- 1877–1885: Lars M. Eggen (H)
- 1886–1887: Martin Sivertsen (V)
- 1888–1889: Ivar Meland (V)
- 1890–1893: Martin Sivertsen (V)
- 1894–1897: Anton J. Leirvik (V)
- 1898–1898: Martin Sivertsen (V)
- 1899–1901: Kristian Sletvold (V)
- 1902–1905: Martin Sivertsen (V)
- (1905–1964: Frøya Municipality did not exist.)
- 1964–1967: Johan Rabben (H)
- 1968–1971: Georg Larsen (V)
- 1972–1975: Oskar Steinvik (Ap)
- 1975–1975: Asbjørn Waagø (Ap)
- 1976–1979: Jan Iversen (KrF)
- 1979–1987: Sigbjørn Larsen (KrF)
- 1987–2003: Jan Otto Fredagsvik (Ap)
- 2003–2007: Arvid Hammernes (V)
- 2007–2011: Hans Stølan (Ap)
- 2011–2019: Berit Flåmo (Ap)
- 2019–present: Kristin Furunes Strømskag (H)

== Notable people ==
- John A. Widtsoe (1872 in Frøya – 1952), a Norwegian American, LDS churchman, author, scientist, and academic
- Paul Martin Dahlø (1885 in Frøya – 1967), a Norwegian fisherman and politician who was Mayor of Frøya before and after World War II
- Alf Tande-Petersen (born 1950), a Norwegian TV personality, journalist, writer, and businessperson; brought up in Frøya
- Gustav Magnar Witzøe (born 1993 in Frøya), a billionaire and shareholder of salmon fish farming company SalMar ASA
