= Besselvassheia =

Mountain in Trøndelag, Norway

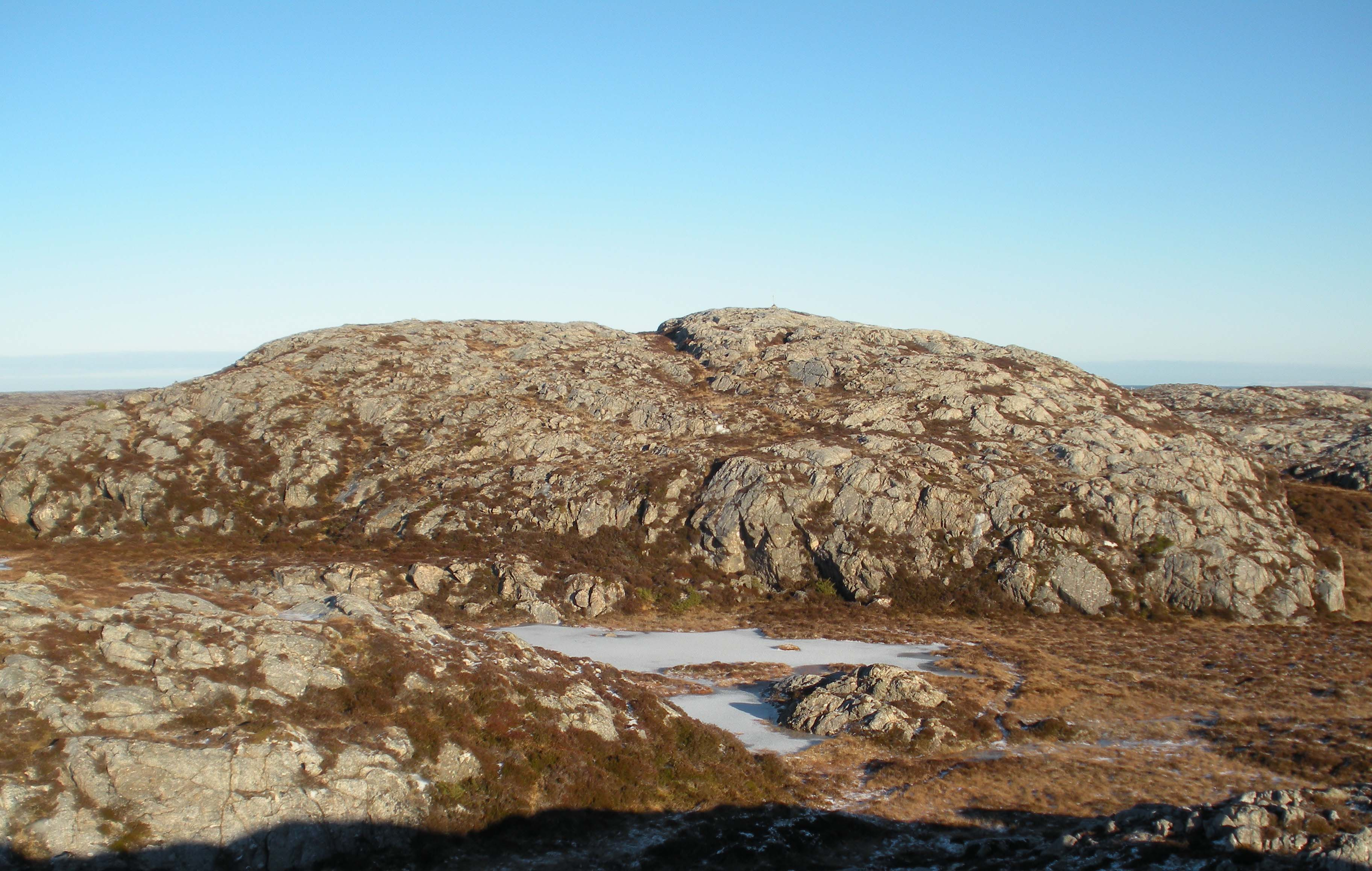
- View of Besselvassheia (2011)

Highest point
- Elevation: 76 m (249 ft)
- Coordinates: 63.7148°N 08.7396°E

Geography
- Interactive map of the mountain
- Location: Trøndelag, Norway

Climbing
- Easiest route: via Stuttvassdalen

Besselvassheia is a mountain in Frøya Municipality in Trøndelag county, Norway. The 76-metre (249 ft) tall mountain is the highest point on the island of Frøya. It lies about 4 kilometres (2.5 mi) west of the village of Sistranda and about 4 kilometres (2.5 mi) northwest of the village of Hammarvika.

== Name ==
The mountain was unnamed until the autumn of 2009 when it was given the name Besselvassheia, after the nearby lake Besselvatnet.

The well-known Norwegian soccer trainer Drillo, also known for his interest in geography, told a local resident, Frank Angelvik, that the highest point of Frøya was unnamed. Together with Halgeir Hammer, a local guide, the naming contest was announced in September 2009. Some of the names that were runners-up were: Frøyberget, Frøytuva, Halgeirtoppen, Halgeirguten, and Besselberget.
