= Sigbjørn Larsen =

Norwegian politician

Sigbjørn Larsen (born 18 July 1936) is a Norwegian politician for the Christian Democratic Party.

He served as a deputy representative in the Norwegian Parliament from Sør-Trøndelag during the terms 1981–1985 and 1993–1997.

On the local level, Larsen was mayor of Frøya Municipality from 1979 to 1987.
