= Måøy Chapel =

Church in Trøndelag, Norway

- Måøy kapell
- Mausund kapell
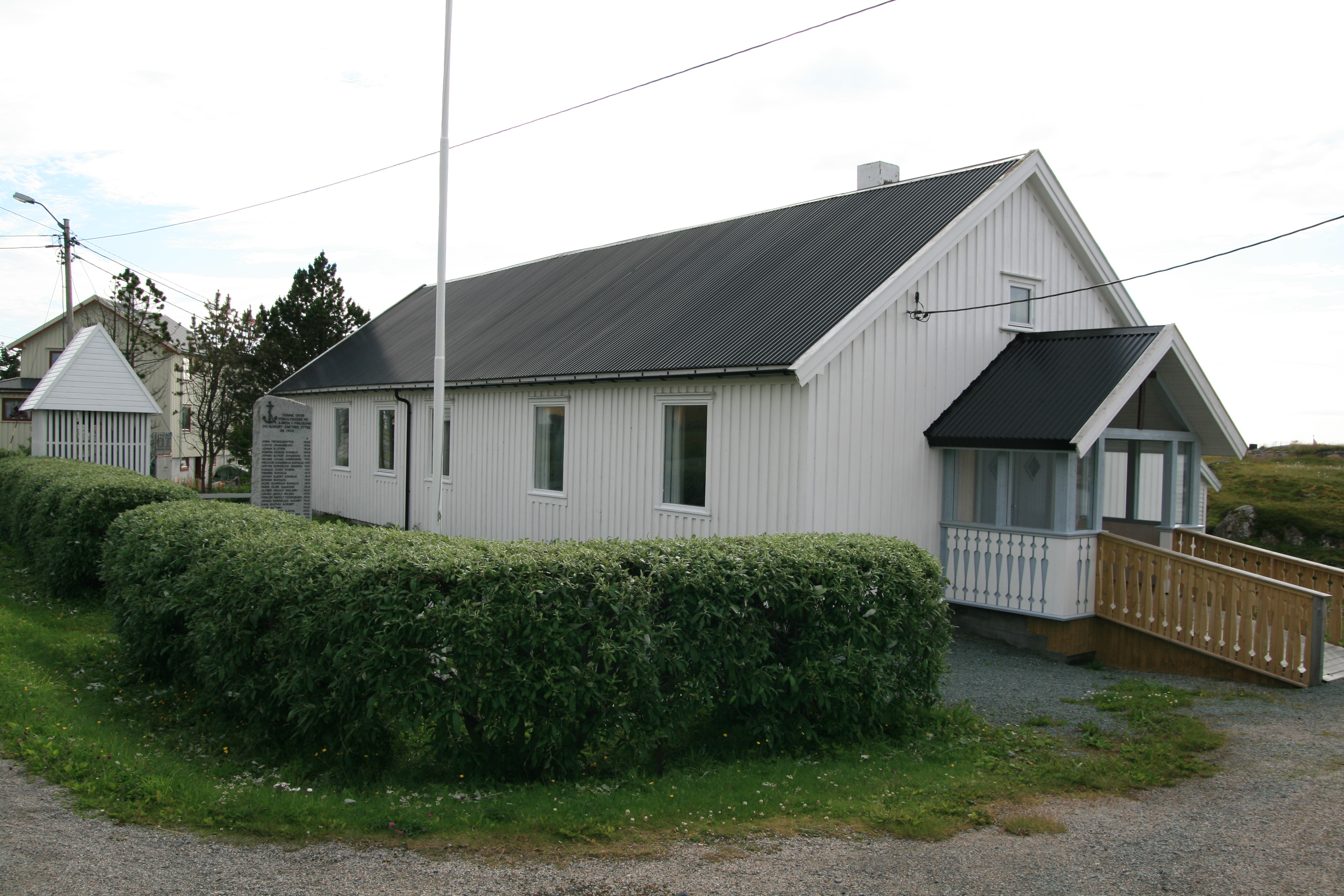
- View of the chapel
- Måøy Chapel
- 63.8654867328°N 08.6572276353°E
- Location: Frøya Municipality, Trøndelag
- Country: Norway
- Denomination: Church of Norway
- Churchmanship: Evangelical Lutheran

History
- Status: Chapel
- Founded: 1939
- Consecrated: 23 March 1975

Architecture
- Functional status: Active
- Architect: Steinar Gjetø
- Architectural type: Long church
- Completed: 1939 (87 years ago)

Specifications
- Capacity: 250
- Materials: Wood

Administration
- Diocese: Nidaros bispedømme
- Deanery: Orkdal prosti
- Parish: Frøya
- Norwegian Cultural Heritage Site
- Type: Church
- Status: Not protected
- ID: 84924

Måøy Chapel (Norwegian: Måøy kapell) is a chapel of the Church of Norway in Frøya Municipality in Trøndelag county, Norway. It is located in the village of Mausund on the island of Måøya. It is an annex chapel for the Frøya parish which is part of the Orkdal prosti (deanery) in the Diocese of Nidaros. The white, wooden church was built in a long church design in 1939 using plans drawn up by the architect Steinar Gjetø. The church seats about 250 people.

== History ==
The chapel was originally constructed in 1939 as a small "prayer house". From 1974-1975, the building was expanded by adding a choir and a sacristy. The expansion allowed the prayer house to be upgraded to the status of an annex chapel for the parish. The Bishop Tord Godal consecrated the newly renovated chapel on 23 March 1975.

== See also ==
- List of churches in Nidaros
