= Sistranda =

Village in Frøya Municipality, Norway

- Village
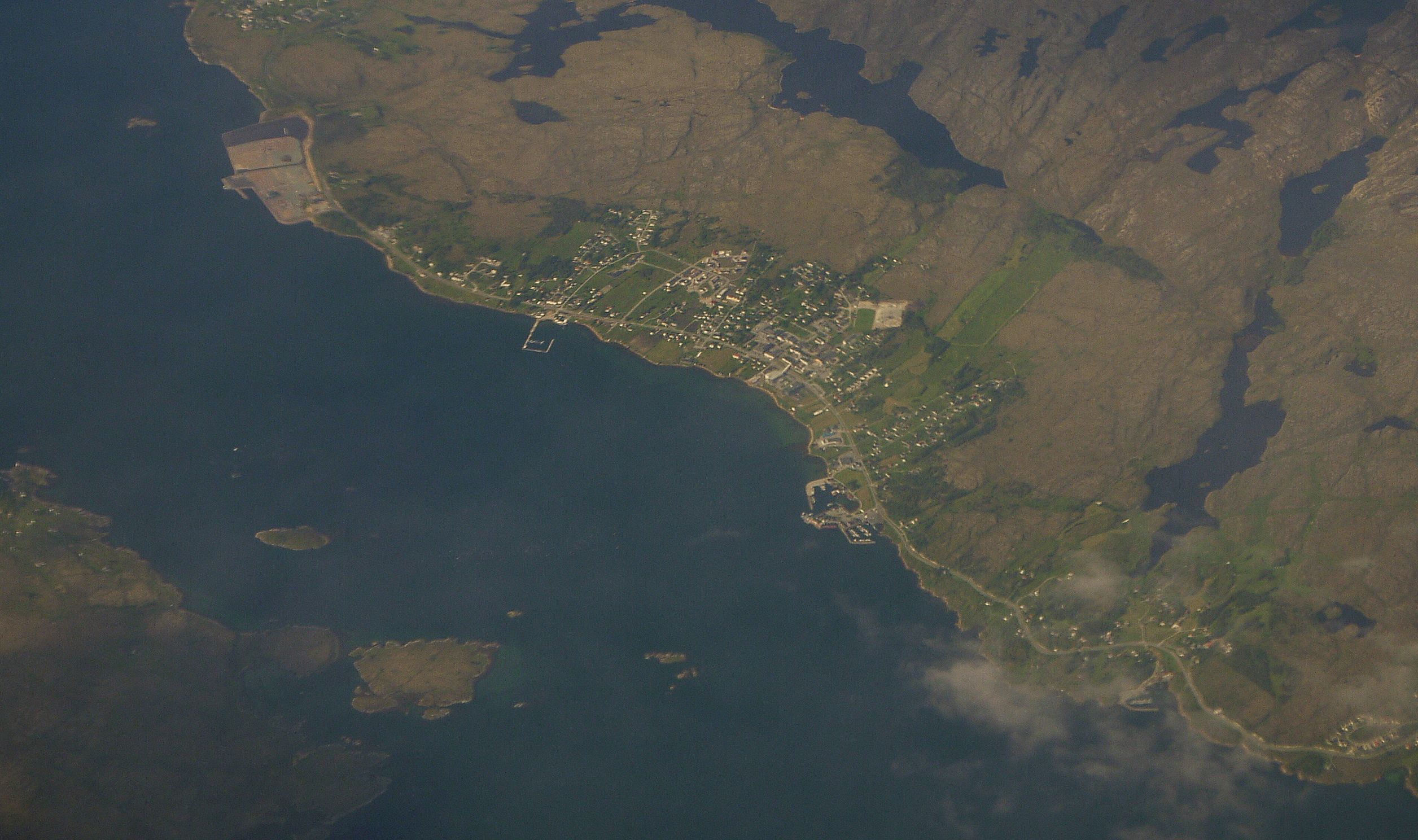
- View of the village
- Interactive map of Sistranda
- Location within Trøndelag Location within Norway
- Coordinates: 63.7252°N 08.8332°E
- Country: Norway
- Region: Central Norway
- County: Trøndelag
- District: Fosen
- Municipality: Frøya Municipality

Area
  - Total: 1.27 km^{2} (0.49 sq mi)
- Elevation: 12 m (39 ft)

Population (2024)
  - Total: 1,257
  - Density: 990/km^{2} (2,600/sq mi)
- Time zone: UTC+01:00 (CET)
  - Summer (DST): UTC+02:00 (CEST)
- Post Code: 7260 Sistranda

Sistranda is the administrative centre of Frøya Municipality in Trøndelag county, Norway. The village is located on the east side of the island of Frøya, about 4 kilometres (2.5 mi) north of the village of Hammarvika and the entrance to the Frøya Tunnel. The 1.27-square-kilometre (310-acre) village has a population (2024) of 1,257 and a population density of 990 inhabitants per square kilometre (2,600/sq mi).

Sistranda has schools representing all levels up to high school. It is also the centre of transportation on the island of Frøya, with buses to locations around the region and ferries with daily routes to Trondheim, Mausund, Sula, and Froan.

== Name ==
The village is named after the old Sistranda farm (Old Norse: Síða). The word síða means "side" (here in the sense of the "coast" or "side" of the island). The last element was added later. It is the definite form of strand which means "the beach" or "the shore". Today, the farm is divided into three parts: Yttersian (Outer-Sian), Midtsian (Middle-Sian), and Innersian (Inner-Sian).
