= Jan Otto Fredagsvik =

Norwegian politician

Jan Otto Fredagsvik (born 8 June 1947 in Frøya Municipality) is a Norwegian politician for the Labour Party.

Fredagsvik served as a deputy representative in the Norwegian Parliament from Sør-Trøndelag during the terms 1993–1997. From 1993 to 1996 he was brought in as a replacement representative for Gunhild Elise Øyangen, who was appointed to Brundtland's Third Cabinet.

On the local level Fredagsvik was a member of the municipal council for Frøya Municipality from 1971 to 2003, serving as mayor since 1987 except for his term as parliament member. He chaired the municipal party chapter in 1985–1987 and 2002–2004.
