= Frøya (island) =

Island in Trøndelag, Norway

- Interactive map of Frøya

Geography
- Location: Trøndelag, Norway
- Coordinates: 63.70184°N 8.63953°E
- Area: 151.9 km^{2} (58.6 sq mi)
- Length: 28 km (17.4 mi)
- Width: 12 km (7.5 mi)
- Highest elevation: 76 m (249 ft)
- Highest point: Besselvassheia

Administration
- Norway
- County: Trøndelag
- Municipality: Frøya Municipality

Frøya is an island in Frøya Municipality in Trøndelag county, Norway. The 152-square-kilometre (59 sq mi) island makes up about 63% of the land area of Frøya Municipality. The island lies in a large archipelago in the Frøyhavet sea, just northwest of the entrance to the Trondheimsfjorden. The Frøyfjorden lies to the south of the island and separates it from the large island of Hitra.

The island is rocky with heather-covered moorland as well as marshes and lakes. There are no naturally forested areas on the island. The highest point on the island is Besselvassheia, at 76 metres (249 ft) above sea level. The southern and eastern coasts are relatively smooth, but the northern coast is very jagged with many fjords and coves. Sletringen Lighthouse lies at the southwestern tip of the island.

The island is connected via the Frøya Tunnel to the neighboring island of Hitra. The island of Hitra is then connected to the mainland by the Hitra Tunnel.

== Name ==
The name of the island (and municipality) comes from Norse mythology. Although Frøya is a variant of the name of the Norse goddess Freyja, the Old Norse form of the name of the island was Frøy or Frey (the ending -a in the modern form is actually the feminine definite article – so the meaning of Frøya is 'the Frøy'). Therefore, the name of the island probably has the same root as the name of the Norse god Freyr, brother of Freyja. The names originally were titles: "lord" or "lady". The oldest meaning of the common word was "(the one) in front; the foremost, the leading" and here in the sense "the island in front of Hitra". Until 1906 the island and municipality name was spelled Frøien (-en is the masculine definite article in Norwegian).

== Media gallery ==
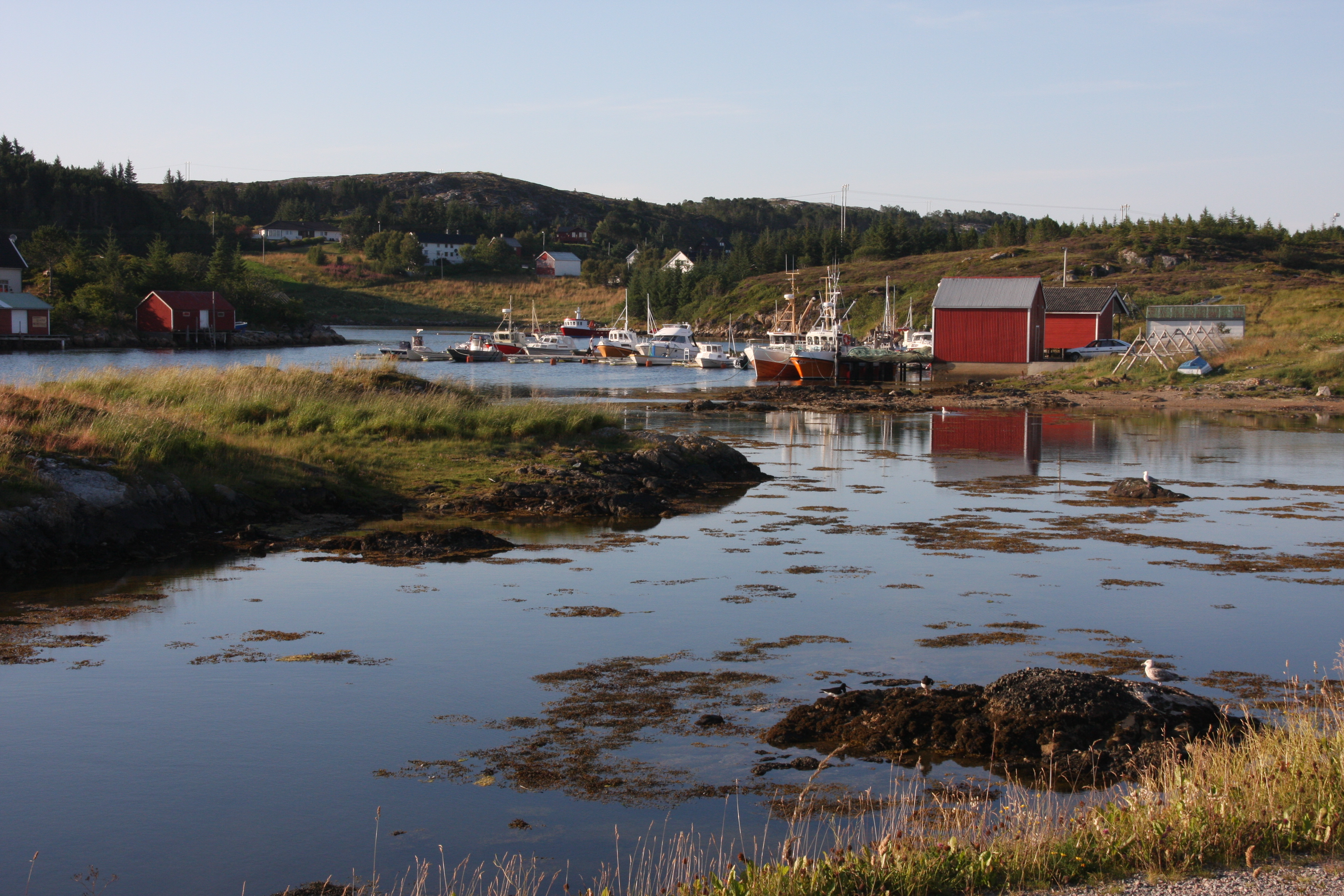
Flatval

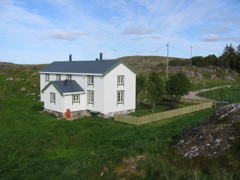
House on Frøya

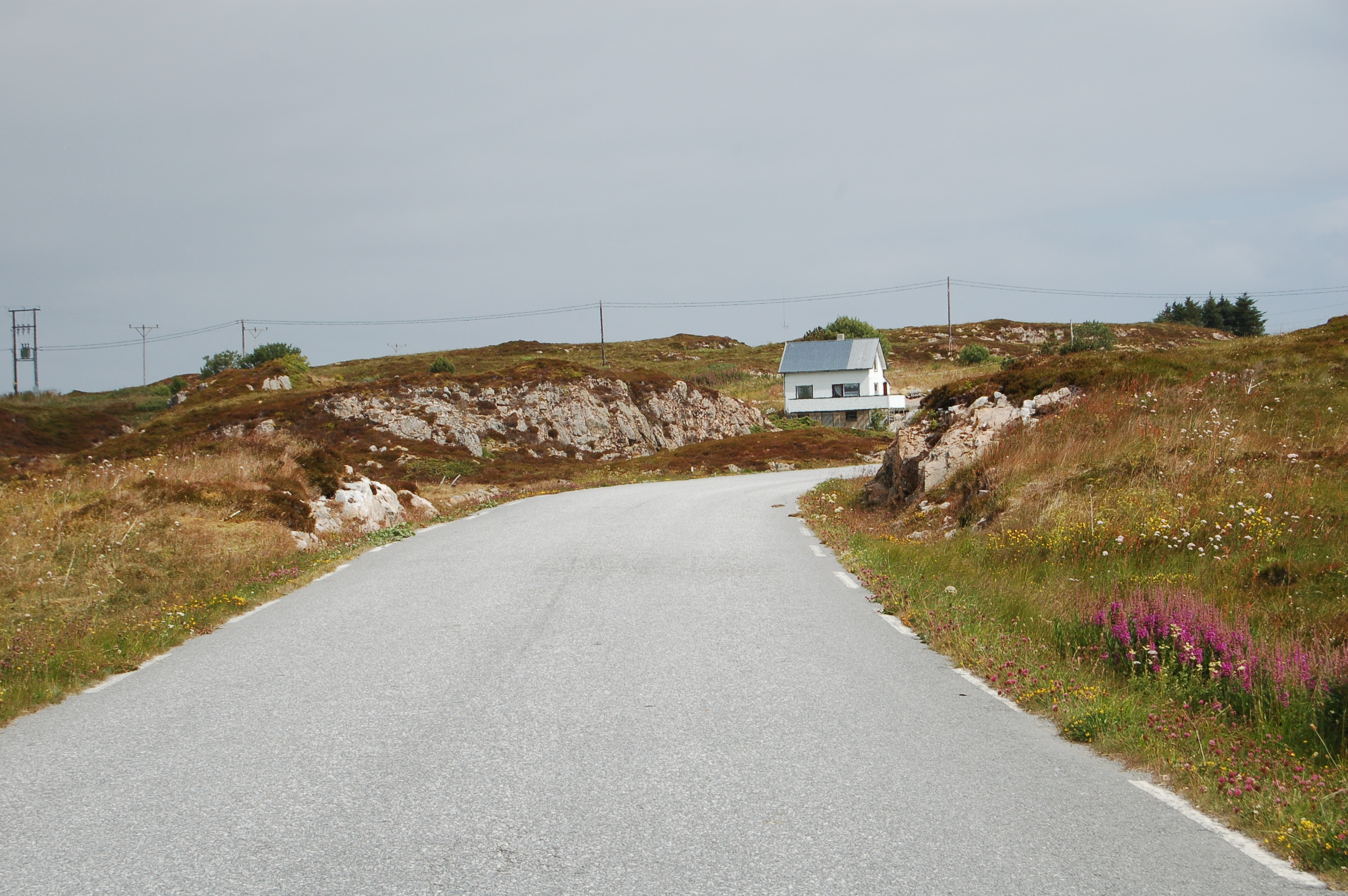
Road on Frøya

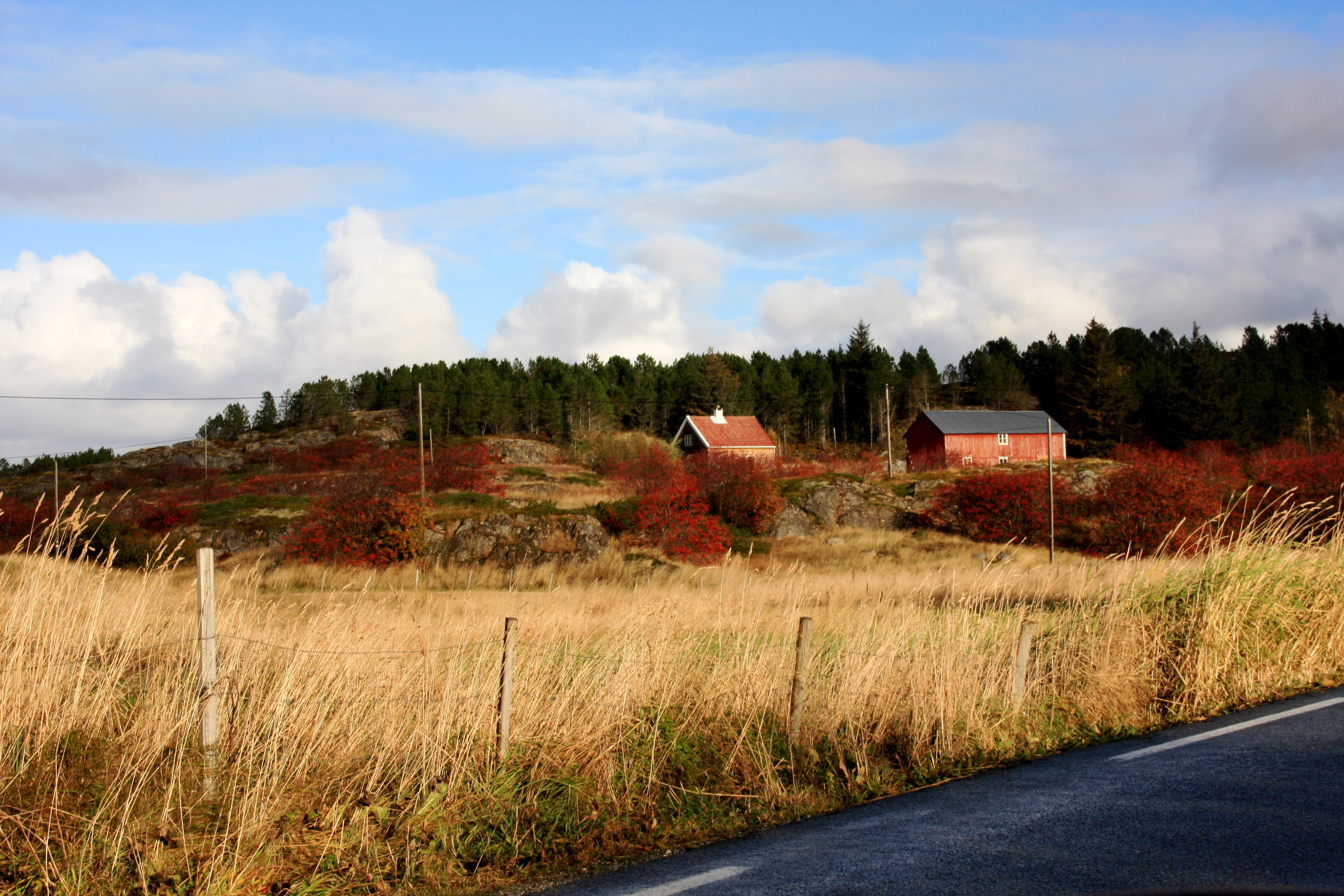
Husvika

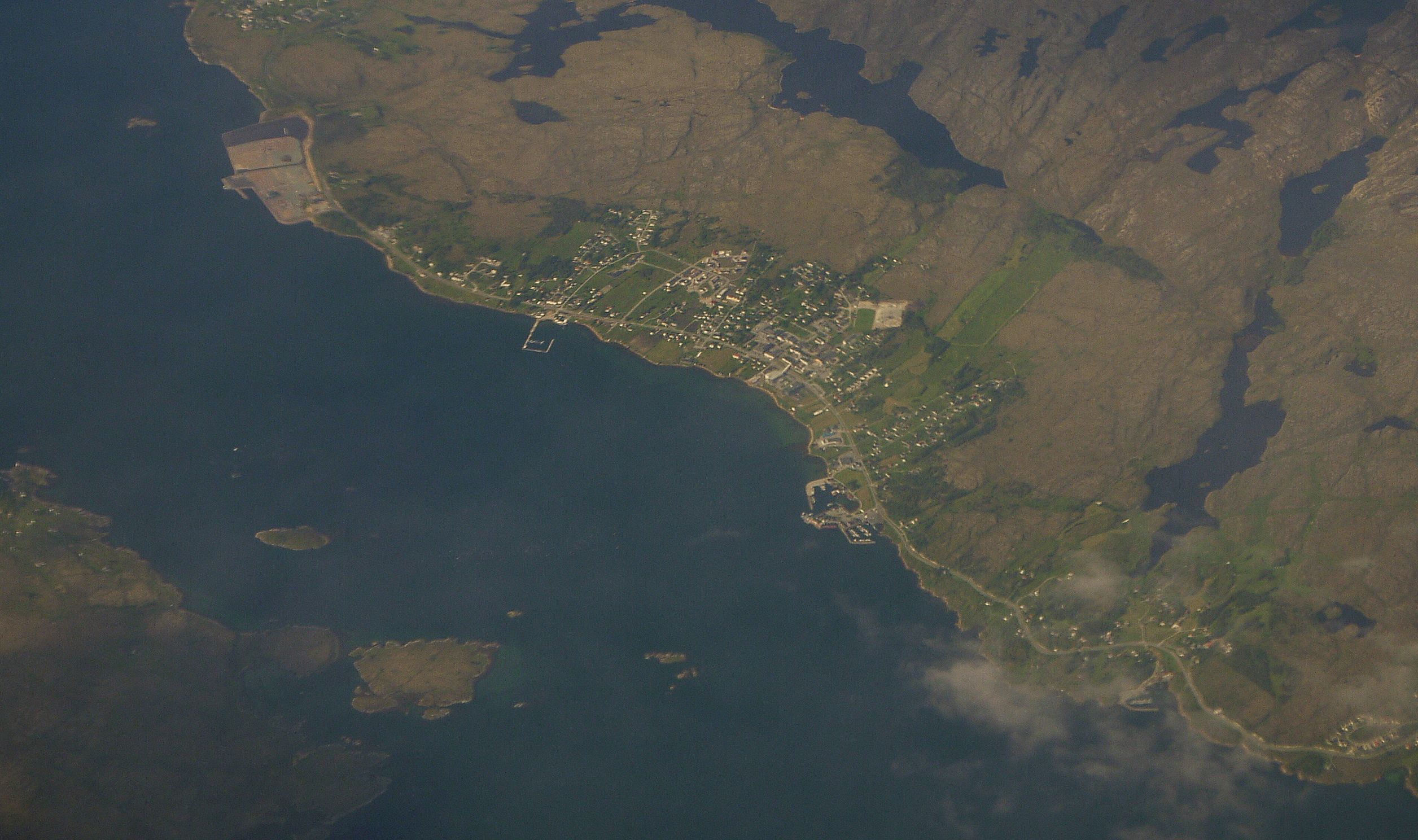
Sistranda

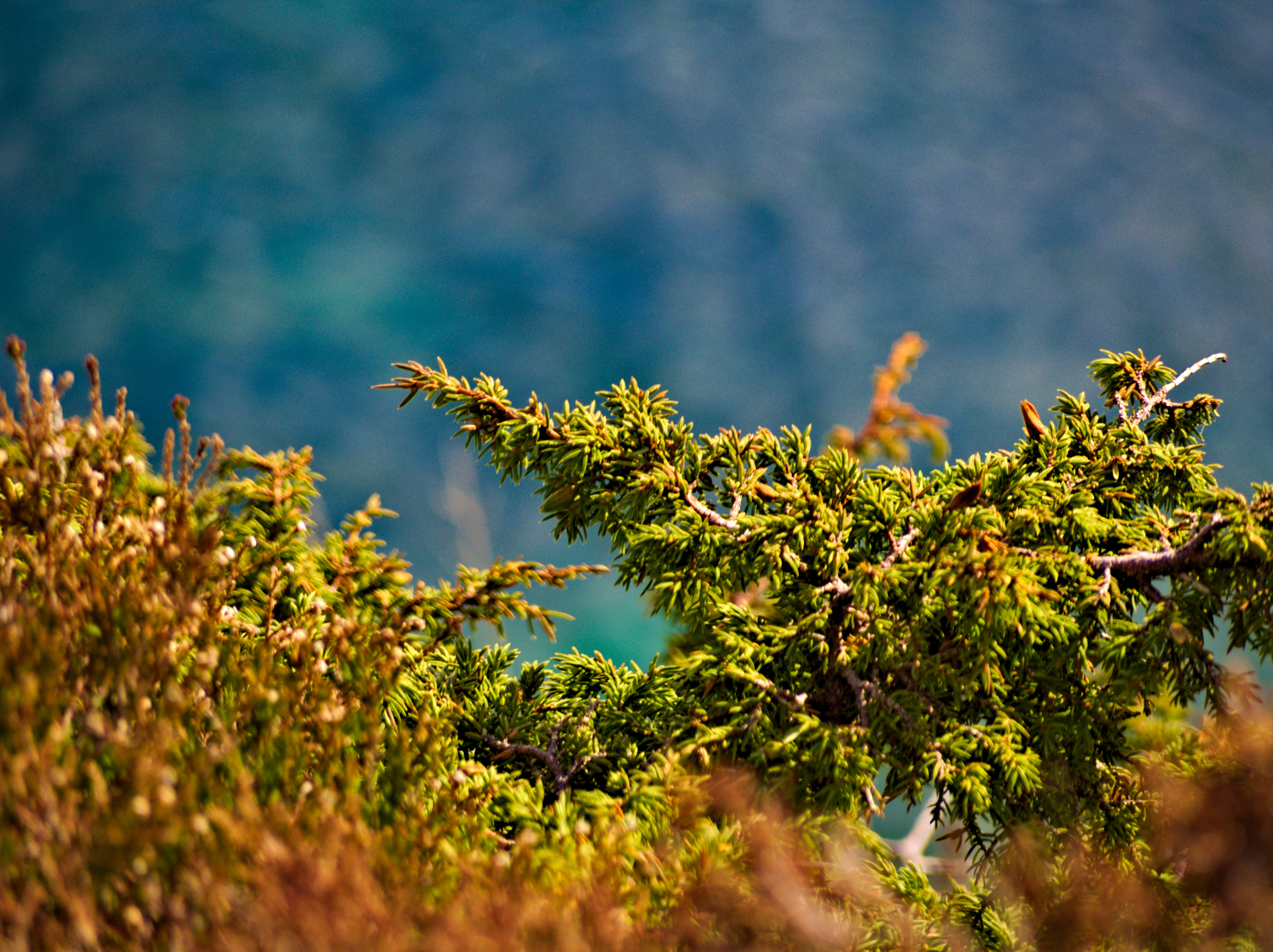
Plantlife on Frøya

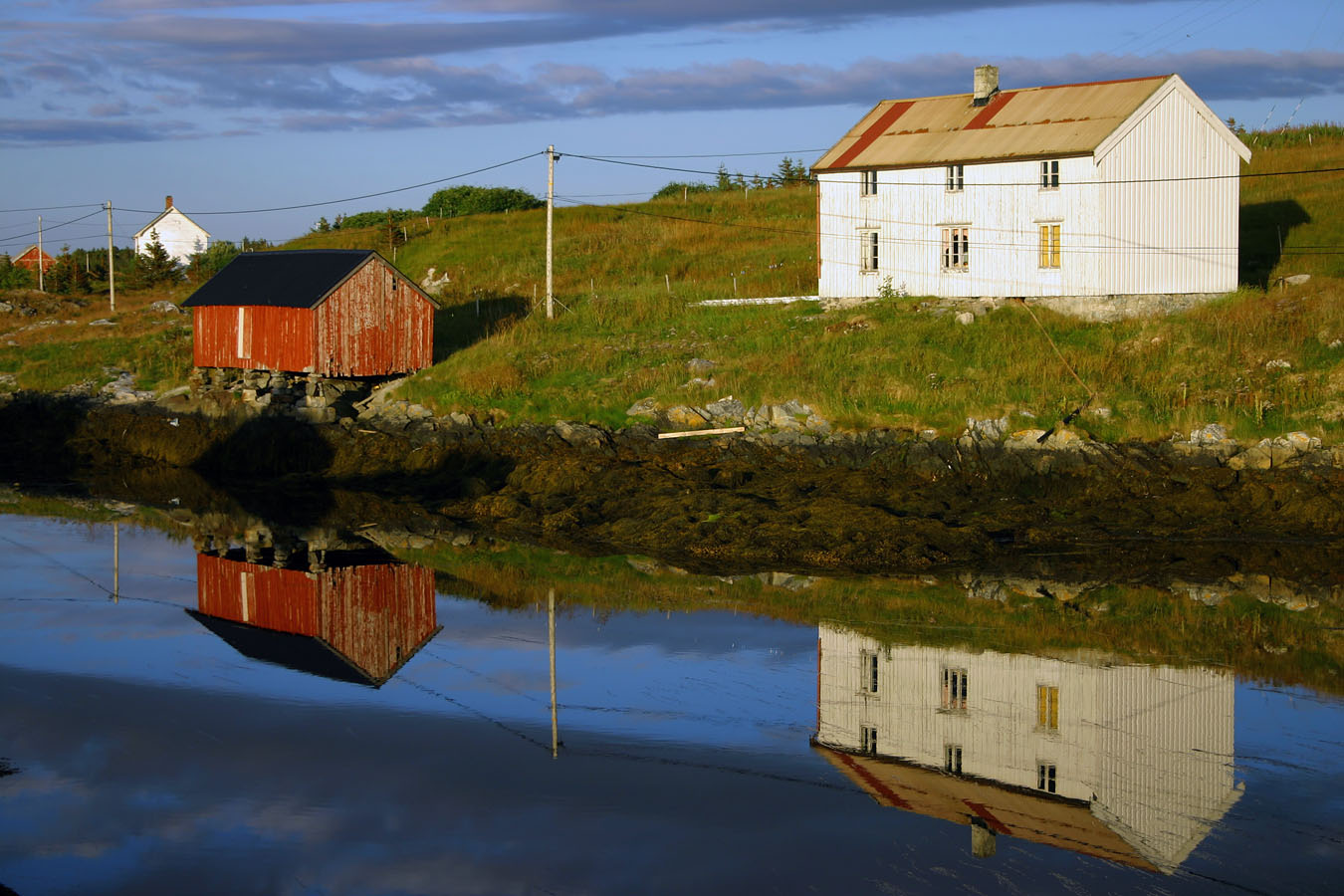
Houses in Titran

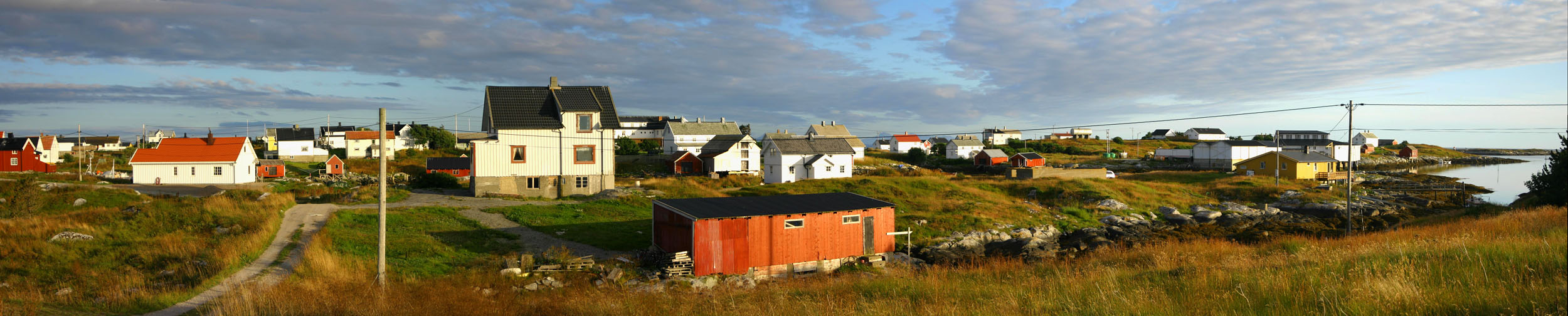
View of Titran

== See also ==
- List of islands of Norway
