= List of Norwegians by net worth =

The following Forbes list of Norwegian billionaires is based on an annual assessment of wealth and assets compiled and published by Forbes magazine in 2026.

== 2026 Norwegian billionaires list ==
Global ranking	Name	Net worth (USD)	Sources of wealth
1	Torstein Hagen	18.4 billion	Viking Cruises
2	Odd Reitan	9.1 billion	Reitan Group
3	Ole Andreas Halvorsen	8 billion	Viking Global Investors
4	Kjell Inge Røkke	7.7 billion	Aker ASA
5	Gustav Magnar Witzøe	4.5 billion	SalMar
6	Ivar Tollefsen	4.2 billion	Tollefsen Enterprises
7	Caroline Hagen Kjos	3.3 billion	Canica
8	Stein Erik Hagen	2.8 billion	Rimi
9	Arne Alexander Wilhelmsen	2.7 billion	Royal Caribbean Group
10	Peter Preben Wilhelmsen	2.7 billion	Royal Caribbean Group
11	Bent Wilhelmsen	2.7 billion	Royal Caribbean Group
12	Katharina Andresen	2.5 billion	Ferd
13	Alexandra Andresen	2.5 billion	Ferd
14	Petter Stordalen	2.2 billion	Nordic Choice Hotels
15	Wenaas Lars	2 billion	Wenaasgruppen
16	Helene Odfjell	1.7 billion	Odfjell Drilling
17	Erik Must	1.5 billion	Fondsfinans
18	Christian Sinding	1.5 billion	EQT AB

== See also ==
- Forbes list of billionaires
- List of countries by the number of billionaires
