= Emil Steen =

Emil Steen may refer to:

- Emil Steen (1828–1884), Norwegian ship-owner and businessperson
- Emil Steen (1887–1950), Norwegian businessperson
- Emil Steen (1870–1915), Norwegian businessperson
