= Nils Steen =

Norwegian businessman and politician

Nils Steen (19 February 1892 – 29 September 1968) was a Norwegian businessman.

== Personal life ==
He was born in Kristiania as a son of businessperson Christian Strøm Steen (1854–1932) and Lilli Bing (1865–1935). He was thus a brother of Emil Steen, grandson of Peter Emil Steen, nephew of Johan and Emil Steen, and a first cousin of Erling and Fredrik Steen.

In 1925 he married Wencke Mowinckel Wetlesen, daughter of an explosives company executive.

== Career ==
He took commercial education in Norway and abroad, and was hired in the family company Steen & Strøm in 1919. Together with his first cousin Erling Steen and Eyvind Strøm, who both too entered the company in the 1910s, he took over the leadership in the 1930s. Nils Steen became director in 1932. After becoming chief executive in 1960 he retired in 1964, but continued as chairman of the board.

During the occupation of Norway by Nazi Germany, acting chief executive Nils Steen and chairman Erling Steen abide by the trade policies of the occupiers. Erling Steen was imprisoned for a period, and in May 1943 the wholesaling and retailing departments of Steen & Strøm were shut down by the authorities.

He was a supervisory council member of Oslo Sparebank from 1943 to 1953, and in the enterprise organizations he was a board member of Handelens Arbeidsgiverforening from 1938 to 1948, of Oslo Manufakturkjøbmenns Forening from 1946 to 1947 and their representative in Oslo Chamber of Commerce from 1945 to 1951. He resided at Gjettum farm since 1932, and was a member of Bærum municipal council from 1948 to 1951, elected on a joint list of the Conservative and Agrarian parties.

He was decorated with the King's Medal of Merit in gold in 1964. He died in September 1968.
