= Brahesborg =

Manor house and estate in southeastern Denmark

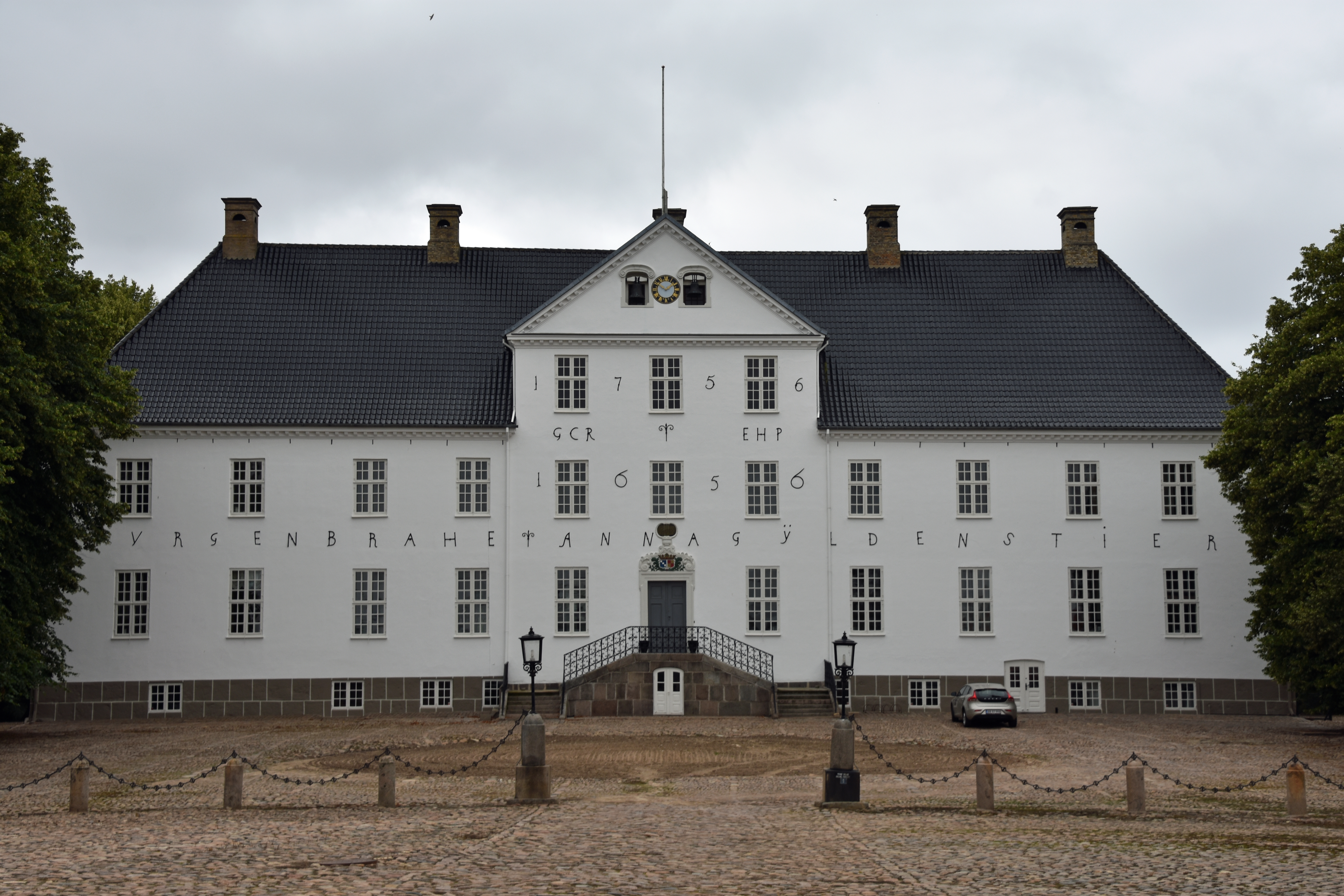
- The main building.
- Interactive map of the Brahesborg area

General information
- Location: Assens Municipality, Denmark
- Coordinates: 55°16′49.4″N 9°57′6.19″E
- Completed: 17th century
- Renovated: 1756

Brahesborg is a manor house situated northeast of Assens on the island of Funen, Denmark. The main building was constructed for Jørgen Brahe in the middle of the 17th century, but owes its current appearance to a renovation undertaken by Christian Rantzau in 1756. The estate was acquired by Frederik Wilhelm Treschow in 1828 and remained in the hands of members of the Treschow family until 1951. The main building was listed on the Danish register of protected buildings and places in 1918.

The estate currently covers 1,407 hectares of land (including Wilhelmsborg).

== History ==
The original name of the estate was Bisbo. During the Middle Ages it belonged to the bishops of Odense. It was later acquired by their fiefholder Verner Berthelsen Svale. After his death in 1560, it was passed to his son, Christen Svale. It was later acquired by Ove Bille.

=== Brahe family ===
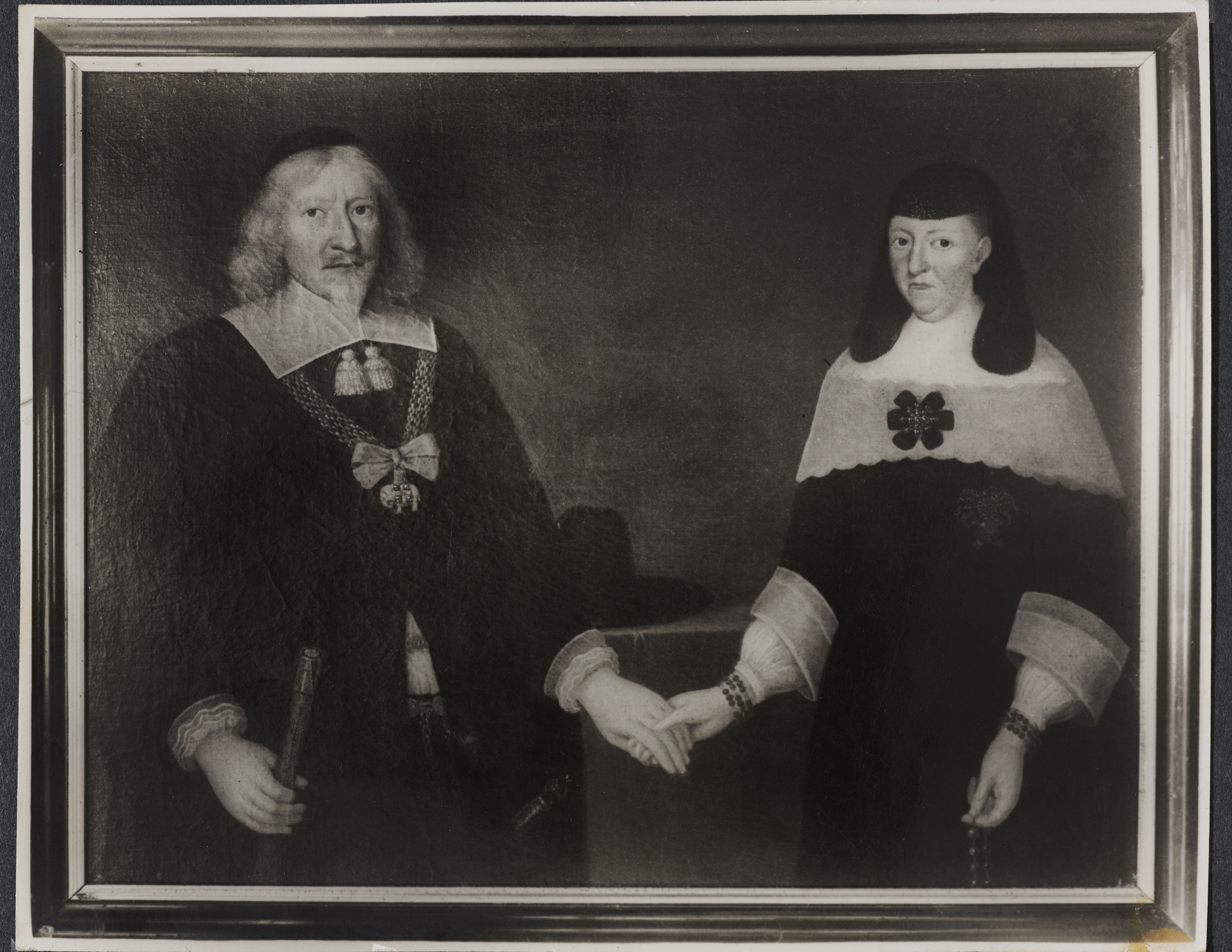
Jørgen Brahe and Anne Gyldenstierne

In 1618, Bille's unmarried daughters ceded Bisbo to Jørgen Brahe in exchange for Skovgaard. Jørgen Brahe renamed the estate Brahesborg. Brahe was one of the largest landowners on Funen. He was a leading figure in the Danish Rigsråd. His widow, Anne Gyldenstierne, kept the estate after his death in 1771. After her death in 1677, it was passed to her granddaughters, Anne and Sophie Brahe.

Sophie Brahe's daughter, Jytte Dorothea Brahe, was married to Marcus Gøye, headmaster of Gerlufsholm School. In 1693, he became the sole owner of Brahesborg. Shortly thereafter, he embarked on refurbishing the main building.

=== Rantzau family ===
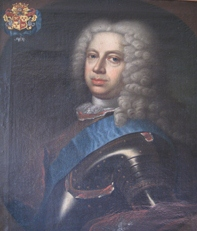
Christian Rantzau

As Gøye had no sons, Brahesborg therefore passed to his daughter Charlotte Amalie Gøye. She was married to the influential statesman Christian Rantzau. In the 1730s, Rantzau served as Governor-General of Norway. His other holdings included Rosenvold, Asdal, Hammelmose, and Krengerup. In 1740, he succeeded Christian Christophersen Sehested as county governor of Odense and several counties. He lived at St. Canute's Abbey among the largest buildings in Odense. For 20 years he governed his counties, resigning in 1760. He died in 1771 at Brahesborg in Fyn. Rantzau created a substantial library at Brahesborg.

After Rantzau's death, Brahesborg passed to his son Carl Adolf Rantzau. He implemented many of the important agrarian reforms of the time on the estate. He also had to spend large sums on carrying out another refurbishment of the building. Carl August Rantzau left Brahesborg to his nephew Christian Adolf Rantzau, who subsequently went bankrupt in 1822. Brahesborg was then taken over by the government.

=== Treschow family ===
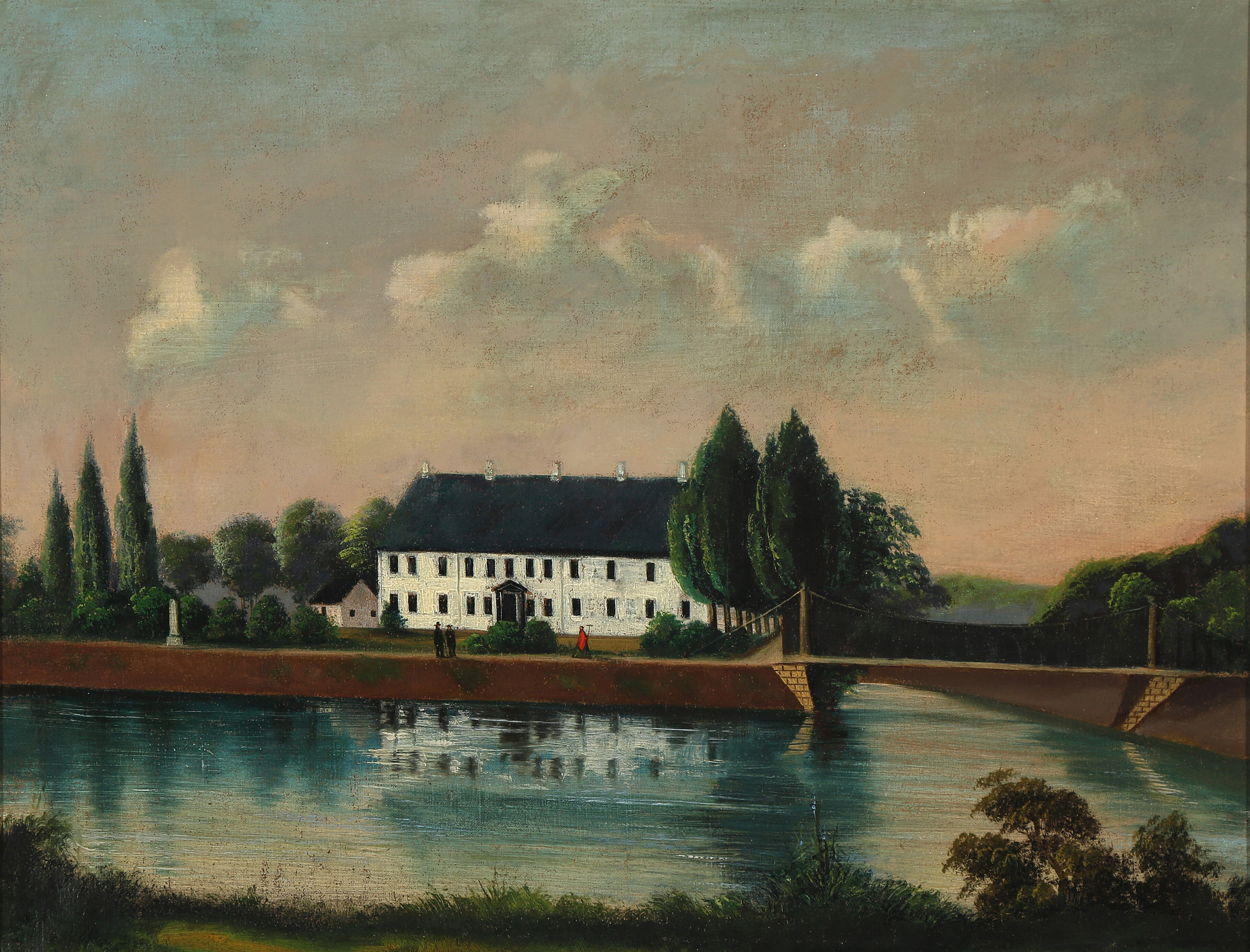
Brahesborg in the 19th century

In 1828, Brahesborg was sold to the Supreme Court attorney Frederik Wilhelm Treschow. He refurbished the building and improved the management of the estate. Treschow had also acquired Fritzøe in Norway. In 1854, he decided to divide the estates between his two sons. Brahesborg went to his adopted son Frederik Wilhelm Rosenkilde Treschow. Officially his wife's son by her first marriage, it is believed that he was in fact Treschow's biological son. It was at least the only child from her wife's first marriage that was adopted by Treschow and it is also striking that he was named after him. Frederik Wilhelm Rosenkilde Treschow's son Carl Adolf Rothe Treschow was married to Henriette Sophie Margrethe Elisabeth Rantzau.

=== Cederfeld de Simonsen family ===
In 1951, Brahesborg passed out of the Treschow family. This happened when it was taken over by Carl Adolf Cederfeld de Simonsen, who inherited it from his aunt, a sister of Frederik Wilhelm Treschow.

== Architecture ==
The main building is a simple two-storey building with a hiped roof clad in red tile. The facade features a three-storey median risalit, tipped by a triangular pediment. The cast iron suspension bridge was created at Treschow's ironworks in Norway in the 1870s.

== List of owners ==
- Bishops of Odense, 1400–1530
- Verner Bertelsen Svale, 1530–1560
- Christen Vernersen Svale, 1560–1591
- Unknown owner, 1591–1600
- Johan Macchabæus, 1600–?
- Ove Bille, ?–1618
- Karen Ovesdatter Bille, 1618–?
- Hilleborg Ovesdatter Bille, 1618–?
- Jørgen Steensen Brahe, 1638–1667
- Anne Brahe née Gyldenstierne, 1667–1677
- Anne Steensdatter Rosenkrantz née Brahe, 1677–?
- Anne Helvig Knudsdatter Thott, 1677–?
- Sophie Knudsdatter Thott, 1677–?
- Jytte Dorothea Knudsdatter Gøye née Thott, 1677–?
- Holger Rosenkrantz, ?–1694
- Marcus Gøye, ?–1698
- Charlotte Amalie Marcusdatter Due née Gøye, 1698–1708
- Manderup Due, 1708–1710
- Charlotte Amalie Marcusdatter Rantzau née Gøye, 1710–1716
- Christian Rantzau, 1716–1771
- Carl Adolph Rantzau, 1771–1814
- Christian Adolf Rantzau, 1814–1827
- The Danish State, 1827–1828
- Frederik Christian Berg, 1828–1833
- Frederik Wilhelm Treschow, 1828–1854
- Frederik Wilhelm Rosenkilde Treschow, 1854–1869
- Carl Adolf Frederiksen Rothe Treschow, 1869–1911
- Frederik Wilhelm Carlsen Treschow, 1911–1951
- Carl Adolf Cederfeld de Simonsen, 1951–1963
- Ivar Brorsen Cederfeld de Simonsen, 1963–1981
- Peter Cederfeld de Simonsen, 1981–present
