= Emil Steen (1887–1950) =

Norwegian businessman

Emil Steen (29 March 1887 – 1950) was a Norwegian businessman.

He was born in Kristiania as a son of businessman Christian Strøm Steen (1854–1932) and Lilli Bing (1865–1935). He was thus a brother of Nils Steen, grandson of Peter Emil Steen, nephew of Johan and Emil Steen, and a first cousin of Erling and Fredrik Steen.

He finished Kristiania Commerce School in 1908. In 1912 he was hired as a wholesaler in Harald Ohlsen & Co. He became a co-owner of the company in 1916. In 1926 he became chief executive of Sætre Kjeksfabrikk.

He was a board member of Steen & Strøm and Norges Hypotekforening for Næringslivet, national board member of the Federation of Norwegian Industries, supervisory council member of Christiania Bank og Kreditkasse, Christiania Spigerverk, Holter-Sørensens Tankrederi, Hippodromen AS, and Forsikringsselskapet Norden. He was also a deputy member of the national price committee for liquor after the Second World War.

Together with Ragnhild Berg he had the son Christian Steen, who became chief executive of Steen & Strøm. Emil Steen died in October 1950. Marshals at his funeral were Harald Borchgrevink and Mogens Christensen.
