= Steen & Strøm Magasin =

Steen og Strøm
- Location within Norway

General information
- Type: Shopping Centre
- Location: Oslo
- Coordinates: 59°54′43″N 10°44′34″E

Website
- https://steenogstromoslo.no

Steen & Strøm Magasin is a department store situated in Nedre Slottsgate in the center of Oslo, Norway. The department store has over 500 Norwegian and international brands. Steen & Strøm Magasin consists of over 33,000 square meters of floor spaces.

== History ==
Steen & Strøm was founded in 1797 when Samuel Strøm established a little wine and food delicatessen at the corner of Kongens Gate and Prinsens Gate. Strøm bought the two story high, 250 square foot store for 1,700 riksdaler.

In 1856, Samuel Strøm Jr. and Emil Steen took over the firm and renamed it "Steen & Strøm". Business was booming, so the partners bought the house next door in Prinsens Gate and, in 1874, they opened a four-story department store, the first modern department store in Norway. Here, customers could find beauty articles, fashion, the latest technology and cafés.

In 1929, the building was destroyed by fire. The architect Ole Sverre was commissioned to design a new, spacious and open building, inspired by the large department stores in Paris. In 1930, the new Steen & Strøm store opened. The shopping center, with Norway's first escalators, quickly became an attraction.

During the occupation of Norway by Nazi Germany, the acting chief executive Nils Steen and the chairman Erling Steen refused to abide by the trade policies of the occupiers. Erling Steen was imprisoned for a period and, in May 1943, Steen & Strøm were shut down by the Nazis.

In 1992, the department store went bankrupt. Peter Anker Stordalen and a group of other investors bought the estate and continued to run the department store. In 2005, Steen & Strøm was bought by Storebrand Eiendom.

In July 2011, Steen & Strøm was purchased by Søylen Eiendom and Schage Eiendom for over one billion NOK. The new owners wanted to revitalize and upgrade the venerable department store with new retailing and dining experiences.

In 2015, the privately held real estate investment management firm, Meyer Bergman, bought 11 properties of Søylen's Norwegian portfolio, including Steen & Strøm for NOK 5.3 billion.
