= Canica =

Norwegian holding company

Canica AS
- Type: Private
- Industry: Investments
- Founded: 1985
- Headquarters: Oslo, Norway
- Area served: Norway
- Key people: Peter Arne Ruzicka (CEO); Stein Erik Hagen (Chairman)
- Revenue: ▲NOK 2,681 million (2006)
- Operating income: NOK -59 million (2006)
- Net income: NOK 602 million (2006)
- Number of employees: 18 (2012)
- Parent: Stein Erik Hagen (10%); Caroline Hagen Kjos (30%); Carl Erik Hagen (30%); Nina Camilla Hagen (30%)
- Website: www.canica.no

Canica is a private holding company, based in Oslo, Norway, created to own the RIMI grocery store chain, owned by Stein Erik Hagen (10%) and his three children Caroline Marie Hagen, Carl Erik Hagen and Nina Camilla Hagen (30% each). The company is the largest owner of Orkla (17.4%), Jernia (100%), Komplett (56.21%), Ignis and Steen & Strøm (49.9%). The company was founded in 1985 to own the RIMI grocery store chain that Hagen had started. This was sold to ICA in 2004.
