= Paul Franke =

Paul Franke or Francke may refer to:

- Paul Francke (architect) (died 1615), German Renaissance architect
- Paul Francke (musician) (born 1979), American songwriter and instrumentalist
- Paul Franke (tenor) (1917–2011), American operatic tenor
- Paul Franke (figure skater) (1888–1950), German figure skater

== See also ==
- Paul Frank (born 1967), American cartoonist, artist and fashion designer
- Paul Christian Frank (1879–1956), Norwegian jurist and politician
