= Mille-Marie Treschow =

Norwegian estate owner and businesswoman (1954–2018)

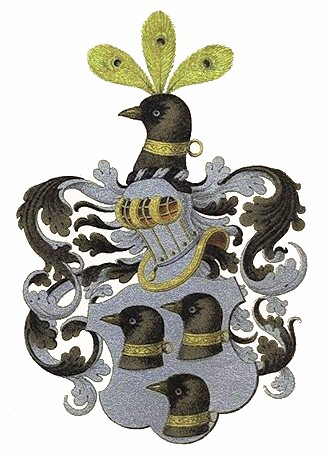
- Coat of arms of the Treschow family
- Born: 3 April 1954; Larvik, Norway
- Died: 29 September 2018 (aged 64); Tønsberg, Norway
- Noble family: Treschow
- Father: Aage Gerhard Treschow
- Mother: Nanna, née Meidell
- Occupation: Estate owner

Mille-Marie Treschow (3 April 1954 – 29 September 2018) was a Norwegian estate owner and businesswoman. She was known for her marriage to Stein Erik Hagen, well known as "Rimi-Hagen", being the former owner of the Rimi chain of low-cost discount stores.

== Family ==
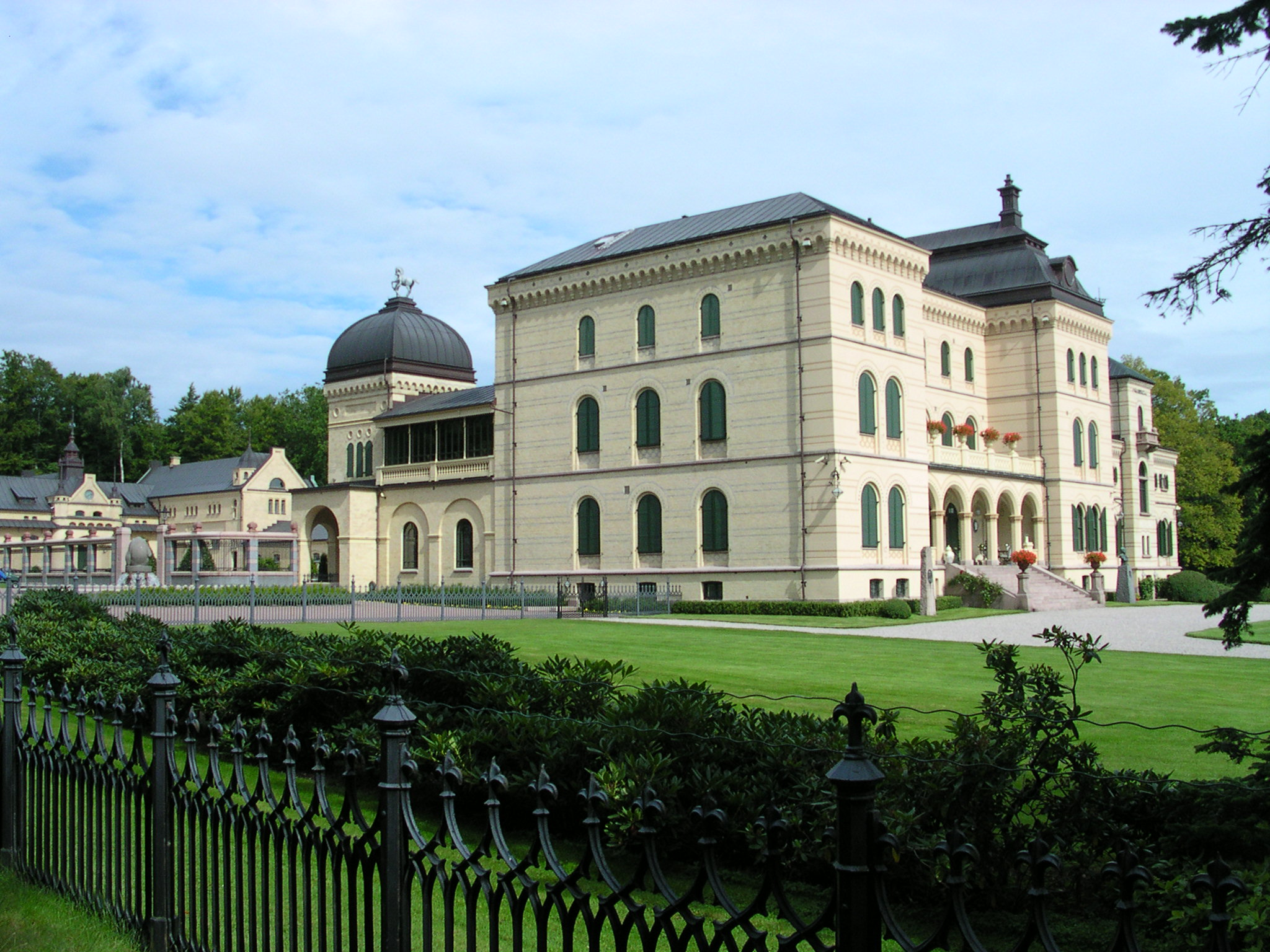
Fritzøehus, built late 19th century

Treschow was the daughter of estate owner Gerhard Aage Treschow (1923–2001) and Nanna, née Meidell (born 1926). She was named for her paralyzed aunt Marie Treschow (1913–1952). She belonged to the Treschow family, which was formerly noble, having bought the status of untitled lower nobility (cf. Briefadel) in the 19th century in Denmark.

She was married three times and had two children in her second marriage (1984–2000), with Andreas Stang. In 2004 she married businessman Stein Erik Hagen. In 2012 they announced their separation.

== Education and business ==
Treschow was a pupil at Croft House School in Dorset, England. She also had Norwegian examen artium. She received a Master of Business Administration in Switzerland, and had additional economic studies in the United States and home economics studies in France.

Based in Larvik, Treschow managed Treschow Fritzøe, an extensive consortium consisting of properties and forest. She owned a private estate and resided at Fritzøehus Manor in Larvik. Succeeding her father in 1986, she was of the 6th generation owning and running the family industry.

Treschow had an estimated private fortune of 1.5 billion Norwegian kroner (NOK) or about US$250 million. She was as such one of the wealthiest women in Norway. Her husband, Stein Erik Hagen, is worth about 10 billion NOK or about US$2 billion.

== Death ==
Treschow died aged 64 on 29 September 2018 at Tønsberg hospital of an undisclosed illness.
