= Kjos (disambiguation) =

Kjos, Kjøs or Kjós may refer to:

- Kjos or Kjøs, Norwegian surname
- Kjos (Kristiansand), Norway
- Kjós or Kjósarhreppur, Icelandic municipality

== See also ==
- Kjose
