= Fredrik Steen =

Fredrik Steen (6 September 1895 – 22 October 1970) was a Norwegian pharmacist and businessperson.

He was a son of Emil Steen and Laura Steen. He was a grandson of Emil Steen (1829–1884), a nephew of Johan and Christian Steen and a first cousin of Erling Steen.

Several family members were owners of Steen & Strøm, but Fredrik Steen's father had become a partner in the pharmaceutical wholesaling company Nyegaard & Co. His father was the sole owner of this company from 1913, and transformed it from a wholesaling company to a manufacturer of pharmaceutical products. However, he died in 1915. Fredrik's mother Laura ran the company until 1921, when Fredrik took over. He orchestrated a merger with Koren & Gedde and brought that company's owner Sverre Blix on board as co-owner.

Fredrik Steen had taken the cand.pharm. degree in 1916, and been an assistant at the Royal Frederick University. By 1921 he was the manager of both Nyegaard & Co and Koren & Gedde, and alternated every second year with Sverre Blix in being chairman of the board of Nyegaard & Co. He was also a board member of Koren & Gedde and A/S Para. Steen retired in 1960.

He was a vice chairman of Norsk Farmaceutisk Selskap. He was also involved in dog breeding, most specifically of English Setters. He died in October 1970.
