= Peter Arne Ruzicka =

Norwegian businessperson (born 1964)

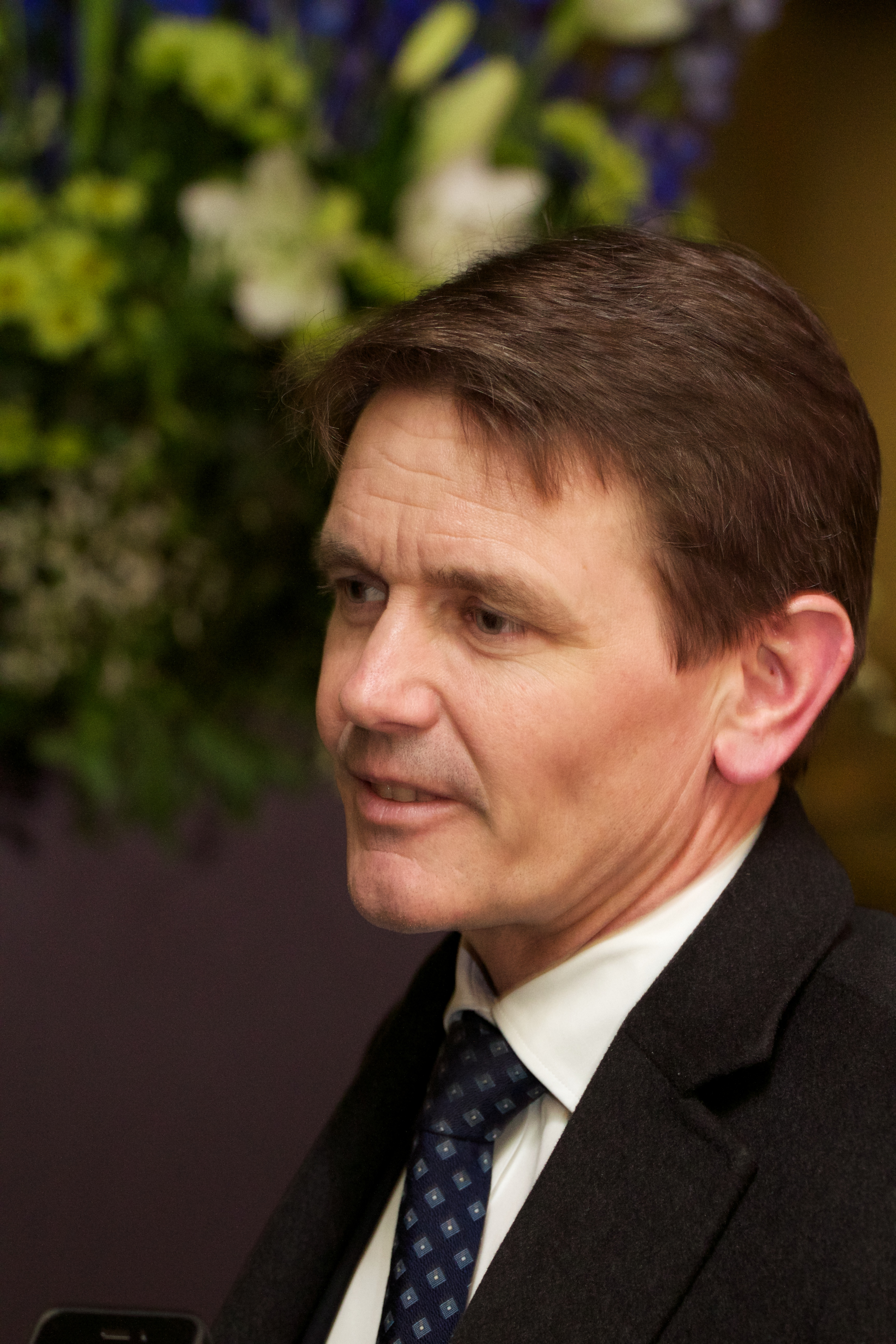
Peter A. Ruzicka (2014)

Peter Arne Ruzicka (born 16 April 1964) is a Norwegian businessman.

Ruzicka's father was Czech, migrated to Norway in 1951 and ultimately became professor of chemistry. Ruzicka earned siv.øk. and MBA degrees at Oslo Business School. In 1990, he was hired at Hakon Gruppen by Stein Erik Hagen. He became director of markets in RIMI after nine months, and successively became CEO of RIMI and Hakon Gruppen. From 2000 to 2003 Ruzicka was the CEO of Ahold in the Czech Republic and Slovakia. He then left the conglomerate together with Stein Erik Hagen. Instead, Ruzicka became CEO of Jernia in 2003 and Canica in 2006.

Since February 2014, Mr. Ruzicka has been president and CEO of Orkla.
