= Treschows Stiftelse =

Building in Copenhagen, Denmark

Coordinates: 55°40′29″N 12°35′48″E

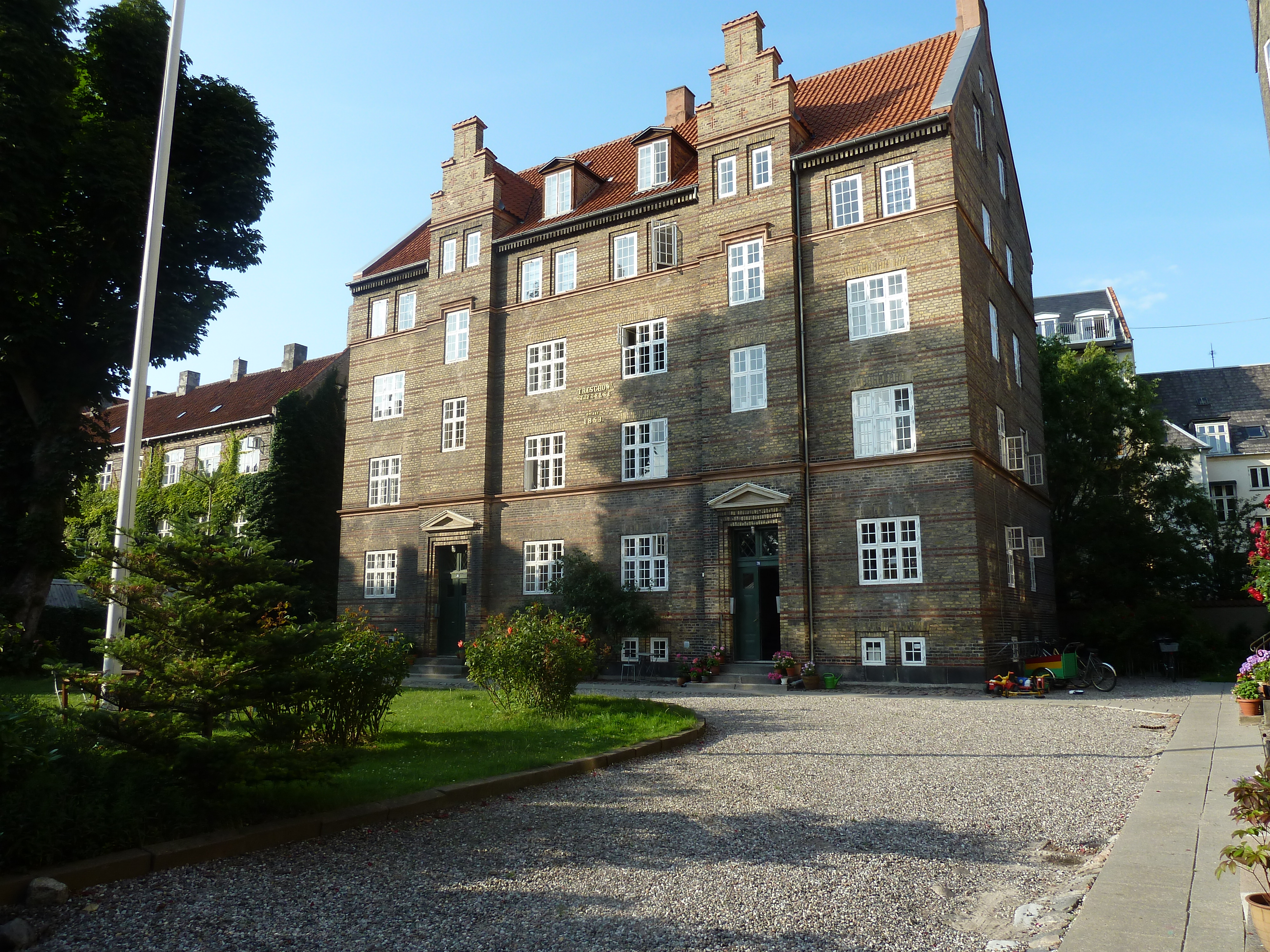
Treschows Stiftelse

Treschows Stiftelse is a listed, philanthropical housing complex in the Christianshavn district of Copenhagen, Denmark.

== History ==
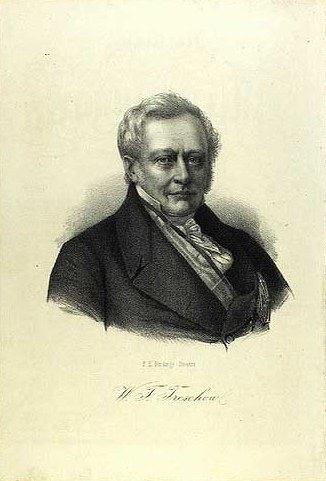
Frederik Treschow

The site was one of two homes for needy women which were built by the politician and supreme court attorney Frederik Treschow. He administrated numerous trusts, including Admiral Winterfeldts Stiftelse "Trøstens Bolig" which provided affordable housing for needy women. This may have inspired him to build similar facilities at his own expense. The first was built in the courtyard behind the Admiral building in 1847. The next was built in Christianshavn and consisted of two buildings completed in 1853 and 1857 to designs by Christian Tybjerg. In 1859, Treschow founded Det Treschow'ske Fideikommis (The Treschow Foundation)).

== Buildings ==
The two buildings at Christianshavn are situated at a somewhat hidden location at the end of a narrow alleyway off Overgaden over Vandet, the street which runs along the southeast side of Christianshavn Canal, where they have their address at Nos. 76–82. They front a courtyard with a small garden complex which is closed on the two remaining sides by a wall and a fence. The complex was listed in 1983.

== Gallery ==
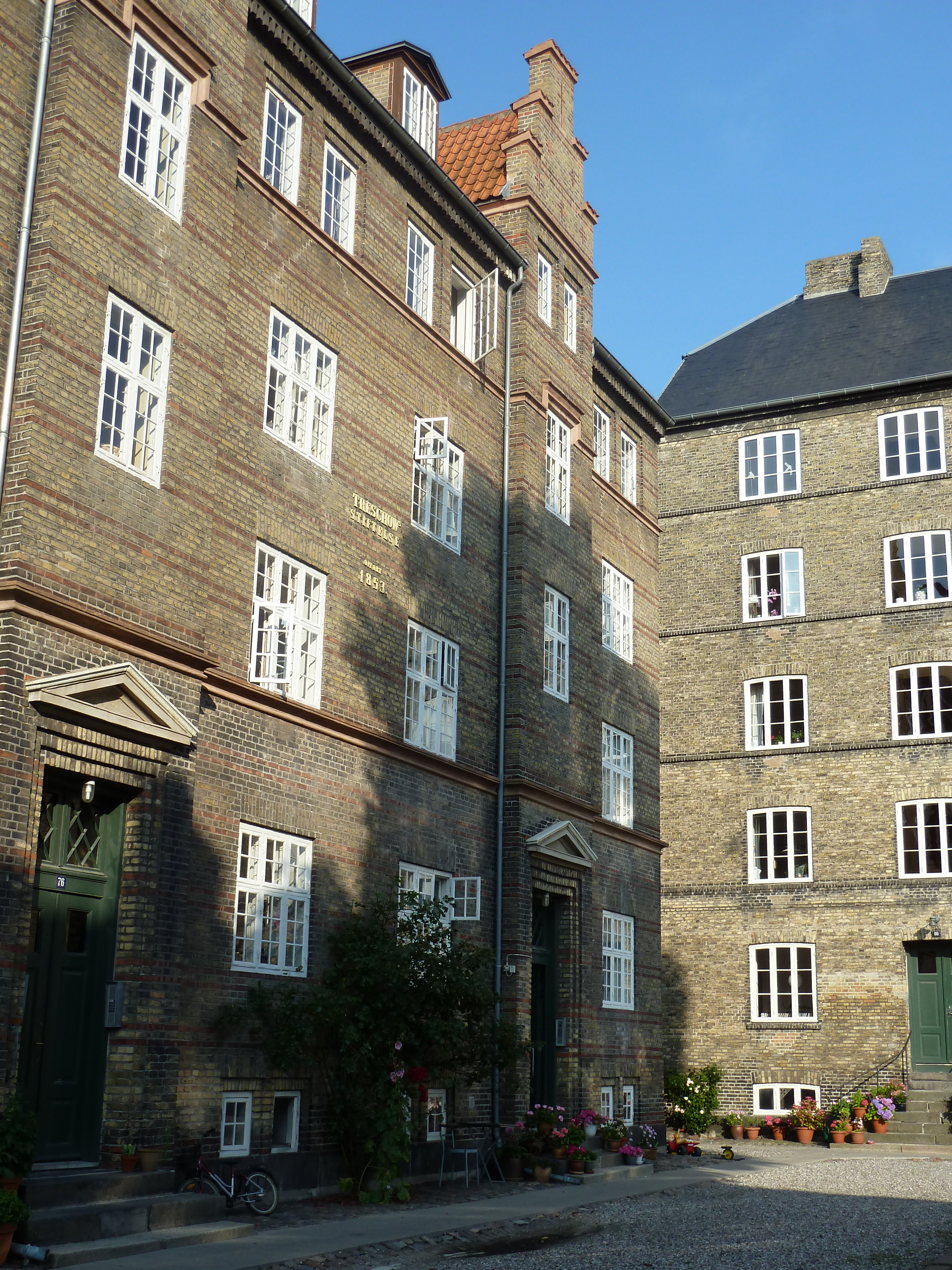
Treschows Stiftelse

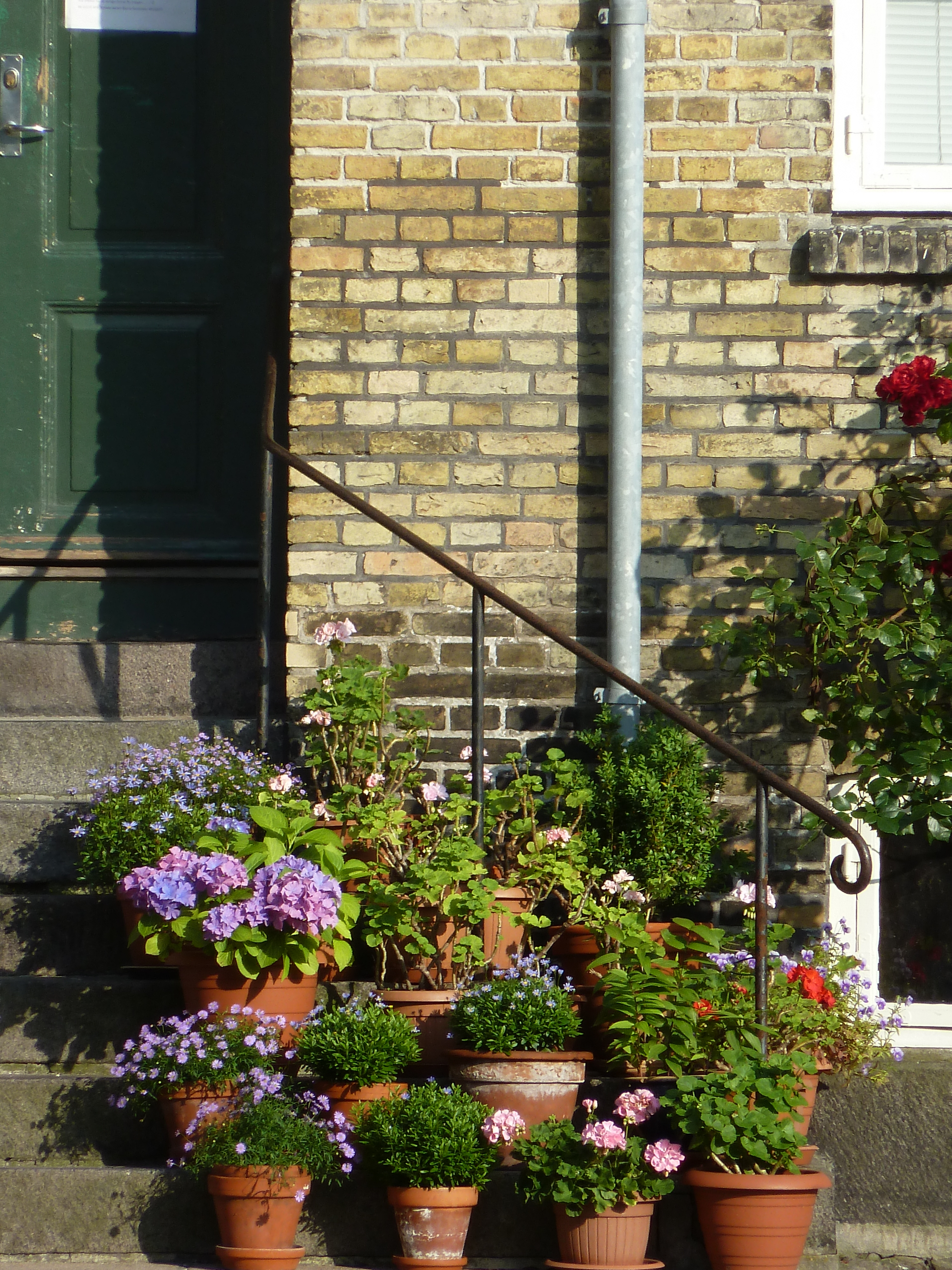
The steps

== See also ==
- Jørgen Balthazar Winterfeldt
