= Søylen Eiendom =

Søylen Eiendom is a Norwegian property group, owned by Carl Erik Krefting, Runar Vatne and Hans Petter Krohnstad, with headquarters in Oslo. The group has over 250 leases with restaurants and shops in Oslo, and manages a real estate portfolio of 250 000 square meters, in addition to approximately 30,000 square meters abroad. In 2010 the Søylen Group made a profit of 66 million NOK and revenues of 340 million NOK. Chairman of the board is Runar Vatne.

== History ==
Søylen Eiendom was founded in 2004 and is the parent company of the Søylen Group consisting of a large number of real estate companies.

=== Posthallen ===
In 2008 Søylen Eiendom and Schage Eiendom bought the 19,000-square-foot Posthallen Kvadraturen in Oslo. Posthallen consists of clothing stores, houses, furniture shops and restaurants.

=== Eger Karl Johan ===
In 2009 Søylen Eiendom opened the exclusive department store Eger Karl Johan. The magazine is located at Egertorget in Oslo. The company invested nearly one billion NOK in Eger Karl Johan, which consists of more than 7500 square meters of shops.

=== Steen & Strøm ===
In 2011 Søylen Eiendom and Schage Eiendom bought Norway’s oldest department store Steen & Strøm Magasin for more than 1 billion NOK. The goal is to revitalize and upgrade the historic department store.

=== Other properties ===
Søylen Eiendom is the owner of several properties in Oslo, Tønsberg and Moss in Norway as well as in Rostock, Germany and Zurich, Switzerland. Søylen’s largest concentration of properties is in downtown Oslo, and the company is currently the largest private owner of property in Oslo’s old city centre, Kvadraturen. In addition to its own properties Søylen manages a number of properties owned by the company’s major shareholders. The total portfolio is approximately 230,000 square meter.
