= Michael Treschow (judge) =

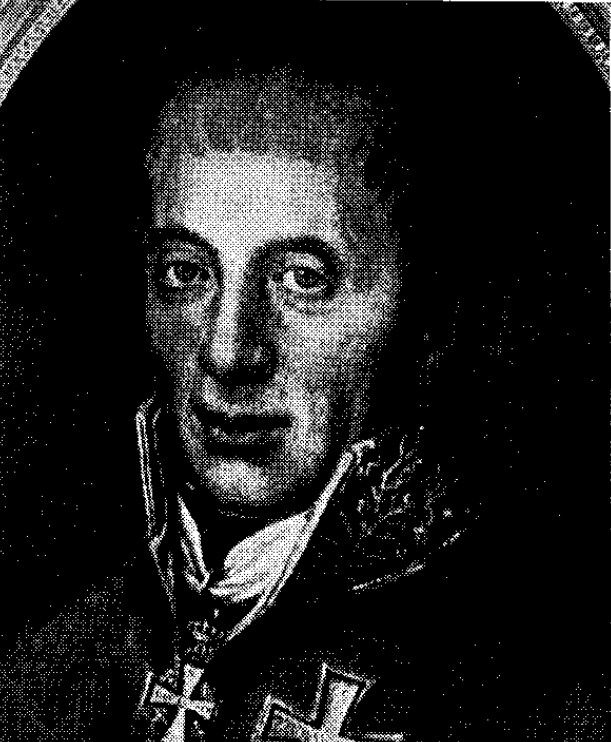
Michael Treschow.

Michael Treschow (5 March 1741 – 5 June 1816) was a Danish Supreme Court justice and prefect of Roskilde County who was ennobled by letters patent in 1812. He was the father of Herman Gerhardt Treschow and Frederik Treschow.

== Early life and education ==
Michael Treschow was born in Våge in the Gudbrand Valley, Norway, which was then part of the Danish-Norwegian double monarchy. He was sent to Copenhagen where he enrolled at University of Copenhagen in 1755 where he initially studied theology but later turned to Latin and law. He graduated in 1764.

== Career ==
Treschow became secretary for the Danish Chancellery (Danish: Danske Kancelli) and later as secretary for several other prominent government offices as well. In 1771 he was appointed to Supreme Court justice. In 1800 he resigned to assume a position as amtmand of Roskilde County. In 1808, he resigned due to poor health. In 1811, he was part of a commission to improve health policy.

== Other pursuits ==
In 1771, he became a member of the Royal Society for National History (Det kongelige danske Selskab for Fædrelandets Historie) and served as its president in 1798. He wrote a considerable number of articles for its publication Nye danske Magasin.

In 1776–1778, he was one of the directors of the Royal Danish Theatre and in 1784 he was member of a commission charged with considering the theatre's organisation.

== Titles and awards ==
He was appointed to justitsråd in 1774, etatsråd in 1779 and konferensråd in 1784. In 1812, he was appointed to Commander of the Order of the Dannebrog and was later that same year ennobled by letter patent.

== Family ==
He married Christina Elisabeth Wasserfall (baptized 26 July 1753 – 31 March 1823) on 8 April 1778. She was the daughter of merchant Peter Wasserfall and the widow after Tyske Kancelli deputy Peter Henningsen. They had the following children:

- Anna Elisabeth Treschow (born 1779)
- Herman Gerhardt Treschow (17 July 1780)
- Marie Petronelle Treschow (18 October 1781)
- Sofie Christine Treschow (1784)
- Frederik Wilhelm Treschow (15 September 1786)
- Michael Heinrich Johan Daniel Treschow (13 October 1891)
- Carl Treschow (born 1793)
- Johan Conrad Treschow (born 1798)

Civic offices
Preceded by Johan Henrik Knuth	County Governor of Roskilde County; 1800–1808	Succeeded by None
