= Frederik Wilhelm Treschow =

Danish lawyer (1786–1869)

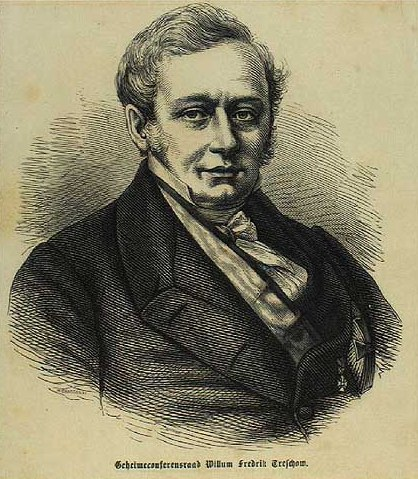
- Born: 15 September 1786; Copenhagen, Denmark
- Died: 2 April 1869 (aged 82); Copenhagen, Denmark
- Occupations: Lawyer, politician, landowner
- Known for: Treschows Stiftelse
- Awards: Grand Cross of the Dannebrog

Frederik Wilhelm Treschow (15 September 1786 – 2 April 1869). also known as Willum Frederik Treschow (his name at birth), or simply as Frederik Treschow, was a Danish supreme court attorney, politician, landowner and philanthropist. He founded Treschows Stiftelse in Copenhagen. He was the younger brother of Herman Gerhardt Treschow.

== Early life and education ==
Frederik Treschow was born in Copenhagen to Supreme Court justice Michael Treschow (1741–1816) and Christina E. Wasserfall (1753–1823). He graduated from Roskilde Cathedral School in Roskilde in 1803 after initially attending the Metropolitan School in Copenhagen. He studied law at the University of Copenhagen under the guidance of Anders Sandøe Ørsted and graduated in 1806.

== Career ==
In 1809, he started working for the Den kongelige Landsoverret samt Hof- og Stadsret. In 1911, and became a supreme court attorney . Treschow was considered one of the best barristers of his generation. He had many clients in the business world and represented the Danish Asiatic Company in a number of cases about the Danish West Indies.

In 1820–1821, he defended Jacob Jacobsen Dampe and in 1825–1826 he represented Grundtvigs against H. N. Clausen in a case about defamation and paid his fine of 100 Danish rigsdaler.

In 1828, he was appointed procurator fiscal. He prosecuted C. N. Davids in 1836 and Orla Lehmann in 1842 before resigning in 1846 when the government, against his advice, insisted on continuing the trial against the speakers at the Student Meeting of 1845 (Orla Lehmann, H. F. Poulsen and Frederik Helweg) who were all found not guilty.

From 1828 to 1833 and again from 1840 to 1845, 1849–1854 and 1858–1863, he represented the Bank of Denmark (from 1832 as chairman) and became a member of the commission in the so-called Twelve Million Case in 1838.

== Landowner ==
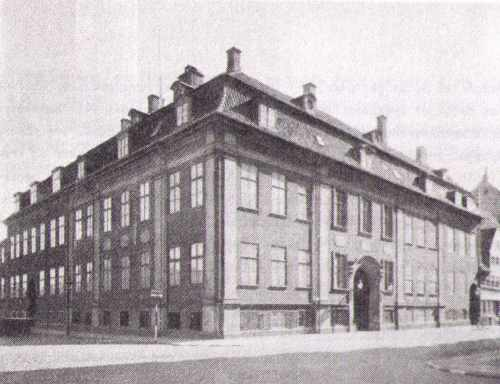
The Treschow Mansion seen on a drawing by Danish-English illustrator Nelly Erichsen

In 1828, he acquired Brahesborg on the island of Funen. In 1835, he also acquired the former countship of Laurvig in Norway with Fritzøe Ironworks. He modernized the management of the estate and founded the Vilhelmsborg estate in 1846–1847. He was also the owner of the Barchmann Mansion in Copenhagen from 1837.

In 1854, he ceded the two estates to his two sons. His adopted step-son Frederik Wilhelm Treschow received Brahesborg while his son Michael Treschow received Frizøe, where he already acted as manager.

== Politician ==
Treschow participated in the work leading to the adoption of the Constitution of Denmark as a representative appointed by the king. He was a member of Landstinget from 1849 until 1863.

== Philanthropy ==
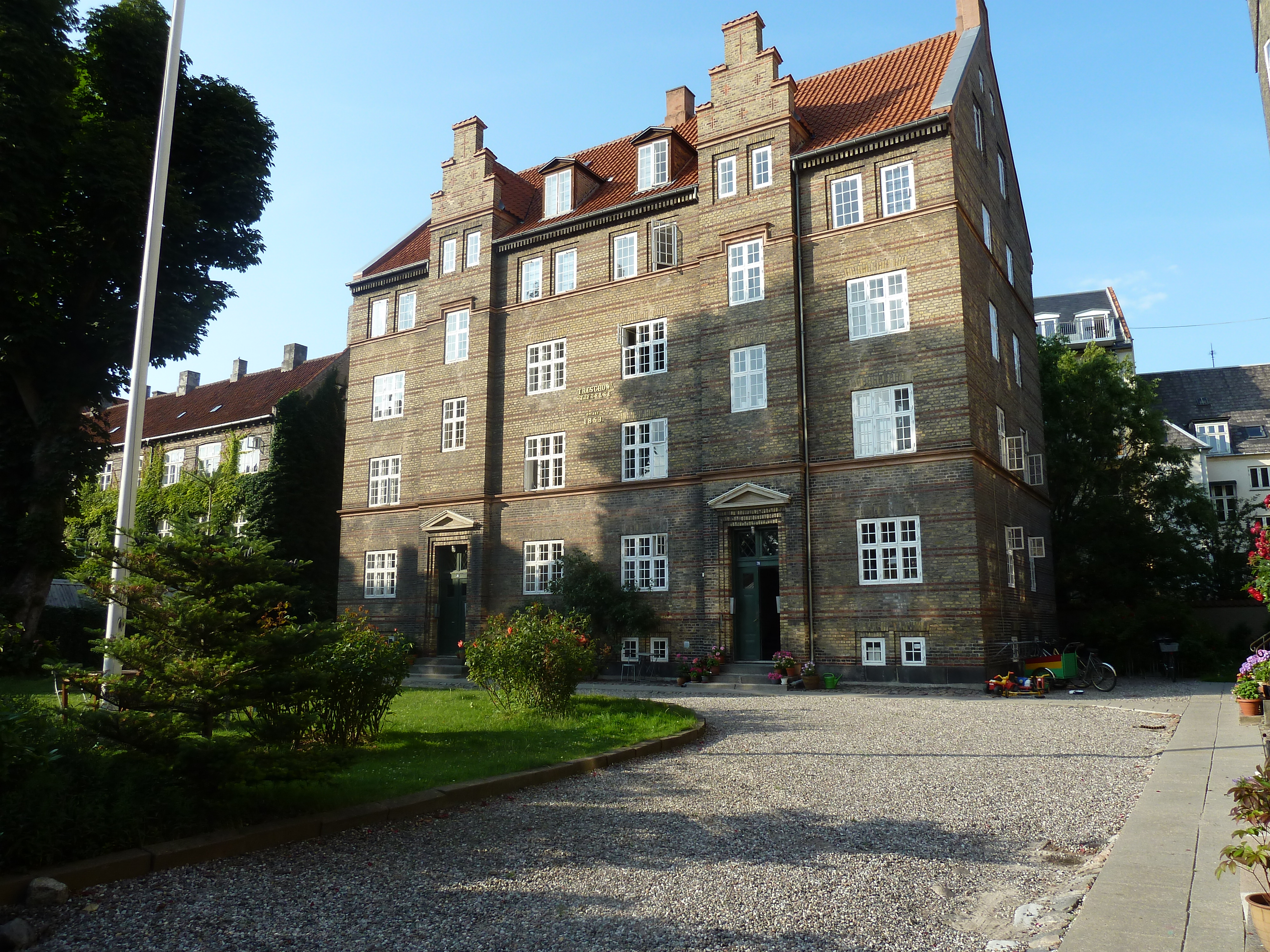
Treschows Stiftelse

Treschow was the administrator of numerous trusts, including Admiral Winterfeldts Stiftelse "Trøstens Bolig" which provided affordable housing for needy women. This may have inspired him to build similar facilities at his own expense. The first was built in the courtyard behind the Admiral building in 1847. The next was built in Christianshavn and consisted of two buildings completed in 1853 and 1857 to designs by Christian Tybjerg. In 1859, Treschow founded Det Treschow'ske Fideikommis (The Treschow Foundation).

== Honorary titles and awards ==
He was appointed justitsråd in 1824, etatsråd in 1829, konferensråd in 1846 and gehejmekonferensråd in 1854.

He became a Knight of the Order of the Dannebrog in 1838 and received the Cross of Honour of the Order of the Dannebrog in 1840. He became a Commander of the Order of the Dannebrog in 1848 and was awarded the Grand Cross of the Dannebrog in 1850.
