= Jens Boyesen =

Norwegian diplomat and politician (1920–1996)

Jens Mogens Boyesen (9 October 1920 – 20 November 1996) was a Norwegian diplomat and politician for the Labour Party.

== Personal life ==
He was born in Kristiania as a son of deputy under-secretary of state Einar Theiste Boyesen (1888–1972) and Borghild Koppang (1888–1978). He had a younger brother Einar who was killed during the Second World War. Fleeing occupied Norway after his involvement in Milorg was discovered, Einar Boyesen enrolled in the Norwegian Independent Company 1 and was killed during a mission in Norway in March–April 1945.

From 1944 to 1947 Jens Boyesen was married to Alix Dorry Sophie Theslöf. She later married Erling Steen. In 1955 he married journalist Erle Sigrun Bryn, a daughter of Norwegian Maritime Director Erling Bryn.

== Career ==
At the time Norway was invaded by Germany in 1940, Boyesen was a law student and member of the Labour Party. He had also a member of the socialist organization Mot Dag. The Labour cabinet Nygaardsvold fled to London in order to avoid an early capitulation. Germany occupied Norway for five years, whereas Boyesen became a part of the resistance movement. He was a messenger for both the Norwegian government-in-exile and the Norwegian legation in Stockholm, communicating on behalf of the so-called Kretsen, an inner circle of the resistance movement for which he was the secretary. Within Kretsen, he cooperated especially close with former Supreme Court Justice Ferdinand Schjelderup. Approaching the winter of 1944, Boyesen was no longer safe in Norway, and fled to Sweden. He worked as a secretary for the Norwegian legation in Stockholm until the liberation of Norway in 1945.

After the war Boyesen finished his law studies, graduating as cand.jur. in 1947. He worked as a deputy judge from 1948, and then as an advisor in the Ministry of Foreign Affairs from 1949. He then spent many years as a State Secretary in Torp's Cabinet, first in the Ministry of Foreign Affairs from 1951 to 1954 and in the Ministry of Defence from 1954 to 1955. He later returned as State Secretary in the Ministry of Foreign Affairs from 1963 to 1965, during Gerhardsen's Fourth Cabinet.

From 1955 to 1963 he had been Norway's Permanent Representative to NATO. When appointed, he was the youngest ambassador of Norway. In 1964 he was mentioned by Norwegian media as a candidate to take over as Secretary General of NATO after Dirk Stikker. Among the mentioned candidates was Manlio Brosio, who actually got the position. Boyesen was instead sent to Geneva to serve as ambassador to the international organizations seated in that city, including the European Free Trade Association. He served from 1968 to 1973.

When the first cabinet Bratteli assumed office in 1971, Boyesen was tipped by newspapers to take over as Minister of Foreign Affairs. This did not happen. He instead served in Brussels as Norwegian ambassador to the European Economic Community and Belgium from 1973 to 1976, and in Paris as ambassador to the OECD from 1977 to 1986.
