= Treschow family =

Danish noble family

Treschow
- Patrician
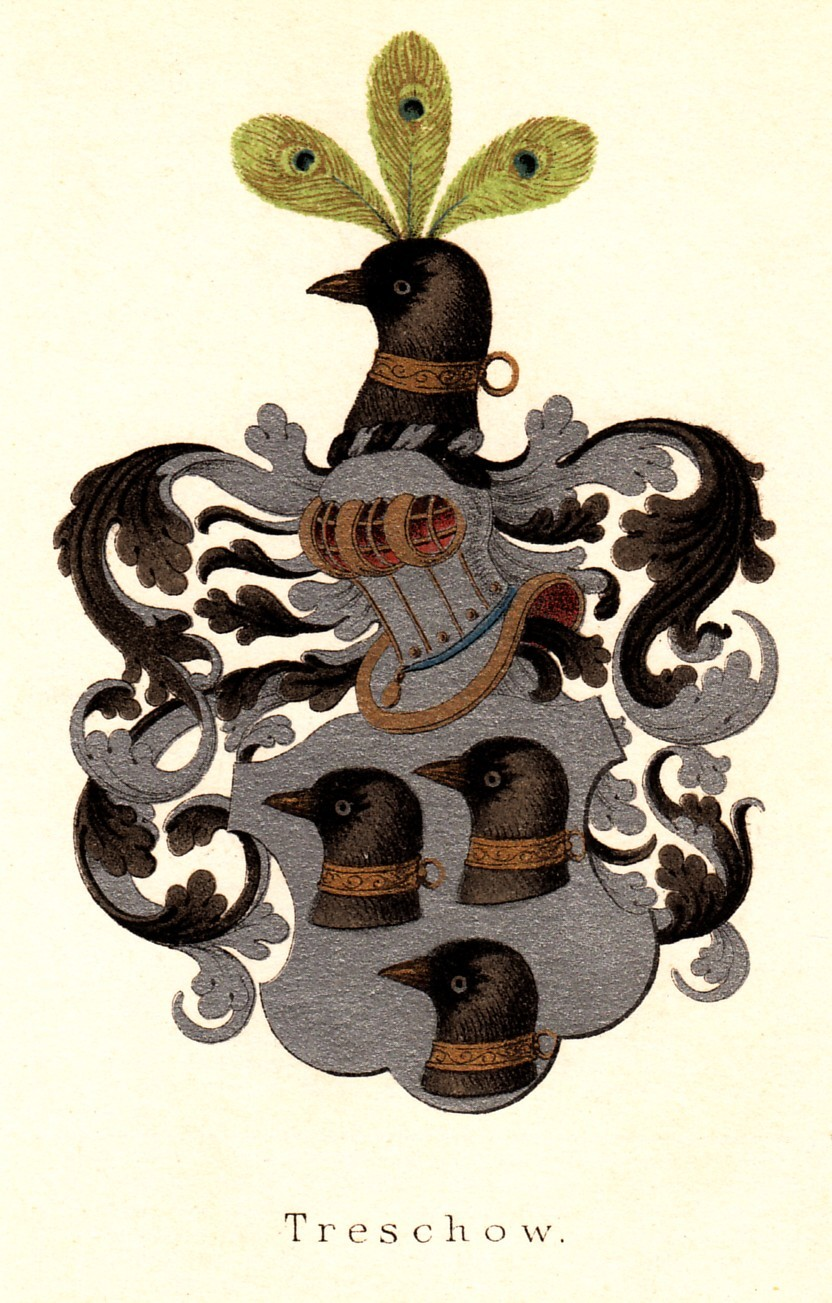
- The coat of arms of the Treschow family
- Country: Denmark; Norway; Sweden
- Place of origin: Næstved
- Founded: 1812 (noble status)
- Founder: Niels Hansen
- Estate(s): Brahesborg; Torbenfeldt; Fritzøehus

The Treschow family is a noble family originating in Denmark and with branches in Norway and Sweden. The family name means "wooden shoe-maker" and the family later counted many merchants in the 17th century and priests in the 18th century. A member of the family, Michael Treschow, bought the status of untitled (lower) nobility in Denmark in 1812. One of his sons settled in Norway, where the concept of nobility only was abolished a few years later. Members of this family have been industrialists and landowners, notably in Vestfold.

== General history ==
=== Origin ===
The family may be followed back to Niels Hansen (died 1593), who lived in Næstved, Denmark. His son was Rasmus Nielsen Træskomager (died 1633). He and many of his descendants were merchants. His son Giort Rasmussen Treschow (c. 1623–1665) was a shipowner and a merchant. The family came to Norway with Giort Treschow's sons Gerhard Treschow (c. 1659–1719), an industrialist who ran a shipping company, a sawmill and a papermill in Oslo, and Herman Treschow (1665–1723), who was his brother's general manager in Trondheim. Herman Treschow was the grandfather of Michael Treschow (1741–1816), who was a Supreme Court justice and county governor of Roskilde.

=== 1812 ennoblement ===
Michael Treschow, son of parish priest Herman Treschow in Søllerød, Denmark, was in 1812 ennobled by letters patent, thus becoming part of the untitled nobility. By the provisions of the patent, the patrilineal descendants of Michael Treschow, including unmarried females, were considered noble. Michael Treschow was the father of, amongst others, Herman Gerhardt Treschow and Frederik Wilhelm Treschow. Frederik Wilhelm Treschow, a lawyer and politician, who had bought Brahesborg on Funen and Fritzøe in Norway, divided the estates between his two sons, leaving the Danish estate to the elder son, Frederik Wilhelm Rosenkilde Treschow, and the Norwegian one to the younger son, Michael Treschow (1814–1901), thus creating a Danish and a Norwegian family line.

As for the Norwegian family members, persons born after the 1821 Nobility Law were not considered as noble in Norway. The family's most prominent recent member, Mille-Marie Treschow, would have forfeited her noble status by marrying a commoner if official nobility still had existed. Also her children bear the surname Treschow, but would not have been considered as noble according to the letters patent, as noble status is inherited only patrilineally. The agnatic descendants of Michael Treschow are nevertheless included in the Yearbook of the Danish Nobility (Danmarks Adels Aarbog) which is published by a private organisation.

=== Brahesborg line ===
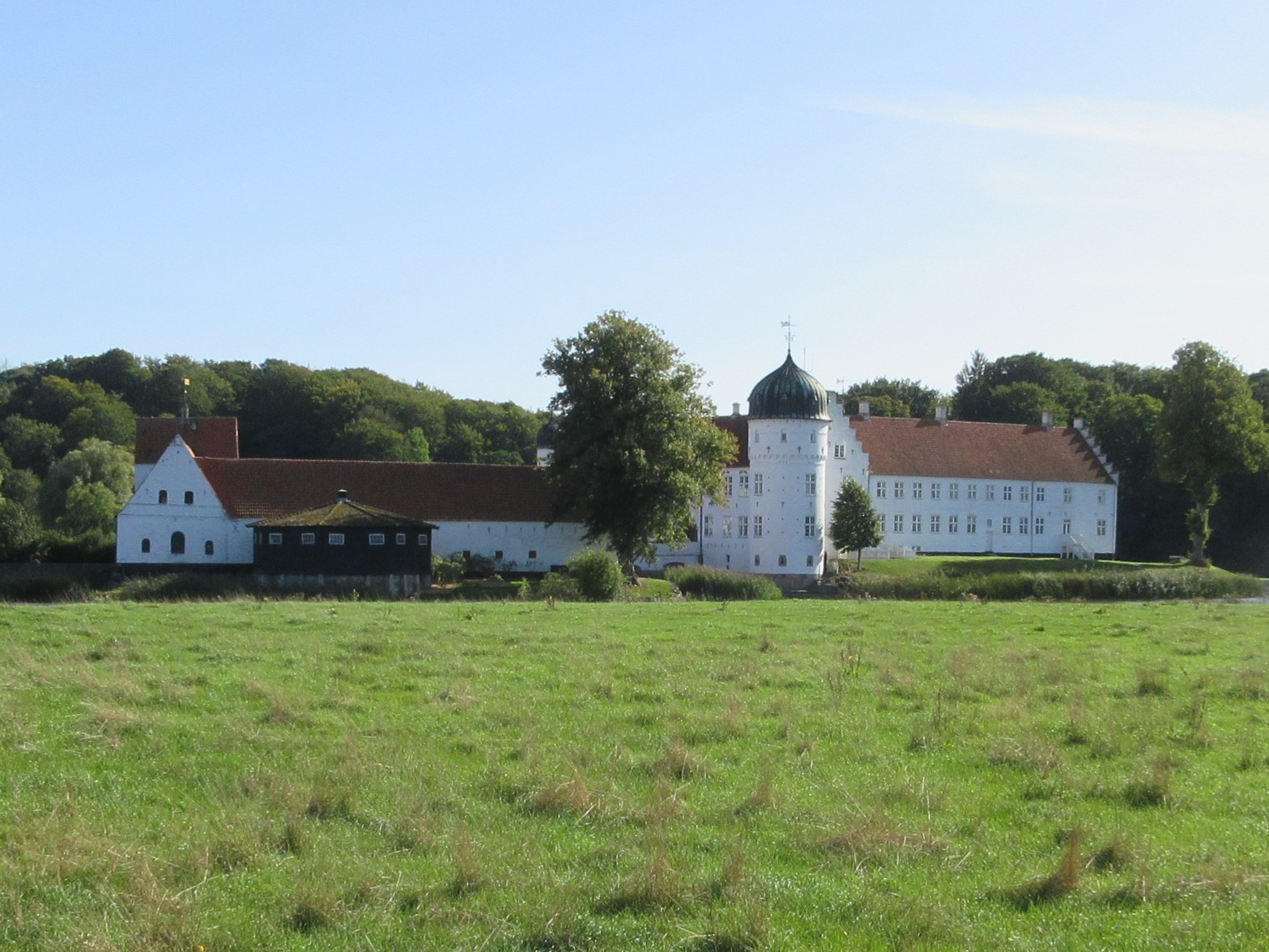
Torbenfeldt in 2020.

Frederik Wilhelm Rosenkilde Treschow til Brahesborg was married to Andrea Bjørn Rothe, a daughter of counter admiral Carl Adolph Rothe and Benedicte Ulfsparre de Tuxen. Brahesborg was passed to their eldest son Frederik Wilhelm Rosenkilde Treschow (1811-1869). The younger son Christian Rosenkilde Treschow (1842 - 1905) purchased Frydendal /renamed Torbenfeldt) in 1872.

=== Fritzøe line ===
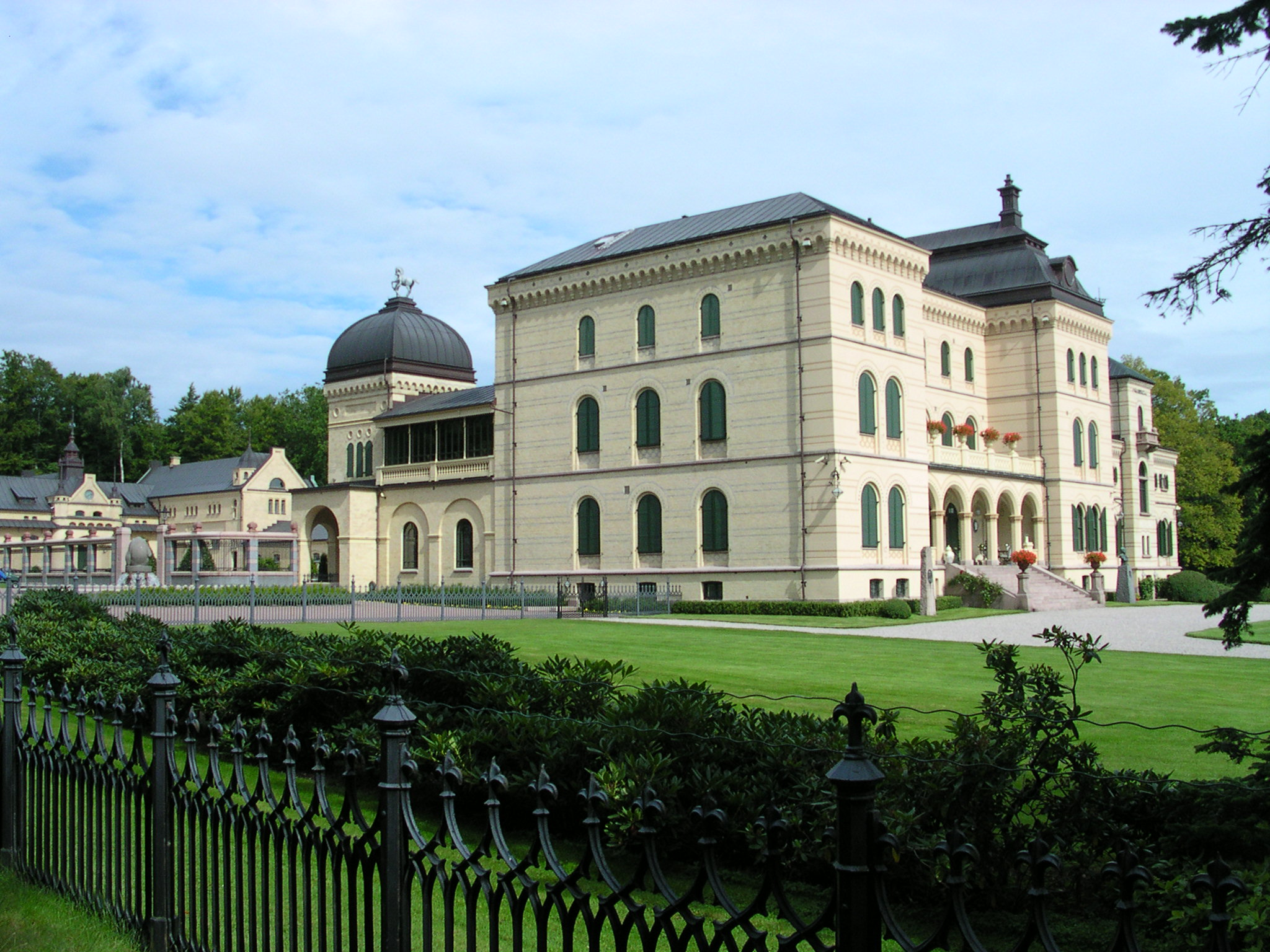
Fritzøehus, built for Michael Treschow and completed in 1898.

Michael Treschow (1814–1901) til Fritzøewas the father of Norwegian chamberlain (kammerherre) and lord chamberlain ( hofchef) Frederik "Fritz" Wilhelm Treschow til Fritzøe (1841–1903) as well as Swedish chamberlain Peter Oluf Brøndsted Treschow (1843–1881) and Michael Aagaard Treschow (1848–1919) who owned the Swedish estate Sannarps herrgård in the parish of Årstads in Falkenberg Municipality.

The latter founded a Swedish branch of the family and was the father of the Danish envoie Peter Oluf Treschow (1890–1970) and Niels Treschow of Hjuleberg and Sannarp (1881–1953). Niels Treschow was the father of Gert Treschow (born 1913), a major in the Royal Swedish Army, who was the father of Marianne Treschow (born 1941) and Niels Michael Aage Treschow (born 1943). Peter Oluf Brøndsted Treschow was the father of Fritz Michael Treschow of Fritzøe (1879–1971), father of Gerhard Aage Treschow of Fritzøe (1923–2001), who was the father of Mille-Marie Treschow (1954-2018).

== Coats of arms ==
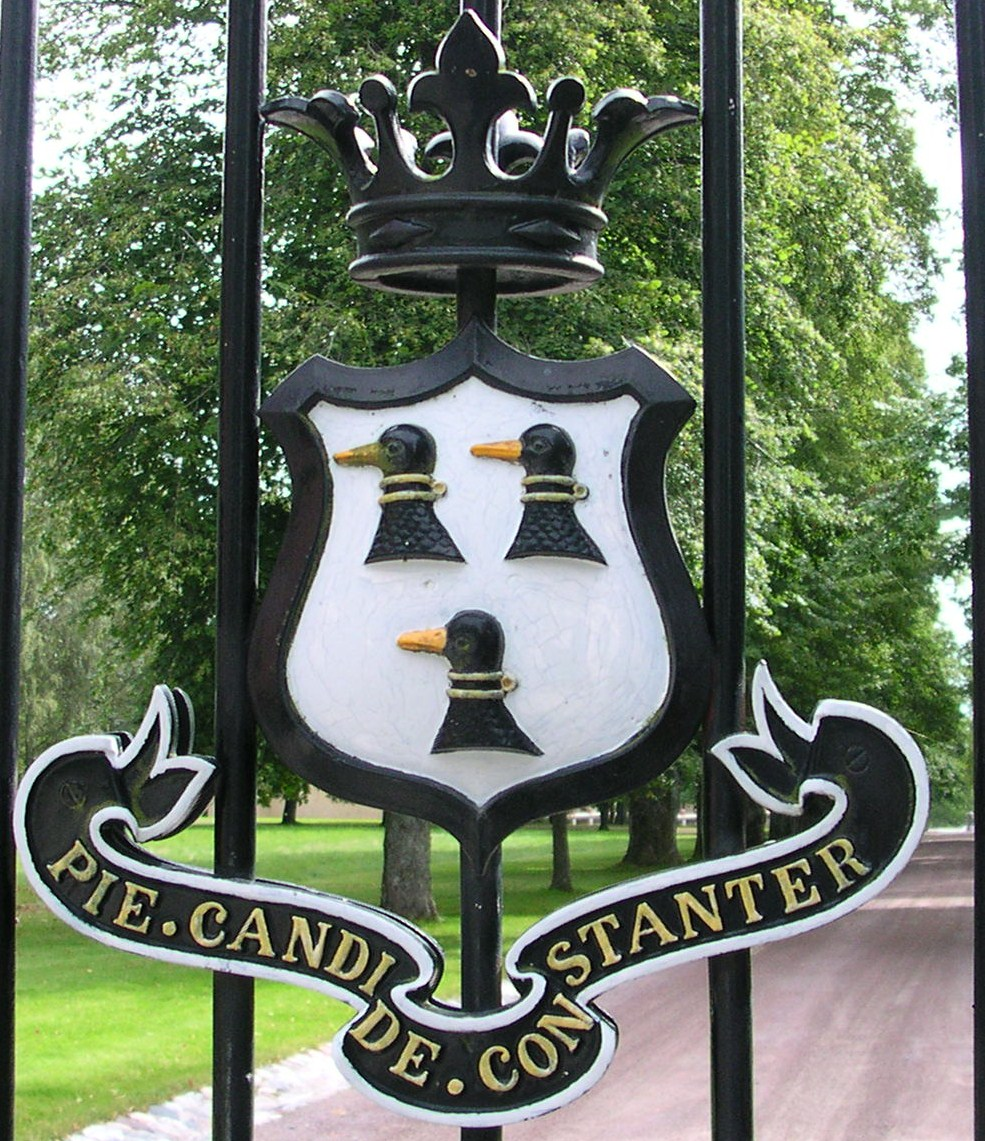
The coat of arms adopted by Michael Treschow's family in the 19th century, and based on the coat of arms of the unrelated noble German Tresckow family. Here seen on the portal to Fritzøehus.

Family members previously used various arms, including one with a clog, referring to the occupation of their ancestor (Nissen and Aaase, p. 143).

In the 19th century, Michael Treschow for himself and his descendants adopted a coat of arms which is nearly identical to that of the German Uradel family of Tresckow. The Norwegian Træskomager/Treschow family is unrelated to the noble German family, and the name has a completely different etymology. Some other Norwegian families are known to have adopted coats of arms (or variations thereof) of unrelated families with similar names.

Description: On silver background three (two over one) black jackdaw heads with a golden collar each. On the helm a noble coronet. Above the coronet a black jackdaw head with a golden collar, and on the top three peacock feathers.

The new coat of arms includes the motto Pie Candide Constanter.

== Notable members ==
- Frederik Treschow (1786–1869), supreme court attorney, politician, landowner and philanthropist
- Marie Treschow (1913–1952), Norwegian philanthropist
- Michael Treschow (1741–1816), progenitor
- Michael Treschow (born 1943), Swedish businessman
- Mille-Marie Treschow (1954-2018), owner of the Norwegian consortium Treschow-Fritzøe
- Frederik Conrad Bugge Treschow (31 December 1822 - 22 August 1893), publisher
- Steven James Treschow (born May 10, 1973), United States Geologist

== Other Sources ==
- Dansk biografisk lexikon: Treschow
- Dansk biografisk lexikon: Gerhard Treschow
- Dansk biografisk lexikon: Michael Treschow
