= Listed buildings in Assens Municipality =

This is a list of listed buildings in Assens Municipality, Denmark.

Note: This list is incomplete. A complete list og listed buildings in Vordingborg Municipality can be found on Danish Wikipedia.

== The list ==
=== 5560 Aarup ===
Listing name	Image	Location	Coordinates	Description
Billeskov		Billeskovvej 9, 5560 Aarup		
Erholm		Erholmvej 25, 5560 Aarup		
Erholm		Erholmvej 25, 5560 Aarup		
Kerte Præstegård		Kertevej 56, 5560 Aarup		
Kerte Præstegård		Kertevej 56, 5560 Aarup		
Kerte Præstegård		Kertevej 56, 5560 Aarup		
Skydebjerg Præstegård		Kærlighedsstien 1, 5560 Aarup		

=== 5610 Assens ===
Listing name	Image	Location	Coordinates	Description
Apoteket		Østergade 27, 5610 Assens		
Apoteket		Østergade 27, 5610 Assens		
Assens station		Søndre Ringvej 4, 5610 Assens	55°16′9.19″N 9°53′29.39″E	Railway station from 1884 by N.P. Holsøe
Assens Custom House		Nordre Havnevej 19, 5610 Assens	55°16′13.93″N 9°53′25.58″E	Custom house from 1834 by Jørgen Hansen Koch as well as the side wing and building on Strandgade from 1845
Brahesborg		Jørgen Brahes Vej 1, 5610 Assens		
Bregneholm		Mosegårdsvej 9, 5683 Haarby		
Bregneholm		Mosegårdsvej 9, 5683 Haarby		
Bregneholm		Mosegårdsvej 9, 5683 Haarby		
Bregneholm		Mosegårdsvej 9, 5683 Haarby		
Bryde House		Østergade 42, 5610 Assens		
Bågø Lighthouse		Sandhammeren 8, 5610 Assens		

=== 5620 Glamsbjerg ===
Listing name	Image	Location	Coordinates	Description
Damgård		Klaregade 22, 5620 Glamsbjerg		
Damgård		Klaregade 22, 5620 Glamsbjerg		
Damgård		Klaregade 22, 5620 Glamsbjerg		
Damgård		Klaregade 22, 5620 Glamsbjerg		
Damgård		Klaregade 22, 5620 Glamsbjerg		
Flemløse Kirkelade		Langgade 29, 5620 Glamsbjerg		
Fåborgvej 108		Fåborgvej 108, 5620 Glamsbjerg		
Fåborgvej 108		Fåborgvej 108, 5620 Glamsbjerg		
Fåborgvej 108		Fåborgvej 108, 5620 Glamsbjerg		
Hårbyvej 2		Hårbyvej 2, 5620 Glamsbjerg		
Hårbyvej 2		Hårbyvej 2, 5620 Glamsbjerg		
Hårbyvej 2		Hårbyvej 2, 5620 Glamsbjerg		
Hårbyvej 2		Hårbyvej 2, 5620 Glamsbjerg		
Krengerup		Krengerupvej 96, 5620 Glamsbjerg		
Krengerup		Krengerupvej 96, 5620 Glamsbjerg		
Krengerup		Krengerupvej 96, 5620 Glamsbjerg		
Krengerup		Krengerupvej 96, 5620 Glamsbjerg		
Risagergård		Klaregade 25, 5620 Glamsbjerg		
Tjenergården		Byvejen 11, 5620 Glamsbjerg		
Tjenergården		Byvejen 11, 5620 Glamsbjerg		
Tjenergården		Byvejen 11, 5620 Glamsbjerg		
Tjenergården		Byvejen 11, 5620 Glamsbjerg		
Tjenergården		Byvejen 11, 5620 Glamsbjerg		
Venekærgård		Voldtoftevej 8, 5620 Glamsbjerg		
Venekærgård		Voldtoftevej 8, 5620 Glamsbjerg		
Venekærgård		Voldtoftevej 8, 5620 Glamsbjerg		
Venekærgård		Voldtoftevej 8, 5620 Glamsbjerg		
Vestfynsk Hjemstavnsgård, Landmålergården		Klaregade 23, 5620 Glamsbjerg		
Vestfynsk Hjemstavnsgård, Landmålergården		Klaregade 23, 5620 Glamsbjerg		
Vestfynsk Hjemstavnsgård, Landmålergården		Klaregade 23, 5620 Glamsbjerg		
Vestfynsk Hjemstavnsgård, Landmålergården		Klaregade 23, 5620 Glamsbjerg		
Vestfynsk Hjemstavnsgård, Landmålergården		Klaregade 23, 5620 Glamsbjerg		
Vestfynsk Hjemstavnsgård, Landmålergården		Klaregade 23, 5620 Glamsbjerg		
Vestfynsk Hjemstavnsgård, Landmålergården		Klaregade 23, 5620 Glamsbjerg		
Villumgård		Voldtoftevej 40, 5620 Glamsbjerg		
Villumgård		Voldtoftevej 40, 5620 Glamsbjerg		
Villumgård		Voldtoftevej 40, 5620 Glamsbjerg		
Villumgård		Voldtoftevej 40, 5620 Glamsbjerg		
Voldtoftevej 13		Voldtoftevej 13, 5620 Glamsbjerg		

=== 5631 Ebberup ===
Listing name	Image	Location	Coordinates	Description
Bogården		Helnæs Byvej 3, 5631 Ebberup		
Bogården		Helnæs Byvej 3, 5631 Ebberup		
Bogården		Helnæs Byvej 3, 5631 Ebberup		
Bogården		Helnæs Byvej 3, 5631 Ebberup		
Hagenskov, Frederiksgave		Slots Alle 1, 5631 Ebberup	55°13′39.13″N 9°59′15.86″E	Main building from 1744 to 1776 by Georg Erdman Rosenberg and the wall around the park
Hagenskov, Frederiksgave		Slots Alle 1, 5631 Ebberup	55°13′39.13″N 9°59′15.86″E	Former forge
Hagenskov Slotsmølle		Slots Alle 26, 5631 Ebberup		
Hagenskov Slotsmølle		Slots Alle 26, 5631 Ebberup		
Kobbelhuset		Ege Alle 5, 5631 Ebberup		

=== 5683 Haarby ===
Listing name	Image	Location	Coordinates	Description
Bregneholm		Mosegårdsvej 9, 5683 Haarby		
Bregneholm		Mosegårdsvej 9, 5683 Haarby		
Bregneholm		Mosegårdsvej 9, 5683 Haarby		
Brydegård		Brydegaardsvej 10, 5683 Haarby		
Brydegård		Brydegaardsvej 10, 5683 Haarby		
Brydegård		Brydegaardsvej 10, 5683 Haarby		
Brydegård		Brydegaardsvej 10, 5683 Haarby		
Damsbo		Strandbyvej 62A, 5683 Haarby		
Dreslettevej 5		Dreslettevej 5, 5683 Haarby		
Dreslettevej 5		Dreslettevej 5, 5683 Haarby		
Dreslettevej 5		Dreslettevej 5, 5683 Haarby		
Dreslettevej 5		Dreslettevej 5, 5683 Haarby		
Dreslettevej 5		Dreslettevej 5, 5683 Haarby		
Dreslettevej 5		Dreslettevej 5, 5683 Haarby		
Flenstofte		Helnæsvej 1, 5683 Haarby		
Jordløse Præstegård		Landevejen 24, 5683 Haarby		
Jordløse Præstegård		Landevejen 24, 5683 Haarby		
Løgismose		Alleen 5, 5683 Haarby		
Mosegård		Mosegårdsvej 3, 5683 Haarby		
Mosegård		Mosegårdsvej 3, 5683 Haarby		
Mosegård		Mosegårdsvej 3, 5683 Haarby		
Mosegård		Mosegårdsvej 3, 5683 Haarby		
Mosegård		Mosegårdsvej 3, 5683 Haarby		
Skårup		Skårupvej 1, 5683 Haarby		
Skårup		Skårupvej 1, 5683 Haarby		
Skårup		Skårupvej 1, 5683 Haarby		
Skårup	Solhøj (Aldershvile)		Nørrelundsvej 2, 5683 Haarby	
Skårup	Solhøj (Aldershvile)		Nørrelundsvej 2, 5683 Haarby	
	Solhøj (Aldershvile)	Nørrelundsvej 2, 5683 Haarby		
Søbo		Søbovej 12, 5683 Haarby		
Vandværksvej 1		Vandværksvej 1, 5683 Haarby		
Vandværksvej 1		Vandværksvej 1, 5683 Haarby		
