= Frederik Conrad Bugge Treschow =

Danish publisher

Frederik Conrad Bugge Treschow (31 December 1822 – 22 August 1893) was a Danish publisher.

== Early life and education ==
Treshow was born in Copenhagen, the son of clerk in chatolkassen Andreas Treshow (1794–1846) and Anna Maria Wendel (l) (1797–1864).

Treshow was in 1854 employed at Holmen, first as a copyist and from 1861 as a clerk. He was appointed as overkrigskommissær in 1869. In 1891 he was appointed as head of the Royal Dockyard's accounting department, a position otherwise reserved for a naval officer. His brother-in-law, justitsråd Erichsen, who was editor of hof- og statskalenderen, introduced him to statistical publications. He published Postadressebog for Kongeriget Danmark in 1869. New editions were published in 1877, 1883 and 1890.

== Honors ==
He was appointed as Overkrigskommissær in 1869 and was awarded the Order of the Dannebrog in 1877.
