= Christian Strøm Steen =

Norwegian businessman (1854–1932)

Christian Strøm Steen (21 May 1854 – 1932) was a Norwegian businessman.

== Biography ==
He was born on 21 May 1854, in Kristiania, to wholesaler Emil Steen (1829–1884) and Ovidia Laurenze Jebe (1829–1905). He was a brother of Johan Steen and Emil Steen. He was also an uncle of Erling and Fredrik Steen.

In 1884, he married Lilli Bing, daughter of a timber merchant in Fredrikstad. They had the sons Nils and Emil Steen.

He finished his secondary education in 1872. He took commercial education in England, Germany and France and worked as a timber merchant in Fredrikstad before becoming a co-owner of Steen & Strøm. The company was owned by his father and the Strøm family. When his father died in 1884, Christian Strøm Steen became partner together with Johan Steen and Christian Strøm Jr. The next generation of owners took over in the 1910s. He died in 1932.
