= Kjos =

Kjos or Kjøs is a Norwegian surname.

Notable people with the surname include:

- Alv Kjøs (1894–1990), Norwegian politician.
- Bjørn Kjos (born 1946), Norwegian aviator, lawyer, and businessman.
- Caroline Hagen Kjos (born 1984), Norwegian businesswoman.
- Kari Kjønaas Kjos (born 1962), Norwegian politician.
- Kjeld Kjos (1905–1983), Norwegian footballer.
- Neil A. Kjos, American founder of the Neil A. Kjos Music Company
