= Paul Christian Frank =

Norwegian barrister and politician

- Born: 28 November 1879; Kristiania, Norway (present-day Oslo, Norway)
- Died: 21 February 1956 (aged 76); Oslo, Norway
- Occupation(s): Barrister, politician, organizer, non-fiction writer

Paul Christian Frank (28 November 1879 – 21 February 1956) was a Norwegian barrister, politician, organizer and non-fiction writer.

He was born in Kristiania (present-day Oslo, Norway). He was CEO of the trade association Norges Handelsstands Forbund from 1920 to 1952. Frank is particularly remembered for his tireless agitation against governmental price controls. He was decorated Knight, First Class of the Order of St. Olav in 1946, Knight of the Order of the Dannebrog, Knight of the Order of the Polar Star and Commander of the Order of Vasa.

During the occupation of Norway by Nazi Germany, Frank was imprisoned in Møllergata 19 from June to July 1941, then in Grini concentration camp from 12 September 1941 to 26 November 1942. He was arrested a third time in June 1944; after a month in Åkebergveien he was incarcerated in Grini from July to August 1944. He had endeavored to keep Norges Handelsstands Forbund from being usurped by the Nazis. His organization was one of forty-three to protest Nazification attempts on 15 May 1941, in a letter addressed directly to Reichskommissar Josef Terboven. This protest of the 43 was met with harsh reactions; by 12 June 1941 an arrest order had been issued on Frank's fellow signatory from Norges Handelsstands Forbund, Erling Steen. On 18 June six more protesters were arrested, including Frank.

Frank died in Oslo on 21 February 1956.
