= SalMar =

Norwegian fish farm company

SalMar ASA
- Company type: Allmennaksjeselskap
- Traded as: OSE: SALM
- Industry: Fish farming
- Founded: 1991; 8 February 1991
- Headquarters: Frøya Municipality, Norway
- Area served: Norway
- Key people: Olav-Andreas Ervik (President & CEO), Trond Tuvstein (Chief Financial Officer), Gustav Witzøe (Director of Strategic Projects)
- Number of employees: 1,500
- Website: www.salmar.no

SalMar ASA is a Norwegian fish farm company and one of the world's largest producers of farmed salmon. The company's main activities include marine-phase farming, broodfish and smolt production, processing and sale of farmed salmon. It holds 100 licenses for production of Atlantic salmon in Norway, located in Trøndelag, Nordmøre and, through its subsidiary Senja Sjøfarm AS, Troms. It also owns 50% of Norskott Havbruk which operates fish farms as Scottish Sea Farms. The company is based in Frøya Municipality and is listed on the Oslo Stock Exchange since 2007. The company was founded in 1991, its main shareholder is today the founder's son Gustav Magnar Witzøe.

SalMar sells farmed salmon across Asia, the United States, Canada, Russia and Norway.

== Offshore fish farming ==
SalMar created an offshore fish farm pilot project called Ocean Farm 1. This farm has operated off the coast of the island of Frøya since 2017. It was towed back to a shipyard in 2022 for some improvements and repairs then returned to its original location. It uses a structure 69 meters tall & 110 meters in diameter with a volume of 250,000 cubic meters to produce around 6000 tonnes a year of salmon.

The company plans a Smart Fish Farm with a larger 22.7 tonne per year production capacity.
