= Stein Erik Hagen =

Norwegian businessman (1956–2026)

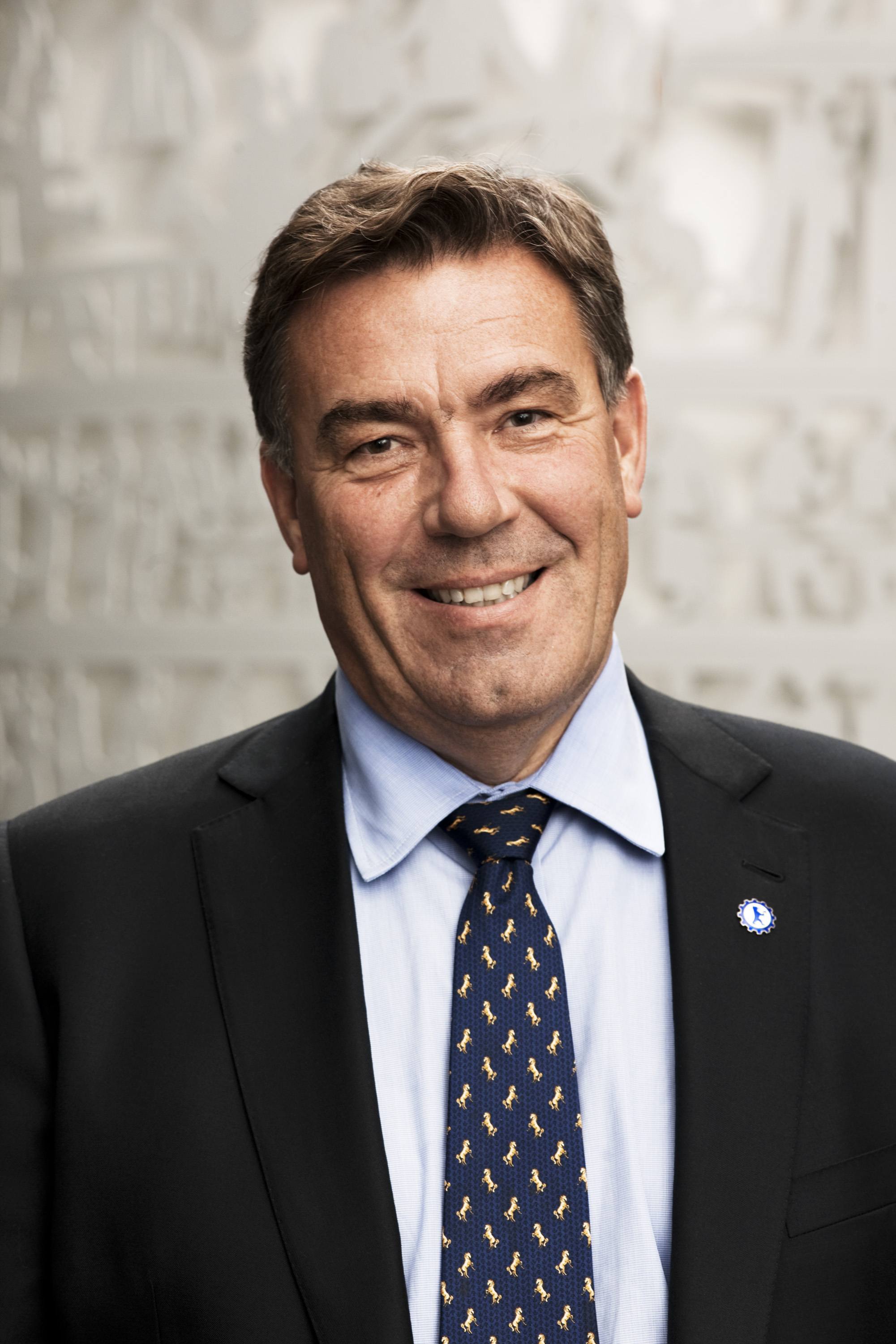
- Born: 22 July 1956
- Died: 4 May 2026 (aged 69)
- Education: BI Norwegian Business School
- Occupation: Businessman
- Title: Chairman, Orkla
- Spouse(s): Mille-Marie Treschow (m. 2004; div. 2012) Bendik Skinningsrud (m. 2025)
- Children: 4, including Caroline

Stein Erik Hagen (22 July 1956 – 4 May 2026) was a Norwegian businessman. He was chairman of Orkla, where he was a major shareholder, and held large stakes in Steen & Strøm, Jernia and Komplett through his family company Canica. As of May 2026, Forbes estimated his net worth at US$2.8 billion.

== Early life and career ==
Hagen was educated at Kjøpmannsinsituttet (now part of the BI Norwegian Business School). He founded the RIMI discount store chain along with his father in the 1970s, the Rimi Baltic chain in 1990s, and retained ownership of both until the 2000s, when he sold to Swedish ICA and Ahold. Most of the money was ploughed into Orkla. Hagen reportedly owned one of the biggest sailboats in Europe and used to own a private island in the Caribbean.

He provided financial support to the Liberal Party in the 2005 Norwegian election and to the Liberal Party, Christian Democratic Party, Conservative Party and Progress Party in 2006 and continued this until 2026.

== Personal life and death ==
Stein Erik Hagen had three children from his first marriage, and a son from a later relationship. In 2004, he married Mille-Marie Treschow, the couple announced in 2012 that they were separating.

In October 2015, Hagen came out as gay on the Norwegian-Swedish talk show Skavlan. Later the same day he added that he was bisexual and probably had been since his 30s, and that his ex-wives and family had known about his sexuality for many years.

Hagen married 30-year old Bendik Skinningsrud, a cardiac specialist, in November 2025.

He died from a heart attack on 4 May 2026, at the age of 69.
