= Gustav Magnar Witzøe =

Norwegian business owner

- Born: February 8, 1993 (age 32); Frøya Municipality, Norway
- Occupations: Investor; socialite; businessman
- Known for: Youngest billionaire and major shareholder of SalMar

Gustav Magnar Witzøe (born February 8, 1993, in Frøya Municipality) is a Norwegian billionaire and significant shareholder of salmon fish farming company SalMar ASA. He is one of the youngest billionaires in the world, his father having made him SalMar's main shareholder for inheritance tax purposes when he was 18.

== Early life ==
Witzøe was born in Frøya Municipality in Trøndelag county, to businessman Gustav and carer Oddny Witzøe. His father founded SalMar, which is one of the world's largest producers of farmed salmon. SalMar also owns a significant stake in Scottish Sea Farms, the UK's second-largest salmon farmer. Aged 18, his father made him SalMar's main shareholder, primarily for inheritance tax purposes.

== Career ==
Witzøe is involved with the family business and worked as a milker at SalMar's fish farms in Frøya. As of 2024, his net worth was $3.8 billion.

Witzøe is also a technology startup and property investor. He previously worked for MGM Property, and has invested in both Gopi and Keybutler.

== Legal issues ==
At the age of 19, Witzøe served a two-week prison sentence for reckless driving and overtaking at a speed of 116 km/h (72 mph) in a 60 km/h (37 mph) zone.
