= Erling Steen =

Norwegian businessman and resistance member

Erling Steen (6 March 1891 – 22 September 1961) was a Norwegian businessman, humanitarian leader and member of the Norwegian resistance movement in World War II.

== Personal life ==
Steen was born in Kristiania as a son of Johan Steen (1856–1934) and Marie Eveline Gulbranson (1861–1942). He was a grandson of Emil Steen (1829–1884), a nephew of Emil Jr. and Christian Steen, and a first cousin of Fredrik, Nils and Emil Steen. His sister Sigrid married Hans Thomas "Hassa" Horn.

In November 1916 Erling Steen married Helene C. Laurantzon, a wholesaler's daughter. The marriage ended in August 1940. In the same month he married Kathleen Ragnhild Collett, née Falsen and divorcee of Johan Collett. This marriage ended in June 1949. The same month Steen entered his third marriage, this time to Alix Dorry Sophie Boyesen, née Theslöf and divorcee of diplomat Jens Boyesen. He resided at Lagåsen in Bærum.

== Career ==
Steen finished his secondary education in 1910, graduated from Kristiania Commerce School in 1912 and underwent mercantile training in the United States, Germany and France. His education prepared him to enter as a partner in the family company Steen & Strøm, which he did in 1915. Together with Eyvind Strøm and Nils Steen, who entered the company too in the 1910s, he took it over in the 1930s. Erling Steen most notably served as chairman of the board from 1939 to 1961.

He was also an important figure in enterprise organizations, chairing Oslo Manufakturkjøbmenns Forening (1928–1931), Manufakturkjøbmennenes Landsforbund (1930–1933), Oslo Handelsstands Forening (1933–1936), Norges Handelsstands Forbund (1936–1946) and the Norwegian branch of the International Chamber of Commerce (1937–1948). He was also a deputy member of Oslo city council from 1931 to 1934.

During the occupation of Norway by Nazi Germany he endeavored to keep Norges Handelsstands Forbund from being usurped by the Nazis. His organization was one of forty-three to protest Nazification attempts in May 1941, in a letter addressed directly to Reichskommissar Josef Terboven. This protest of the 43 was met with harsh reactions; already on 12 June 1941 arrest orders were issued on Steen and fellow signatory Henning Bødtker. On 18 June six more protesters were arrested, including Steen's fellow signatory from Norges Handelsstands Forbund, Paul Christian Frank. Steen was imprisoned in Møllergata 19 (June to July 1941) and later in Grini concentration camp (September 1941 to February 1943). Until his release in late February 1943, he served as an informal "director of personnel" in Grini concentration camp, in other words a liaison, administrator and leading figure in general. Three months later, Steen was subject to a new crackdown, this time regarding Steen & Strøm where he was chairman. As the company refused to abide by the trade policies of the occupiers, Steen & Strøm's wholesaling and retailing departments were shut down by the authorities.

After the Second World War, Steen chaired the Norwegian Red Cross from 1947 to 1957 and the Aid to Europe/Norwegian Refugee Council from 1947 to 1958. He was also a member of the post-war press scrutiny committee from 1945 to 1946 and Statens økonomiske samordningsråd from 1935 to 1947. In business, he was a board member of Norges Varemesse from 1929 to 1932, Bergens Privatbank from 1936 to 1950, Vinmonopolet from 1945 to 1954, Bygg ditt Land from 1945 to 1950 Forsikringsselskapet Poseidon from and the Norwegian Geographical Society from 1945. He chaired the supervisory council of Forsikringsselskapet Ørnen. He served as consul for Denmark from 1946, and was promoted to consul-general in 1955. He was also an editorial committee member of Norsk biografisk leksikon. He died in September 1961 and was buried at Vestre gravlund.

== Orders and Decorations ==
- Commander of the Order of St. Olav (17–11–1956)
- Knight, First Class of the Order of St. Olav (08–12–1947)
- Badge of Honour of the Norwegian Red Cross
- Officer of the Order of the Crown of Belgium
- Gold Medal of the Belgian Red Cross (presented 25–05–1954)
- Order of the Dannebrog of Denmark
- Cross of Merit of the Finnish Red Cross
- Officer of the Legion of Honour of France
- Gold Medal of the French Red Cross
- Order of Merit of Germany
- Decoration 1st Class of the German Red Cross
- Commander of the Order of the British Empire of Great Britain
- Knight 1st class (Gold Cross) of the Order of George I of Greece
- Decoration 2st Class of the Hellenic Red Cross
- Grand Officer of the Order of Merit of the Republic of Italy (30–12–1952)
- Gold Medal of the Italian Red Cross
- Order of Merit of the Japanese Red Cross
- Commander of the Order of Orange-Nassau of the Netherlands (20–08–1954)
- Cross of Merit of the Netherlands Red Cross (22–04–1955)
- Knight, First Class of the Order of the Polar Star of Sweden
- Gold Medal of Merit of the Swedish Red Cross
