= Fritzøehus =

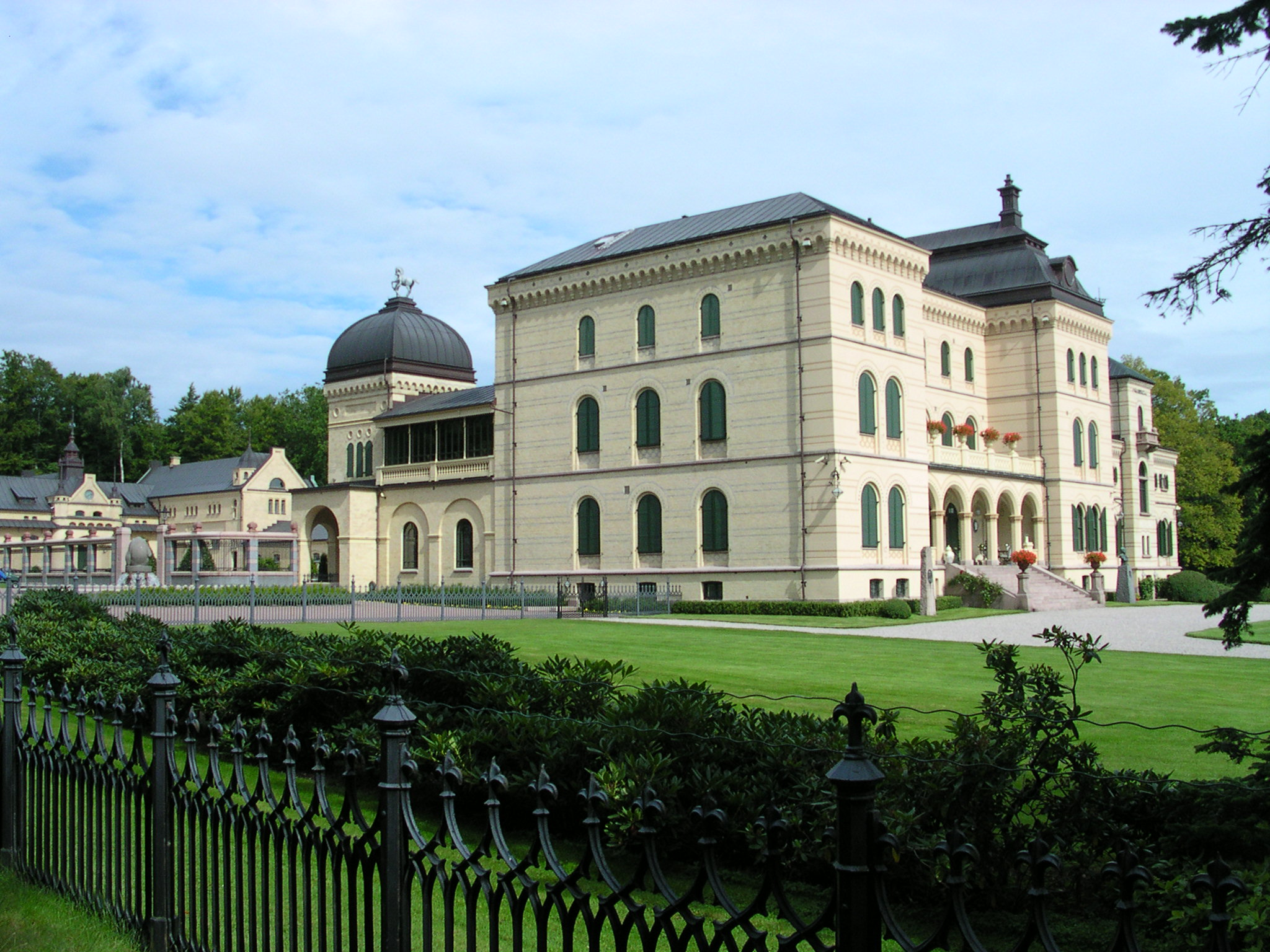

General information
- Location: Larvik, Norway
- Coordinates: 59°2′27.95″N 9°59′49.17″E
- Completed: 1865
- Owner: Mille-Marie Treschow

Design and construction
- Architect: Jacob Wilhelm Nordan

Fritzøehus is a private estate and palace located just outside the town of Larvik in Larvik Municipality in Vestfold county, Norway. It is the largest privately-owned estate in Norway.

== History ==
The estate has traditionally been associated with various members of the Treschow family. Fritzøehus was built for Michael Treschow (1814-1901) during the years 1863–1865. Michael Treschow was one of the country's most important industrialists in the mid-19th century. He owned Fritzøe Jernverk, an ironworks together with sawmills and sizable forest properties in Larvik.

Fritzøehus was designed in Renaissance Revival architecture by architect Jacob Wilhelm Nordan (1824–1892). The manor house was expanded in 1885–1889 and 1897–1898. The total floor area includes 75 rooms plus 21 basement rooms, making it the largest private residence in Norway.

== Fritzøehus Park ==
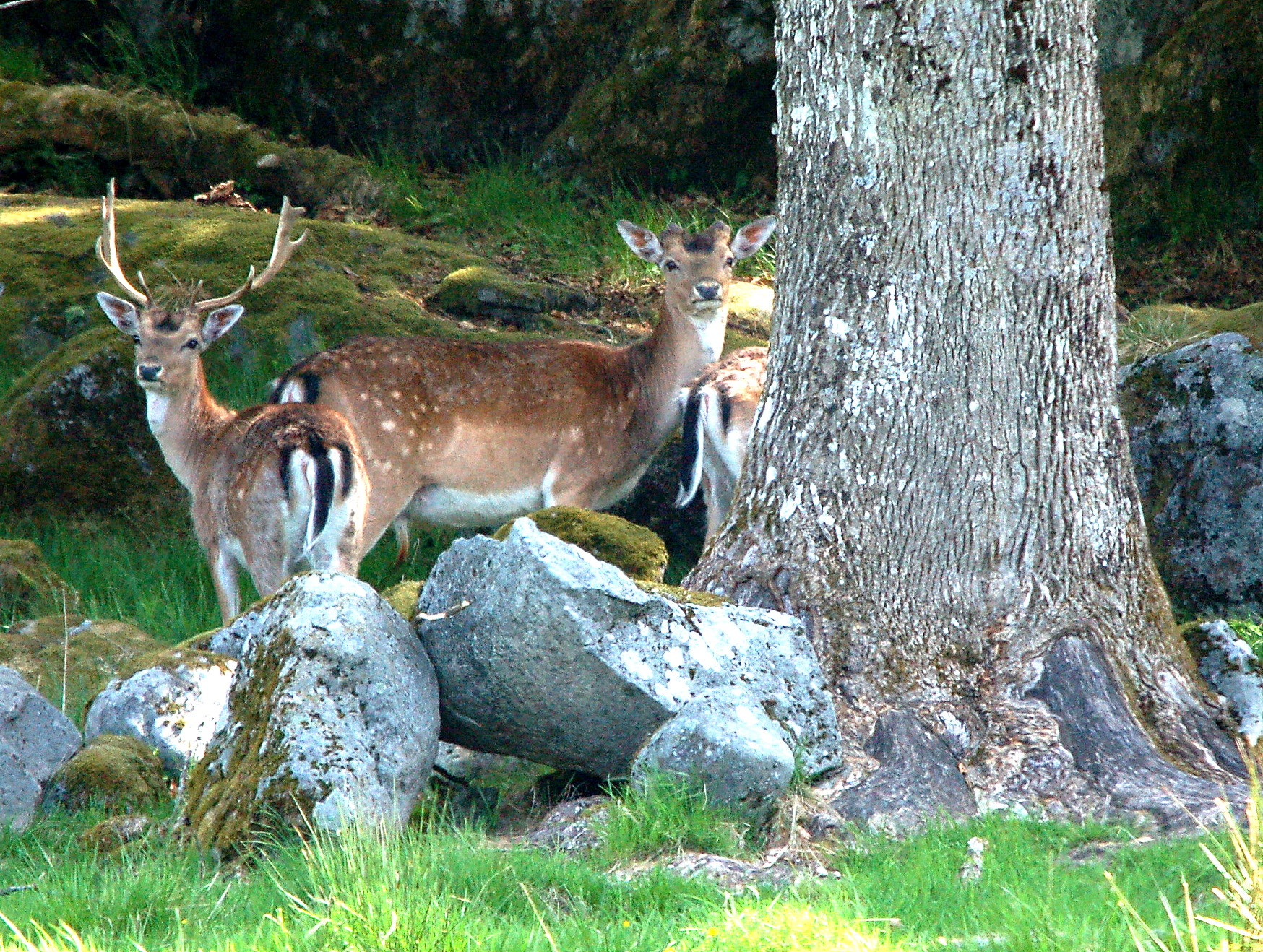
Fallow deer in Frizøehus Park in 2011.

Fritzøehus is located in Fritzøehus park, which today is a designated conservation area for the purpose of preserving the large beech forests and the distinctive landscape. In the 1,700-acre (6.9 km^{2}) park there are also walnut, fir, and spruce trees. The park was built in the English style in the 1860s. In the courtyard stands a water fountain and a sculpture of a bear by sculptor Anne Grimdalen (1899–1961). The park includes a collection of fallow deer and mouflon from the Mediterranean.

The owner of Fritzøehus was Mille-Marie Treschow until her death in 2018.
