= Herman Gerhard Treschow =

Danish government official

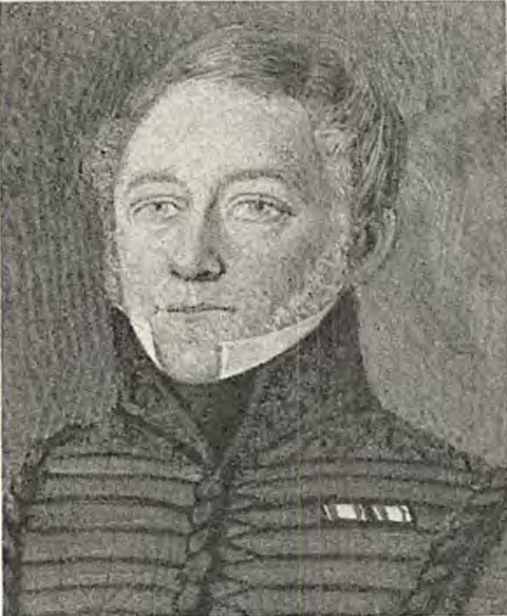
Herman Gerhardt Treschow (1780-1835).

Herman Gerhard Treschow (17 July 1780 – 12 February 1836) was a Danish government official who served as county governor of Nordre Bergenhus (1811–1814; then part of Denmark-Norway), Vejle (1815–1826) and Frederiksborg (1826–1836). He was the brother of Frederik Wilhelm Treschow.

== Early life and education ==
Treschow was born on 18 July 1780 in Copenhagen, the son of Supreme Court justice Michael Treschow and Christina Elisabeth Wasserfall. He completed his secondary schooling in 1787. He earned a law degree from the University of Copenhagen in 1800.

== Career ==
Treschow began his career as a secretary at the Supreme Court. In 1804, he became a judge at Hof- og Stadsretten. In 1811, he was sent to Norway as county governor of Nordre Bergenhus. He was fired from the post in conjunction with the dissolution of the personal union between Denmark and Norway. On 20 May 1815, he was instead employed as herredsfoged of Hads and Ning Herred. In 1820, he returned to Denmark after having been appointed as county governor of Vejle County in Jutland. On 1 November 1826, he became county governor of Frederiksborg County. He remained on this post until his death.

Treschow was considered a very capable administrator. He was frequently used by the government as a member of various commissions.

== Personal life ==
Treshow was married to royal actress Juliane Marie Funck (1786—1868) on 8 October 1813. She was the daughter of porcelain merchant Peter Funck and Sina Catharina Wøhlers.

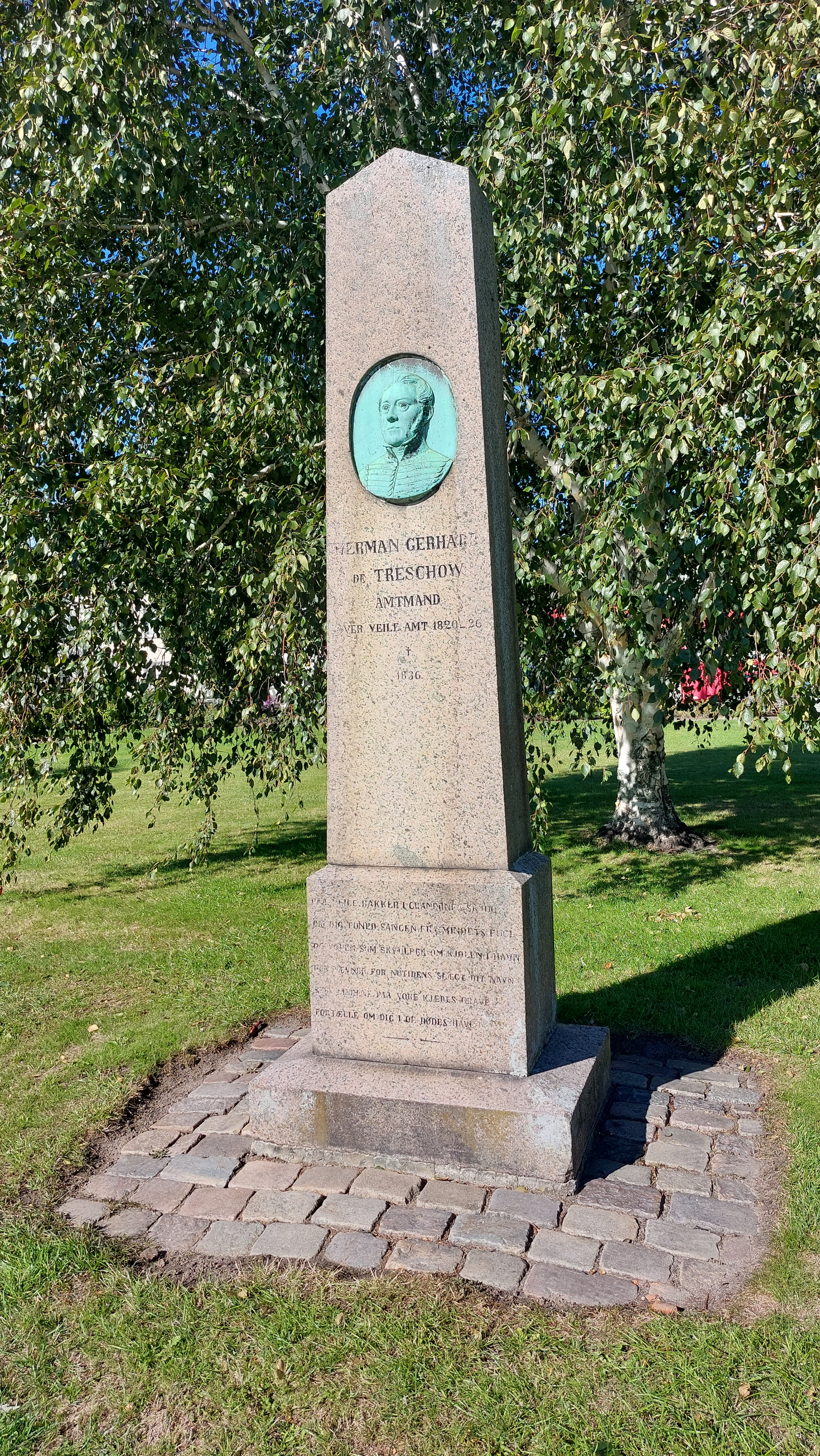
Memorial in Vejle

Civic offices
| Preceded by Hilmar Meincke Krohg | County Governor of Nordre Bergenhus County; 1811—1814 | Succeeded by Christian Magnus Falsen |
| Preceded by Johan Henrik Selmer | County Governor of Vejle County; 1815—1836 | Succeeded by Carl Gustav Rosenorn |
| Preceded by Hans Nicolai Arctander | County Governor of Frederiksborg County; 1826—1836 | Succeeded by Hans Schack Knuth |
