= Komplett =

Norwegian appliance retailer

Komplett AS
- Company type: Public
- Industry: E-Commerce
- Founded: 1996
- Headquarters: Sandefjord, Norway
- Key people: Ole Vinje, CEO
- Products: Komplett
- Website: www.komplettgroup.com

Komplett AS is a Norwegian e-commerce company with nine webshops in 3 countries in Scandinavia. The main part of their product assortment is computers and components, but they have also expanded to include photographic, Hi-Fi, TV, gaming and white goods. The headquarters are located in Sandefjord, Norway where the company was founded. In addition to their Norwegian operations, Komplett also runs webshops in Sweden and Denmark, and distribution in Norway through the channels Norek and Itegra. Komplett has three call centers for sales and support in Sandefjord, Norway and Gothenburg, Sweden. Komplett has a distribution center and warehouses in Sandefjord, Norway. Company turnover in 2015, was 7.3 billion NOK with 800 employees and 1 800,000 active customers.

== History ==
Year	Significant event(s)
1991	Norek was established
1996	Introduced the first webshop, Komplett.no
1999	Norkom established as a result of a merger between Komplett and Norek
2000	Noted on the Oslo Stock Exchange (OSE) Komplett.se was established
2001	The first webshop outside of Scandinavia opens
2003	New warehouse set up in Tilburg, Netherlands to supply the web shops in Western Europe
2004	Introduced SAP as the new company ERP system
2005	Komplett introduced their own consumer finance solution
2007	Komplett bought the rights to the name of a new stadium for Sandefjord Fotball called Komplett.no Arena. In May, the company acquired their Swedish competitor, inWarehouse AB and took control of their webshop, inWarehouse.se along with their concept stores in Stockholm and Malmö. In October, Komplett ASA merged with Torp Computing Group ASA and took over the distributor Itegra AS with the webshops MPX.no and XD.no
2008	The UK, Germany, Austria and France webshops were closed on June 24 at 10 in the morning An additional warehouse of 14,000 m^{2} was opened adjacent to the existing distribution facilities in Sandefjord The Irish webshop pickup point, local office and RMA department was opened on September 1 to facilitate Komplett.ie customers The concept stores in Stockholm and Malmö was effectively sold to Mac Support on October 1
2010	European webshops sold to Netherlands-based Paradigit Holding B.V. Komplett.no was the first online store in Norway who organised Black Friday
2011	Delisted from Oslo Børs (the Norwegian stock exchange)
2013	Komplett acquires 100% stake in Webhallen Sverige AB, and Blush.no. A stake in Norsk Bildelsenter AS increased to 90.1% KomplettForsikring.no is also launched
2014	KomplettBank.no is launched. The company acquires 50.1% of Babybanden.no
2015	Komplett acquires Comtech.de Komplettreiser.no and Komplettapotek.no are launched
2016	Marked.no and Komplettmobil.no are launched
2017	MPX.no rebranded to KomplettBedrift.no. Komplett.no opens marketplace.
2018	Marked.no shuts down
2019	Verdane buys in Farmasiet.no (formerly Komplett Apotek), Blush, Norsk Bildelsenter and Sixbondstreet
2022	Komplett Group acquires NetOnNet

== Awards ==
Komplett was awarded the Farmand Prize (awarded by Farmand Activum) for best website in 2007 and they won the Gulltaggen the same year in the category Interactive Advertiser of the Year 2007.
