= Caroline Hagen Kjos =

Norwegian billionaire businesswoman

- Born: 1984 (age 41–42); Norway
- Education: Parsons School of Design
- Occupation: Businesswoman
- Known for: Richest woman in Norway
- Title: Chairman, Canica
- Spouse: Christer Kjos
- Children: 4
- Father: Stein Erik Hagen

Caroline Marie Hagen Kjos (born 1984) is a Norwegian businesswoman, heiress and billionaire based in Switzerland. In early 2018, she was the richest woman in Norway. In 2014, she was elected chairman of the board of the family holding company Canica. In 2014–2015, a clear majority of the company's share capital was also transferred to her. As of August 2023, Forbes estimated Hagen Kjos' assets at $2.1 billion.

== Biography ==
Hagen Kjos works as a project manager in the Swiss subsidiary of the family company. Hagen Kjos, who moved to the Canton of Schwyz, Switzerland in 2009 to promote low income and wealth taxes, inherited a majority stake in the company from her father, Stein Erik Hagen, in 2014. In 2015, Hagen Kjos' holding in the family's parent company, Canica, increased to 99.75%. As a result of the arrangements, Hagen now have a nominal value of only 0.25%, but these shares also carry 70% voting rights in the company's affairs. Canica is a major shareholder in Orkla ASA; Orkla has acquired several food companies in Finland, having merged with Orkla Foods Finland and Orkla Confectionery & Snacks; products include Panda confectionery and Taffel potato chips. Orkla's Chairman of the Board is Hagen, with Hagen Kjos as his alternate.

Hagen Kjos holds a bachelor's degree from the Parsons School of Design in New York City. She is married to Christer Kjos and they have two children.
