= Steen & Strøm =

Scandinavian real estate company

Steen & Strøm ASA
- Company type: Public
- Industry: Real estate
- Founded: 1797
- Headquarters: Oslo, Norway
- Area served: Scandinavia
- Key people: Marie Congnac (CEO); Peter Arne Ruzicka (Chairman)
- Products: Shopping centres
- Revenue: ▲NOK 2,010 million (2006)
- Operating income: NOK 1,762 million (2006)
- Net income: NOK 1,084 million (2006)
- Number of employees: 252 (2007)
- Website: www.steenstrom.no

Steen & Strøm is a Scandinavian retail and real estate company that owns and operates 10 shopping centres in Norway, Sweden and Denmark.

It has been a member of the International Association of Department Stores from 1940 to 1992, with various CEOs acting as presidents of the Association over time.

== History ==
The company was founded in 1797 when Samuel Strøm started a wine shop and general store in Oslo. When he died in 1818, the store was taken over by his widow Else Strøm, then their common son Christian Strøm in 1829. In 1856 Christian Strøm, shortly before his death, passed it on to his nephew and adoptive son Samuel Strøm Jr. (son of Søren Strøm) and the husband of his adoptive daughter (Ovidia born Jebe) Emil Steen. The name Steen & Strøm was then established. Samuel Strøm Jr. died in 1876, and Emil Steen brought the widow of Samuel Jr Augusta Strøm on board as partner. In 1884 the next generation took over, with Christian Steen, Johan Steen and Christian Strøm Jr. as partners. The next generation after that entered the company with Erling Steen and Eyvind Strøm in 1914; and Nils Steen in 1919. The three took over the company in the 1930s. Another family member Emil Steen was just a board member, but his son Christian Steen became chief executive in 1964.

In 1874 the company built the first department store in Norway, but it was destroyed in a fire in 1929. By 1930 a brand new store had been rebuilt, with architectural inspiration from Paris. In 1991 Agora Drift AS took over the management of Steen & Strøm, as well as five other shopping centres and three hotels, and started expanding.

In July 1994 the company was listed on the Oslo Stock Exchange, but delisted again in September 2007 after Stein Erik Hagen had bought out the other owners, at the time Canica (49,9%), Storebrand (12.9%), Orkla (10.3%), Stein Erik Hagen (5.9%) and Varner-Gruppen (5.5%). In 2008 the company was sold for NOK 21.9 billion to Klépierre (56.1%) and ABP Pension Fund (43.9%).
