= Emil Steen (1870–1915) =

Emil Steen (20 February 1870 – 20 July 1915) was a Norwegian businessperson.

He was born in Kristiania as a son of Emil Steen (1829–1884) and a brother of Johan and Christian Steen. His father and two brothers were owners of Steen & Strøm. Emil Steen followed other ventures, however, and became a partner in Nyegaard & Co. around 1900. Founder Morten Nyegaard backed out in 1901, and Steen partnered up with Nyegaard's co-founder Theodor Haslund until Haslund backed out in 1906. Fredrik L. Christensen was then Steen's partner until 1913, when Steen became sole owner. Steen was behind the transformation of the company from a wholesaling company to a manufacturer of pharmaceutical products. The company has since been renamed Nycomed and gone multi-national.

Emil Steen died in July 1915 in Moss. Marshals at his funeral were wholesaler Laurantzon and Halfdan Swensen. After his death, his widow Laura Steen took over the company; in 1921 their son Fredrik Steen took over. He eventually brought in new co-owners. Emil Steen was also an uncle of Erling Steen, who became Steen & Strøm director.
