= Rimi (Norway) =

Defunct Norwegian discount supermarket chain

RIMI
- Company type: Discount store
- Founded: 1977
- Founder: Stein Erik Hagen
- Defunct: 2016
- Fate: discontinued
- Number of locations: 279
- Area served: Norway
- Owner: ICA
- Website: www.rimi.no

RIMI was a grocery store chain in Norway.

The discount supermarket is best known for its slogan, "Consistently low prices" (Faste lave priser). The supermarket business can trace itself back to 1977. It was founded as the discount grocery store chain RIMI 500 by Norwegian businessman Stein Erik Hagen. Starting in 1992, Hagen sold an interest in the chain to the Swedish group, ICA AB. In 1998, Hagen and ICA reached an agreement to sell a half interest in the business to the Dutch-based group, Koninklijke Ahold N.V. In 2004, Hagen sold his remaining interest in RIMI.

From 2004 to 2014, RIMI was owned and operated by ICA Norge. In 2012, Ahold sold its share of ICA Norge to ICA AB, leaving Rimi under fully Swedish ownership. After years of heavy losses and multiple attempts to rebrand itself, ICA AB sold all its shares in ICA Norge to Coop Norge. The new owners soon decided to discontinue RIMI, and have started a program to convert all Rimi stores to their own retail concepts, and as a result the name of the shop continues only in the Baltics.

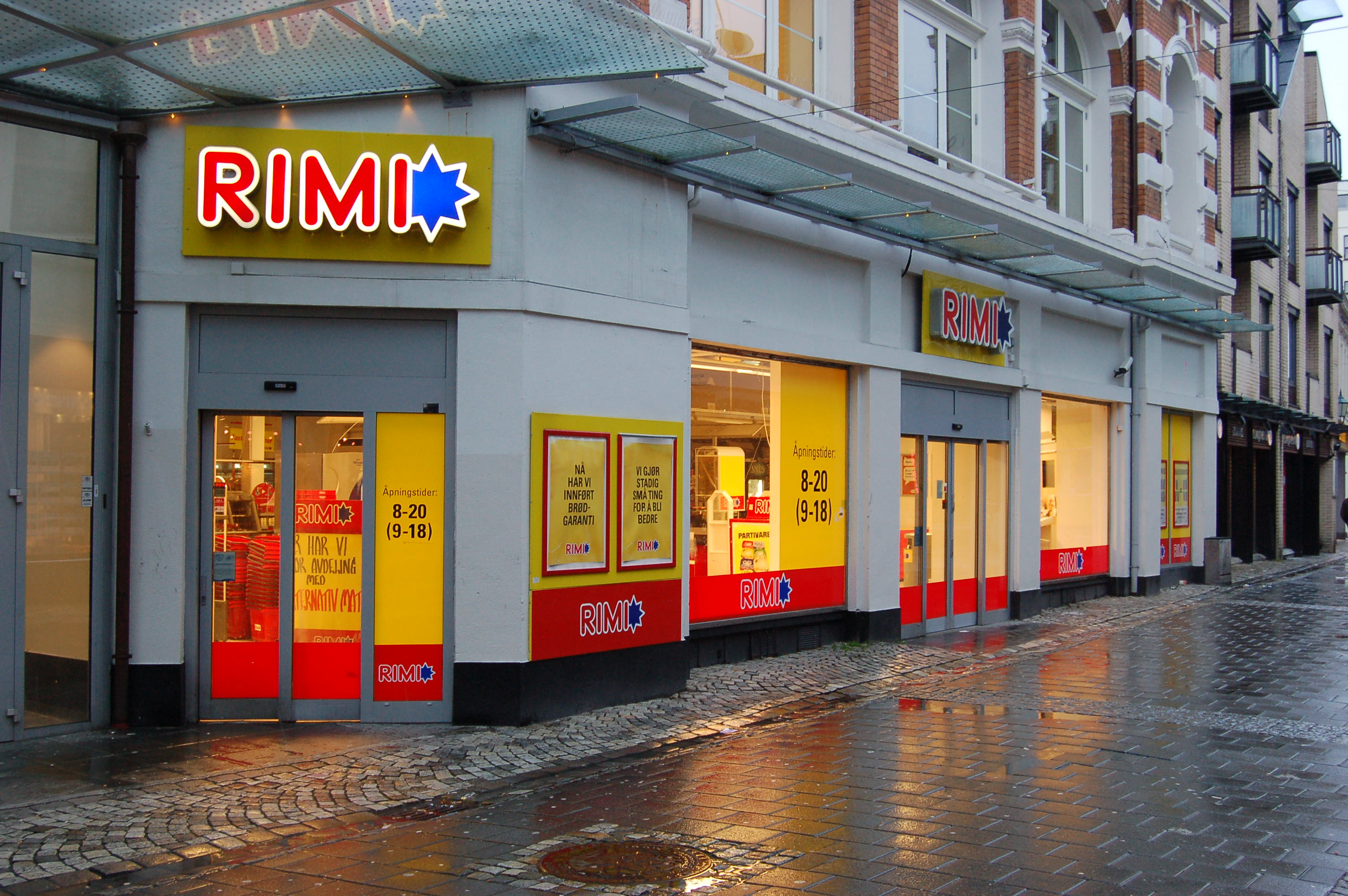
RIMI store in Bergen, using the old logotype

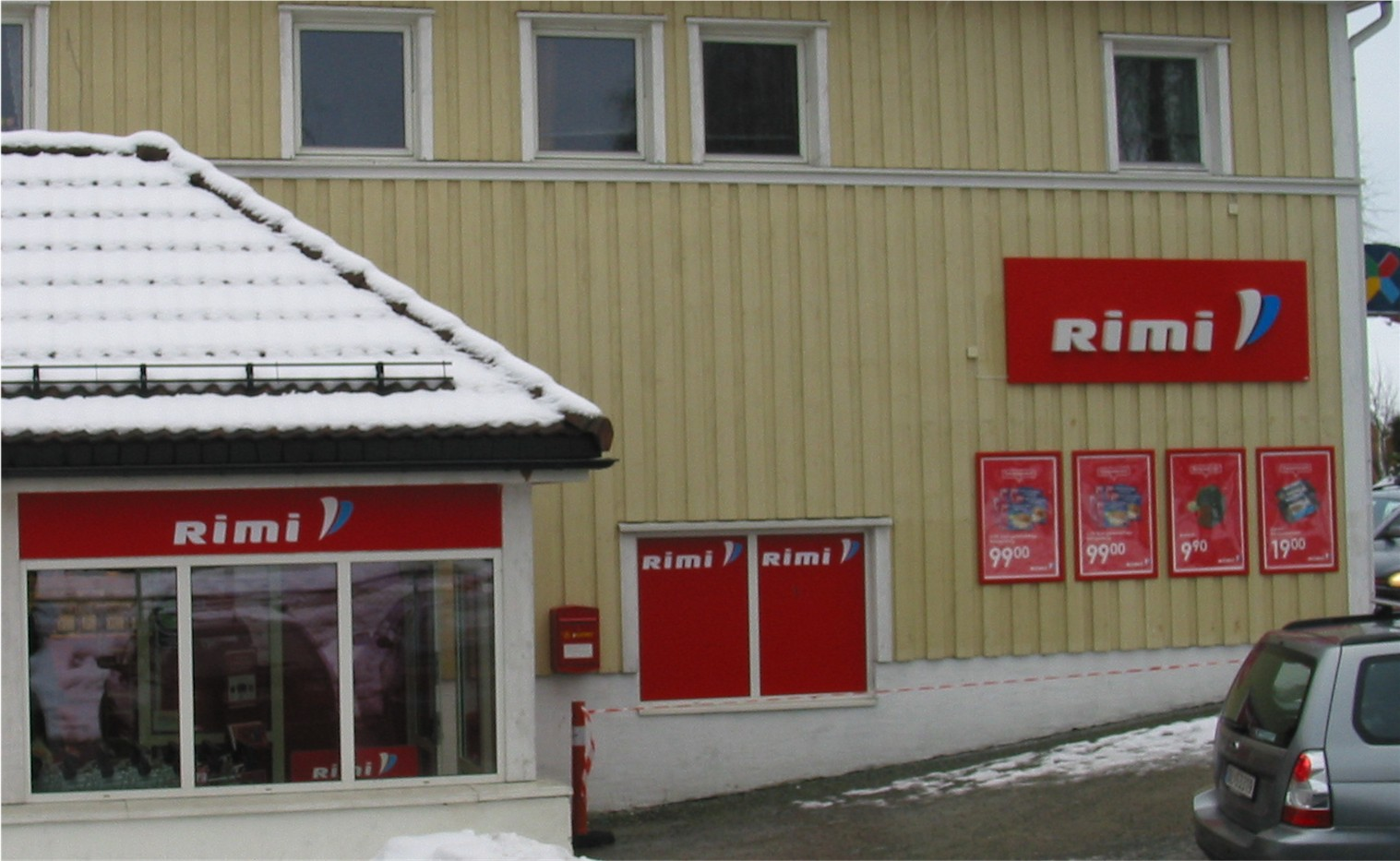
RIMI store in Jar, using the new logotype

== See also ==
- Rimi Baltic
