= Emil Steen (1828–1884) =

Peter Emil Steen (1828–1884) was a Norwegian ship-owner and businessperson.

Steen was a son of Daniel Steen, a merchant in Laurvig. He is best known as the founder of Steen & Strøm, a company that he created in 1856 with Samuel Strøm, Jr. The firm was a continuation of a business of Strøm's that began in 1797, in which Steen had worked since 1847. When Strøm died in 1876, Emil Steen brought his widow Augusta Strøm on board as partner. The company was involved in shipping during this period.

Together with Ovidia Laurenze Jebe (1829–1905), Emil Steen had three sons: Johan Steen, Christian Steen and Emil Steen. The next generation took over Steen & Strøm in 1884, with Johan Steen, Christian Steen and Christian Strøm, Jr. as the three partners. Johan's son Erling became a partner in the business in 1914.
