= Nord-Frøya Municipality =

Former municipality in Trøndelag, Norway

Nord-Frøya Municipality Nord-Frøya herred
- Former municipality
- Nordfrøya herred (historic name)
- Sør-Trøndelag within Norway

- Nord-Frøya within Sør-Trøndelag
- Coordinates: 63°47′44″N 08°48′28″E
- Country: Norway
- County: Sør-Trøndelag
- District: Fosen
- Established: 1 Jan 1906
  - Preceded by: Frøien Municipality
- Disestablished: 1 Jan 1964
  - Succeeded by: Frøya Municipality
- Administrative centre: Svellingen

Government
  - Mayor (1960–1963): Oskar Steinvik (Ap)

Area (upon dissolution)
  - Total: 138.6 km^{2} (53.5 sq mi)
  - Rank: #450 in Norway
- Highest elevation: 75 m (246 ft)

Population (1963)
  - Total: 4,362
  - Rank: #202 in Norway
  - Density: 31.5/km^{2} (82/sq mi)
  - Change (10 years): ▼ −1.7%
- Demonym: Nord-Frøyværing

Official language
  - Norwegian form: Neutral
- Time zone: UTC+01:00 (CET)
  - Summer (DST): UTC+02:00 (CEST)
- ISO 3166 code: NO-1620

Nord-Frøya is a former municipality in the old Sør-Trøndelag county, Norway. The 139-square-kilometre (54 sq mi) municipality existed from 1906 until its dissolution in 1964. Nord-Frøya Municipality included the northern part of the island of Frøya and all of the small islands to the north and northeast such as Sula, Mausund, Froan, and Halten in what is now Frøya Municipality in Trøndelag county. The main church for the municipality was Nord-Frøya Church (now called Sletta Church) which is located at Svellingen (the administrative centre of the municipality) on the northern coast of the island.

Prior to its dissolution in 1964, the 138.6-square-kilometre (53.5 sq mi) municipality was the 450th largest by area out of the 689 municipalities in Norway. Nord-Frøya Municipality was the 202nd most populous municipality in Norway with a population of about 4,362. The municipality's population density was 31.5 inhabitants per square kilometre (82/sq mi) and its population had decreased by 1.7% over the previous 10-year period.

== General information ==
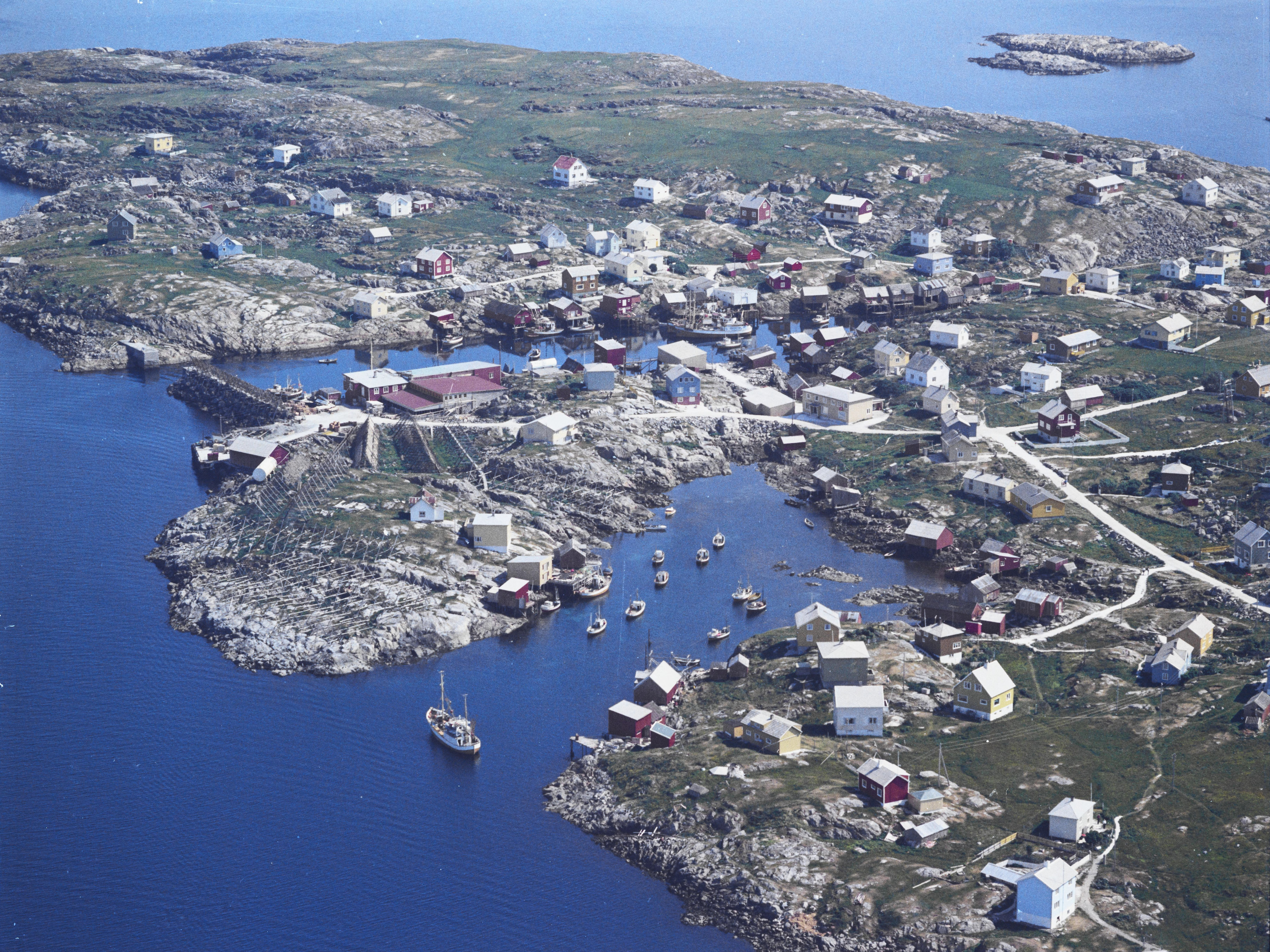
View of the village of Mausundvær

The municipality was established on 1 January 1906 when the old Frøien Municipality was divided into two new municipalities: Sør-Frøya Municipality in the south (population: 2,091) and Nord-Frøya Municipality in the north (population: 3,972). During the 1960s, there were many municipal mergers across Norway due to the work of the Schei Committee. On 1 January 1964, Sør-Frøya Municipality (population: 2,208) and Nord-Frøya Municipality (population: 4,348) were merged (back together) to form the new Frøya Municipality.

=== Name ===
The municipality is named after the island of Frøya. The prefix nord means "northern", literally meaning the northern part of Frøya. The second part of the name comes from Norse mythology. Although Frøya is a variant of the name of the Norse goddess Freyja, the Old Norse form of the name of the island was Frøy or Frey (the ending -a in the modern form is actually the definite article - so the meaning of Frøya is 'the Frøy'). Therefore, the name of the island probably has the same root as the name of the Norse god Freyr, brother to Freyja. The names originally were titles: "lord" or "lady". The oldest meaning of the common word was "(the one) in front; the foremost, the leading" and here in the sense "the island in front of Hitra". Until 1906, the name of the island and predecessor municipality was spelled Frøien (-en is the definite article in Danish-Norwegian). When this new municipality was established in 1906, the name of the municipality was spelled Nordfrøya. On 3 November 1917, a royal resolution changed the spelling of the name of the municipality to Nord-Frøya.

=== Churches ===
The Church of Norway had one parish (sokn) within Nord-Frøya Municipality. At the time of the municipal dissolution, it was part of the Frøya prestegjeld and the Sør-Fosen prosti (deanery) in the Diocese of Nidaros.

Churches in Nord-Frøya Municipality
Parish (sokn)	Church name	Location of the church	Year built
Nord-Frøya	Nord-Frøya Church	Sletta (just east of Svellingen)	1880
Nord-Frøya	Froan Chapel	Froan	1904
Nord-Frøya	Måøy Chapel	Mausund	1939
Nord-Frøya	Sula Chapel	Sula	1925

== Geography ==
The municipality was primarily located on the northern part of the island of Frøya along with many smaller islands and islets. The highest point in the municipality was the 75-metre (246 ft) tall mountain Besselvassheia, on the border with Sør-Frøya Municipality. The municipality was bordered by Sør-Frøya Municipality to the south.

== Government ==
While it existed, Nord-Frøya Municipality was responsible for primary education (through 10th grade), outpatient health services, senior citizen services, welfare and other social services, zoning, economic development, and municipal roads and utilities. The municipality was governed by a municipal council of directly elected representatives. The mayor was indirectly elected by a vote of the municipal council. The municipality was under the jurisdiction of the Frostating Court of Appeal.

=== Municipal council ===
The municipal council (Herredsstyre) of Nord-Frøya Municipality was made up of 29 representatives that were elected to four year terms. The tables below show the historical composition of the council by political party.

Nord-Frøya herredsstyre 1959–1963
Party name (in Norwegian)	Number of representatives
Labour Party (Arbeiderpartiet)	15
Conservative Party (Høyre)	4
Christian Democratic Party (Kristelig Folkeparti)	5
Liberal Party (Venstre)	5
Total number of members:	29

Nord-Frøya herredsstyre 1955–1959
Party name (in Norwegian)	Number of representatives
Labour Party (Arbeiderpartiet)	14
Conservative Party (Høyre)	3
Christian Democratic Party (Kristelig Folkeparti)	5
Liberal Party (Venstre)	7
Total number of members:	29

Nord-Frøya herredsstyre 1951–1955
Party name (in Norwegian)	Number of representatives
Labour Party (Arbeiderpartiet)	9
Conservative Party (Høyre)	2
Christian Democratic Party (Kristelig Folkeparti)	3
Liberal Party (Venstre)	5
Local List(s) (Lokale lister)	1
Total number of members:	20

Nord-Frøya herredsstyre 1947–1951
Party name (in Norwegian)	Number of representatives
Labour Party (Arbeiderpartiet)	6
Conservative Party (Høyre)	3
Christian Democratic Party (Kristelig Folkeparti)	4
Liberal Party (Venstre)	7
Total number of members:	20

Nord-Frøya herredsstyre 1945–1947
Party name (in Norwegian)	Number of representatives
Labour Party (Arbeiderpartiet)	9
Conservative Party (Høyre)	1
Christian Democratic Party (Kristelig Folkeparti)	3
Liberal Party (Venstre)	6
Local List(s) (Lokale lister)	1
Total number of members:	20

Nord-Frøya herredsstyre 1937–1941*
Party name (in Norwegian)	Number of representatives
Labour Party (Arbeiderpartiet)	8
Liberal Party (Venstre)	8
Joint list of the Conservative Party (Høyre) and the Free-minded People's Party (Frisinnede Folkeparti)	4
Total number of members:	20
Note: Due to the German occupation of Norway during World War II, no elections were held for new municipal councils until after the war ended in 1945.

=== Mayors ===
The mayor (Norwegian: ordfører) of Nord-Frøya Municipality was the political leader of the municipality and the chairperson of the municipal council. Here is a list of people who held this position:

- 1906–1907: Martin Sivertsen (V)
- 1908–1910: Berntinus Dragsnæss (H)
- 1911–1911: John Lorntsen Uttian (V)
- 1912–1913: Jacob Meland
- 1914–1916: Lorentz Fredagsvik (V)
- 1917–1922: Andreas O. Eidsvaag (V)
- 1923–1925: Ole Aukan (H)
- 1926–1928: Andreas O. Eidsvaag (V)
- 1929–1934: John Lorntsen Uttian (V)
- 1935–1937: Ole Aukan (H)
- 1938–1940: Andreas O. Eidsvaag (V)
- 1940–1944: Bengt J. Tørum (NS)
- 1944–1945: Einar Meland (NS)
- 1945–1945: Andreas O. Eidsvaag (V)
- 1946–1951: Kristian Hammer (V)
- 1952–1955: Oskar Steinvik (Ap)
- 1956–1959: Gunnar Halset (V)
- 1960–1963: Oskar Steinvik (Ap)

== See also ==
- List of former municipalities of Norway
