= Åssiden Church =

Church in Buskerud, Norway

- Åssiden kirke
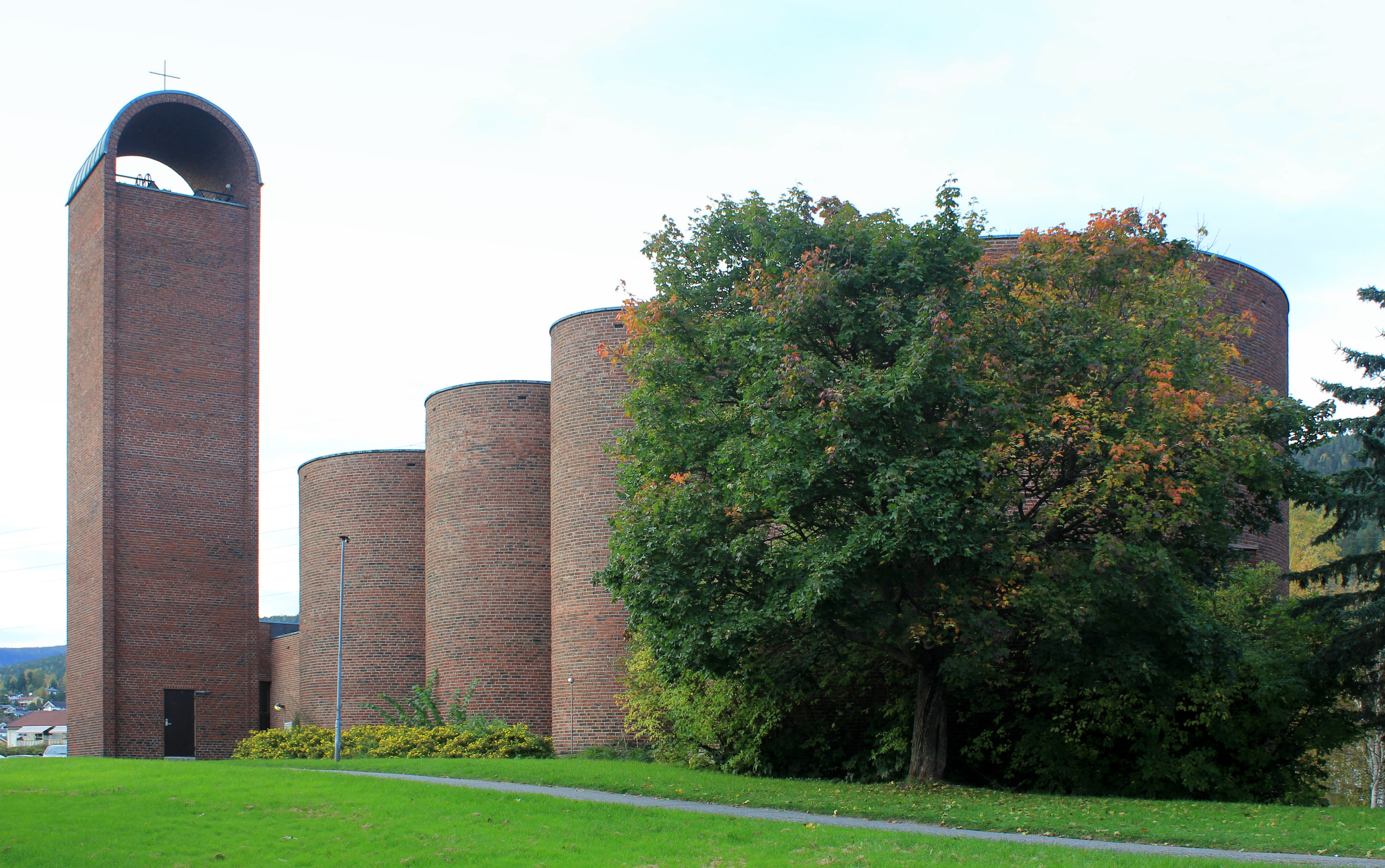
- View of the church
- Åssiden Church
- 59°45′15″N 10°08′35″E
- Location: Drammen Municipality, Buskerud
- Country: Norway
- Denomination: Church of Norway
- Churchmanship: Evangelical Lutheran

History
- Status: Parish church
- Founded: 1967
- Consecrated: 14 Apr 1967

Architecture
- Functional status: Active
- Architect: Harald Hille
- Architectural type: Rectangular
- Completed: 1967 (59 years ago)

Specifications
- Capacity: 350
- Materials: Brick

Administration
- Diocese: Tunsberg bispedømme
- Deanery: Drammen og Lier prosti
- Parish: Åssiden
- Norwegian Cultural Heritage Site
- Type: Church
- Status: Listed

Åssiden Church (Norwegian: Åssiden kirke) is a parish church of the Church of Norway in Drammen Municipality in Buskerud county, Norway. It is located in the borough of Åssiden in the city of Drammen. It is the church for the Åssiden parish which is part of the Drammen og Lier prosti (deanery) in the Diocese of Tunsberg. The red brick church was built in a rectangular design in 1967 using plans drawn up by the architect Harald Hille. The church seats about 350 people.

== History ==
It was not until the 1960s that population growth in the area of Åssiden led to the building of a church. It was designed by Harald Hille and Odd Østbye and consecrated by the bishop on 14 April 1967.

== Media gallery ==

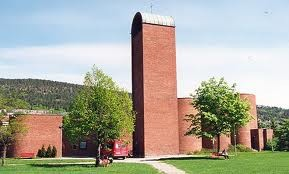

== See also ==
- List of churches in Tunsberg
