= Sletringen Lighthouse =

Coastal lighthouse in Trøndelag, Norway

Slettringen Lighthouse Slettringen fyrstasjon
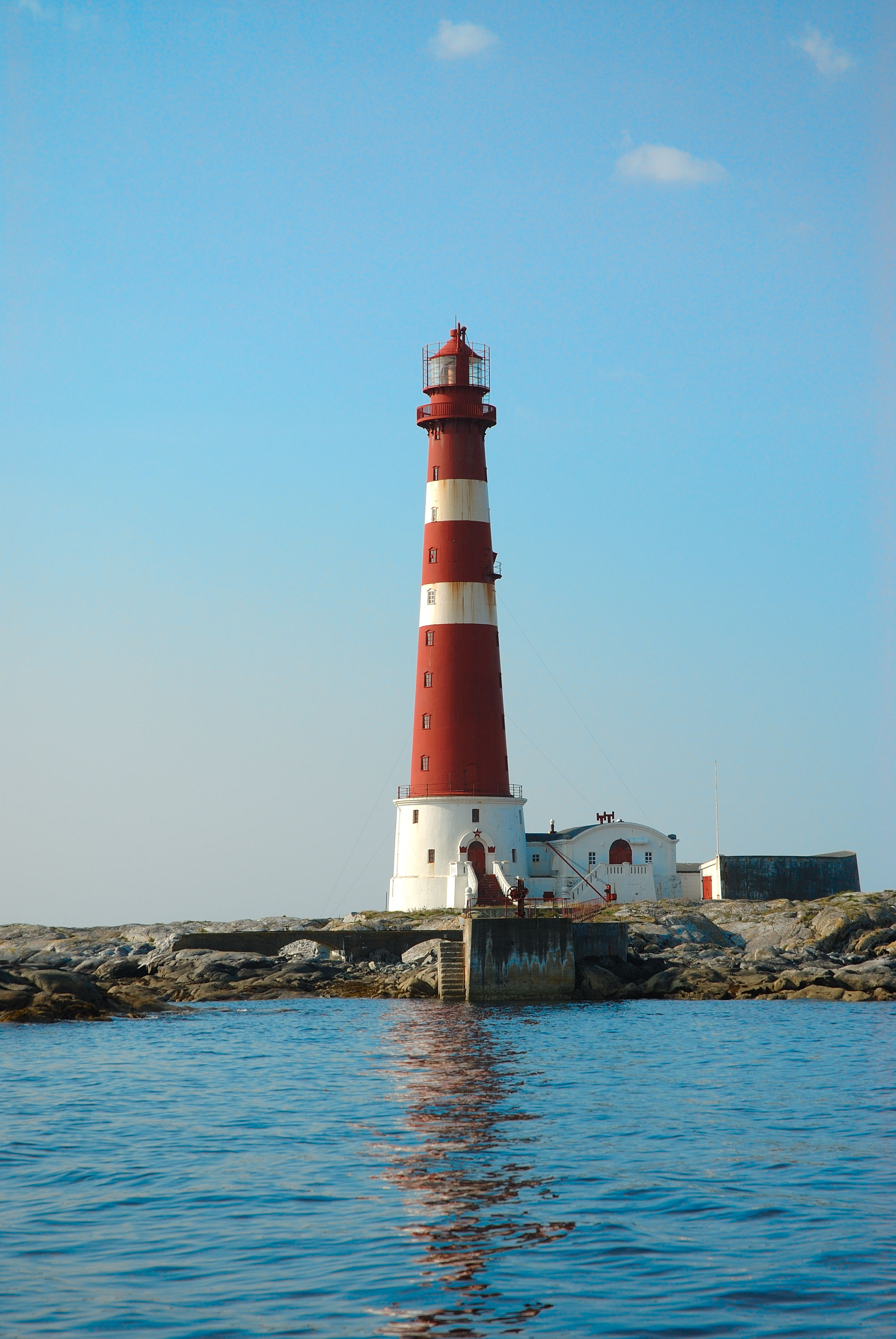
- View of the lighthouse
- Location: Titran, Trøndelag, Norway
- Coordinates: 63.6661°N 08.2625°E

Tower
- Constructed: 1899
- Foundation: Concrete
- Construction: Cast iron
- Automated: 1988–1993
- Height: 45 m (148 ft)
- Shape: Cylindrical
- Markings: Red with 2 white bands and white base
- Heritage: cultural property

Light
- Focal height: 46 m (151 ft)
- Intensity: 2,700,000 candelas
- Range: 18 1/2 nmi (34 km)
- Characteristic: Fl(2) W 15 s
- Norway no.: 446800

Slettringen Lighthouse (Norwegian: Slettringen fyr) is a coastal lighthouse in Frøya Municipality in Trøndelag county, Norway. The lighthouse sits just off the coast of the village of Titran at the western tip of the large island of Frøya. It is Norway's tallest lighthouse. The lighthouse is lit from July 21 until May 16 each year. Although south of the Arctic Circle, it is not lit during the summer due to the white nights in Norway. The lighthouse is also equipped with a foghorn.

The 45-metre-tall (148 ft) cylindrical, cast iron tower is painted red with a white base and two horizontal white stripes around it. The tower is attached to a two-story lighthouse keeper's house. The main light sits at an elevation of 46 m (151 ft) above sea level. It is a white light that flashes twice every 15 seconds. A first-order Fresnel lens has been in use since 1923. Part way up the tower, a secondary light is also located about 31.5 metres (103 ft) up the side of the tower. The secondary light is a white isophase light that is on for two seconds and off for two seconds. The main light can be seen for 18 1/2 nautical miles (34 kilometres) in all directions and the secondary light can be seen for up to 14.6 nautical miles (27 kilometres), but only from one side of the tower.

The lighthouse was built in 1899 and it was automated in 1993. The lighthouse lost power in 2008, and the power supply was out for some time.

== Media gallery ==
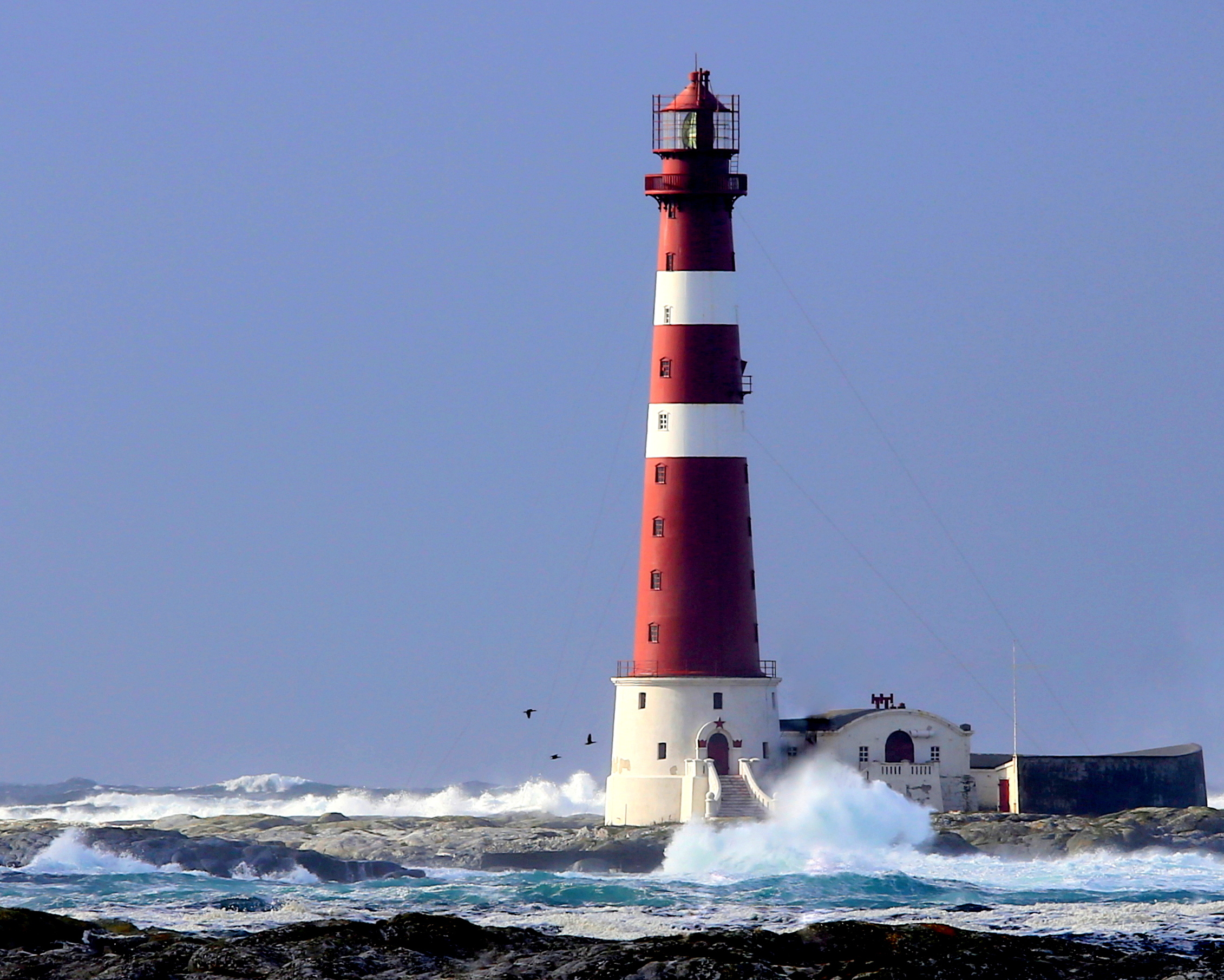

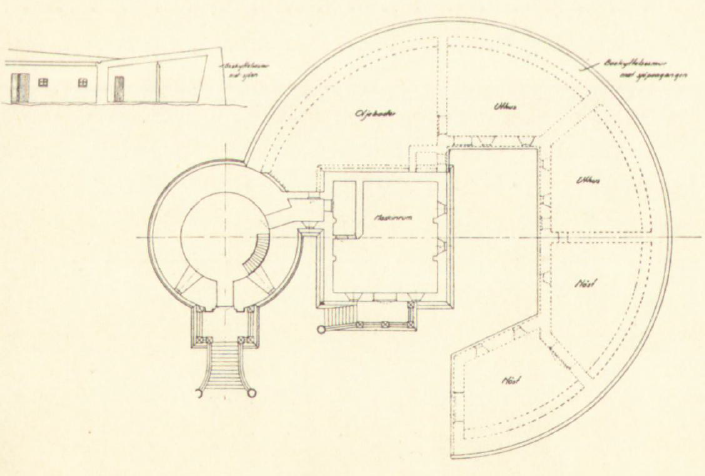

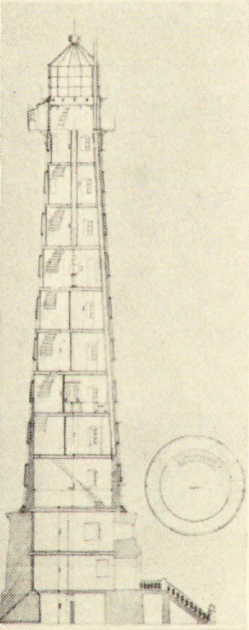

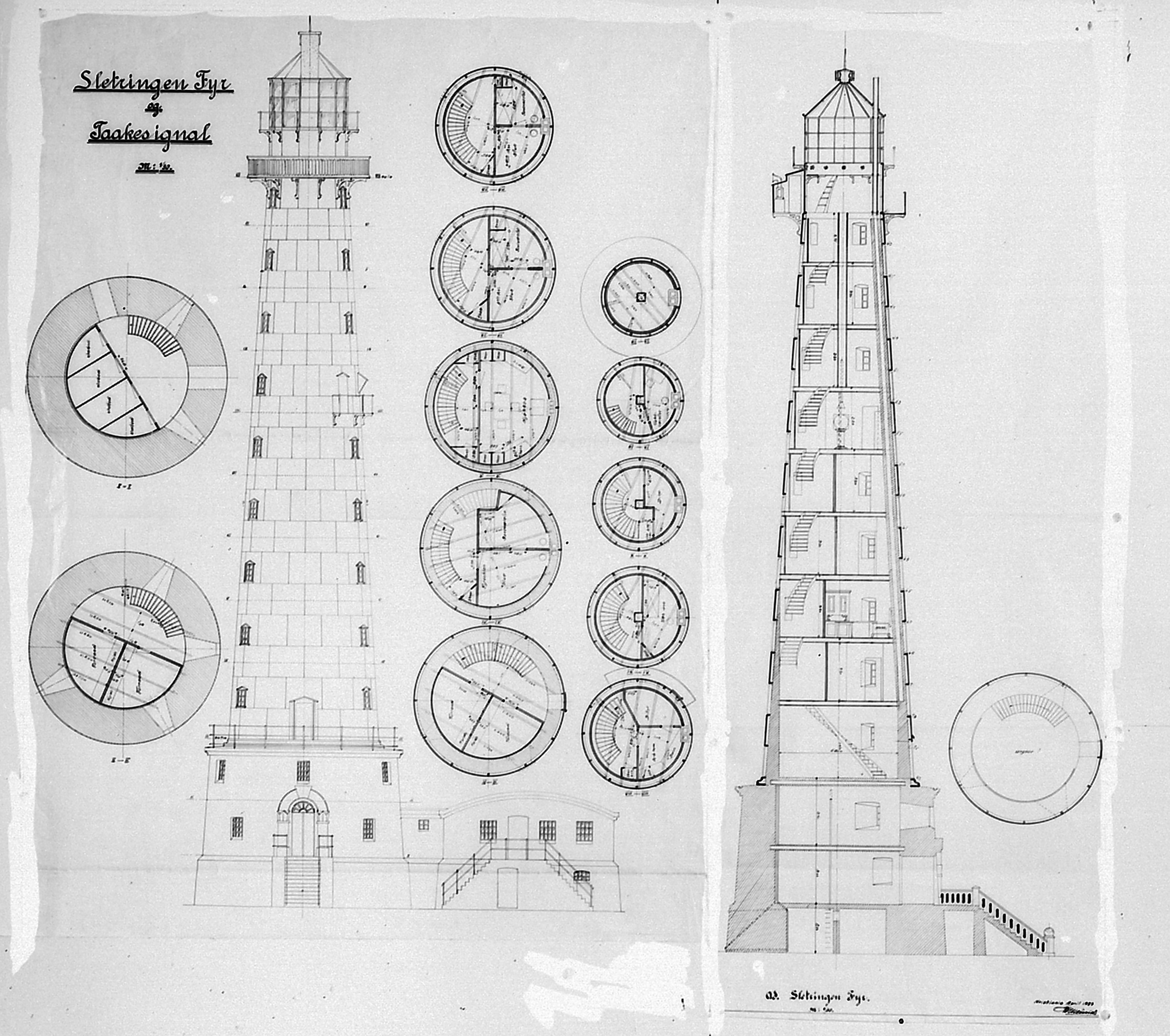

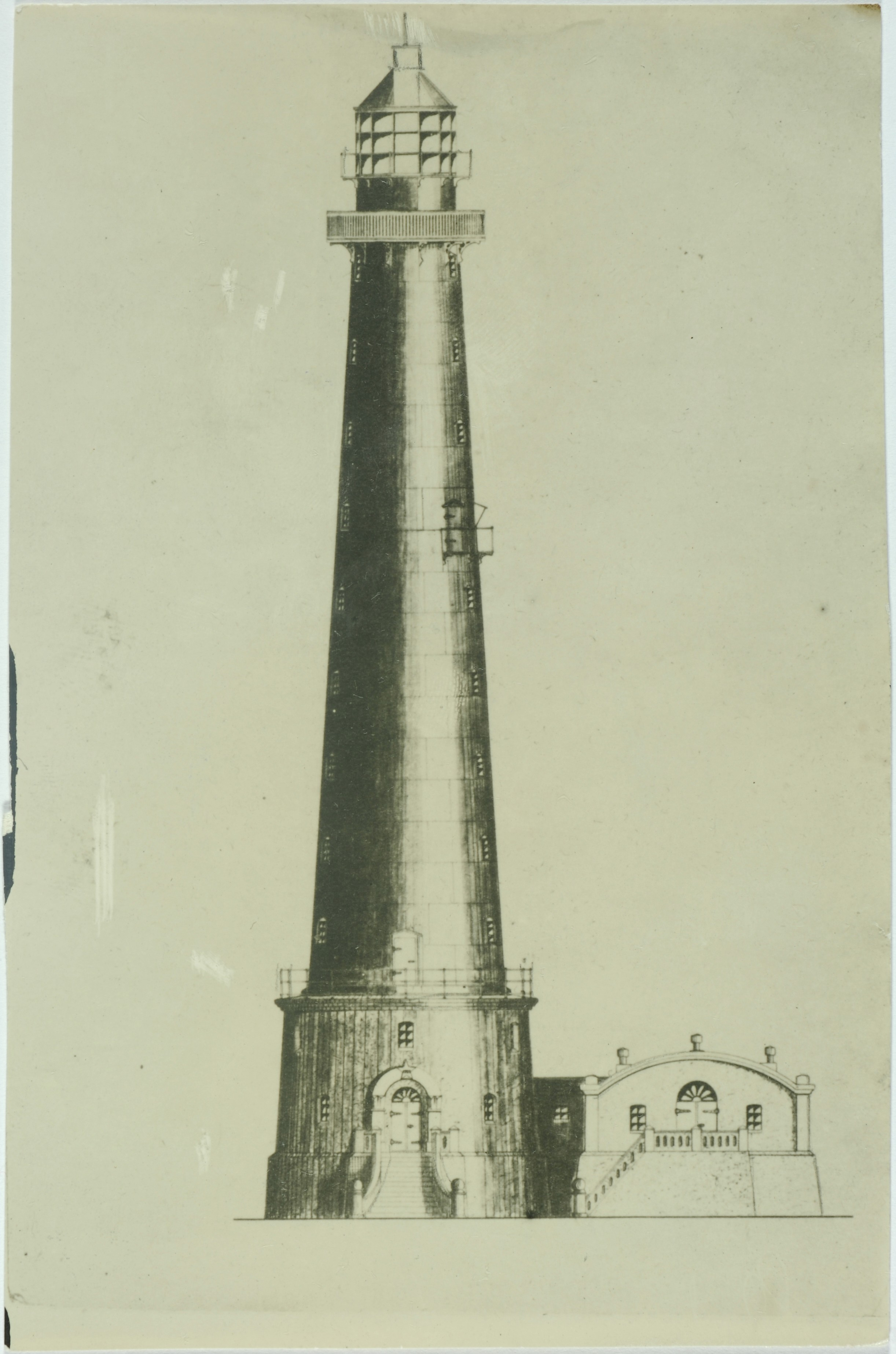

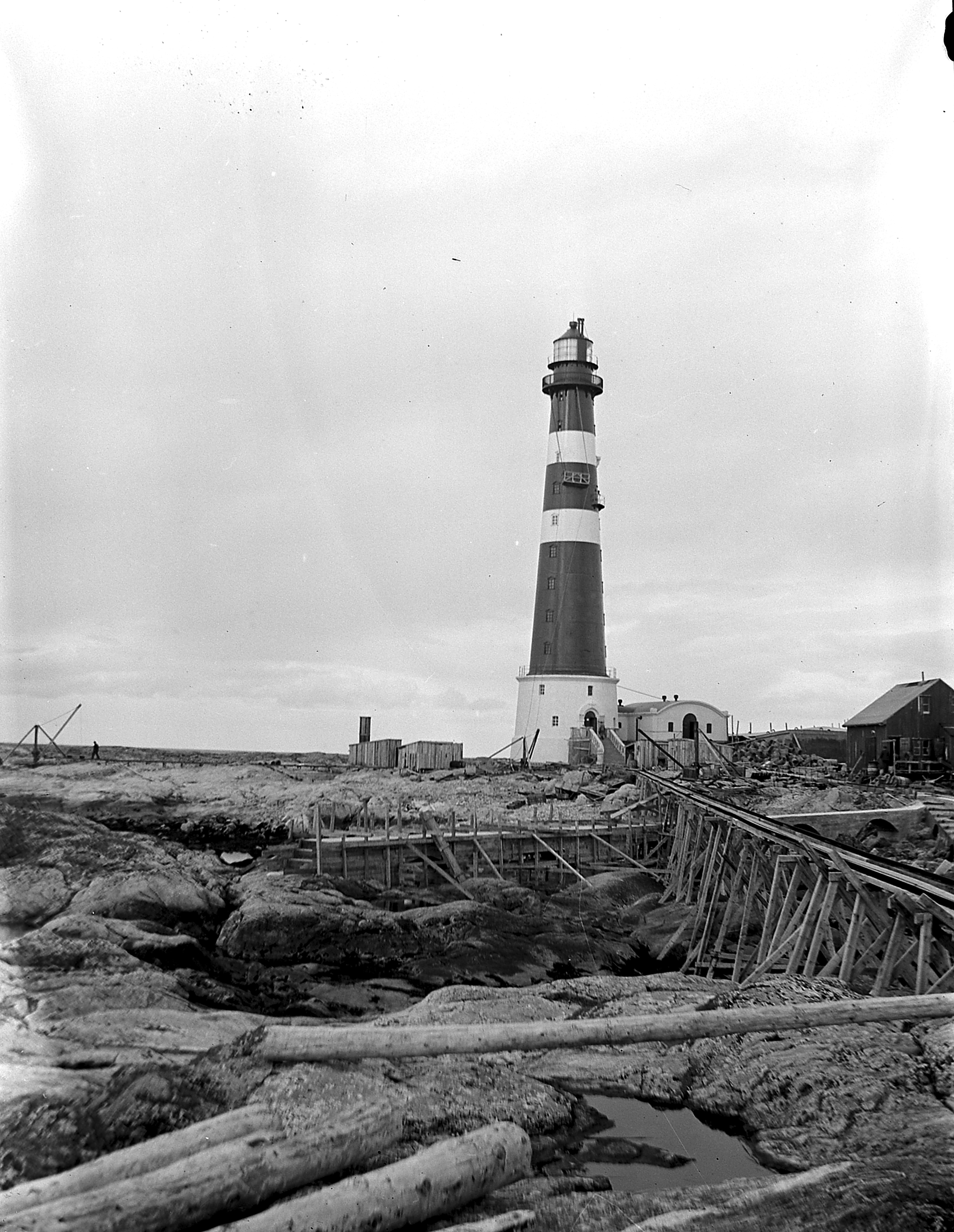

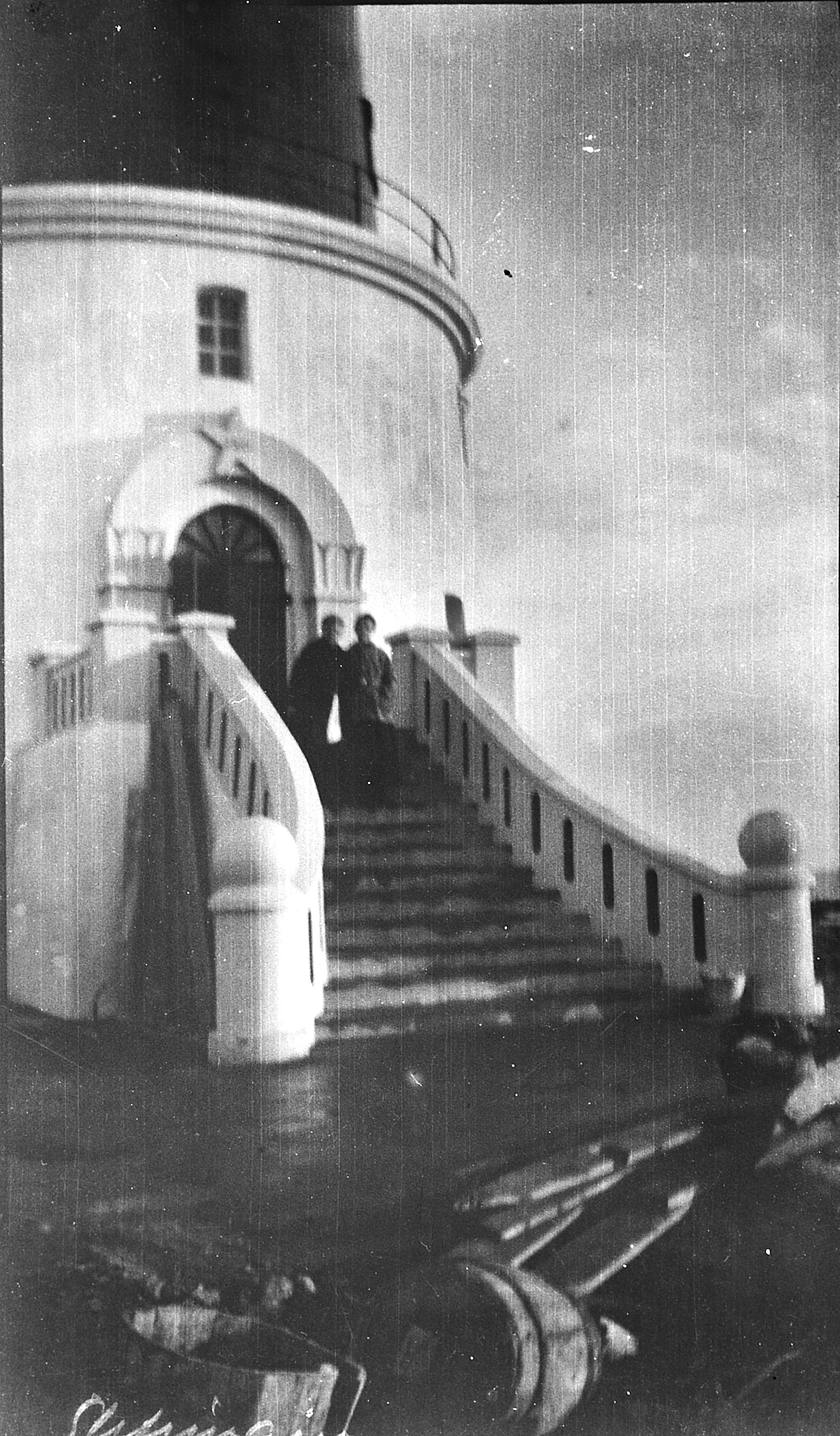

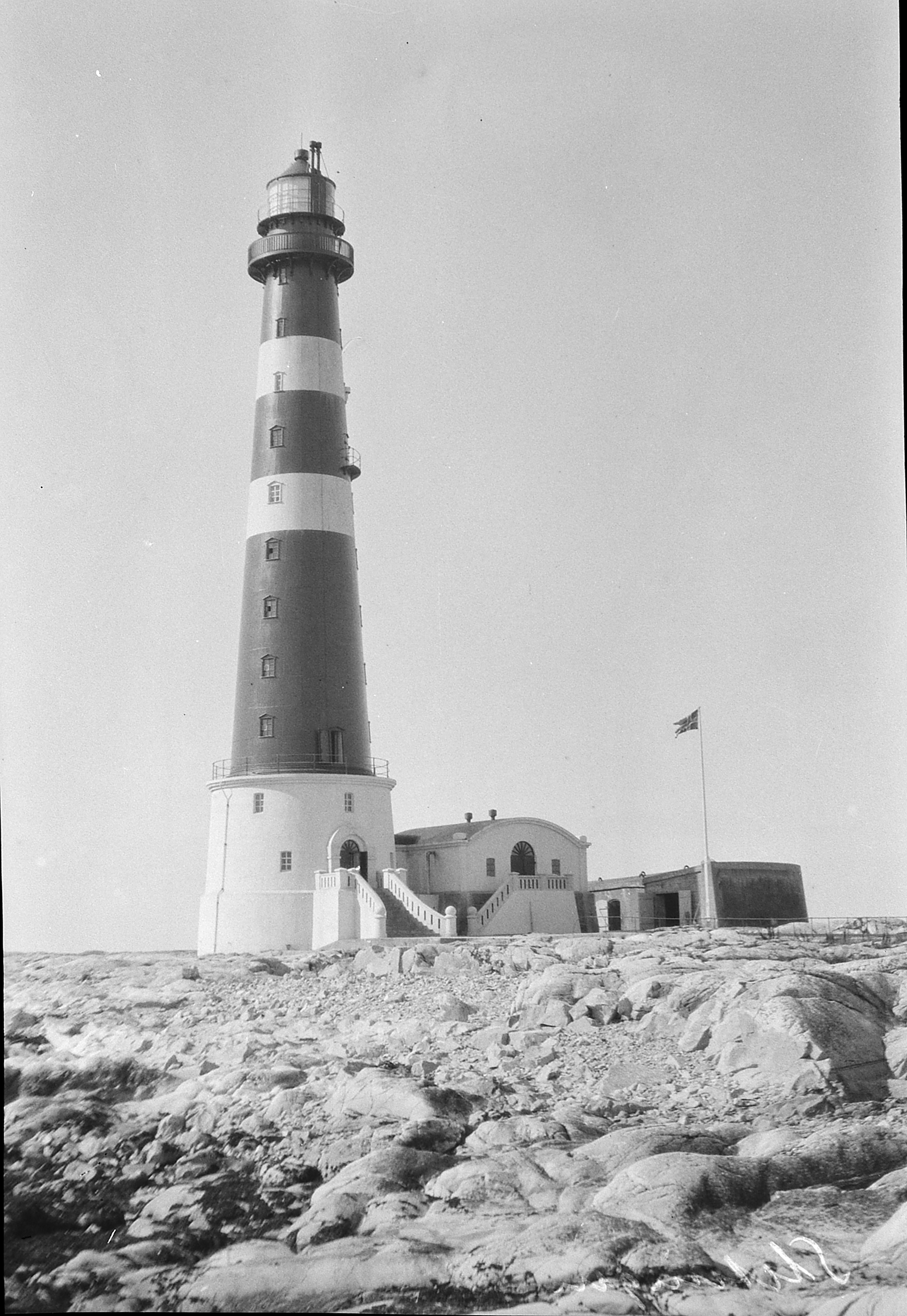

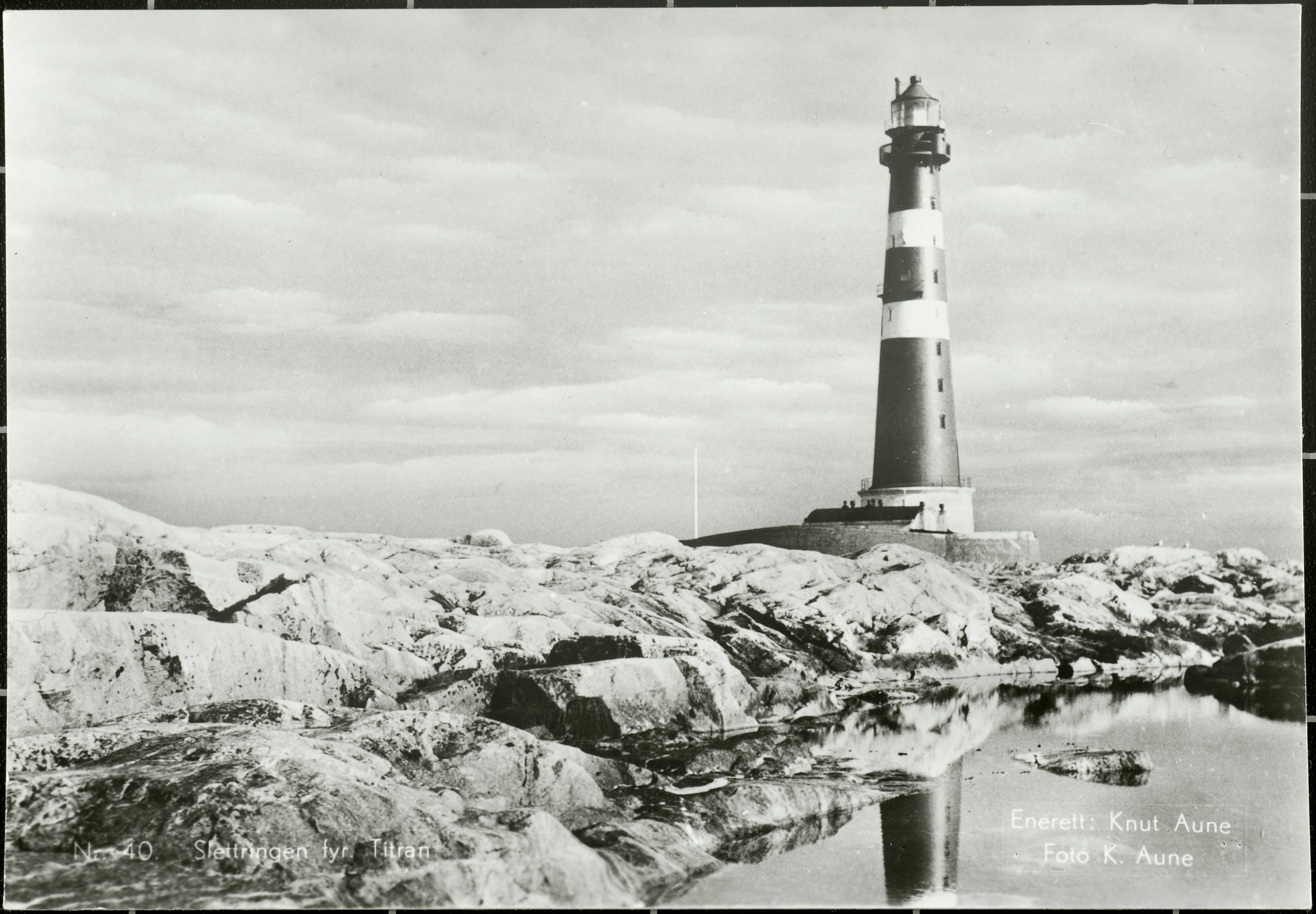

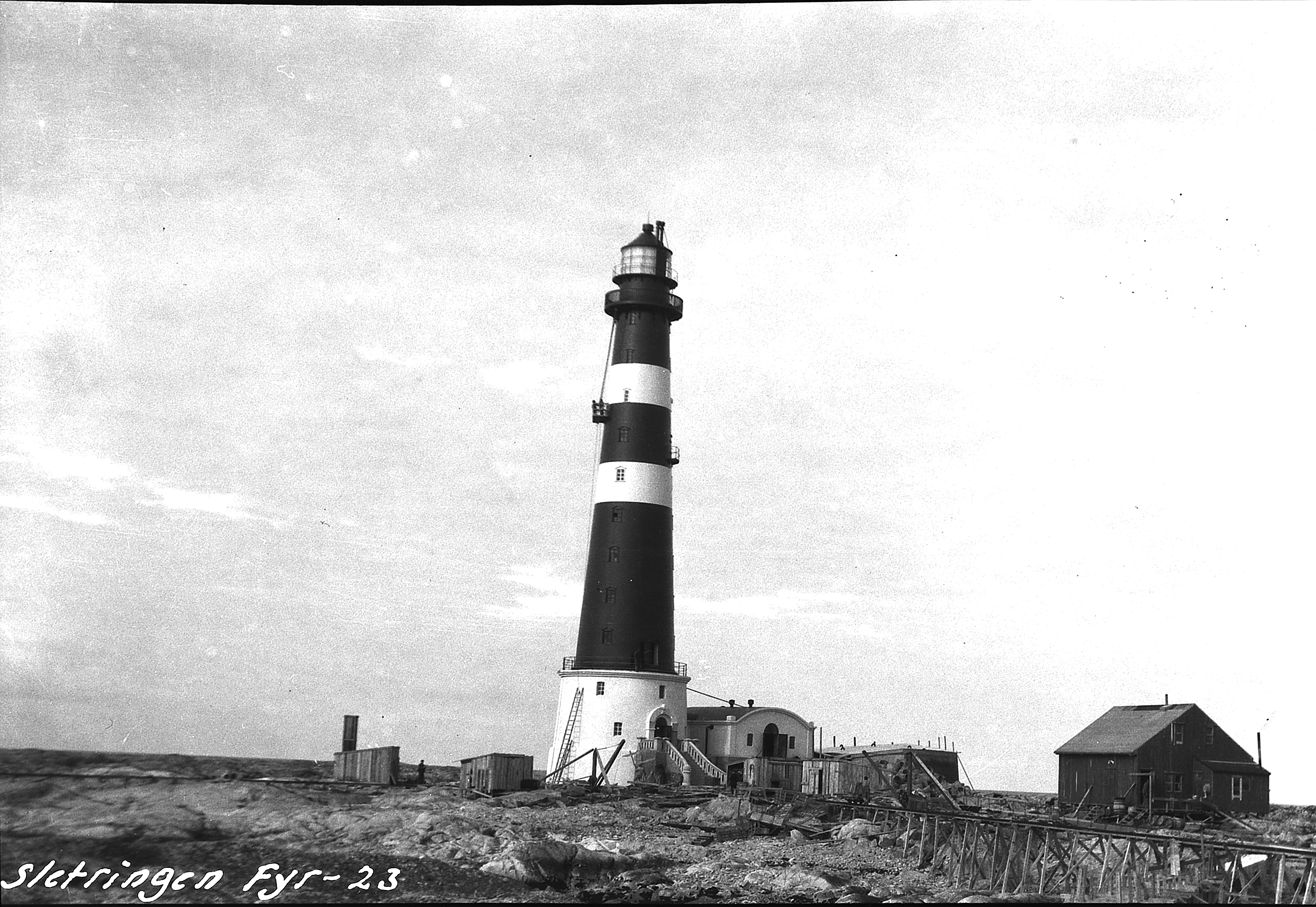

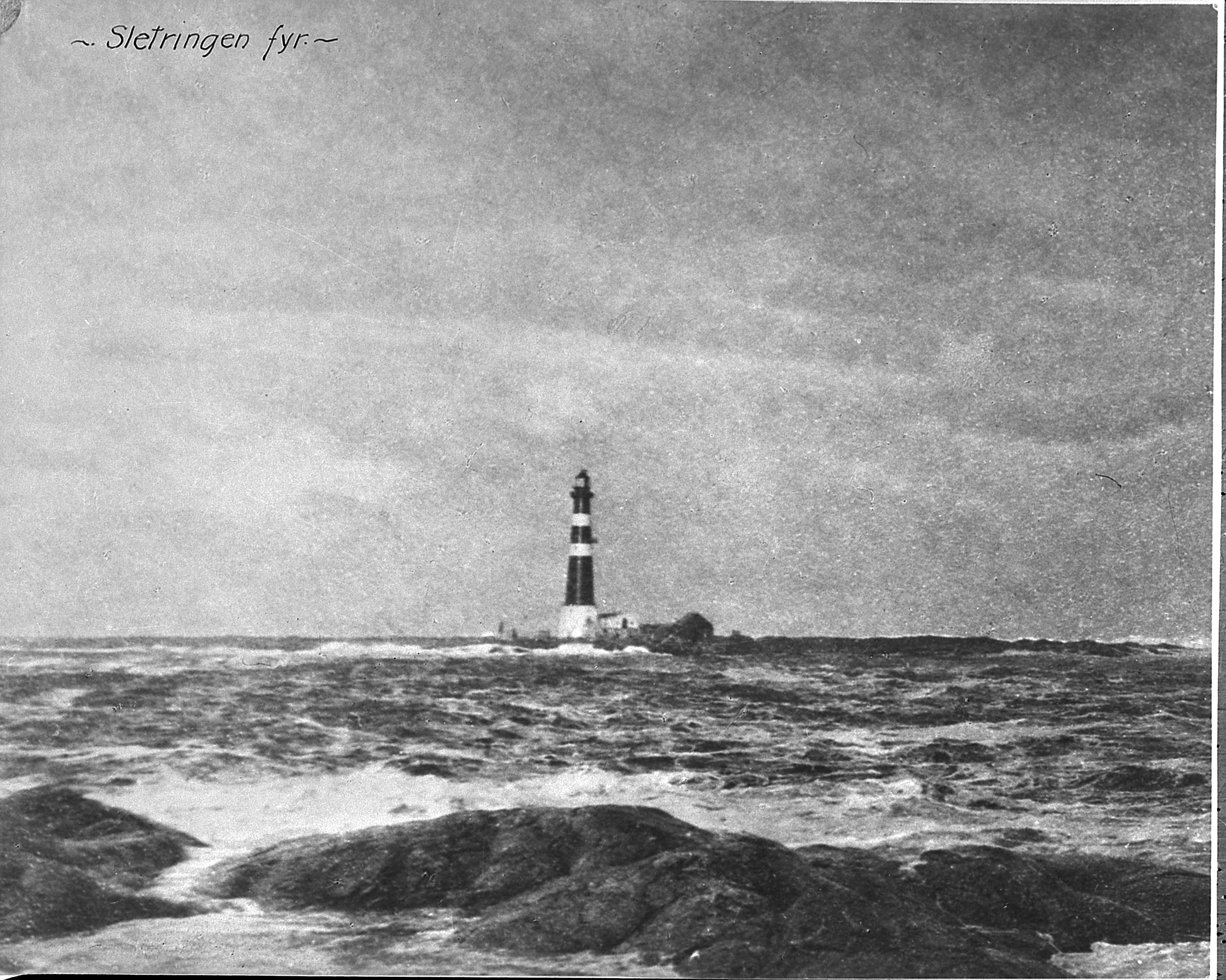

== See also ==
- List of lighthouses in Norway
- Lighthouses in Norway
