= Nordlandet Church =

- Nordlandet kirke
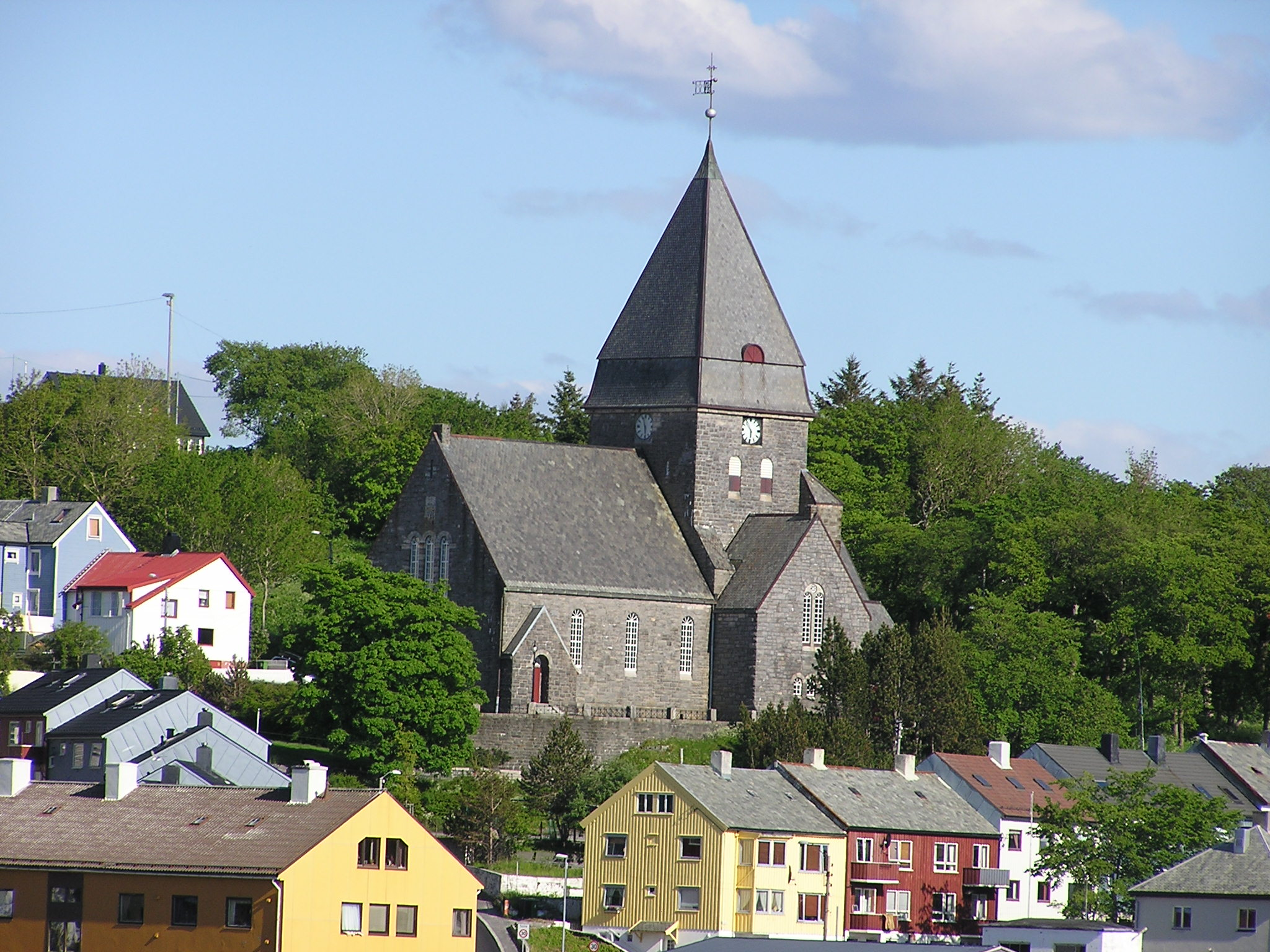
- View of the church
- Nordlandet Church
- 63°06′33″N 7°44′52″E
- Location: Kristiansund Municipality, Møre og Romsdal
- Country: Norway
- Denomination: Church of Norway
- Churchmanship: Evangelical Lutheran

History
- Status: Parish church
- Founded: 1914
- Consecrated: 13 Dec 1914

Architecture
- Functional status: Active
- Architect: H.M. Schytte-Berg
- Architectural type: Cruciform
- Completed: 1914 (112 years ago)

Specifications
- Capacity: 700
- Materials: Stone

Administration
- Diocese: Møre bispedømme
- Deanery: Ytre Nordmøre prosti
- Parish: Nordlandet
- Norwegian Cultural Heritage Site
- Type: Church
- Status: Listed
- ID: 85156

Nordlandet Church (Norwegian: Nordlandet kirke) is a parish church of the Church of Norway in Kristiansund Municipality in Møre og Romsdal county, Norway. It is located on the western end of the island of Nordlandet in the town of Kristiansund. It is the church for the Nordlandet parish which is part of the Ytre Nordmøre prosti (deanery) in the Diocese of Møre. The gray, stone church was built in a cruciform design in 1914 by the architect Hagbarth Martin Schytte-Berg. The church seats about 700 people.

== History ==
On 19 December 1872, the Christianssund City Council decided that the church parish should be divided and a new, larger church was to be erected on the island of Kirkelandet and the existing church building would be moved to the neighboring island of Nordlandet. Previously, the church had been known as Christianssund Church, but with two churches, they would get new names. The new church on Kirkelandet would be known as Kirkelandet Church and the old church that would be moved to Nordlandet would be known as Nordlandet Church. The new Kirkelandet Church was completed in 1878 on a site near the old church. Budget overruns and large municipal expenditures in general meant that the Nordlandet project was postponed, despite the fact that land was already purchased. The old church stood for a few years after the new Kirkelandet Church was completed. The old church was torn down in 1884 and plans to move it to Nordlandet were scrapped.

Years later, in 1914, the new Nordlandet Church was finally constructed. The stone cruciform church was based upon designs by the architect Hagbarth Martin Schytte-Berg (1860-1944). The new building was consecrated on 13 December 1914. The church has a large central tower above the nave. The church features murals by Emanuel Vigeland. The altarpiece dates from 1850 and was transferred from the old Kristiansund Church, which was demolished in 1884. It is one of the few churches in the area that were not harmed during World War II.

== See also ==
- List of churches in Møre
