= Venabygd Chapel =

Church in Innlandet, Norway

- Venabygd fjellkapell
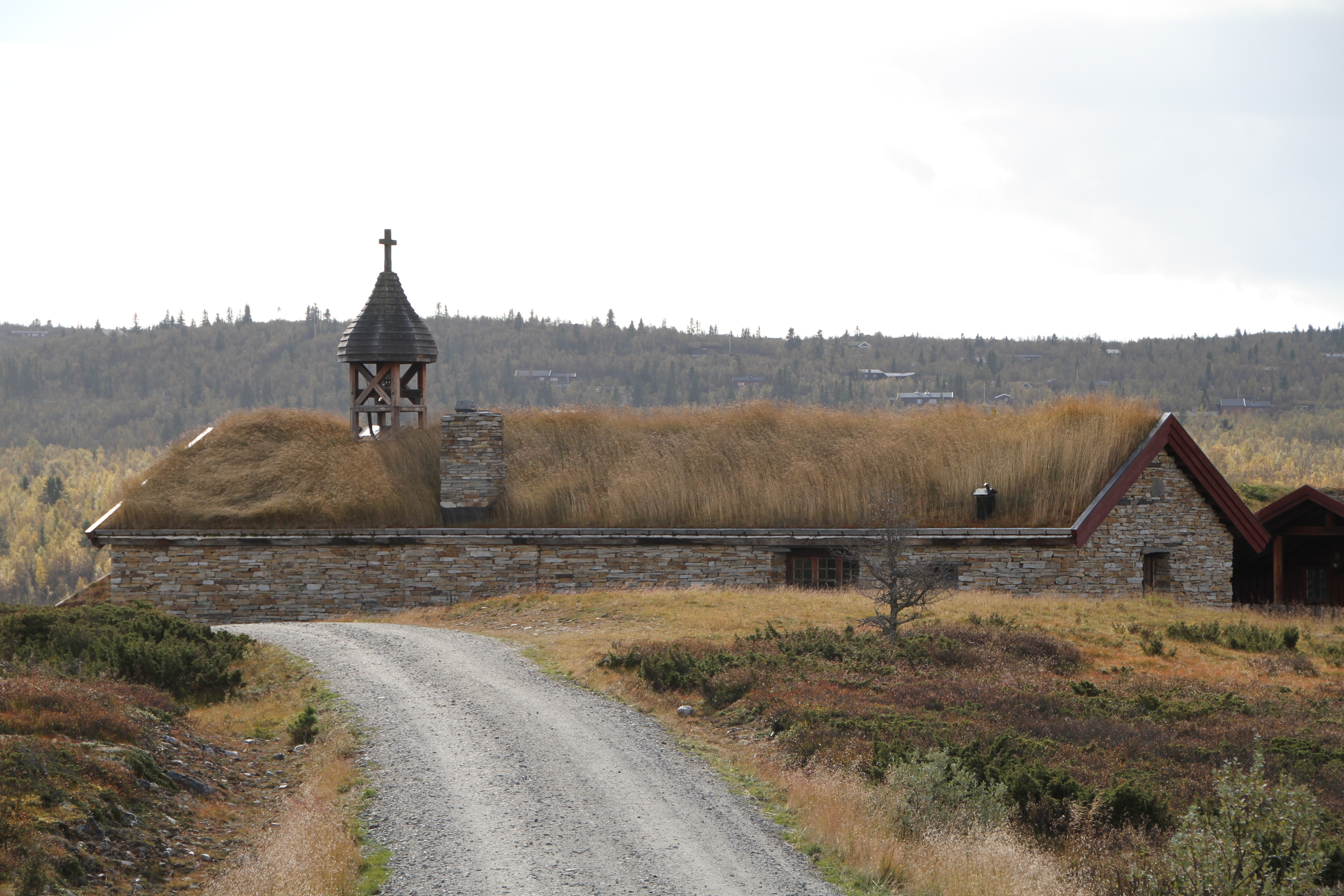
- View of the chapel
- Venabygd Chapel
- 61°38′49″N 10°05′55″E
- Location: Ringebu Municipality, Innlandet
- Country: Norway
- Denomination: Church of Norway
- Churchmanship: Evangelical Lutheran

History
- Status: Chapel
- Founded: 1979
- Consecrated: 15 July 1979

Architecture
- Functional status: Active
- Architect: Odd Østbye
- Architectural type: Long church
- Completed: 1979 (47 years ago)

Specifications
- Capacity: 50
- Materials: Wood

Administration
- Diocese: Hamar bispedømme
- Deanery: Sør-Gudbrandsdal prosti
- Parish: Venabygd
- Norwegian Cultural Heritage Site
- Type: Church
- Status: Not protected
- ID: 85296

Venabygd Chapel (Norwegian: Venabygd fjellkapell) is a parish church of the Church of Norway in Ringebu Municipality in Innlandet county, Norway. It is located in the village of Venabu. It is an annex chapel for the Venabygd parish which is part of the Sør-Gudbrandsdal prosti (deanery) in the Diocese of Hamar. The brown, wood church was built in a long church design in 1979 using plans drawn up by the architect Odd Østbye. The church seats about 50 people.

== History ==
The parish priest in Ringebu, Simon Dahlen, began the initiative to build a chapel in Venabu, and he put together a committee to help him with the project. Funds were raised from local residents and land owners as well as with business people. Planning began in the 1960s and carried on for about 20 years before the building was completed. The chapel was built on a voluntary basis. The chapel itself is a rectangular building with a turf roof and a small bell tower with an onion-shaped dome with a cross on top. The building was designed by Odd Østbye and the builder was Ole Dalbakk. The new building was consecrated by Bishop Georg Hille on 15 July 1979.

== See also ==
- List of churches in Hamar
