= Åssiden =

Borough of Drammen, Norway

Coordinates: 59°45′35.94″N 10°8′27.53″E

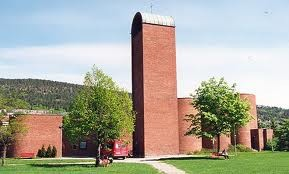
Åssiden Church

Åssiden is the largest borough of Drammen in Buskerud county, Norway.

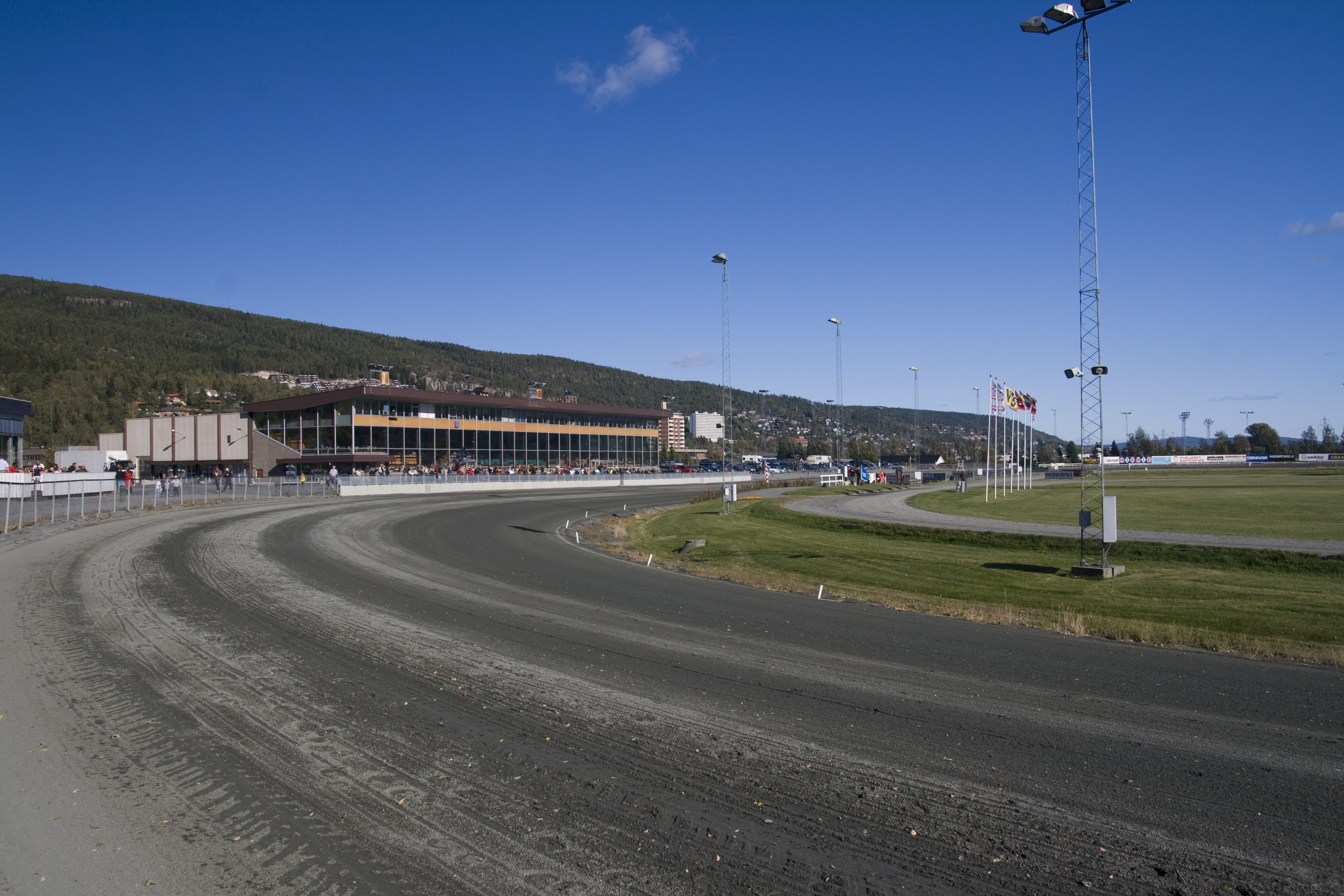
Drammen Racecourse

Åssiden was a part of Lier municipality until 1951, when it became part of Drammen municipality. Åssiden is located on the western side of Drammen, north of the Drammenselva. Historically Åssiden was the location through which lumber was transported via Drammenselva into the city. Åssiden Elvepark is a park which was built on old landfill sites by the Drammenselva.

Åssiden is the location of the vocational school, Åssiden Upper Secondary School (Åssiden videregående skole). Åssiden IF is a local sports club which has sections for association football and team handball. Drammen Racecourse (Drammen Travbane) is also located in Åssiden.

Åssiden Church (Åssiden Kirke) dates from 1967. It is designed by the architects Harald Hille and Odd Østbye. The building was built of brick and has 350 seats. It is part of the Drammen prosti in the Tunsberg diocese.

There are two alpine ski lifts off E 134 on the road to Mjøndalen. The site offers 100 km of cross-country ski tracks and 42 km of illuminated ski tracks in the hills above Åssiden. Kjøsterudjuvet is a wilderness ravine located only 10 minutes from downtown Drammen. The ravine is 1300 metres long and the stone walls are more than 60 metres high.

== Notable people from Åssiden ==
- Arne Dokken, Norwegian former football player and coach
- Ludvig G. Braathen (1891–1976), Norwegian entrepreneur
