= Kirkelandet Church =

Church in Møre og Romsdal, Norway

- Kirkelandet kirke
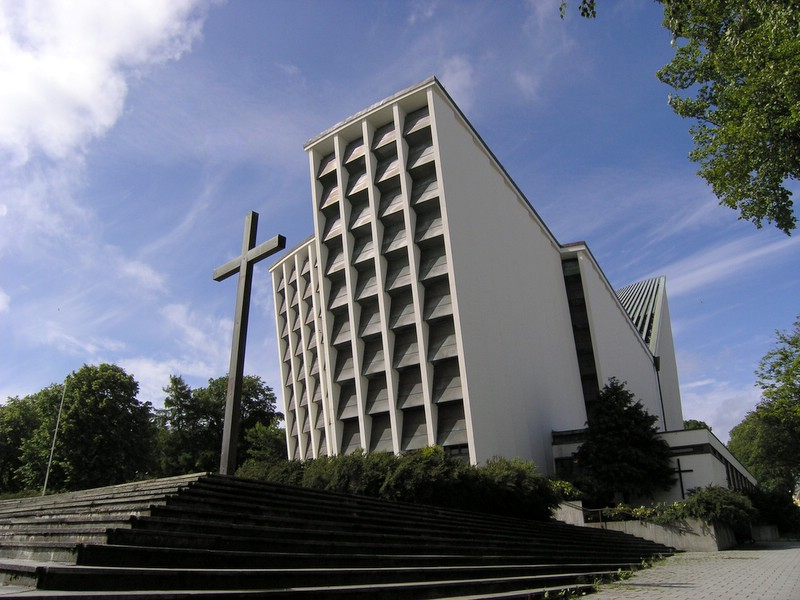
- View of the church
- Kirkelandet Church
- 63°06′52″N 7°43′33″E
- Location: Kristiansund Municipality, Møre og Romsdal
- Country: Norway
- Denomination: Church of Norway
- Churchmanship: Evangelical Lutheran
- Website: Official Website

History
- Former name: Christianssund kirke
- Status: Parish church
- Founded: 1709
- Consecrated: 24 May 1964

Architecture
- Functional status: Active
- Architect: Odd Østbye
- Architectural type: Rectangular
- Groundbreaking: 1961
- Completed: 1964 (62 years ago)

Specifications
- Capacity: 550
- Materials: Concrete

Administration
- Diocese: Møre bispedømme
- Deanery: Ytre Nordmøre prosti
- Parish: Kristiansund

Clergy
- Dean: Gerd Anne Aarset
- Pastor: Tormod Sikkeland
- Norwegian Cultural Heritage Site
- Type: Church
- Status: Listed
- ID: 84777

Kirkelandet Church (Norwegian: Kirkelandet Kirke) is a parish church of the Church of Norway in Kristiansund Municipality in Møre og Romsdal county, Norway. It is located on the island of Kirkelandet in the town of Kristiansund. It is the church for the Kristiansund parish which is part of the Ytre Nordmøre prosti (deanery) in the Diocese of Møre. The white, concrete church was built in a modern, rectangular style in 1964 by the architect Odd Østbye. The church seats about 550 people.

The church is also the seat of the Ytre Nordmøre prosti (deanery), and Gerd Anne Aarset is the Dean who is seated here. Tormod Sikkeland is the pastor of the congregation.

== Design ==
The church is reckoned as one of the most daring "modern" church buildings in Norway. The architect Odd Østbye created a building which breaks with all traditional church architecture. The architectonic idea behind the church is "Quartz in roses", meaning that the church is shining as a glowing quartz among the roses. It has 320 small windows in the church that are all shades of red or yellow.

The church was nominated as the representative from Møre og Romsdal county as the "Building of the Century 1905-2005" (Århundrets byggverk 1905–2005) for Norway.

== History ==
The first church in Kristiansund was built in 1709 on the island of Kirkelandet. The church was originally called Christianssund Church. The church site was originally located about 350 metres (1,150 ft) south of the present church site (just south of the present-day cemetery). This church only stood for 15 years before being struck by lightning and burning to the ground in 1724. In 1725, a new church was completed on the same site. This building had a cruciform design with an onion dome on top of the central tower.

In 1814, this church served as an election church (Norwegian: valgkirke). Together with more than 300 other parish churches across Norway, it was a polling station for elections to the 1814 Norwegian Constituent Assembly which wrote the Constitution of Norway. This was Norway's first national elections. Each church parish was a constituency that elected people called "electors" who later met together in each county to elect the representatives for the assembly that was to meet at Eidsvoll Manor later that year.

On 19 December 1872, the Christianssund City Council decided that the church parish should be divided and a new, larger church was to be erected on the island of Kirkelandet and the existing church building would be moved to the neighboring island of Nordlandet. Previously, the church had been known as Christianssund Church, but with two churches, they would get new names. The new church on Kirkelandet would be known as Kirkelandet Church and the old church that would be moved to Nordlandet would be known as Nordlandet Church. The new Kirkelandet Church was designed by Henrik Thrap-Meyer and it was built from 1875 to 1878 and it was consecrated on 18 September 1878. It was a neo-Gothic long church with 1,200 seats. It was built about 350 metres (1,150 ft) to the north on Lyhshaugen (a nearby hill named after merchant Lyhs). Budget overruns and large municipal expenditures in general meant that the Nordlandet project was postponed, despite the fact that land was purchased. The old church stood for six years after the new one was completed. In 1884, the old church was disassembled and its materials moved to the new site. Again, due to budgetary reasons, the new Nordlandet Church was not actually re-constructed until 1914.

During World War II, the Germans bombed the town of Kristiansund in late-April and early-May 1940 and many buildings were destroyed and burned including Kirkelandet Church. After the war was over, there was a lot of rebuilding all over Norway, and the Kirkelandet Church eventually was rebuilt in 1964, making this the fourth church building to stand on the island. Odd Østbye won an architectural competition for a new church in 1958 for a project called "Quartz in roses". The church was consecrated on 24 May 1964.

== Media gallery ==
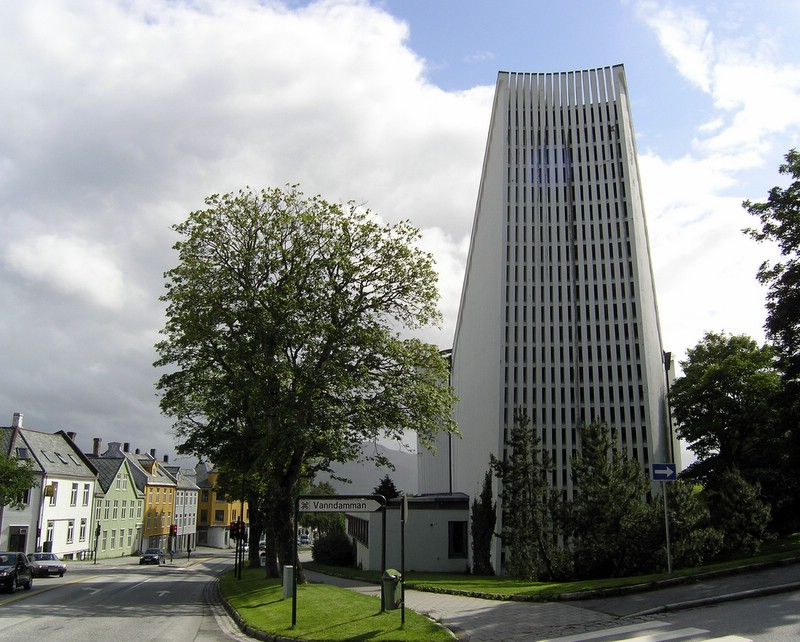
Exterior back

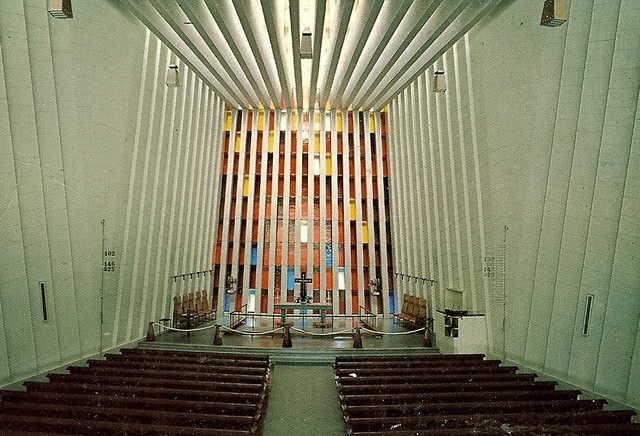
Interior front

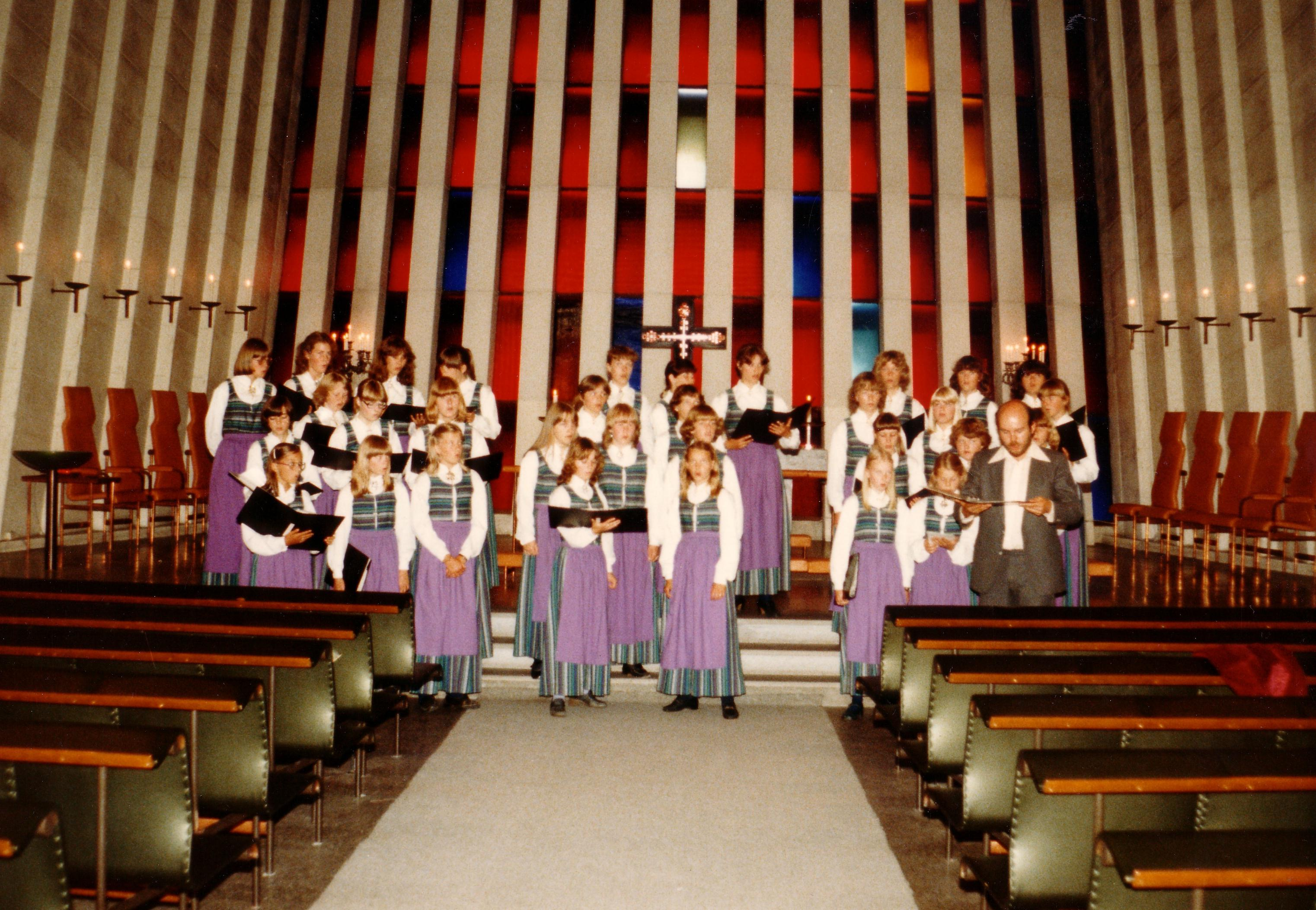
Interior

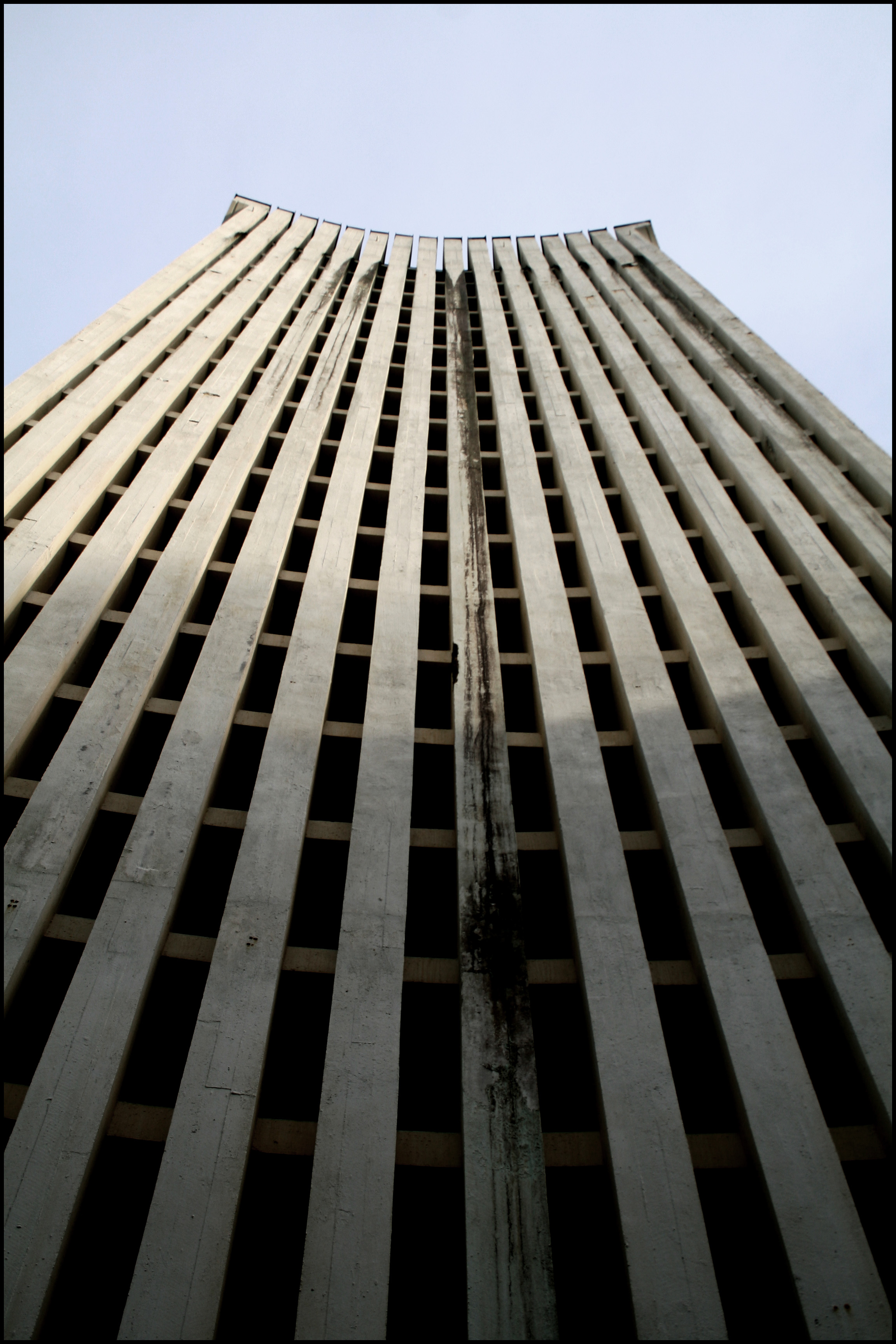
Close up of the exterior

== See also ==
- List of churches in Møre
