= Titran Chapel =

Church in Trøndelag, Norway

- Titran kapell
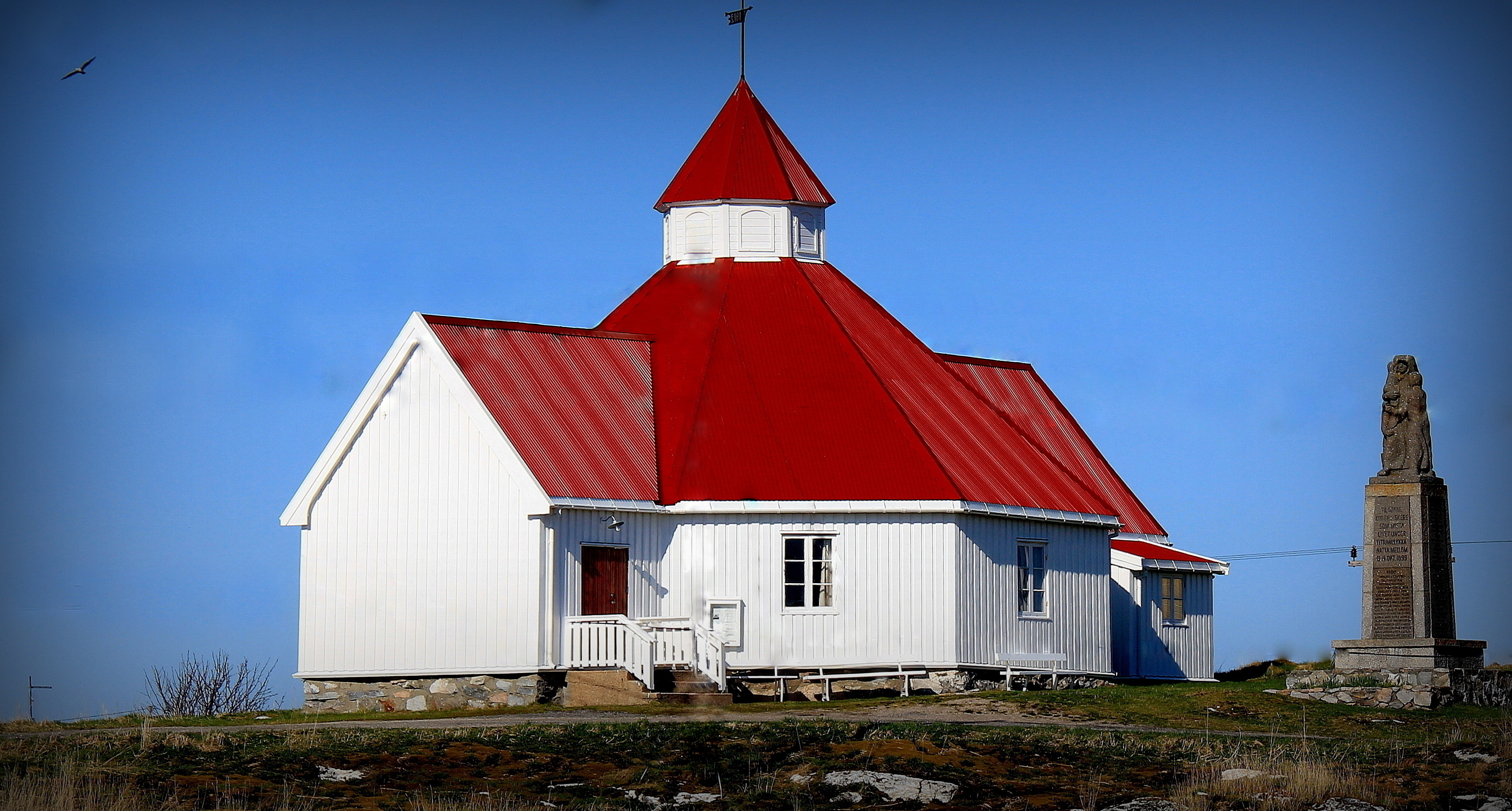
- View of the church
- Titran Chapel
- 63.669378429°N 08.3087579905°E
- Location: Frøya Municipality, Trøndelag
- Country: Norway
- Denomination: Church of Norway
- Churchmanship: Evangelical Lutheran

History
- Status: Parish church
- Founded: 15th century
- Consecrated: 4 December 1912

Architecture
- Functional status: Active
- Architectural type: Octagonal
- Completed: 1873 (153 years ago)

Specifications
- Capacity: 200
- Materials: Wood

Administration
- Diocese: Nidaros bispedømme
- Deanery: Orkdal prosti
- Parish: Frøya
- Norwegian Cultural Heritage Site
- Type: Church
- Status: Automatically protected
- ID: 85628

Titran Chapel (Norwegian: Titran kapell) is a parish church of the Church of Norway in Frøya Municipality in Trøndelag county, Norway. It is located in the village of Titran on the western tip of the island of Frøya. It is one of several churches for the Frøya parish which is part of the Orkdal prosti (deanery) in the Diocese of Nidaros. The white, wooden church was built in an octagonal design in 1873 by the builder Petter Snekker. The church seats about 200 people.

== History ==
The earliest existing historical records of the church date back to the year 1589, but the church was not new that year. The church was likely established around the year 1433. The church was in regular use until 1762, with a last service being held on 22 January 1774, but by then the church was in such poor condition that the service was held outside. The population of Titran had dropped due to changes in the local fishing situation, so the church was closed and parishioners had to travel to Dolm Church, about 20 kilometres (12 mi) away by boat. By 1780, only the walls remained as the roof had already fallen in. The church was then torn down, but the cemetery continued to be used until 1930.

About 100 years later, there was a push for a new chapel in Titran. In 1873, a new octagonal prayer house was built by Petter Snekker about 140 metres (460 ft) west of the historic church site. In 1912, a choir was added to the west and a church porch with a priest's sacristy and a baptismal waiting room in the east. The building was consecrated as a chapel on 4 December 1912.

== Media gallery ==
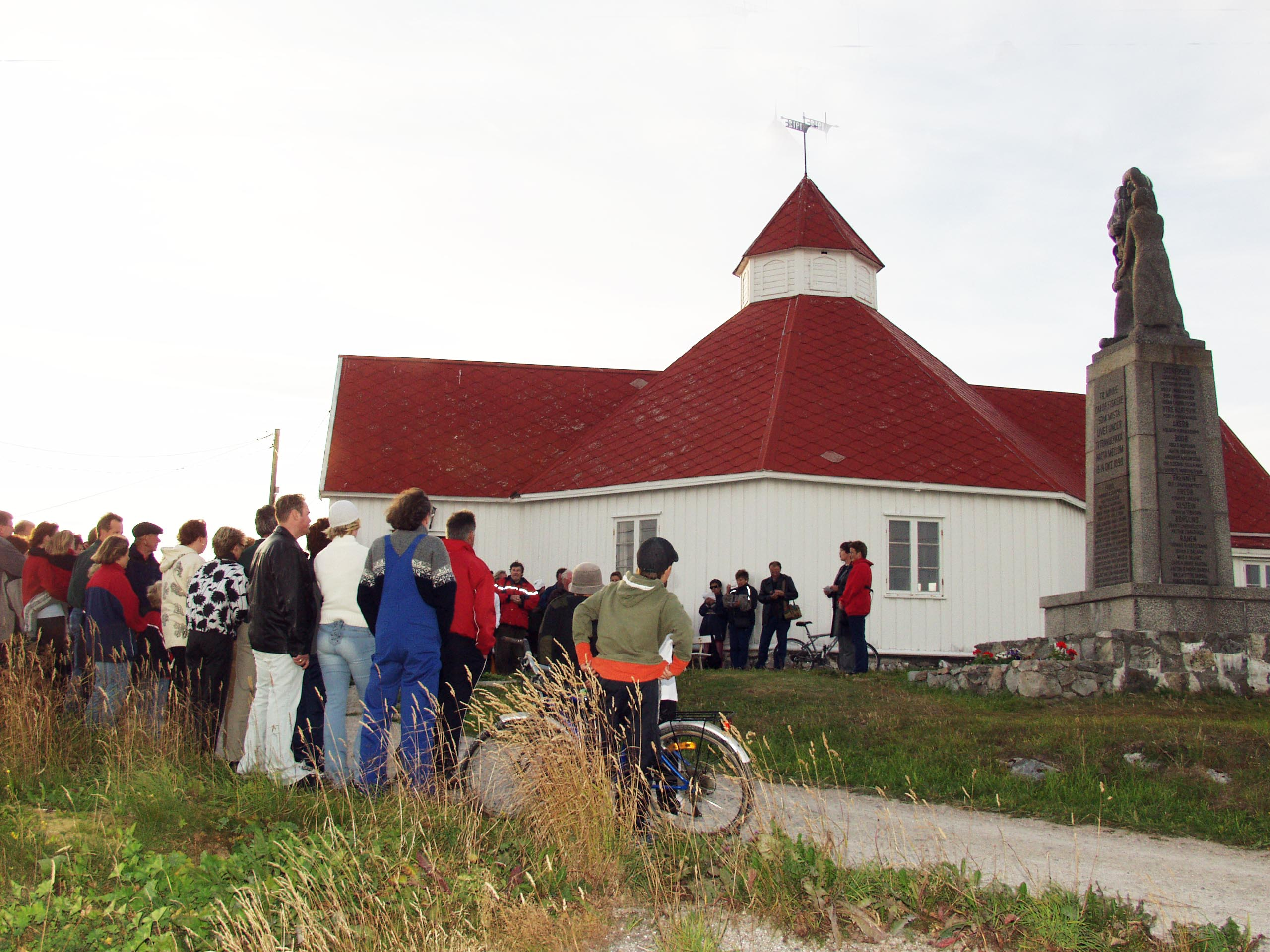

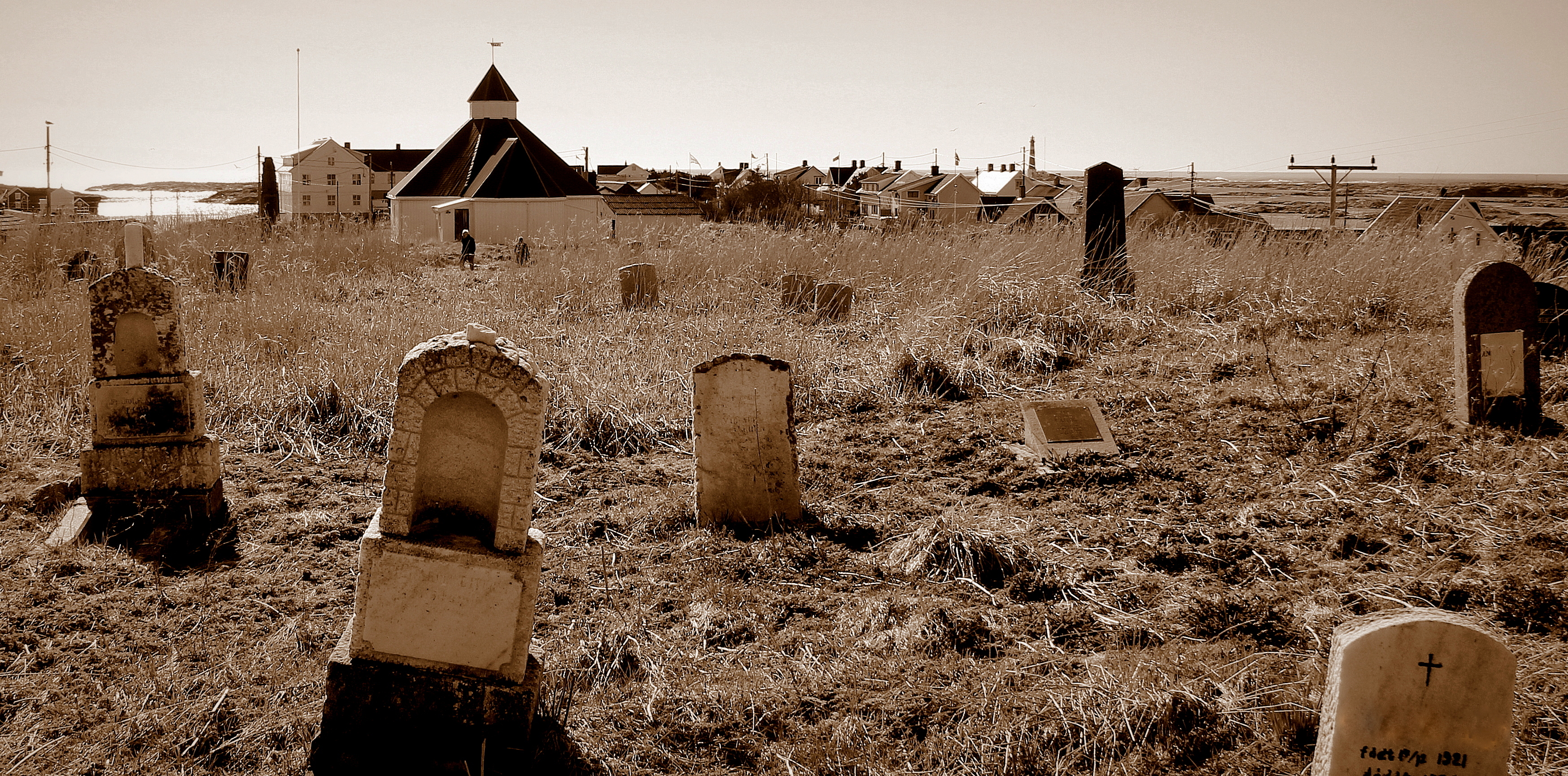

== See also ==
- List of churches in Nidaros
