= Titran =

Village in Frøya Municipality, Norway

- Village
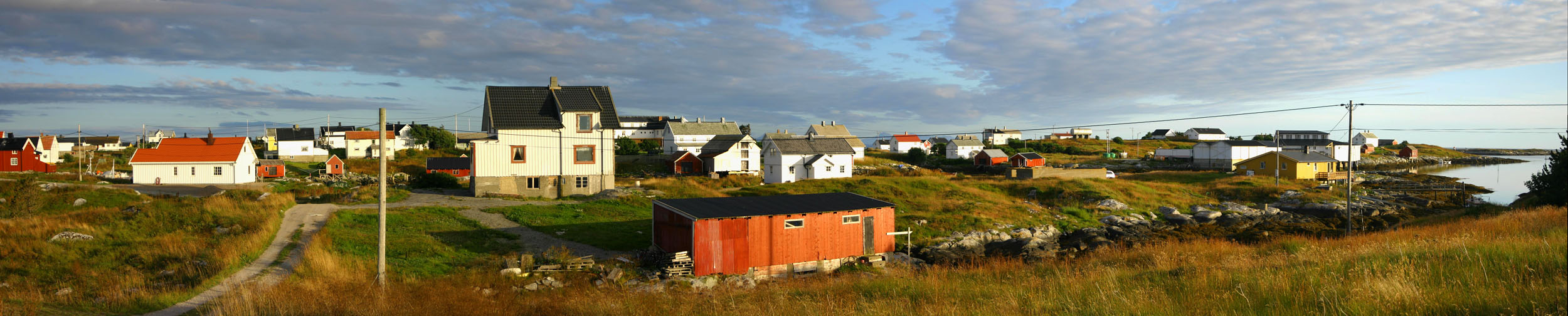
- View of the village
- Interactive map of Titran
- Location within Trøndelag Location within Norway
- Coordinates: 63.6678°N 08.3064°E
- Country: Norway
- Region: Central Norway
- County: Trøndelag
- District: Fosen
- Municipality: Frøya Municipality
- Elevation: 4 m (13 ft)
- Time zone: UTC+01:00 (CET)
  - Summer (DST): UTC+02:00 (CEST)
- Post Code: 7268 Titran

Titran is a village in Frøya Municipality in Trøndelag county, Norway. It is located at the western end of the island of Frøya, about 30 kilometres (19 mi) west of the villages of Hammarvika and Sistranda. The Sletringen Lighthouse is located on a small islet off the coast of Titran. The village is centered on fishing and fish farming and in 2017, there were 105 residents. Titran Chapel is located in the village.

Titran is also known for its windmill energy production. It is the site of the first wind energy production in Norway. Two windmills were built near the village in 1986. The tallest windmill is 32 metres (105 ft) high and can produce 4 MW (5,400 hp).

Hallvar Witzø's film Everybody hates Johan (2022) is set in Titran.
