= Odd Østbye =

Norwegian architect and professor

Odd Kjeld Østbye
- Born: 14 April 1925; Vestre Aker, Norway
- Died: 4 January 2009 (aged 83); Bærum, Norway
- Occupation: Architect
- Spouse: Kirsten Vahl
- Parent(s): Sigurd Østbye and Borghild Elisabeth Berggreen

Odd Kjeld Østbye (1925–2009) was a Norwegian architect, professor at the Oslo School of Architecture and Design (1988-1993), and rector of the same school from 1990 to 1993.

After graduating with his examen artium degree in 1944, Østbye studied construction at the Norwegian National Academy of Craft and Art Industry until 1948, in preparation for a getting his degree at the Oslo School of Architecture and Design. From 1949 to 1952, he worked for the Oslo city architect's office. In 1961, Østbye began his own architectural business. Østbye received the King's Medal of Merit in 2004.

Among the works he has carried out are Grorud fire station, Snarøya Church, Kirkelandet Church, Karasjok Church, Åssiden Church, Venabygd Chapel, and Sletta Church.
