= Oskar Steinvik =

Norwegian politician

Oskar Steinvik (10 April 1908 – 24 August 1975) was a Norwegian politician for the Labour Party.

He served as a deputy representative in the Norwegian Parliament from Sør-Trøndelag during the term 1958–1961.

On the local level Steinvik was mayor of Frøya Municipality from 1968 to his death in 1975.
