= Sletta Church (Frøya) =

Church in Trøndelag, Norway

- Sletta kirke
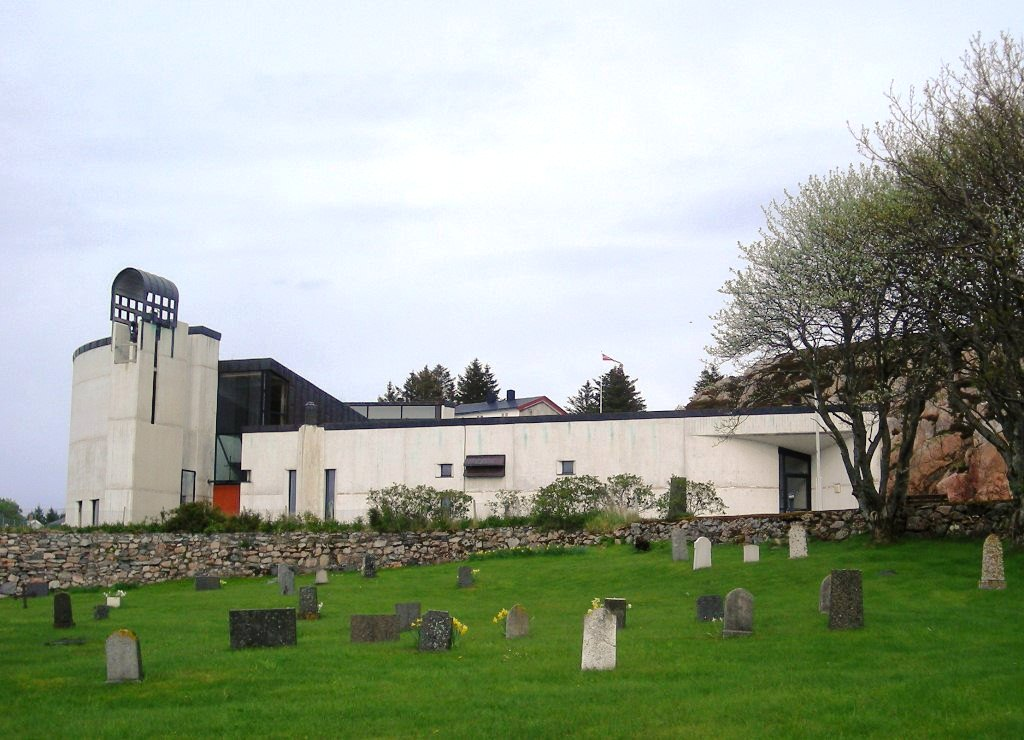
- View of the church
- Sletta Church
- 63.795775631°N 08.808122277°E
- Location: Frøya Municipality, Trøndelag
- Country: Norway
- Denomination: Church of Norway
- Churchmanship: Evangelical Lutheran

History
- Former name: Nord-Frøya kirke
- Status: Parish church
- Founded: 1755
- Consecrated: 21 Oct 1990

Architecture
- Functional status: Active
- Architect: Odd Østbye
- Architectural type: Circular
- Style: Modern
- Completed: 1990 (36 years ago)

Specifications
- Capacity: 430
- Materials: Wood

Administration
- Diocese: Nidaros bispedømme
- Deanery: Orkdal prosti
- Parish: Frøya
- Norwegian Cultural Heritage Site
- Type: Church
- Status: Automatically protected
- ID: 85153

Sletta Church (Norwegian: Sletta kirke) is a parish church of the Church of Norway in Frøya Municipality in Trøndelag county, Norway. It is located to the northeastern shore of the island of Frøya, about 8 kilometres (5.0 mi) north of the municipal center of Sistranda. It is one of several churches for the Frøya parish which is part of the Orkdal prosti (deanery) in the Diocese of Nidaros. The white, concrete church was built in a modern, circular design in 1990 using plans drawn up by the architect Odd Østbye. The church seats about 430 people.

== History ==
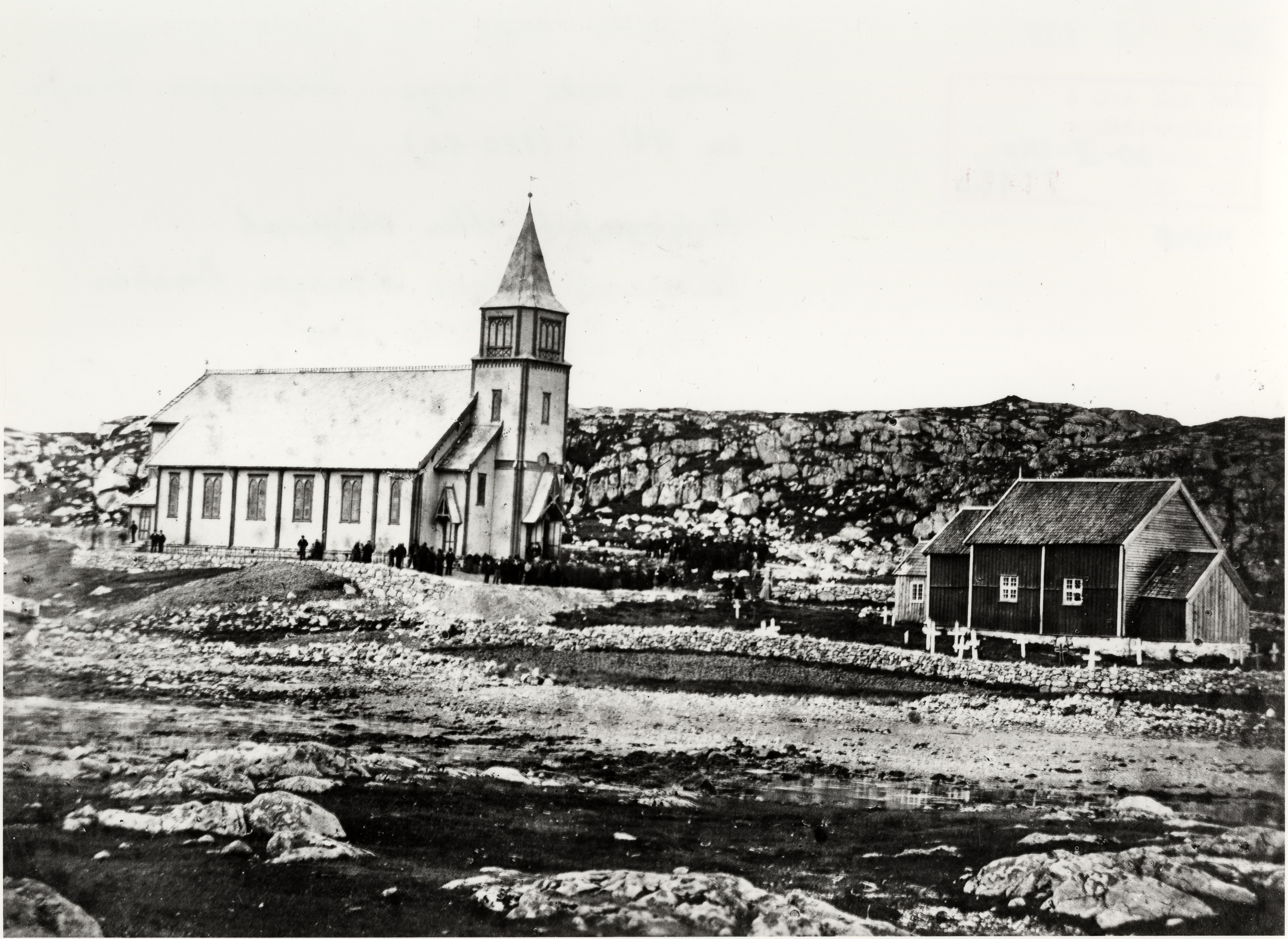
First church from 1755 (left) and second church from 1880 (left) at Sletta

Historically, the people of northern Frøya attended church at Sula Chapel, on a small island to the northwest of the present church site. In 1755, the old Sula Chapel was closed and moved from the island of Sula to Sletta on the island of Frøya where it was rebuilt to be the main church for the parish. Upon completion of the new church, Bishop Frederik Nannestad consecrated the building on 4 September 1755.

Eventually, that little wooden church became too small for the parish, so a new church was built just next to the old church in 1880. The new church was one of Norway's largest wooden churches, seating about 1,000 people. The last worship service in the old church was held on 26 September 1880, and then the new church was consecrated on 30 September 1880 by Bishop Andreas Grimelund. For a time, the two churches stood side by side before the old one was taken down and sold. On 8 June 1984, the large wooden church building burned to the ground in a big fire. It was said that the whole building was gone in about one hour.

After the fire, the old site was cleared and plans for a new church were made. Both the type of church building and location of the church were debated amongst the members of the parish. It was eventually decided to build the new church about 75 metres (246 ft) to the east of the old church site and that it would be a more modern design rather than a traditional style Norwegian wooden church. Construction on the new building began in 1988, and it was completed in 1990. On 21 October 1990, the Bishop of Nidaros, Kristen Kyrre Bremer, consecrated the new church. The new building has a modern-style sanctuary seating 430, and a beautiful small side chapel for meditation and quiet prayer.

The new mechanical action pipe organ was constructed in 1990 - by organ builder Gunnar Fabricius Husted from Fredensborg, Denmark - in a large case of Philippine mahogany, with 20 speaking stops, with the following specification:
Main work: Principal 8; Gedackt 8; Octave 4; Recorder 4; Quintet 2 2/3; Octave 2; Mixture IV; Trumpet 8
Svellverk: Reed flute 8; Principal 4; Traverse flute 4; Fifth 2 2/3; French flute 2; Third 1 3/5; Oboe 8; Tremulant
Pedal: Subbas 16; Principal 8 (from Manual I); Gedackt 8; Koralbas 4; Fagot 16
Three small hitchdown pedals on the right side of the console (above the pedalboard) control the three couplers for II/I, I/Pedal and II/Pedal.

There is a separate church hall with a kitchen, and there are a number of classrooms in the basement.

== See also ==
- List of churches in Nidaros
