= Finnvær Lighthouse =

Coastal lighthouse in Trøndelag, Norway

Finnvær Lighthouse Finnvær fyrstasjon
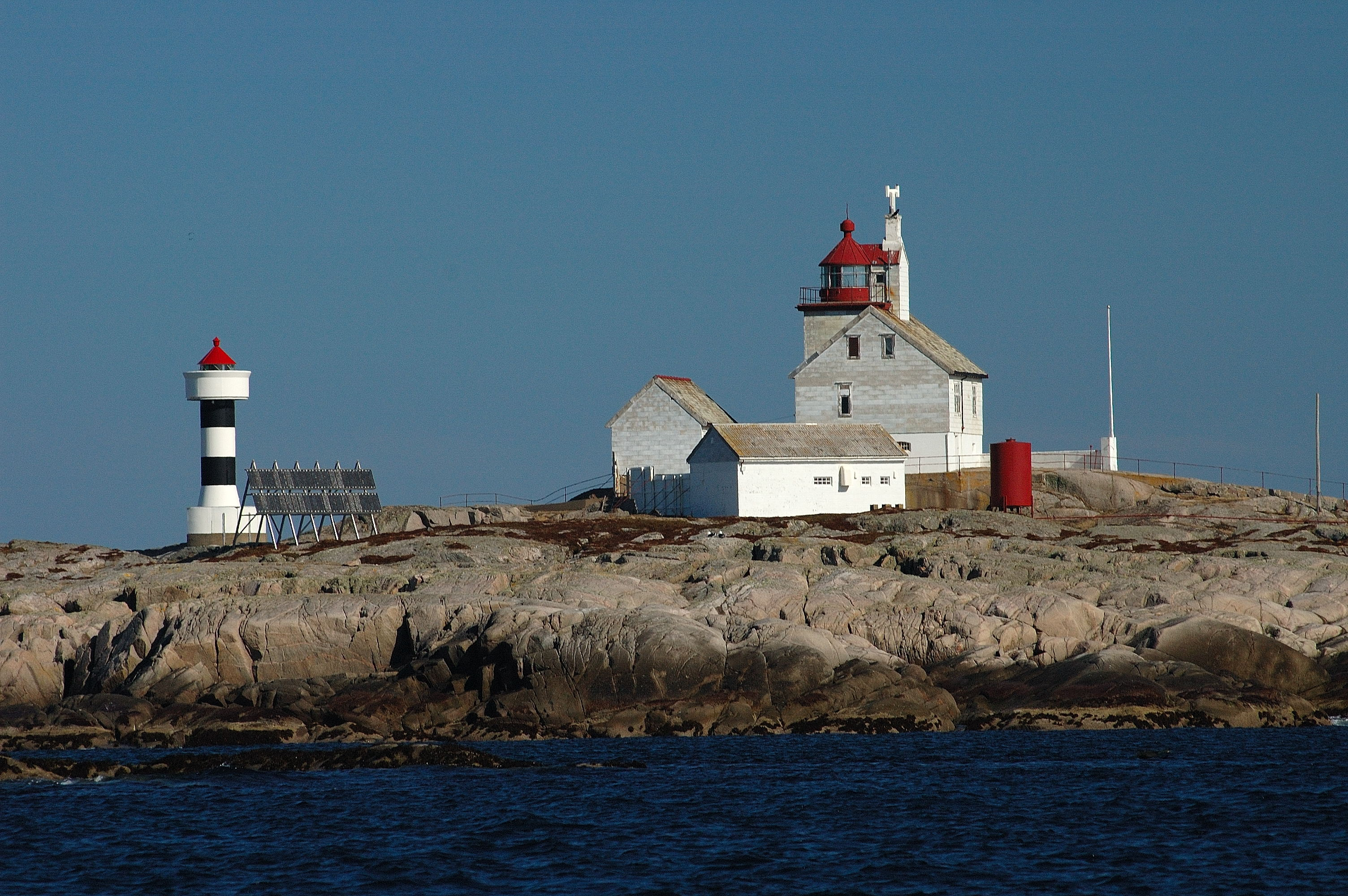
- View of the lighthouse
- Location: Froan, Trøndelag, Norway
- Coordinates: 64.0692°N 09.1105°E

Tower
- Constructed: 1912 (first)
- Construction: Concrete
- Automated: 1985
- Height: 10.2 metres (33 ft)
- Shape: Cylindrical
- Markings: White with 2 black bands and red roof

Light
- First lit: 1985 (current)
- Focal height: 18.4 metres (60 ft)
- Range: Red: 7.5 nmi (13.9 km; 8.6 mi) Green: 7.1 nmi (13.1 km; 8.2 mi) White: 9.8 nmi (18.1 km; 11.3 mi)
- Characteristic: Iso WRG 4s
- Norway no.: 471000

Finnvær Lighthouse (Norwegian: Finnvær fyr) is a coastal lighthouse in Frøya Municipality in Trøndelag county, Norway. The lighthouse is located at Finnværet on the small island of Valøya in the Froan islands. The lighthouse is located about 40 kilometres (25 mi) northeast of the Sula Lighthouse which is at Sula, about 25 kilometres (16 mi) northeast of Vingleia Lighthouse, and about 18 kilometres (11 mi) southwest of the Halten Lighthouse at Halten. The lighthouse was originally built in 1912 but in 1985 it was closed and a new automated tower was built right next to it.

== Current tower ==
The 10.2-metre (33 ft) tall concrete, cylindrical tower is painted white with two black horizontal stripes around it. The roof is painted red. On top of the tower, at an elevation of 18.4 metres (60 ft) above sea level is the light. The isophase light is on for four seconds and then off for four seconds emitting a white, red or green light (depending on direction). The light can be seen for up to 9.8 nautical miles (18.1 km; 11.3 mi). The tower is powered by solar power.

== Old tower ==
The original lighthouse was built in 1912. The 15-metre (49 ft) tall tower was a square, wooden tower that was white with a red roof. It was attached to a 2 1/2-story lighthouse keeper's house. The old tower was closed in 1985 when the new automated tower was completed.

== See also ==
- List of lighthouses in Norway
- Lighthouses in Norway
