= Sula Lighthouse =

Coastal lighthouse in Norway

Sula Lighthouse Sula fyrstasjon
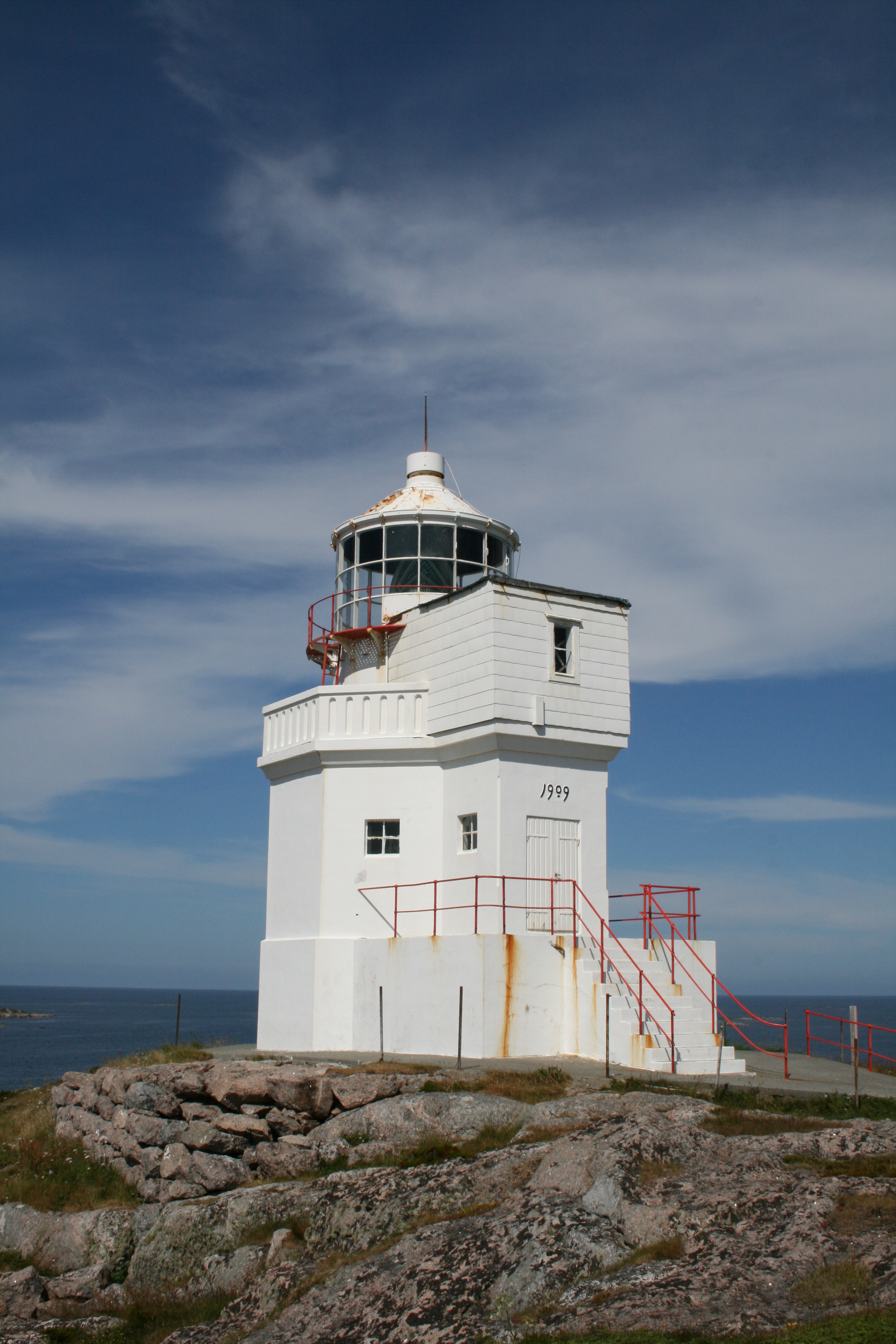
- View of the lighthouse
- Location: Trøndelag, Norway
- Coordinates: 63.8475°N 08.4530°E

Tower
- Constructed: 1793 (first)
- Construction: Concrete
- Automated: 1974
- Height: 13 metres (43 ft)
- Shape: Octagonal
- Markings: White
- Heritage: cultural property

Light
- First lit: 1909 (current)
- Focal height: 45 metres (148 ft)
- Lens: second order Fresnel lens
- Intensity: 3,378,000 candela
- Range: 18 nmi (33 km; 21 mi)
- Characteristic: Fl(3) W 30s
- Norway no.: 465000

Sula Lighthouse (Norwegian: Sula fyr) is a coastal lighthouse in Frøya Municipality in Trøndelag county, Norway. The lighthouse is located on the island of Sula. The lighthouse was originally built here in 1793 and another in 1804. The current tower was built in 1909. It is part of a series of lighthouses along the Froan islands in Frøya including the Finnvær Lighthouse, Vingleia Lighthouse, and Halten Lighthouse. It is lit from July 21 until May 16 each year. It is not lit during the summer due to the midnight sun of the region.

== History ==
The first light at Sula was built in 1793. The present lighthouse was completed in 1909 and it was automated in 1974. The 13-metre (43 ft) tall octagonal concrete tower is painted white. The light sits at an elevation of 45 metres (148 ft) above sea level. The white light flashes three times every 30 seconds. The 3,378,000-candela light can be seen for up to 18 nautical miles (33 km; 21 mi). A 2nd order Fresnel lens is used for the light.

== See also ==
- List of lighthouses in Norway
- Lighthouses in Norway
