= Sauøya =

Island in Trøndelag, Norway

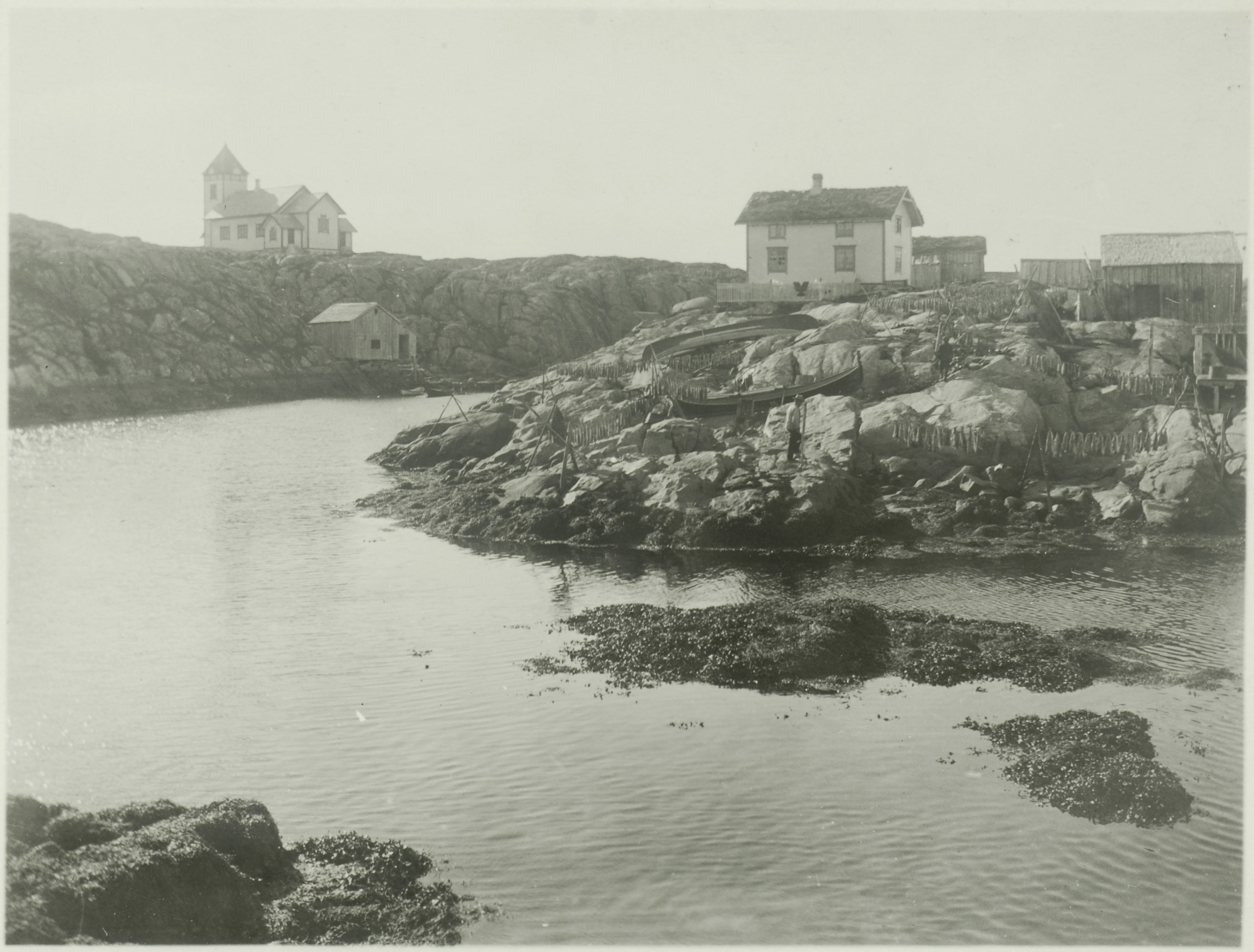
- Froan Chapel in Sauøya
- Interactive map of Sauøya

Geography
- Location: Trøndelag, Norway
- Coordinates: 64.00154°N 9.16549°E
- Archipelago: Froan

Administration
- Norway
- County: Trøndelag
- Municipality: Frøya Municipality

Sauøya is a small island located in Froan archipelago in Frøya Municipality in Trøndelag county, Norway. The island has not had a permanent settlement since Tommy Rodahl moved from the island in 2010. Froan Chapel was built on the island in 1904.

Farming is carried out in the area. Sauøya has some pasture and cultivated land and historically sheep were kept on the island. There is a significant influx of people to the island during the summer months. Most of the old homes on the island are now used as holiday cottages. There is no regular ferry connection to Sauøya in the winter, but there are up to several trips a week scheduled each summer.

== See also ==
- List of islands of Norway
