= Vingleia Lighthouse =

Coastal lighthouse in Trøndelag, Norway

Vingleia Lighthouse Vingleia fyrstasjon
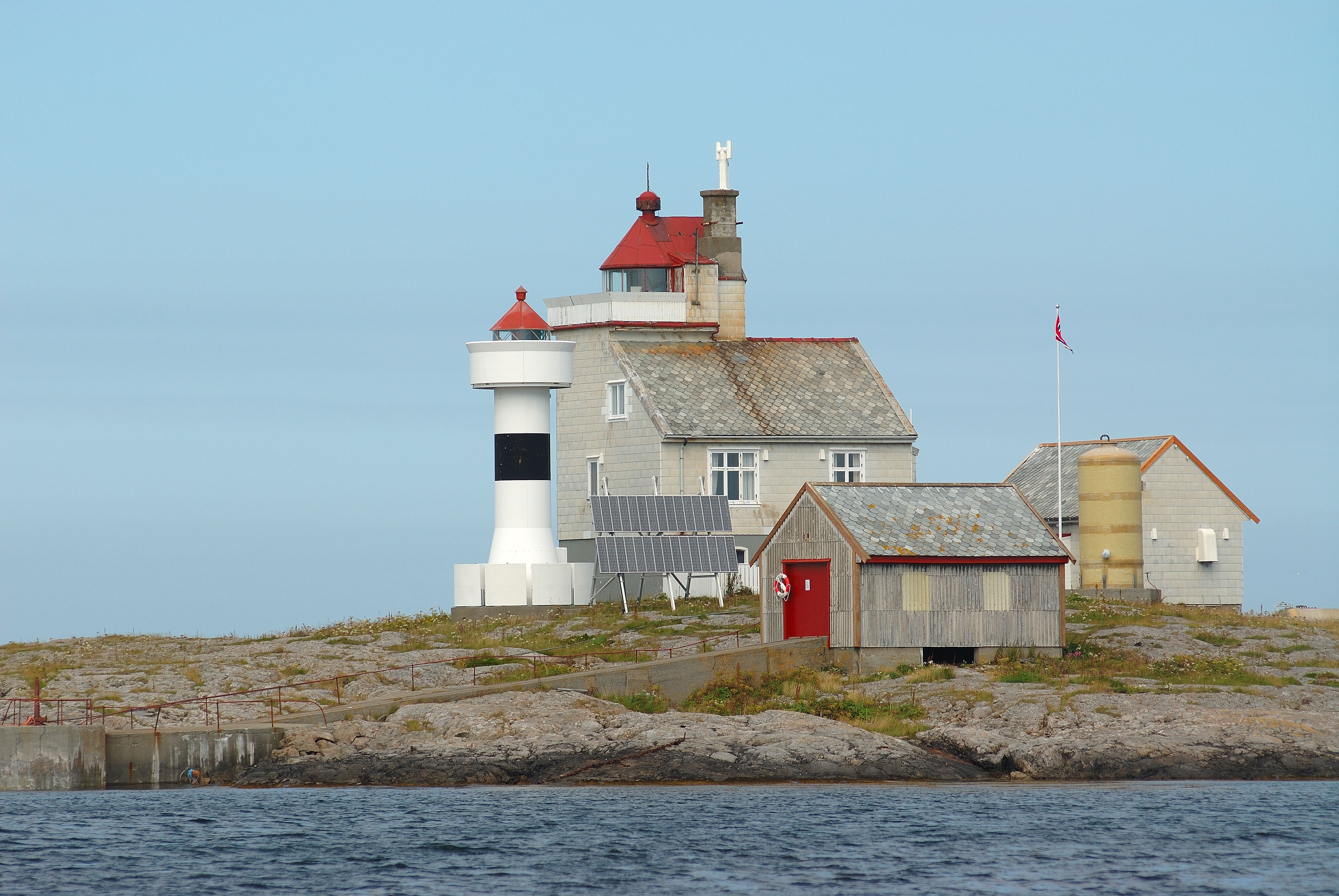
- View of the lighthouse
- Location: Skarvfleshølen, Trøndelag, Norway
- Coordinates: 63.9164°N 08.6744°E

Tower
- Constructed: 1921 (first)
- Construction: Concrete
- Automated: 1985
- Height: 10.2 metres (33 ft)
- Shape: Cylindrical
- Markings: White with black band and red roof

Light
- First lit: 1985 (current)
- Deactivated: 1985 (first)
- Focal height: 13.8 metres (45 ft)
- Intensity: 29,700 candela
- Range: Red: 7.73 nmi (14.32 km; 8.90 mi) Green: 7.32 nmi (13.56 km; 8.42 mi) White: 10.09 nmi (18.69 km; 11.61 mi)
- Characteristic: Oc (2) WRG 8s
- Norway no.: 467300

Vingleia Lighthouse (Norwegian: Vingleia fyr) is a coastal lighthouse in Frøya Municipality in Trøndelag county, Norway. The lighthouse sits on the island of Skarvfleshølen about 6 kilometres (3.7 mi) north of the island village of Mausund, about 13 kilometres (8.1 mi) northeast of the Sula Lighthouse, about 26 kilometres (16 mi) southwest of the Finnvær Lighthouse, and about 45 kilometres (28 mi) southwest of the Halten Lighthouse. It is lit from 21 July until 16 May each year. It is not lit during the summer due to the midnight sun of the region.

== Current tower ==
The lighthouse was built in 1985 to replace the previous tower that was built in 1921. The 10.2-metre (33 ft) tall tower is painted white with a black horizontal stripe and a red roof. The light sits at an elevation of 13.8 metres (45 ft) above sea level. The tower emits a white, red, or green light (depending on direction), occulting twice every 8 seconds. The 29,700-candela light can be seen for up to 10.09 nautical miles (18.69 km; 11.61 mi).

== Old tower ==
The original tower was built in 1921. It was a 19-metre (62 ft) tall square, wooden tower that was attached to the lighthouse keeper's house. It was painted white with a red roof. It was closed in 1985 when the new tower was built next to it. The old tower was renovated and is now available to rent as a vacation home.

== See also ==
- List of lighthouses in Norway
- Lighthouses in Norway
