= Halten Lighthouse =

Coastal lighthouse in Trøndelag, Norway

Halten Lighthouse Halten fyrstasjon
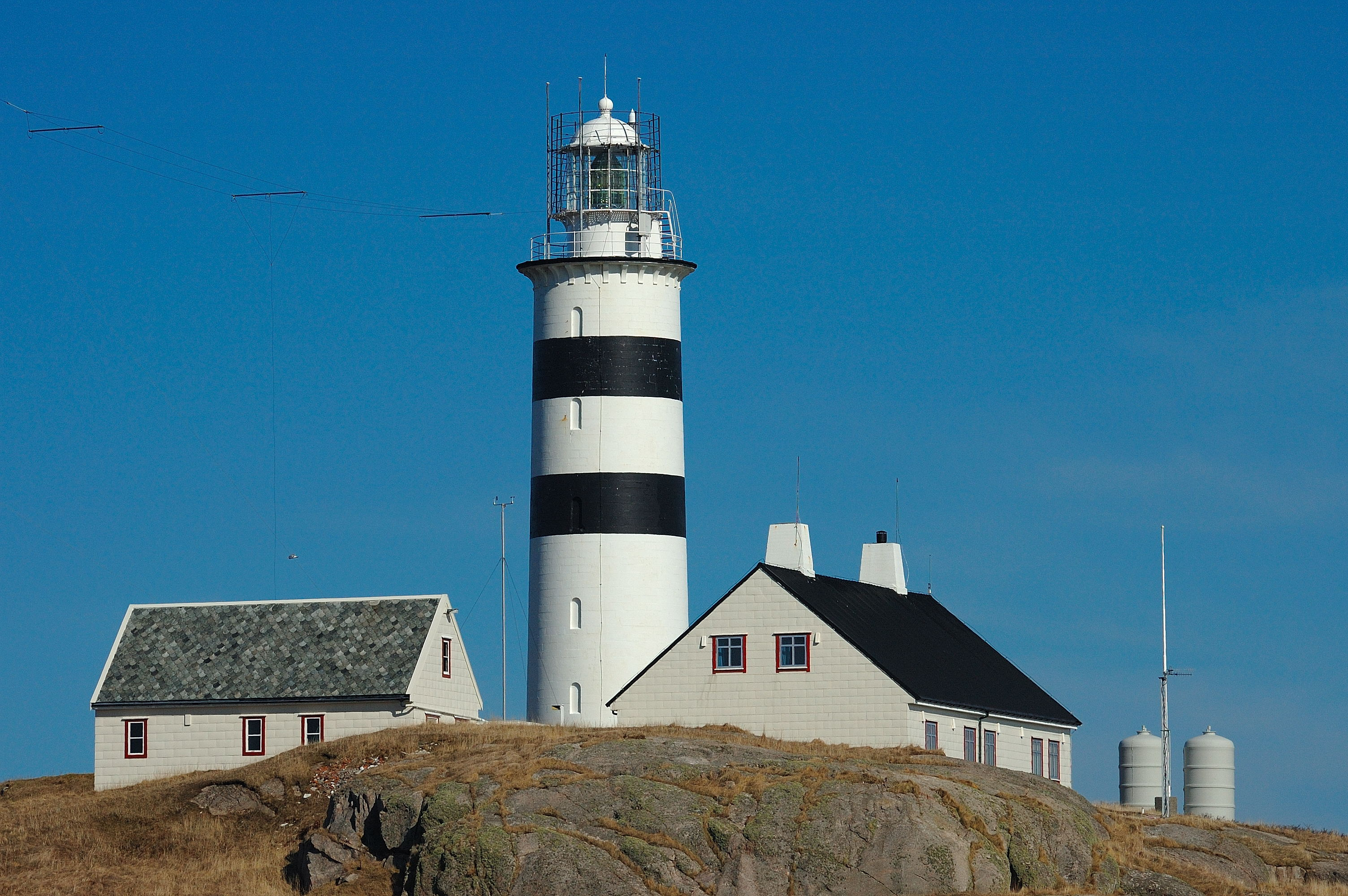
- View of the lighthouse
- Location: Halten, Trøndelag, Norway
- Coordinates: 64.1729°N 09.4054°E

Tower
- Constructed: 1875
- Construction: Stone
- Automated: 2005
- Height: 29.5 metres (97 ft)
- Shape: Cylindrical
- Markings: White with 2 black bands
- Heritage: cultural property
- Racon: T (—)

Light
- Focal height: 39 metres (128 ft)
- Intensity: 1,080,000 candela
- Range: 17.5 nmi (32.4 km; 20.1 mi)
- Characteristic: Fl W 4s
- Norway no.: 471800

Halten Lighthouse (Norwegian: Halten fyr) is a coastal lighthouse in Frøya Municipality in Trøndelag county, Norway. The lighthouse is situated in the now uninhabited fishing village of Halten. It was first lit in 1875, and it is the northernmost of the chain of lighthouses marking the string of islands called Froan north of Frøya. The lighthouses include Sula Lighthouse in south, Vingleia Lighthouse, Finnvær Lighthouse, and finally Halten Lighthouse. The lighthouse emits the morse code letter "T" (—) as a racon signal.

The 29.5-metre (97 ft) tall stone lighthouse tower is painted white and it has two black horizontal stripes. The light sits at an elevation of 39 metres (128 ft). The light emits a white flash of light every four seconds. It has a luminous intensity of 1,080,000 candela and a visibility of up to 17.5 nautical miles (32.4 km; 20.1 mi).

The lighthouse tower was originally planned to build a twin-tower lighthouse with the Lista Lighthouse, but the technical development of lighthouses made this unnecessary so it was dismantled and rebuilt here. A lot of the original interior and exterior are preserved on the lighthouse and the station has been declared a historic preservation site. The station is still in use by the Norwegian Coastal Administration as a base station.

== Climate ==
Climate data for Halten Lighthouse 1991-2020 (16 m)
Month	Jan	Feb	Mar	Apr	May	Jun	Jul	Aug	Sep	Oct	Nov	Dec	Year
Mean daily maximum °C (°F)	4.9 (40.8)	4 (39)	4.8 (40.6)	7 (45)	9.8 (49.6)	12.4 (54.3)	14.9 (58.8)	15.5 (59.9)	13.4 (56.1)	9.7 (49.5)	7 (45)	5.3 (41.5)	9.1 (48.3)
Daily mean °C (°F)	3.2 (37.8)	2.4 (36.3)	3 (37)	5 (41)	7.6 (45.7)	10.4 (50.7)	12.9 (55.2)	13.6 (56.5)	11.7 (53.1)	8.2 (46.8)	5.5 (41.9)	3.8 (38.8)	7.3 (45.1)
Mean daily minimum °C (°F)	1.3 (34.3)	0.6 (33.1)	1.4 (34.5)	3.5 (38.3)	6 (43)	9 (48)	11.4 (52.5)	12.2 (54.0)	10.4 (50.7)	6.8 (44.2)	3.9 (39.0)	2 (36)	5.7 (42.3)
Average precipitation mm (inches)	93 (3.7)	78 (3.1)	79 (3.1)	60 (2.4)	42 (1.7)	55 (2.2)	50 (2.0)	67 (2.6)	90 (3.5)	89 (3.5)	90 (3.5)	101 (4.0)	894 (35.3)
Source 1: NOAA
Source 2: Yr

== See also ==
- List of lighthouses in Norway
- Lighthouses in Norway
