= Froan Chapel =

Church in Trøndelag, Norway

- Froan kapell
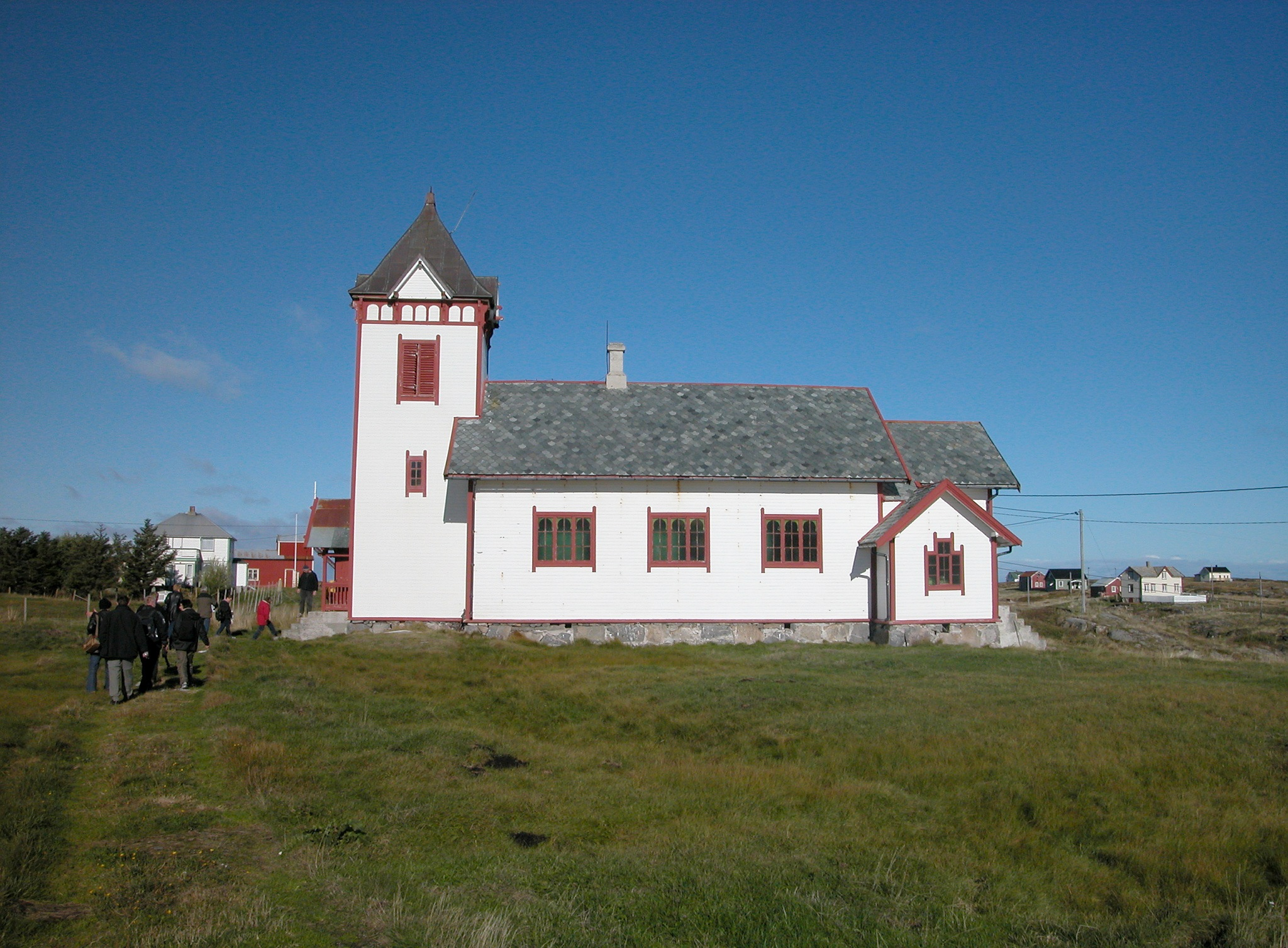
- View of the church
- Froan Chapel
- 63.9988523457°N 09.1727028787°E
- Location: Frøya Municipality, Trøndelag
- Country: Norway
- Denomination: Church of Norway
- Churchmanship: Evangelical Lutheran

History
- Status: Parish church
- Founded: 1904
- Consecrated: 1904

Architecture
- Functional status: Active
- Architect: Nils Ryjord
- Architectural type: Long church
- Completed: 1904 (122 years ago)

Specifications
- Capacity: 180
- Materials: Wood

Administration
- Diocese: Nidaros bispedømme
- Deanery: Orkdal prosti
- Parish: Frøya
- Norwegian Cultural Heritage Site
- Type: Church
- Status: Automatically protected
- ID: 84201

Froan Chapel (Norwegian: Froan kapell) is a parish church of the Church of Norway in Frøya Municipality in Trøndelag county, Norway. It is located on the island of Sauøy in the Froan islands. It is one of several churches for the Frøya parish which is part of the Orkdal prosti (deanery) in the Diocese of Nidaros. The white, wooden church was built in a long church design in 1904 using plans drawn up by the architect Nils Ryjord. The church seats about 180 people.

== History ==
By the 1890s, the people of the Froan islands were requesting their own church. The nearest church was Sletta Church, about 30 kilometres (19 mi) across the ocean which was a long journey. The small island of Sauøya, in the northeastern part of the archipelago, was chosen for the site of the new chapel. It was built in 1904 using plans by Nils Ryjord. The church was built to hold about 180 people because at the beginning of the 20th century, the islands were heavily populated. Originally, the chapel was scheduled to have five worship services each year. Confirmation instruction was held here beginning in 1906. By the start of the 21st century, the islands of Froan only have a few dozen residents, so the chapel is used less frequently.

== Media gallery ==
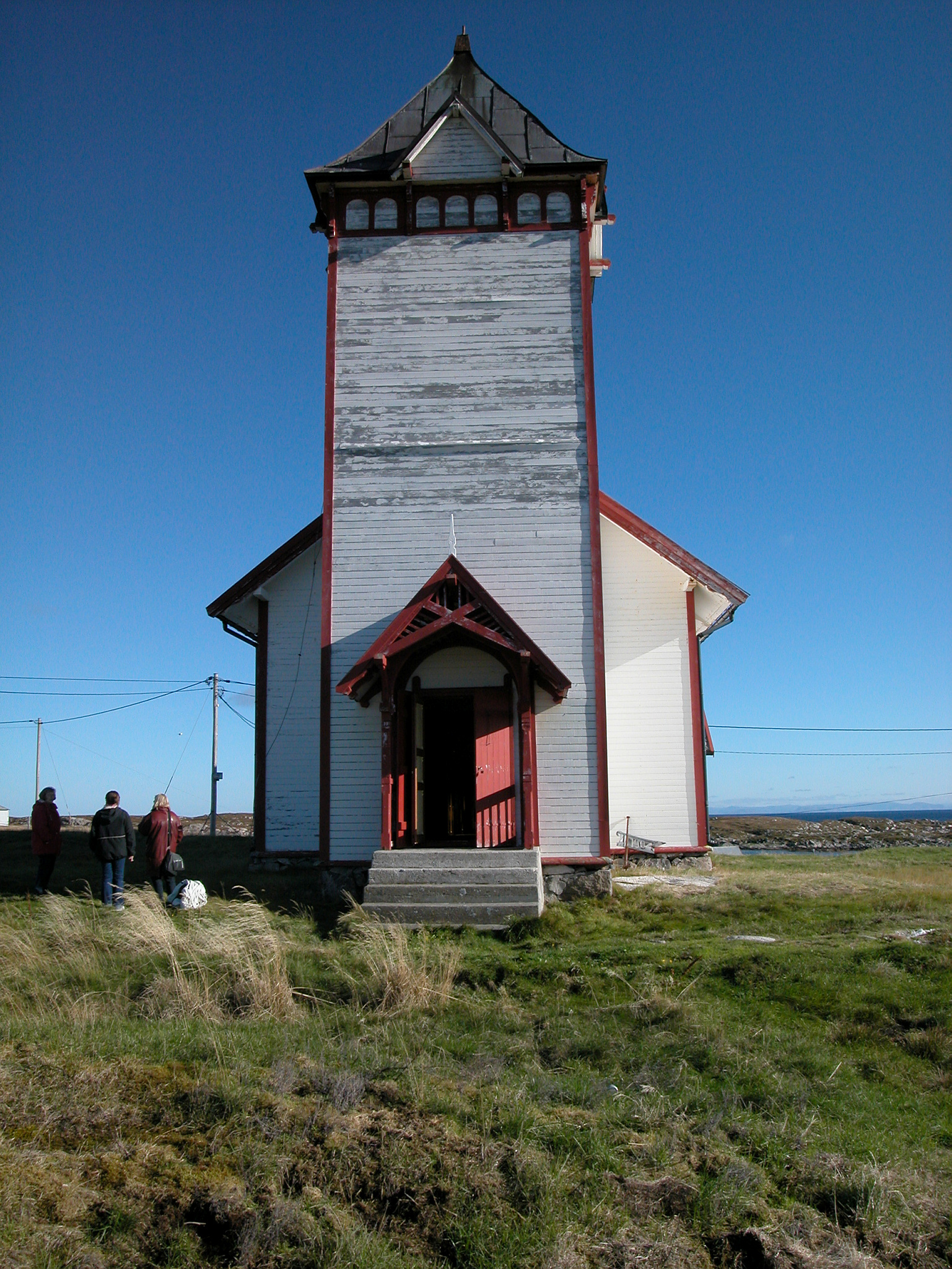

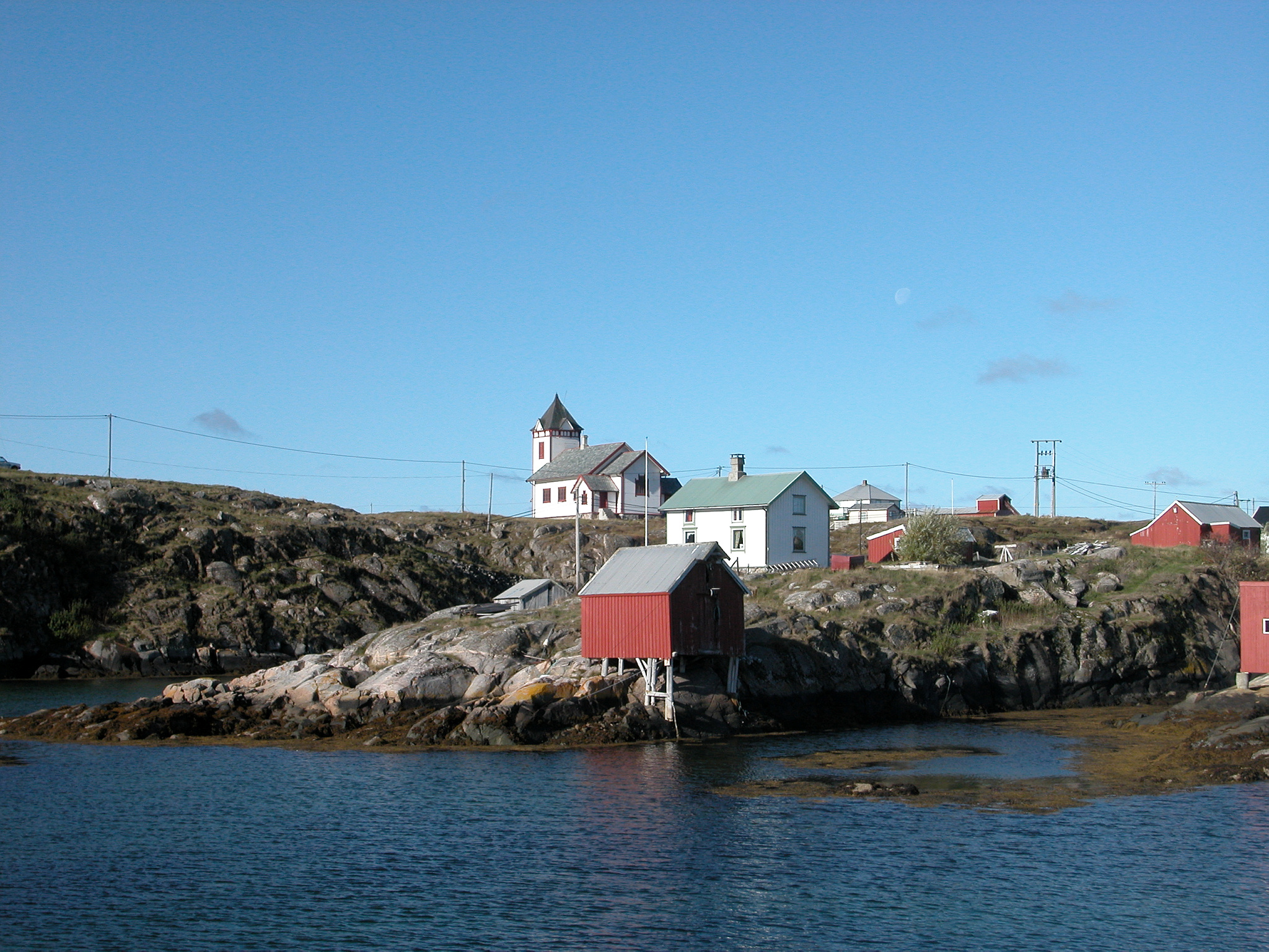

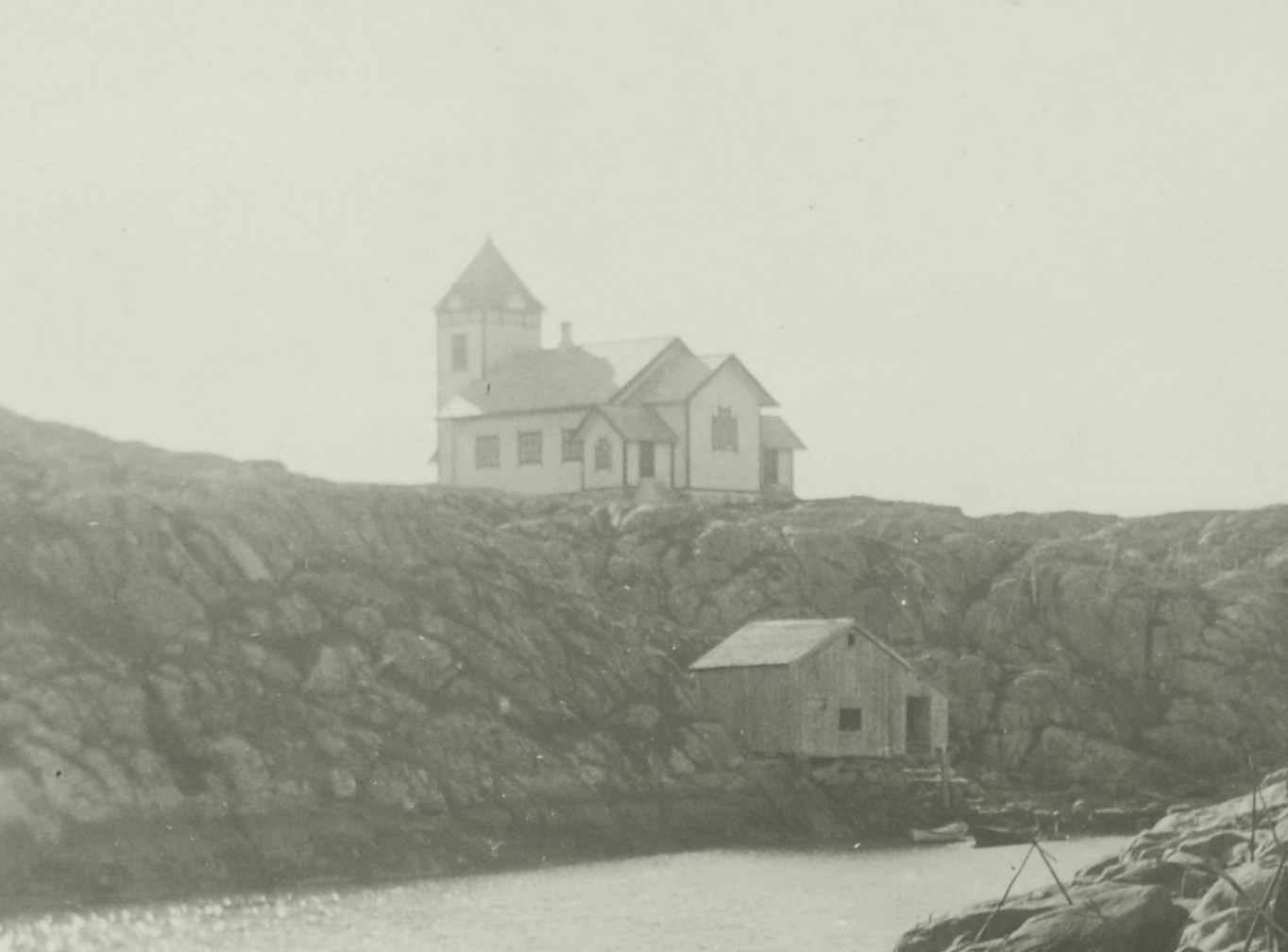

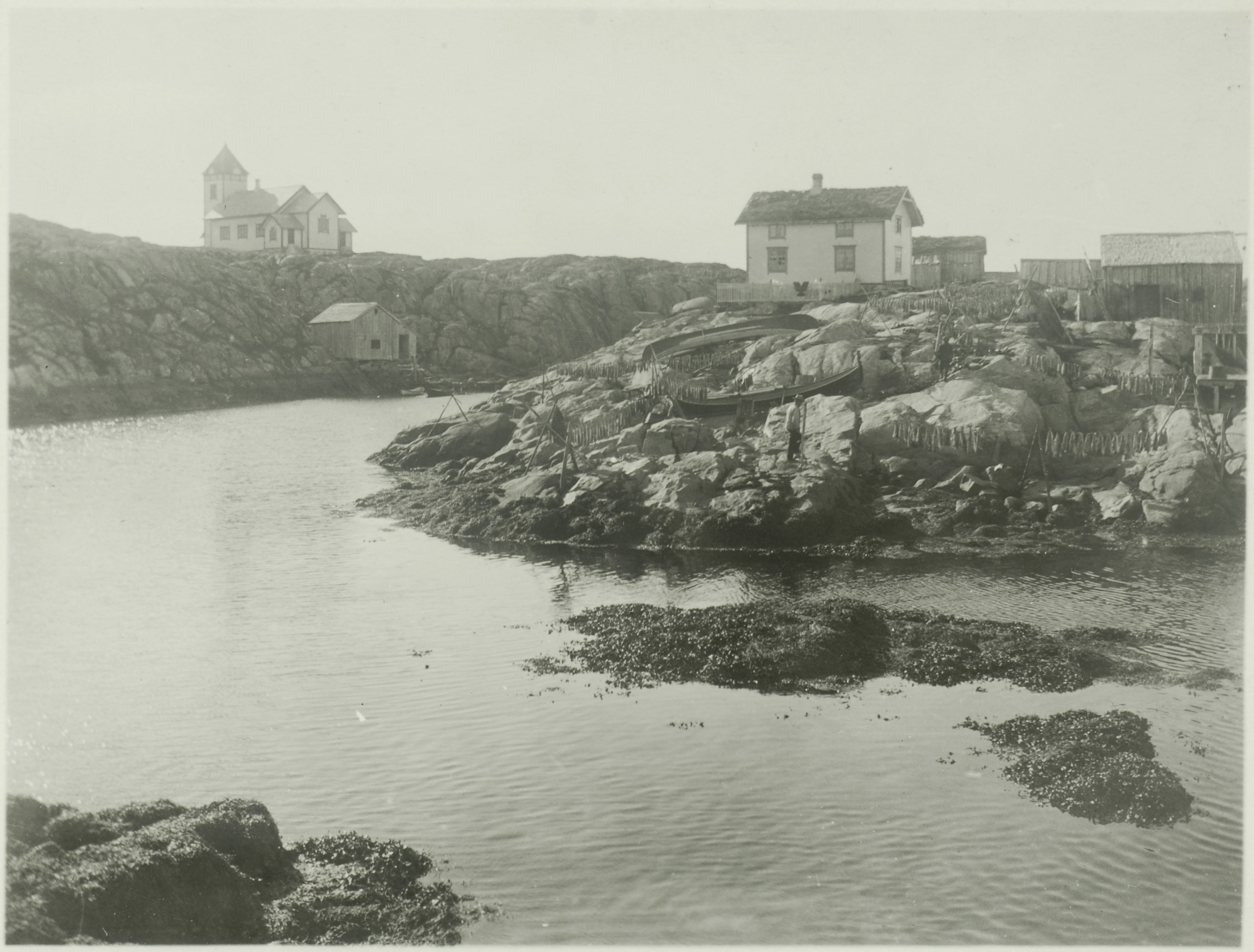

== See also ==
- List of churches in Nidaros
