= Halten, Trøndelag =

Village in Frøya Municipality, Norway

Halten
- Village
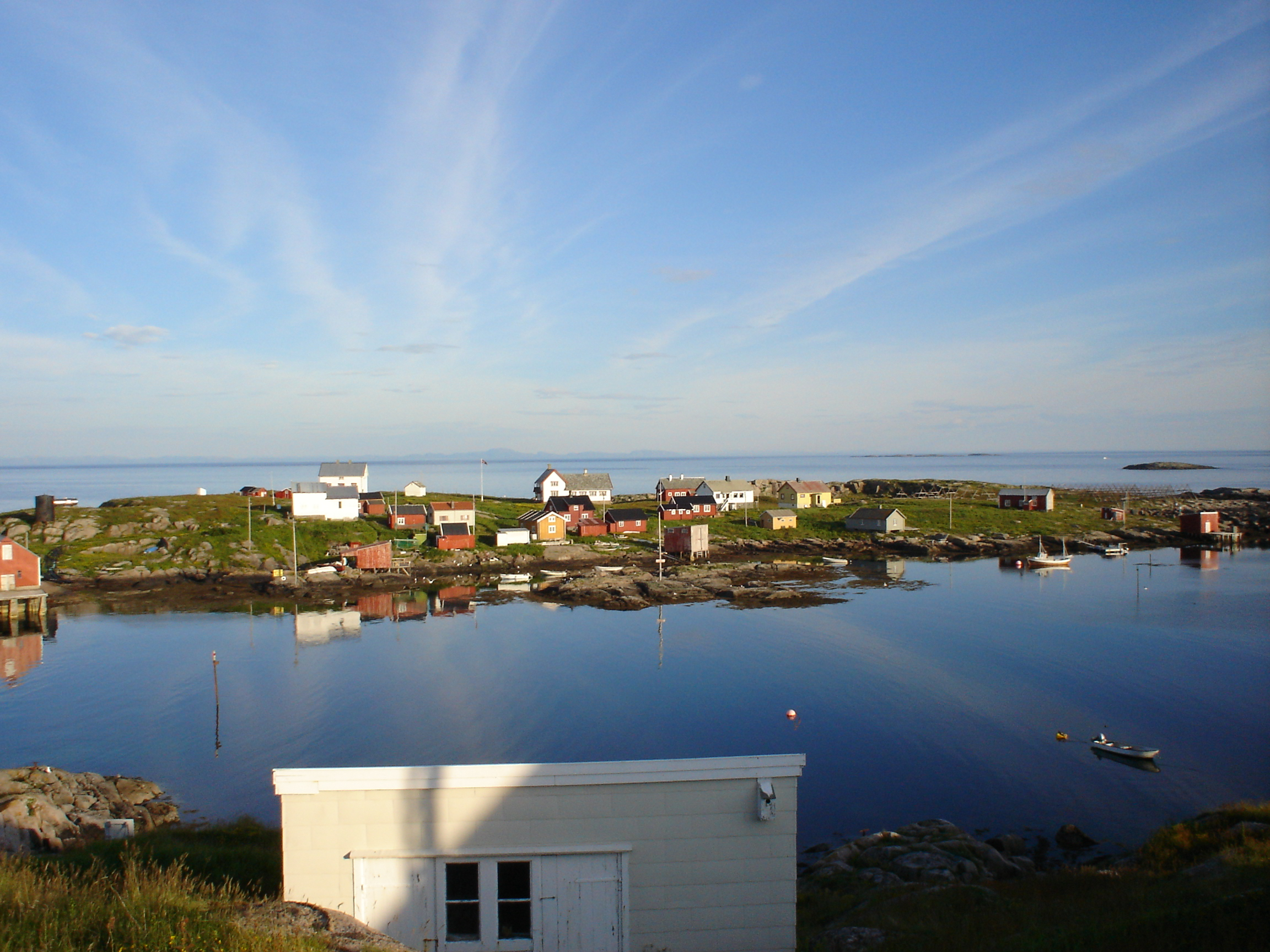
- View of the fishing village of Halten on Husøya
- Interactive map of Halten
- Location within Trøndelag Location within Norway
- Coordinates: 64.1704°N 09.4072°E
- Country: Norway
- Region: Central Norway
- County: Trøndelag
- District: Fosen
- Municipality: Frøya Municipality
- Elevation: 3 m (9.8 ft)
- Time zone: UTC+01:00 (CET)
  - Summer (DST): UTC+02:00 (CEST)
- Post Code: 7287 Sauøy

Halten is an unpopulated fishing village in Frøya Municipality in Trøndelag county, Norway. The village was located on several adjacent islands at the far northern end of the Froan island chain. They constituted the northernmost part of the string of islands north of Frøya, which stretch from Sula in the south to Halten in the north. Halten Lighthouse is located on the island of Halten in the central part of the fishing village. The fishing village primarily was located on the islands of Husøya, Halten, Steinsøya, and Rorsøya. A large breakwater was built to protect the harbour area of the village. The village has had no permanent residents since 1988, but during the summers there are many vacationers and tourists.

== History ==
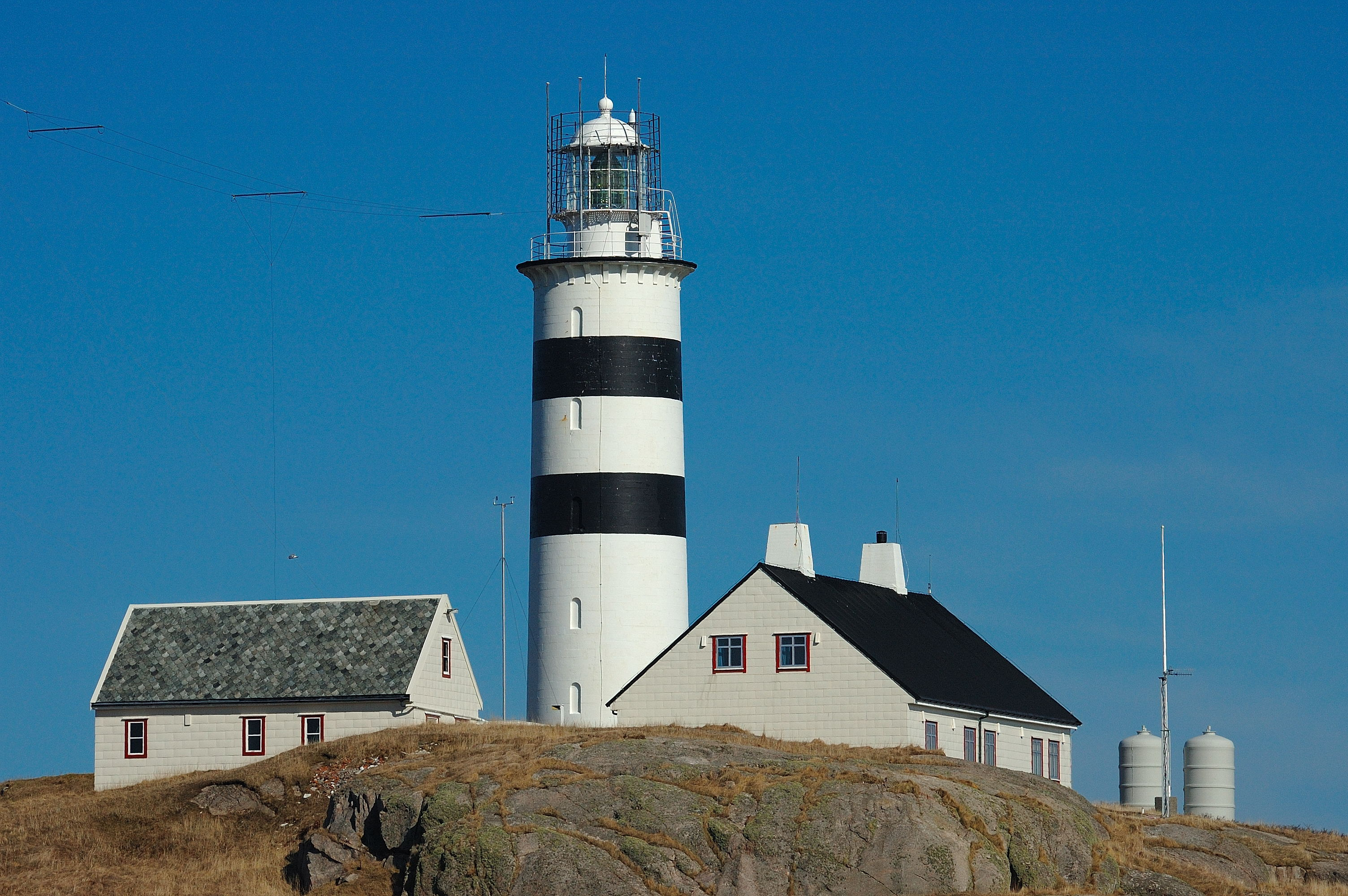
Halten Lighthouse

The earliest written confirmation of human settlement on Halten is from 1548, and it shows a payment of a charge for access to the islands. However, it is believed that Halten has been made use of much earlier than that.

In 1779, Henrik Borthen bought the Froan islands as a whole and the region remained in his family's possession until 1927 when a Sør-Trøndelag agricultural company bought the islands from the family and set the land free. Tobias Ulrik Borthen was responsible for most of the expansion and upgrading of the village of Halten, from 1868 and up until World War I. Tobias Borthen built a dock and a big Trønderlån (Skanklåna) which housed the local store and management and contained a radio station which was an important part of Haltens contact with the environmental society.

At the peak of its activity, Halten was the biggest fishing village off the coast of Trøndelag, with as many as 1,000 inhabitants during the main fishing seasons. The population reached a point where a hospital was established on Halten, though it was scarce compared to today's standards. The decline in activity on Halten started when fishing vessels got more and more modernised and had cabins which eliminated the need for housing for the visiting fishermen. In 1963, Skanklåna burned down to the ground, and that marked the beginning of the end of Halten as a community.

== Present-day Halten ==
Today there are no longer any permanent inhabitants at Halten, but the area is used in the summers by many people who use the houses as holiday cottages. Halten is also an attractive destination for visiting tourists. The houses on Halten all have special names like: Vestindien, Banken, Høiskolen, Telemonhei, Minde, Klasbua, Sykehuset, Tempelet, Svana, Havna, Ostindien, Bakklund, Britania and many more. The third Saturday of July each year is "Haltenday", when rømmegraut is served in Fiskarheimen (the old local community house) during the day and there is a folk dance in an old loft down on the dockhouse at night.

== Media gallery ==
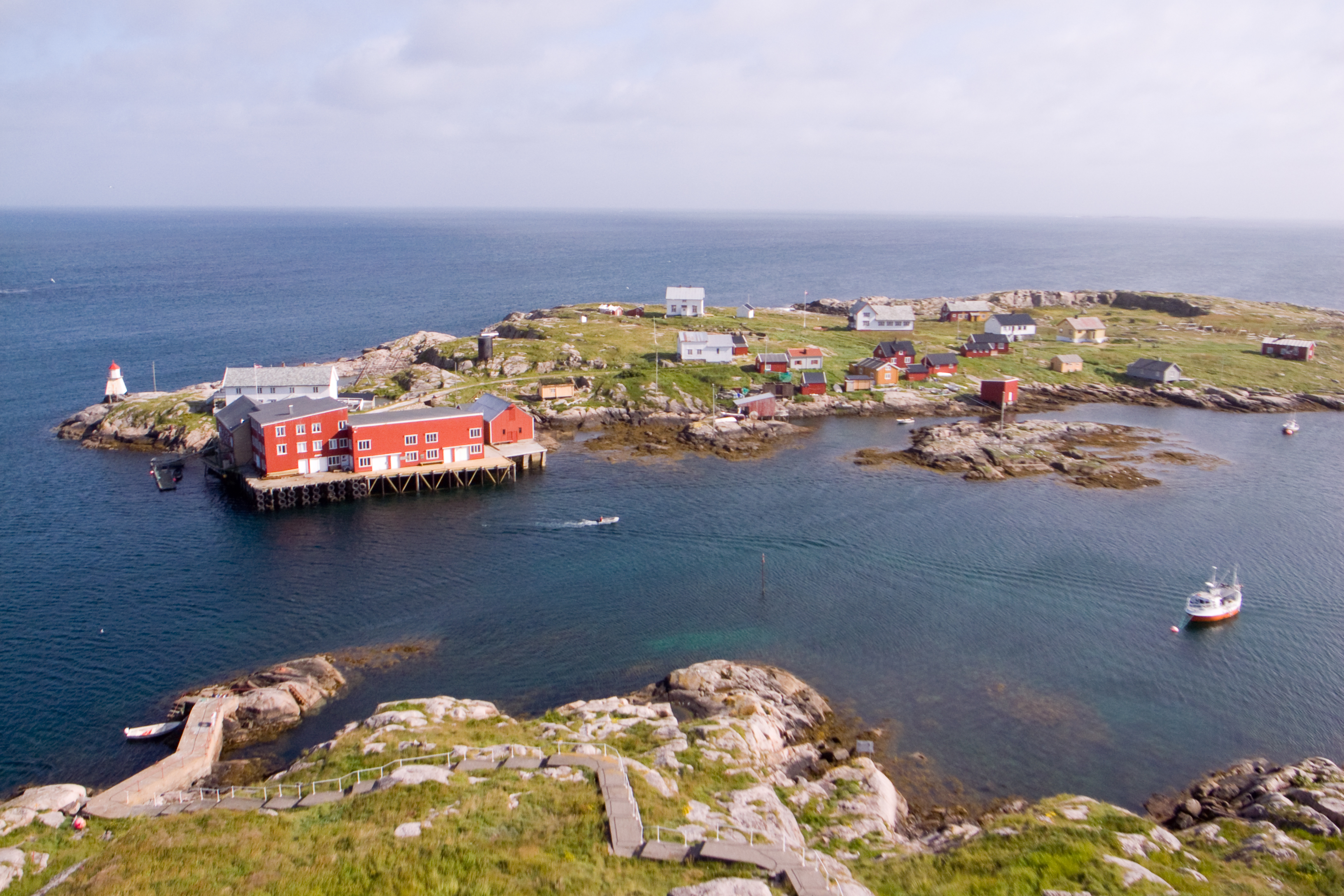

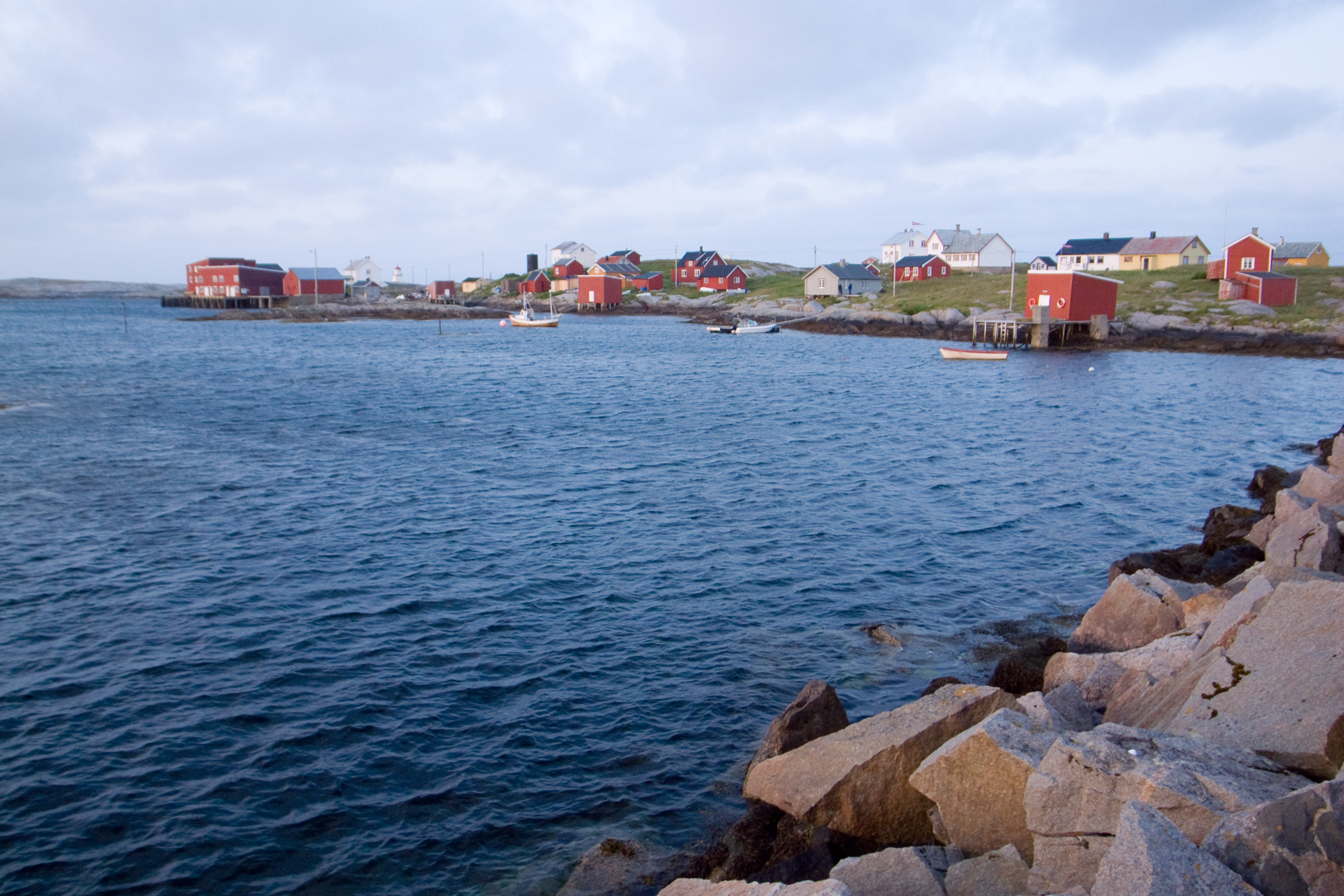

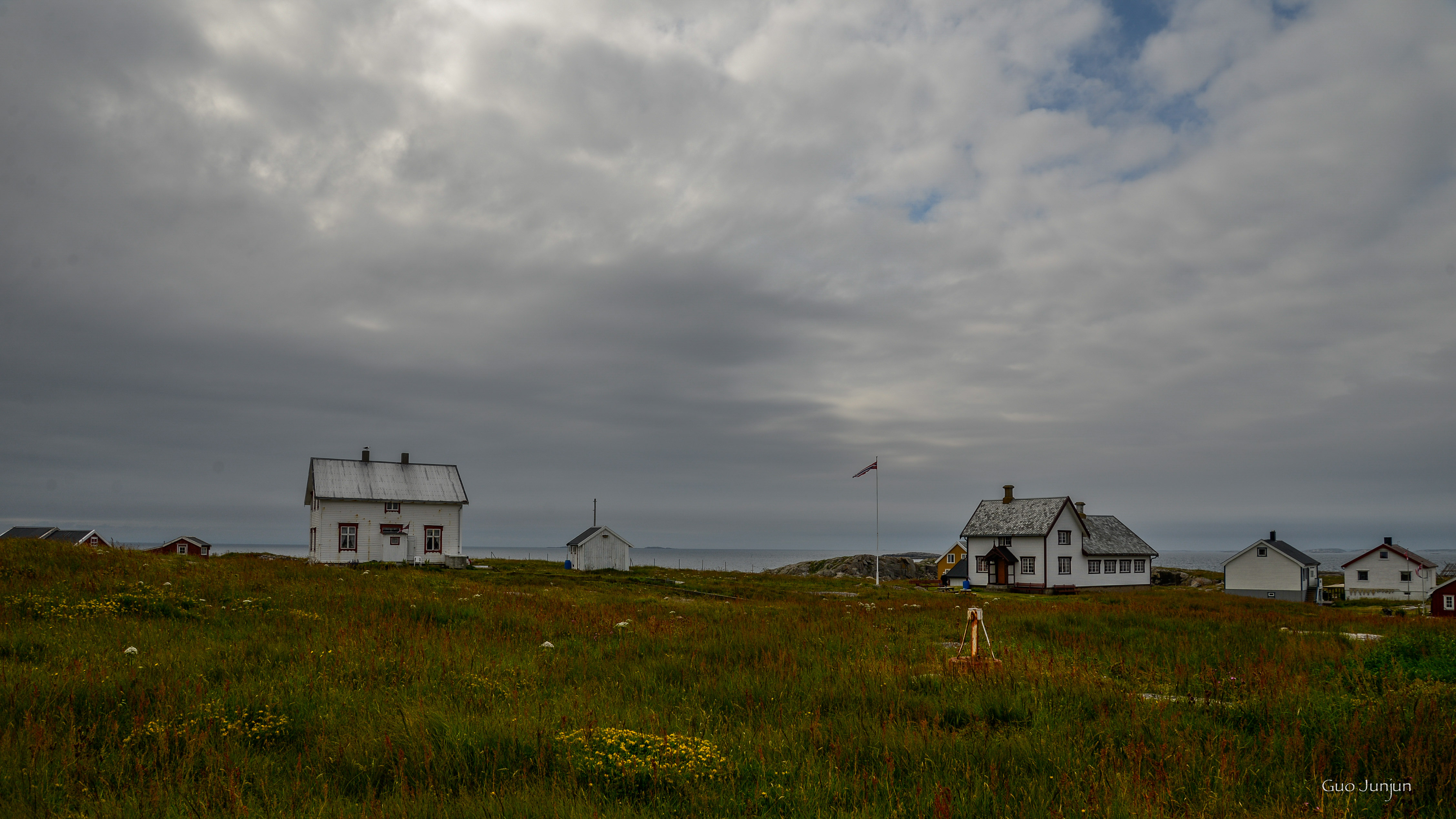

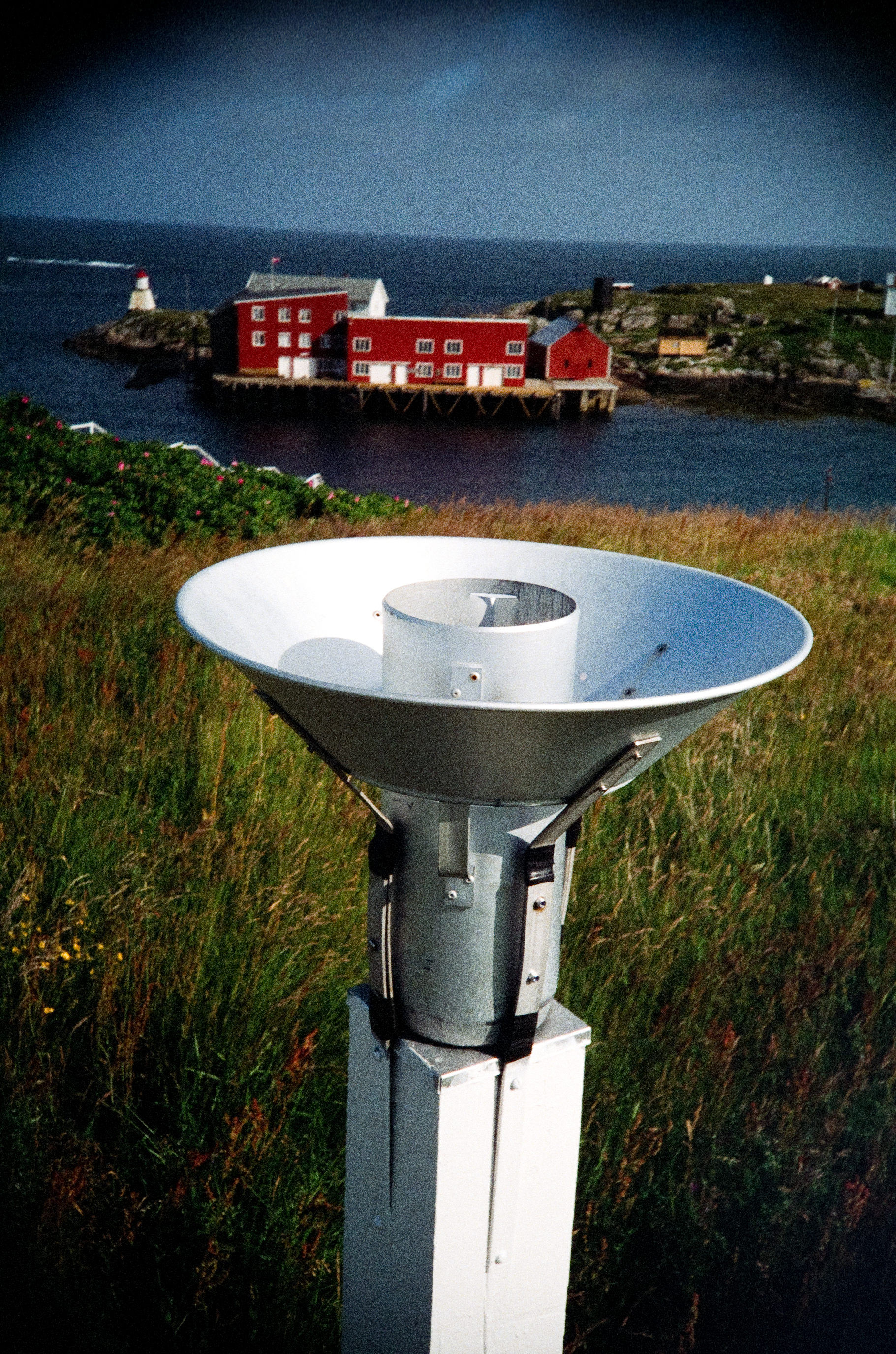

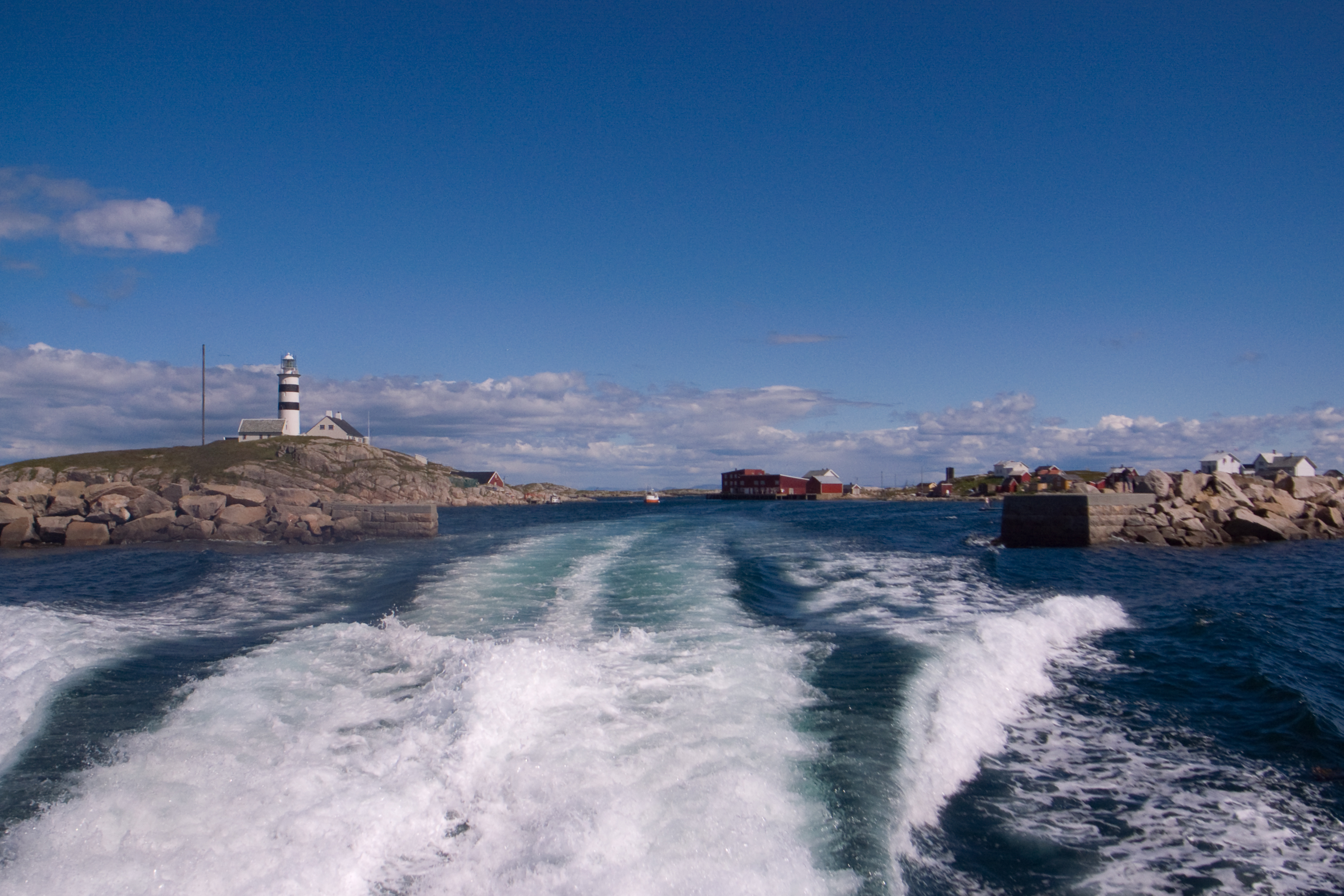

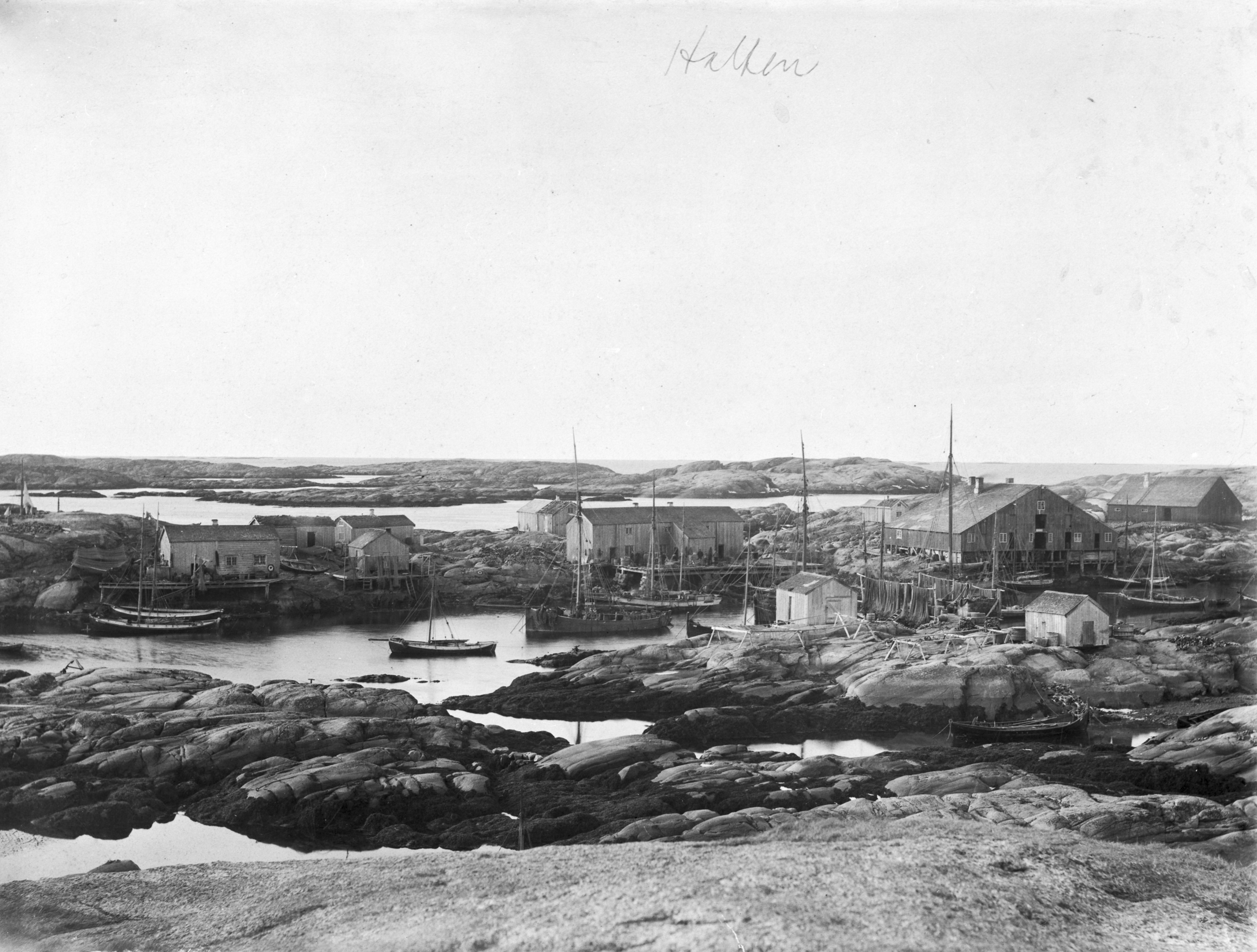

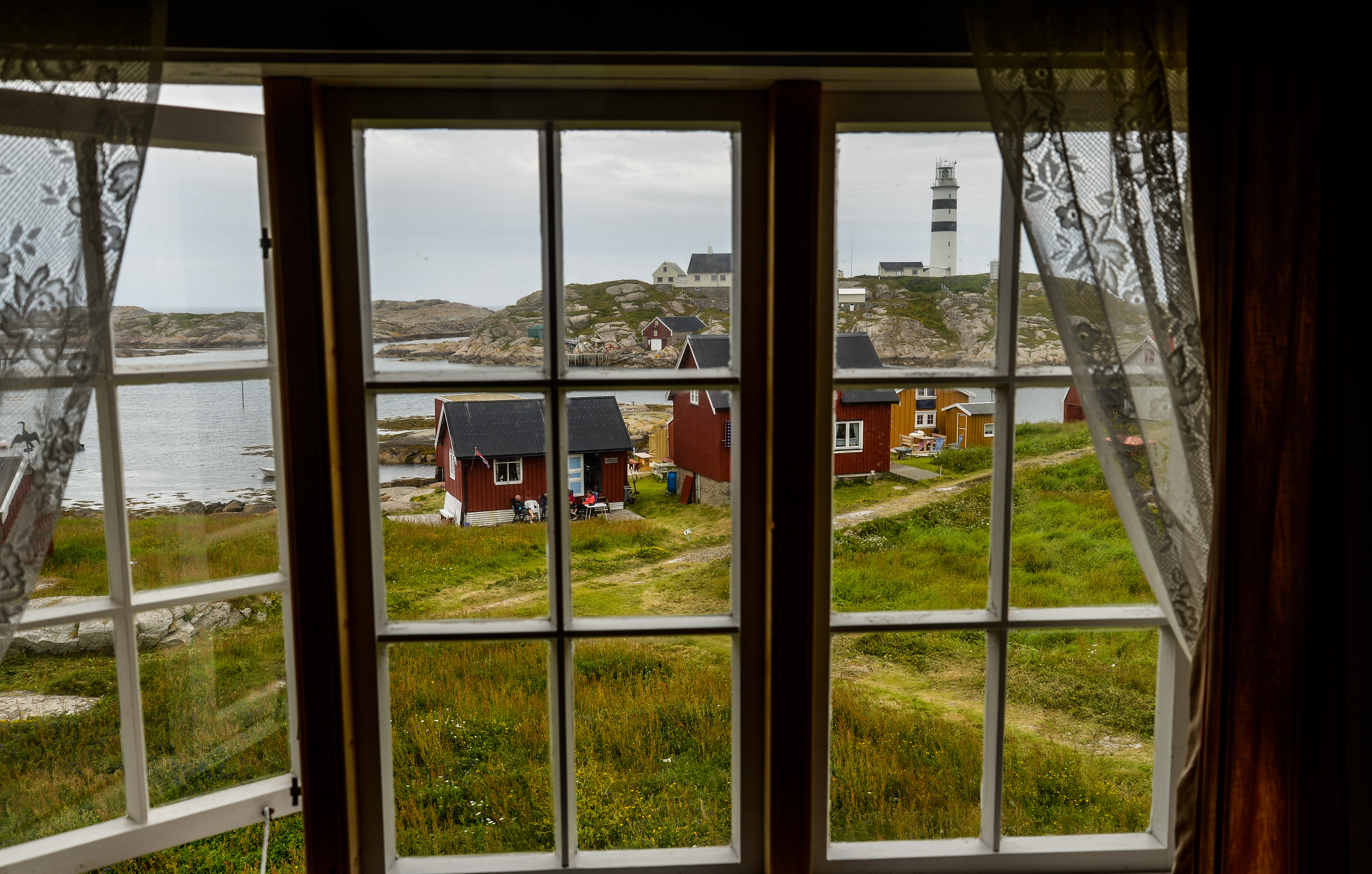

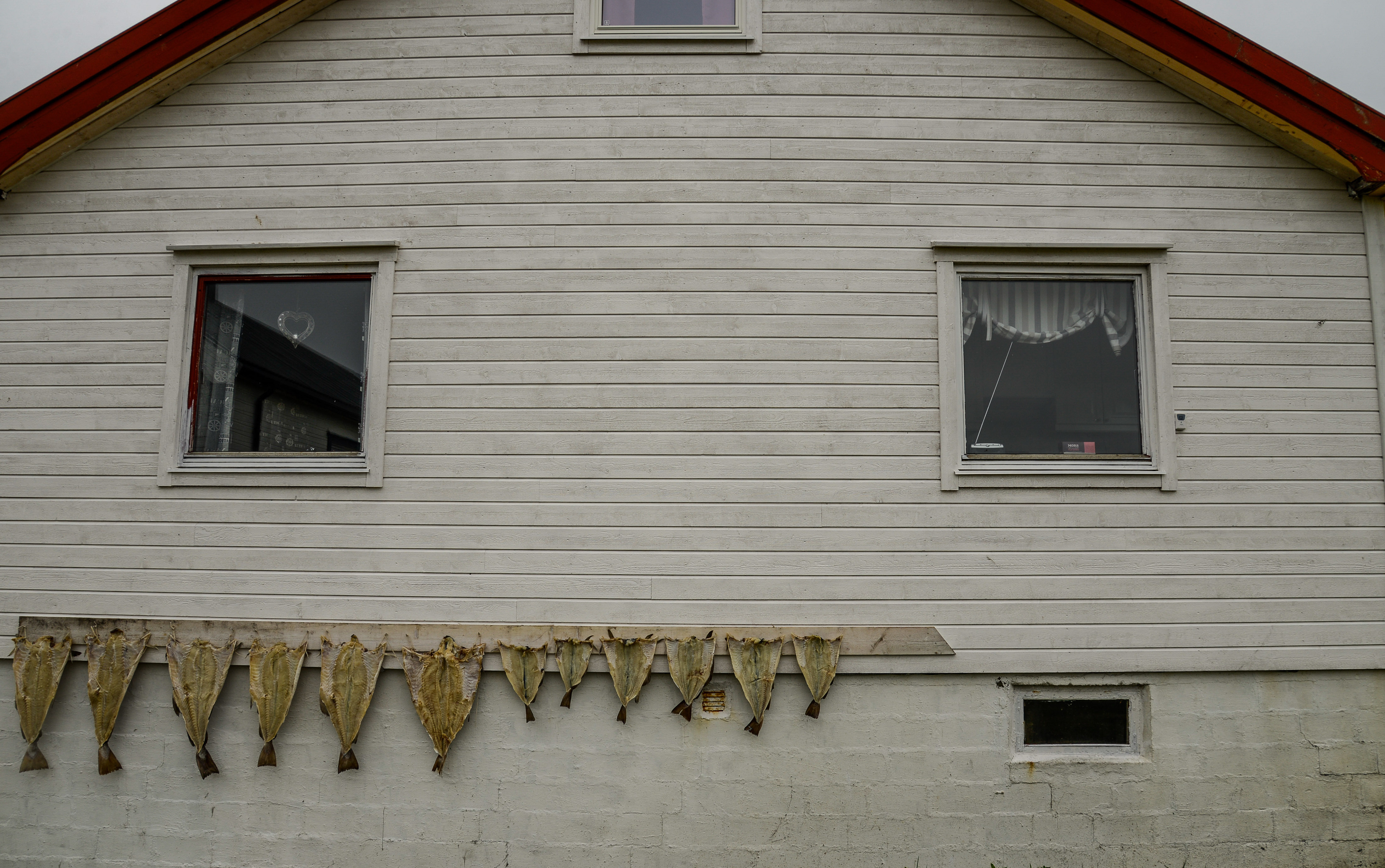

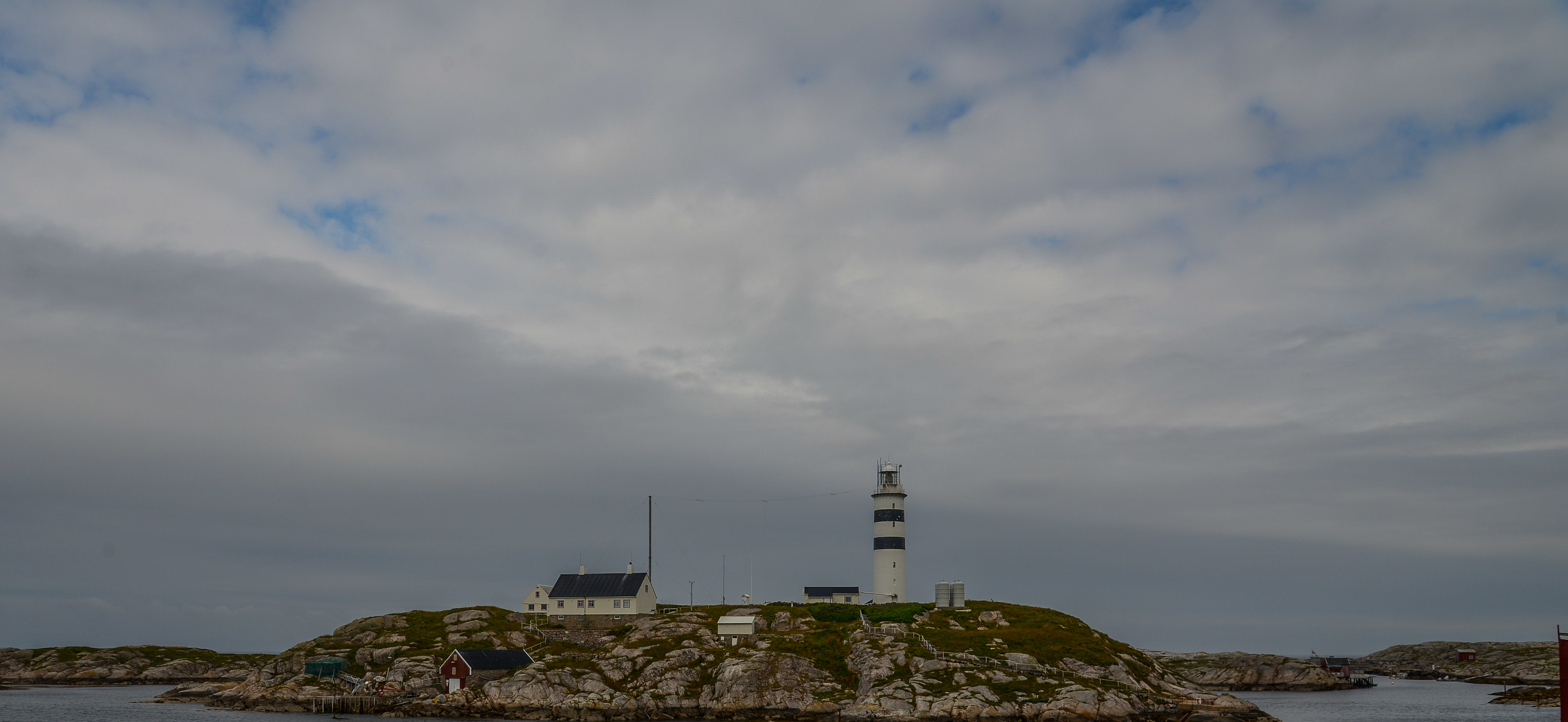
