= Froan =

Island group in Trøndelag, Norway

- Interactive map of Froan

Geography
- Location: Trøndelag, Norway
- Coordinates: 63.9928°N 09.0535°E
- Archipelago: Froan
- Length: 40 km (25 mi)

Administration
- Norway
- County: Trøndelag
- Municipality: Frøya Municipality

Demographics
- Population: 38 (2017)

Froan (or Froøyene) is a now unpopulated archipelago of small, rocky islands in Frøya Municipality in Trøndelag county, Norway.

== Geography ==
Froan consists of several hundred islands and islets that lie in the sea about 30 kilometres (19 mi) west of the Fosen peninsula. The islands run for about 40 kilometres (25 mi) in a northeasterly direction, parallel to the coastline. The island village of Halten lies at the northern end of the island chain. Only a few of the islands are inhabited, and in 2017, the population was only 38. The Froan Chapel, built in 1904, is located on the island of Sauøya. The Halten Lighthouse and others are located throughout the islands.

== Important Bird Area ==
The archipelago has been designated an Important Bird Area (IBA) by BirdLife International because it supports significant populations of breeding common eiders, European shags and great cormorants, as well as wintering long-tailed ducks, common and yellow-billed loons, purple sandpipers and black guillemots.

== See also ==
- List of islands of Norway
