= Carl Sundblad =

Swedish teacher, peace activist, and editor (1849–1933)

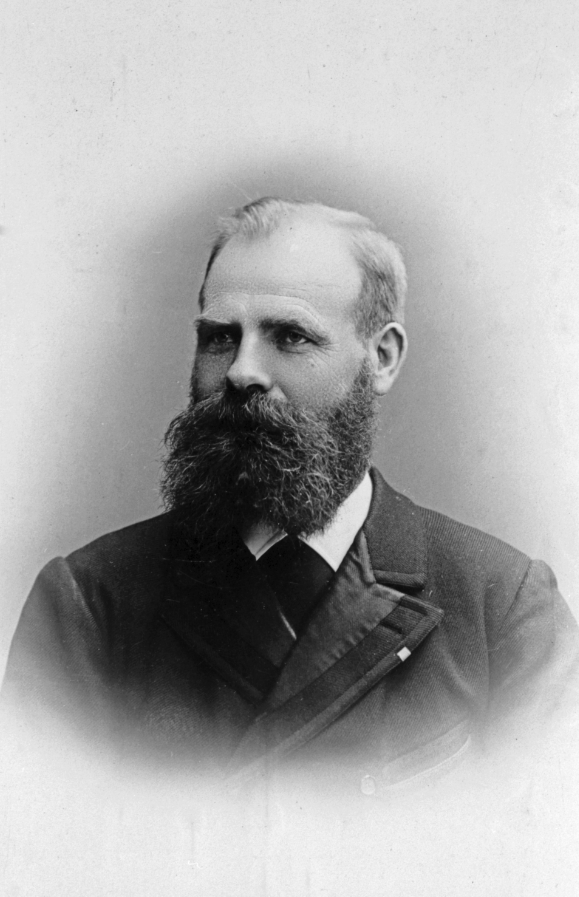
- Sundblad, c. 1890
- Born: Carl Anders Danielsson Sundblad; 11 September 1849; Höreda, Jönköping County, Sweden
- Died: 4 December 1933 (aged 84); Rönninge, Stockholm County, Sweden
- Burial place: Säby burial ground, Salem Municipality, Stockholm County, Sweden
- Education: Uppsala Teacher Training College
- Occupations: Head teacher (överlärare); writer; editor; peace activist
- Years active: 1878–1933
- Organization: Swedish Peace and Arbitration Society
- Known for: Swedish peace activism; Nobel Peace Prize nominee
- Political party: Free-minded National Association
- Movement: Peace movement
- Spouse: Sofia Charlotta Pettersson (m. 1876)
- Children: 6
- Honors: Knight of the Order of Vasa

Carl Anders Danielsson Sundblad (11 September 1849 – 4 December 1933) was a Swedish head teacher, writer, editor, and peace activist. Born in Jönköping County, he trained at the Uppsala Teacher Training College and served as head teacher at Wreta School in Stockholm County from 1880 to 1909, while simultaneously pursuing peace activism and liberal reform.

Sundblad was a central figure in the Swedish Peace and Arbitration Society (Svenska freds- och skiljedomsföreningen), serving as chairman, vice chairman, and honorary chairman. He has been credited with saving the Society from collapse when he assumed the chairmanship in the late 1880s. A prolific traveling lecturer on peace across Sweden and Norway over three decades, he also petitioned and advised monarchs and prime ministers on issues of arbitration, neutrality, and conscientious objection.

Sundblad edited the Society's two peace journals and authored numerous books and pamphlets, including a three-volume history of the Swedish peace movement. He was instrumental in establishing the world's first transboundary peace park, now known as Morokulien, on the Swedish–Norwegian border. He was also active in the suffrage movement, the Folkriksdag (a shadow parliament), and liberal politics through the Free-minded National Association. He was made a Knight of the Order of Vasa in 1932, and between 1913 and 1933 received thirteen nominations for the Nobel Peace Prize.

== Early life ==
Sundblad was born on 11 September 1849 in Höreda, Jönköping County, in the province of Småland. His father was Daniel Zachrisson, a fisherman, and his mother was Anna Andersdotter.

Sundblad did not attend elementary school as a child, but was home-schooled by local residents who recognized him as a naturally gifted reader (läshuvud, literally "reading head"). He received his certificate in elementary education (folkskollärareexamen) at the Uppsala Teacher Training College (Folkskoleseminariet i Uppsala) in 1875.

== Teaching career ==
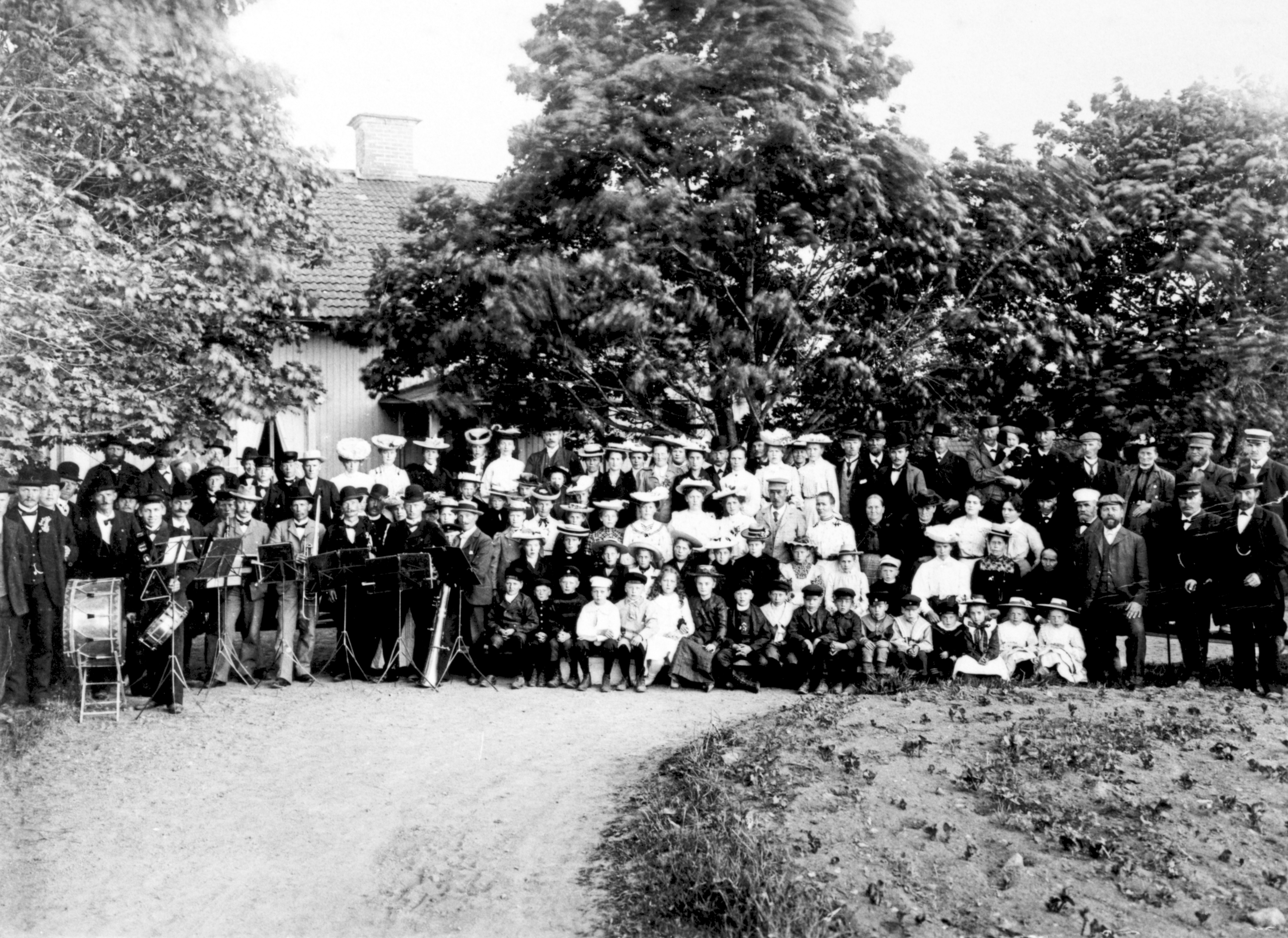
Carl Sundblad's 25th anniversary celebration at Wreta School, Sorunda, 1905

Sundblad's first teaching post was at Fasterna parish in Norrtälje Municipality, Stockholm County, from 1878 to 1880. He was hired soon after at Wreta School (Wreta skola), an elementary school (folkskola) in Sorunda, Nynäshamn Municipality, where he served from 1880 to 1909, rising to the rank of head teacher (överlärare) and living on the school premises with his family. In 1905, marking his twenty‑fifth year at the school, a large celebration was held featuring an orchestra. At his retirement in 1909, a farewell celebration was held on New Year's Eve at the schoolhouse.

During his years at Wreta, Sundblad became active in the Christian‑education revival among Swedish folk school teachers. The movement emerged during a period of growing debate over the place of Christianity in the public schools. At the organizational meeting held in Uppsala in August 1883, he was one of three delegates—together with educators Johan Bernhard Gauffin and Fredrik Lundgren—who drafted a proposal encouraging teachers to form local associations for mutual support. A five‑member bylaws committee was created, including Sundblad, to establish what became Friends of the Swedish Folk Schools (Svenska Folkskolans Vänner), later renamed the National Association for Christian Education (Riksförbundet Kristen Fostran) in 1971, an organization that remains active today.

Ten years after retiring from teaching, the Södertörn Teachers' Association elected him an honorary member, a title he held from 1920 to 1927.

== Swedish Peace and Arbitration Society ==
Sundblad was an early member of the Swedish Peace and Arbitration Society, founded on 2 April 1883 by forty‑two Riksdag members headed by Klas Pontus Arnoldson; it remains active today and is the world's oldest still‑active peace association. In 1885 he founded a local branch of the Society in his home parish of Sorunda.

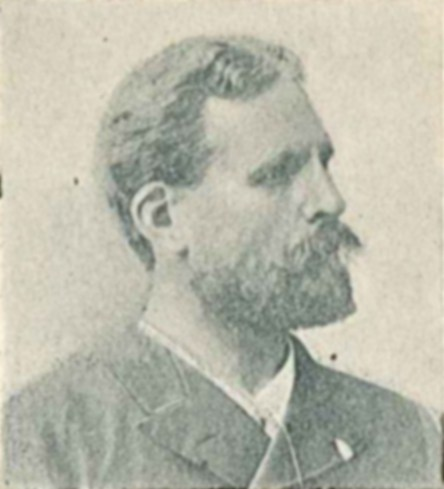
Edvard Wavrinsky, 1897

After only four years he was elected to the national Society's centralstyrelsen (central board), serving alongside Edvard Wavrinsky and other leading reformers. When the Society fell into difficulties, Sundblad was elected chairman in 1888. The Swedish historian Per Fogelström credited Sundblad with saving the Society from collapse when he took over the chairmanship in 1888, describing him as its eldsjäl (driving spirit).

Sundblad chaired the Society until 1896, subsequently serving as vice chairman. Throughout his tenure he was known as the Society's missionsföreståndare (missions director), leading the Society's public outreach and many initiatives. In 1924 he was appointed honorary chairman of the Society, a title he held until his death. According to contemporary reports, the Society's membership grew from 447 at the end of its first year to around 3,000 by 1901, tripling to 10,000 during World War I, and reaching 40,000 members in 1,742 local branches across 25 districts by the time of its fiftieth anniversary in 1933.

Sundblad edited two peace journals as part of his Society work. The first, Ned med vapnen (Down with Arms), he edited from 1893 to 1897. The second, Fredsfanan (Peace Flag), he co‑founded in 1898 with Knut Sandstedt and edited until 1904; Fredsfanan continued publication until 1922 under subsequent editors. He also authored a three-volume history of the Swedish peace movement, Svenska fredsrörelsens historia (History of the Swedish Peace Movement); the first two volumes were commissioned by the Society's central board for its 20th anniversary jubilee in 1903, with a third volume following in 1919. For a fuller list of his publications see Writing and editing below.

== Causes and campaigns ==
=== Peace ===
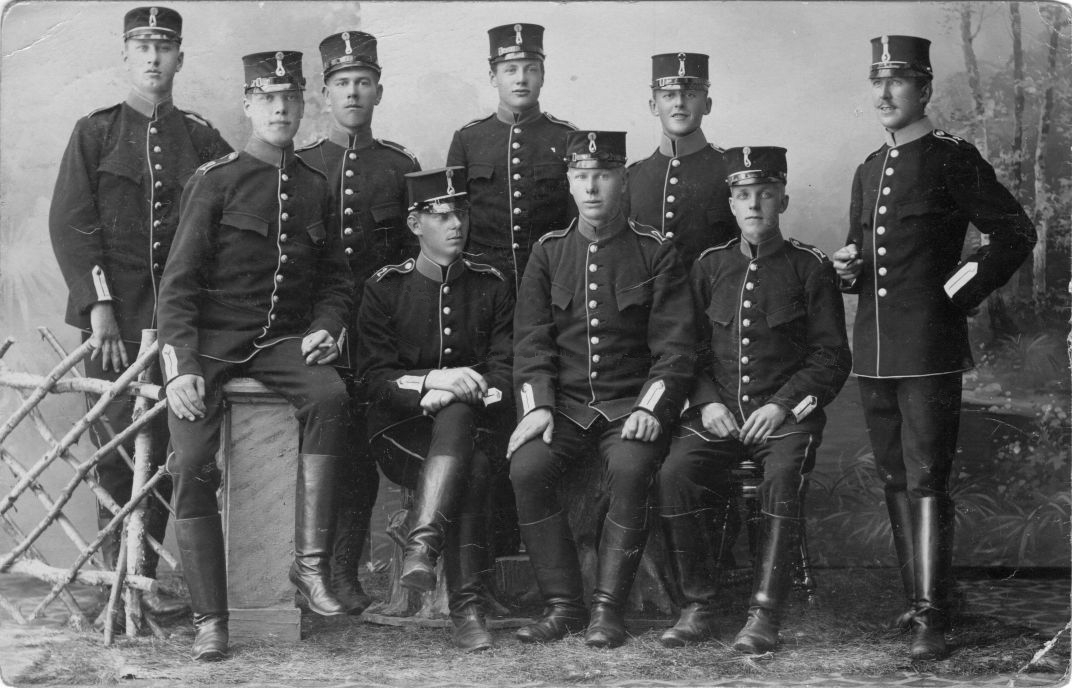
Swedish infantrymen, 1905

Sundblad's peace activism developed during recurring European military crises — the aftermath of the Franco-Prussian War (1870–71), tensions within the union between Sweden and Norway (including the 1894–96 crisis and the dissolution of the union between Norway and Sweden in 1905), the Russification of Finland, accelerating militarization before World War I, and the rise of Hitler in Germany ahead of World War II. The Swedish peace movement sought to counter militarism by shaping public opinion, influencing parliamentary debate, and petitioning and advising monarchs, while promoting international arbitration as an alternative to armed conflict. In his 1918 history of the Swedish peace movement, Sundblad framed this work in terms of inevitable moral progress, arguing that war was a declining institution and that "the war system is exhausting its last life force."

Sundblad was the Society's principal traveling lecturer for more than three decades, delivering an estimated 3,500 to 4,000 peace lectures in Sweden and Norway at churches, schools, concert halls, and outdoor gatherings. He delivered keynote addresses at Nordic peace congresses, spoke at memorial dedications and Nobel Prize celebrations, and addressed audiences ranging from small parish gatherings to crowds of several thousand, earning him the nickname Fredsmissionären (The Peace Missionary).

==== Swedish–Norwegian crisis, 1894–1896 ====
During the political crisis of 1894–1896 in the Swedish–Norwegian union, Sundblad's outreach intensified into a coordinated national campaign against military action. Sundblad recounts that he devoted "all his available time" to a speaking tour across Sweden. Under his and Edvard Wavrinsky's leadership, the Swedish Peace and Arbitration Society helped organize mass protest meetings that publicly urged peace with Norway and rejected the use of force.

In the summer of 1896, Sundblad played a central role in gathering around 250,000 signatures in support of permanent arbitration treaties and a peaceful approach to political tensions in the Swedish–Norwegian union. Sundblad later recalled the physical strain of coordinating the effort from his home in Sorunda, describing how he hauled "sacks of circulars" to the distant post station with the help of his sons and "nearly worked myself to death." He also recounted presenting the completed petition to Oscar II, who reportedly told him: "these days it isn't we kings and heads of state who decide about war and peace — the peoples decide that themselves." According to Sundblad, the petition contributed to the king's subsequent support for arbitration treaties, expressed in the royal address to the Riksdag in 1898.

==== Rising militarism before World War I ====
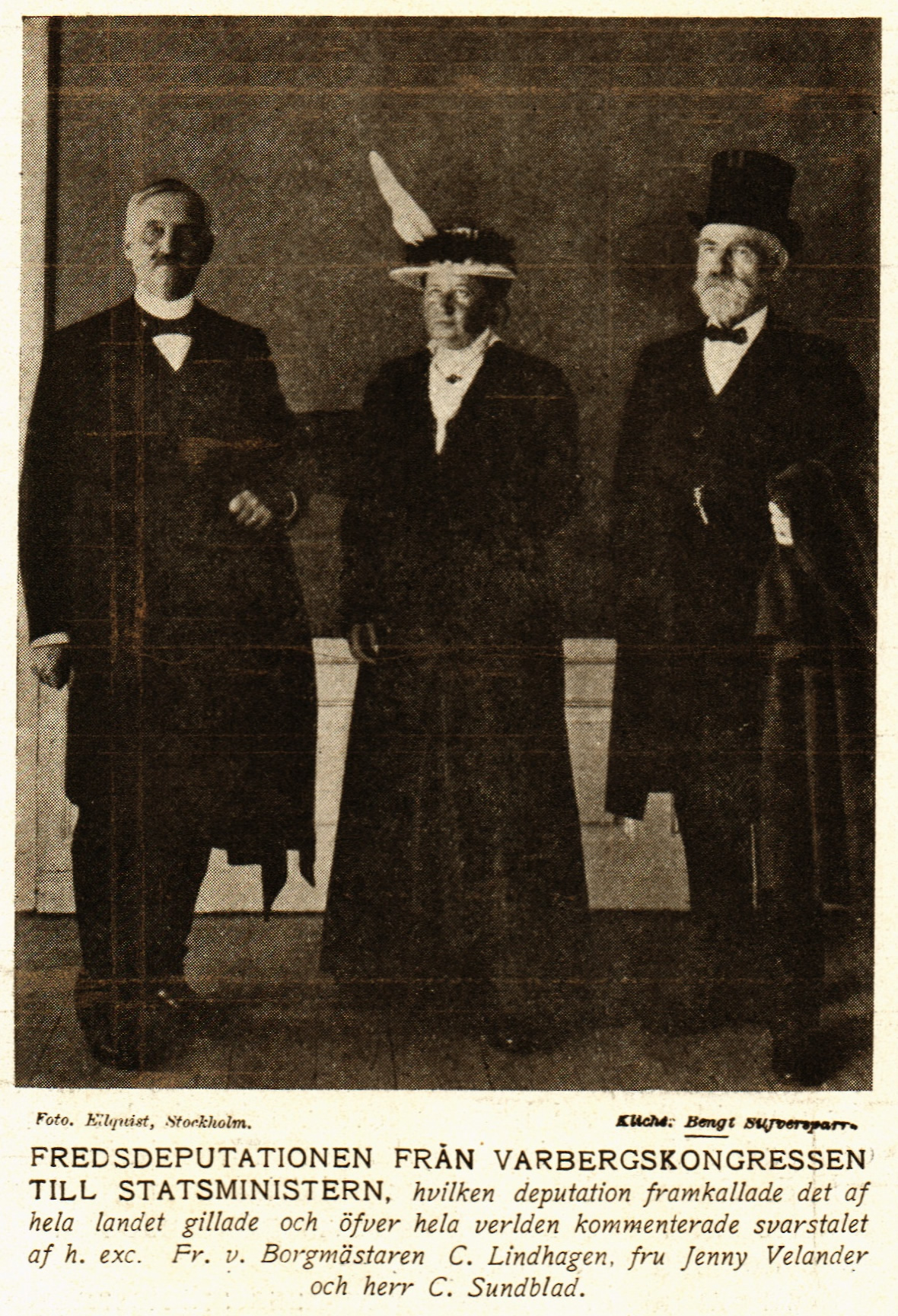
The peace deputation to Prime Minister Hjalmar Hammarskjöld, July 1915. Left to right: Carl Lindhagen, Jenny Velander, and Carl Sundblad.

A growing militarist current also shaped the political climate of the early 1910s. Public figures such as explorer Sven Hedin argued for major military expansion, and the conservative Bondetåget (Farmers' March) of 1914 signaled rising pressure for rearmament. Sundblad addressed these arguments in his 1912 pamphlet Svar på Sven Hedins varningsord (Answer to Sven Hedin's Words of Warning), published under the pseudonym "Harald Svenske," which offered a direct rebuttal to Hedin's militarist rhetoric gaining ground in Swedish politics.

In August 1912, Sundblad and Society secretary Emil Larsson were received in private audience by Gustaf V, to whom they presented a formal address of thanks for the Swedish king's efforts to improve Swedish–Russian relations following his meeting with Tsar Nicholas II.

In July 1915, during World War I, he was one of three official delegates appointed by the General Swedish Peace Congress in Varberg — alongside former magistrate of Stockholm Carl Lindhagen and suffrage activist Jenny Velander — to present peace resolutions to Prime Minister Hjalmar Hammarskjöld and Foreign Minister Knut Wallenberg. The resolutions called on the Swedish, Danish, and Norwegian governments to jointly initiate a peace conference of neutral states and to offer themselves as mediators to help the combatant governments of the First World War begin peace negotiations.

==== Morokulien peace monument ====
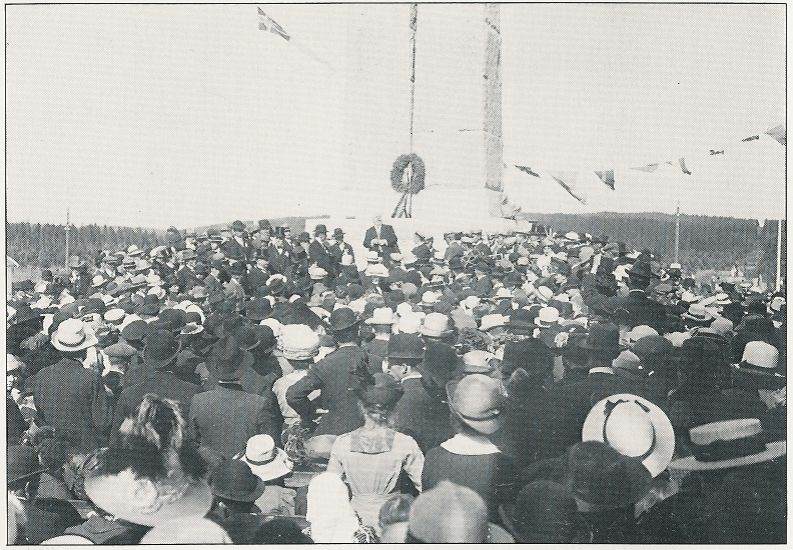
Inauguration of the peace monument at the Swedish–Norwegian border, 1914

One of the most enduring physical legacies of Sundblad's peace work was his role in creating the peace monument on the Swedish–Norwegian border. The site is the world's first transboundary peace park and is now known as Morokulien.

The idea for a Swedish–Norwegian peace monument was first proposed at the Sixth Nordic Peace Meeting in Stockholm in 1910 and approved at a subsequent Nordic peace congress in Kristiania in 1912. Sundblad spearheaded fundraising and served as chairman of the Swedish monument committee. In January 1913 he was one of three representatives who inspected and selected the site near Charlottenberg and proposed that the Society purchase a small parcel of land from Eda Glassworks where the main railway and road cross the border. Sundblad envisioned not just a monument but a permanent "people's meeting place" for annual Swedish–Norwegian peace, temperance, and youth gatherings. In a letter to Swedish Foreign Minister Carl August Ehrensvärd, he argued that a peace monument raised jointly by two nations would produce "a doubly strong effect outward" compared to one raised by a single country.

The project drew fierce opposition from the Swedish right. Sven Hedin denounced it as "a mark of shame over a hundred years of inaction," Stockholms Dagblad called it "an affront to the Swedish realm," and critics objected particularly to its placement on the border, which they associated with the Norwegian frontier fortifications that had been a flashpoint during the union negotiations.

Despite this opposition, the inauguration on 16 August 1914 — two weeks after the outbreak of World War I — drew an estimated 12,000 people, far exceeding the expected 3,000. Sundblad was one of the principal speakers, alongside Jørgen Løvland, President of the Norwegian Storting, and Bishop Knut Henning Gezelius von Schéele of Sweden.

=== Conscientious objection ===
Alongside his broader peace advocacy, Sundblad took a consistent stand on the rights of those who refused military service, or spoke out against war, on grounds of conscience.

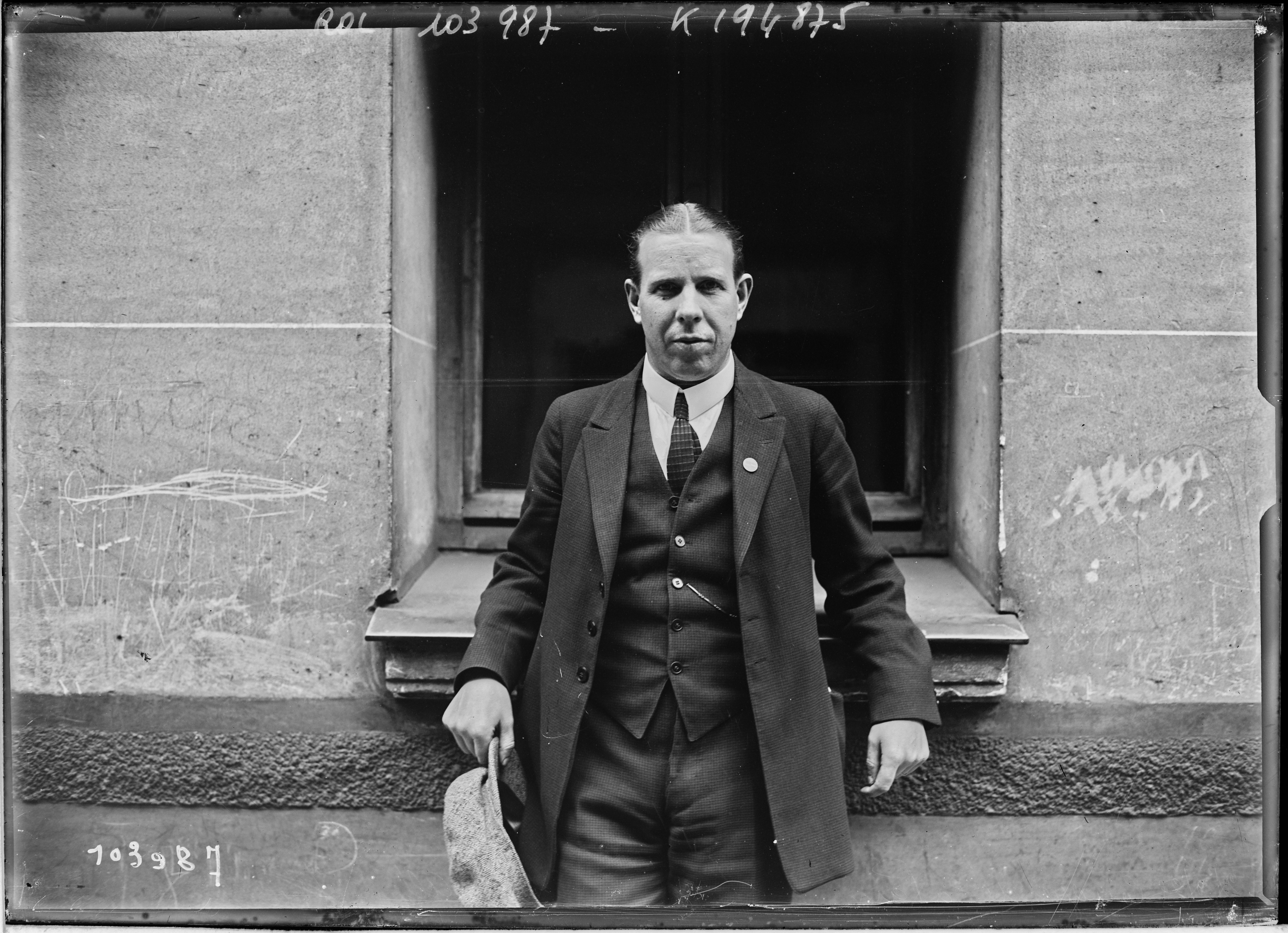
Albert Wickman, 1925

In February 1915, he and Riksdag member Nils August Nilsson presented a petition to Prime Minister Hjalmar Hammarskjöld on behalf of Baptist pastor and peace agitator Albert Wickman from Lund, who had been imprisoned for refusing military service on religious grounds. The petition argued that Sweden's constitution guaranteed freedom of conscience. The Prime Minister received the delegation positively and promised to bring the matter before the government.

In November 1916, he was among the signatories of an amnesty petition presented to Prime Minister Carl Swartz on behalf of citizens convicted for their work for peace and against the country's involvement in the war.

At the ninth Nordic Peace Congress in Kristiania, planned for late 1917 and held in September 1918, Sundblad was named as the Swedish speaker on the abolition of compulsory military service.

In December 1920, Sundblad and Knut Sandstedt, described in the press as "the leading men of the Swedish Peace and Arbitration Society," successfully petitioned King Gustaf V for a royal pardon for conscript David Wallin — one of the last remaining conscientious objectors still serving a sentence — who had been sentenced by the Military Court of Appeal to one month's imprisonment for refusing to obey orders given by a superior officer.

=== Universal suffrage ===
Sundblad was an active participant in the Swedish suffrage movement, which he regarded as inseparable from the broader peace cause. As early as 1890, during his nomination campaign for the Riksdag (see Politics), he promoted rösträttsföreningar (local suffrage associations) while touring Dalarna.

In July 1892 he delivered a public lecture in Falun, Dalarna, on suffrage and the proposed Folkriksdag (People's Parliament). The Folkriksdag was an unofficial shadow parliament created by the suffrage movement to challenge the Riksdag's property-ownership requirement for voting — a rule that locked out the poor and working class. Women faced a separate and total exclusion from voting, a prohibition not lifted until 1921. The event drew an audience of roughly 200, almost exclusively men; when Sundblad asked those who endorsed the proposal to rise to their feet, all but three did so.

Sundblad later served as the delegate for Sorunda at both the 1893 and 1896 sessions of the Folkriksdag. In the lead-up to the 1893 session, the Brännkyrka Suffrage Association unanimously nominated him as one of its six official candidates for Stockholm County. Supporters in Östhammar, Uppsala County, also nominated Sundblad for a seat in the Folkriksdag, listing him alongside Carl Sandquist — a fellow alumnus of Uppsala Teacher Training College and later a Riksdag member. Sundblad served as the Sorunda representative.

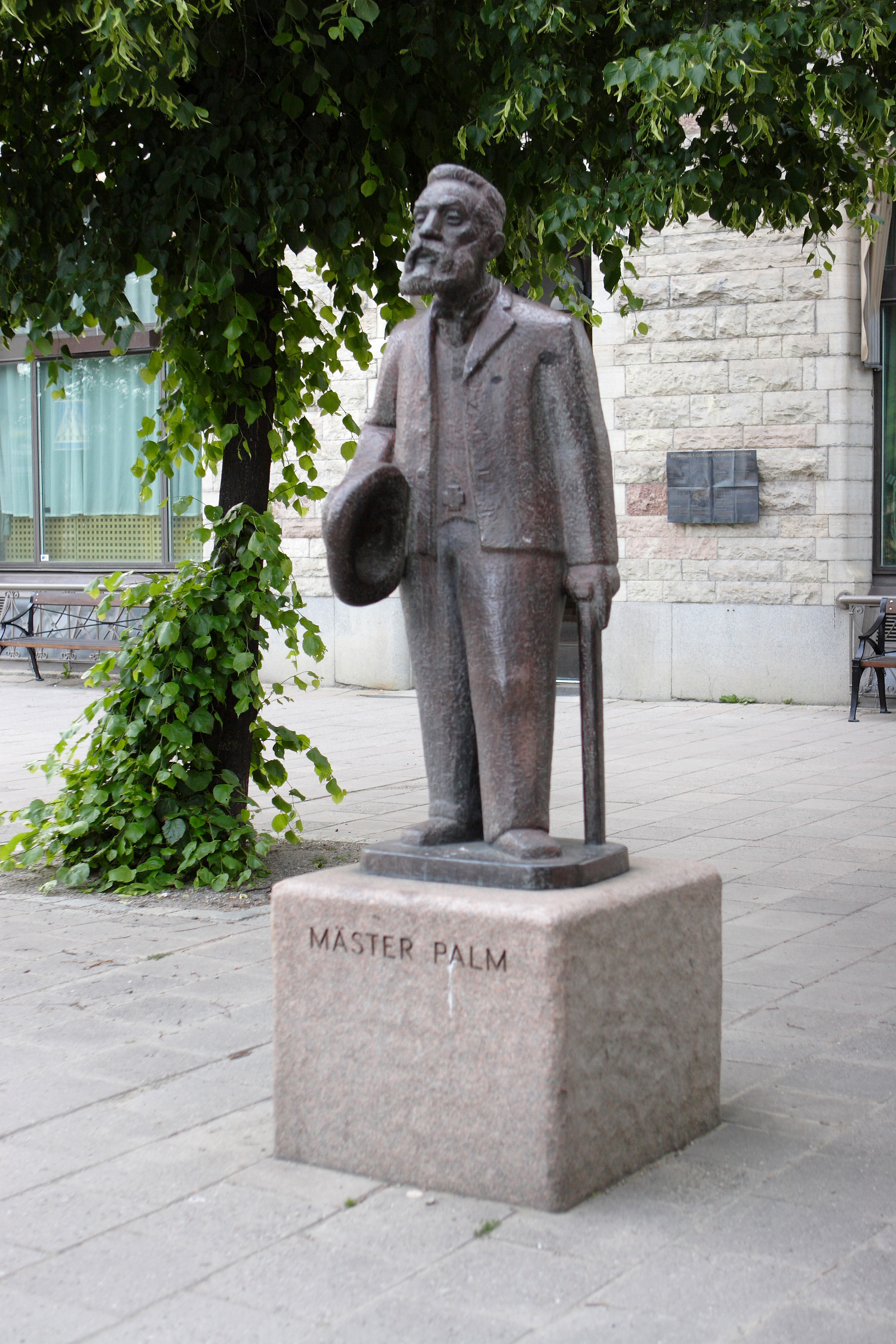
Statue of August Palm at Norra Bantorget, Stockholm

A journalist visiting the 1896 session of the Folkriksdag described the scene vividly in Dagens Nyheter: the red-bearded schoolteacher Sundblad from Sorunda was "one of the most prominent among the younger [radicals]," seated alongside Hjalmar Branting, Axel Danielsson, and August Palm — three founding figures of Swedish social democracy — all of whom "appeared to be in excellent humor." The 146 delegates, drawn from across Swedish society — editors, freeholders, shoemakers, carpenters, tailors, and four sitting Riksdag members — were described as "remarkably good-natured." Sundblad was elected to the First Committee, responsible for the organization of the suffrage movement, the structure of the Folkriksdag, and agitation, alongside Riksdag member Anton Hahn of Örebro and delegates from across the country. The session was chaired by David Bergström, Sundblad's colleague on the Swedish Peace and Arbitration Society's central board.

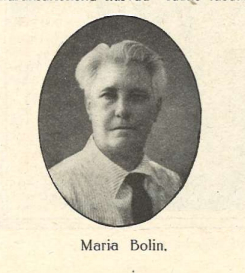
Maria Bolin, 1917

Sundblad continued to link suffrage with peace activism in the decades that followed. In June 1911 he spoke at a midsummer peace and suffrage meeting in Rönninge alongside suffragist Maria Bolin, who addressed the question of women's political enfranchisement. In April 1915 he delivered a peace lecture at a joint meeting organized with the Rönninge–Tumba Women's Suffrage Association, Stockholm County, chaired by Bolin.

== Writing and editing ==
The following list is drawn from the National Library of Sweden's catalog (LIBRIS), the back matter of Fridens härold (1892), and Nobel Peace Prize nomination records. Several works were published under three pseudonyms: Amicus Veritatis (Friend of Truth), Amicus gentium (Friend of Nations), and Harald Svenske (Harold the Swede).

=== Books and pamphlets ===
- 1885 – Vilddjuret: den falske profeten och skökan (The Wild Beast: the False Prophet and the Whore; as Amicus Veritatis)
- 1885 – Skola jordens folk någonsin upphöra att föra krig? (Will the peoples of the earth ever cease to make war?; as Amicus Veritatis; later condemned as heretical at a mission meeting in Stockholm)
- 1886 – Kristliga brodermord (Christian fratricide)
- 1887 – Kristlig fredskatekes i fem hufvudstycken (Christian peace catechism in five main parts)
- 1887 – Fredskatekes (Peace catechism; praised in Fredsvännen as "among the best writings in our language on the peace idea")
- 1889 – Obesvarade frågor (Unanswered questions; as Amicus Veritatis; expanded ed. 1892)
- 1890 – Vilddjuret… (2nd enlarged edition)
- 1892 – Fridens härold: fredssånger (Herald of Peace: peace songs; with J. M. Omberg)
- 1895 – Hvaför bilda vi fredsföreningar? (Why do we form peace associations?)
- 1897 – Bakom kulisserna eller huru norrmännen kommo med på utställningen i Stockholm 1897 (Behind the scenes, or how the Norwegians came to participate in the Stockholm Exhibition of 1897)
- 1898 – Fredrik Bajer, Krigsorsaker och skiljedomsmål i Europa (Causes of war and arbitration issues in Europe; translated by Sundblad)
- 1901 – Huru få vi ett betryggande försvar? (How do we obtain reliable defence?)
- 1901 – Ett lyckligt samhälle, fattigdomens afskaffande (A happy society: the abolition of poverty)
- 1903 – Svenska fredsrörelsens historia (History of the Swedish peace movement), vol. I (Åren 1883–1903).

Note: This volume provoked a heated debate in the Riksdag in 1904 regarding government funding for the Society. Opponents of the funding read passages aloud in which Sundblad had criticised the Riksdag for lacking "intelligence, knowledge, foresight and political talent," and cited what they regarded as a self-laudatory account of his own role in the 1895 Swedish–Norwegian crisis. The funding proposal nevertheless passed narrowly, by 95 votes to 93.

- 1904 – Svenska fredsrörelsens historia, vol. II (Åren 1883–1903)
- 1907 – Den nya fredskatekesen (The new peace catechism)
- 1912 – Svar på Sven Hedins varningsord (Answer to Sven Hedin's words of warning; as Harald Svenske) :Note: A direct rebuttal to Sven Hedin's 1912 militarist pamphlet Ett varningsord, which presaged the Swedish Defence Struggle of 1914.
- 1913 – En saga om fredsåren och krigsgetterna i landet Slagsmåla (A tale of the years of peace and the war-goats in the land of Slagsmåla; as Harald Svenske)
- 1914 – Huru luftens herrar avskaffade kriget (How the lords of the air abolished war; as Amicus gentium)
- 1915 – Front mot kriget (Front against war)
- 1916 – Fredsmonumentet på norsk-svenska gränsen (The peace monument on the Norwegian-Swedish border)
- 1916 – Huru skola vi undvika framtida krig? (How shall we avoid future wars?)
- 1918 – Bolsjevikerna: falska fredsprofeter (The Bolsheviks: false peace prophets)
- 1918 – Det svenska fredsarbetet 1883–1918 (Swedish peace work 1883–1918)
- 1919 – Svenska fredsrörelsens historia, vol. III (Åren 1904–1919)
- 1919 – Nationernas förbund (The League of Nations)
- 1922 – Gud Fader och världsnöden (God the Father and the world's distress)
- 1924 – Minnesskrift med anledning av 110-årig fred i Norden samt fredsmonumentets tioårsjubileum (Memorial publication on the occasion of 110 years of peace in the Nordic countries and the tenth anniversary of the peace monument)
- 1927 – Den folkliga fredsrörelsen och dess belackare (The popular peace movement and its detractors)
- 1929 – Fredsmonumentet ... (revised edition)
- 1931 – Renad kristendom och fred (Purified Christianity and peace)

=== Journals edited ===
- Ned med vapnen (Down with Arms), edited 1893–1897
- Fredsfanan (Peace Flag), edited 1898–1904; continued until 1922.

Note: Around 1900 an article Sundblad published in Fredsfanan describing the Russification of Finland as a positive development in world progress drew protests from members of the Society's central board. Peace activist and suffragist Emilia Broomé, then a board member, was among those who objected and subsequently resigned from the board, redirecting her peace work to Sveriges Kvinnliga Fredsförening (Swedish Women's Peace Organization).

=== Gramophone recordings ===
Sundblad contributed spoken recordings to the PAX gramophone record series with Carl Lindhagen and other peace advocates.

== Politics ==
=== Parliamentary candidacy ===
In the Södertörn constituency during the 1890 Riksdag election, Sundblad stood for a seat representing Södertörn as an independent liberal candidate opposing protective tariffs. He was nominated at a meeting organized by the Ösmo Peace Society, winning the nomination against K. P. Arnoldson. In the election he received 219 votes, finishing third behind August Pettersson (283 votes), who took the single seat, and Lars Petter Larsson (221 votes).

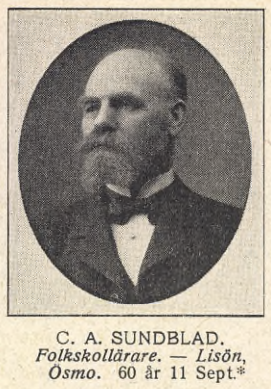
Carl Sundblad, age 60 (1909)

In August 1908, at a meeting of liberal voters held at the mission house in Gudby, Sorunda, attended by about 300 people, Sundblad and L. P. Larsson both declined nominations; farmer E. Andersson of Tungelsta was unanimously elected as the district's candidate. The meeting also heard a speech on women's suffrage by Anna Kleman of Stockholm.

Sundblad did not seek election to the Riksdag again, but remained active in liberal politics through Frisinnade landsföreningen (Free-minded National Association) and its parliamentary wing the Liberal Coalition Party, whose defining causes were suffrage, constitutional reform, temperance, and religious freedom.

=== Local politics ===
Sundblad remained active in local politics in Salem Municipality after his retirement from teaching, serving on the municipal appeals committee and the parliamentary election committee from 1911. In May 1911 he was made an alternate delegate of the local chapter of the Free-minded National Association. He was elected to the Salem municipal council in 1918, to the Rönninge municipal board as an alternate member in 1925, and as a full member from 1927.

== Personal life ==
Carl Sundblad married Sofia Charlotta ("Lotten") Pettersson (1857–1939) in 1876. She was a trained teacher born in Tyresö, the daughter of homestead owner Anders Peter Pettersson and Eva Lotta Westerberg. The couple had six children: Karl Julius (1877–1930), Bror Georg (1879–1953), Filip Arvid Justus (1881–1946), Syster Julia Charlotta (1883–1959), Signe Sofia (1885–1905), and Knut Fritjof Valdemar (1887–1915). The Sundblads also had a foster son, Hjalmar Daniel Hagström (1893–1982).

The family suffered two early losses: Signe Sofia died in Sorunda in 1905 at the age of twenty, and Knut Fritjof Valdemar, a first mate on the steamship Bylgia, died in 1915 aged twenty-seven. Of the four surviving biological children, Bror Georg worked as a forest ranger, constable, and health inspector; Filip Arvid Justus became an elementary school teacher; Julia Charlotta worked as a shop assistant; and Karl Julius worked at a printing company. Hjalmar Daniel also became an elementary school teacher.

== Recognitions and honors ==
=== State honors ===
- Knight of the Order of Vasa, 1932.

=== Societal honors ===
- Honorary chairman, Swedish Peace and Arbitration Society, 1924–1933
- Honorary member, Södertörn Teachers' Association, 1920–1927
- Honorary member, Stockholm Southern Peace Association, 1931

=== Nobel Peace Prize nominations ===
Sundblad received thirteen nominations for the Nobel Peace Prize between 1913 and 1933. His first two nominations (1913–1914) were submitted by the Norwegian parliamentarian and Nobel Committee member Cornelius Bernhard Hanssen. Further nominations followed from Swedish peace activists, members of the Riksdag, and other public figures, including Nils August Nilsson in 1915 and Alexius Björkman in 1918.

== Death and legacy ==
Sundblad was still active in the peace movement just months before his death. On 1 July 1933 he spoke at the Society's 50th anniversary public meeting held in the grand ceremonial hall of Stockholm City Hall. The following day he spoke at the unveiling of a memorial stone for the Society's founder Klas Pontus Arnoldson at Norra kyrkogården (Northern Cemetery), Stockholm — one of his last public appearances.

Sundblad died at his home in Rönninge on 4 December 1933, aged 84, after a month of illness. His obituary in Svensk Läraretidning described him as "one of the oldest champions of the peace cause." He was survived by his wife, three children, his foster son, and six grandchildren. At his funeral at Salem Church, wreaths were laid by the Swedish Peace and Arbitration Society, the Stockholm Peace Society, and the communities of Sorunda and Rönninge. Some forty former pupils also attended, reflecting both his decades of peace work and his deep roots in the local community.

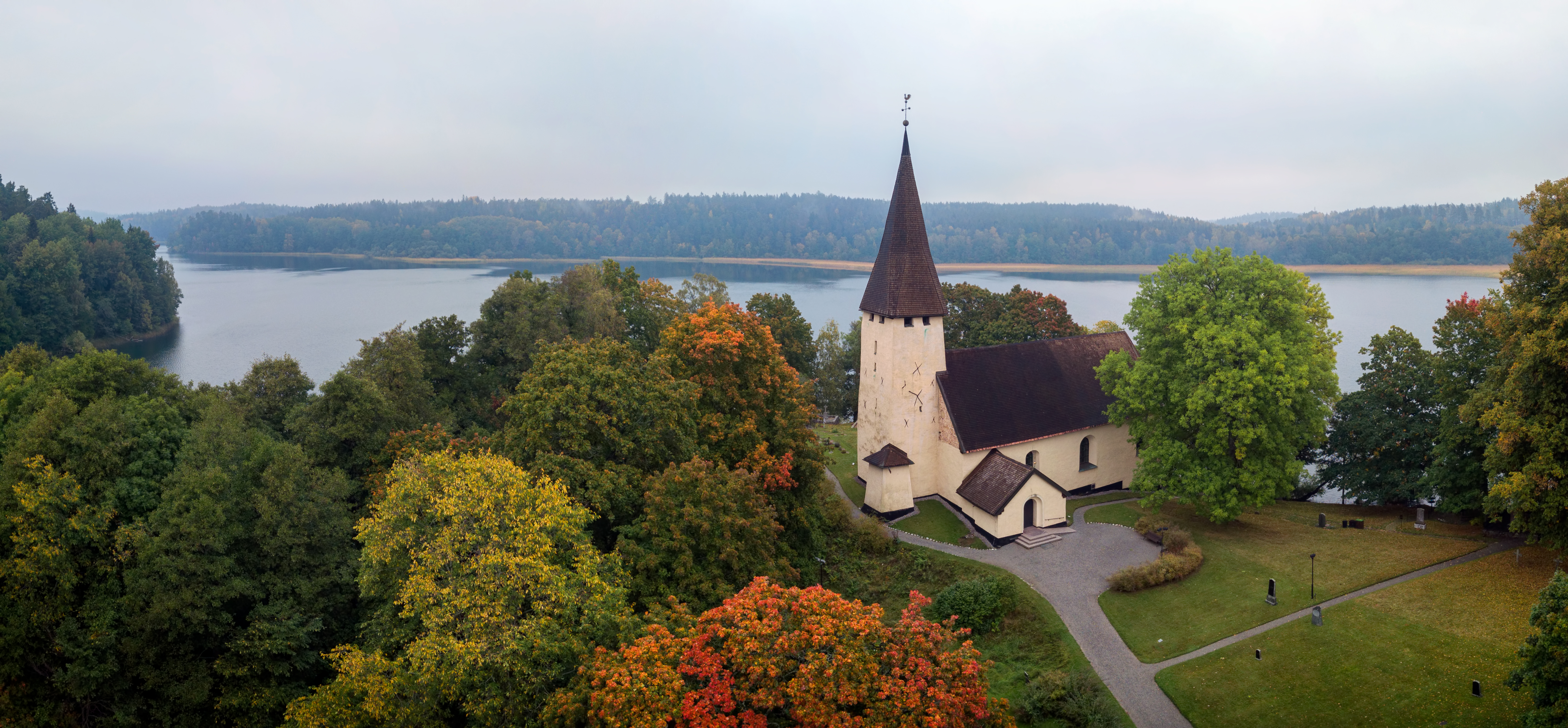
Salem Church

He is buried at Säby begravningsplats (burial ground) in Salem. His gravestone, erected by the Swedish Peace and Arbitration Society, bears the inscription Sveriges fredsapostel (Sweden's Peace Apostle). He is buried near his wife, his daughter Signe, and his son Knut.

Sundblad's career spanned five decades of organized pacifism in Sweden. As chairman, vice chairman, and ultimately honorary chairman of the Swedish Peace and Arbitration Society, he played a central role in the Society's development and public outreach. His multi-volume Svenska fredsrörelsens historia remains an early documentary record of Scandinavian organized pacifism, and the peace monument at Morokulien is a surviving physical marker of the Nordic peace movement he helped build.

== Bibliography ==
- Andra kammarens protokoll 1904, N:o 15. Stockholm: Sveriges riksdag. 13 February 1904.
- Andréasson, Pascal (2021). Den vite generalen: Baptistpastorn Albert Wickmans kamp för fred (PDF) (Magisteruppsats) (in Swedish). Umeå universitet.
- Arnoldson, Torild W. (November 1912). "Sweden's Attitude Toward Russia". The Advocate of Peace (1894–1920). 74 (10): 246–247.
- "The first transboundary protected area". Convention on Biological Diversity.
- "Valrörelsen i Södertörn". Dagens Nyheter (in Swedish). 1 July 1890. p. 1. KB Tidningar
- "I rösträtts- och fredsfrågorna". Dagens Nyheter (in Swedish). 4 July 1892. p. 2. KB Tidningar
- "För folkriksdagen". Dagens Nyheter (in Swedish). 30 July 1892. p. 2. KB Tidningar
- "Förberedelserna till folkriksdagen". Dagens Nyheter (in Swedish). 5 December 1892. p. 2. KB Tidningar
- "Kandidatlistor". Dagens Nyheter (in Swedish). 21 December 1892. p. 2. KB Tidningar
- "Svenska freds- och skiljedomsföreningens centralstyrelse". Dagens Nyheter (in Swedish). 6 December 1895. p. 2. KB Tidningar
- "Folkriksdagen". Dagens Nyheter (in Swedish). 16 May 1896. p. 2. KB Tidningar
- "En visit hos folkriksdagen". Dagens Nyheter (in Swedish). 16 May 1896. p. 3. KB Tidningar
- "Fredskongressen i Skien". Dagens Nyheter (in Swedish). 26 July 1901. p. 2. KB Tidningar
- "Fredsföreningen hyllar sin missionsföreståndare". Dagens Nyheter (in Swedish). 10 January 1907. p. 2. KB Tidningar
- "Sammankomster: Svenska fredsföreningens 25 års-jubileum". Dagens Nyheter (in Swedish). 4 April 1908. p. 3. KB Tidningar
- "Kandidatfrågan klar i Sotholm och Öknebo". Dagens Nyheter (in Swedish). 11 August 1908. p. 3. KB Tidningar
- "Två Nobelfester". Dagens Nyheter (in Swedish). 11 December 1909. p. 3. KB Tidningar
- "Personalnotiser". Dagens Nyheter (in Swedish). 7 January 1910. p. 6. KB Tidningar
- "Fredsvännerna vinna anhängare i Trollhättan". Dagens Nyheter (in Swedish). 20 June 1910. p. 8. KB Tidningar
- "Nordiska fredsmötet". Dagens Nyheter (in Swedish). 31 July 1910. p. 7. KB Tidningar
- "Nyheter från Stockholms län". Dagens Nyheter (in Swedish). 13 March 1911. p. 6. KB Tidningar
- "Nyheter från Stockholms län". Dagens Nyheter (in Swedish). 1 May 1911. p. 4. KB Tidningar
- "Stockholms-Nyheter". Dagens Nyheter (in Swedish). 21 June 1911. p. 3. KB Tidningar
- "Stockholms-Nyheter". Dagens Nyheter (in Swedish). 26 June 1911. p. 3. KB Tidningar
- "Freds- och skiljedomsföreningen hos kungen". Dagens Nyheter (in Swedish). 15 August 1912. p. 5. KB Tidningar
- "Fredsmonumentet mellan Sverige och Norge". Dagens Nyheter (in Swedish). 31 January 1913. p. 1. KB Tidningar
- "Olycklig kärlek drev honom i döden". Dagens Nyheter (in Swedish). 24 January 1915. p. 9. KB Tidningar
- "Dödsannons: Knut Sundblad". Dagens Nyheter (in Swedish). 29 January 1915. p. 2. KB Tidningar
- "Fredspastorns värnpliktsvägran inför k. m:t". Dagens Nyheter (in Swedish). 19 February 1915. p. 9. KB Tidningar
- "Rönninge-Tumba kvinnliga rösträttsförening". Dagens Nyheter (in Swedish). 26 April 1915. p. 6. KB Tidningar
- "Freds- och skiljedomsföreningen hos statsministern". Dagens Nyheter (in Swedish). 18 July 1915. p. 3. KB Tidningar
- "Skandinaviska fredskongressen öppnad". Dagens Nyheter (in Swedish). 11 June 1916. p. 5. KB Tidningar
- "Ungsocialisternas amnestianökan". Dagens Nyheter (in Swedish). 22 November 1916. p. 4. KB Tidningar
- "Första svenska fredsmotionärens minne". Dagens Nyheter (in Swedish). 14 May 1917. p. 10. KB Tidningar
- "Nordisk fredskongress i Kristiania". Dagens Nyheter (in Swedish). 9 September 1917. p. 7. KB Tidningar
- "Fredsmötet i Stockholm i sommar". Dagens Nyheter (in Swedish). 22 May 1919. p. 4. KB Tidningar
- "Personalnotiser". Dagens Nyheter (in Swedish). 12 September 1919. p. 11. KB Tidningar
- "Personalnotiser". Dagens Nyheter (in Swedish). 28 March 1920. p. 8. KB Tidningar
- "Nåd åt ytterligare två värnpliktsvägrare". Dagens Nyheter (in Swedish). 29 August 1920. p. 5. KB Tidningar
- "Nåd åt värnpliktig". Dagens Nyheter (in Swedish). 31 December 1920. p. 9. KB Tidningar
- "Svenska fredsföreningens kongress". Dagens Nyheter (in Swedish). 26 June 1921. p. 7. KB Tidningar
- "Carl Sundblad 75 år". Dagens Nyheter (in Swedish). 11 September 1924. p. 8. KB Tidningar
- "Stockholms grannkommuner". Dagens Nyheter (in Swedish). 30 December 1925. p. 5. KB Tidningar
- "Dödsfall". Dagens Nyheter (in Swedish). 13 April 1930. p. 2. KB Tidningar
- "Ny lokalavdelning av Freds- och skiljedomsföreningen". Dagens Nyheter (in Swedish). 11 May 1931. p. 4. KB Tidningar
- "Sundblad fann kungen förstådig". Dagens Nyheter (in Swedish). 24 February 1933. pp. 1, 7. KB Tidningar
- "Svenska Freds- och Skiljedomsföreningens 50-årsjubileum". Dagens Nyheter (in Swedish). 1 April 1933. p. 18. KB Tidningar
- "Freds- och skiljedomsföreningens 50-årsjubileum". Dagens Nyheter (in Swedish). 3 April 1933. p. 7. KB Tidningar
- "Freds- och skiljedomsföreningens 50-årsjubileum". Dagens Nyheter (in Swedish). 29 June 1933. p. 10. KB Tidningar
- "Svenska Freds- och Skiljedomsföreningens 50-års-jubileum". Dagens Nyheter (in Swedish). 30 June 1933. p. 23. KB Tidningar
- "Dödsfall". Dagens Nyheter (in Swedish). 6 December 1933. p. 20. KB Tidningar
- "Dödsannons: Carl A. Sundblad". Dagens Nyheter (in Swedish). 6 December 1933. p. 2. KB Tidningar
- "Jordfästningar". Dagens Nyheter (in Swedish). 11 December 1933. p. 4. KB Tidningar
- "Jordfästningar". Dagens Nyheter (in Swedish). 30 January 1946. p. 20. KB Tidningar
- "Dödsfall". Dagens Nyheter (in Swedish). 3 March 1953. p. 15. KB Tidningar
- "Anniversary at Wreta School". Nynäshamns kommun / Digitalt Museum.
- "Entry for Carl Anders Sundblad and Sofia Charlotta Pettersson, 1906–1914". Sweden, Household Examination Books, 1874–1931. FamilySearch.
- "Fredsplatsen Morokulien Historia". Fredsmonumentet.
- "Generationsskifte i Morokulien". Fredsplatsens Vänner. 2009.
- Grundel, Arvid (September 1910). "Sweden and the Peace Movement". The Advocate of Peace (1894–1920). 72 (8): 196–197.
- "Veckans Porträttgalleri". Hvar 8 Dag (in Swedish). 26 September 1909. p. 783.
- "Fredsdeputationen från Varbergskongressen till statsministern". Hvar 8 Dag (in Swedish). No. 44. 1 August 1915. p. 700.
- Jenlund, Sven (1986). SFV/RKF 1883–1983: jubileumsskrift. Årsböcker i svensk undervisningshistoria. Vol. 159. Stockholm: Föreningen för svensk undervisningshistoria.
- Kämpe, Alfred (1920). Svenska allmogens frihetsstrider. Vol. III. Stockholm.
- Lindhagen, Carl (1916). Motioner i Andra kammaren, Nr 219: om skrivelse till Kungl. Maj:t angående svenskt eller skandinaviskt regeringsinitiativ till sammankallande av en fredskonferens av neutrala stater. Stockholm: Sveriges riksdag.
- Lindhagen, Carl (1927). Motioner i Första kammaren, Nr 196: om en allmän revision av folkförbundets akt. Stockholm: Sveriges riksdag.
- Melin, Inga-Brita (2004). Lysistrates döttrar: Pionjärer och pedagoger i två kvinnliga fredsorganisationer (1898–1937) (PDF) (PhD thesis) (in Swedish). Umeå University.
- "Carl Sundblad – Nobel Peace Prize nominations". Nobel Prize Outreach.
- "Jørgen Gunnarson Løvland". Norwegian Social Science Data Service. 2016.
- "Household census, Sorunda parish, 1890". Riksarkivet.
- "Census 1910, Salem parish — entry for Hagström, Hjalmar Daniel (foster son in household of Carl Anders Sundblad)". Riksarkivet.
- "Hagström, Hjalmar Daniel — Folkräkningar (Sveriges befolkning) 1930". Riksarkivet.
- Riksförbundet Kristen Fostran (2024). "Om RKF". Riksförbundet Kristen Fostran (in Swedish).
- Rodell, Magnus (2010). "Monumentet på gränsen: Om den rumsliga vändningen och ett fredsmonument" (PDF). Scandia (in Swedish). 74 (2): 15–51.
- Rönblom, Hans-Krister (1929). Frisinnade landsföreningen 1902–1927: Skildringar ur den liberala organisationsrörelsens historia i vårt land. Stockholm: Saxon & Lindströms Förlags A.-B.
- "Gravsten #96318 — Carl Anders Sundblad". Rötter / Sveriges Släktforskarförbund.
- "Carl Sundblad, 1893–1933 (SE/SSA/3874)". Stockholms stadsarkiv / Riksarkivet.
- Sundblad, Carl (1892). Fridens härold: fredssånger. Första häftet (PDF). Sorunda: Carl Sundblads förlag.
- Sundblad, Carl (1903). Svenska fredsrörelsens historia åren 1883–1903. Stockholm: Svenska freds- och skiljedomsföreningen.
- Sundblad, Carl (1918). Det svenska fredsarbetet 1883–1918. Stockholm: Svenska freds- och skiljedomsföreningens förlag.
- "Carl Sundblad". Svensk Läraretidning (in Swedish). 13 December 1933. p. 1238.
- "Vår historia" (in Swedish). Svenska Freds- och Skiljedomsföreningen.
- "Fredsfanan. Organ för Svenska Freds- och Skiljedomsföreningen" (in Swedish). Kungliga biblioteket / Sveperlit.
- Swatuk, Larry A. (2019). "Confronting the Elephant in the Room: Peace Parks in Theory and Practice". Routledge Handbook of Environmental Security. Routledge. ISBN 9781138092297.
- "All litteratur". Tidevarvet (in Swedish). Vol. 12, no. 9. 3 March 1934. p. 2.
- Tornbjer, Charlotte (2002). Den nationella modern: moderskap i konstruktioner av svensk nationell gemenskap under 1900-talets första hälft (in Swedish). Lund.
- Tvåkammarriksdagen 1867–1970. Vol. 1. Stockholm: Almqvist & Wiksell International. 1988.
- Vem är det?: Svensk biografisk handbok. Stockholm: Norstedt. 1933.
