= Eda–Eidskog police station =

Joint Norwegian–Swedish police station located on the border between Eda and Eidskog

- Eda–Eidskog politistasjon (Norwegian); Eda–Eidskog polisstation (Swedish)
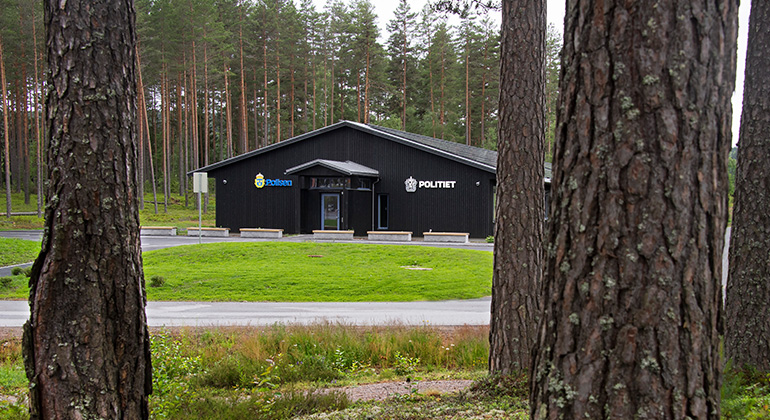
- The Eda–Eidskog police station at Morokulien

General information
- Type: Police station
- Location: Eda–Magnor border crossing, Norway–Sweden border
- Coordinates: 59.930399°N 12.239201°E
- Opened: 10 September 2025
- Owner: Norwegian Police Service; Swedish Police Authority

Eda–Eidskog police station is a joint Norwegian–Swedish police station located on the Norway–Sweden border. It is the first permanently co-located police station shared by the two countries.

== Location and name ==
The station is situated in Morokulien, a symbolic cross-border park between Eda in Sweden and Eidskog in Norway. The building spans the border line, which is marked on the floor inside the facility.

Its operational names are Eda–Eidskog politistasjon in Norwegian and Eda–Eidskog polisstation in Swedish. The station is reached from an access road that crosses the border, known as Fredsvegen on the Norwegian side and Fredsgatan on the Swedish side. It stands immediately south‑west of the Morokulien Infocenter.

== Development and inauguration ==
Cooperation between Norwegian and Swedish police and customs authorities has existed for many years, but planning for a permanent shared station began before 2017. A temporary joint station opened in 2022, and construction of the permanent building began in May 2024. The permanent station was designed as a 1,250 m^{2} (13,500 sq ft) facility and allows Norwegian and Swedish officers to work side by side in shared operational rooms. The completed building was handed over to the police in May 2025.

The station was officially opened on 10 September 2025 by Haakon, Crown Prince of Norway and Victoria, Crown Princess of Sweden. The ceremony included speeches by the justice ministers of both countries, police chiefs, and local officials, followed by a tour of the building and a demonstration of drone‑based policing technology.

== Purpose and role ==
The station was created to strengthen cooperation against cross‑border and organized crime. It supports joint patrols, shared intelligence work, and coordinated investigations under the Prüm framework. Swedish authorities emphasize its role in combating organized criminal networks, narcotics trafficking, weapons offenses, and vehicle theft affecting both countries. It does not handle ordinary criminal cases and does not maintain regular public opening hours.

== Comparable cross‑border police facilities ==
Two other locations in Europe have a facility for joint or cross‑border policing arrangements.

- the Baarle-Hertog / Baarle-Nassau enclave zone, where Belgian and Dutch officers operate from a shared police station in Baarle-Hertog under the Benelux Police Treaty
- the tri‑national policing and customs cooperation framework at EuroAirport Basel–Mulhouse–Freiburg (France–Switzerland–Germany) in Saint-Louis, France, which supports coordinated law‑enforcement activity across the region

== Bibliography ==
- Tony Verachtert (2024). "The new Benelux Treaty on police cooperation" (PDF). European Crime Prevention Network.
- Länsstyrelsen Värmland (2025-09-02). "H.K.H. Kronprinsessan Victoria och H.K.H. Kronprins Haakon inviger svensk-norsk polisstation". County Administrative Board of Värmland (in Swedish).
- Mannberg, Karin (2025-09-10). "Nu är den unika polisstationen på gränsen mellan Sverige och Norge invigd". SVT Nyheter (in Swedish).
- Mo, Ann-Kristin; Bækkelien, Stine; Ingvaldsen, Sigrid Grøndalen (2025-09-10). "Politistasjon på grensa: Nå jobber Norge og Sverige under samme tak". NRK (in Norwegian).
- Regjeringen (2025-09-02). "Justisministeren markerer opninga av norsk-svensk politistasjon". Government of Norway (in Norwegian).
- Statsforvalteren i Innlandet (2025-09-02). "H.K.H. Kronprins Haakon og H.K.H. Kronprinsesse Victoria innvier norsk-svensk politistasjon". Statsforvalteren i Innlandet (in Norwegian).
- Swedish Police Authority (2025-09-10). "Enad front på gränsen – ny polisstation invigd". Swedish Police Authority (in Swedish).
- Norwegian Police Service (2025-09-11). "Høytidelig åpning av Eda–Eidskog politistasjon". Norwegian Police Service (in Norwegian). Archived from the original on 2026-01-22.
- Eda kommun. "Polisstation vid Morokulien". Eda kommun (in Swedish).
- Rambøll (2022-09-05). Naturvärdesinventering Magnormoen (PDF) (Report) (in Swedish). Statsbygg.
- Pål Jonson (2017-12-01). "Skriftlig fråga 2017/18:372 – En svensk-norsk polisstation i Morokulien". Sveriges riksdag (in Swedish).
- Eidskog kommune (2023-02-14). "Sluttbehandling – Detaljregulering for Politistasjon ved Morokulien" (PDF). Eidskog kommune (in Norwegian).
