= Knut Sandstedt =

Swedish peace activist (1858–1944)

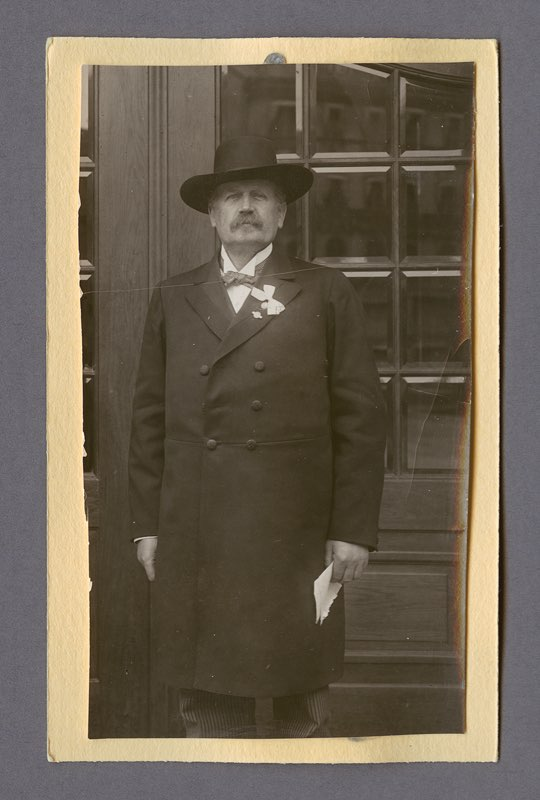
- Sandstedt c. 1930
- Born: March 24, 1858; Börstils parish, Uppsala County, Sweden
- Died: March 3, 1944 (aged 85); Stockholm, Sweden
- Resting place: Solna Cemetery, Solna, Sweden
- Occupations: City registrar and census commissioner
- Movement: Peace, animal welfare, separation of church and state
- Spouse: Charlotta ("Lotten") Sofia Wilhelmina Widell (m. 1881)
- Children: 5
- Parent(s): Anders Fredriksson Sandstedt; Kristina Ersdotter Granbom
- Honors: Sweden's Medal for Civic Merit (GMmf5)

Knut Gabriel Sandstedt (24 March 1858 – 3 March 1944) was a Swedish civil servant, peace activist, editor, and a principal leader of several peace societies, including the Swedish Peace and Arbitration Society. He was awarded Sweden's Medal for Civic Merit and nominated four times for the Nobel Peace Prize.

As part of the peace movement he was a delegate to international peace congresses across Europe and served as secretary of the committee responsible for the Morokulien peace monument on the Swedish–Norwegian border, inaugurated in 1914.

Beyond peace work, he was active in Nordic animal‑welfare societies, championed separation of church and state, and argued that a universal language would advance the cause of peace.

== Early life and career ==
Knut Gabriel Sandstedt was born on 24 March 1858 in Börstils parish, Uppsala County, Sweden, the son of Anders Fredriksson Sandstedt and Kristina Ersdotter. He grew up in Börstil, where his father served as a parish constable (fjärdingsman).

Sandstedt passed the upper‑secondary school exam (mogenhetsexamen) in 1877. He entered public service the following year, becoming a clerk (kanslist) in 1878 at the Office of the Governor of Stockholm (Överståthållarämbetet). In 1890 he was appointed recorder of population statistics (roteman) and census commissioner (mantalskommissarie) for the 8th ward in Stockholm, posts he held until his retirement in 1923.

== Peace activism ==
=== Stockholm Peace Association ===
Sandstedt was a central figure in the Stockholm Peace Association (Stockholms fredsförening), founded in 1885 as a local branch of the national Swedish Peace and Arbitration Society (Svenska Freds- och Skiljedomsföreningen) and still active today. Sandstedt ran much of its daily work from his office in downtown Stockholm, managing correspondence, membership records, and the distribution of peace literature. He served as chairman from 1896 to 1923 and later as honorary chairman. In 1925 he edited the book Minnesskrift vid Stockholms fredsförenings fyratioårsfest (Commemorative Volume for the Stockholm Peace Association's Fortieth Anniversary).

=== Swedish Peace and Arbitration Society ===
Sandstedt became a principal leader of the Swedish Peace and Arbitration Society, the world's oldest still-active peace organization, founded in 1883 by Nobel Peace Prize laureate Klas Pontus Arnoldson. He served the Society for approximately three decades in multiple national offices, including treasurer, secretary, vice chairman, and acting chairman in its central board. From around 1908 he was identified alongside the teacher Carl Sundblad as one of the Society's two principal leaders. He was made an honorary life member of the Society.

Sandstedt co-edited the Society's journal Fredsfanan (The Peace Flag) with Carl Sundblad. He organized numerous peace congresses within Sweden between 1902 and 1922 and represented the Society at international peace congresses across Europe, including in Stockholm (1910), Geneva (1912), The Hague (1913), Basel (1921), London (1922), Basel (1923), Berlin (1924), Paris (1925), and Geneva (1926).

==== Peace Monument Bureau ====
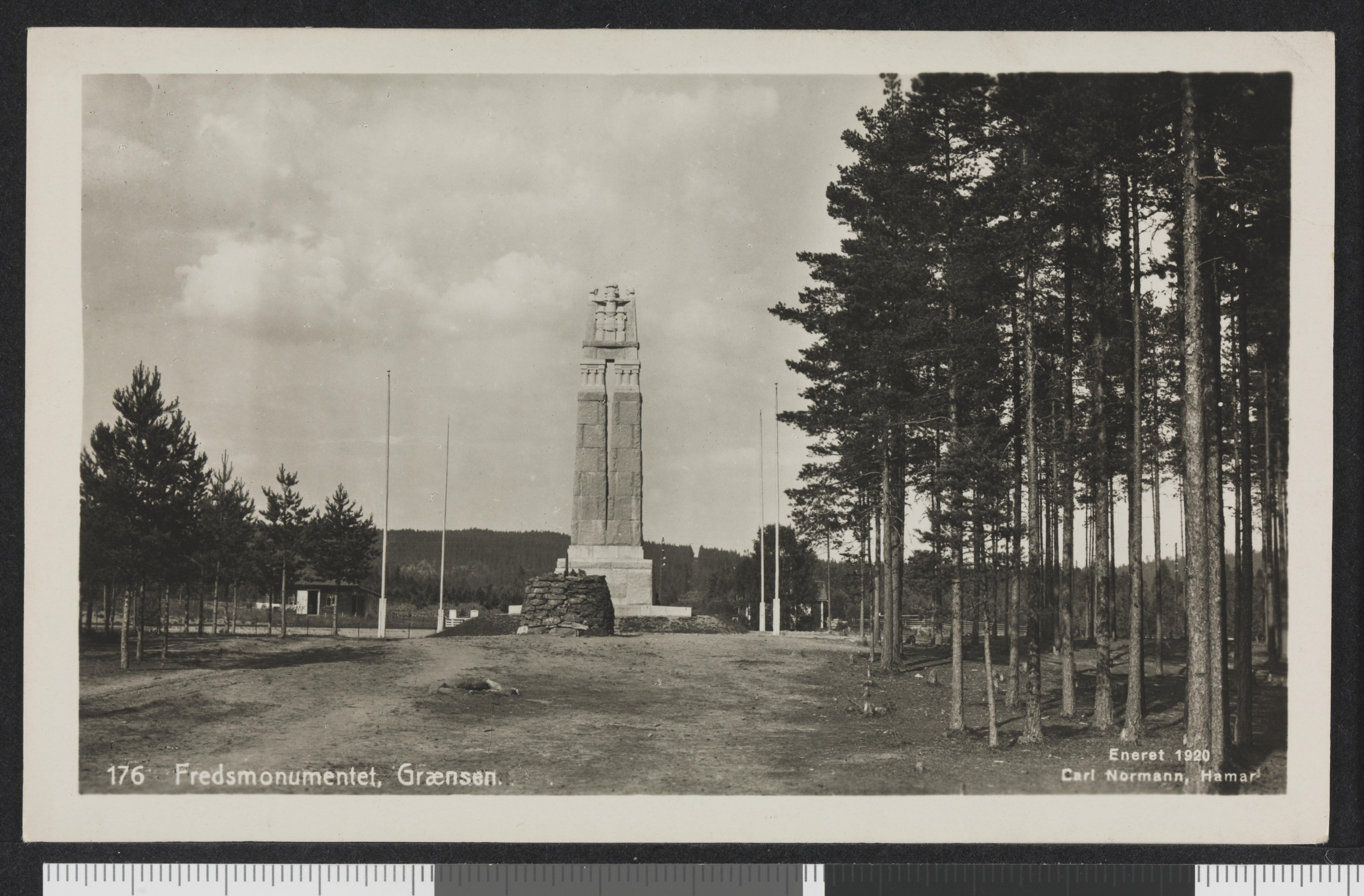
The peace monument at the Swedish–Norwegian border.

From 1913, Sandstedt served as secretary of the Peace Monument Bureau (Fredsmonumentets byrå), responsible for the fundraising and administration of the peace monument on the border between Eda Municipality (Sweden) and Magnor (Norway) in the transborder park now called Morokulien. The bureau was established at the Swedish Peace and Arbitration Society's offices by a joint working committee whose members included Carl Sundblad, Emil Larsson, J. L. Saxon, the sculptor Carl Eldh, and the women's suffrage leader Ann Margret Holmgren. It was erected jointly by the Swedish Peace and Arbitration Society and Norway's Peace League to mark the centenary of peaceful relations between Sweden and Norway, and was inaugurated on 16 August 1914.

=== Northern Peace Federation ===
Sandstedt was a co‑founder of the Northern Peace Federation (Nordiska fredsförbundet), established in 1918 to coordinate peace work across Sweden, Norway, and Denmark in the aftermath of World War I. The federation functioned as a Nordic umbrella organization, with one national branch in each country. Sandstedt served as General Secretary of its Northern Peace Congress, which convened a Nordic peace congress in Copenhagen on 1–2 July 1921.

==== Universal language ====
In 1920, Sandstedt conducted an international survey on behalf of the Northern Peace Federation, distributing a questionnaire to philologists at universities across several countries to determine which language — living or dead — would best serve as a shared medium for international correspondence, in support of the Federation's mission of fostering peace among nations. Of the 34 responses received, 26 favoured English and rejected constructed languages such as Esperanto, Ido, and Volapük; two proposed French, one German, one Latin, one Esperanto, and three Ido. Sandstedt endorsed the majority view, citing the 1907 pamphlet Zur Kritik der künstlichen Weltsprachen by Karl Brugmann and August Leskien, which argued that constructed languages, lacking native speakers and any literary tradition, could not match the organic richness of a living tongue already in worldwide use. The resolution he transmitted from the Northern Peace Congress in Copenhagen, held 1–2 July 1921, expressed the congress's view that English should be adopted as the world's international language on equal footing with each nation's own — with particular emphasis on winning over the smaller nations — while separately urging governments and the League of Nations to commission an independent inquiry, its findings to form the basis for introducing the recommended language into schools and colleges worldwide. Sandstedt and Emil Larsson continued to study the question for the Federation from its headquarters in Stocksund for several years thereafter.

=== Swedish World Peace Mission ===
In his later years Sandstedt was involved in more radical pacifism. He served as vice chairman of the Swedish World Peace Mission (Svenska Världsfredsmissionen), a Christian peace organization founded in 1919 when 875 members broke away from the Swedish Peace and Arbitration Society to focus on conscientious objection and opposition to Swedish arms exports. By 1932 the organization numbered approximately 4,500 members, affiliated with the War Resisters' International, and operated a "liberation fund" (frigörelsefonden) intended to help workers leave the armaments industry; similar funds were reported that year in Switzerland and France.

== Animal welfare ==
By the 1880s Sandstedt was involved in animal‑welfare movements, and remained active in them for the rest of his life. He also took an active interest in enforcing Stockholm's early animal‑protection laws; one such instance was reported in June 1910, when he intervened against a carter who had beaten a horse that had collapsed under a heavily loaded wagon on Kungsgatan, gathering witness statements on the spot and filing a complaint with the police.

=== Nordic Society for Combating Scientific Animal Cruelty ===
He was active in the Nordic Society for Combating Scientific Animal Cruelty, founded in 1882. He was serving as its secretary by January 1883, when he published the society's announcement of an essay competition on the moral problems of vivisection, and continued in that role through at least 1886, receiving membership applications on behalf of the national organization at his Stockholm address. The society did not seek to abolish vivisection but to restrict and regulate it by law, campaigning for mandatory anaesthesia, limits on experiments using higher mammals, and government oversight of research laboratories. Renamed Djurens Rätt in 1999, it is Sweden's principal anti‑vivisection society.

=== Swedish Vegetarian Society ===
Sandstedt was a long-time member of the Swedish Vegetarian Society, with involvement extending over more than four decades. He appeared at Society-related public events, including the 1909 celebration of Society founder J. L. Saxon's fiftieth birthday, where he delivered greetings on behalf of the Stockholm Peace Society. In 1910, at the annual meeting in Gothenburg, he was elected as the Society's financial auditor (revisor). At the Society's 1945 annual meeting in Danderyd, Sweden, a year after Sandstedt's death, a moment of silence was held in his memory.

== Religion in public schools ==
Under Swedish law of the period, Christian religious instruction (kristendomskunskap) in the public elementary schools was compulsory. Sandstedt challenged compulsory religious instruction in three ways: petitioning for his daughters' exemption, calling for public schools to be secular, and protesting the teaching of the Old Testament.

=== Religious exemptions ===
Between 1896 and 1909, Sandstedt petitioned various Stockholm school authorities at least six times to exempt his daughters from religious instruction, arguing that Christian instruction as conducted in the capital's public schools had a damaging effect on children's mental and spiritual development, and that as a matter of conscience he did not wish his children to be instructed in the Evangelical‑Lutheran faith. In each round, the school authority's legal adviser ruled that the petition could not be granted, because exemption under the Dissenter Law of 1877 was available only to children of parents belonging to a recognised non-Lutheran denomination; the Stockholm school board nonetheless voted to grant each of the petitions brought before it. His most consistent supporters on the board were the school physician, Stockholm Workers' Institute founder Anton Nyström, and the socialist agitator Hinke Bergegren; later rounds drew support from Hjalmar Branting, the future prime minister. The Diocese of Stockholm declared the 1902 exemption unlawful and formally revoked it in January 1903.

In November 1904, Sandstedt escalated the matter by petitioning King Oscar II directly. He argued that denying a conscience-based exemption effectively coerced him into leaving the state church, since joining any recognised non-Lutheran denomination would automatically secure the exemption he was being refused. Religious instruction, he wrote, already occupied a constitutionally special position under the Swedish monarch's obligation not to coerce anyone's conscience, and rejecting his application was tantamount to forcing him out of the established church.

The final petition for exemption was approved in March 1905, when the school board chairman cast his vote to break a 10–10 tie. During the debate, board member Carl Raab observed that Sandstedt was "a kind of Ishmael, whom every man — or in this case, every ecclesiastical authority — had set himself against, although he had committed no breach of the law."

=== Secular schools ===
Sandstedt's petitions on behalf of his own children ran alongside a public campaign for broader reform. In February 1905, he gave the introductory address at a meeting on public schools in Sundbyberg, Sweden, arguing that excessive emphasis on religious instruction had held back reform and that the first precondition for change was the separation of church and state; the meeting adopted a resolution calling on the Riksdag to take up reform urgently. Six years later, in February 1911, he delivered a similar introductory address at a Stockholm Workers' Institute discussion meeting on elementary schools, arguing that religious instruction should be removed from the public schools altogether and that religious education was better entrusted to the home and the church.

=== New Testament ===
In September 1938, Sandstedt co-signed a petition to King Gustaf V together with two fellow religious writers: Erik Bjuggren, a retired military officer, and mathematician Henrik Petrini. The petitioners argued that the Old and New Testaments were in substance "two distinct religions," and that binding them together in a single volume and teaching them as one scripture confused the moral lessons of Jesus. They urged that Christian religious instruction in Swedish schools should be based exclusively on the words and sayings of Jesus. Archbishop Erling Eidem responded the following month, declaring that their proposal would constitute "a manifest departure from the doctrine and faith of the Swedish Church," citing the 1593 Uppsala Synod and the 1686 Church Law — both of which define Swedish Lutheran doctrine as resting on the prophetic and apostolic writings of both testaments.

== Honors ==
=== Medal for Civic Merit ===
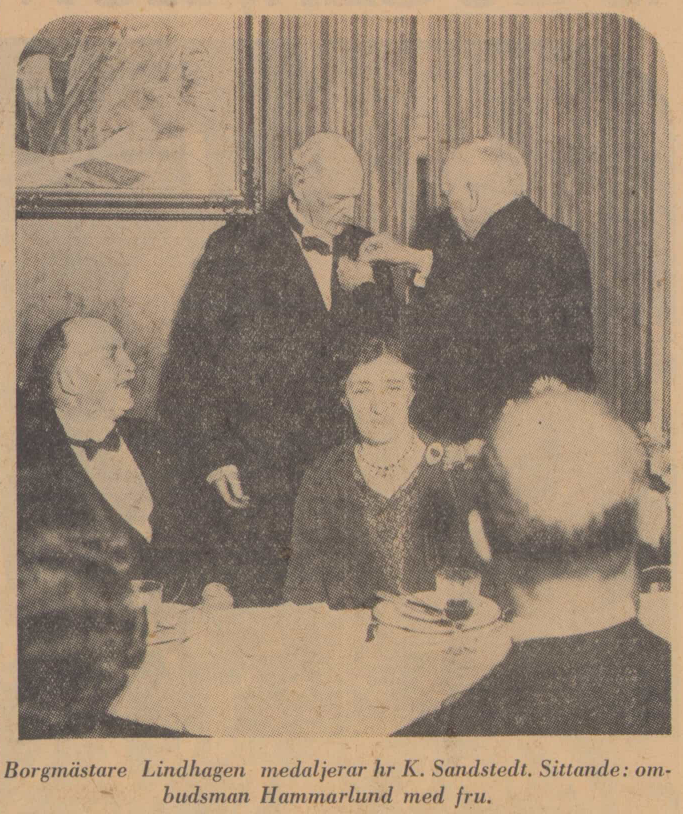
Stockholm's former borgmästare Carl Lindhagen presents the Medal for Civic Merit to Knut Sandstedt at the fiftieth-anniversary celebration of the Stockholm Peace Association, 22 May 1935.

In 1935 Sandstedt was awarded the royal Medal for Civic Merit (För medborgerlig förtjänst), fifth size in gold (Femte storleken i guld), for significant civic contributions. The decoration was granted by the King of Sweden and formally presented by the chairman of Stockholm City Council, Carl Lindhagen, in connection with the fiftieth-anniversary celebrations of the Stockholm Peace Association.

=== Nobel Peace Prize nominations ===
Sandstedt was nominated four times for the Nobel Peace Prize, twice in 1932 and twice in 1933, all jointly with his colleague Carl Sundblad. The nominations were submitted by members of the Swedish Parliament, and in 1933 the nominators explicitly recommended that the prize be shared equally between the two men.

== Personal life ==
Sandstedt married Charlotta ("Lotten") Sofia Wilhelmina Widell (6 April 1861, Rasbokil parish, Uppsala County – 25 October 1943) on 9 July 1881. She was the daughter of landowner (possessionat) Alexander Widell and Charlotta Winter. The couple had five children: Anders Alexander (b. 1882), Anna Petronella (b. 1885), Maria Kristina (b. 1892), Margareta Charlotta (b. 1894), and Birgitta Gabriella (b. 1899). In the 1900 census the family lived at Vätan N:o 1 in the Jakob och Johannes parish, Stockholm — within the 8th ward (rote) where Sandstedt himself served as registrar.

After his retirement in 1923, Sandstedt lived at Ålkistan in Stocksund, Stockholm County.

== Death ==
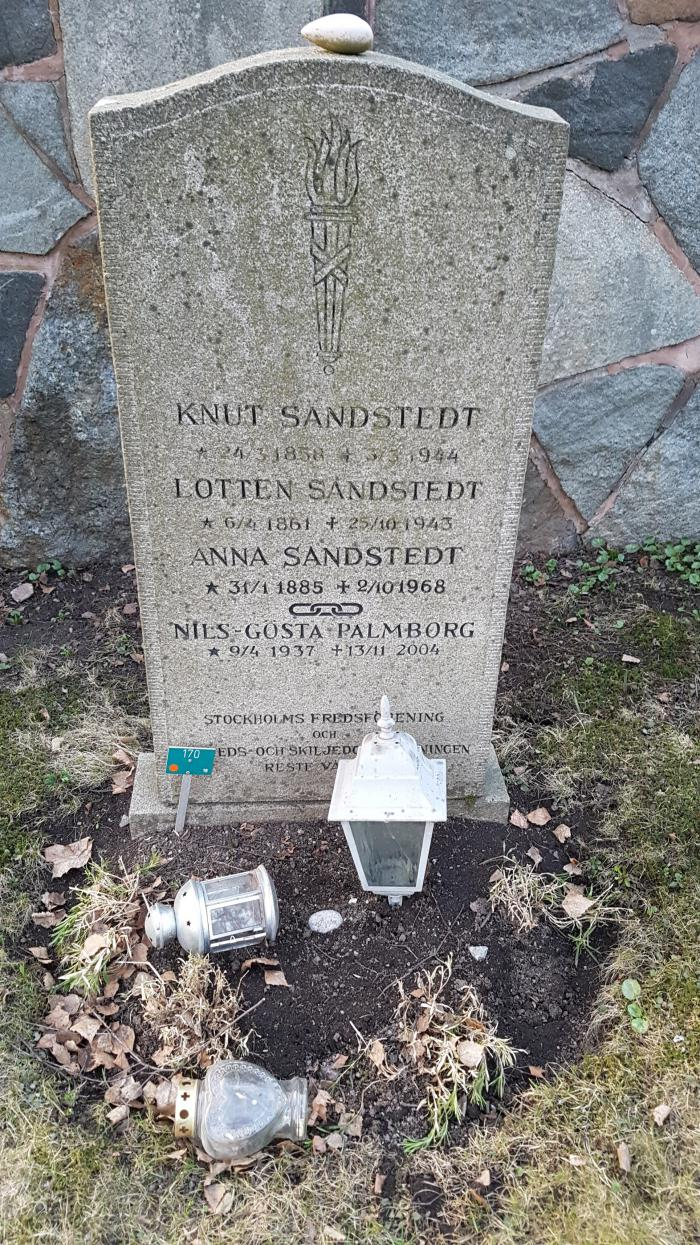
Gravestone of Knut Sandstedt and family at Solna Cemetery, erected by the Stockholm Peace Association and the Swedish Peace and Arbitration Society.

Sandstedt died on 3 March 1944 at the age of 85, less than five months after his wife. He is buried at Solna Cemetery (Solna kyrkogård), grave plot SO 18:170, alongside his wife Lotten and daughter Anna Petronella. The gravestone was erected by the Stockholm Peace Association and the Swedish Peace and Arbitration Society.

== Publications and letters ==
Note: This is a partial list based on catalogued holdings and bibliographies.

=== Authored works ===
- "De Vredesbeweging in Scandinavië" ("The Peace Movement in Scandinavia"), Vrede door Recht, May 1913.
- En enquête i världsspråksfrågan (A Survey on the World Language Question), 1920.
- En gudomlig världsordning (A Divine World Order), 1932.
- En ny världsordning på Bergspredikans grund: En social studie (A New World Order on the Basis of the Sermon on the Mount: A Social Study), 1932.
- Nordisk fredskalender (Nordic Peace Calendar), vol. 1 (1916), vol. 2 (1918), vol. 3 (1920).
- Social och religiös reformation (Social and Religious Reformation), 1935.
- "English Should Become the Universal Language." Advocate of Peace through Justice 82, no. 3 (1920): 93.

=== Edited works ===
- Minnesskrift vid Stockholms fredsförenings fyratioårsfest den 18 maj 1925 (Commemorative Publication for the Stockholm Peace Society's 40th Anniversary), 1925.
- Co-editor of Fredsfanan (The Peace Flag), the Swedish Peace and Arbitration Society's periodical publication.

=== Archived letters ===
- Letters to Emilia Fogelklou (feminist author and theologian).
- Letters to Elin Wägner (feminist author).
- Letters to Fredrik Ström (politician).
- Letter to Ludwig Quidde (politician).
- Letters to Knut Lundmark (astronomer).

== Bibliography ==
- "The Orator of Europe". Advocate of Peace through Justice. 88 (11): 589–592. November 1926. JSTOR 20661399.
- "Knut Gabriel Sandstedt – archival records". Alvin – Platform for digital collections.
- "Fredsrörelsen: Svenska Världsfredsmissionen". Blå boken: Nykterhetsfolkets kalender (in Swedish). Sveriges Nykterhetsfolks Landsråd. 1933. p. 118.
- "Folkräkningen 1900: Jakob och Johannes rote 8". Riksarkivet.
- "Resolution adopted by the Northern Peace Congress in Copenhagen, 1st and 2nd of July, 1921". Christian Arbitrator and Messenger of Peace. 47–49. Peace Association of Friends in America: 27. 1922.
- "Ungsocialisterna mot freds-vännerna". Dagens Nyheter. 4 September 1896. p. 2. KB Tidningar
- "En ovanlig fader". Dagens Nyheter. 28 June 1897. p. 1. KB Tidningar
- "Studenter och arbetare". Dagens Nyheter. 27 January 1902. p. 2. KB Tidningar
- "Kristendomsundervis-ningen i skolan". Dagens Nyheter. 24 February 1902. p. 2. KB Tidningar
- "Barn, föräldrar och skola". Dagens Nyheter. 13 March 1902. p. 2. KB Tidningar
- "Kristendomsundervisningen hufvudstadens folkskolor". Dagens Nyheter. 9 May 1902. p. 2. KB Tidningar
- "Vår fattigvård. En roteman som kritiserar F. V. O." Dagens Nyheter. 16 January 1903. p. 2. KB Tidningar
- "Rådmannen-ombudet straffas för smådelse". Dagens Nyheter. 20 February 1903. p. 2. KB Tidningar
- "Roteman Sandstedt och religionsundervisningen". Dagens Nyheter. 20 November 1904. p. 2. KB Tidningar
- "Folkundervisningsfrågan". Dagens Nyheter. 11 February 1905. p. 5. KB Tidningar
- "En sorts Ismael". Dagens Nyheter. 10 March 1905. p. 2. KB Tidningar
- "Redaktör J. L. Saxon femtio år". Dagens Nyheter. 18 February 1909. p. 5. KB Tidningar
- "Ungsocialisterna mot freds-vännerna". Dagens Nyheter. 10 December 1909. p. 8. KB Tidningar
- "Vegetarianerna hålla årsmöte i Göteborg". Dagens Nyheter. 26 June 1910. p. 7. KB Tidningar
- "Hästplågeri på Kungsgatan". Dagens Nyheter. 26 June 1910. p. 7. KB Tidningar
- "För konfessionslösa folkskolor". Dagens Nyheter. 22 February 1911. p. 5. KB Tidningar
- "Fredsmonumentet på gränsen". Dagens Nyheter. 11 April 1913. p. 3. KB Tidningar
- "Medalj för medborgerlig förtjänst åt fredsvän". Dagens Nyheter. 24 May 1935. p. 5. KB Tidningar
- "Kristen bibel bör ej bygga på judesaga". Dagens Nyheter. 10 September 1938. p. 13. KB Tidningar
- "Ärkebiskopsförsvar för Gamla testamentet". Dagens Nyheter. 7 October 1938. p. 18. KB Tidningar
- "Knut Sandstedt död". Dagens Nyheter. 5 March 1944. p. 21. KB Tidningar
- "Svenska vegetariska föreningen". Dagens Nyheter. 10 September 1945. p. 14. KB Tidningar
- Årsberättelse över Svenska Freds- och Skiljedomsföreningens verksamhet. Svenska Freds- och Skiljedomsföreningen. 1910.
- Föreningskalender för fredsrörelsen i Sverige. Svenska Freds- och Skiljedomsföreningen. 1923.
- "The history of animal rights" [Djurens Rätts historia]. Djurens Rätt.
- "Sweden, Household Examination Books, 1876–1880: Börstil, AI19a, p. 62". FamilySearch.
- "Historia" [History]. Fredsmonumentet.se (in Swedish).
- Fried, Alfred H., ed. (1913). "De Vredesbeweging in Scandinavie" (PDF). Die Friedens-Warte. 15: 238.
- "Knut Gabriel Sandstedt". Gravar.se.
- Grundel, Arvid (September 1910). "Sweden and the Peace Movement". The Advocate of Peace. 72 (8): 196–197. JSTOR 20666013.
- "Vår historia" [Our history]. Kristna Fredsrörelsen (in Swedish).
- "LIBRIS search: Sandstedt, Knut". LIBRIS.
- Nordiska fredsförbundets årsberättelse. Nordiska fredsförbundet. 1920.
- Nordiska Samfundet till bekämpande af det vetenskapliga djurplågeriet (1884). Andra årsberättelse den 6 oktober 1884 (PDF) (Report). Stockholm: O. L. Svanbäcks Boktryckeri.
- Nordiska Samfundet till bekämpande af det vetenskapliga djurplågeriet (1886). Tredje årsberättelse den 10 oktober 1885 (Report). Stockholm: O. L. Svanbäcks Boktryckeri-Aktiebolag.
- "Nomination Archive: Knut Sandstedt". NobelPrize.org.
- "Pristäflan". Nya Dagligt Allehanda. 10 February 1883. p. 1.
- "Mot djurplågeriet". Östgöten. 6 March 1886. p. 2.
- Sandstedt, Knut (March 1920). "English Should Become the Universal Language". Advocate of Peace through Justice. 82 (3): 93. JSTOR 20659304.
- Stendahl, Emil (1920). Svenska Världsfredsmissionen: Program och verksamhet. Svenska Världsfredsmissionen.
- Sundin, Bosse (2000). "Johan Saxon". Svenskt biografiskt lexikon. Vol. 31.
- Vem är det: Svensk biografisk handbok 1925. Norstedt. 1925.
- Vem är det: Svensk biografisk handbok 1933. Norstedt. 1933.
- Vem är det: Svensk biografisk handbok 1939. Norstedt. 1939.
- Vem är det: Svensk biografisk handbok 1943. Norstedt. 1943.
- Zachrisson, R. E. (Winter 1966). "The Advantages of an International Language" (PDF). Spelling Progress Bulletin. VI (4): 14–20.

== See also ==
- List of peace activists
- Swedish Peace and Arbitration Society
- Morokulien
