= Morokulien =

- Symbolic area
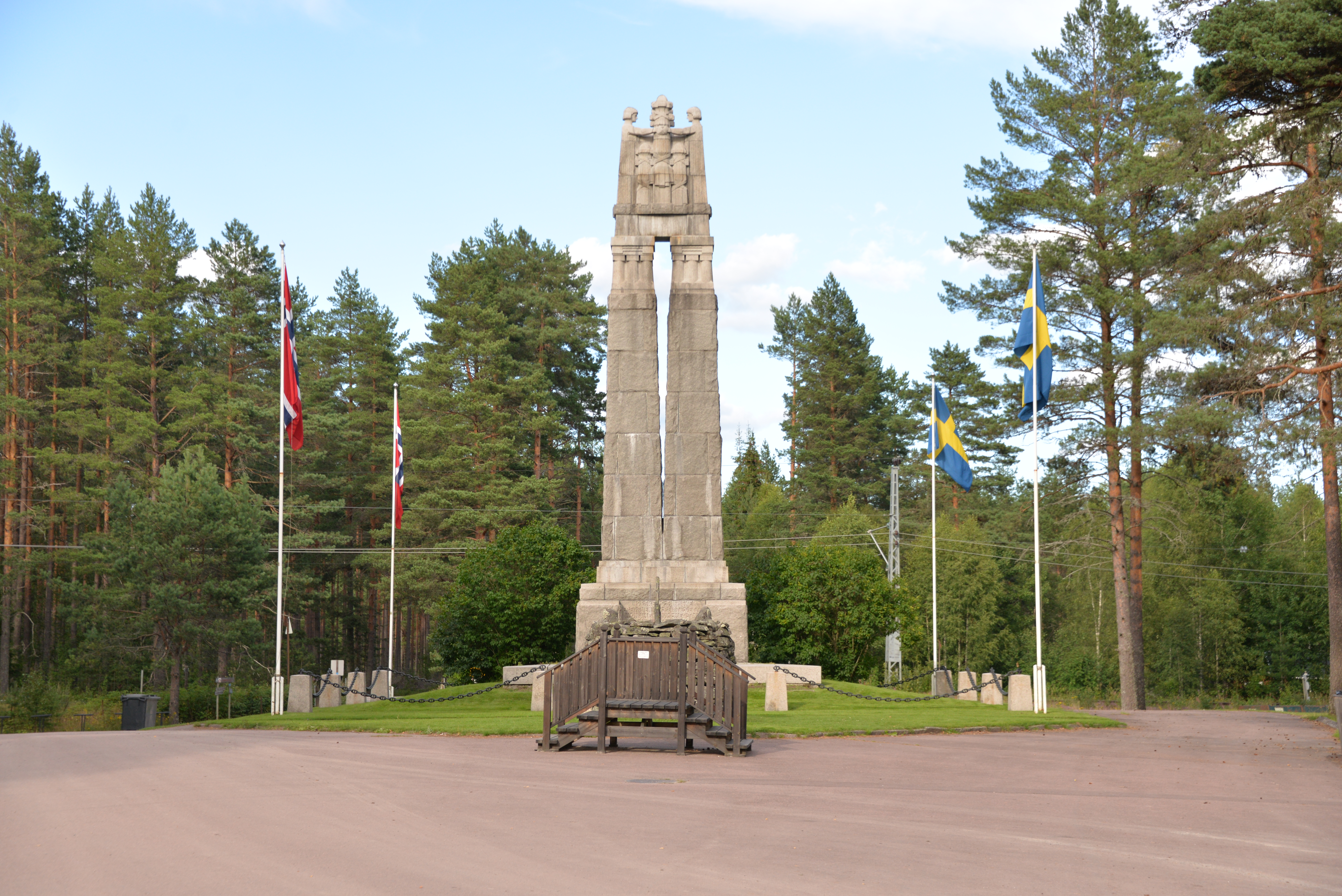
- The Peace Monument at the center of Morokulien
- Interactive map of Morokulien
- Coordinates: 59.930760°N 12.241150°E
- Countries: Norway; Sweden
- Municipalities: Eidskog (Norway); Eda (Sweden)
- Established: 1914 (Peace Monument); 1959 (name Morokulien)

Area
  - Total: 6 ha (15 acres)
- Known for: World's first transboundary peace park
- Website: morokulien.no fredsmonumentet.se

Morokulien (/mʊrʊˈkʉːliən/), also known as Fredsriket ("The Republic of Peace"), is a 6-hectare (15-acre) symbolic area on the Norway–Sweden border. A peace monument was erected there in 1914 to mark a century of peace between the two countries, and in 1959 the site became the ceremonial microstate of Morokulien during a joint Swedish–Norwegian radio broadcast. The site is widely regarded as the world's first transboundary peace park. In 2025, Morokulien became home to the world's first bi-national police station, jointly staffed by Norwegian and Swedish officers. The area functions as a cross-border tourist destination and cultural gathering place — hosting concerts, cultural events, ceremonies, and political meetings — and serves as a living symbol of the Nordic peace tradition and of cross-border cooperation between Norway and Sweden.

== Location ==
Morokulien lies between the Norwegian village of Magnor and the Swedish village of Eda glasbruk. Magnor is within Eidskog Municipality in Innlandet, Norway, and Eda glasbruk is within Eda Municipality in Värmland, Sweden. Morokulien is approximately 111 kilometres (69 mi) east of Oslo and 427 kilometres (265 mi) west of Stockholm.

The site lies where Norway's Route 2 meets Sweden's Riksväg 61, the main road between the two capital cities, and where the Kongsvinger Line and Värmland Line railways cross the border. This corridor has been the principal route between the two capitals since the late 17th century: the Vinger Royal Road, the first road suitable for wheeled traffic between Kristiania (now Oslo) and Stockholm, crossed the border between Magnor and Eda glasbruk. These transportation routes give the site both geographical and symbolic significance.

The area lies within the demilitarized zone established by the Karlstad Convention of 1905 following the peaceful dissolution of the Swedish–Norwegian Union. The border crossing at Magnor was also the route taken by Swedish forces on 1 August 1814 during the last armed conflict between the two countries, a historical association that influenced the choice of location for the monument.

== Background ==
Following the Treaty of Kiel in 1814, Sweden attempted to enforce the transfer of Norway from Denmark. Norwegian forces repelled Swedish troops in battles near Magnor, including Lier, Matrand and Skotterud. The conflict ended with the Convention of Moss, and the two countries entered a personal union under a shared monarch.

Tensions persisted until Norway peacefully dissolved the union in 1905. War was narrowly avoided, largely through the efforts of the Svenska Freds- och Skiljedomsföreningen (Swedish Peace and Arbitration Society). The resulting Karlstad Convention established a demilitarized border zone in which Morokulien lies today.

In 1914, marking the centenary of the 1814 conflict and the peace that followed, Swedish and Norwegian peace movements jointly funded and erected a monument on the border between Magnor and Eda. The surrounding 6 hectares (15 acres) of land, later known as Morokulien, came to be regarded as the world's first transboundary peace park.

== Features ==
=== The Peace Monument ===
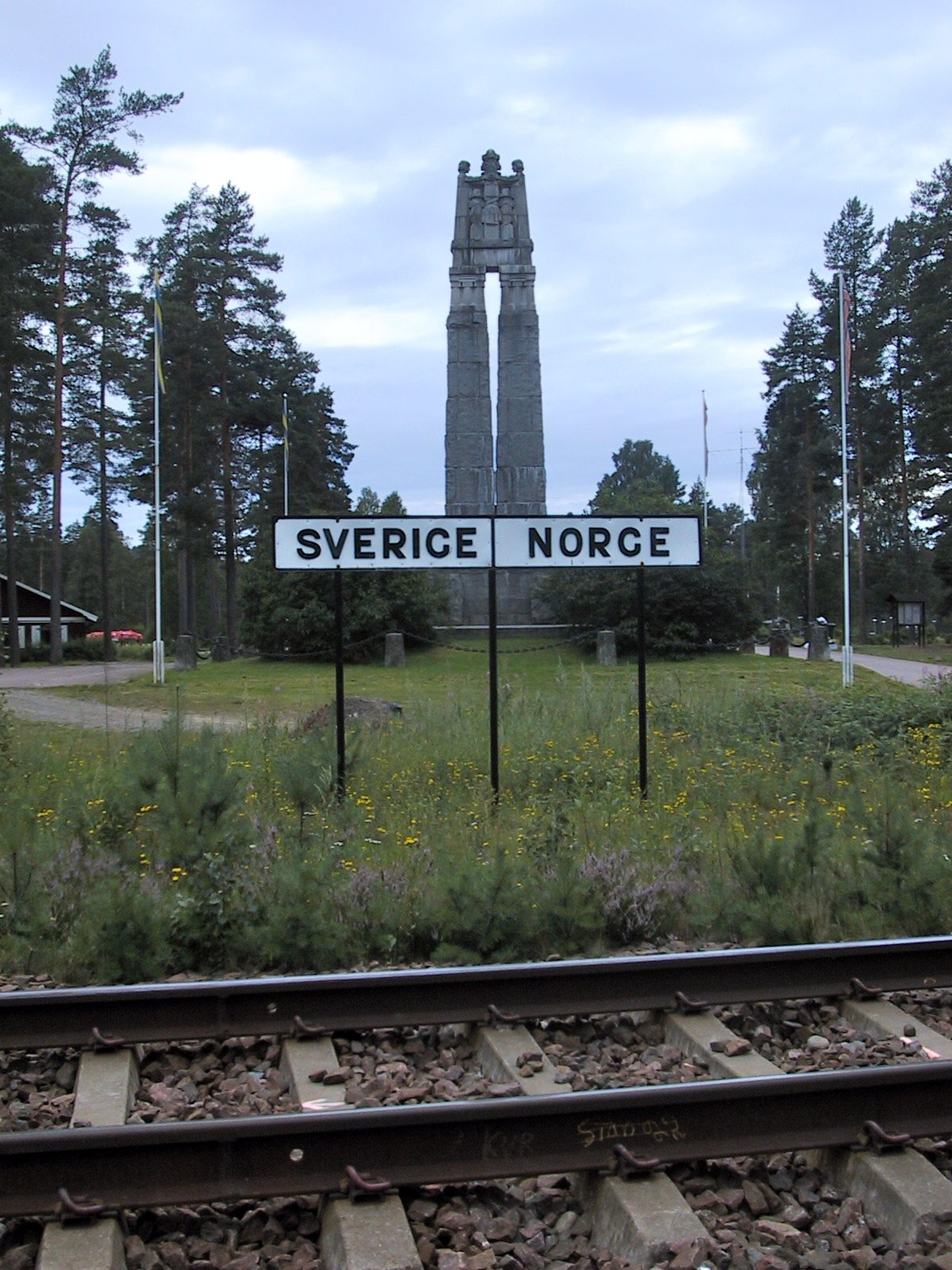
The railway border sign at Morokulien, with the Peace Monument behind it.

The idea for the Peace Monument (Swedish: Fredsmonumentet) was proposed by Knut Sandstedt, executive secretary of the Swedish Peace and Arbitration Society, at the Nordic Peace Congress in Stockholm in 1910 and approved at a subsequent congress in Kristiania in 1912. The Swedish Peace and Arbitration Society and Norges Fredslag (Norwegian Peace League) purchased 2 hectares (4.9 acres) of land on each side of the border, forming the core of what would later expand into the present 6-hectare (15-acre) site.

Fundraising was difficult, and the Swedish government initially refused to contribute. In total, 26,500 kronor was collected — a considerable sum at the time. The Swedish parliament eventually approved a grant only after the inauguration had taken place. Architect Lars Johan Lehming designed the monument and worked without pay; he later lost his position at the Swedish defense bureau because of his involvement. The structure was built from grey granite quarried at Idefjorden and transported free of charge by the Norwegian State Railways.

The monument stands 14.83 metres (48.7 ft) tall and consists of two granite pillars rising from a shared base that straddles the national boundary. The pillars symbolize the two nations, separate and independent yet rooted in a common foundation. At the top, two sculpted figures representing Norway and Sweden clasp hands across sheaves of grain, symbolizing peace, brotherhood and shared culture.

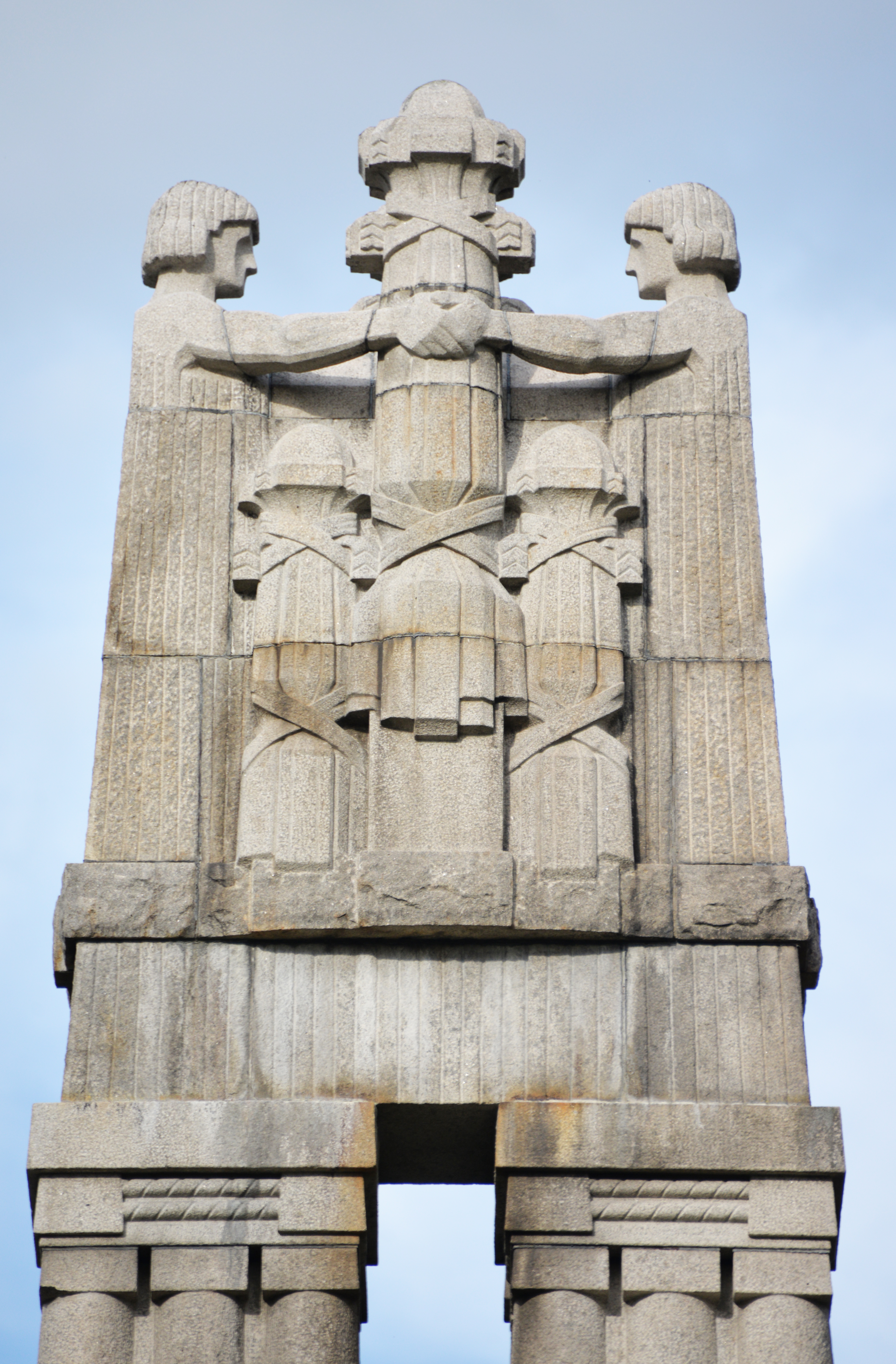
The sculpted figures at the top of the monument, clasping hands across sheaves of grain.

One inscription, facing the railway, quotes King Oscar I, the King of Sweden and Norway from 1844 to 1859: "Henceforth shall war between Scandinavian brothers be impossible." Another, facing the Peace Square (Norwegian: Fredsplassen; Swedish: Fredsplatsen), reads: "Norwegian and Swedish peace activists built this monument in 1914 in gratitude for 100 years of peace."

The inauguration on 16 August 1914 drew approximately 12,000 people, four times the number expected, including 60 Norwegian and 10 Swedish members of parliament. Speakers included Jørgen Løvland, President of the Norwegian parliament (the Storting); Bishop Knut Henning Gezelius von Schéele of Sweden; and Carl Sundblad, a founder and then vice-chairman of the Swedish Peace and Arbitration Society, who had been one of the initiators of the monument project and a signatory of the 1913 public appeal that funded it. (Note: Sundblad was nominated for the Nobel Peace Prize on thirteen occasions between 1913 and 1933, by nominators including members of the Swedish parliament, but never received the prize.) The outbreak of the First World War just weeks earlier cast a shadow over the event.

During the Second World War, the monument stood partly in German-occupied Norway. German forces respected the site, and it became one of the few places where Norwegian–Swedish couples could marry and cross the border to begin their lives together. The forested border region of Finnskogen, including areas around Morokulien, formed part of a network of clandestine routes used by Norwegian resistance members, supported by contacts and helpers on the Swedish side of the border, to move refugees and intelligence into neutral Sweden while evading German occupation forces. In the summer of 1945, shortly after the end of the war, 13,000 people gathered at Peace Square to hear Swedish diplomat Folke Bernadotte speak about his efforts to secure the release of prisoners from German concentration camps.

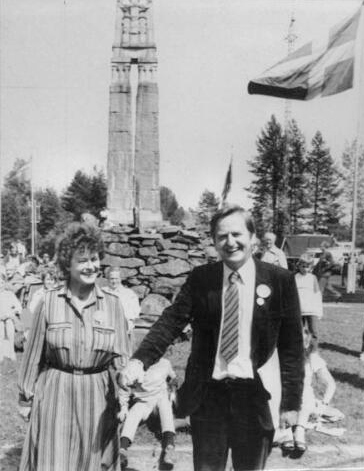
Swedish Prime Minister Olof Palme and Norwegian Prime Minister Gro Harlem Brundtland, 1983

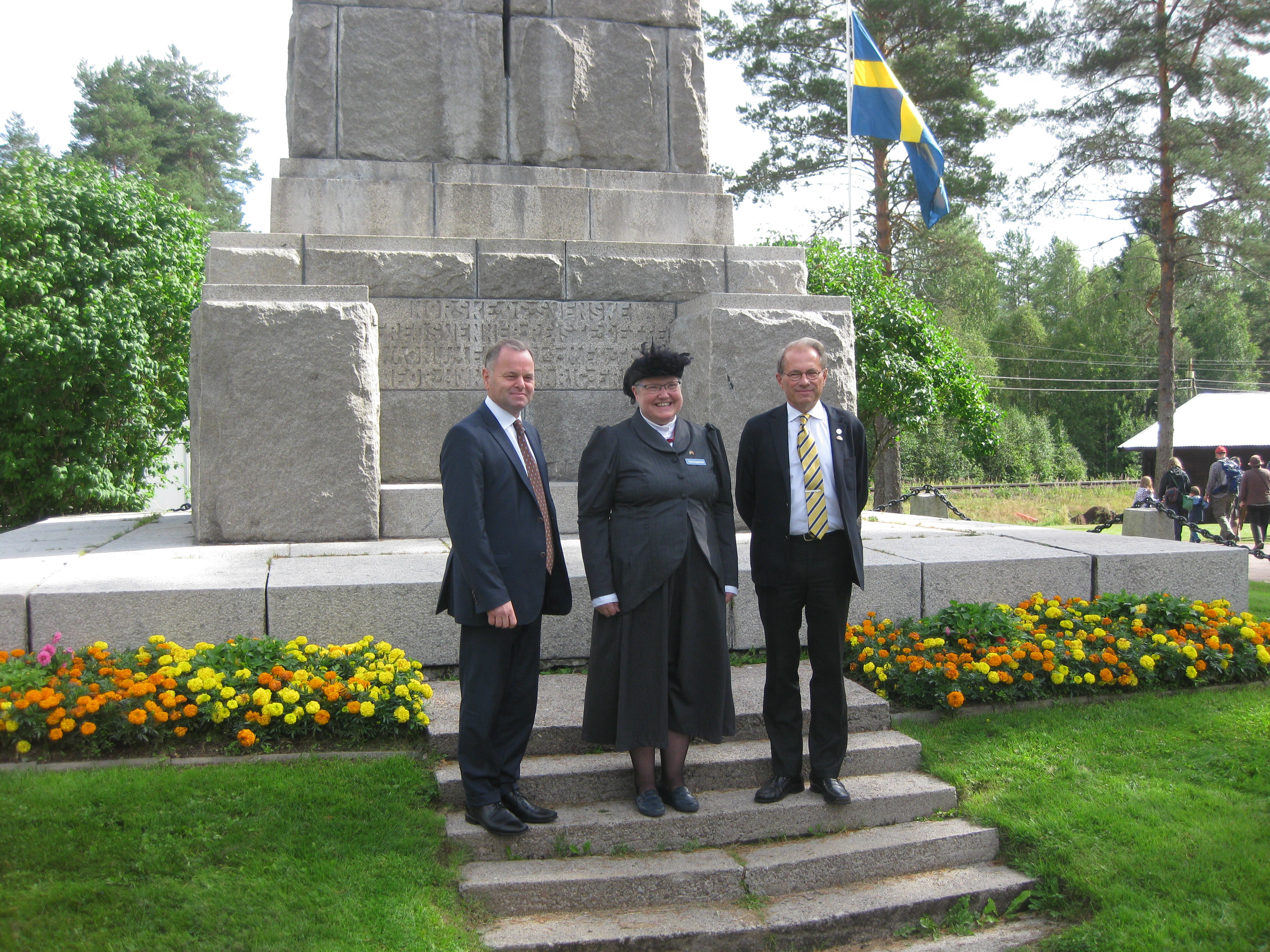
Visitor guide Christina Öster between the speakers of parliaments Per Westerberg (Sweden) and Olemic Thommessen (Norway), 2014

The centenary of the monument's inauguration was marked on 16 August 2014 by ceremonies attended by the speakers of both national parliaments, Per Westerberg and Olemic Thommessen. A Peace Bell donated by the World Peace Bell Park in Hwacheon, South Korea, was unveiled as part of a "triangle for peace" linking Hwacheon, Oslo and Morokulien.

The monument underwent major restoration between 2019 and 2021, funded by the European Regional Development Fund, Region Värmland, Innlandet County, and the municipalities of Eda, Eidskog and Filipstad, at a total cost of approximately ten million Swedish kronor. The restored monument was re-inaugurated on 25 September 2021 in a ceremony attended by representatives of the Swedish Peace and Arbitration Society and around 100 guests from both countries.

During the COVID-19 pandemic, Peace Square became a meeting point for those separated by border closures. In August 2020, Swedish climate activist Greta Thunberg, unable to cross into Norway due to travel restrictions, met Norwegian researcher Per Espen Stoknes at the border line to record an interview for a BBC documentary series. Observing COVID-19 distancing rules, they leaned back and briefly tapped shoes across the border rather than shaking hands, a gesture that also meant neither party crossed into the other country.

=== Bi-national police station ===
On 10 September 2025, a joint Norwegian–Swedish police station was inaugurated at Morokulien by Victoria, Crown Princess of Sweden, and Haakon, Crown Prince of Norway. Described as the first bi-national police station in the world, it is staffed by officers from both countries and is intended to strengthen cooperation on cross-border crime prevention, emergency response and public safety. The opening ceremony was attended by the justice ministers and national police commissioners of both countries. The station has a line on the floor marking the national boundary. Outside is an art installation by Norwegian artist Julius Karoubi comprising two mosaic-covered concrete sculptures, one on each side of the border, incorporating glass from Magnor Glassverk and Eda Glasmuseum.

=== Information Center ===
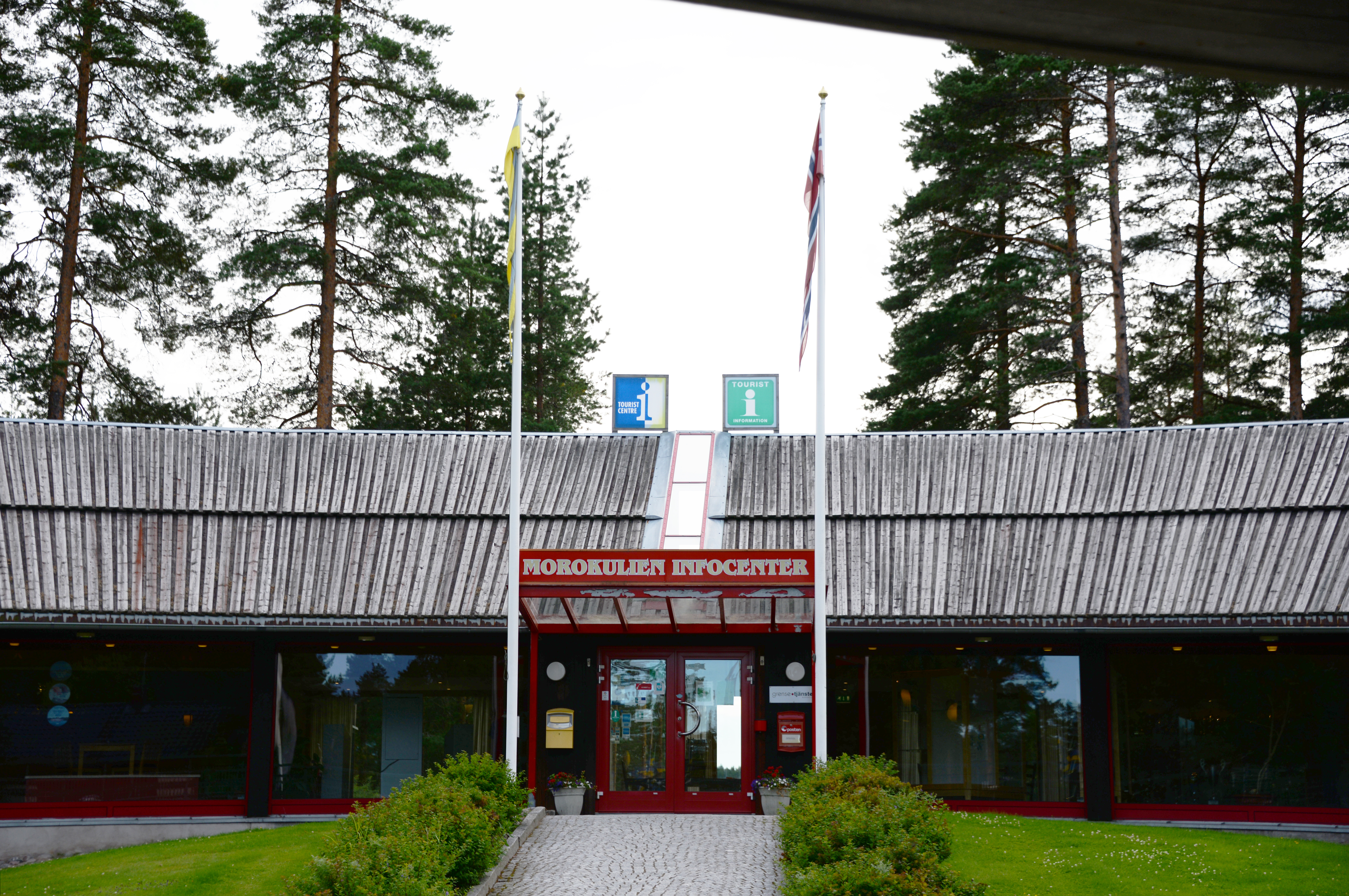
The Morokulien Information Center (Infocentret).

Built in 1996, the Morokulien Information Center is one of the few buildings in the world constructed directly over a national border. Its construction required special permission from both governments as an exception to treaty regulations governing the border zone. A glass line marks the boundary inside the building. The Information Center has a shared post office with the Norwegian postcode 2242 and Swedish postcode 673 93. At the entrance, a Norwegian letterbox stands on the right and a Swedish letterbox on the left, allowing visitors to post letters bearing stamps from either country.

The building houses a gift shop, tourist information services for both countries, and the offices of Grensetjänsten Norge–Sverige, a permanent cross-border advisory service established in 1997. Grensetjänsten provides guidance on taxation, social insurance, employment law and related issues for people who live in one country and work in the other. In 2024 it handled more than 16,000 inquiries and its website received around 300,000 visits. It forms part of the Nordic Council of Ministers' framework for freedom of movement.

=== Amateur radio station ===
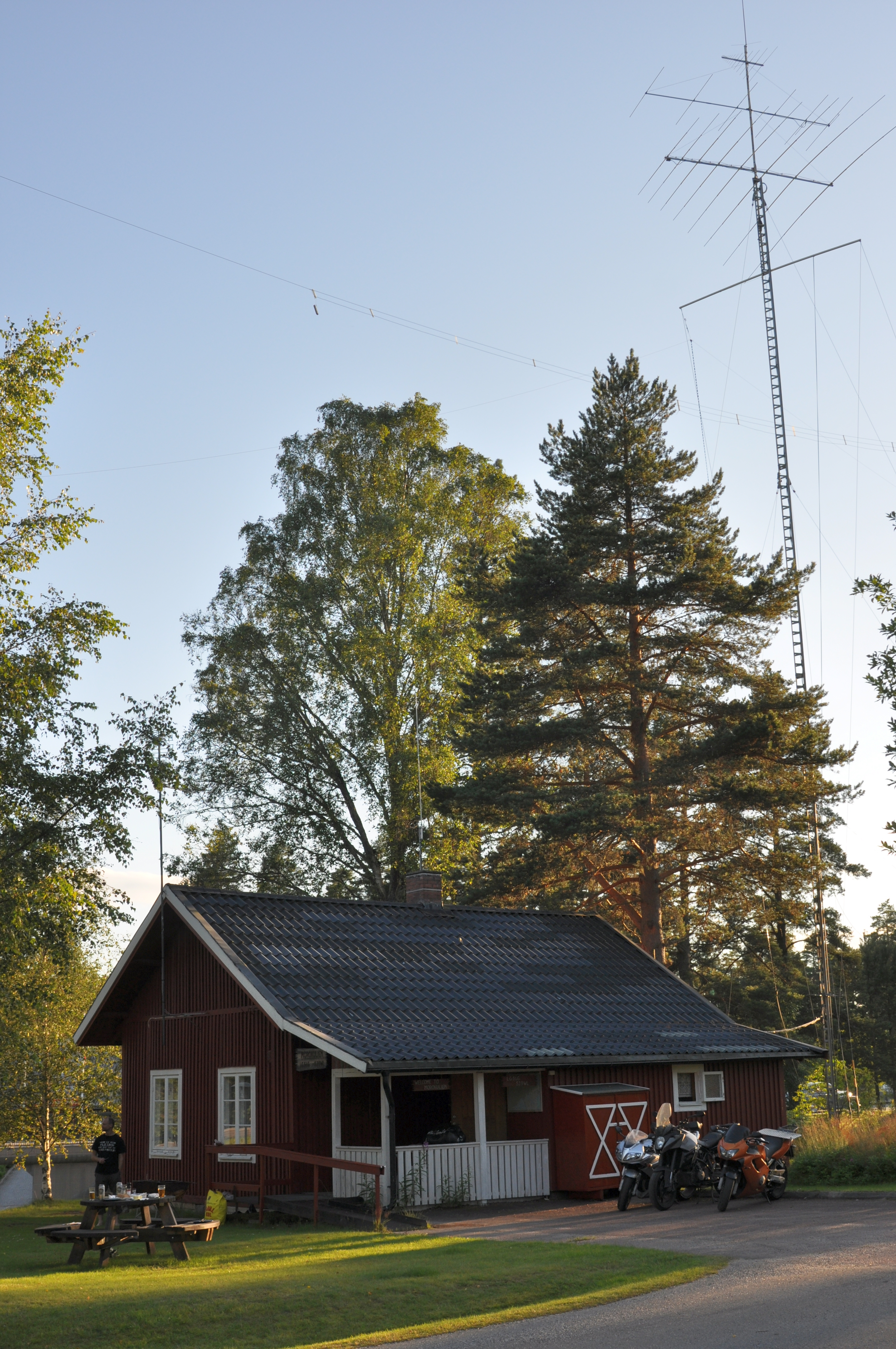
The Grensstua (border cottage) housing the amateur radio station.

Grensstua (literally "border cottage"; Swedish: Gränsstugan) on the Norwegian side houses the Morokulien amateur radio station, operated by ARIM (Amatörradio i Morokulien) since 1968. The station operates under call signs SJ9WL (Sweden) and LG5LG (Norway). Operators staying for several days must daily alternate the call. Since becoming active, operators and visitors have made more than 2.3 million contacts worldwide. The cottage can be rented by visiting radio amateurs, with proceeds funding licenses for people with disabilities. ARIM organizes an annual Morokulien HAM Day each August, held on the weekend closest to 16 August, the anniversary of the monument's inauguration.

=== Other features ===
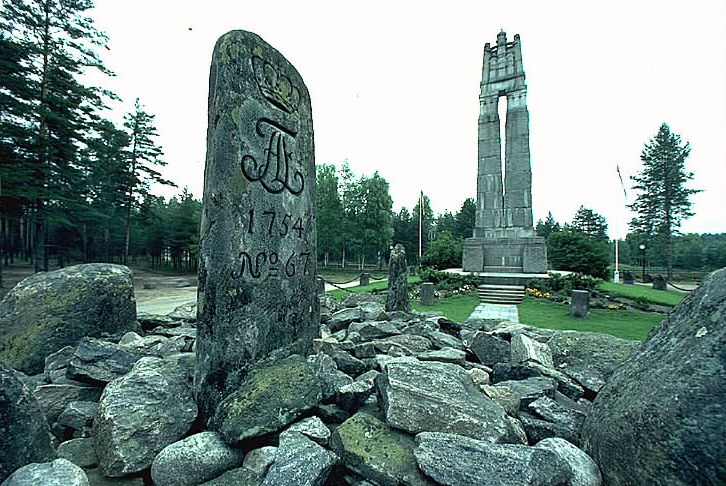
Riksröse nr. 67, a border marker from 1754, with the Peace Monument behind it.

Standing directly in front of the monument is Riksröse nr. 67, one of 642 border markers along the Norway–Sweden border, dating from 1754.

Brennastua, a timber building dating from around 1800, was relocated to the site from Dal, a small locality within Eidskog municipality in Norway, in 1961. It previously served as a dwelling, a staging post and, from 1859, Eidskog's first council chamber.

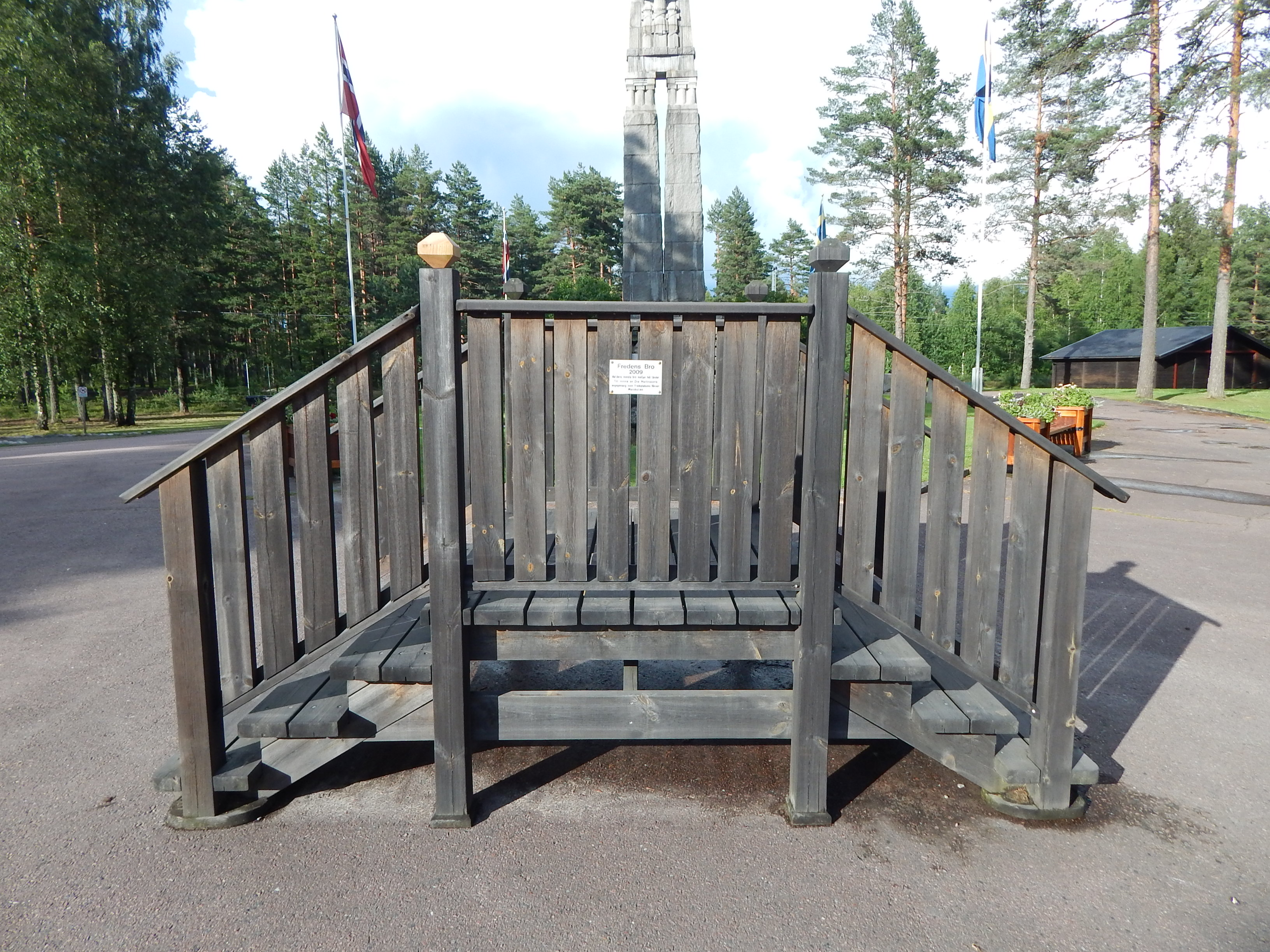
Fredens bro (Peace Bridge), built in 2009.

The Peace Bridge (Norwegian and Swedish: Fredens bro) is a small wooden footbridge that crosses the national boundary. Completed in 2009, it was dedicated to the memory of Ove Martinsson, a former chair of Friends of the Peace Square.

The Peace Bell (Norwegian and Swedish: Fredsklockan) donated by South Korea in 2014 stands in a Korean-style pagoda. The bell bears the inscription “Tid för fred” (“Time for peace”).

A sundial stands directly on the boundary line, with the flagpole at its center serving as the gnomon.

The Ministers' Grove (Norwegian and Swedish: Ministerlunden), established in 2004 for the monument's 90th anniversary, is a planting of trees by prominent Norwegians and Swedes as symbols of cross-border fellowship. The first tree was planted by Norway's then Foreign Minister Thorvald Stoltenberg, and subsequent trees have been planted by figures including Swedish politician Björn von Sydow. In 2010, a peace tree was planted nearby by Sumitra Gandhi Kulkarni, a granddaughter of Mahatma Gandhi.

An open-air amphitheater hosts concerts and cultural events during the summer.

Four artist‑designed cornerstones originally marked the limits of Morokulien, though only three remain today.

=== Campground and restaurant ===
Morokulien Camping, adjacent to the Peace Square on the Norwegian side, offers nine cabins and powered sites for RVs/trailers, as well as space for tents and hammocks among the pine trees. It holds a Green Key sustainability certification. The restaurant Glasshytta Spiseri is located immediately beside the campsite. Additional offsite accommodations are within a ten-minute walk of Morokulien.

=== Hiking ===
Finnskogleden (literally "the Finn Forest path") is a 240 kilometres (150 mi) hiking trail running from Morokulien in Eidskog northward to Søre Osen in Trysil, crossing the national border between Norway and Sweden seven times and passing through ten municipalities — seven in Norway and three in Sweden. It is divided into 13 stages and typically takes 14 days to complete. The trail is waymarked in orange on the Swedish side and blue on the Norwegian side.

Grensesømmen (literally "the border seam"; Swedish: Gränssöm) is an approximately 2,400 kilometres (1,500 mi) long trail running the full length of the Norway–Sweden border from Halden in the south to Treriksrøysa in Troms, passing through Morokulien along its route. Launched in 2005 as a joint project of the Norwegian Trekking Association and the Swedish Tourist Association to mark the centenary of the peaceful dissolution of the Swedish–Norwegian union, it is waymarked throughout, except within protected national parks.

== The Republic of Peace ==
=== Transformation into symbolic micronation ===
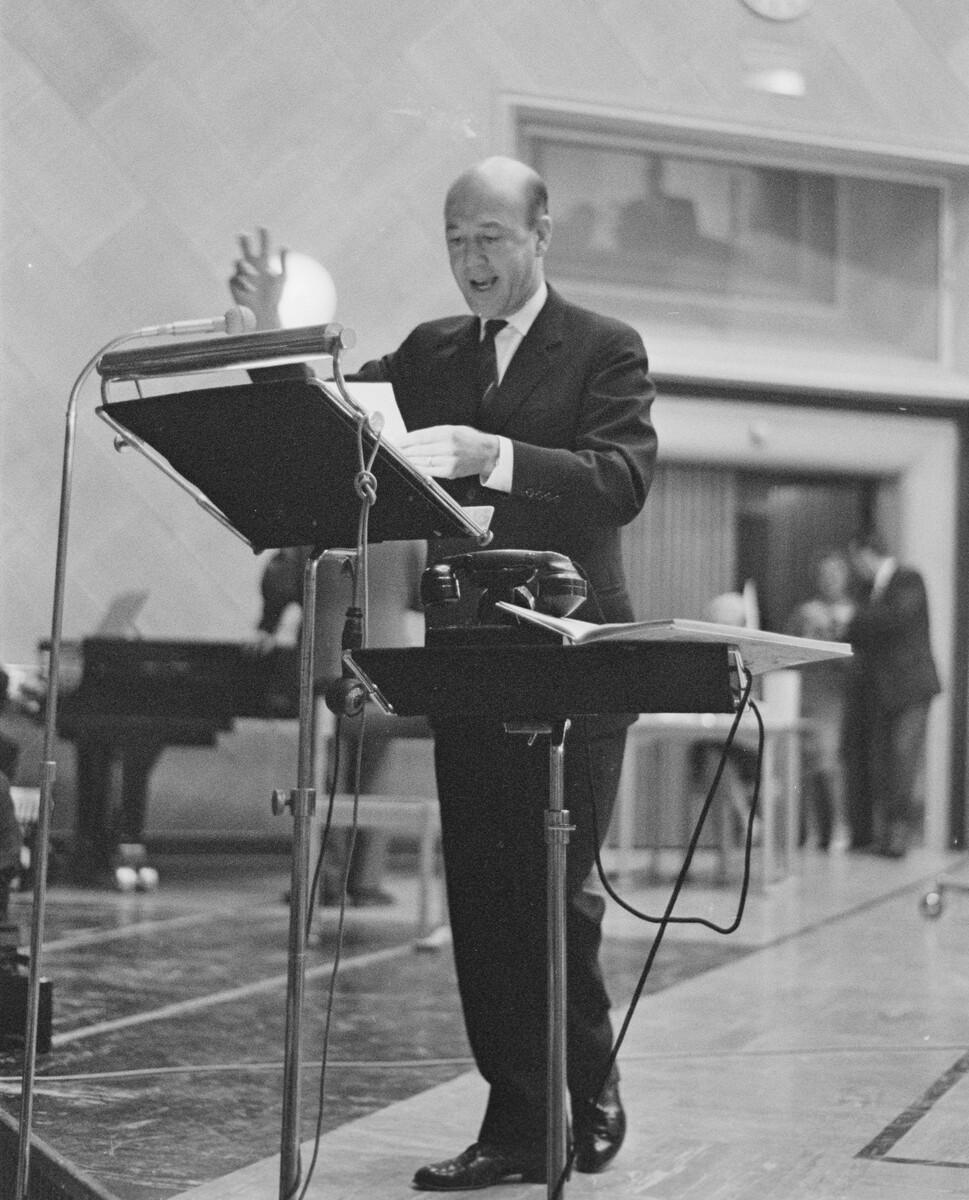
Lennart Hyland during the 1959 broadcast.

In 1959, Allan Schulman, a production director at Sveriges Radio, conceived the idea of a joint Swedish–Norwegian radio broadcast from the peace monument. The program, titled Över alla gränser ("Across All Borders"), was originally conceived as a series of twelve weekly radio broadcasts on Sveriges Radio and NRK, running from October through Christmas 1959. It was hosted by Swedish broadcaster Lennart Hyland and Norwegian actress and presenter Randi Kolstad, with scripts contributed by writers including Arild Feldborg and Otto Nielsen. Norwegian and Swedish television later joined the project, expanding it beyond radio.

On the evening of 3 October 1959, during the first broadcast, Sweden's Prime Minister Tage Erlander and Norway's Prime Minister Einar Gerhardsen, who were in attendance, symbolically recognized the area as a (temporary) new Nordic state. Hyland coined its name live on air: Morokulien, combining the Norwegian word moro and the Swedish word kul, both meaning "fun." (Note: In English the name is approximately pronounced "moo-roo-KOO-lee-en"; the stress falls on the third syllable. The word is a deliberate cross-language blend — sometimes described as a svorsk (Swedish-Norwegian) portmanteau — combining Norwegian moro and Swedish kul with the suffix -i-en, meaning "in one.") The Swedish Peace and Arbitration Society proclaimed it Fredsriket (The Republic of Peace).

Hyland assumed the role of head of state and, in keeping with the playful spirit of the project, appointed both a king and a queen. As part of the broadcast, a fundraising letter campaign was launched. A temporary post office was established at Morokulien to handle letters bearing a special charity stamp issued for the United Nations World Refugee Year. Around one million letters passed through Morokulien in the following two months raising funds for refugee relief. In addition, a cross-border pen-pal initiative reunited, among others, two women who had corresponded since 1905 but had never met.

The programs attracted prominent performers. The soprano Kirsten Flagstad, one of the great operatic voices of the twentieth century, made her final public appearance in a Morokulien television program on 21 November 1959. Hyland himself became so closely identified with Morokulien that a wooden statue of him stood at the monument for many years; it had disappeared by 2005.

The broadcast was explicitly conceived as a humanitarian project as much as an entertainment event. All proceeds from the letter campaign went to the Swedish Red Cross for refugee relief. To give the project tangible expression beyond fundraising, a house was built on the site in just two weeks, funded by public donations, to accommodate a Hungarian refugee family who had fled after the 1956 uprising. The house was named Lindblomsvillan after Erik August Lindblom, a Baptist minister, Liberal politician, and then chairman of the Swedish Peace and Arbitration Society, the organization that owned the land. A filling station on the border provided the family with a sustainable income. The project attracted international attention: United Nations Secretary-General Dag Hammarskjöld, himself a Swede and a committed multilateralist, followed events at Morokulien closely and received regular updates throughout the World Refugee Year.

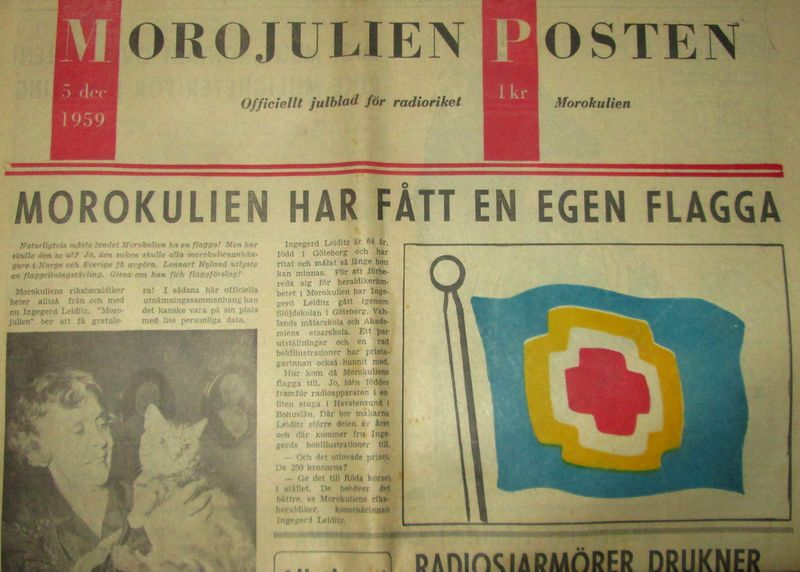
Front page of Morokulienposten, 5 December 1959, announcing the new Morokulien flag.

Morokulien has retained the playful character established in 1959. The symbolic republic issues souvenir passports, whose holders are entered into a citizens' register (borgarboken), as well as its own novelty currency, the daler, and its own flag combining the colors of Norway and Sweden. The flag was designed by Gothenburg artist Ingegerd Leiditz, who won a public competition announced by Lennart Hyland; she donated the 250-kronor prize to the Red Cross.

=== Ownership and governance ===
The land on which Morokulien stands was originally owned by the Swedish Peace and Arbitration Society on the Swedish side and Norwegian Peace League on the Norwegian side. For most of the twentieth century the two organizations maintained the site and organized events there.

In 2005, both organizations transferred their land to the respective local municipalities. The Swedish Peace and Arbitration Society sold its portion to Eda municipality, and the Norwegian Peace League sold its portion to Eidskog municipality. Day-to-day management is handled by Friends of the Peace Square (Norwegian: Fredsplassens Venner; Swedish: Fredsplatsens Vänner), a joint Swedish–Norwegian association that leases the area from the municipalities. The information center building, which straddles the border, is jointly owned by Eda and Eidskog municipalities.

== Scholarly interpretations and symbolism ==
Scholars have interpreted Morokulien as a significant example of how borders acquire cultural and symbolic meaning. Swedish historian Magnus Rodell argued that the 1914 inauguration "gave the monument and its message the spatial presence it still possesses," noting that its placement directly on the boundary was intended to transform the frontier from a site of conflict into a shared space of reconciliation.

Rodell situates the monument within the spatial turn in the humanities, emphasizing that peace monuments were rare before the Second World War and that Morokulien exemplifies how borders are culturally constructed and continuously renegotiated rather than fixed or natural.

A consistent theme in the scholarship is the civic character of the project. Both the monument and the later Republic of Peace were conceived and driven by private citizens and peace organizations rather than by the states whose reconciliation they marked. The English historian Peter Gatrell describes Morokulien as a bottom-up border initiative, contrasting it with later European projects such as Schengen, which he characterizes as largely top-down and technocratic. He also characterizes the surviving site as evidence of a serious experiment in the dissolution of borders between sovereign states — one that predated the Schengen Agreement by a generation.

Norwegian historian Per Jostein Ringsby interprets Morokulien as part of a shared Scandinavian peace tradition rather than a distinctly Norwegian or Swedish phenomenon, emphasizing the joint civic culture that conceived, funded and dedicated the monument. International scholars and organizations have cited Morokulien as a model for transboundary cooperation and peace parks in other regions, including Northeast Asia and the Balkans.

== Bibliography ==
- Alden, Edward; Trautman, Laurie (2025). When the World Closed Its Doors: The COVID-19 Tragedy and the Future of Borders. Oxford University Press.
- Andersen, Terje (4 March 2010). "Alene langs Grensesømmen". Adresseavisen.
- "Radiostugan i Morokulien" (PDF). QTC Magazine. 2006.
- Berg, Roald (2014). "Denmark, Norway and Sweden in 1814: A geopolitical and contemporary perspective". Scandinavian Journal of History. doi:10.1080/03468755.2013.876929.
- "The first transboundary protected area". Convention on Biological Diversity.
- DL6BZ. "Morokulien".
- "Fördjupad översiktsplan för Eda Glasbruk" (PDF). Eda kommun. 2009.
- "Detaljplan för polisstation vid Morokulien" (PDF). Eda kommun. 2023.
- "Historisk invigning på gränsen och kungligt besök". Eda kommun. 2025.
- "Grensesømmen gjennom Eidskog" (in Norwegian). Eidskog kommune. 24 March 2021.
- "The story of 1814 in 1-2-3". Eidsvoll 1814.
- Elghorn, Anders (2005). "Hyland borta i Morokulien". Dala-Demokraten.
- "Morokulien – Postal Code Lookup". ECER Cross-border Logistics Platform.
- "Arild Feldborg". Norsk biografisk leksikon. 2005.
- "Fredsmonumentet i Morokulien". FinnskogMagasinet. RM Reklam & Tryck. 2022.
- "Fredsplatsen Morokulien Historia". Fredsmonumentet.
- "Kirsten Flagstad". Norsk biografisk leksikon. 2005.
- "Generationsskifte i Morokulien". Fredsplatsens Vänner. 2009.
- Frängsmyr, Carl (2013). "Fredsforskning i Uppsala – återblick på ett halvsekel" (PDF). Uppsala University.
- Gatrell, Peter (2011). "World Refugee Year, 1959–60 and the history of population displacement" (PDF). Slavic Research Centre, Hokkaido University.
- Gatrell, Peter (2022). "World Refugee Year, 1959–60 and the humanitarian exhibition". In Farré, Sébastien; Fayet, Jean-François; Taithe, Bertrand (eds.). L'Humanitaire s'exhibe (1867–2016). Georg Éditeur. pp. 116–143. ISBN 9782825712795.
- Gatrell, Peter (2026). "Review of Stanley-Becker, Europe without Borders". H-Diplo.
- "Grensetjänsten Norge–Sverige". Nordic Labour Journal. 2025.
- "Morokulien as a Model for Northeast Asian Peace" (PDF). Institute for Security and Development Policy. 2011.
- "Eda-Eidskog politistasjon". Kunst i offentlige rom (KORO). 2025.
- "HM the King's speech at luncheon with the Nordic Council". The Royal Court of Sweden. 2025.
- "Flyktningeruta". Lokalhistoriewiki. Norsk lokalhistorisk institutt. 2025-04-25.
- "Morokulien Camping". Morokulien Camping.
- "Morokulien har fått en egen flagga". Morokulienposten (in Swedish). 5 December 1959.
- "Carl Sundblad – Nobel Peace Prize nominations". Nobel Prize Outreach.
- "Moro og kult på Fredsplassen" (in Norwegian). NRK. 2005.
- Nordin, Peter (2016). "Morokulien" (PDF). Svensk Filatelistisk Tidskrift. 117 (7): xx–xx.
- "Jørgen Gunnarson Løvland". Norwegian Social Science Data Service. 2016.
- "1959 – året när Morokulien blev riket på allas läppar". Nya Wermlands-Tidningen. 2012.
- "Otto Nielsen". Norsk biografisk leksikon. 2005.
- Ringsby, Per Jostein (2011). "Ingen særnorsk fredstradisjon". University of Oslo.
- Rodell, Magnus (2010). "Monumentet på gränsen: Om den rumsliga vändningen och ett fredsmonument". Scandia (in Swedish). 74 (2): 15–51.
- Russell, Dave (15 May 2025). "Neighbours to share police station: 'Half the building is in Sweden, the other half in Norway'". Sveriges Radio.
- Sandbekken, Martin (2005). "The Norwegian-Swedish War of 1814". The Napoleon Series.
- "Finnskogene". Store norske leksikon. 2025.
- "Greta Thunberg: Ungewöhnliches Interview und seltene Ehrung" (in German). Stern. 6 August 2020.
- "Markerte 200 år med fred i Norden". Stortinget. 2014.
- Swatuk, Larry A. (2019). "Confronting the Elephant in the Room: Peace Parks in Theory and Practice". Routledge Handbook of Environmental Security. Routledge. ISBN 9781138092297.
- Thorstensson, Anna (2014). Sista länken till Sverige under kriget: Motståndsmän i den norska motståndsrörelsen 1942–1945 (D-uppsats). Karlstads universitet.
- "The Finnskogen Trail". Visit Øst-Norge. 2025.
- "Finnskogleden Trail North". Visit Norway. 2025.
- "Fredsriket Morokulien (visitor brochure)" (PDF). Visit Värmland / Eidskog kommune. 2021.
- Zitelmann, Rainer (31 August 2020). "Greta Thunberg, génie de la communication" (in French). Le Point.
- Hellström, Agnes (2021). "Återinvigning av minnesmärket för kriget som aldrig bröt ut". Fredstidningen PAX (in Swedish). No. 4. Svenska Freds- och Skiljedomsföreningen.
- "Fredens sekelminne 1914: Till svenska folket!". Dagens Nyheter (in Swedish). 10 February 1913.
- "Fredsmonumentets tillkomst: Initiativet till resandet av minnesmärket vid Eda glasbruk". Dagens Nyheter (in Swedish). 24 February 1933.
- "Dödsfall: Carl Sundblad". Svensk Lärartidning (in Swedish). 1933. p. 1238.
- Vegvalg. Statens vegvesen, Vegdirektoratet. 2002. p. 245. ISBN 8291130205.
