= Emil Larsson =

Emil Larsson may refer to:

- Emil Larsson (film maker) (born 1979), Swedish film director and film producer
- Emil Larsson (ice hockey) (born 1993), Swedish ice hockey player

== See also ==
- Emil Larsen (born 1991), Danish footballer
- Emil Larsen (wrestler) (1888–1942), Danish wrestler
