= Eldh-Ekblad Peace Prize =

Swedish peace prize awarded by the Swedish Peace and Arbitration Society

- Native name: Eldh-Ekblads fredspris
- Awarded for: Mapping psychological and material causes of war; promoting peace and understanding among peoples
- Description: Peace prize awarded by the Swedish Peace and Arbitration Society
- Sponsored by: The Nils and Signe Eldh-Ekblad Foundation
- Venue: Svenska Freds kongress
- Country: Sweden
- Eligibility: Swedish authors, lecturers, and other contributors to peace
- Reward: 5,000 SEK
- Established: 1960
- First award: 1960
- Most recent recipient: Klas Östergren (2026)
- Website: Eldh-Ekblads fredspris

The Eldh-Ekblad Peace Prize (Eldh-Ekblads fredspris), formally The Nils and Signe Eldh-Ekblad Foundation Peace Prize (Stiftelsen Makarna Nils och Signe Eldh-Ekblads fredspris), is a Swedish peace prize awarded since 1960 by the Swedish Peace and Arbitration Society (SFSF). It is regarded as the society's most prestigious distinction.

== Background ==
The prize was founded in 1960 by Signe Ekblad-Eldh (1903–1960) in memory of her husband Nils Eldh (1888–1960), and is administered by the foundation that bears both their names. The couple were active members of the Swedish Peace and Arbitration Society. A separate award, the Signe Ekblad-Eldhs pris, was endowed through Signe Ekblad-Eldh's will and is awarded by the Swedish Academy for excellence in literature.

== Nominations ==
Nominations may be made by the SFSF, the Swedish branch of the Women's International League for Peace and Freedom, the Nordic Peace University Foundation, and the United Nations Association of Sweden.

According to the SFSF's statutes, the prize is intended for a Swedish author or lecturer who, during the three-year period preceding the award, has best mapped the psychological and material causes of war in a peace-friendly spirit — particularly the chain of causation linking fear, armament, aggression, and war — or who has otherwise, in an outstanding manner, advanced the foundation's purpose of promoting peace and understanding among peoples. Although the statutes mention authors and lecturers, the prize has also been awarded to journalists, activists, working groups, and civil society organisations whose work aligns with these aims.

The prize was originally awarded annually, but since 2018 it has been awarded biennially at the SFSF's congress.

== Recipients ==
- 1960 – Per Anders Fogelström
- 1962 – Tore Zetterholm
- 1963 – Filip Stenson
- 1964 – Emilia Fogelklou
- 1965 – Bertil Svahnström
- 1966 – Peace organisations' inquiry into conscription (Fredsorganisationernas utredning i värnpliktsfrågan)
- 1967 – August Spångberg
- 1968 – Greta Engkvist and Åke Sandin
- 1969 – Östen Johannesson and Holger Eriksson
- 1970 – Ingrid Reinius-Larsson
- 1971 – Working group behind the book Fredspolitik – civilmotstånd (Peace Policy – Civil Resistance)
- 1972 – Bosse Gustafson
- 1973 – Maj-Britt Theorin and Ulrich Herz
- 1974 – Harald Ofstad
- 1975 – Aktion Stoppa kärnkraften and Migri
- 1976 – Christer Sandstedt and Ingemar Fridell
- 1977 – Lennart Ivarsson
- 1978 – Maj Wechselmann
- 1979 – Ulf Norenius
- 1980 – Ingrid Segerstedt-Wiberg and Dagmar Stake
- 1981 – Git Alberg
- 1982 – Working group behind the SFSF's defence policy programme
- 1983 – Tomas Magnusson
- 1984 – Henrik Westander
- 1985 – Ingemar Myrberg and Ann Margret Dahlquist-Ljungberg
- 1986 – Ingvar Bratt
- 1987 – Bengt Danielsson
- 1988 – India group of the Tyresö Developing Countries and Peace Association (Tyresö U-lands och Fredsförenings Indiengrupp)
- 1989 – Astrid Einarsson
- 1990 – Jan Wogel and Cilla Lundström
- 1991 – Eva Moberg
- 1992 – Rainer Santi
- 1993 – Rune Andréasson and Martha Henriksson-Cullberg
- 1994 – Eva Zillén and Kerstin Grebäck
- 1995 – Lars Ångström
- 1996 – Ingebritt Granath and Lars Jederlund
- 1997 – Anita Klum
- 1998 – Martin Holmberg
- 1999 – Anita Dorazio and Hédi Fried
- 2000 – Henning Mankell
- 2001 – Anita Goldman
- 2002 – Peter Englund
- 2003 – Helle Klein
- 2004 – Christian Palme
- 2005 – Sverker Åström
- 2006 – Thomas Hammarberg
- 2007 – Cordelia Edvardson
- 2008 – Frida Blom
- 2009 – Elin Jönsson
- 2010 – Saam Kapadia and Jeppe Wikström
- 2011 – Stina Oscarson
- 2012 – Özz Nûjen
- 2013 – Peter Wallensteen
- 2014 – Farnaz Arbabi and Jonas Hassen Khemiri
- 2015 – Rickard Söderberg
- 2016 – Nils Resare, Brit Stakston and Martin Schibbye (Blankspot)
- 2017 – Afrah Nasser
- 2018 – Mattias Göransson
- 2020 – Beatrice Fihn
- 2022 – Östgruppen
- 2024 – Cartoonists' Appeal against NATO and Nuclear Weapons (Tecknaruppropet mot Nato och Kärnvapen)
- 2026 – Klas Östergren

== Bibliography ==
- Åshede, Ulla (2021). "Signe Ekblad-Eldh". Svenskt kvinnobiografiskt lexikon.
- "Eldh-Ekblads fredspris" (in Swedish). Svenska Freds- och Skiljedomsföreningen. 14 November 2025.
- "Klas Östergren tilldelas Eldh-Ekblads fredspris" (Press release) (in Swedish). Svenska Freds- och Skiljedomsföreningen. 18 March 2026.
