= Christian Palme =

Swedish communications expert, journalist and writer

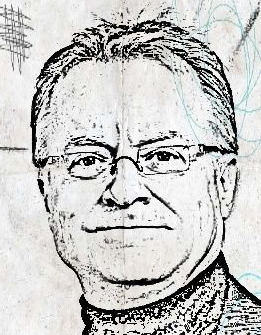
- Christian Palme
- Born: 15 July 1952 (age 73); Uppsala, Sweden
- Occupations: Writer, journalist, communications expert
- Awards: Eldh-Ekblad Peace Prize (2004), Swedish Publishing Award (2010)
- Website: http://www.palme.nu/tribunal http://www.palme.se/blog https://www.twitter.com/ChPalme

Christian Palme (born 15 July 1952 in Uppsala, Sweden) is a Swedish communications expert, journalist and writer. He is a son of the late historian, professor Sven Ulric Palme and brother of professor emeritus Jacob Palme. His grandfather was the historian Olof Palme (1884–1918), and his great-grandmother was Swedish-speaking Finnish women's rights activist Hanna Palme.

== Career ==
As a young journalist Christian Palme worked with the Swedish national daily Svenska Dagbladet, Swedish public service radio Sveriges Radio and the news agency United Press International. In 1984 he was appointed correspondent in Denmark for the Swedish national daily Dagens Nyheter and in 1993 he became correspondent in Eastern Europe and the Balkans for Dagens Nyheter. He has also been employed as intelligence analyst with Swedish Military Intelligence and as Public Affairs Adviser with the Office of the High Representative in Bosnia-Hercegovina.

As correspondent in the Balkans Palme became known for his impartial coverage of the Yugoslav wars. When the UN Security Council created the International Criminal Tribunal for the Former Yugoslavia (ICTY) in 1993 in The Hague, Palme was one of the first journalists to understand its significance. In the following years he wrote a large number of features in Dagens Nyheter on the war crimes tribunal and in 2002 he summarized his observations in the book Om ondskan i vår tid – Sökandet efter rättvisa på Balkan (Evil in Our time – The Quest for Justice in the Balkans), which was hailed by newspaper reviewers as one of the best books on the Balkan wars published in Sweden. He later followed up the discussion of war crimes in the Balkans with the documentary film Peace Without Justice (with Bengt Nilsson, produced and financed by Swedish public service TV Sveriges Television (2003)). In 2004 Christian Palme was awarded the Eldh-Ekblad Peace Prize by the Swedish Peace and Arbitration Society (Svenska Freds- och skiljedomsföreningen) in recognition of his groundbreaking journalism promoting the emerging international criminal justice system.

In 2004 Christian Palme left Dagens Nyheter to become Public Information Adviser in the Office of the Prosecutor of the International Criminal Court (ICC) in The Hague. In 2007 he returned to Sweden and after a spell as project manager with a private communications agency he was appointed Media and Communications Adviser with the Nordic Africa Institute, a government thinktank and centre of excellence for research on modern Africa, based in Uppsala, Sweden. In 2010 he was awarded the Swedish Publishing Award for his work shaping the Nordic Africa Institute Annual Report 2009.

== Bibliography ==
- Vägen mot rättvisa – De nya krigsförbrytartribunalerna/The Road to Justice – The New War Crimes Tribunals (2000)
- Om ondskan i vår tid – Sökandet efter rättvisa på Balkan/Evil in Our Time – The Quest for Justice in the Balkans (2002)

== Filmography ==
- Laglös fred/Peace Without Justice (2003)

== Awards ==
- Eldh-Ekblad Peace Prize 2004
- Swedish Publishing Award 2010
