= Helene Schmitz =

Swedish photographer (born 1960)

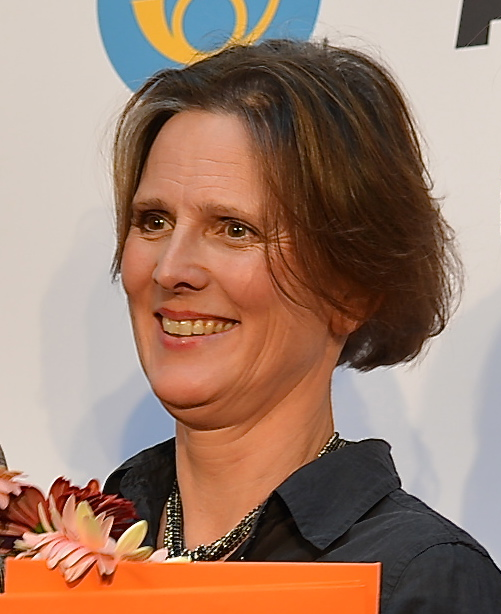
- Born: 1960 (age 65–66); Stockholm, Sweden
- Known for: Photography
- Awards: Photographer of the Year (Swedish Environmental Protection Agency, 2006); Swedish Publishing Award (2007, 2012); Diploma from The Royal Swedish Library and Swedish Book Art (2007)

Helene Schmitz is a Swedish photographer born 1960. In her work, Helene Schmitz is interested in how nature is described in science, art and literature. Schmitz investigates how these activities filters our understanding and her work often makes us question our preconceptions of nature. After graduating with a BA in History of Art and Cinema, she started working with photography. Schmitz held exhibitions in Scandinavia and in France and her pictures have been published world-wide in National Geographic.

In February 2015, her largest solo exhibition took place at Dunkers kulturhus in Helsingborg, with photos from four of her latest projects.

== Exhibitions ==
In France, Schmitz has been represented in several international group exhibitions, including an open-air exhibition in Jardin des Plantes in 2007, Transphotographiques in Lille (2009) and Arts and Nature in Daumain de Chaumont sur Loire in 2011. In Sweden, Schmitz's works have been exhibited at galleries as well as public locations. A semi-permanent collection of her plant portraits was shown in Stockholms subway station Mariatorget during 2012–13.

Schmitz's photographs have been published in a number of international books and magazines including the New York-based magazine Cabinet, which published photos from Schmitz's Kudzu Project in 2014. Helene Schmitz's work is represented at The Swedish Museum of Modern Art in Stockholm.

== Books ==
Part of Schmitz's time is dedicated to publishing photography books. Schmitz's first book Blow Up was published in 2003 and showed extreme close-ups on plants. Blow Up was nominated to the prestigious Swedish Literary prize August Price. In 2007, Schmitz published her second book A Passion for Systems - Linnaeus and the Dream of Order. The photos from this book were published world-wide in National Geographic, and the book was translated into English, French and Japanese. Schmitz's latest book Ur Regnskogens Skugga was published in 2011 and nominated for Augustpriset in 2012. It also received the Swedish Publishing Prize in 2012.

== Prizes and awards ==
In 2003, Schmitz's book Blow Up was nominated to the Swedish Literary prize August Price. In 2006 Schmitz received the award Photographer of the Year by the Swedish Environmental Protection Agency for her photographs in the book A Passion for Systems - Linnaeus and the Dream of Order.

In 2007, A Passion for Systems - Linnaeus and the Dream of Order (Swedish edition) won the Swedish Publishing Award in the category Magnificent Work. In 2007, A Passion for Systems - Linnaeus and the Dream of Order also received a diploma from The Royal Swedish Library (Kungliga Biblioteket) and Swedish Book Art (Svensk Bokkonst), the award was given with the motivation "Beautiful photographs and a design that creates a serene context".

In 2014 Schmitz was a finalist in the international photography competition "Prix de la Photo Camera Clara".
