= Per Palme =

Swedish art historian

Per Olof Palme (7 November 1914 – 1983) was a Swedish art historian.

He was born in Sigtuna as a brother of Sven Ulric Palme and first cousin of Prime Minister Olof Palme.

In his early career, Per Palme studied under Gregor Paulsson and contributed to the multi-volume work Svensk stad. Liv och stil i svenska städer under 1800-talet. He took the fil.dr. degree at Uppsala University in 1956 with the doctoral thesis The Triumph of Peace. A Study of the Whitehall Banqueting House, i.e. the Banqueting House by Inigo Jones. Palme was subsequently appointed as a docent at University of Gothenburg in 1957, before becoming professor of art history at the University of Oslo in 1962, serving until his death in 1983. He was inducted into the Norwegian Academy of Science and Letters in 1963.
