= Giacomo Brunelli =

Italian artist working with photography

Giacomo Brunelli (born 1977) is a British/Italian artist working with photography, who lives in London.

Brunelli has published the following books of film noir and street photography black and white photographs: The Animals (2008 and 2016), Eternal London (2014), Self Portraits (2016), New York (2020), Hamburg (2021) and Venice (2022). His work has been exhibited at The Barbican Centre, The Photographers' Gallery and The New Art Gallery Walsall in the UK and at Blue Sky Gallery in Portland, OR, USA. His work is held in the collections of The New Art Gallery Walsall, Portland Art Museum, Museum of Fine Arts, Houston and Kiyosato Museum of Photographic Arts in Japan.

== Early life and education ==
Brunelli was born in Perugia, Italy. He grew up in the countryside and spent his childhood playing with animals. He graduated from university in Communications and took a six-month course in photojournalism in Rome where he had been living before moving to London.

== Art/photography ==
Brunelli's medium is gelatin silver prints and he is a printer. He photographs with a Miranda Sensomat camera—a 35 mm SLR made in 1962 once belonged to his father, an amateur photographer. In a recent talk, he mentioned Italian Renaissance, Italian Medieval Art and street photography as his major influences.

In 2021, Brunelli's image of the dog was used as the cover of the script of the movie The Power of the Dog, directed by Jane Campion starring Benedict Cumberbatch, Kirsten Dunst and Kodi Smit-Mcphee. In the same year, New York publisher Assouline releases the book of the movie, The Power of the Dog, with Brunelli's dog photograph in it.

In 2016, Brunelli's image of the snarling dog was used in the movie The 9th Life of Louis Drax, directed by Alexandre Aja, during Jamie Dornan's hypnosis.

=== The Animals (2004–2008) ===
Brunelli has photographed "animals in the countryside, backyards, fields and farms since 2004" in Italy. He calls this series "animal-focused street photography". His film noir aesthetic makes them "seem singled out or stopped in their tracks". He gets as close as his camera will allow, which "forces the animals to either flight or fight," at which point he photographs them. "It is all about capturing that moment of reaction, triggered through various approaches that vary from animal to animal. Whether it is ignoring them, running after them or using their natural curiosity for the shot."

In 2008, The New Art Gallery Walsall will present his first museum show and in the same year Dewi Lewis Publishing publishes the series.

=== Eternal London (2012–2014) ===
In 2012, he was commissioned by The Photographers' Gallery in London to make the Eternal London series, which he worked on every day for two years creating a body of work between film noir, street photography and sculpture . The book was selected by Martin Parr and included in the "Strange and Familiar" exhibition at the Barbican Centre in London in 2017. Again using his film noir style, the silhouettes of people and animals are set against well known London landmarks.[6] After following a person he wishes to photograph, "working discreetly, Brunelli often uses a removable viewfinder, to be able to photograph his subjects from waist height and other unusual angles, such as directly from behind and with extreme close-up", obscuring their faces.[6] He uses "light, shadow and contrast to imbue his images with a dramatic atmosphere and a feeling of claustrophobia."[6] In 2014 The Photographers' Gallery will exhibit the work in a solo show.

=== Self Portraits (2010–2013) ===
In the summer 2010, while searching for animals in Umbria, Brunelli noticed his shadow projected on a white road and decided to start the Self Portraits series, which it will be completed in 2013. Brunelli says that he took inspiration from Arte Povera. The project will be published in Paris by Editions Bessard in 2016.

=== Hamburg (2015) ===
In 2015, Deichtorhallen museum commissioned Brunelli to work on the city of Hamburg and the series will be exhibited at Robert Morat Galerie and published in 2021 by Editions Bessard (Paris).

=== New York City (2017–2019) ===
Between 2017 and 2019 he has produced his latest body of work to date on New York City, exhibited at The Photographers'Gallery in London in October 2019 and published in 2020 by Skinnerboox (Italy).

=== Venice (2020-2022) ===
Brunelli worked in Venice (Italy) between 2020 and 2022 for a project that he self-published in June 2022 under his own publishing house called Tantopress (London, Uk)

== Publications ==
=== Books of work by Brunelli ===
- Venice. London: TantoPress, 2022. ISBN 978-1-3999-2387-3.
- Hamburg. Paris: Bessard, 2021. ISBN 979-10-91406-99-4.
- New York. Skinnerboox. Jesi, 2020. ISBN 978-88-94895-31-5.
- The Animals. Stockport: Dewi Lewis, 2008. ISBN 978-1904587712. With an introduction by Alison Nordström.
  - Second expanded edition. Stockport: Dewi Lewis, 2016. ISBN 978-1-911306-08-5. With a foreword by Nordström.
- Eternal London. Stockport: Dewi Lewis, 2014. ISBN 978-1907893520.
  - Second edition. Stockport: Dewi Lewis, 2016. ISBN 978-1907893520.
- Self Portraits. Paris: Bessard, 2016. OCLC 989522536.

=== Books with contributions by Brunelli ===
- Bird. Hoxton Mini Press, 2022 written by Gemma Padley.
- The Power of the Dog. Assouline, 2021 book from the movie by Jane Campion.
- Strange and Familiar. Barbican Centre, Prestel 2017. by Martin Parr.
- Keeper of the Hearth. Schilt, 2020.
- Unseen London. Hoxton Mini Press, 2019.
- Masters of Street Photography. Ammonite, 2019.
- Mono Vol.2. Gomma, 2016.

== Awards ==
- 2008: Winner, Nature category, Sony World Photography Awards, Cannes, for a photograph of a snarling dog

== Solo exhibitions ==
- The Animals, The New Art Gallery Walsall, Walsall, UK, 2008; Blue Sky Gallery, Portland, OR; The Photographers' Gallery, London, 2010; Transphotographiques, Lille, France, 2011.
- Eternal London, The Photographers' Gallery, London, 2014.

== Collections ==
Brunelli's work is held in the following public collections:

- Kiyosato Museum of Photographic Arts, Hokuto, Japan: 4 prints (as of May 2018)
- Museum of Fine Arts, Houston, TX: 1 print (as of May 2018)
- The New Art Gallery Walsall, Walsall, UK: 3 prints (as of May 2018)
- Portland Art Museum, Portland, OR: 2 prints
