= Anecdotes de Suède =

1716 work of political satire

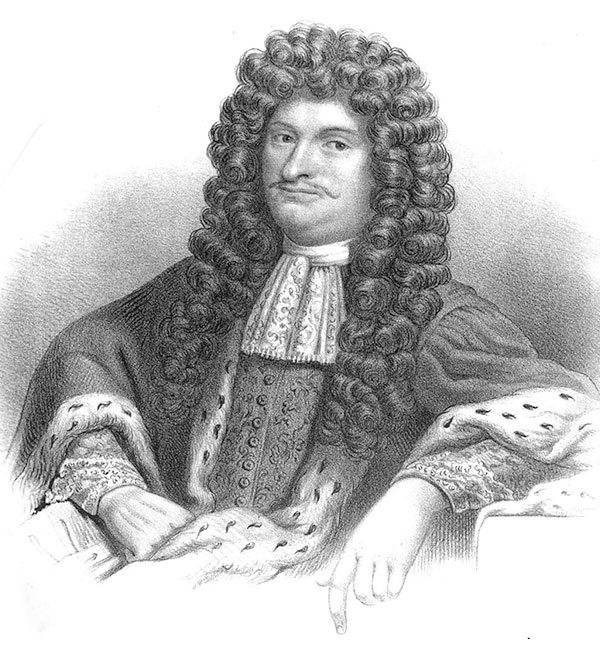
Johan Göransson Gyllenstierna lithograph by Johan Henric Strömer

(Les) Anecdotes de Suède ("Swedish Anecdotes") is a political satire written against the Swedish regime of the 1680s. Probably dating to the end of that decade, it was first published in French, in two volumes, in 1716, under the full title Les anecdotes de Suede, ou Histoire secrette des changemens arrivés dans ce royaume, sous le regne de Charles XI. It subsequently appeared in German, English, and finally Swedish translations. Various men have been suggested to be the author, including the German jurist Samuel von Pufendorf (1632–1694), whose name was on the German edition, but the issue remains unsettled. It is one of the most controversial historical representations of the Swedish Empire, railing against the Great Reduction of 1680 in Sweden and especially sharply against Johan Gyllenstierna.

== Background and description ==
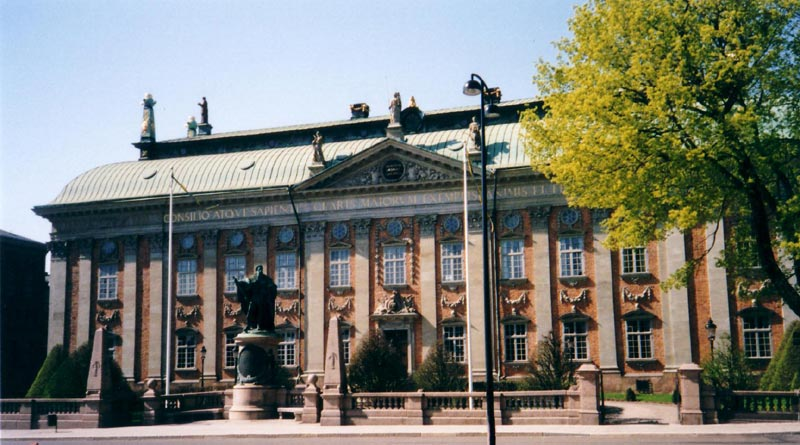
The Swedish House of Nobility, seat of the Swedish nobility

The full title of the book is Les anecdotes de Suede, ou Histoire secrette des changemens arrivés dans ce royaume, sous le regne de Charles XI (The anecdotes of Sweden or the secret history of the changes occurred in Sweden under the reign of Charles XI). The book was written under the regime of Charles XI of Sweden, when the Crown recaptured lands earlier granted to the nobility. The reductions had been fought for by gentry, tradesmen, state servants, and peasantry alike, partly as a way to curb the power of the great aristocratic families and partly as a way to make the state solvent and able to pay its debts. The book describes the Riksdag of the Estates assembled by Charles XI in 1680 and the events that led to reduction. Sweden's weak economy had suffered during the Scanian War and was in a deep crisis. At this session of the assembly, which has been described as one of the most important, the king finally pushed through the reduction of aristocratic land holdings, which had been discussed in the Riksdag since 1650. The decision meant that any land or other holding previously owned by the crown and lent or given away — including counties, baronies and lordships — could be recovered. The ruling affected many nobles, some of whom were ruined. The reduction process involved the examination of every title deed in the kingdom — including the dominions — and resulted in the complete readjustment of the nation's finances.

Les Anecdotes de Suède is a polemic against autocracy and against the man who is seen as the pioneer of reduction, Johan Gyllenstierna. Gyllenstierna's father was Nils Gyllenstierna, a highborn diplomat and Lord High Chancellor of Sweden who became the first to receive the title Rikskansler, but his family had not benefitted from the largesse of the most recent regimes. The Lord High Chancellor was appointed by the King and was assigned to ensure that the orders of the King and the Riksdag of the Estates were followed. In 1680, Charles XI abolished the office then held by Magnus Gabriel De la Gardie, who was from a wealthy family, and inaugurated a new position instead: "President of the Chancellery". Gyllenstierna had recently gained an influential social position, having been made a Count in 1674. Gyllenstierna's personal interest contributed to his concern for the recovery of crown lands and in strengthening the crown against the wealthy longstanding aristocratic families. He was the spokesman of the gentry against the plutocrats, whose privileges he wished to see reduced or eliminated. The author of Les Anecdotes de Suède expresses his fear of the "Men of power", drawing on his own observations, traditional material and contemporary propaganda but also on some written records.

== Author and publication ==
The book was probably written in 1687 or 1688, with the publishing location given as The Hague and Stockholm; however, the actual locations for the first two editions in French were Ulm and Utrecht. It was later translated into English and German, and a Swedish translation made by Karl Nyrén in 1761 was published in 1822.

The author's name is given on the cover and on the German translation as Samuel von Pufendorf. Von Pufendorf (1632–94) was called to Stockholm as historiographer-royal in 1677. The Herzog August Library in Wolfenbüttel holds one of his manuscripts. Some historians have believed he was in fact the author. However, according to G. Schauman, Olof Palme and Nils Ahnlund, the author was Johan Paulin Olivecrantz (1633–1707), a Swedish diplomat, who used von Pufendorf's name and identity to publish the book. Other scholars have suggested Samuel von Pufendorf's brother, Esaias von Pufendorf, or possibly a French resident in Sweden called La Piquetière.

== See also ==
- Rosencrantz and Guildenstern the Guildenstern character's name was inspired from Gyldenstjerne/Gyllenstierna ("golden star") the name of a Swedish noble family of the 16th century.
