= Hédi Fried =

Swedish-Romanian author and psychologist (1924–2022)

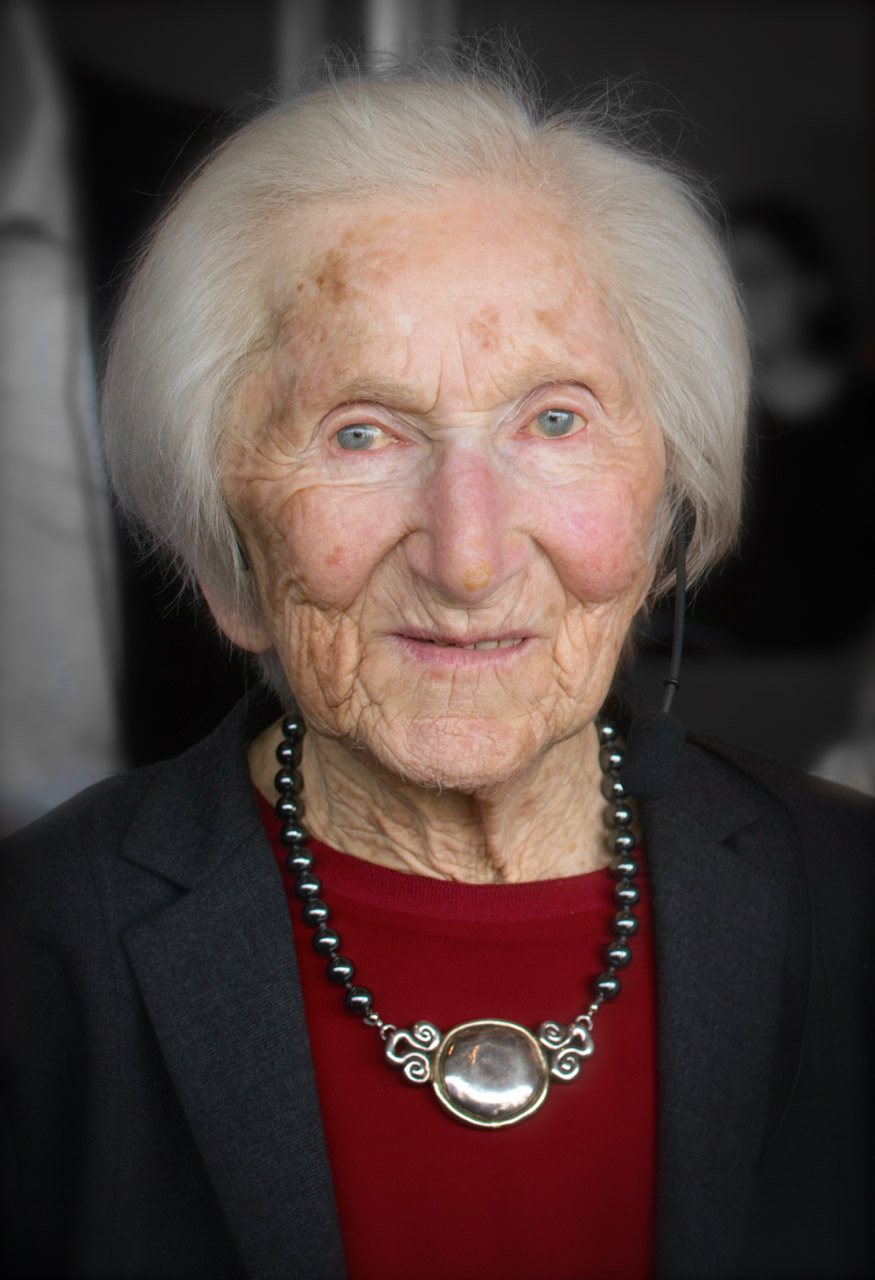
- Fried in 2015
- Born: Hédi Szmuk; 15 June 1924; Sighet, Romania
- Died: 19 November 2022 (aged 98); Stockholm, Sweden
- Occupations: Writer, psychologist

Hédi Fried (née Szmuk; 15 June 1924 – 19 November 2022) was a Swedish-Romanian-Hungarian author and psychologist. A Holocaust survivor, she passed through Auschwitz as well as Bergen-Belsen, coming to Sweden in July 1945 with the boat M/S Rönnskär.

Fried died in November 2022, at the age of 98.

== Awards ==
- The Seraphim Medal (Sweden: 2019)
- The Medal Illis Quorum in gold of the 8th size (Sweden; 1998)
- Officer's Cross of the Order of Merit of the Federal Republic of Germany (2017)
- Knight of the Order of the Star of Romania (2016)
- The Swedish Europe-movement award European of the Year (1997)
- Natur & Kultur Culture Award (1998)
- Swedish Peace and Arbitration Society's Eldh-Ekblad Peace Prize (1999)
- Honorary Doctor of Stockholm University (2002)
- Raoul Wallenberg Academy's award Raoul Wallenberg Prize (2015)
- Olof Palme Prize from the Olof Palme Memorial Fund (2017)

== Books of Hédi Fried ==
- 1992 – Skärvor av ett liv. Vägen till och från Auschwitz, Natur & Kultur, ISBN 91-27-02963-8
- 1995 – Livet tillbaka, Natur & Kultur, ISBN 91-27-05353-9
- 2002 – Ett tredje liv: från jordbävning i själen till meningsfull tillvaro, Natur & Kultur, ISBN 91-27-09280-1
- 2003 – Livets pendel. Fragment, erfarenheter, insikter, Lärarhandledning Natur & Kultur, ISBN 91-27-09398-0
- 2017 – Frågor jag fått om Förintelsen, Natur & Kultur, ISBN 978-91-27-15085-0
- 2019 – Historien om Bodri, Natur & Kultur, ISBN 978-91-27-16125-2
