= Johan Persson (photographer) =

Swedish photographer (born 1982)

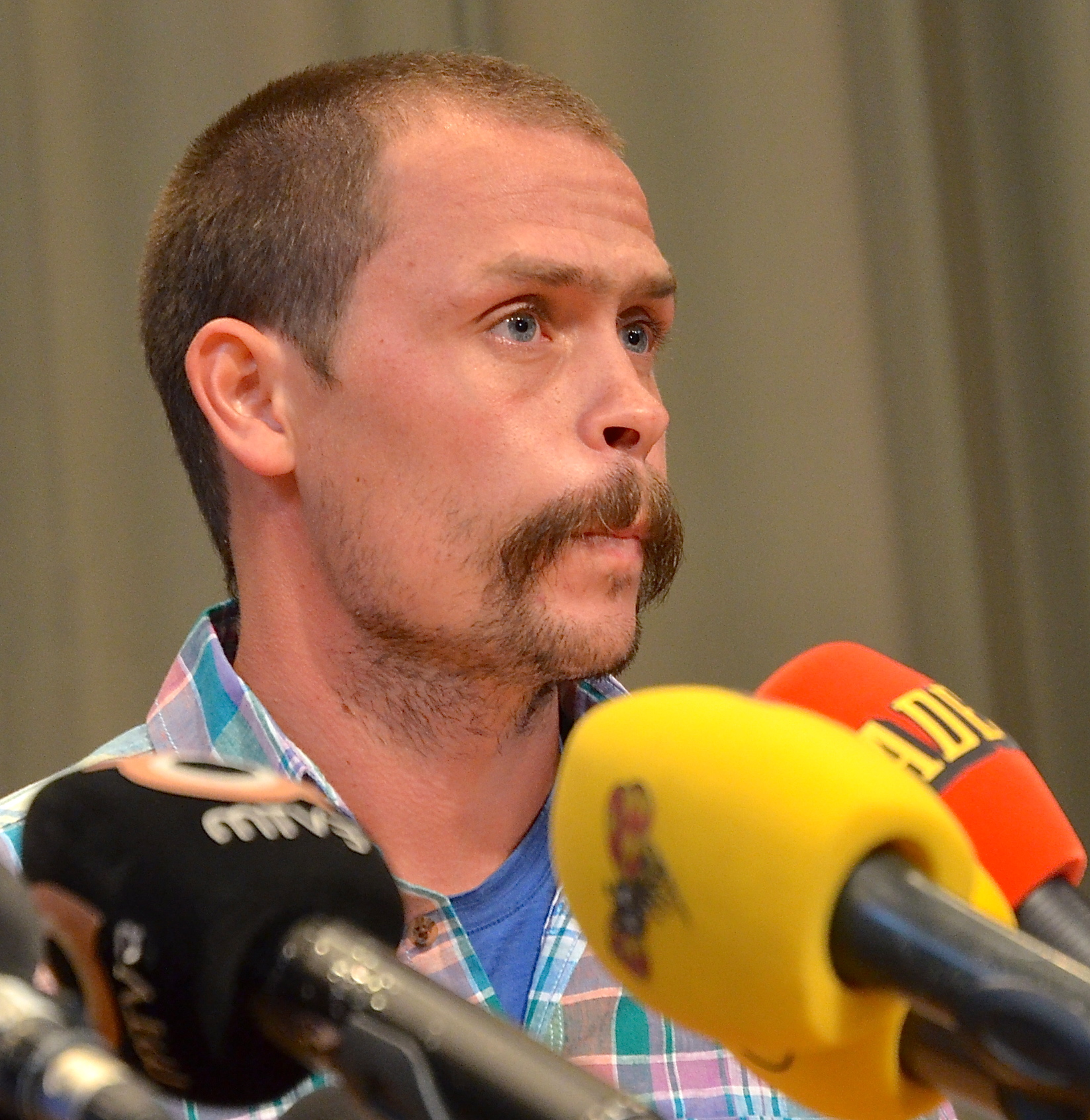
Johan Persson at the press conference in the ABF building in Stockholm on September 14, 2012.

Johan Karl Persson (born March 3, 1982) is a Swedish photographer who was convicted by the Ethiopian government to eleven years in prison for what it claimed were terrorist crimes. Persson was sentenced on December 27, 2011, but was later pardoned and released on September 10, 2012.

== Career ==
Persson studied at the School of Photography at Studium in Gothenburg, Sweden. Since he completed his education Persson has worked as a freelance photographer starting with reportage pictures of Skinheads of Beijing that can be seen through Photo Agency Kontinent He has collaborated with journalist Anna Roxvall during many years. Together they have produced highly praised articles about neo-Nazis in the United States and Mexican undocumented immigrants returning home published by Svenska Dagbladet (SvD). In addition, they reported on culture and politics in various African countries: refugee camps in the Democratic Republic of the Congo, speed trained amateur doctors in Malawi, sowing seeds for democracy in southern Sudan, pirate fishing in Cameroon and Botswana Heavy Metal generation.

=== Arrested for suspicion of terrorist crimes in Ethiopia ===
It was on July 1 that photographer Johan Persson and reporter Martin Schibbye were arrested by Ethiopian security forces while Persson and Schibbye were crossing the border from Somalia to Ethiopia in an attempt to make a report in the closed Ethiopian region of Ogaden. The purpose of the trip was to confirm information they previously received from refugees about human rights violations in Ogaden. On September 7 they were charged with the suspicion of terrorism offenses and for illegally entering the Ogaden region from Somalia. In December, Persson and Schibbye were sentenced to 11 years in jail.

Amnesty International demanded on December 21, 2011, to release immediately and unconditionally two Swedish journalists convicted by an Ethiopian court despite their legitimate journalistic work.

On September 10, 2012, they were pardoned and released. Persson returned to Sweden on September 14, 2012, and subsequently held a press conference together with Martin Schibbye, telling about their time in Ethiopia.

== Awards ==
Persson was nominated for the Swedish Red Cross Journalist Prize for 2011. He won third prize for Third prize in International Daily Life singles, Picture of the Year, Neo-Nazis in USA.
