= Jan-Erik Wikström =

Swedish publisher and politician (1931–2024)

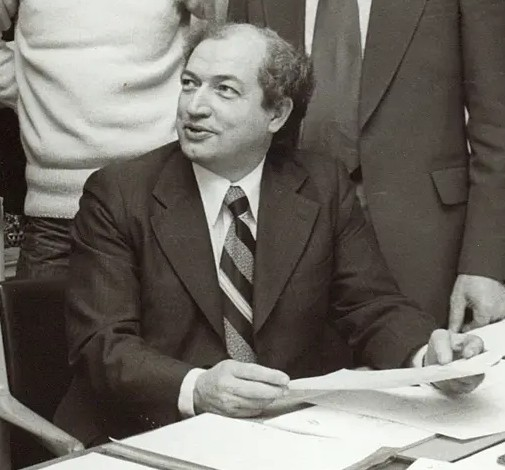

Minister for Education
- In office 1976–1982

Member of Parliament
- In office 1971–1974, 1976–1992

Governor of Uppsala County
- In office 1992–1997

Personal details
- Born: 11 September 1932
- Died: 1 July 2024 (aged 91)
- Spouses: Grethel Wikström; Inger Wikström; Cecilia Wikström
- Occupation: Publisher

Jan-Erik Wikström (11 September 1932 – 1 July 2024) was a Swedish publisher and politician, who served as Minister for Education between 1976 and 1982.

His father, Börje Wikström, was a pastor in the Swedish Evangelical Mission (EFS) and his mother, Essy Wikström, was an elementary school teacher.

Wikström was head of the publishing house Gummessons from 1963 to 1976. He was elected into the Swedish Parliament in 1970, representing the People's Party (subsequently the Liberals). He became Minister for Education in the Fälldin I Cabinet in 1976, and remained on that post in the cabinets Fälldin II, Ullsten and Fälldin III, with a brief stint as acting Minister of Commerce and Industry in 1981. When the Social Democratic second Cabinet of Olof Palme took over after the 1982 Swedish general election, Wikström left the government.

He was appointed Governor of Uppsala County in 1992, and held the position until his retirement in 1997.

Wikström was married three times: to teacher and author Grethel Wikström from 1955 to 1979, to concert pianist Inger Wikström between 1980 and 1990, and to priest and politician Cecilia Wikström from 1995 to 2010. Photographer Jeppe Wikström is his son from his first marriage. Wikström died on 1 July 2024, at the age of 91.

Government offices
Preceded by Bertil Zachrisson	Minister for Education; 1976–1982	Succeeded by Lena Hjelm-Wallén
Preceded by Staffan Burenstam Linder	Minister of Commerce and Industry (interim); May 1981	Succeeded by Björn Molin
