= Greta Engkvist =

Swedish peace activist and educator

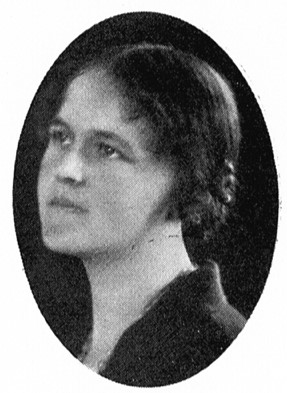
Greta Engkvist

Greta Sigrid Elisabeth Engkvist née Johansson (1893–1990) was a Swedish peace activist and educator. In 1920, she joined the Swedish branch of the Women's International League for Peace and Freedom, serving as secretary from 1928 to 1938. From October 1931 to September 1932, she travelled around the world, making contact with peace organizations in the places she visited. From 1939, she was a member of the peace foundation Stiftelsen Fredshögskolan (Peace High School), which contributed to peace work by means of education and by conducting peace research. Engkvist later became the organization's principal, a position she maintained until 1983 when she was 90. In 1968, she was awarded the peace prize Eldh-Ekblad Peace Prize.

== Early life, education and family ==
Born on 3 October 1893 in Vissefjärda to the west of Kalmar, Greta Sigrid Elisabeth Johansson was the daughter of Gustaf Hjalmar Johansson, a provincial official, and his wife Sigrid née Forsell who ran a sewing shop. She was the eldest of the family's five children. In 1908 the family moved to Kalmar where Greta attended the girls' school before spending two years at Stockholm's private co-educational school Whitlockska samskolan. She went on to earn an elementary school teaching certificate from Rostads folkskoleseminarium in 1912. From 1923 to 1927, she studied languages at the University of Uppsala, earning a master's degree. In 1917, she married the builder Olle Engkvist with whom she adopted a son, Gunnar Wilhelm Engkvist né Stam. The marriage was dissolved in 1932.

== Career ==
Greta Engkvist held temporary teaching jobs from 1913 to 1918, marrying Olle Engkvist (the future building magnate) in 1917 and adopting his surname. In 1921, thanks to a scholarship that Olle had been awarded by the National Board of Trade, the couple travelled for nine months in Germany, Italy, France and England. Greta Engkvist became increasingly interested in the peace movement, joining the Swedish branch of the Women's International League for Peace and Freedom in 1920. After she had completed her studies, in 1928 she was encouraged by the peace activist Matilda Widegren to serve as the organization's secretary, a post she maintained until 1938. In that capacity, she lectured on the cause for peace and recruited new members.

In the early 1930s, Greta and her husband decided to divorce, while remaining good friends. To satisfy Swedish regulations, they had to live apart for at least six months. To facilitate the separation, Olle arranged and paid for a world trip for Greta. In October 1931, she travelled to Berlin and Paris where she met Mahatma Gandhi. In Geneva she attended the debates of the League of Nations. Taking a ship in Marseille, she visited India, Burma, Singapore, Indonesia, China, Korea and Japan. She returned to Sweden via Hawaii, the Panama Canal, Cuba and New York. At each of her destinations, she visited the YWCA or the Salvation Army and contacted organizations involved in peace work.

Reviewing Elias Tohenkin's book The People Want Peace in the journal Fellowship in June 1938, Lyn Smith stated that Tohenkin referred to Engkvist as "Second in command of the women's peace army in Sweden" and quotes Engkvist as stating "We believe that we ought to let the world know that we women do not want war, that we believe there is no cause or grievance in the world that can justify the chaos and destruction of another war."

From 1939, Engkvist was a member of the peace foundation Stiftelsen Fredshögskolan [sv] (Peace High School), which contributed to peace work by means of education and by conducting peace research. She later became the organization's principal, a position she maintained until 1983 when she was 90. She wrote articles for the women's rights organization Svenska Kvinnors Medborgarförbund, often emphasizing her concern for peace. As a member of Social Democratic Women in Sweden, she dealt with matters of international interest, while serving as an effective representative of the National Council of Swedish Women's peace committee. During the 1930s. she visited the Soviet Union on three occasions.

After World War II, in 1949 Engkvist worked as a guidance consellor on the professional education of Polish Jewish refugees from concentration camps in connection with the Swedish ORT Committee. In 1964, she was an observer at a United Nations seminar on human rights in Kabul, Afghanistan, promoting equality between women and men.

Greta Engkvist died in Stockholm on 30 May 1990.

== Publications ==
Among Engkvist's publications are:

- Så började vi --- : Greta Engkvist om Fredshögskolan (1982)
- Att se tillbaka vid 94 : minnen från ett liv för freden (1988)
