= Olle Engkvist =

Swedish building contractor and architect

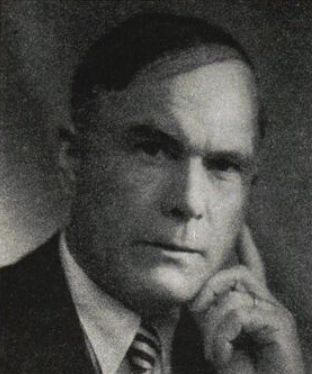
- Engkvist, circa 1944
- Born: Olof Theodor Engkvist; 31 May 1889; Uppsala, Uppsala County, Sweden
- Died: 22 February 1969 (aged 79)
- Occupation: Architect
- Spouses: Greta Johansson (m. 1917; div. 1934) Signhild Englund (m. 1937)
- Children: Gunnar Engkvist (adopted)

Olle Engkvist, full name Olof Theodor Engkvist, (31 May 1889 - 22 February 1969) was a prominent Swedish building contractor and architect, and founder of the company by the same name.

== Early life ==
Born the son of a bricklayer in Uppsala, and raised in Gävle, Engkvist attended the Brunnsvik Folk Highschool (Brunnsviks folkhögskola), and later a technical school from which he graduated in 1918. Engkvist started his building career as a brick-layer, was a union official, and from early on identified as a social democrat.

== The Olle Engkvist company ==
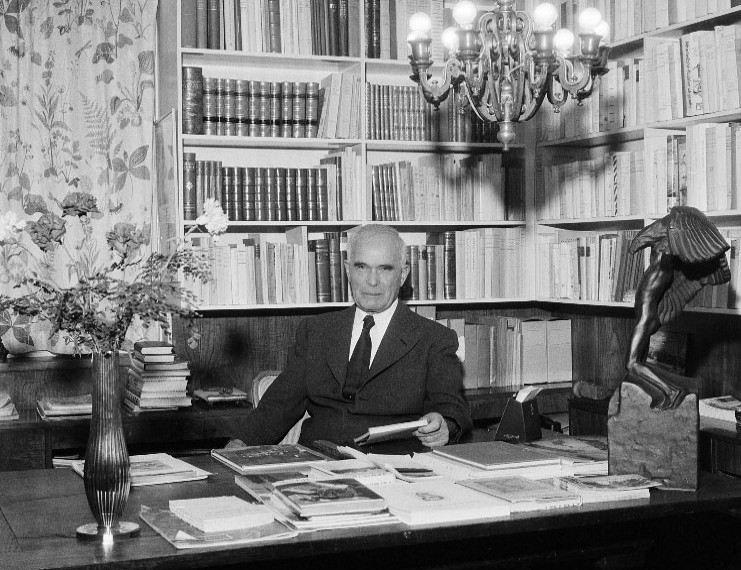
Olle Engkvist, taken at his home in Gröndal in 1957

By 1919 Engkvist had qualified as a certified builder, and in 1922 he founded his own building company, which three of his brothers worked also. Engkvist's company went on to become one of the largest in Stockholm, taking on a range of projects including the reconstruction of the Swedish parliament building, the Rikdagshuset in 1938-42. Between 1938 and 1956 Engkvist's company built at least five "collective houses" (also called "service houses", or servicehus) featuring communal restaurants and laundries.

In the decades after the founding of his company, Engkvist became a campaigner against what he saw as excessive regulation, particularly under Sweden's left-wing post-war governments. Abandoning his previous left-wing beliefs, Engkvist became a conservative. On the 30th anniversary of the founding of his company in 1952, he resigned control of his company turning it over to colleagues, and declared that this was because the "spirit of the age" under what he described as the "'New Deal' in Sweden" was "crushing initiative". Engkvist subsequently retired to live in an 18th century mansion.

== Personal life ==
In 1917 Engkvist was married to (future pacifist and educator) Greta Johansson, with whom he adopted a son called Gunnar (born 1924).

The couple travelled widely, spending nine months in 1921 travelling on a scholarship from the Kommerskollegium, visiting Germany, Italy, France, and the United Kingdom. However, by the 1930's they had grown apart. Olle Engkvist offered to pay for Greta to travel in Asia, and she spent 11 months from October 1931 to September 1932 travelling to Asia, and then back again via the US, circumnavigating the globe. By 1934 Engkvist had divorced Greta, and in 1937 he was married to Signhild Englund.

Engkvist had planned to spend his declining years at the servicehus his company had built in Hässelby, however he died in 1969 before he could move there.

== Legacy ==
Despite rumours reported in 1963 by the newspaper Västerort that a lane in Engkvist's servicehus project in Hässelby had been named Olle Byggares gata ("Olle the builder's street"), it was not until 1975 that the local government in Hässelby approved the naming of a street after Olle Engkvist.

As of 2024, the Olle Engkvist Foundation remained a major funder of research in Sweden, focusing on funding research in the areas of medicine, natural sciences, technology and the humanities.
