= Olof Palme (historian) =

Finnish historian (1884–1918)

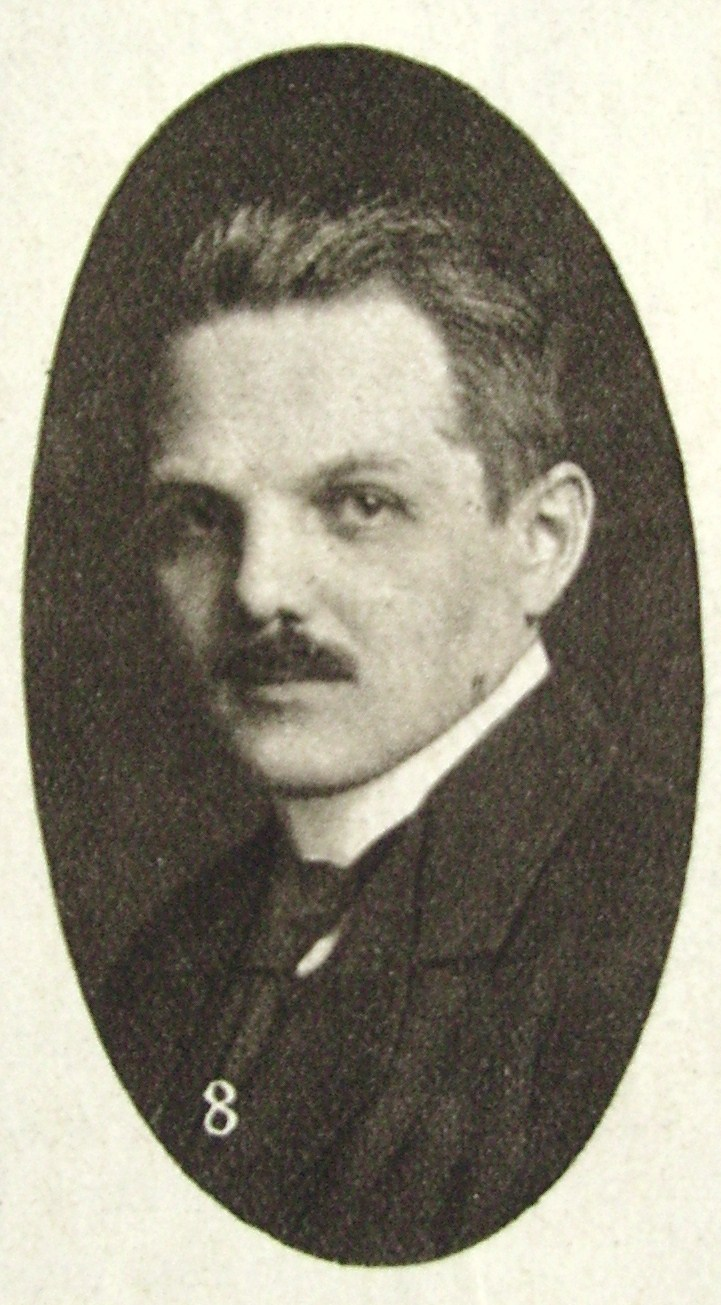
- Born: Olof Palme; 21 September 1884; Porvoo, Grand Duchy of Finland
- Died: 3 April 1918 (aged 33); Tampere, Finland
- Cause of death: Killed in action
- Resting place: Sigtuna
- Occupation: Historian
- Parents: Sven Palme; Hanna Palme

Olof Palme (21 September 1884 – 3 April 1918) was a Swedish historian and one of the organizers of the voluntary Swedish Brigade, which fought for the Whites during the 1918 Finnish Civil War. He was the uncle of Olof Palme, the prime minister of Sweden, who was murdered in 1986.

== Life ==
Palme was born in Porvoo, Finland as the son of the Swedish politician and artillery officer Sven Palme and Fenno-Swede Hanna von Born. He went to school in Stockholm and later studied history at the University of Uppsala. Palme took part of the archaeological excavations in the Medieval Sigtuna and was the founder of the 1916 established Sigtuna museum.

Palme was known as a keen anti-socialist who was radicalized after the 1906 Hakaniemi riot in Helsinki. He was openly racist and has been described as a proto-fascist. Palme viewed the Finns as racially inferior and having benefitted from the Swedish colonisation of Finland. In January 1918 Palme organized the voluntary Swedish Brigade to join the Finnish Civil War, fighting aside with the Finnish White Guards. Palme was among the Swedish volunteers who viewed their efforts in racist terms as being part of a struggle to save Swedish culture. In a 1917 pamphlet, Palme openly referred to Finns as savages.

"In every Finn there hides, in spite of centuries of cultivation, a bit of barbarian, which for a long time yet, as until now, will require care and discipline."

He was killed by the Reds in the Battle of Tampere in April 1918. Palme was buried in Sigtuna.

== Family ==
Olof Palme was the brother of the military officer Nils Palme and the businessman Gunnar Palme (1886–1934), who was the father of the prime minister Olof Palme. He was married to Ola Tenow. The couple had five children, Sven Ulric Palme (1912–1977) was known as a historian and Rutger Palme (1910–1995) as a politician. Among his grandchildren can be found the professor and writer Jacob Palme, the ambassador and writer Thomas Palme, the architect and writer Erik Palme and the journalist and writer Christian Palme.
