= Cecilia Wikström =

Swedish politician

Cecilia Wikström MEP
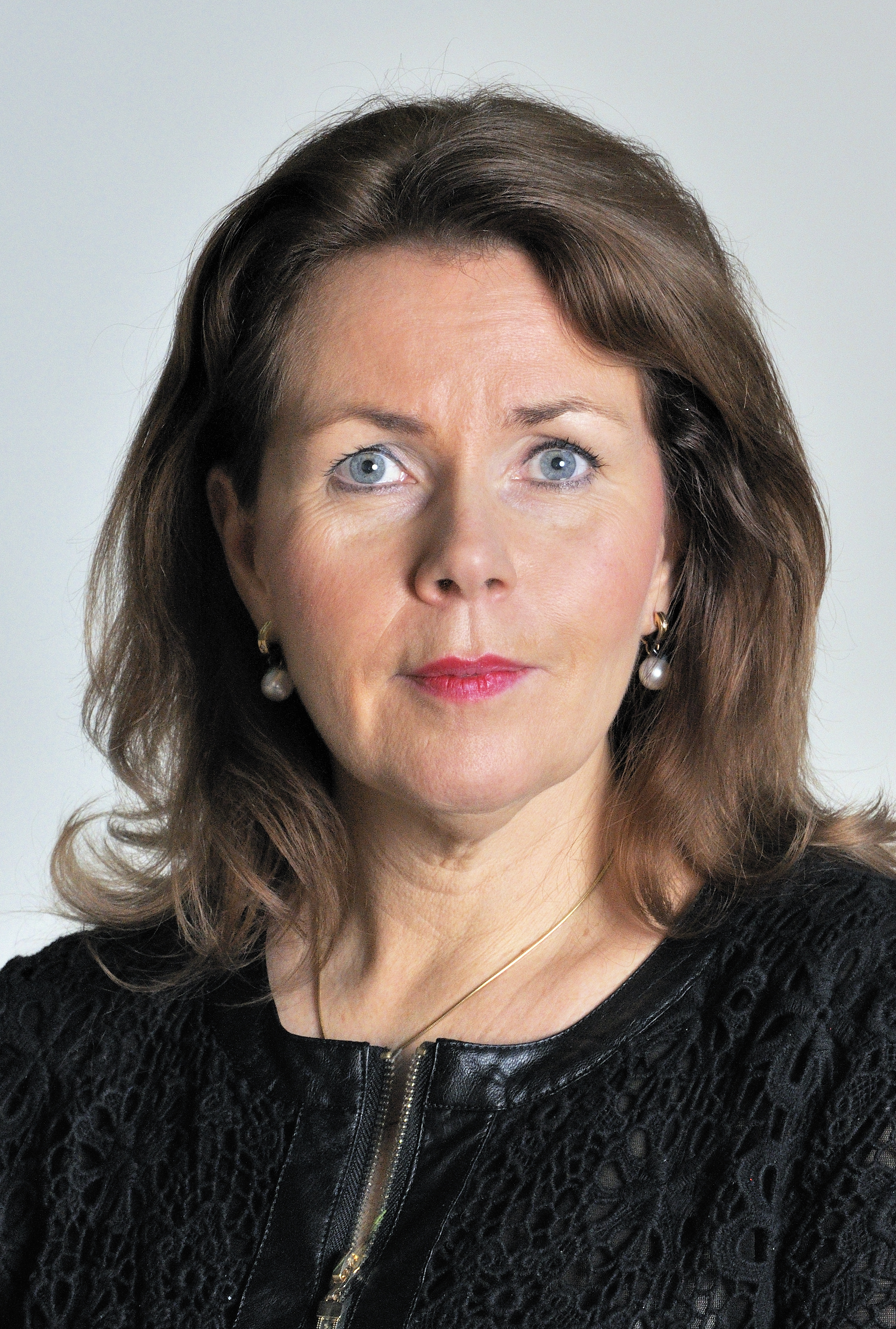
- Official portrait, 2014

Chair of the European Parliament Petitions Committee
- In office 7 July 2014 – 2 July 2019
- Preceded by: New position

Member of the European Parliament
- In office 14 July 2009 – 2 July 2019
- Constituency: Sweden

Member of the Swedish Parliament
- In office 30 September 2002 – 13 July 2009
- Constituency: Uppsala County

Personal details
- Born: Cecilia Karin Maria Sundström; 17 October 1965 (age 60) Övertorneå, Sweden
- Party: Swedish: Liberal Party; EU: Alliance of Liberals and Democrats for Europe
- Spouse(s): Björn Bolin; Jan-Erik Wikström
- Education: Uppsala University
- Website: www.ceciliawikstrom.eu

Video-Introduction

Cecilia Karin Maria Wikström (née Sundström, originally Nodbjörkborn, 17 October 1965) is a Swedish politician who served as Member of the European Parliament from 2009 until 2019. She is a member of the Liberal Party of Sweden, part of the Alliance of Liberals and Democrats for Europe.

She is also a priest in the Church of Sweden and the author of several books. She was married to former Swedish Minister for Education Jan-Erik Wikström from 1995 to 2010, and before that to the Swedish priest Björn Bolin.

Wikström got her Bachelor of Theology at the Department of Theology at Uppsala University in 1993. She has had various positions in the Church of Sweden, such as parish minister, university chaplain, prison chaplain, and canon of Uppsala Cathedral.

== Political career ==
=== Member of the Swedish Parliament, 2002–2009 ===
Between 2002 and 2009, Wikström was a member of the Swedish Parliament for the Liberal People's Party (today simply the Liberals). She was Deputy Chairman of the Committee on Cultural Affairs and substitute member of the Committee on Foreign Affairs. Wikström has been very engaged in questions relating to freedom of expression, in Sweden as well as in other countries.

In 2009 Wikström ran for the elections to the European Parliament on 7 June. She was the third name on the Swedish Liberal People's Party list and was elected to represent the party in the European Parliament. Hence, she left her post in the Swedish Parliament in July 2009.

=== Member of the European Parliament, 2009–2019 ===
Wikström is a Member of the European Parliament since 2009. She is a member of the European Parliament group Alliance of Liberals and Democrats for Europe (ALDE).

In the European Parliament, Wikström was from 2009 to 2014 a full member of the Committee on Civil Liberties, Justice and Home Affairs (LIBE) and the Committee on Legal Affairs (JURI), where she also is the coordinator of the ALDE group. In addition to her committee assignments, she was a member of the European Parliament's Advisory Committee on the Conduct of Members from 2012 until 2014.

In spring 2013, Wikström was appointed to represent the ALDE group in the delegation that negotiated a new agreement between the European Parliament and other institutions on how the European Parliament should have access to classified documents related to the common policy of security and foreign affairs.

She was a substitute member of the Delegation to the EU-Moldova Parliamentary Cooperation Committee, the Delegation to the ACP-EU Joint Parliamentary Assembly and the Delegation to the Euronest Parliamentary Assembly.

In the 2014-2019 legislature, Wikström was a full member of the Committee of Civil Liberties, Justice and Home Affairs (LIBE) and was formerly a substitute member of the Committee of Legal Affairs (JURI). On 7 July 2014, she was elected a chairwoman of the Committee for Petitions. From 2017, Wikström chaired the Conference of Committee Chairs. She was also a member of the European Parliament Intergroup on the Western Sahara and the European Parliament Intergroup on LGBT Rights. and vice-chair of the Intergroup for Disabled People.

On 29 March 2019 the Liberal Party decided on their list of candidates for the 2019 EU election, on which Wikström would not appear.

=== Candidacy for European Ombudsman ===
In 2019, Wikström was one of five candidates for the post of European Ombudsman. In the final ballot in the European Parliament on 18 December 2019, she came in fourth, with only 38 votes.

== Life after politics ==
Since leaving politics, Wikström has been serving as director of the Kjell and Märta Beijers Foundation, a research foundation.

== Other activities ==
=== Corporate boards ===
- Beijer Alma, Member of the Board of Directors (since 2018)

=== Non-profit organizations ===
- Kangaroo Group, Member
- Campaign for the Establishment of a United Nations Parliamentary Assembly, Supporter
- Fight Impunity, Member of the Honorary Board (2019–2022)

== Personal life ==
Wikström has written and published two books. In 2004 she published När livet går sönder, a book about crisis management. Her second book I tillitens tecken was published in 2006. She has also held various positions in national and regional boards, such as the Swedish UNESCO Board, the Police County Board and Liberal Women group in Uppsala County. Since 2001 she is the owner and executive Director of Wikström Consulting LTD.

Wikström is of Tornedalian descent. Tiina Laitila Kälvemark
