= Jeppe Wikström =

Swedish book publisher and photographer (born 1963)

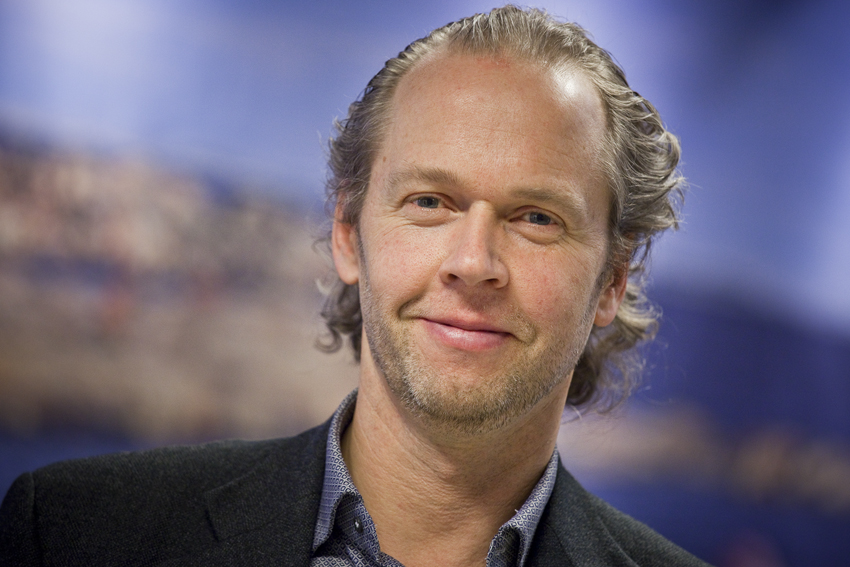
- Jeppe Wikström in April 2011
- Occupation: Photographer

Jeppe Olof Wikström (born 10 April 1963) is a Swedish book publisher and photographer. He is also part owner of the publishing house Bokförlaget Max Ström in Stockholm.

Wikström was project manager in 2009 for Peace! 100 Voices against Violence and War (Swedish: Fred! 100 röster mot våld och krig), which focused on educating young people about alternatives to violence between individuals and nations alike. The initiative coordinated a series of public school events and raised funding to produce a book that was distributed free of charge to all Swedish 16-year-olds.

Wikström is co-founder of Expressions of Humankind Foundation and the director of the global photo project A Day in the World, where people all over the world took pictures of their everyday life on the same day.

== Background ==
Jeppe Wikström was born and raised in Stockholm, the son of Jan-Erik Wikström, a politician who served as Minister for Education in the Swedish government from 1976 to 1982 and was Governor of Uppsala County 1992–1997.

Wikström sold his first photograph at the age of 12 to the weekly magazine Svensk Veckotidning, and by 14 was an apprentice staff photographer at the Stockholm daily newspaper Expressen.

== Professional career ==
Wikström fulfilled his compulsory military service in 1982–83 as a journalist with the armed forces newspaper Värnpliktsnytt. In 1986 he founded the image agency Skärgårdsbild, focussing on nature photography and the Stockholm archipelago. He started a sister company Äventyrsbild in 1989 to specialize in travel and adventure photography. The two agencies were acquired in 1991 by Pressens Bild, where Wikström became marketing director for the combined company. In this capacity, he has led the production of more than 150 photography books published by Max Ström.

Together with Marika Stolpe, Wikström founded the publishing house Bokförlaget Max Ström in 1991, where he now works full-time as publisher.

== Professional awards ==
In 2007, Wikström was awarded the St. Eriks Medallion (in Swedish) by the City of Stockholm for, as the citation read, “his meticulous and buoyant depictions of the capital city in photographs.”

In 2010, Wikström was honored by Sweden's Princess Christina “for his contributions to building bridges between culture and the business community.”

For their work with Peace! 100 Voices against Violence and War, Jeppe Wikström and writer Saam Kapadia shared the Eldh-Ekblad Peace Prize in 2010, the 50th anniversary of the award given annually by the Swedish Peace and Arbitration Society.

In 2012 Wikström was awarded the Bellman Prize by the City of Stockholm for his ”dedicated commitment to the art of photography”.

== Nonprofit work ==
In 1995, Wikström founded Galleri Kontrast, then the largest photographic exhibition gallery in Sweden, under the auspices of the Press Photographers Club, a non-profit professional association.

He has served on the boards of directors of the Lennart Nilsson Award for science photography and the Press Photographers Club.

In 2010, Wikström was instrumental in establishing the international non-profit foundation, Expressions of Humankind, which supports scientific research and education centered on photographic images and the written word. In May 2011, the foundation announced the project A Day in the World.

== Bibliography ==
Jeppe Wikström is the author of several photo books, including:

- Harmony of the Stockholm Skerries, 1995
- Stockholm Horizons, 1996
- Stockholm Time and Again, 1998
- A Day in the Life of Sweden, 2003
- Stockholm from Above, (Swedish: Stockholm från ovan), 2005
- Archipelago Mystery (Swedish: Skärgårdsmysteriet), 2007
- Document STHLM, 2008
- Peace! 100 Voices against Violence and War (Swedish: Fred! 100 röster mot våld och krig), 2009
- A Day in the World, 2012
- ABBA the Official Photo Book, 2014

== Family and personal life ==
Jeppe Wikström has been married since 1997 to author and publisher Marika Stolpe. The couple has two children: Nike (born in 1997) and Vilhelm (born in 2000). The family lives in the town of Vaxholm in the Stockholm archipelago.
