= Publishing Prize =

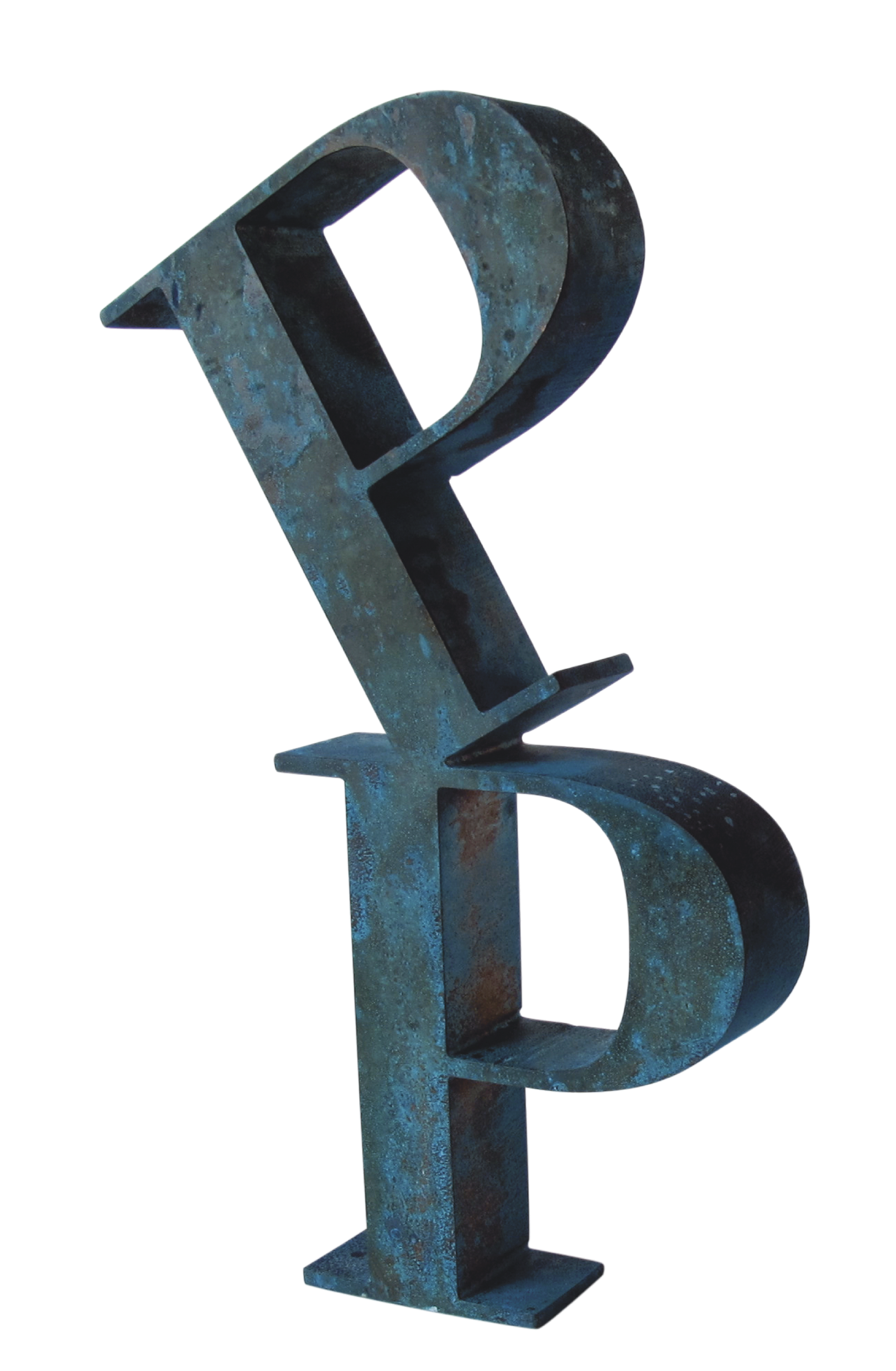
The Publishing Prize statuette

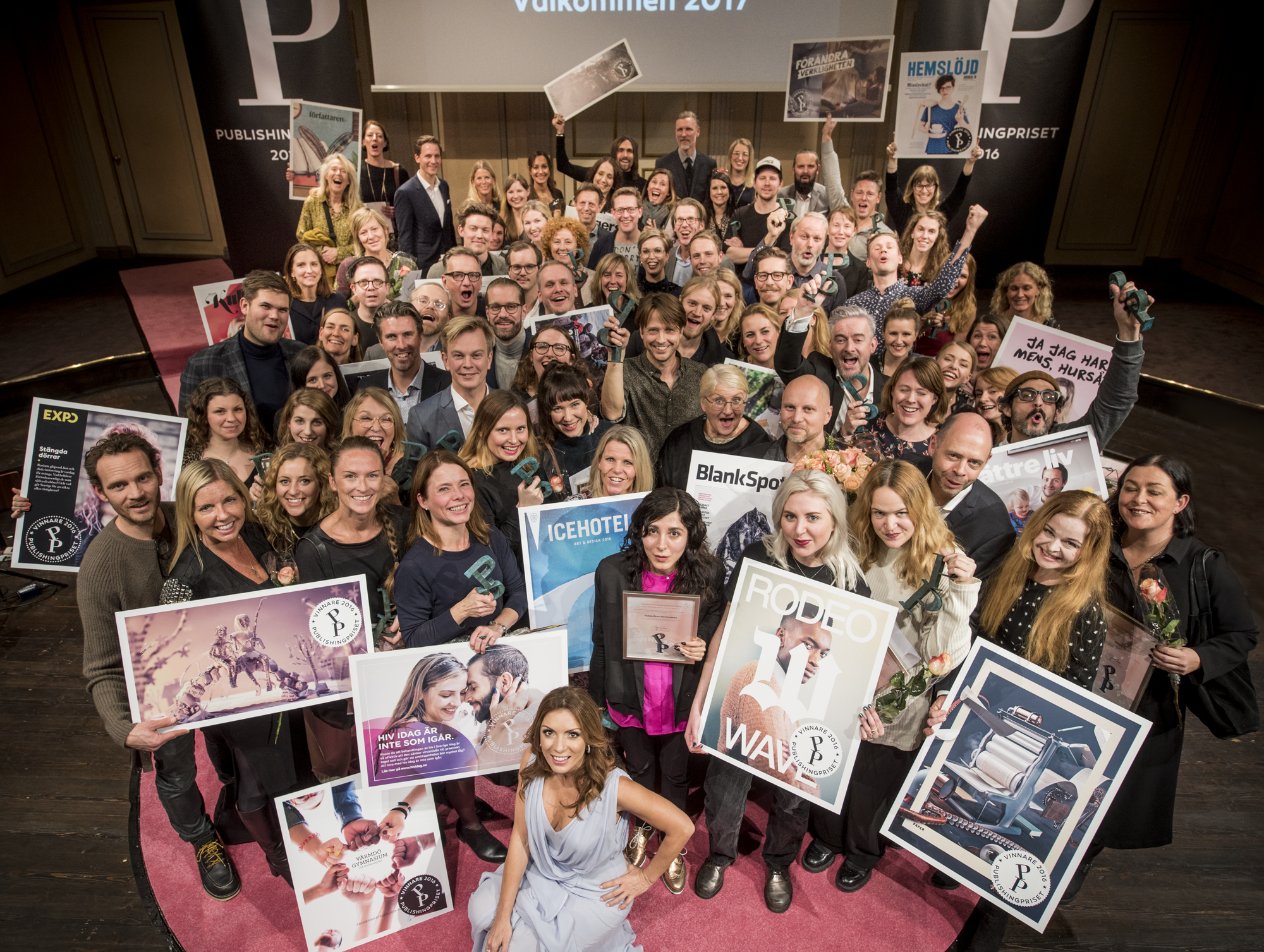
All winners of The Publishing Prize 2016 at the prize ceremony in Stockholm, Sweden. Photo: Fredrik Stehn.

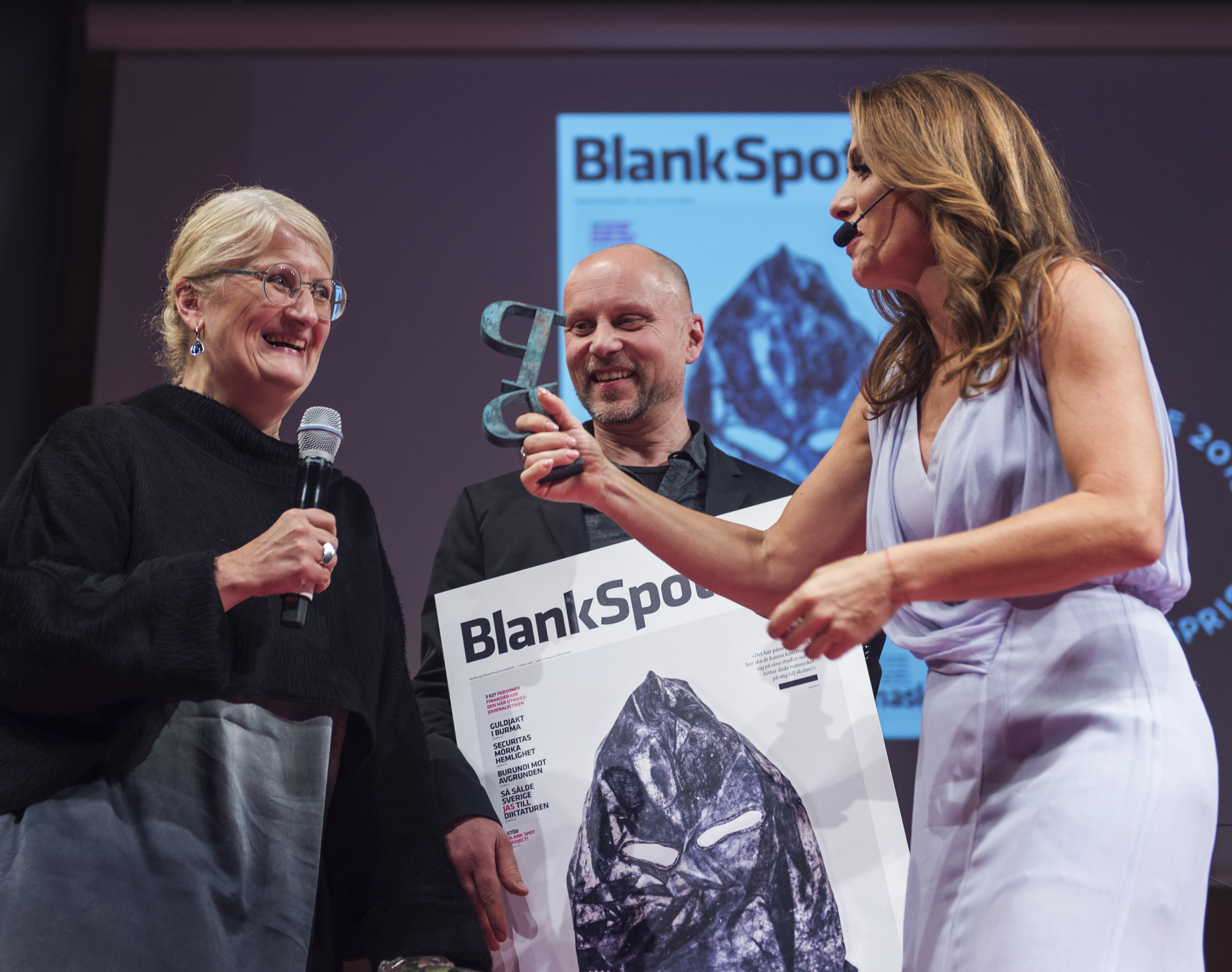
The Publishing Prize Grand Prix 2016: Blankspot Project, Brit Stakston, Nils Resare, Alexandra Pascalidou. Photo: Stina Stjernkvist

The Publishing Prize is an annual award for films, websites, and newspapers, magazines, books and other printed products. The prize has been conferred annually since 1990 in about 30 categories. The prize is considered the most comprehensive communication contest.

== Entry categories ==
The entry categories have evolved over the years to ensure fair competition across a wide and diverse range of communication purposes, audiences, and budgets. For example, print publications can be product catalogues, marketing materials, magazines for company employees, annual reports, educational materials, public authority information publications, tourism and travel guides.

Likewise, the website categories include informational sites, online magazines and newspapers, and sites for members of organizations; the film categories cover the purposes of information-giving, instruction, and marketing.

== Participants ==
The list of winners in 2016 included health information projects; a city's social services division; the Swedish Royal Opera; a membership organization for writers; a secondary school; the Volvo Car Group; a cookery-focused website; Médecins Sans Frontières.

Any company, organization, government agency, municipality, publisher, agency, consultant or individual can register films, websites, magazines, books, annual reports and other printed products with the competition.

== The Jury ==
The jury is made up of active communication experts, such as copywriters, designers, journalists, editors, interaction designers, producers, and directors. The jury not only assesses design, but also gives points to typography, text content, visual content, reprographic quality, usability, cinematography, sound, and direction.

== The yearly contest cycle ==
The jury first nominates three to five candidates in each category. The nominees are made public in August/September each year. The prizes are handed out at a ceremony in Stockholm, Sweden, in October/November. The winners receive a statuette and a certificate. All nominees receive a certificate.

The jury also awards the Publishing Prize Grand Prix to the best of the category winners.

== The prize statuette ==
The statuette for The Publishing Prize was designed by Petter Antonisen, who is a freelance graphic designer and art director.

The statuette is made of steel. Through electrolysis the surface is covered by a layer of copper, whereupon the statuette is patinated by Stockholm sculptor Bo Andersson. One of his specialities is metallic works of art. Through various surface treatments, he creates unique colors on the metal.

== The Publishing Prize Grand Prix through the years ==
1990 Broadcast Media TV4. Ricky Tillblad.

1991 Refuse collection 1991 Vaxjo Municipality. Bosse Lindqwist & Heidi Lindqwist, Lindqwist Production.

1992 Book regulations for the army Lars-Ove Davidson, Defence Media.

1993 Foaiten Magazine Peter Hennix, Swedish National Defence Research Institute.

1994–1996 Recess.

1997 S-tinget Magazine Varmland County Council. Mia Ohlsson & Tin Wegelius.

1998 Letter, word, text – handbook of graphic design Christer Hellmark, Textura.

1999 Graphic Cookbook Kaj Johansson, Peter Lundberg & Robert Ryberg, Kapero Graphic Development.

2000 The age of the lion Jeppe Wikstrom, Publishing house Max Strom in collaboration with Leo form.

2001 Indicator species – indicators of conservation value forests Johan Nitare, Swedish Forest Agency.

2002 Queen Silvia Gunilla Widengren Hammarskiold, Ekerlids Publishers, and Helen Sköld, Kingston.

2003 www.norrbottenlappland.se Mats Astrom & Barbro Gustafsson, Norrbotten-Lappland, Karin Klockare Jarlstrom, Annika Fredriksson & Max Piltz, Vinter Advertising Agency, and Martin Spegel & Magdalena Eriksson, Mirror Partner Development.

2004 Agenda Magazine Ann-Charlotte Hansson, Per Nilsson and Hakan Hermansson, Volvo Car Corporation, in collaboration with Studio Desktop.

2005 Encyclopedia of Swedish flora and fauna – butterflies Christer Engstrom (editor in chief), Lena Eliasson (designer), Martin Holmer and Karl Jilg (illustrators), Claes U. Eliasson, Nils Ryrholm and Ulf Gardenfors (authors), Species Information Centre, Swedish University of Agricultural Sciences.

2006 Hasse & Tage Staffan Schoier and Stefan Wermelin (authors), Claes Gustavsson (designer), Ingemar Perup (picture editor), Sara Nystrom (publisher), Susanna Eriksson Lundqvist (editor), Albert Bonniers.

2007 Timeless Sea Rescuer Swedish Sea Rescue Society in collaboration with Designer Anna Larsson, Anders Wallhed (author), Rolf Westerstrom (CEO), Elisabeth Jansson (marketing) and Magnus Brodd (coordinator), Swedish Sea Rescue Society, Anna Larsson (graphic designer).

2008 Centennium – photography in Sweden, part 1 Swedish Professional Photographers Association, Gosta Flemming (editor), Lars Hall (designer).

2009 SID. Aller Custom Publishing on behalf of the Pressbyran, Mariette Kristenson, Pressbyran, Jonathan Leman (editor), Anna Olsson (editor) and Johan Lindberg (creative director), Aller Custom Publishing

2010 Perspectives on Gothenburg Publishing house Max Strom, Peter Claesson (photographer), Kristian Wedel (author), Patric Leo (design), Petra Ashton Inkapool (original), Marcus Erixson (image processing), Jeppe Wikstrom (publisher) and Charlotta Broady (project leader, editor)

2011 Photographic Journal Swedish Professional Photographers Association in collaboration with Anders Birgersson/Zoo People, Jenny Morelli (editor in chief), Swedish Photographers Professional Association, Anders Birgersson (AD), Zoo People

2011 IKEA Life at home Futurniture on behalf of IKEA Swedish Sales AB, Nils Larsson (marketing), Christian Braendshoi (project leader), Tina Bjoreman (editorial director) and Anna Pettersson (reporter), IKEA Swedish Sales AB, Dan Grettve (account manager), Philip Arvidson (AD) Anna Lenskog (AD), Hanna Meijer (AD), Jenny Gromark (copywriter), Simon Kallgard (interaction designer), Josefina Mothander (production manager), Sverker Carlsson (project manager), Daniel Storm Dahl (membership manager) and Johanna Riedemar (distribution manager), Futurniture

2012 fordetvidare.se Le Bureau on behalf of the National Agency for Education, Eva Nilsson (project manager), Johanna Johncke, (production manager), Lina Elfstrand (AD), Hjalmar Delehag (copy), Le Bureau, Ann Charlotte Gunnarson, National Agency for Education. Production Company: B-Reel

2012 Strindberg worlds Publishing house Max Strom, Jeppe Wikstrom, publisher, Patric Leo, designer, Bjorn Meidal, author, Bengt Wanselius, picture editor

2013 lundhags.se/byxguide NY Advertising Agency on behalf of Lundhags Skomakarna AB, Bj0rn Ceder, creative director; Henrik Melkner, project manager; Stefan Wennerberg, graphic producer, NY Advertising Agency, Henrik Ottosson, CEO; Sara Wanseth, Marketing; Niclas Sjogren, copywriter, Lundhags Skomakarna AB

2014 Sune Jonsson Bodices Publishing house Max Strom. Sune Jonsson (photographer), Val Williams (text), Jeppe Wikstrom (publisher), Patric Leo (design, photo selection), Charlotta Broady (editorial), His Dackenberg (editorial), Patric Leo (editorial), Britta Lundgren (editorial) Petra Ahston Inkapool (original), Amelia Stenbeck-Ramel (original).

2015 Vera (film) South Tower Communication in cooperation with Amphi Production on behalf of the Uppsala County Council. South Tower Communication: Jonas Pertoft (project). Amphi Production: Emma Lundqvist (project), Per Ringqvist (producer), Ylva Gustavsson (director), Karin Aspentrom (screenplay), Carl Rasmussen (photographer). Child protection team at Uppsala University Hospital, Uppsala County Council: Gabriel Otterman (pediatrician, project, facts reviewer), Lena Widing (nurse), Dagmar Lagerberg (expert). https://vimeo.com/107563154

2016 BlankSpot #0 Blank Spot Project: Nils Resare (editor), Martin Schibbye (editor in chief), Brit Stakston (digital strategist). Ronnestam: Johan Ronnestam (concept, idea). Birgersson Production: Anders Birgersson (AD).

2017 (film) Ingen elev ska behöva känna sig otrygg

ProLounge in cooperation with Kärnhuset on behalf of Skolinspektionen.

2017 (print) 100 år och framåt

Designkontoret Silver in cooperation with Jung Relations on behalf of ICA. Designkontoret Silver: Marlis Nylén (project leader), Magda Lipka Falck (ad, designer), Carl Wikner (strategy). Jung Relations: Johan Nyman (editor), Karin Lindebo (project leader). Roland Persson/Skarp Agent (photo). Gustaf Öhrnell Hjalmars/Agent Molly (illustration). Julia Hansson (illustration).

2017 (webb) Volvo Car Group – online annual report 2016

Solberg Kommunikation on behalf of Volvo Car Group. Solberg Kommunikation: Jeanette Gustavsson (customer contact), Anna Larsson (AD), Pilar Perez (AD Online). Volvo Car Group: Nils Mösko (VP Head of Investor Relations), Annelie Nyberg (IR Manager).

2018 (film) Riskgruppen

Nosy AB on behalf of Pensionsmyndigheten. Nosy AB: Hanna Winéus (project leader), Carmen Recarey (operative project leader), Filip Lindquist (CD), Jonas Granström (AD), Andreas Hörnsten (copy), Tobias Wallin (motion), Lotta Engström (original). Pensionsmyndigheten: Anna Savelius (project leader). Photographer: Stephanie Andersson. Production: FLX.

2018 (print) Being There

Bokförlaget Max Ström. Paul Hansen (author, photographer), Charlotta Broady (editor), Jeppe Wikström (publisher), Patric Leo (designer).

2018 (webb) Profoto

Valtech and Bazooka in cooperation with Profoto. Valtech: Mats Saxer (customer contact), Karin Tykesson (project leader), Olle Westerlund and Jennifer Forsberg (User Experience Designer), Anna Kagebeck (team coach), Jill Karlsson (interface developer), Fredrik Höjdegård, Fredrik Danielsson, Jonas Ryttberg, Tobias Hasslebrant and Anders Ekström (developers). Bazooka: Jussi Kilpinen and Oscar Nilsson (Art Director). Profoto: Lars Wiklund (Program Manager), Hanna Fellman (Business Development Manager), Karin Nordqvist (Product Owner), Vendela Hägge (Vice President Global Marketing), Anna Riberth (Product Marketing Manager), Petter Sylvan (CFO).
