= Inger Wikström =

Swedish pianist, composer and conductor (born 1939)

- Born: 11 December 1939
- Instrument: piano

Inger Wikstrom (born 11 December 1939) is a Swedish pianist, composer and conductor.

== Biography ==
Inger Wikstrom began studying piano in Stockholm at the age of six, and at sixteen played as soloist with the Stockholm Philharmonic Orchestra. She made successful debuts as a concert pianist in Stockholm, Berlin, London and New York City. Later concert tours included the United States, Latin America, Russia, Israel, Africa, China, Japan and Australia.

Wikstrom married David Bartov and the couple moved with their three children to Österskär, where they opened the Nordic Music Conservatory in 1977, which became the Nordic Chamber Opera in 1980. Inger Wikström is a member of The Society of Swedish Composers and the Royal Swedish Academy of Music.

Wikstrom is the sister of Gunnel Biberfeld and mother of opera director Mira Bartov. She was married to politician Jan-Erik Wikström 1980-1990.

== Awards ==
- Order of Cavalliero de Rio Branco
- Adelaide Ristori Prize
- Bartok medal
- Villa Lobos medal
- Natur och Kultur Culture Award (1992)

== Works ==
Inger Wikström has composed chamber music, song cycles, and a number of operas. Her recordings have been issued on more than forty albums.

Selected works include:

- La Mère Coupable, opera
- The Nightingale, opera
- The Confession of a Fool chamber opera, text by August Strindberg
- Peter Pan, fairy tale opera
- A Madman's Defence, opera
