= Blankspot =

Swedish online media outlet

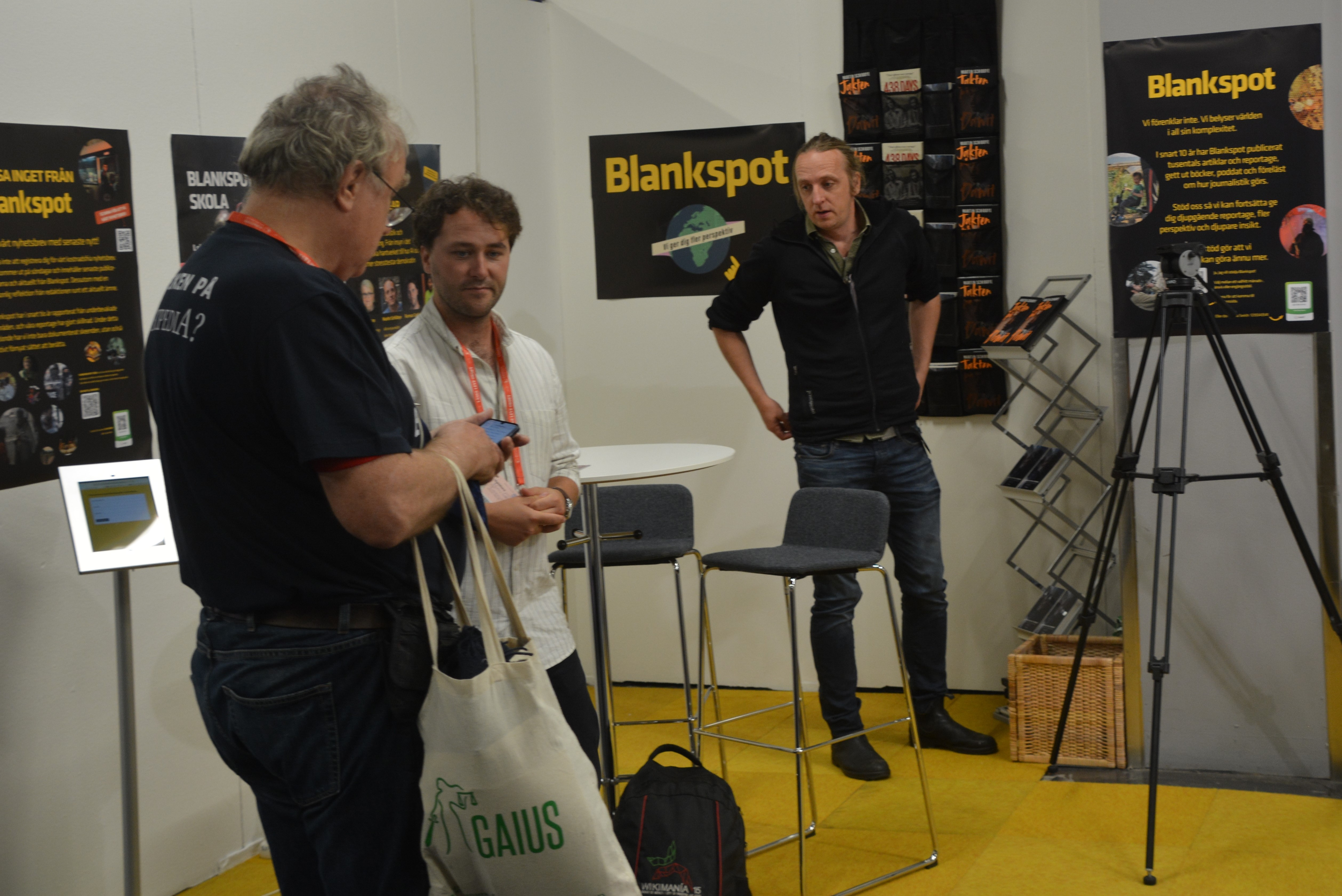
Blankspot’s stand at Göteborg Book Fair 2024

Blankspot (sometimes spelled Blank Spot) is a crowdfunded, Swedish media outlet that publishes long-form journalism. According to Blankspot, its "goal is to tell the stories that do not get told". Inspired by the success of El Español, it was established in 2015 with support from a crowdfunding campaign that generated more than €122,000 in startup costs.
