= Finnish Immigration Service =

Government agency in Finland responsible for immigration policy

- Maahanmuuttovirasto; Migrationsverket

Agency overview
- Formed: 1995
- Preceding agency: Immigration Center of the Ministry of the Interior
- Jurisdiction: Government of Finland
- Headquarters: Pasila administrative center, Helsinki, Finland
- Employees: Over 1,000
- Agency executive: Ilkka Haahtela, Director General
- Parent department: Ministry of the Interior
- Website: migri.fi

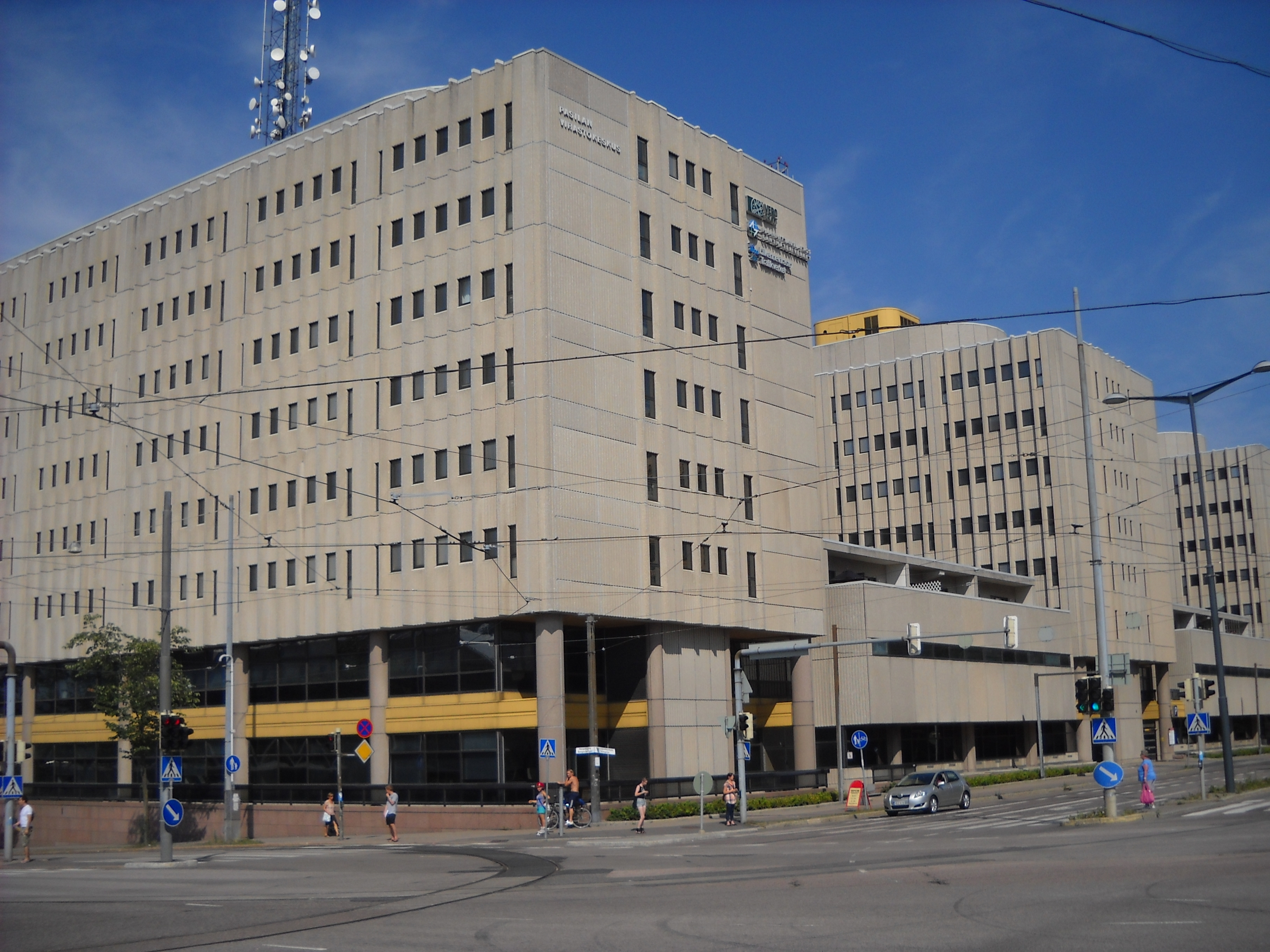
Pasila office centre, Helsinki

Finnish Immigration Service (abbreviated Migri, Swedish: Migrationsverket, Finnish: Maahanmuuttovirasto) is an agency under the Ministry of the Interior that implements Finland's immigration policy and provides information services to support political decision-making as well as national and international cooperation. The agency started operations in 1995 under the name Ulkomaalaisvirasto, a name which was used until 2008.

The Immigration Office of the Ministry of the Interior was established in 1948 and abolished in 1989, when the Immigration Center of the Ministry of the Interior was founded, known since 1995 as the Directorate of Immigration. Since 2008, immigration matters have been handled by the Finnish Immigration Service.

The Finnish Immigration Service is a decision-making organization on immigration, asylum, refugee, and citizenship matters. Its operations include implementing immigration policy, ensuring good governance, and promoting human and fundamental rights as well as controlled immigration. Since 2017, Migri's responsibilities have expanded to include managing extensions of existing residence permits and residency matters for EU citizens.

== Organization ==
The Finnish Immigration Service consists of result units, including the immigration, asylum, reception, and citizenship units. Support units, including the customer and communication unit, and the headquarters, which comprises the legal and country information unit, human resources management, electronic services unit, office, and development services. The agency employs over 1,000 people. The Finnish Immigration Service is supervised and developed by the Director General, a position held by Ilkka Haahtela since September 2022.

The main office of the Finnish Immigration Service is in the Pasila administrative center in Helsinki. The Finnish Immigration Service's reception centers are located in Helsinki, Joutseno, and Oulu.

Until March 2020, the agency operated an Immigration Library on Lintulahdenkatu.

== Criticism ==
In May 2016, the Finnish Immigration Service announced that Iraq, Afghanistan, and Somalia were considered safer countries to return to. On February 10, 2017, asylum seekers began a demonstration against the erroneous asylum decisions made by the Finnish Immigration Service. Demonstrators demanded a review of erroneous asylum decisions, cessation of forced returns, humanitarian protection, and assurance that asylum seekers are not removed from reception centers before the next accommodation is known. Errors in asylum decisions have been attributed to the rush and inexperience of officials, as well as political reasons, although the agency denies political influence in decision-making. Translation errors are also common.
