= Eva Moberg =

Eva Moberg may refer to:

- Eva Moberg (orienteer), Swedish orienteering competitor
- Eva Moberg (writer) (1932–2011), Swedish feminist and writer
- Eva X Moberg, (1962–1999), Swedish journalist and activist
