= Brit Stakston =

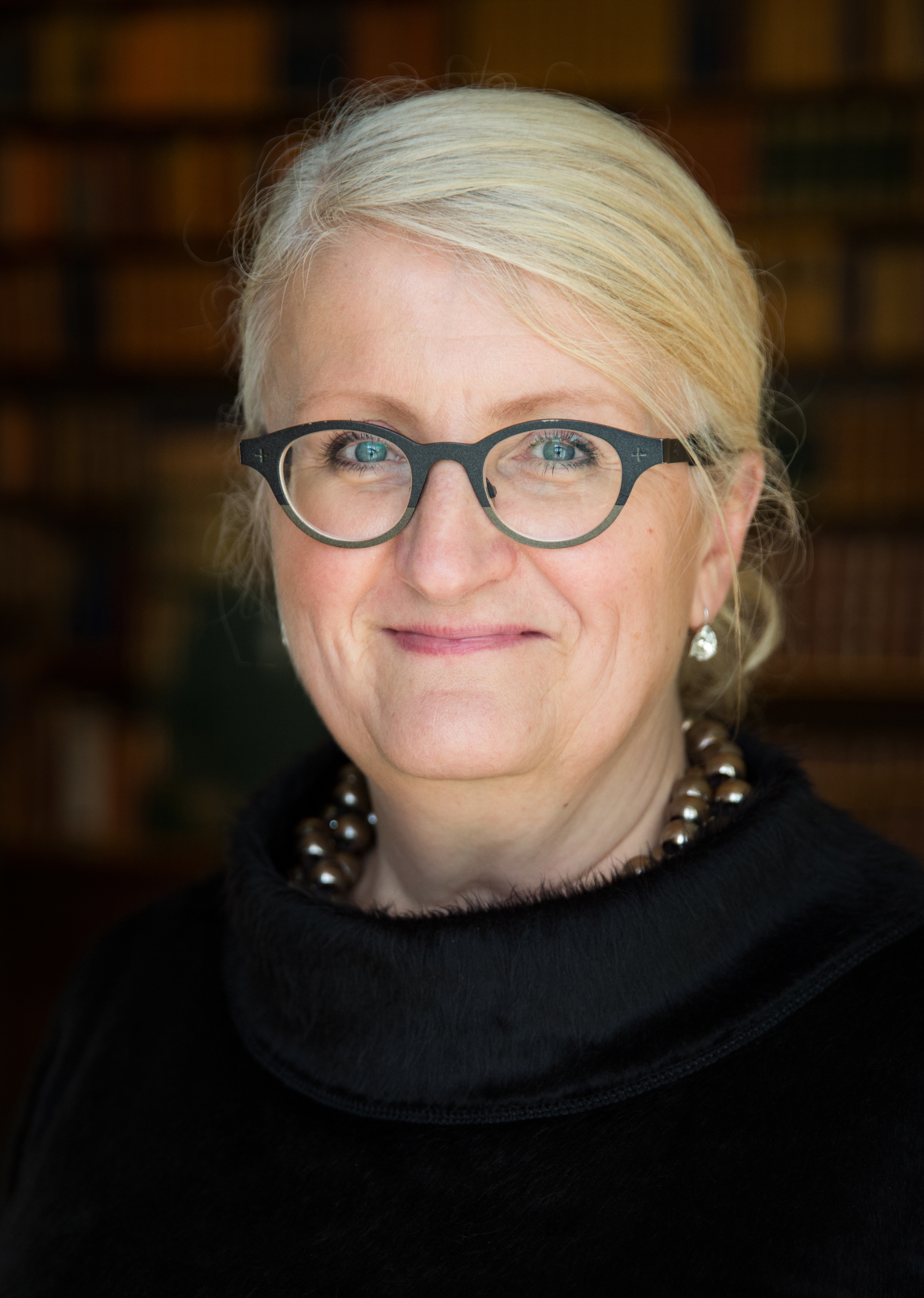
- Brit Stakston in 2015
- Born: 21 December 1961 (age 64); Graz, Austria
- Occupation: Executive Director of Blank Spot Project
- Website: www.stakston.se

Brit Stakston (born 21 December 1961) is a Swedish-Norwegian writer, public speaker and media strategist, who is the executive director of Blank Spot Project, a magazine on foreign issues she founded with Martin Schibbye.

== Biography ==
Brit Stakston was born in Graz, Austria. In 2014, she founded Stakston PR, a public relations agency. The year after, in 2015, she founded the Blank Spot Project, a magazine focusing on foreign issues, together with Martin Schibbye.

In 2009 and 2010, she was named as one of the most prominent names in media of the week during the Almedalen Week. In 2010 and 2011, she was named one of the 50 most prominent women working with IT in Sweden. In 2015, she was nominated for the Stora Journalistpriset together with Martin Schibbye and Nils Resare, for their work with the Blank Spot Project. She received this prize in 2022, together with Schibbye and Patrik Arnesson.
