= Transphotographiques =

Photography festival based in France

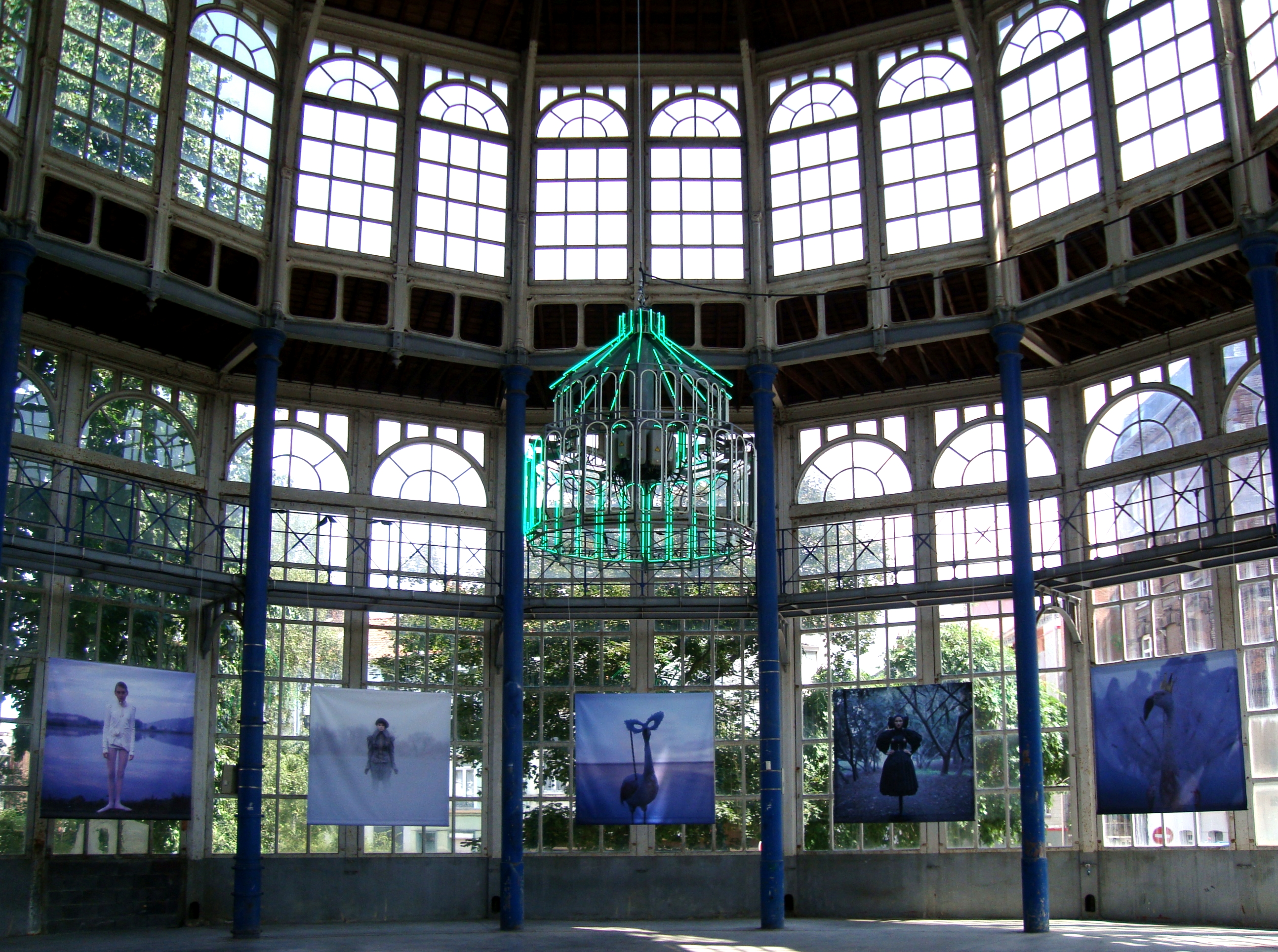
Transphotographiques exhibition at Palais Rameau, Lille, June 2009

Transphotographiques is a photography festival based in Lille, France. It was created in 2001 by Olivier Spillebout, and organized since 2003 by the House of Photography (Maison de la photographie).

== Activities ==
Every year, or biannually, Transphotographiques runs exhibitions, workshops, conferences, and educational programs in the Lille area. For each festival, the work of a special guest (invité d'honneur) – or marraine (godmother) or parrain (godfather) – "defines that year's theme". It is chaired by Bertrand de Talhouët, managed by Olivier Spillebout and organized in partnership with the magazine Photo, and runs from mid May to mid June.

=== Festivals ===
- 2001: curated by Olivier Spillebout and with Willy Ronis as special guest.
- 2002: curated by Olivier Spillebout and with Sabine Weiss as special guest.
- 2003: curated by Olivier Spillebout and with Peter Lindbergh as special guest.
- 2004: Transformation, curated by Jean-Luc Monterosso Sponsored by Maison européenne de la photographie. Included a fringe festival. With William Klein as special guest.
- 2005: Hors circuits (on territory and landscape), curated by Anne de Mondenard and with Raymond Depardon as special guest.
- 2006: [festival canceled]
- 2007: [On film] curated by Olivier Spillebout and with Lucien Clergue as special guest.
- 2008: Mode et photographie, curated by Olivier Spillebout and with Karl Lagerfeld as special guest.
- 2009: [L'Europe et ses frontières], (Note: There seems not to have been an explicit title for the festival. "Les liens et les réseaux tissés au fil des éditions, nous ont amenés naturellement à présenter en 2009, une thématique tournée vers l’Europe et ses frontières: regards croisés de photographes russes, polonais, tchèques, roumains, hongrois, français... qui confrontent leurs visions de la frontière tant territoriale que sociétale et culturelle." "Communiqué de presse", "Dossier de presse" for the 2009 festival (PDF, 3.2 MB). Emphasis added.) curated by Olivier Spillebout and with Stanley Greene as special guest.
- 2010: Une seconde nature (i.e. "a second nature"), curated by Françoise Paviot and Gabriel Bauret and with Joan Fontcuberta as special guest.
- 2011: Nord(s) (i.e. "north(s)") and with Gabriele Basilico as special guest.
- 2012, 2013 [no festival]
- 2014: Collectif (i.e. "collective"); with a major project on "France(s) Territoire liquide", i.e. "France(s) liquid territory").

=== Exhibition locations ===
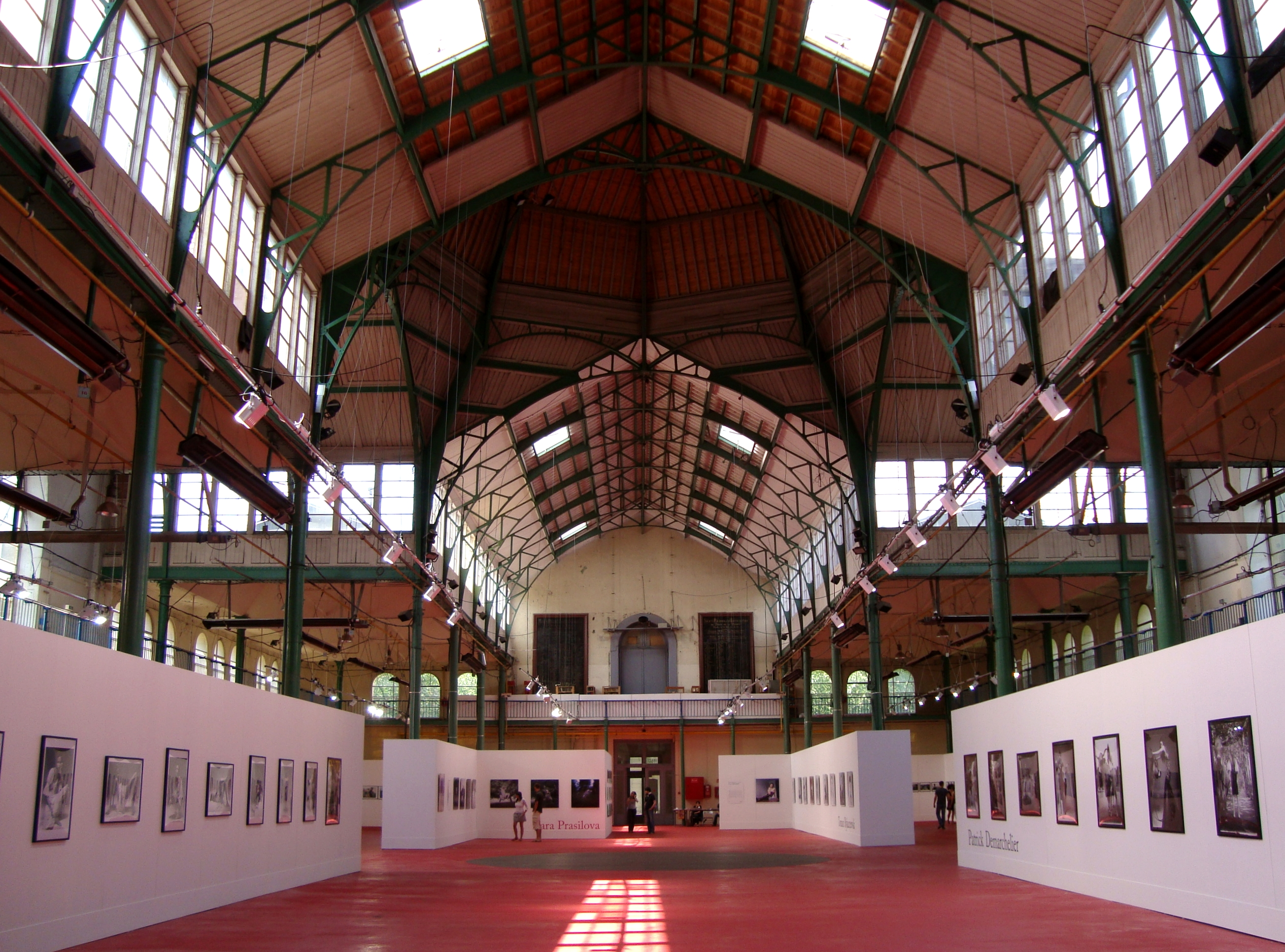
An exhibition of the 2009 festival, in Palais Rameau

The festival is based in Lille, where these locations have been used:

Tri Postal - Palais Rameau - Maisons Folies - Maison de la photographie - Vieille Bourse - Palais Rihour - Hôtel de ville - Lille Cathedral - Église Saint-Maurice de Lille - Musée de l'Hospice Comtesse

It has expanded outside Lille. The 2007 festival, for example, also had events in Roubaix, Lambersart, Valenciennes, and across the border in Kortrijk.

== Partnerships ==
One part of the work of Transphotographiques is to promote the work of local photographers. It is part of Photo Festival Union, a European network of photography festivals.

A month-long exhibition in Stary Browar, Poznań in 2008, Kolekcja Transphotographiques, was a retrospective of the first seven years of Transphotographiques.
