= Sven Ulric Palme =

Swedish historian (1912–1977)

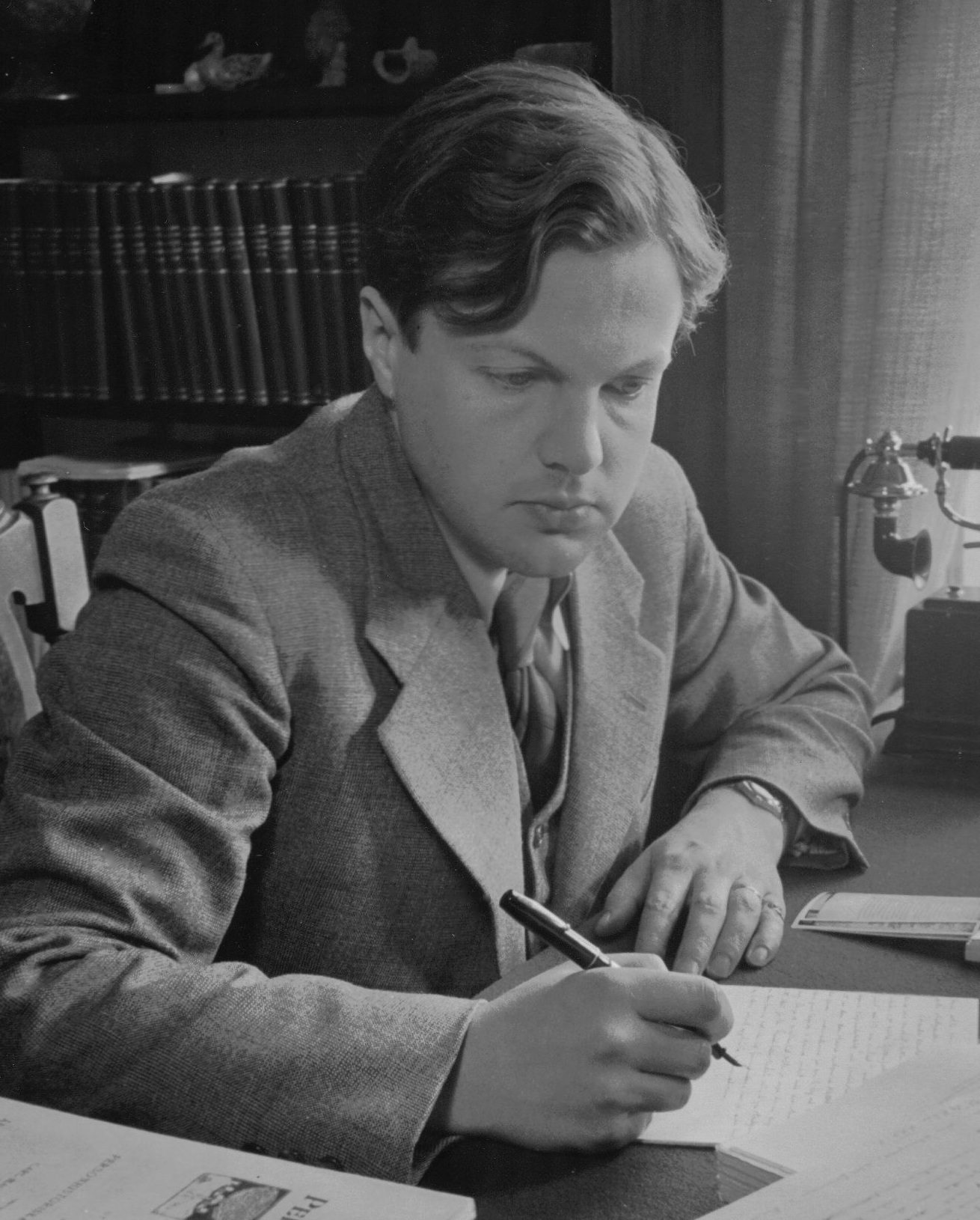
Sven Ulric Palme

Sven Ulric Adalvard Palme (born May 25, 1912, died- May 14, 1977) was a Swedish historian and professor at Stockholm University. He was the son of the historian Olof Palme (1884–1918) and Ola Palme (born Tonow) (1888–1982). His historical research was broad, from Swedish Middle Age to modern political history. The political history was his focus, concentrating on political parties, decision-making processes and key actors in these processes. ¶ In the 1930s he was active in the conservative political debate. But eventually he distanced himself from the conservative ideas and became closer to the Social Democratic tradition. He was contrary to common views of historians at that time, often claiming that many historians did not recognize the truth about historical figures who were often, in his opinion, more villains than heroes.

== Bibliography ==
- Kärleken och hatet - Politiska anteckningar (1935)
- Sverige och Danmark 1596-1611 (doktorsavhandling) (1942)
- Valdemarståget (1946)
- Stånd och klasser i forna dagars Sverige (1947)
- Riksföreståndarvalet 1512 (1949)
- Sten Sture den äldre (1950)
- I den historiska trapetsen (1952)
- Söderköpings riksdag 1595 (1952)
- Vår tids hjältar' (1953)
- Historien och nuet (1954)
- Den gamla goda tiden (1956)
- Gymnasiets samhällslära (1956)
- Kunskap om samhället (1958)
- Vrakplundrare (1958)
- Historia genom kameraögat 1-2 (1958–1959) (tillsammans med Åke Meyerson)
- Kungligt och kvinnligt (1958)
- Kristendomens genombrott i Sverige (1959)
- Karl Staaff och storstrejken 1909 (1959)
- Skottet på operamaskeraden (1962)
- Hundra år under kommunalförfattningarna (red.) (1962)
- Vår längsta statsminister - En bok om Tage Erlander (1963)
- På Karl Staaffs tid (1964)
- Stockholms krigshistoria (1964)
- Skottet i Sarajevo (1964)
- Mannen med järnmasken (1965)
- Målaren och hans modell samt andra kapitel ur sedehistorien (1966)
- Hur Frankrike blev Frankrike (1967)
- Skottet mot Lincoln (1968)
- Mordet på Caesar (1968)
