= Swedish Peace and Arbitration Society =

Swedish non-governmental organization

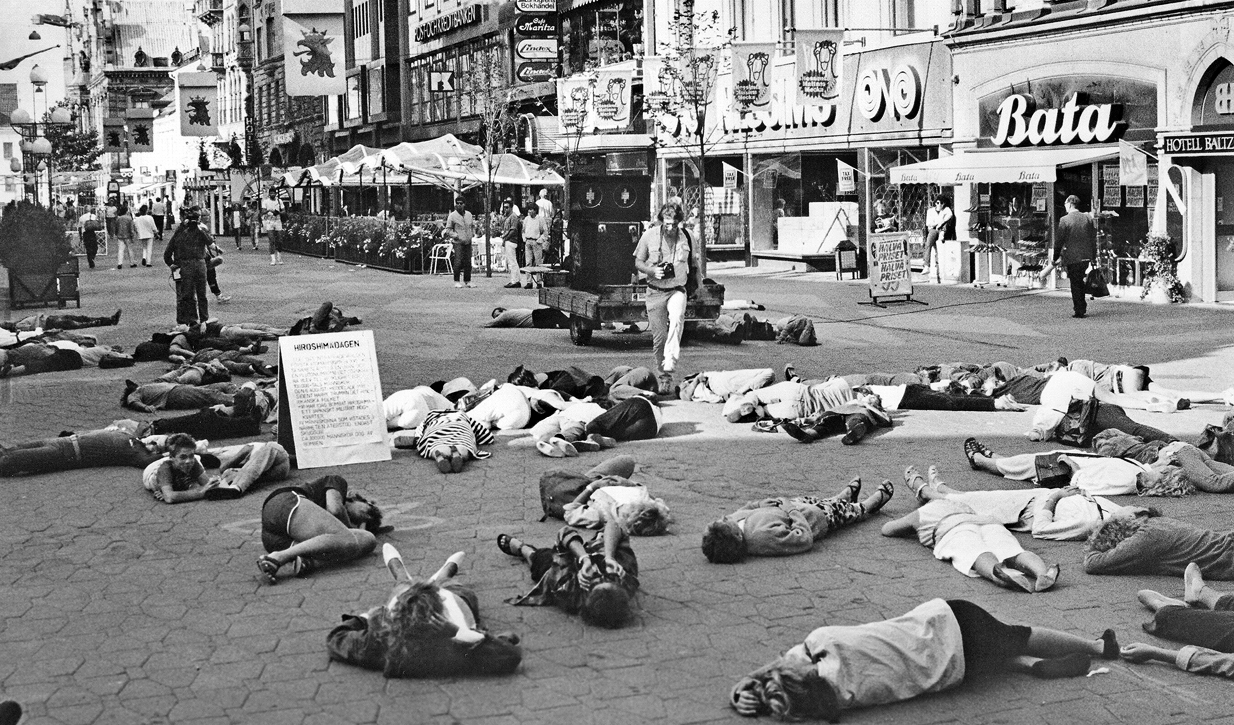
Hiroshima Day. On August 6, 1987, Swedish Peace and Arbitration Society organized a demonstration on "Ströget" in central Malmö. The sound the bomb blast rang out from large loudspeakers, and people fell to the ground, remaining there for five minutes to the sound of Verdi's Requiem.

The Swedish Peace and Arbitration Society (SPAS) (Swedish: Svenska freds- och skiljedomsföreningen) is a non-governmental organization in Sweden, dedicated to peace, disarmament and democratization. It operates by methods including publishing, lobbying, activism and participating in political debates. SPAS has published an array of books and reports. The name of the organization's member's magazine is Pax. SPAS' central office is situated in Stockholm, headed by current president Agnes Hellström. However, there are about 20 local branches throughout Sweden. The society has a total of about 8500 members.

== History ==
The Swedish Peace and Arbitration Society is the world's oldest peace organization, and Scandinavia's largest today. It was founded in 1883 by 50 Swedish parliamentarians and headed by Klas Pontus Arnoldson, who was awarded the 1908 Nobel Peace Prize.

Among SPAS' notable achievements are:

- Assisting the peaceful resolution of the dissolution of the union of Sweden and Norway in 1905;
- Proposing alternative service for conscientious objectors, which became law in 1920;
- Forming an 80,000-people human chain between the U.S. and Soviet embassies in Stockholm in 1983, and
- Exposing illegal and dubious Swedish arms export deals.

In 2015, after a Russian submarine was spotted off the coast of Sweden, in response to Russia’s ban of LGBT propaganda, the organization designed a subsurface sonar system with a depiction of a thrusting soldier and Morse code that translated to “This way if you are gay”.

== Criticism ==
During Russian invasion of Ukraine, SPAS has been heavily criticised for its worldview and its position to not support Ukraine militarily. In Sweden, organisation's members are frequently called "traitors" and "Putin's useful idiots".

== Surveillance by the Swedish Security Police ==
Swedish government has published reports revealing that SPAS was surveilled by the Swedish security police because of suspected links to Russian intelligence services.

== See also ==
- List of anti-war organizations
