= Martin Schibbye =

Swedish journalist and former editor (born 1980)

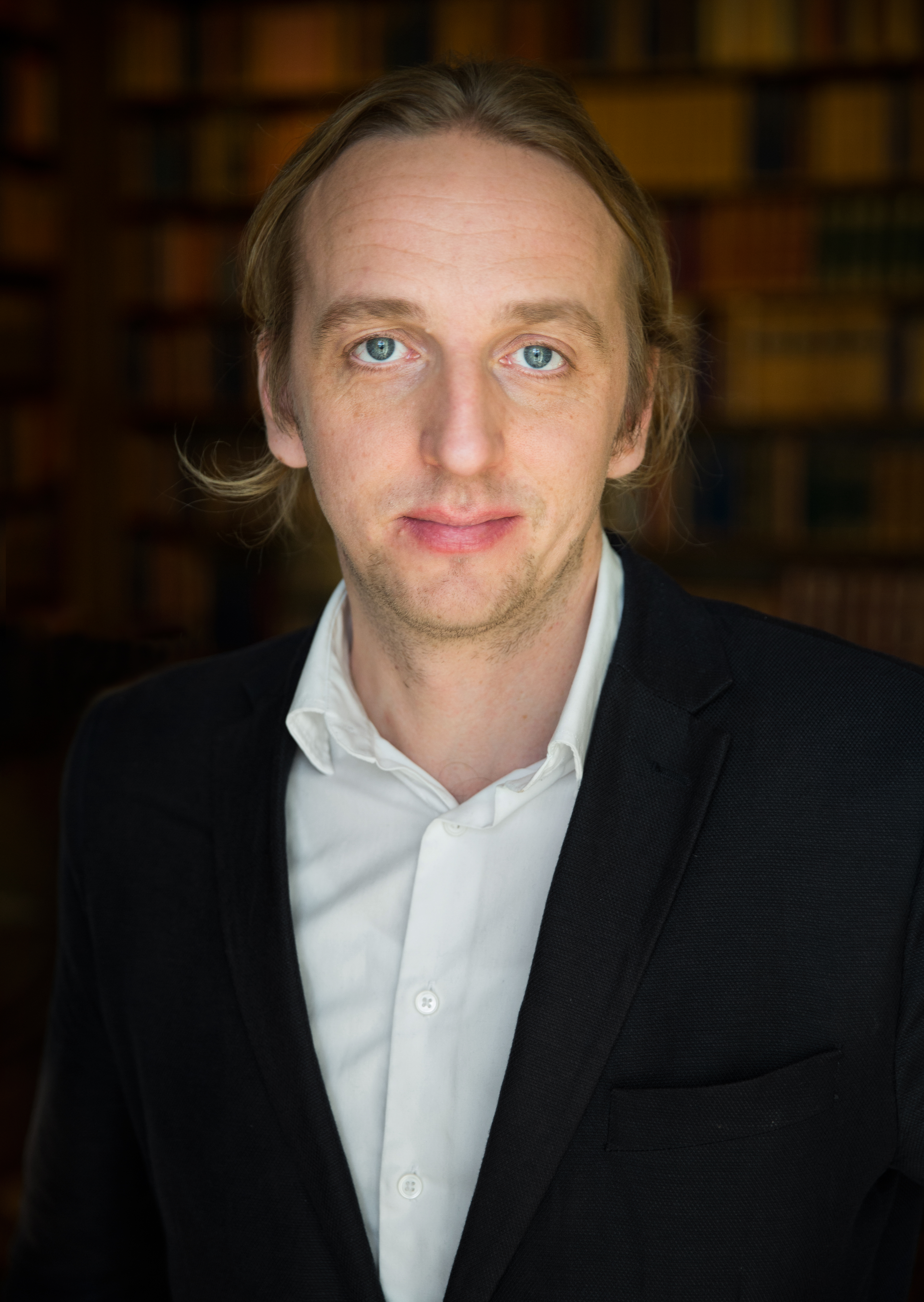
Martin Schibbye, 2015

Martin Karl Schibbye (Swedish pronunciation: [ˈɧɪ̌bːʏ]; born 17 October 1980) is a Swedish journalist and former editor. After an assignment in the conflict-ridden Ogaden region of Ethiopia he was sentenced to eleven years in prison for terrorist crimes on 27 December 2011, but was later pardoned and released on 10 September 2012. He was held at the notorious Kaliti Prison.

== Career ==
Schibbye became editor of Sweden's Revolutionary Communist Youth magazine Rebell in his twenties. After military service in Strängnäs 00-01, he graduated with a B.A. in political science and an M.A. in economic history and a B.A. in journalism. Today he is a freelance journalist.

He has worked as a foreign correspondent for several newspapers, including The Times, Amelia and Proletären. He has worked in several different countries, including Algeria, the Philippines, the United Arab Emirates, Cuba, Venezuela, Syria, Lebanon, Palestine, Thailand and Vietnam. He has been the editor of the quarterly Iraksolidaritet and the monthly magazine Folket i Bild/Kulturfront. Recently he worked for the magazine Filter.

=== Arrested and sentenced for terrorist crimes in Ethiopia ===
On 1 July 2011 Schibbye was arrested along with the Swedish photographer Johan Persson in Ethiopia suspected of terrorist crimes after they illegally entered the Ogaden region from Somalia in the company of ONLF guerrillas. Schibbye and Persson were sentenced to 11 years in jail on 27 December 2011. The evidence submitted during the trial included film produced by the Ethiopian authorities, based both on material recorded by Schibbye and Persson and on interviews made under duress by the authorities.

Reporters Without Borders voiced disapproval of the way the Ethiopian judicial system was handling the case and warned of the danger of serious diplomatic repercussions of the jail sentences: "Every meeting between Ethiopian officials and their European or western counterparts will henceforth be affected by this case."

On 10 September 2012 they were pardoned and released. Schibbye returned to Sweden on 14 September 2012 and subsequently held a press conference together with Johan Persson, telling about their time in Ethiopia. Schibbye published a book in 2013, "438 dagar" (438 Days), detailing his experience.

== Awards ==
Schibbye was awarded the 2011 Robespierre Prize of SEK 10,000 by the Jan Myrdal Society for his journalism, specifically his coverage of Iraq. He received the 2012 Freelance Award, the 2012 Anna Politkovskaya Memorial Award, and Reporters Without Borders’ 2013 Press Freedom Prize. His book with Johan Persson, "438 dagar", was shortlisted for the 2013 August Prize in the non-fiction category.
