= Sula Municipality =

Municipality in Møre og Romsdal, Norway

Sula Municipality Sula kommune
- Municipality
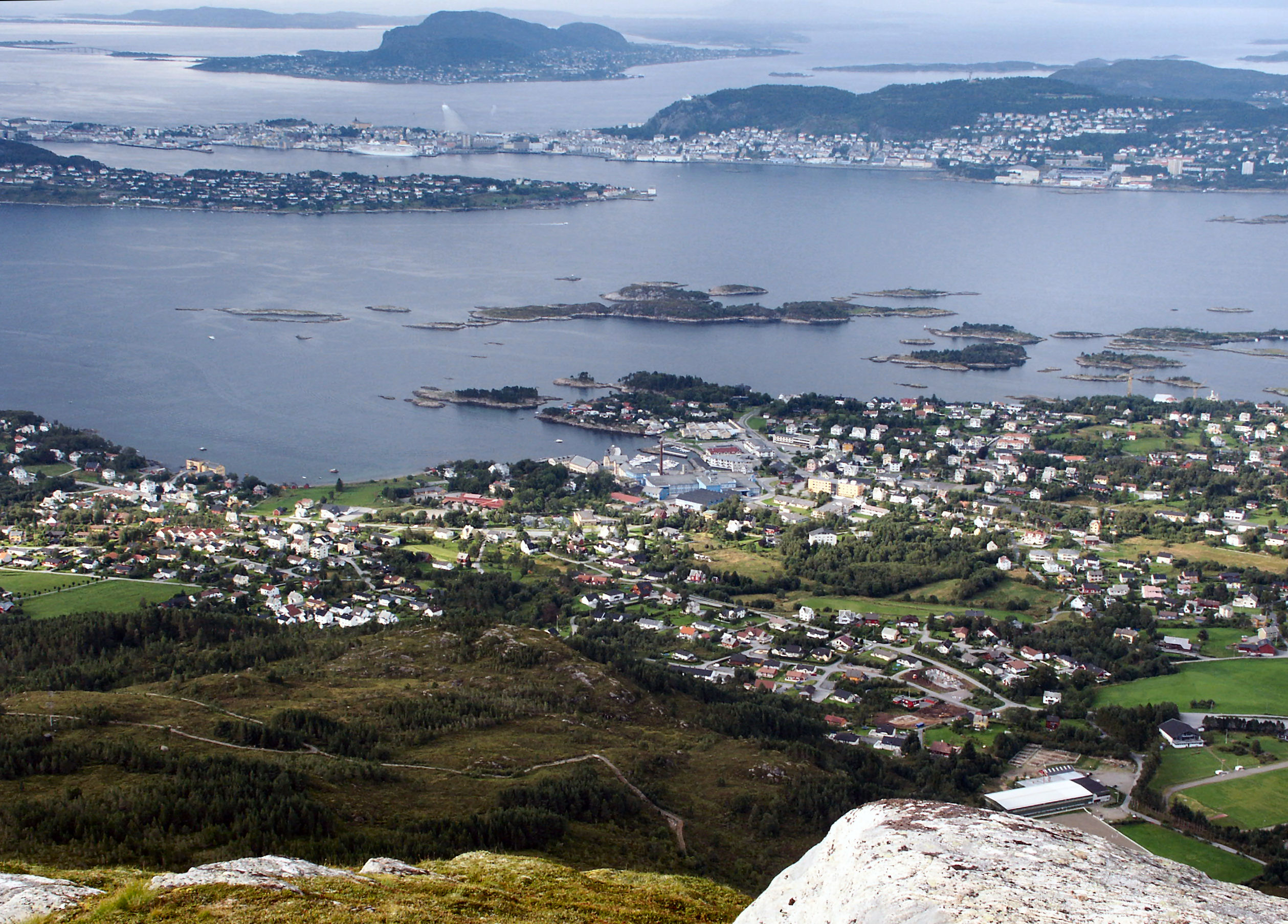
- View of Langevåg (looking towards the town of Ålesund, administrative center of the neighboring Ålesund Municipality)

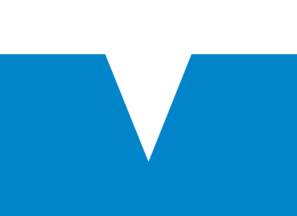
- Flag Coat of arms

- Møre og Romsdal within Norway

- Sula within Møre og Romsdal
- Coordinates: 62°25′29″N 06°12′22″E
- Country: Norway
- County: Møre og Romsdal
- District: Sunnmøre
- Established: 1 Jan 1977
  - Preceded by: Ålesund Municipality
- Administrative centre: Langevåg

Government
  - Mayor (2023): Turid Humlen (H)

Area
  - Total: 58.51 km^{2} (22.59 sq mi)
  - Land: 57.07 km^{2} (22.03 sq mi)
  - Water: 1.44 km^{2} (0.56 sq mi) 2.5%
  - Rank: #347 in Norway
- Highest elevation: 776.85 m (2,548.7 ft)

Population (2024)
  - Total: 9,720
  - Rank: #118 in Norway
  - Density: 166.1/km^{2} (430/sq mi)
  - Change (10 years): ▲ +12.4%
- Demonym: Sulalending

Official language
  - Norwegian form: Nynorsk
- Time zone: UTC+01:00 (CET)
  - Summer (DST): UTC+02:00 (CEST)
- ISO 3166 code: NO-1531
- Website: Official website

Sula (Urban East Norwegian: [ˈsʉ̀ːɽɑ]) is a municipality in Møre og Romsdal county, Norway. It is part of the Sunnmøre district. The administrative centre is the village of Langevåg. Other villages include Solevåg, Fiskarstrand, Veibust, Leirvågen, and Mauseidvåg. Sula is one of the most densely populated municipalities in Møre og Romsdal county, and it is part of the Ålesund Region since it is just south of the city of Ålesund. The municipality encompasses the island of Sula and the many small surrounding islets.

The 59-square-kilometre (23 sq mi) municipality is the 347th largest by area out of the 357 municipalities in Norway. Sula Municipality is the 118th most populous municipality in Norway with a population of 9,720. The municipality's population density is 166.1 inhabitants per square kilometre (430/sq mi) and its population has increased by 12.4% over the previous 10-year period.

== General information ==
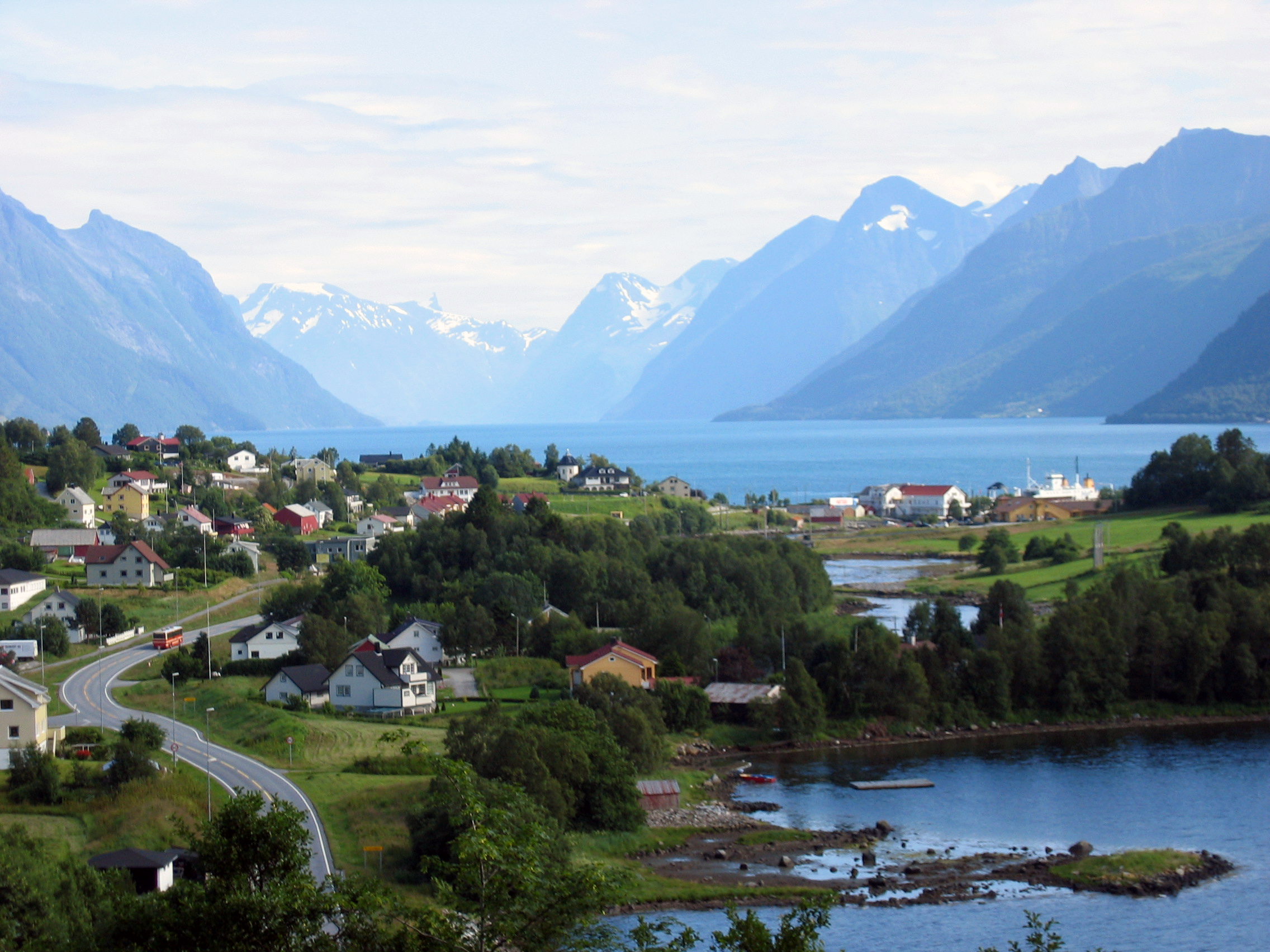
View of the village of Sunde

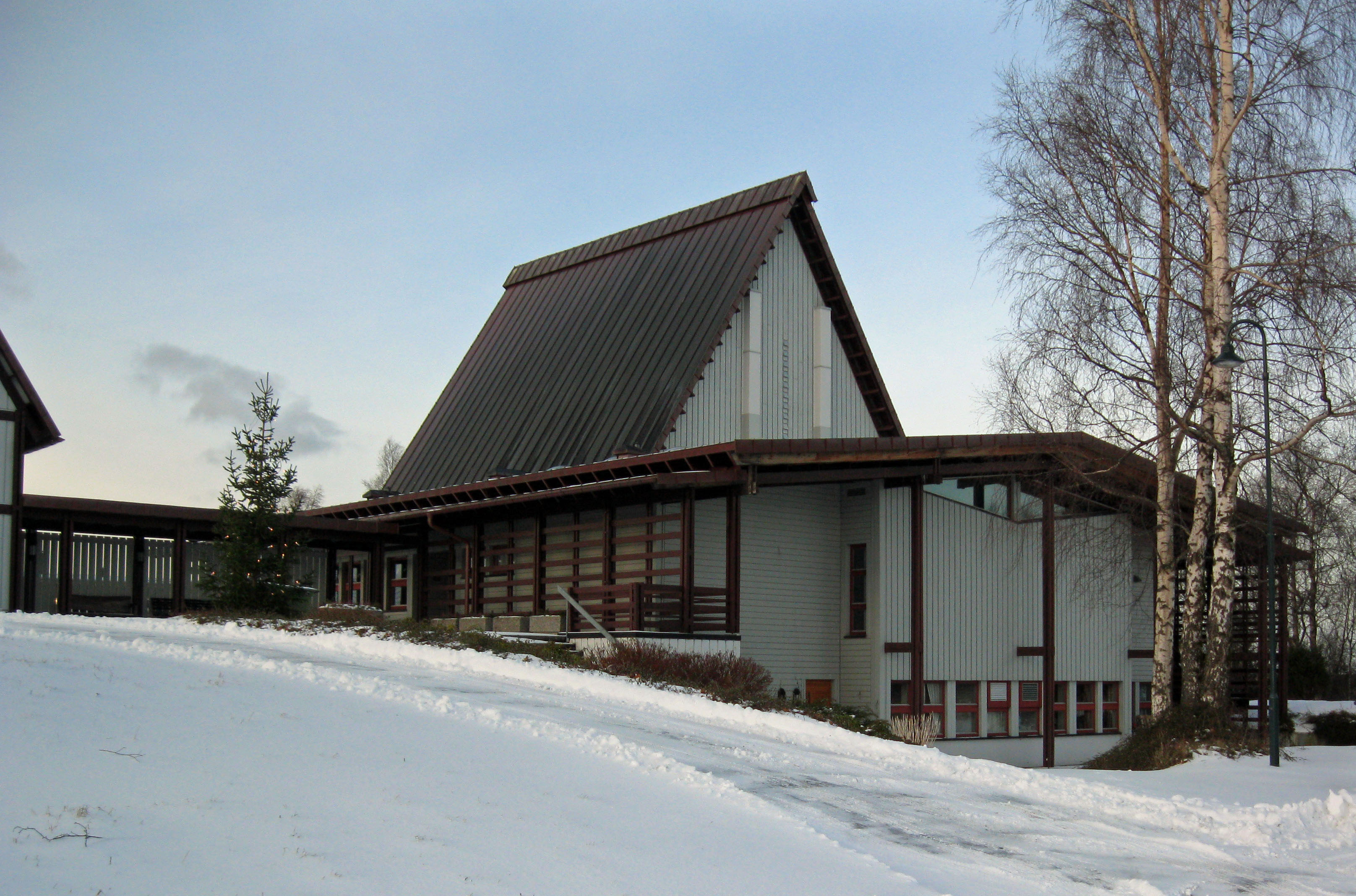
View of Indre Sula Church

When municipalities were first created in Norway in 1838 under the formannskapsdistrikt law, most of the island of Sula was part of Borgund Municipality and a small southwestern portion of the island belonged to Ulstein Municipality (later part of Hareid Municipality). On 1 July 1958, the southwestern part of Sula island was transferred into Borgund Municipality, unifying the whole island as part of the same municipality. On 1 January 1968, Borgund Municipality (including all of the island of Sula) was merged with the town of Ålesund to form a new, much larger Ålesund Municipality.

On 1 January 1977, the entire island of Sula and the many small islets around it were separated from Ålesund Municipality to become the new Sula Municipality. The initial population of the Sula Municipality was 6,302. The borders have not changed since that time.

=== Name ===
The municipality is named after the island of Sula (Old Norse: Súla) since the island made up the majority of the municipality. The name is likely derived from the word súla which means "cleft", probably referring to the cleft between the twin peaks of Rundehornet and Vardane.

=== Coat of arms ===
The coat of arms was granted on 16 December 1983. The official blazon is "Azure, a chief and pile argent" (Norwegian: I blått eit sølv skjoldhovut med nedvend spiss). This means the arms have are divided with a horizontal line that has a triangular part that drops below the main line. The field (background) below the line has a tincture of blue. Above the line, the field has a tincture of argent which means it is commonly colored white, but if it is made out of metal, then silver is used. The design was chosen to symbolize the cleft of the island between the twin peaks of Rundehornet and Vardane. The arms were designed by Jarle Skuseth. The municipal flag has the same design as the coat of arms.

=== Churches ===
The Church of Norway has one parish (sokn) within Sula Municipality. It is part of the Nordre Sunnmøre prosti (deanery) in the Diocese of Møre.

Churches in Sula Municipality
Parish (sokn)	Church name	Location of the church	Year built
Sula	Langevåg Church	Langevåg	1948
Sula	Indre Sula Church	Mauseidvåg	1984

== Geography ==
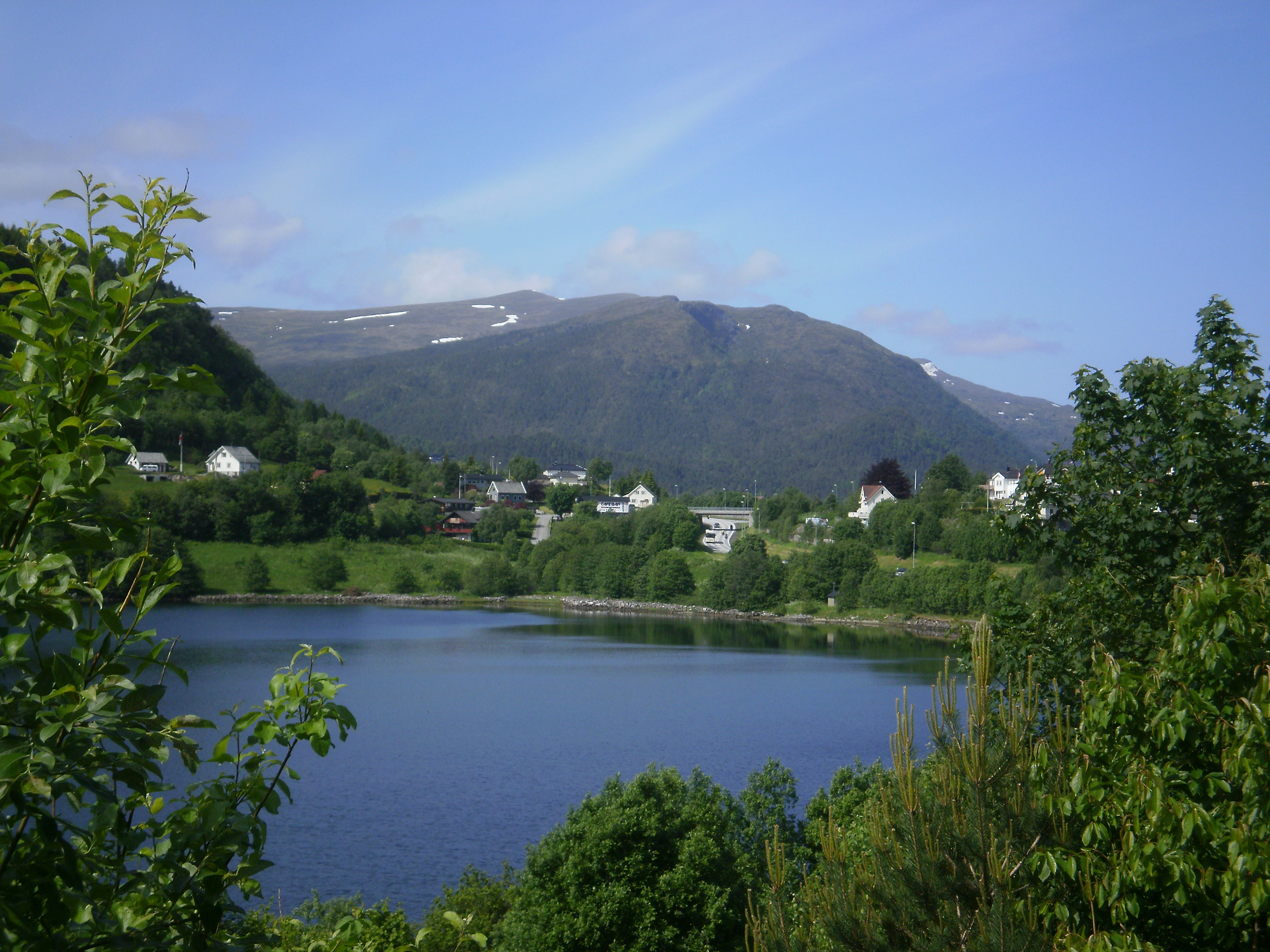
Sulafjellet viewed from Solevågen to the east

Sula Municipality includes the main island of Sula plus many small surrounding islets. It is bordered by the Sulafjorden strait to the west, the Storfjorden to the south, the Hessafjorden and Borgundfjorden to the north, and the narrow Vegsundet strait to the east. The only road access to the island is the European route E39 highway bridge over the Vegsundet, connecting it to Ålesund Municipality.

The natural environment is typically coastal with a sparse forest. The landscape is mostly rocky with heather covering the ground. The highest point in the municipality is the 776.85-metre (2,548.7 ft) tall mountain Tverrfjellet on the island of Sula. Its neighbouring municipalities are all separated from it by sea, with Hareid Municipality to the west, Ørsta Municipality to the south, Giske Municipality to the northwest, and Ålesund Municipality to the north and east.

== Government ==
Sula Municipality is responsible for primary education (through 10th grade), outpatient health services, senior citizen services, welfare and other social services, zoning, economic development, and municipal roads and utilities. The municipality is governed by a municipal council of directly elected representatives. The mayor is indirectly elected by a vote of the municipal council. The municipality is under the jurisdiction of the Sunnmøre District Court and the Frostating Court of Appeal.

=== Municipal council ===
The municipal council (Kommunestyre) of Sula Municipality is made up of 29 representatives that are elected to four year terms. The tables below show the current and historical composition of the council by political party.

Sula kommunestyre 2023–2027
Party name (in Nynorsk)	Number of representatives
Labour Party (Arbeidarpartiet)	6
Progress Party (Framstegspartiet)	9
Conservative Party (Høgre)	6
Christian Democratic Party (Kristeleg Folkeparti)	3
Socialist Left Party (Sosialistisk Venstreparti)	1
Liberal Party (Venstre)	1
Sula List (Sulalista)	3
Total number of members:	29

Sula kommunestyre 2019–2023
Party name (in Nynorsk)	Number of representatives
Labour Party (Arbeidarpartiet)	6
Progress Party (Framstegspartiet)	9
Conservative Party (Høgre)	4
Christian Democratic Party (Kristeleg Folkeparti)	3
Socialist Left Party (Sosialistisk Venstreparti)	2
Liberal Party (Venstre)	1
Sula List (Sulalista)	4
Total number of members:	29

Sula kommunestyre 2015–2019
Party name (in Nynorsk)	Number of representatives
Labour Party (Arbeidarpartiet)	6
Progress Party (Framstegspartiet)	8
Green Party (Miljøpartiet Dei Grøne)	1
Conservative Party (Høgre)	5
Christian Democratic Party (Kristeleg Folkeparti)	4
Liberal Party (Venstre)	1
Sula List (Sulalista)	4
Total number of members:	29

Sula kommunestyre 2011–2015
Party name (in Nynorsk)	Number of representatives
Labour Party (Arbeidarpartiet)	5
Progress Party (Framstegspartiet)	9
Conservative Party (Høgre)	5
Christian Democratic Party (Kristeleg Folkeparti)	4
Liberal Party (Venstre)	2
Sula List (Sulalista)	4
Total number of members:	29

Sula kommunestyre 2007–2011
Party name (in Nynorsk)	Number of representatives
Labour Party (Arbeidarpartiet)	5
Progress Party (Framstegspartiet)	10
Conservative Party (Høgre)	2
Christian Democratic Party (Kristeleg Folkeparti)	4
Centre Party (Senterpartiet)	1
Liberal Party (Venstre)	1
Sula List, party independent list for Sula (Sulalista, partipolitisk uavhengig liste for Sula)	6
Total number of members:	29

Sula kommunestyre 2003–2007
Party name (in Nynorsk)	Number of representatives
Labour Party (Arbeidarpartiet)	4
Progress Party (Framstegspartiet)	11
Conservative Party (Høgre)	4
Christian Democratic Party (Kristeleg Folkeparti)	4
Centre Party (Senterpartiet)	1
Liberal Party (Venstre)	1
Sula List, party independent list for Sula (Sulalista, partipolitisk uavhengig liste for Sula)	4
Total number of members:	29

Sula kommunestyre 1999–2003
Party name (in Nynorsk)	Number of representatives
Labour Party (Arbeidarpartiet)	4
Progress Party (Framstegspartiet)	5
Conservative Party (Høgre)	4
Christian Democratic Party (Kristeleg Folkeparti)	6
Liberal Party (Venstre)	2
Sula List (Sulaliste)	8
Total number of members:	29

Sula kommunestyre 1995–1999
Party name (in Nynorsk)	Number of representatives
Labour Party (Arbeidarpartiet)	5
Progress Party (Framstegspartiet)	4
Conservative Party (Høgre)	3
Christian Democratic Party (Kristeleg Folkeparti)	6
Centre Party (Senterpartiet)	1
Liberal Party (Venstre)	2
Independent list for Sula (Uavhengig liste for Sula)	8
Total number of members:	29

Sula kommunestyre 1991–1995
Party name (in Nynorsk)	Number of representatives
Labour Party (Arbeidarpartiet)	4
Progress Party (Framstegspartiet)	2
Conservative Party (Høgre)	5
Christian Democratic Party (Kristeleg Folkeparti)	6
Liberal Party (Venstre)	2
Independents list for Sula (Uavhengig liste for Sula)	10
Total number of members:	29

Sula kommunestyre 1987–1991
Party name (in Nynorsk)	Number of representatives
Labour Party (Arbeidarpartiet)	4
Progress Party (Framstegspartiet)	4
Conservative Party (Høgre)	5
Christian Democratic Party (Kristeleg Folkeparti)	6
Liberal Party (Venstre)	3
Independent list for Inner Sula (Uavhengig liste for Indre Sula)	4
Independent list for Outer Sula (Uavhengig liste for Ytre Sula)	3
Total number of members:	29

Sula kommunestyre 1983–1987
Party name (in Nynorsk)	Number of representatives
Labour Party (Arbeidarpartiet)	5
Conservative Party (Høgre)	6
Christian Democratic Party (Kristeleg Folkeparti)	6
Liberal Party (Venstre)	2
Non-party list for Inner Sula (Upolitisk liste for Indre Sula)	5
Non-party list for Outer Sula (Upolitisk liste for Ytre Sula)	5
Total number of members:	29

Sula kommunestyre 1979–1983
Party name (in Nynorsk)	Number of representatives
Labour Party (Arbeidarpartiet)	4
Conservative Party (Høgre)	6
Christian Democratic Party (Kristeleg Folkeparti)	6
Liberal Party (Venstre)	2
Non-party election list for Inner Sula (Upolitisk valliste for Indre Sula)	5
Non-party election list for Outer Sula (Upolitisk valliste for Ytre Sula)	6
Total number of members:	29

=== Mayors ===
The mayor (Nynorsk: ordførar) of Sula Municipality is the political leader of the municipality and the chairperson of the municipal council. Here is a list of people who have held this position:

- 1977–1978: Bjarne Bjørkavåg
- 1978–1979: Per Gundersen
- 1980–1985: Hallvard Ramnefjell
- 1986–1995: Ivar H. Molvær (KrF)
- 1995–1999: Gunvor Reistad Aannø (H)
- 1999–2003: Egil Weltzien Holst (KrF)
- 2003–2011: Ronny Harald Blomvik (FrP)
- 2011–2015: Geir Ove Vegsund (H)
- 2015–2023: Jim Arve Røssevoll (Ap)
- 2023–present: Turid Humlen (H)

== Culture ==
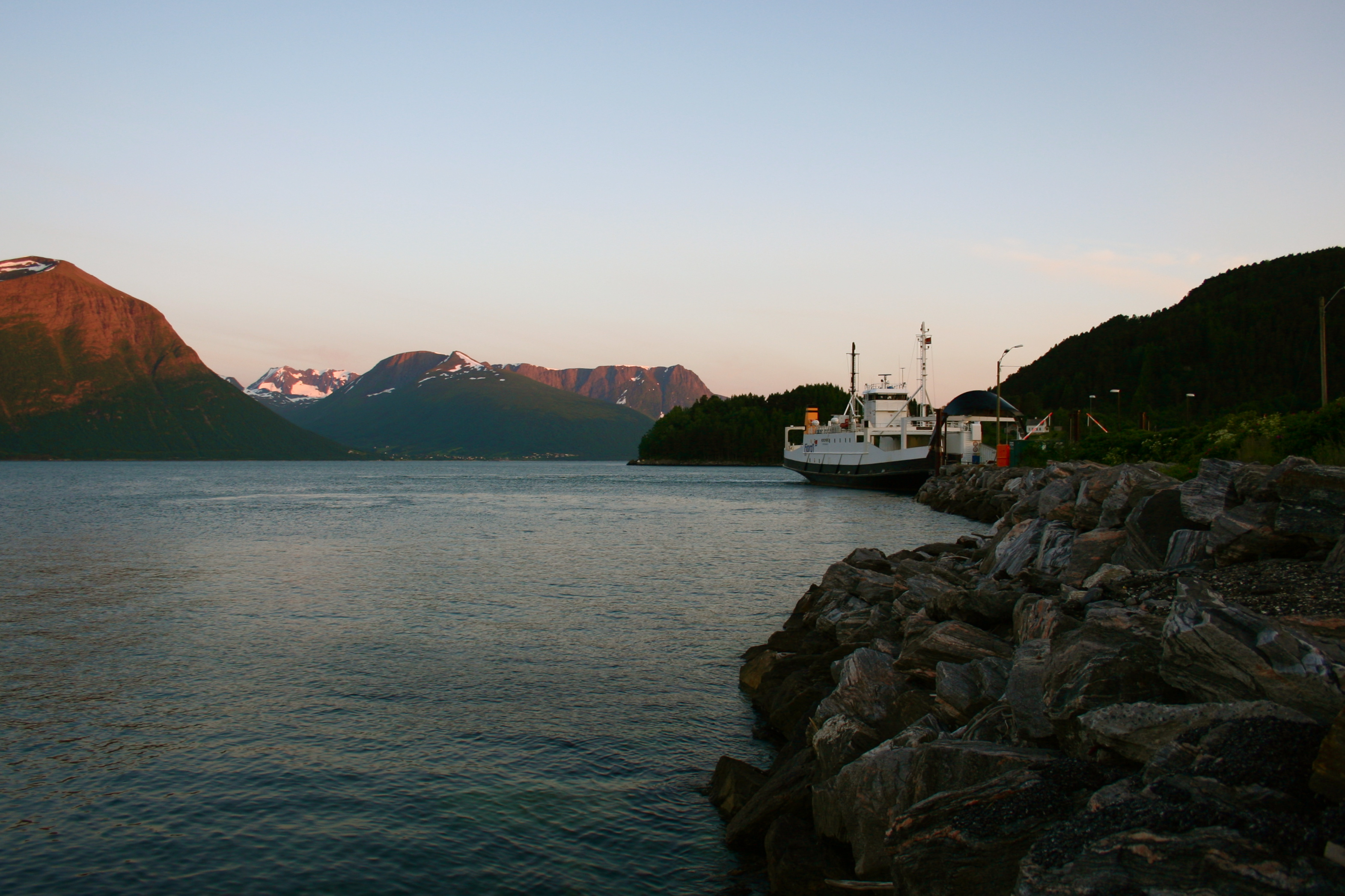
View of the Solevågen ferry quay

Sula Municipality is noted for strong traditions in the field of music. Nils Petter Molvær grew up in Langevåg. Also, the community harbours a strong maritime heritage. The influence of neighbouring city of Ålesund is strong; many live in Sula while working in Ålesund, which is a short ferry ride or a longer car ride away.

== Economy ==
Manufacturing and production is the most important economical sector. Shipyards, fish processing, textile manufacturing, and furniture production are especially vital. The most famous clothing brand from Sula is Devold of Norway, with high quality woolen sweaters and underwear.

== Transportation ==
Transportation in the municipality includes the European route E39 highway and several minor highways. The E39 highway enters Sula from the north (Ålesund) and it crosses the bridge at Vegsundet and continues west and then south to the Solevågen ferry quay where there are regular ferry routes to Festøya in Ørsta Municipality, across the Storfjorden. Also, there is a ferry connection in southwestern portion of Sula. This ferry has regular routes across the Sulafjorden from Sulasund to the village of Hareid on the island of Hareidlandet in Hareid Municipality.

== Notable people ==
- Anton Ludvig Alvestad (1883 in Sula – 1956), a politician, government minister, and Mayor of Ålesund Municipality in 1920–1921
- Inger Giskeødegård (born 1956 in Langevåg), an autodidact illustrator
- Cecilie Fiskerstrand (born 1996), a footballer who plays goalkeeper for Brighton & Hove Albion W.F.C.

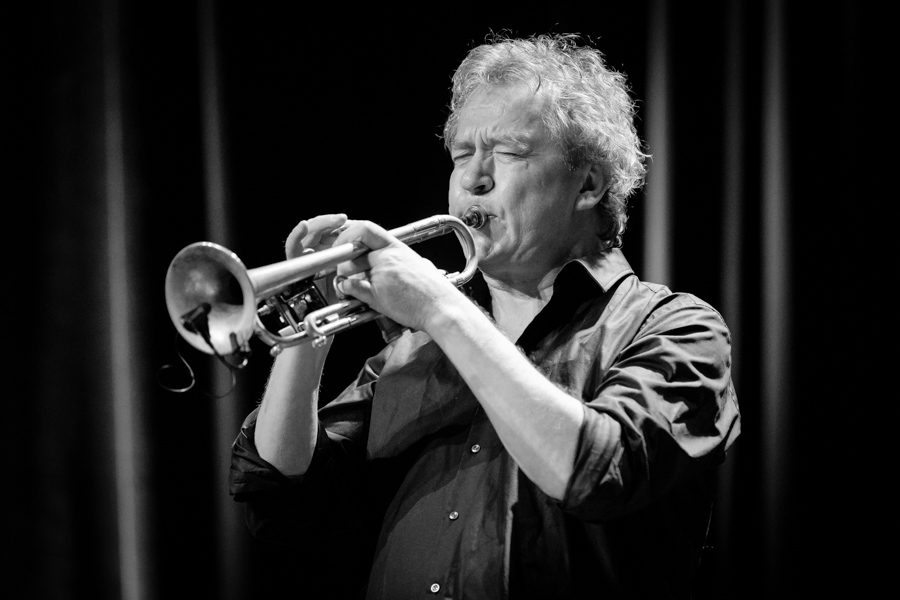
Nils Petter Molvær, 2019

=== Musicians ===
- Stein Erik Tafjord (born 1953 in Langevåg), a jazz musician (tuba) and one of The Brazz Brothers
- Runar Tafjord (born 1957 in Langevåg), a jazz French horn player and one of The Brazz Brothers
- Nils Petter Molvær (born 1960 on Sula), a jazz trumpeter, composer, and record producer
- Harald Devold (1964 in Langevåg – 2016), a jazz musician (alto & soprano saxophone and flute)
- Hild Sofie Tafjord (born 1974 in Langevåg), a jazz musician (French horn)
- Kåre Nymark (born 1974 in Langevåg), a jazz trumpeter and composer
- Robert Post (born 1979 in Langevåg), a singer-songwriter
- Lena Nymark (born 1980), a jazz singer and music teacher who was raised on the island Sula
