= Tafjord (surname) =

Tafjord is a surname. Notable people with the surname include:

- Ann Eli Tafjord (born 1976), Norwegian cross-country skier
- Hild Sofie Tafjord (born 1974), Norwegian French horn player
- Runar Tafjord (born 1957), Norwegian French horn player
- Stein Erik Tafjord (born 1953), Norwegian jazz musician
