= Valen Church =

Church in Vestland, Norway

- Valen kyrkje
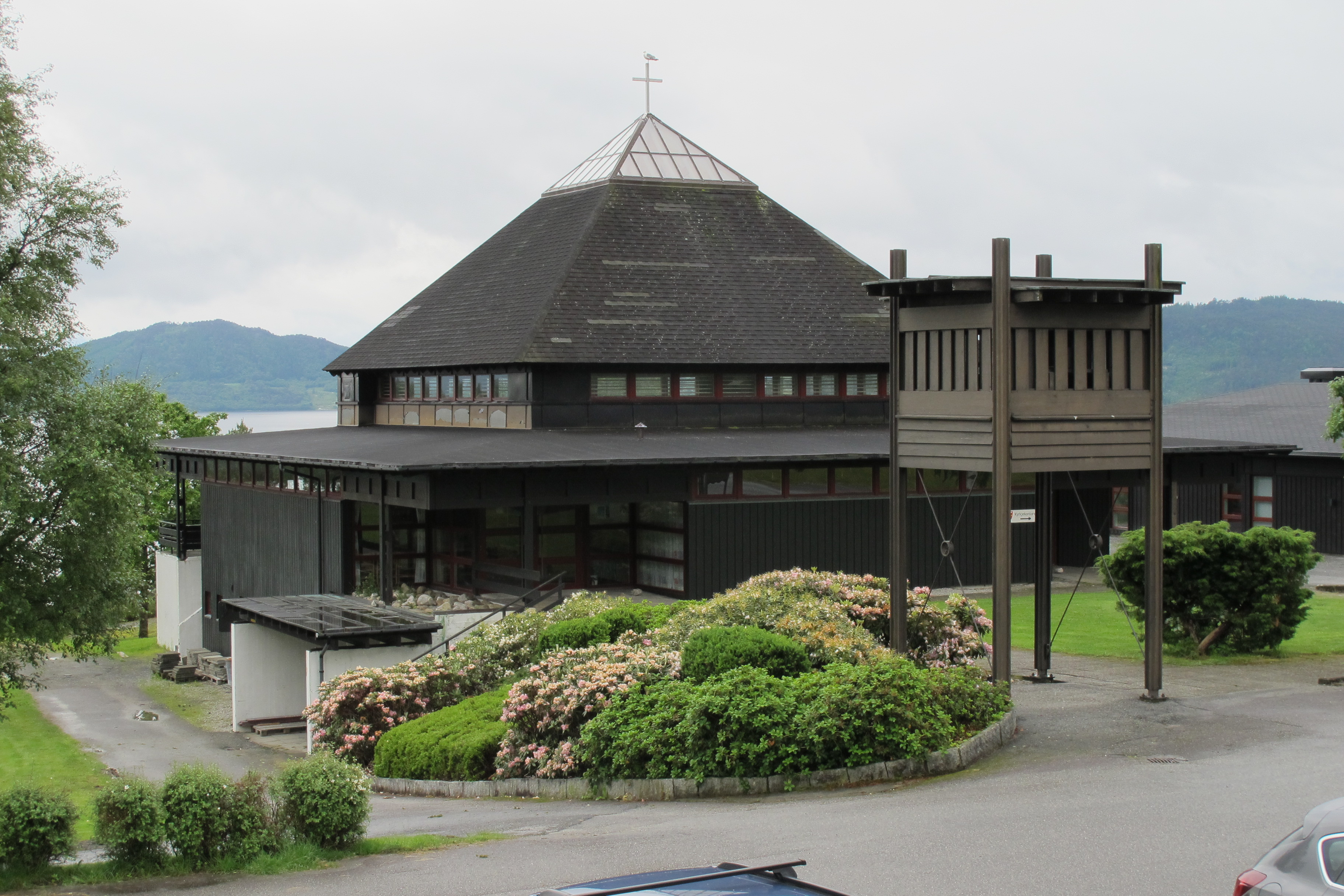
- View of the church
- Valen Church
- 59°49′58″N 5°46′26″E
- Location: Kvinnherad Municipality, Vestland
- Country: Norway
- Denomination: Church of Norway
- Churchmanship: Evangelical Lutheran

History
- Status: Parish church
- Founded: 1978
- Consecrated: 1978

Architecture
- Functional status: Active
- Architect: Aksel Fronth
- Architectural type: Rectangular
- Completed: 1978 (48 years ago)

Specifications
- Capacity: 300
- Materials: Wood

Administration
- Diocese: Bjørgvin bispedømme
- Deanery: Sunnhordland prosti
- Parish: Husnes og Holmedal

Valen Church (Norwegian: Valen kyrkje) is a parish church of the Church of Norway in Kvinnherad Municipality in Vestland county, Norway. It is located in the village of Valen. It is one of the three churches for the Husnes og Holmedal parish which is part of the Sunnhordland prosti (deanery) in the Diocese of Bjørgvin. The modern, brown, wooden church was built in a rectangular design in 1978 using plans drawn up by the architect Aksel Fronth. The church seats about 300 people.

== History ==
During the 1970s, planning for a new church in Valen took place. The architect Aksel Fronth was hired to design the building. It has a very similar design to Landro Church and Olsvik Church which Fronth also designed. The new church was completed and consecrated in 1978.

== See also ==
- List of churches in Bjørgvin
