= Sula, Møre og Romsdal =

Island in Møre og Romsdal, Norway

Sula
- Interactive map of Sula

Geography
- Location: Møre og Romsdal, Norway
- Coordinates: 62.4153°N 6.1337°E
- Area: 59 km^{2} (23 sq mi)
- Length: 16 km (9.9 mi)
- Width: 6 km (3.7 mi)
- Highest elevation: 776 m (2546 ft)
- Highest point: Tverrfjellet

Administration
- Norway
- County: Møre og Romsdal
- Municipality: Sula Municipality

Sula (Urban East Norwegian: [ˈsʉ̀ːɽɑ]) is an island in Sula Municipality in Møre og Romsdal county, Norway. The island (and municipality) are part of the Ålesund Region surrounding the city of Ålesund. The 59-square-kilometre (23 sq mi) island lies north of the Storfjorden, northeast of the Sulafjorden, and south of the Borgundfjorden. The island is connected to the nearby island of Uksenøya by a short bridge on the European route E39 highway. The island is mountainous, with almost all residents living in the northern and eastern shores. The southwestern half of the island is mountains, the highest being the 776-metre (2,546 ft) tall mountain Tverrfjellet (the peak is named Vardane). Most residents live in the municipal centre, Langevåg, in the north, and Fiskarstrand and Mauseidvåg are other large population centres. There are two churches on the island: Langevåg Church and Indre Sula Church.

== History ==
The island of Sula was historically divided between the old Borgund Municipality and Hareid Municipality, with the sparsely populated southwestern part of the island belonging to Hareid Municipality. On 1 July 1958, the part of Hareid Municipality on the island of Sula was administratively transferred to Borgund Municipality, uniting the whole island under one local government. Then on 1 January 1968, Borgund Municipality was merged with the town of Ålesund, so the island of Sula became a part of the new Ålesund Municipality. On 1 January 1977, the island of Sula and some small surrounding islands were separated from Ålesund Municipality to form the new Sula Municipality.

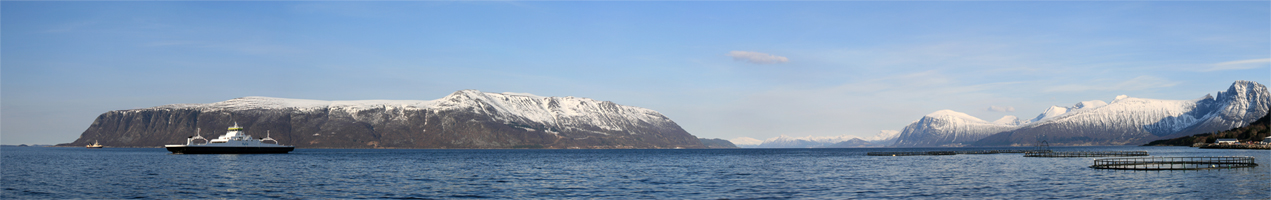
Sula panorama

== See also ==
- List of islands of Norway
