= The Brazz Brothers =

Norwegian jazz band

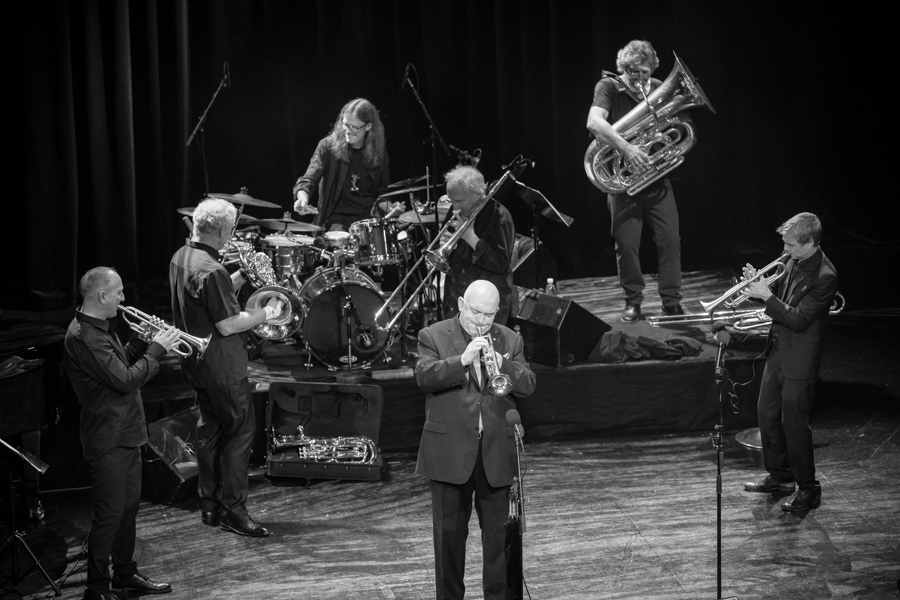
- Brazz Brothers at stage with James Morrisson in 2017

Background information
- Also known as: Brazz Bros
- Origin: Langevåg, Sula Municipality, Norway
- Genres: Jazz
- Years active: 1981–present
- Labels: BrazzRecords; Norsk Plateproduksjon
- Members: Helge Førde; Jan Magne Førde; Jarle Førde; Kenneth Ekornes; Runar Tafjord; Stein Erik Tafjord
- Past members: Egil «Bop» Johansen (1945-1998); Marcus Lewin
- Website: www.brazzbrothers.com

The Brazz Brothers, alias Brazz Bros (established 1981 in Langevåg, Sula Municipality, Norway) is a Norwegian jazz band. They are particularly known for their improvisations, and for the cooperation with Lester Bowie.

== Biography ==
Brazz Brothers was initiated by the brothers Jarle, Jan Magne and Helge Førde, together with the brothers Runar and Stein Erik Tafjord in 1981 as a pure Brass Quintet. They had played together in «Langevåg Skulekorps». The Førde brothers had already been part of «Ytre Suløens Jassensemble» in 1976 at Jazz & Heritage Festival in New Orleans, USA first Norwegian jazz band.

In 1985 the Norwegian drum legend Egil «Bop» Johansen (1934–1998) joined the band, and together they played more than 1200 concerts. After his demise Marcus Lewin from Eskilstuna, Sweden was asked to be his successor. In the period 1990–1995, they had an extensive tour with the American trumpet star Lester Bowie.

In 1986 The Brazz Brothers started the recording of their first album, Brazzy Landscapes. The album comprised the band's own compositions and arrangements, with the appearance of the British singer Phil Minton. The music combines traditional and contemporary jazz with traditional folk music from different parts of the world, with strong representation from the Scandinavian folk tradition. The band has released several albums in collaboration with other musicians, both well-known and underground. They have toured both in Norway and internationally, in the US, Africa, Asia and large parts of Europe, and deliver more than 120 concerts a year. All members also conducted a number of solo projects.

Many school band members throughout Norway have been acquainted with the group throughout their course in learning to play without notes, which the group holds both for beginners, advanced, professional and music educators both in and out of Norway.

== Band members ==
=== Present members ===
- Jarle Førde - trumpet and flugelhorn
- Jan Magne Førde - trumpet and flygelhorn
- Runar Tafjord - French horn
- Helge Førde - trombone
- Stein Erik Tafjord - tuba
- Kenneth Ekornes - drums (2009–)

=== Past members ===
- Egil «Bop» Johansen - drums (1985–1998)
- Marcus Lewin - drums (1998–2009)

== Honors ==
- Gammleng-prisen 2007 i klassen jazz
- The first Sildajazz-prisen 2000

== Discography ==
- 1987: Brazzy Landscapes
- 1989: Live at Oslo Jazz House
- 1992: Norwegian Air (Norsk Plateproduksjon)
- 1993: AfroBrazz (Norsk Plateproduksjon)
- 1994: All Included ()
- 1995: Julefergå (Norske Gram)
- 1996: The Brazz Brothers and Dutch Marine Band ()
- 1996: Brazzy Voices (In+Out Records), with Lester Bowie
- 1997: Roll Tide Roll ()
- 1998: New Orleans Parade | Towards The Sea
- 1999: Ngoma (BrazzRecords)
- 2000: Aftenvind (BrazzRecords), with Povl Dissing
- 2001: Aquarium (BrazzRecords)
- 2003: Live in Cape Town (BrazzRecords)
- 2004: African Marketplace (BrazzRecords), with «Kongelige Norske Marines Musikkorps»
- 2004: Rosalina (BrazzRecords), with Povl Dissing and Benny Andersen
- 2007: Vågåblot (BrazzRecords), with «Vågå Spelmannslag»

== Television ==
- 1995: Julefergå Julekalender

Awards
Preceded by First award in 2000	Recipient of the Sildajazzprisen; 2000	Succeeded by Egil Kapstad
Preceded by Trygve Seim	Recipient of the Open class Gammleng-prisen; 2007	Succeeded by Jon Balke
