= Morten Gunnar Larsen =

Norwegian jazz pianist and composer (born 1955)

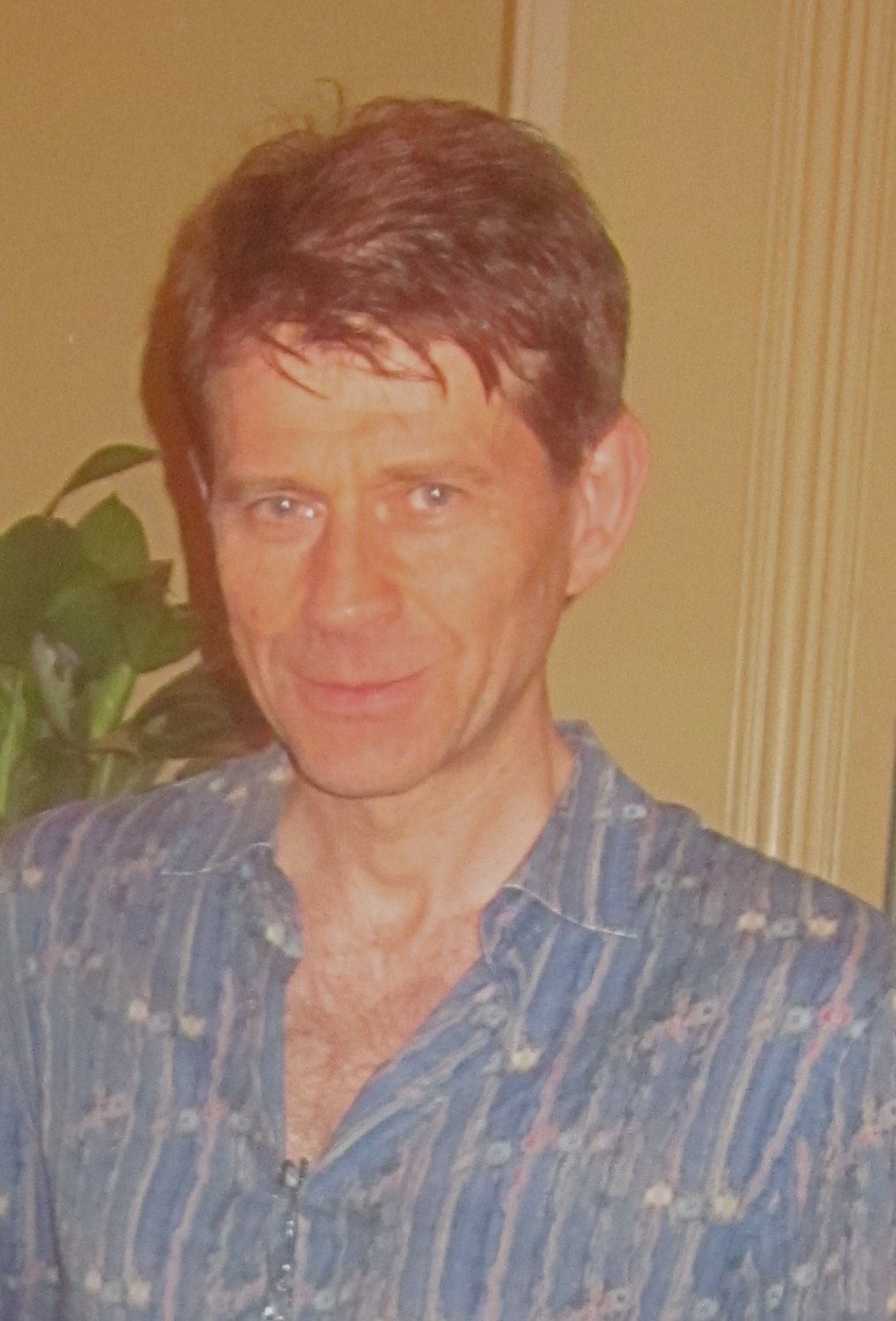
- Larsen in 2013

Background information
- Born: 1 October 1955 (age 70); Oslo, Norway
- Genres: Jazz
- Occupations: Musician, composer
- Instrument: Piano
- Years active: 1975–present
- Labels: Hot Club, Herman, Decca
- Website: opheliaragtime.com

Morten Gunnar Larsen (born 1 October 1955) is a Norwegian jazz pianist and composer, well known for several ragtime and stride piano recordings and collaborations.

== Career ==
Larsen studied classical piano at Norges Musikkhøgskole (1978). In 1975 he had his debut record, Classic Rags and Stomps, for which he won Spellemannprisen in 1976. He next founded Ophelia Ragtime Orchestra in 1977 and performed with stride pianist Eubie Blake, for whom Larsen composed Memories of Eubie. Larsen worked in New Orleans over longer periods of time, resulting in a tour and the performance One mo' time (1979–81) written by Vernel Bagneris.

Larsen's collaboration with Bagneris continued with the performance Jelly Roll!! – The Music and the Man, dedicated Jelly Roll Morton, and performed at Oslo Jazzfestival 1990. It also had eleven months at Off-Broadway (1994–95) and was released as a CD (GHB, 1996). This work gave Larsen the OBIE Award 1995. He had earlier received the Buddy Award of Foreningen norske jazzmusikeres "Årets jazzmusiker" (1992) in his home country. He participated in several recordings in the Magnolia Jazzband (1974–93) and Ytre Suløens Jassensemble up until 1992 and has participated in Norbert Susemihl's Joyful Gumbo (2011–present).

In a review of Larsen's 2015 CD Sorgenfri for the music magazine OffBeat, the pianist Tom McDermott described him as "the greatest ragtime player in the world, and one of the world’s best traditional jazz pianists".

== Discography ==
- Classic Rags and Stomps (Arne Bendiksen A/S, 1975) LP; all tracks later reissued on Charleston Rag CD
- Don't You Leave Me Here (Sonet, 1978) LP; all tracks later reissued on Charleston Rag CD
- Plays Robert Clemente (Stomp Off Records, 1981) LP; all tracks reissued on the Ophelia Ragtime Orchestra CD Echoes from the Snowball Club (PianoMania Music, 1995)
- Echo of Spring (Hot Club, 1983)
- Maple Leaf Rag (Herman Records, 1989)
- Hot Jazz, Pop Jazz and Ragtime (PianoMania Music Publishing, 1991)
- Charleston Rag (Herman Records, 1995) CD compilation of all the tracks from Larsen's first two LPs
- Fingerbreaker (Decca, 1999)
- Rhapsody (Curling Legs, 2000) with clarinettist Georg Michael Reiss
- Ragtime and Rhapsody (Herman Records, 2005) 1997 concert in Levanger
- In a Rag Bag (Meantime Records, 2012) with singer Karin Krog
- Ernesto Nazareth: Creole Connections (Lawo Classics, 2014)
- Sorgenfri (Herman Records, 2015)

Awards
Preceded by Stein Erik Tafjord	Recipient of the Buddyprisen; 1992	Succeeded by Egil Johansen
