= Jens Graff =

German-born Norwegian dancer (born 1942)

Jens Graff (born 3 October 1942) is a German-born Norwegian dancer. He was born in Wangerooge, and is a brother of illustrator and cartoonist Finn Graff. His German father died during the Second World War, and the family moved to Norway in 1946. As a child he trained ballet with Rita Tori. He spent most of his dancing career with the Royal Swedish Opera in Stockholm. He served as ballet director of the Norwegian National Opera and Ballet for three years from 1980, and then returned as dancer to the Royal Swedish Opera. From 1995 to 1998 he was artistic director of the dance company Nye Carte Blanche in Bergen. From 2003 he was appointed professor at the University of Dance and Circus in Stockholm. He was decorated Knight of the Order of Dannebrog in 1974.
