= Brattvåg =

Village in Haram Municipality, Norway

- Village
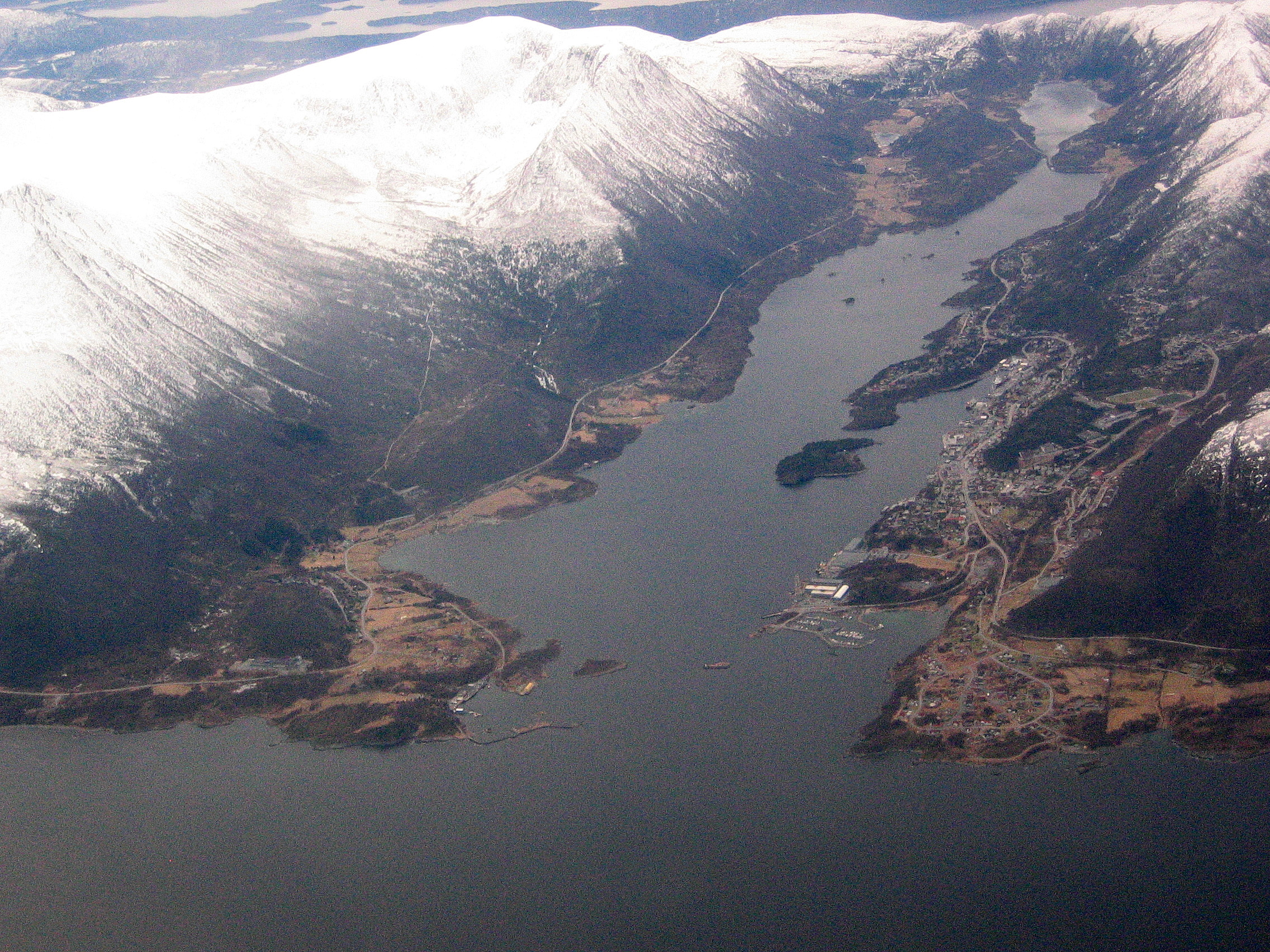
- View of Brattvåg on the right side of the fjord
- Interactive map of Brattvåg
- Location within Møre og Romsdal Location within Norway
- Coordinates: 62.5999°N 6.4442°E
- Country: Norway
- Region: Western Norway
- County: Møre og Romsdal
- District: Sunnmøre
- Municipality: Haram Municipality

Area
  - Total: 1.75 km^{2} (0.68 sq mi)
- Elevation: 26 m (85 ft)

Population (2024)
  - Total: 2,437
  - Density: 1,393/km^{2} (3,610/sq mi)
- Time zone: UTC+01:00 (CET)
  - Summer (DST): UTC+02:00 (CEST)
- Post Code: 6270 Brattvåg

Brattvåg is the administrative centre of Haram Municipality in Møre og Romsdal county, Norway. The village is located on the Norwegian mainland, along the west side of the Samfjorden. It is located about 12.5 kilometres (7.8 mi) northwest of the villages of Vatne/Eidsvik.

The 1.75-square-kilometre (430-acre) village has a population (2024) of 2,437 and a population density of 1,393 inhabitants per square kilometre (3,610/sq mi).

Brattvåg has three schools: one primary school (barneskule), a lower secondary school (ungdomsskule), and an upper secondary school (vidaregåande). Brattvåg Church is the main church for this area of the municipality. Brattvåg houses factories for both Kongsberg Gruppen and Vard. Kongsberg Deck Machinery Brattvåg is the world's largest manufacturer of winches. The sports club Brattvåg IL is located in the village.

The newspaper Haramsnytt is published in Brattvåg.
