= Tyssedal Church =

Church in Vestland, Norway

- Tyssedal kyrkje
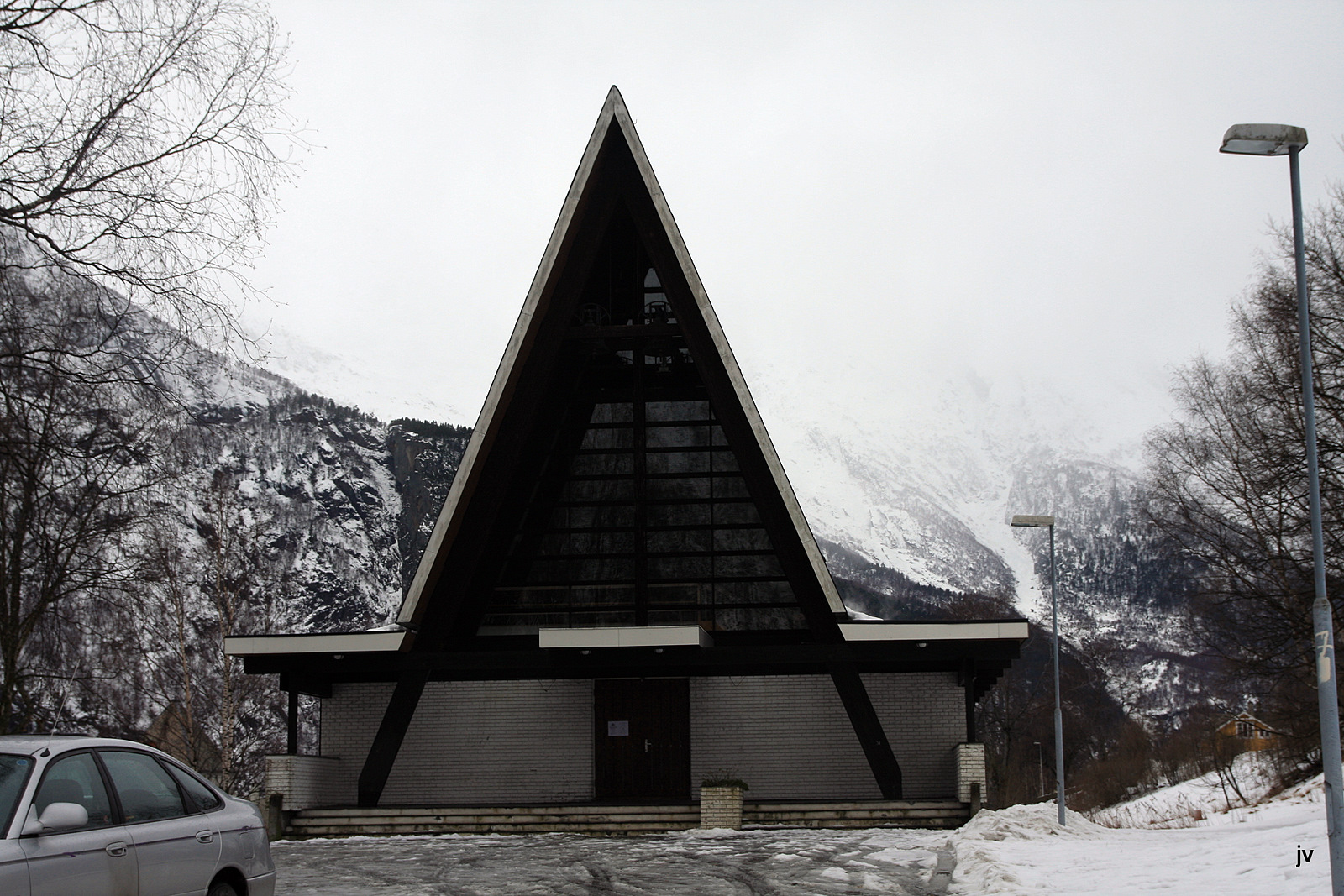
- View of the church
- Tyssedal Church
- 60°07′02″N 6°33′44″E
- Location: Ullensvang, Vestland
- Country: Norway
- Denomination: Church of Norway
- Churchmanship: Evangelical Lutheran

History
- Status: Parish church
- Founded: 1965
- Consecrated: 4 April 1965

Architecture
- Functional status: Active
- Architect: Aksel Fronth
- Architectural type: Rectangular
- Completed: 1965 (61 years ago)

Specifications
- Capacity: 190
- Materials: Concrete, brick, wood

Administration
- Diocese: Bjørgvin bispedømme
- Deanery: Hardanger og Voss prosti
- Parish: Tyssedal
- Norwegian Cultural Heritage Site
- Type: Church
- Status: Not protected
- ID: 85699

Tyssedal Church (Norwegian: Tyssedal kyrkje) is a parish church of the Church of Norway in Ullensvang Municipality in Vestland county, Norway. It is located in the village of Tyssedal. It is the church for the Tyssedal parish which is part of the Hardanger og Voss prosti (deanery) in the Diocese of Bjørgvin. The white, brick church was built in a modern-looking rectangular design in 1965 using plans drawn up by the architect Aksel Fronth. The church seats about 190 people.

== History ==
Starting in 1928, the people of Tyssedal began petitioning the government for their own church. It wasn't until the 1960s when their wish came true. A new church, including a full basement which has bathrooms and meeting rooms was designed by Aksel Fronth. The foundation stone was laid on 29 February 1964 and work carried on for about a year. The new church was consecrated on 4 April 1965 by the Bishop Per Juvkam.

== See also ==
- List of churches in Bjørgvin
