= Finn Graff =

Norwegian illustrator (born 1938)

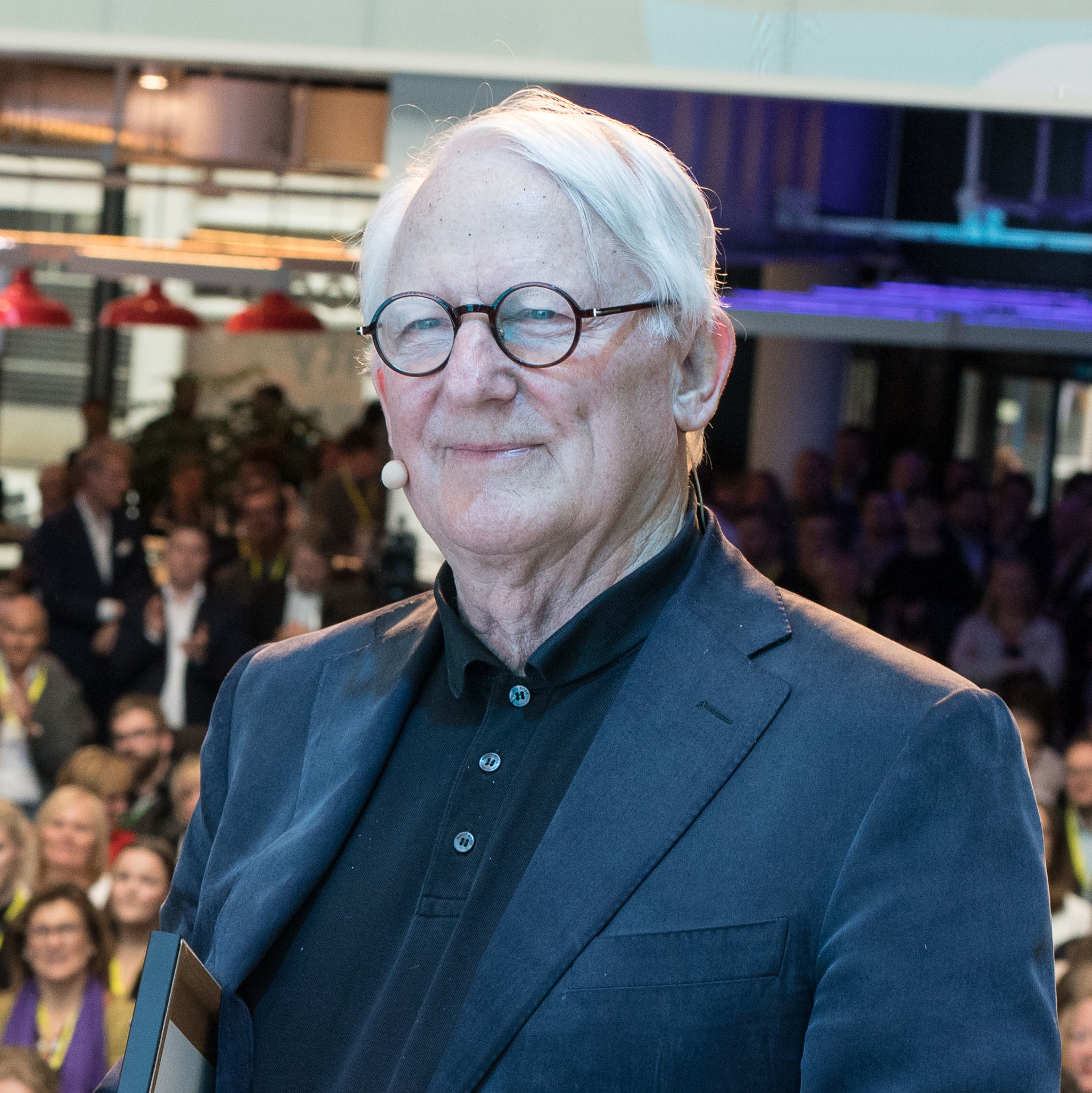
Finn Graff, 2018

Finn Graff (born 25 December 1938) is a Norwegian illustrator.

He was born in Wangerooge, Germany as a son of aviator Heinz Friedrich Wöhlecke (1909–1944) and translator Margit-Ruth Graff (1914–2000). He was an older brother of Jens Graff. He moved to Norway in 1946, but had lost his father to the war, and lived at the orphanage Christiania Opfostringshus from 1949 to 1954. He did however take higher education, at the Norwegian National Academy of Craft and Art Industry from 1959 to 1963. In 1960, he was hired as an illustrator and political cartoonist in the newspaper Morgenposten. From 1963 to 1988 he worked in Arbeiderbladet and from 1988 in Dagbladet. He has also illustrated several book covers. He is represented in the National Gallery of Norway. He won the Editorial Cartoon of the Year award in 2000 and 2005. He was decorated as Knight First Class of the Royal Norwegian Order of St. Olav in 2007.

Awards
Preceded by Egil Nyhus (not awarded 1999)	Editorial Cartoon of the Year in Norway; 2000	Succeeded by Inger Giskeødegård
Preceded by Per Elvestuen (not awarded 2004)	Editorial Cartoon of the Year in Norway; 2005	Succeeded by Siri Dokken (not awarded 2006)
