= Aksel Fronth =

Norwegian architect

Aksel Ludvig Fronth
- Born: 6 March 1925; Sarpsborg, Norway
- Died: 22 March 2000 (aged 75); Fredrikstad, Norway
- Occupation: Architect

Aksel Ludvig Fronth (1925–2000) was a Norwegian architect. He particularly specialized in building modern-style churches.

== Works ==
- Tyssedal Church (1965)
- Greåker Church (1974)
- Landro Church (1977)
- Brattvåg Church (1977)
- Skårer Church (1978)
- Valen Church (1978)
- Indre Sula Church (1984)
- Kjølstad Church (1986)
- Fjellhamar Church (1989)
- Olsvik Church (1990)
