= Inge Grødum =

Norwegian illustrator (born 1943)

- Born: 13 August 1943 (age 82); Ulefoss, Norway
- Occupation: Illustrator

Inge Grødum (born 13 August 1943) is a Norwegian illustrator.

He was born in Ulefoss, and attended the Norwegian National Academy of Craft and Art Industry from 1970 to 1973. He worked for the newspaper Nationen from 1973 to 1987 and in Aftenposten since 1987. He has published several books with collections of his editorial cartoons. He won the Editorial Cartoon of the Year award in 2002.

Awards
Preceded by Inger Giskeødegård	Editorial Cartoon of the Year in Norway; 2002	Succeeded by Per Elvestuen
