= Stein Erik Tafjord =

Norwegian tuba player

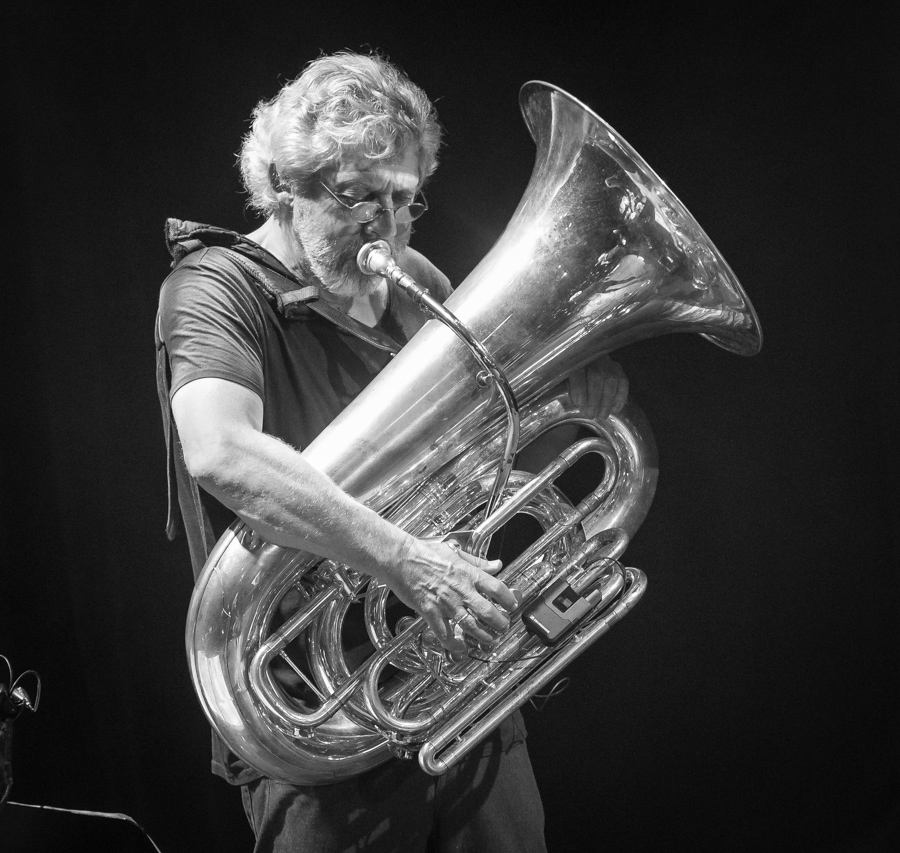
- Tafjord in 2017

Background information
- Born: 26 November 1953 (age 72); Langevåg, Møre og Romsdal
- Origin: Norway
- Genres: Jazz
- Occupations: Musician and composer
- Instrument: Tuba
- Website: brazzbrothers.com/blog/medlemmer/stein-erik-tafjord

Stein Erik Tafjord (born 2 November 1953 in Langevåg, Norway) is a Norwegian jazz musician (tuba), and brother of the French horn player Runar Tafjord. He is most well known for being part of The Brazz Brothers. He was also one of the founders Ytre Suløens Jass Ensemble in 1973, where he played for 17 years. He has four children, including hornplayer Hild Sofie Tafjord.

== Career ==
Tafjord is a graduate of Norges Musikkhøgskole i Oslo. After many years as participant of the Kringkastingsorkesteret, he started as a freelance jazz and studio musician. Tafjord has developed a very unconventional style of playing as improviser, which has had an influence on composers and others musicians, to be more aware of the tuba as instrument.

He has toured with several international orchestras and groups, such as the Scandinavian Tuba Jazz Inc. and Carla Bley Scandinavian Jazz Ensemble. He has worked with the singer and actress Elisabeth Lindland in several different contexts.

== Honors ==
- 1991: Buddyprisen

Awards
Preceded by John Pål Inderberg	Recipient of the Buddyprisen; 1991	Succeeded by Morten Gunnar Larsen
