= Indre Sula Church =

Church in Møre og Romsdal, Norway

- Indre Sula kyrkje
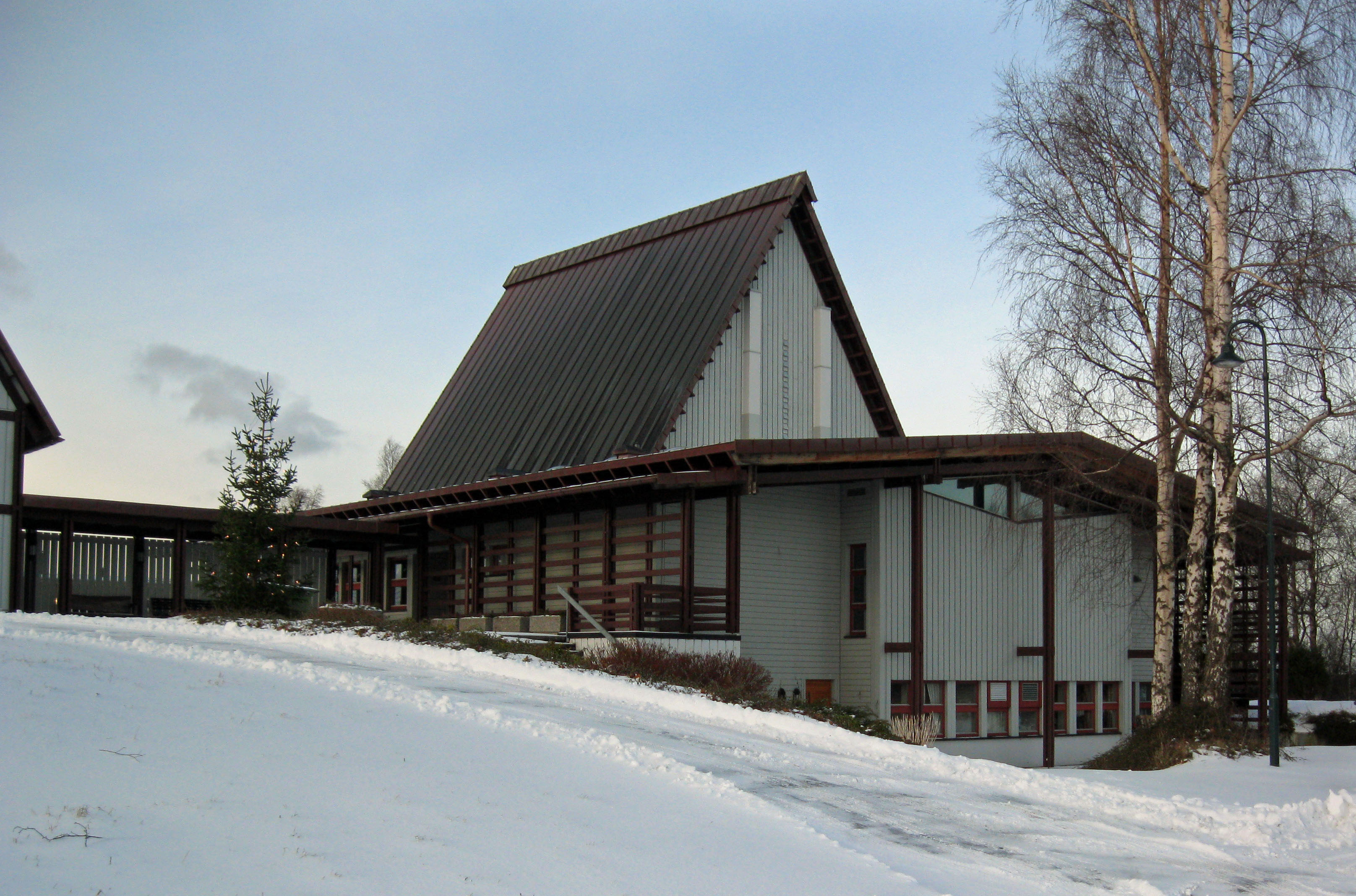
- View of the church
- Indre Sula Church
- 62°25′39″N 6°17′59″E
- Location: Sula Municipality, Møre og Romsdal
- Country: Norway
- Denomination: Church of Norway
- Churchmanship: Evangelical Lutheran

History
- Status: Parish church
- Founded: 1984
- Consecrated: 1984

Architecture
- Functional status: Active
- Architect: Aksel Fronth
- Architectural type: Cruciform
- Completed: 1984 (42 years ago)

Specifications
- Capacity: 290
- Materials: Wood

Administration
- Diocese: Møre bispedømme
- Deanery: Nordre Sunnmøre prosti
- Parish: Sula
- Norwegian Cultural Heritage Site
- Type: Church
- Status: Automatically protected

Indre Sula Church (Norwegian: Indre Sula kyrkje) is a parish church of the Church of Norway in Sula Municipality in Møre og Romsdal county, Norway. It is located in the village of Mauseidvåg on the island of Sula. It is one of the two churches for the Sula parish which is part of the Nordre Sunnmøre prosti (deanery) in the Diocese of Møre. The gray, wooden church was built in a cruciform design in 1984 using plans drawn up by the architect Aksel Fronth. The church seats about 290 people.

== See also ==
- List of churches in Møre
