= Langevåg Church =

Church in Møre og Romsdal, Norway

- Langevåg kyrkje
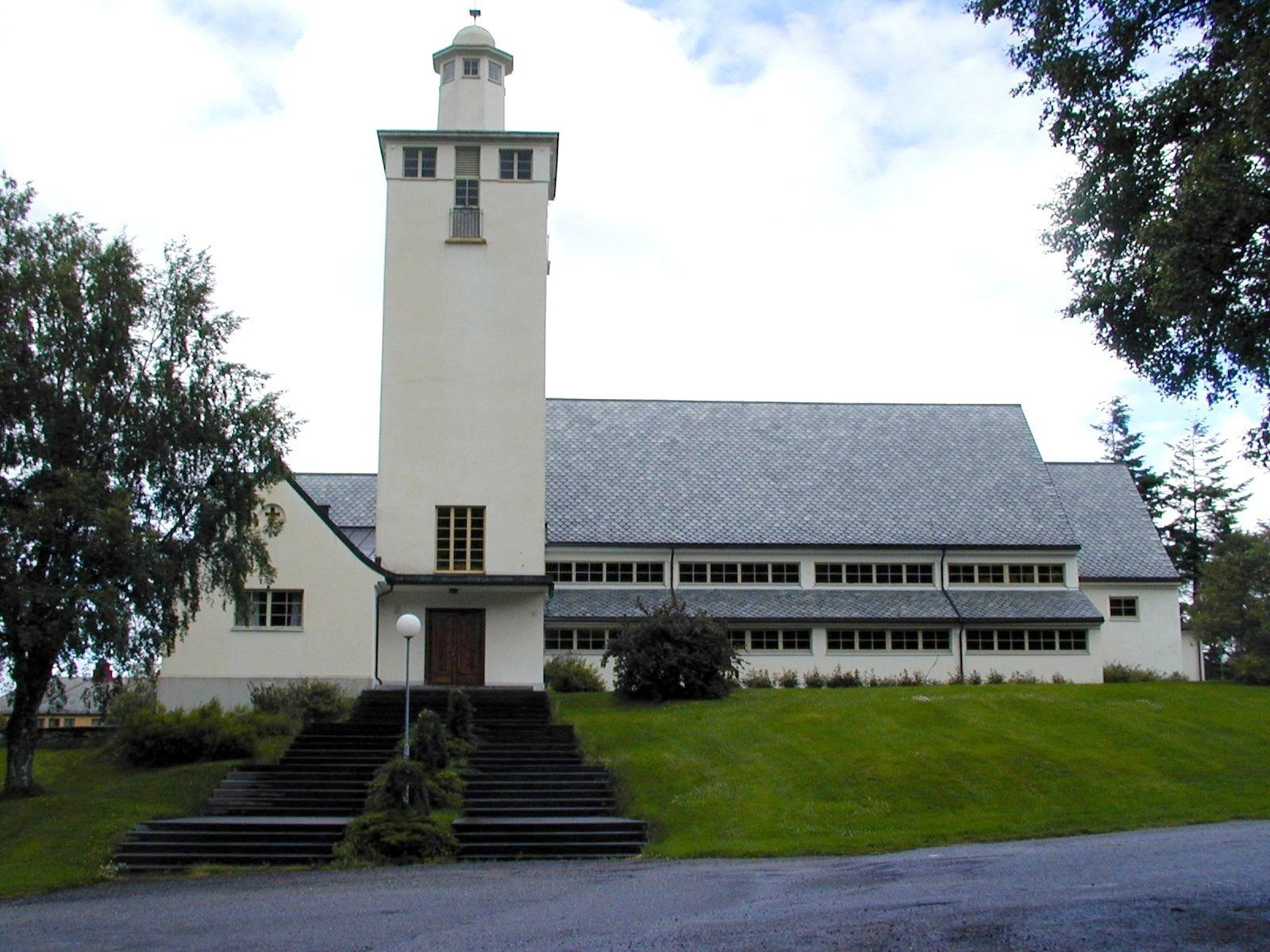
- View of the church
- Langevåg Church
- 62°26′23″N 6°12′17″E
- Location: Sula Municipality, Møre og Romsdal
- Country: Norway
- Denomination: Church of Norway
- Churchmanship: Evangelical Lutheran

History
- Status: Parish church
- Founded: 1948
- Consecrated: 12 June 1948

Architecture
- Functional status: Active
- Architect: Øyvind B. Grimnes
- Architectural type: Long church
- Completed: 1948 (78 years ago)

Specifications
- Capacity: 400
- Materials: Stone

Administration
- Diocese: Møre bispedømme
- Deanery: Nordre Sunnmøre prosti
- Parish: Sula
- Norwegian Cultural Heritage Site
- Type: Church
- Status: Not protected
- ID: 84900

Langevåg Church (Norwegian: Langevåg kyrkje) is a parish church of the Church of Norway in Sula Municipality in Møre og Romsdal county, Norway. It is located in the village of Langevåg on the northern shore of the island of Sula. It is one of the two churches for the Sula parish which is part of the Nordre Sunnmøre prosti (deanery) in the Diocese of Møre. The white, stone church was built in a long church design in 1948 using plans drawn up by the architect Øyvind B. Grimnes. The church seats about 400 people.

== History ==
Throughout history, the island of Sula was part of the Borgund Church parish. In 1932, small prayer house was opened in Langevåg where church services were sometimes held. Planning for a church building began soon after. Sverre Pedersen was first hired as an architect, but that fell through and ultimately the parish hired Øivind Berg Grimnes, who was a city architect in Ålesund. A building permit was issued in May 1941 and construction began soon after. By 1942, the roof was finished, enclosing the building, but then work stopped for a few years due to World War II. A royal resolution was issued in January 1946 formally authorizing the church and the new parish of Sula. The new church was consecrated on 12 June 1948. The building is a brick long church with an asymmetrically placed tower on the south side.

== See also ==
- List of churches in Møre
