= Brattvåg Church =

Church in Møre og Romsdal, Norway

- Brattvåg kyrkje
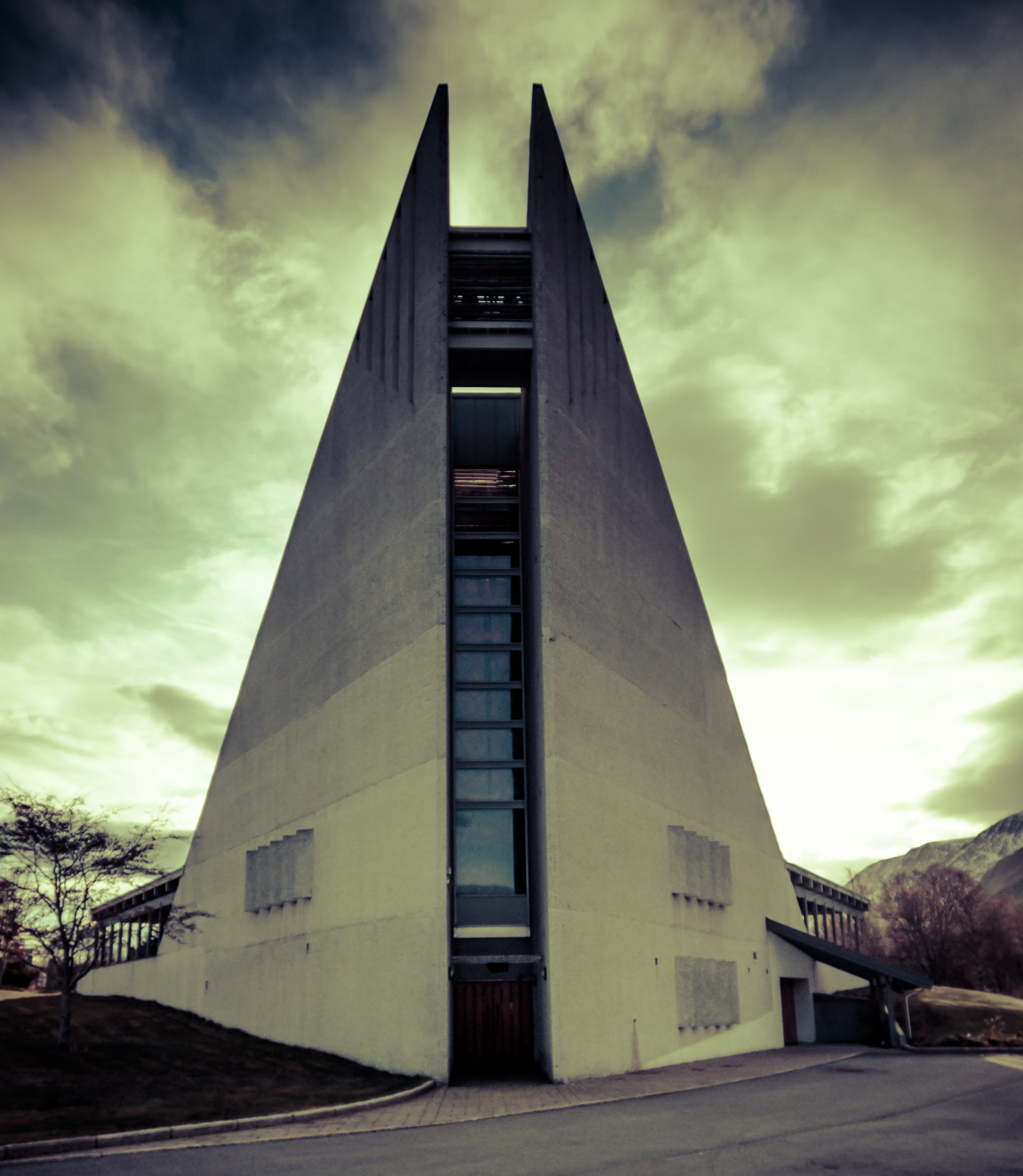
- View of the church
- Brattvåg Church
- 62°36′07″N 6°26′30″E
- Location: Haram Municipality, Møre og Romsdal
- Country: Norway
- Denomination: Church of Norway
- Churchmanship: Evangelical Lutheran

History
- Status: Parish church
- Founded: 1977
- Consecrated: 1977

Architecture
- Functional status: Active
- Architect: Aksel Fronth
- Architectural type: Long church
- Completed: 1977 (49 years ago)

Specifications
- Capacity: 650
- Materials: Concrete and wood

Administration
- Diocese: Møre bispedømme
- Deanery: Nordre Sunnmøre prosti
- Parish: Brattvåg
- Norwegian Cultural Heritage Site
- Type: Church
- Status: Not protected
- ID: 83944

Brattvåg Church (Norwegian: Brattvåg kyrkje) is a parish church of the Church of Norway in Haram Municipality in Møre og Romsdal county, Norway. It is located in the village of Brattvåg. It is one of the two churches for the Brattvåg parish which is part of the Nordre Sunnmøre prosti (deanery) in the Diocese of Møre. The modern-looking concrete church was built in a rectangular design in 1977 using plans drawn up by the architect Aksel Fronth. The church seats about 650 people.

== History ==
During the 20th century, the village of Brattvåg grew up as an industrial centre for Haram Municipality. The church in Brattvåg was built in 1977 using designs by Aksel Fronth. The church was consecrated in 1977. It is a fairly modern looking building with two large triangular walls with a slit of glass in between, forming a somewhat modern take on a church bell tower. The lower level of the building houses a church hall as well as the main entrance to the building while the upper-level houses the main sanctuary.

== Media gallery ==
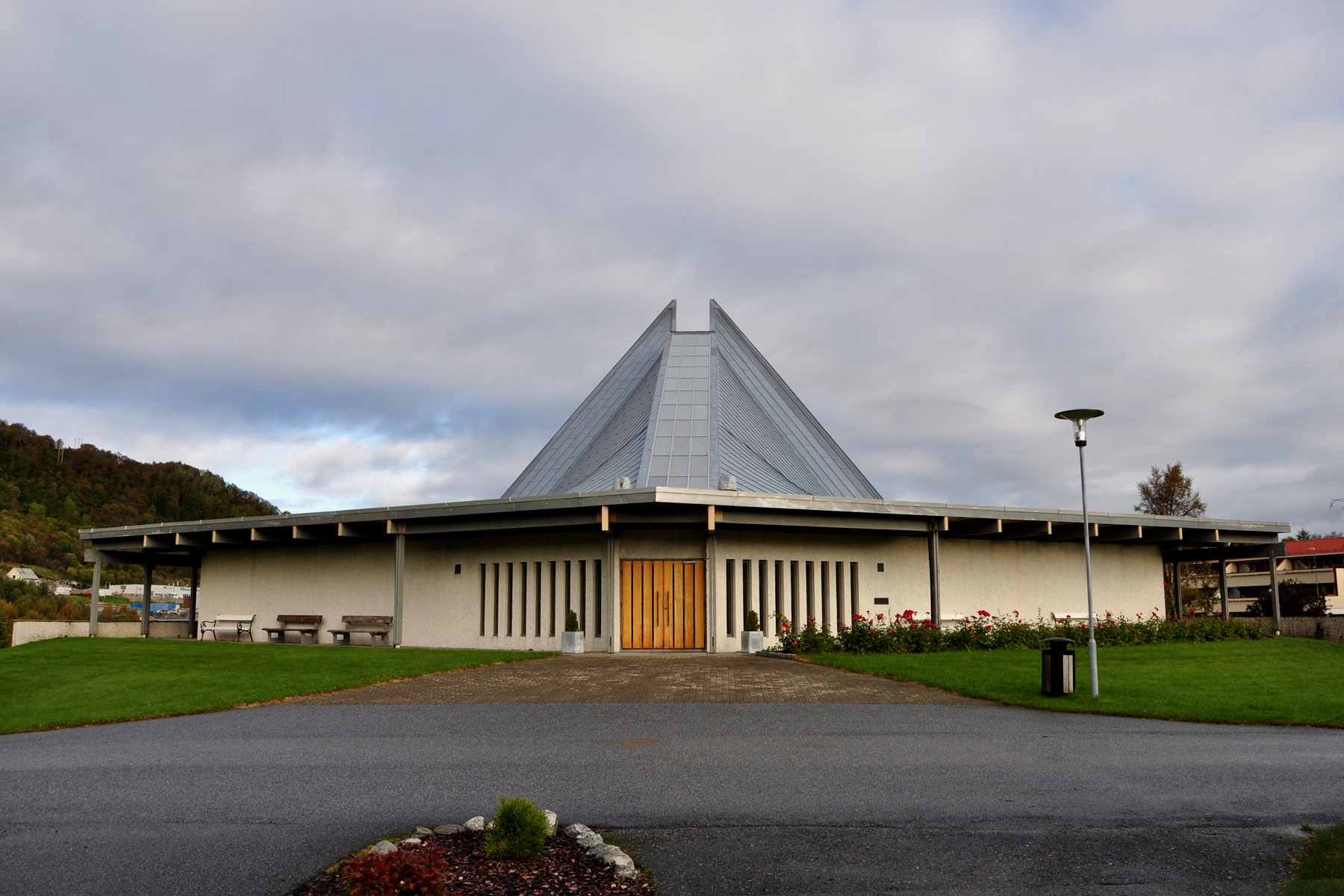

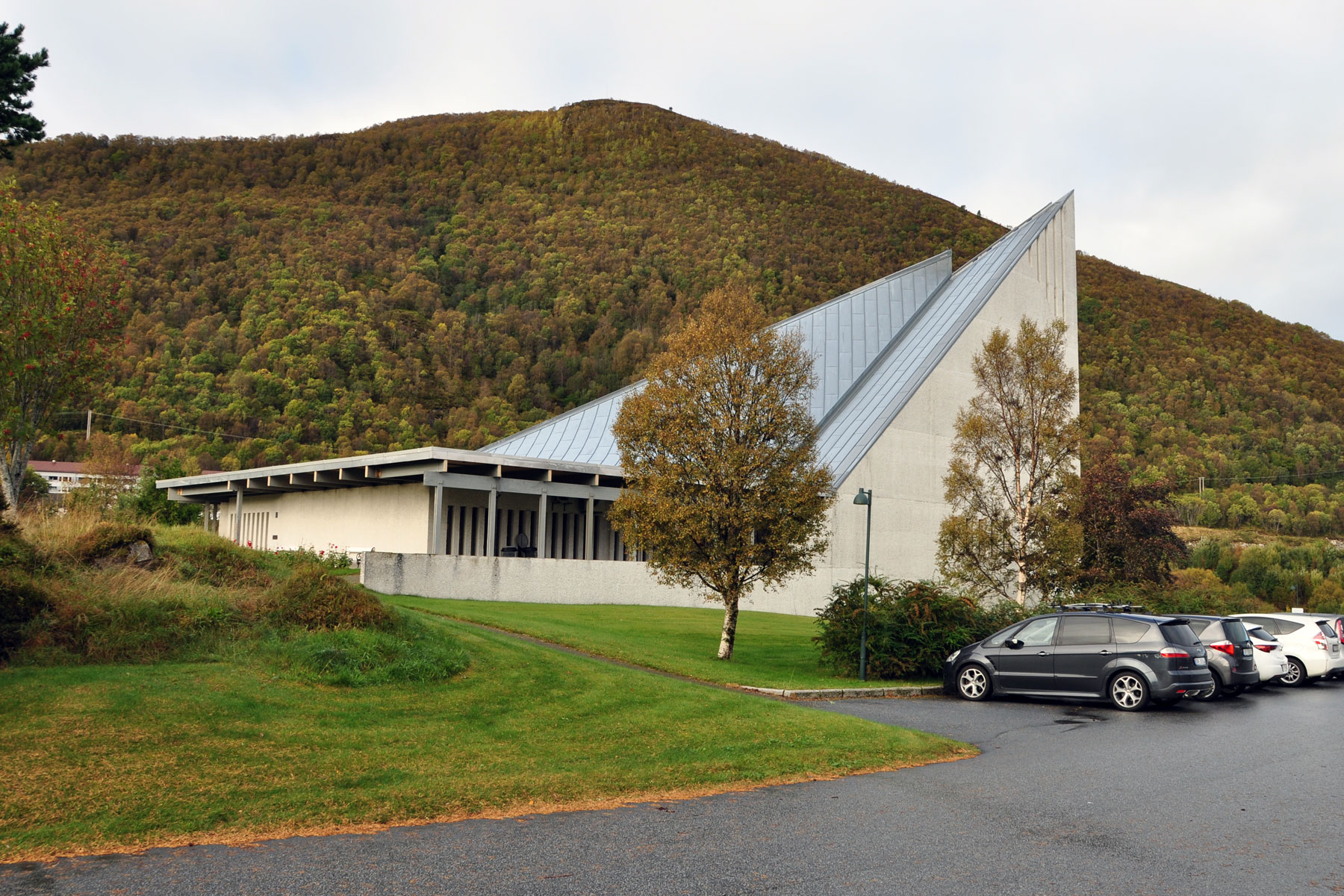

== See also ==
- List of churches in Møre
