= Runar Tafjord =

Norwegian French horn player

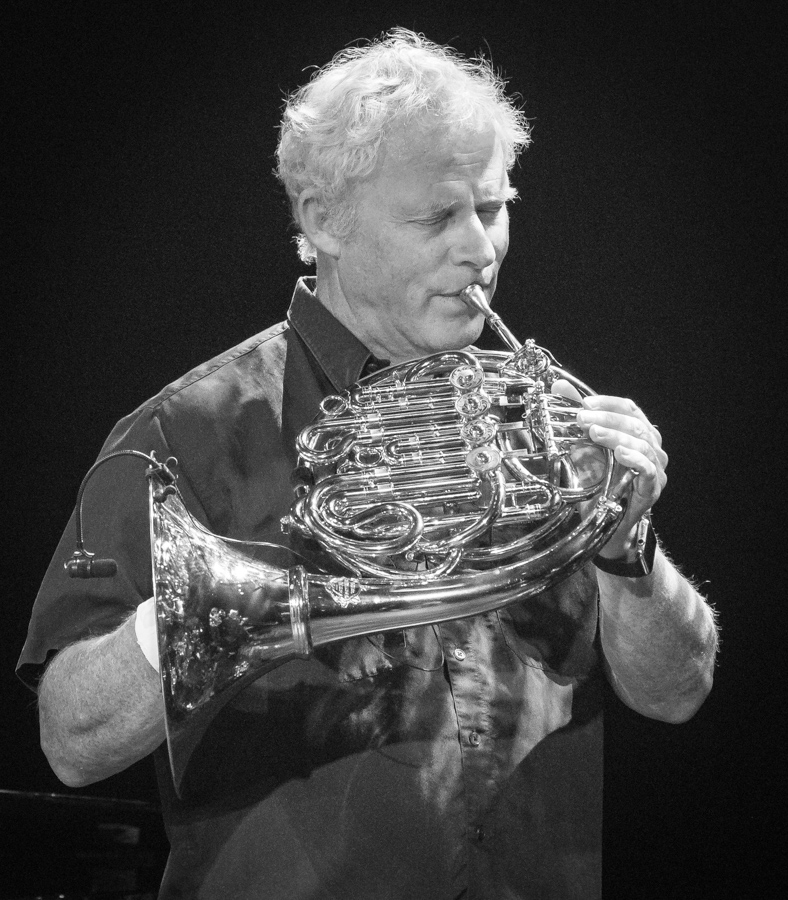
- Runar Tafjord performing in 2017

Background information
- Born: December 14, 1957 (age 68); Langevåg, Møre og Romsdal
- Origin: Norway
- Genres: Jazz, classical music
- Occupations: Musician, orchestra conductor
- Instrument: French horn
- Member of: The Brazz Brothers
- Website: brazzbrothers.com/blog/medlemmer/runar-tafjord

Runar Tafjord (born December 14, 1957, in Langevåg, Norway) is a Norwegian French horn player, brother of the tubaist Stein Erik Tafjord, and uncle of the French horn player Hild Sofie Tafjord. He is best known for being part of The Brazz Brothers.

== Career ==
Tafjord is a graduate of the Norwegian Academy of Music in Oslo. He has for many years played in various Scandinavian orchestras, including Oslo Filharmoniske Orkester, Den Norske Operas Orkester, Bergen Filharmoniske Orkester and 'Gothenburg Philharmonic Orchestra'. He is also a widely used solo artist and studio musician and is one of only five chosen Scandinavian horn players who play jazz. In addition, he is an orchestra conductor and instructor for brass ensembles. In 2011 he received the "Statens arbeidsstipend" from the Norwegian government.

== Discography ==
Within The Brazz Brothers

- 1987: Brazzy Landscapes (Odin Records), with Phil Minton & Egil "Bop" Johansen
- 1993: Norwegian Air (Norsk Plateproduksjon)
- 1994: All Included (Norsk Plateproduksjon)
- 1996: Brazzy Voices (In+Out Records)
- 1999: Ngoma (Brazz Records)
- 2012: Aquarium (Brazz Records)

With Jan Eggum

- 1992: Nesten Ikke Tilstede (Grappa Music)

With Mikhail Alperin

- 2000: Portrait (Jaro Medien)

With Povl Dissing & Benny Andersen

- 2010: For Fuld Udblæsning (CVP Broadcast)
