= Mauseidvåg =

Village in Sula Municipality, Norway

Mauseidvåg Mauseidvågen
- Village
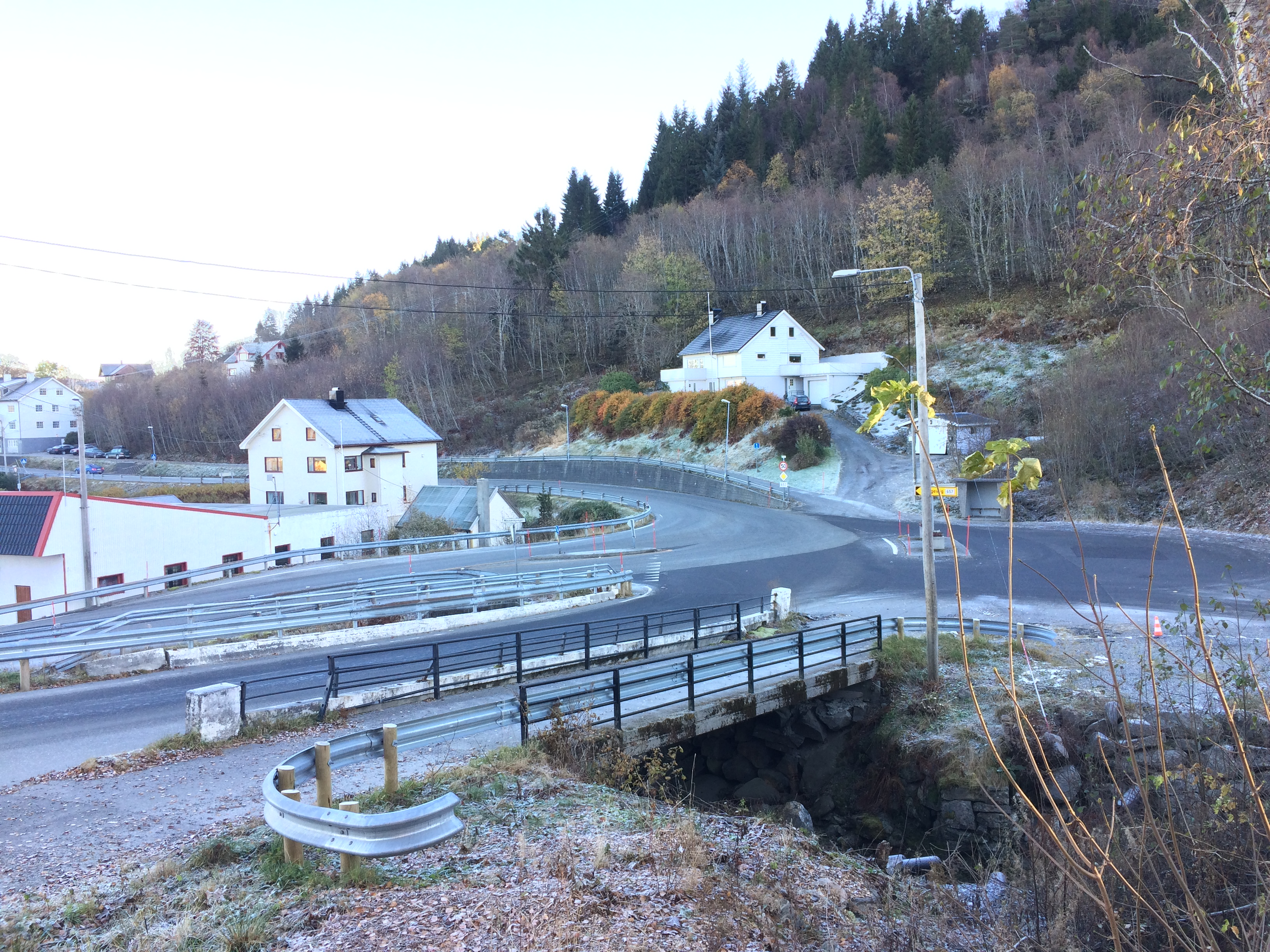
- Mauseidvåg
- Nickname: Måseide
- Interactive map of Mauseidvåg
- Location within Møre og Romsdal Location within Norway
- Coordinates: 62.4211°N 6.2720°E
- Country: Norway
- Region: Western Norway
- County: Møre og Romsdal
- District: Sunnmøre
- Municipality: Sula Municipality
- Elevation: 17 m (56 ft)
- Time zone: UTC+01:00 (CET)
  - Summer (DST): UTC+02:00 (CEST)
- Post Code: 6036 Mauseidvåg

Mauseidvåg or Mauseidvågen is a village in Sula Municipality in Møre og Romsdal county, Norway. It is part of the Ålesund Region and is located about 7 kilometres (4.3 mi) southeast of the municipal center of Langevåg and about 15 kilometres (9.3 mi) south of the town of Ålesund. The Indre Sula Church is located about 1.5 kilometres (0.93 mi) east of the village of Mauseidvåg. The European route E39 highway runs just east of the village too.
