= Tverrfjellet (Sula) =

Mountain in Møre og Romsdal, Norway

- Sulafjellet / Vardane
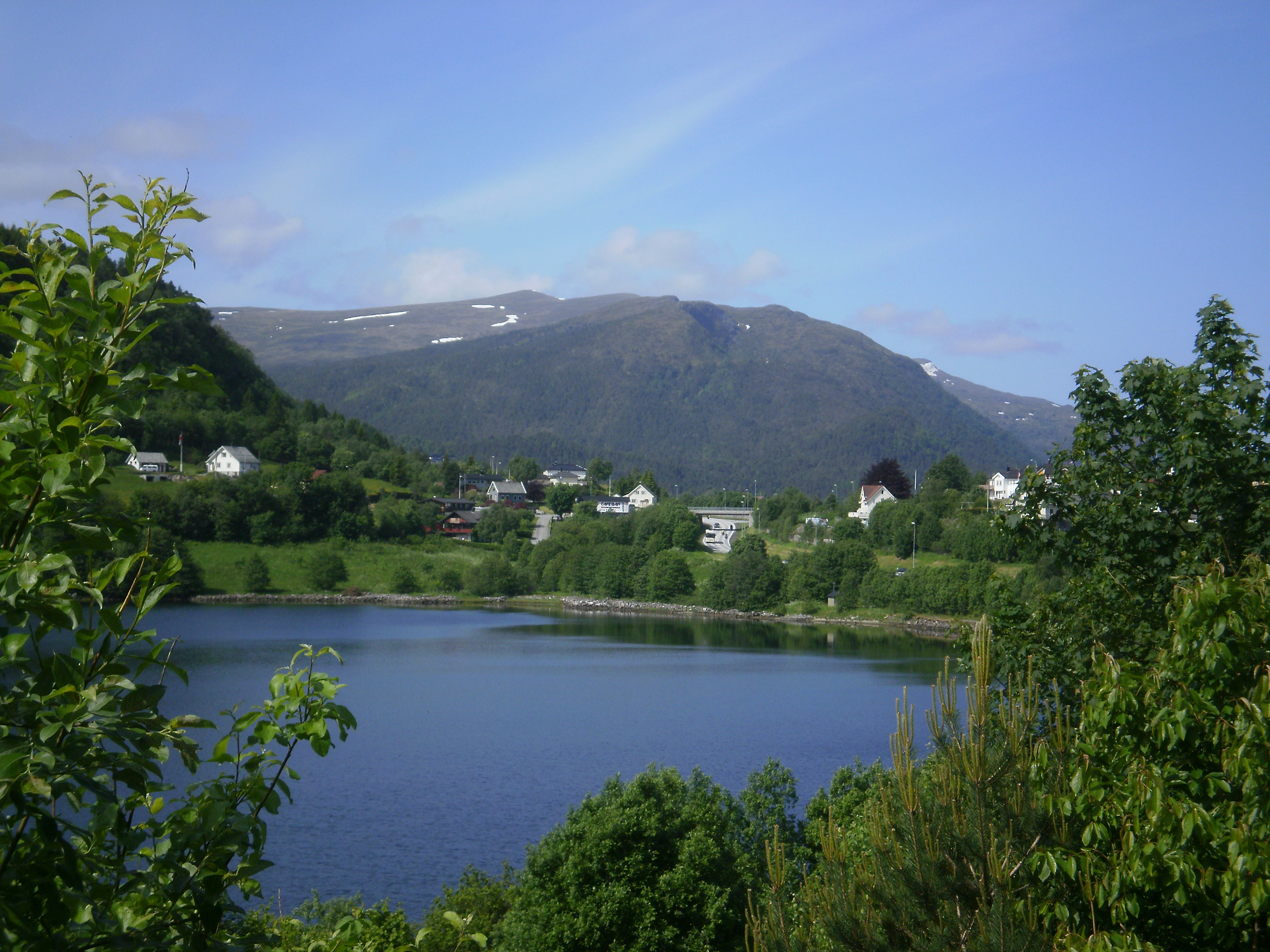

Highest point
- Elevation: 776 m (2,546 ft)
- Prominence: 776 m (2,546 ft)
- Isolation: 9.36 to 9.38 km (5.82 to 5.83 mi)
- Coordinates: 62°24′37″N 6°08′53″E

Geography
- Interactive map of the mountain
- Location: Møre og Romsdal, Norway

Tverrfjellet is a mountain in Sula Municipality in Møre og Romsdal county, Norway. The 776-metre (2,546 ft) tall mountain is the highest point in the municipality. It is located on the island of Sula, about 3.5 kilometres (2.2 mi) south of the village of Langevåg. The peak of the mountain is known as Vardane. The mountain dominates the southwestern side of the island, and because of that it is also nicknamed Sulafjellet (lit. 'Sula Mountain').

== See also ==
- List of mountains of Norway by height
