= Per Elvestuen =

Norwegian illustrator

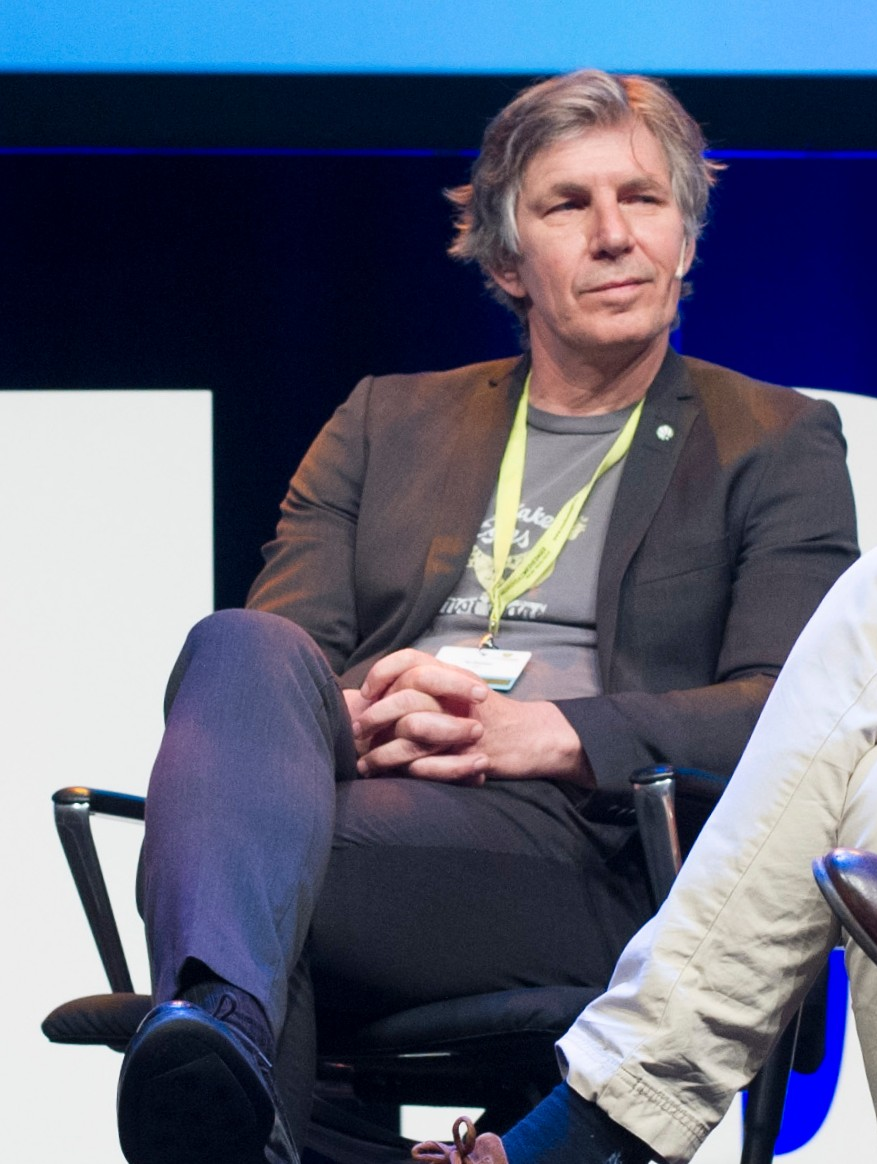
Per Elvestuen, 2015

Per Elvestuen (born 14 August 1962) is a Norwegian illustrator.

He was born in Gjøvik as a brother of Ola Elvestuen. He worked for the newspaper Dagens Næringsliv from 1988 to 2009, then for E24 Næringsliv. He is also a communications adviser for the company Aabø & Co. He published a children's book in 1995, and two collections of his editorial cartoons, in 1999 and 2004. He won the Editorial Cartoon of the Year award in 2003.

Awards
Preceded by Inge Grødum	Editorial Cartoon of the Year in Norway; 2003	Succeeded by Finn Graff (not awarded 2004)
