= Landro Church =

Church in Vestland, Norway

- Landro kyrkje
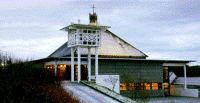
- View of the church
- Landro Church
- 60°25′06″N 4°58′20″E
- Location: Øygarden Municipality, Vestland
- Country: Norway
- Denomination: Church of Norway
- Churchmanship: Evangelical Lutheran

History
- Status: Parish church
- Founded: 1977
- Consecrated: 11 Dec 1977

Architecture
- Functional status: Active
- Architect: Aksel Fronth
- Architectural type: Rectangular
- Completed: 1977 (49 years ago)

Specifications
- Capacity: 400
- Materials: Concrete

Administration
- Diocese: Bjørgvin bispedømme
- Deanery: Vesthordland prosti
- Parish: Fjell
- Norwegian Cultural Heritage Site
- Type: Church
- Status: Not protected
- ID: 84890

Landro Church (Norwegian: Landro kyrkje) is a parish church of the Church of Norway in Øygarden Municipality in Vestland county, Norway. It is located in the village of Landro. It is one of the three churches for the Fjell parish which is part of the Vesthordland prosti (deanery) in the Diocese of Bjørgvin. The white, concrete church was built in a rectangular design in 1977 using plans drawn up by the architect Aksel Fronth. The church seats about 400 people.

== History ==
In 1906, the village of Landro got a small prayer house. In 1923, the prayer house was consecrated for church use as an annex chapel. In 1974, Aksel Fronth was hired by the parish in order to design a church in Landro that would replace the small chapel. Fronth designed a square building with a roof like a pyramid. The new church was consecrated on 11 December 1977.

== See also ==
- List of churches in Bjørgvin
