= Inger Giskeødegård =

Norwegian illustrator (born 1956)

Inger Karin Giskeødegård (born 28 June 1956) is a Norwegian illustrator.

She was born in Langevåg, and is an autodidact illustrator. She has worked for Sunnmørsposten since 1985, and has also illustrated in Bergens Tidende, Adresseavisen, Sogn Dagblad, Nytt i Uka, Vestlandsposten and Aftenposten. She won the Editorial Cartoon of the Year award in 2001. She has also illustrated books.

Awards
Preceded by Finn Graff	Editorial Cartoon of the Year in Norway; 2001	Succeeded by Inge Grødum
