= Robert Post (musician) =

Norwegian singer-songwriter (born 1979)

Robert Post (born Robert Øien Fylling; March 20, 1979 in Langevåg, Norway) is a Norwegian singer-songwriter. Post won two awards, Best Male Artist and Best Video, at Norway's equivalent of the Grammys, Spellemannprisen, in 2005 for his debut album. He has also toured with Aimee Mann, Rufus Wainwright, Ray Lamontagne, Texas, Natalie Imbruglia and Jason Mraz.

Post debuted with a worldwide release of his eponymous debut album in August 2005. Record producer Mike Hedges oversaw the album, and they recorded it through the original EMI mixing desk used for Pink Floyd's The Dark Side of the Moon. The album was "Record of the Week" on BBC Radio 2, while both singles, "Got None" and "There's One Thing", were A-listed. The album has sold 80,000 copies around the world.

He was on the bill at Robert Redford's 'Sundance Film Festival 2006' in Park City, sharing the stage with Rufus Wainwright, Imogen Heap and The Weepies. Post has performed on the biggest music shows and talk shows on television in Italy, France and the United Kingdom, such as Taratata, Top of the Pops, Pimp My TV and BBC Breakfast TV.

== Discography ==
=== Albums ===
- Robert Post (2005) Mercury Records, No. 12 Norwegian Album Chart
- Disarm & Let Go (2009) Bobfloat Music/Playground Music
- Live at Ocean Sound Recordings (2011) Bobfloat Music
- Rhetoric Season One (2011) Bobfloat Music/Musikkoperatørene
- The Button Moulder (2013) Bobfloat Music/Musikkoperatørene

=== EPs ===
- The Way We Are (2004) Bobfloat Music
- Martha's Drawings (2006) Bobfloat Music
- Ocean Sessions (2007) Bobfloat Music/Nettwerk Records

=== Singles ===
- Got None (2005) Mercury Records – No. 42 UK Singles Chart, No. 15 UK Airplay Chart, No. 1 Italy Airplay Chart, No. 29 Italy Singles Chart, No. 5 Norway Airplay Chart
- There's One Thing (2005) Mercury Records
- Try, Try, Try (2007) Bobfloat Music
- Beirut / The Boy with the Hood (2009) Bobfloat Music/Playground Music
- Landing / Frontline (2011) Bobfloat Music/Musikkoperatørene
- My Body (2013) Bobfloat Music/Musikkoperatørene
