= Olsvik Church =

Church in Vestland, Norway

- Olsvik kirke
- Olsvik Church
- 60°22′44″N 5°13′09″E
- Location: Bergen, Vestland
- Country: Norway
- Denomination: Church of Norway
- Churchmanship: Evangelical Lutheran

History
- Status: Parish church
- Founded: 1990
- Consecrated: 11 Nov 1990

Architecture
- Functional status: Active
- Architect: Aksel Fronth
- Architectural type: Rectangular
- Groundbreaking: 1989
- Completed: 1990 (36 years ago)

Specifications
- Capacity: 500
- Materials: Concrete

Administration
- Diocese: Bjørgvin bispedømme
- Deanery: Bergen domprosti
- Parish: Olsvik

Olsvik Church (Norwegian: Olsvik kirke) is a parish church of the Church of Norway in Bergen Municipality in Vestland county, Norway. It is located in the Olsvik neighborhood in the city of Bergen. It is the church for the Olsvik parish which is part of the Bergen domprosti (arch-deanery) in the Diocese of Bjørgvin. The white, concrete church was built in a rectangular design in 1990 using plans drawn up by the architect Aksel Fronth. The church seats about 500 people.

== History ==
In 1982, the new parish of Olsvik was separated from the Loddefjord parish. Planning for a new church began soon after. Aksel Fronth was hired to design the new building and land was acquired. The original plot of land that was chosen, however, was not able to be used after a court ruled that a church could not be built there. Then in 1986, a new plot of land was chosen. Construction began in 1989. The new church was designed so that the nave is on the main floor and the lower floor contains other rooms including meeting rooms, kitchens, and bathrooms. The church was consecrated on 11 November 1990.

== See also ==
- List of churches in Bjørgvin
