= Ålesund Region =

Region of Møre og Romsdal, Norway

The Ålesund Region (Norwegian: Ålesundregionen, Urban East Norwegian: [ˈôːɫəsʉnrɛɡɪˌuːnn̩]) is a metropolitan region in Møre og Romsdal county in western Norway. It consists of a number of municipalities that are centered around the city of Ålesund.

Municipality	Population	Area (km^{2})	Density (people/km^{2})
Ålesund Municipality	58,509	371.3	158
Sula Municipality	9,720	58.5	166
Giske Municipality	8,691	40.6	214
Haram Municipality	9,357	261.2	36
Sykkylven Municipality	7,617	337.8	23
Total	93,894	1069.4	88
