= Hild Sofie Tafjord =

Norwegian French horn player

- Born: 4 January 1974 (age 52); Langevåg, Møre og Romsdal, Norway
- Genres: Jazz, experimental, improv, electronica
- Occupations: Musician, composer, improviser
- Instrument: French horn
- Labels: Smalltown Supersound; Warner; Jester Records, plus3db records

Hild Sofie Tafjord (born 4 January 1974) is a Norwegian musician, horn player and composer active on the scenes of jazz, experimental music, noise, improvisation and live electronic music.

== Career ==
Born in Langevåg, Norway, Tafjord studied music at Toneheim folkehøgskole together with Maja Ratkje before continuing at the University of Oslo and the Norwegian Academy of Music. There, Tafjord and Ratkje joined cellist Lene Grenager and trumpeter Kristin Andersen to form Spunk, an ensemble that would leave a substantial mark on the Norwegian music scene.

Together with Ratkje, Tafjord also made out the duo Fe-mail (from 2000), and the trio Agrare (with the dancer Lotta Melin). Since 2006, she joined Grenager, flutist Bjørnar Habbestad and bassist Michael Duch to form Lemur, a quartet and composition collective. From 2009 she became a regular member of the Berlin-based ensemble Zeitkratzer. Tafjord has also performed in numerous configurations of Trondheim Jazz Orchestra.

Tafjords has been described as a sonic innovator on her instrument. Key works in her catalogue include her two solo albums KAMA and Breathing, as well as Mural I and Mural II, both large works for brass ensemble premiered at Tectonics festival in Glasgow in 2015 and Only Connect in Oslo in 2016.

== Discography ==
Tafjord appears on more than 130 albums.

=== Solo ===
- 2007: Kama (Pica Disk)
- 2014: Breathing (+3 dB) With Spunk:

=== With Spunk ===
- 2009: Det eneste jeg vet er at det ikke er en støvsuger (runegrammofon)
- 2001: Filtered through friends (runegrammofon)
- 2002: Den øverste toppen på en blåmalt flaggstang (runegrammofon)
- 2005: En aldeles forferdelig sykdom (runegrammofon)
- 2009: Kantarell (runegrammofon)
- 2013: Das Wohltemperierte Spunk (runegrammofon)
- 2014: Adventura botanica (runegrammofon)
- 2014: Spunk feat. Joelle Leandre. Live in Molde (plus3db records)
- 2016: Still eating gingerbread for breakfast (runegrammofon)

=== With Lemur ===
- 2008: IIIIIII (plus3db records)
- 2010: Aigean (plus3db records)
- 2016: Mikrophonie (plus3db records)
- 2016: Parish of Lemur (plus3db records)
- 2020: Lemur + Reimhold Friedl (sofa)
- 2022: Critical Bands (aurora records)

== Collaborations ==
Tafjord has collaborated with artists such as composer and multiinstrumentalist Zeena Parkins, guitarist Fred Frith, electronic musician Ikue Mori, the electronica-duo Matmos, saxophonist Mats Gustavsson, Wolf Eyes, saxophonist Evan Parker, vocalist Jaap Blonk, drummer Kjetil Manheim from Mayhem and poet/playwright Øyvind Berg. Her first solo album Kama was produced by noise artist and producer Lasse Marhaug, the second, Breath, by Bjørnar Habbestad, also from Lemur. In addition to a long ling of ad-hoc collaborations, she has performed with 'Crimetime Orchestra', 'No Spaghetti Edition' and 'Norwegian Noise Orchestra'.
