= Langevåg =

Village in Sula Municipality, Norway

Langevåg Langevågen
- Village
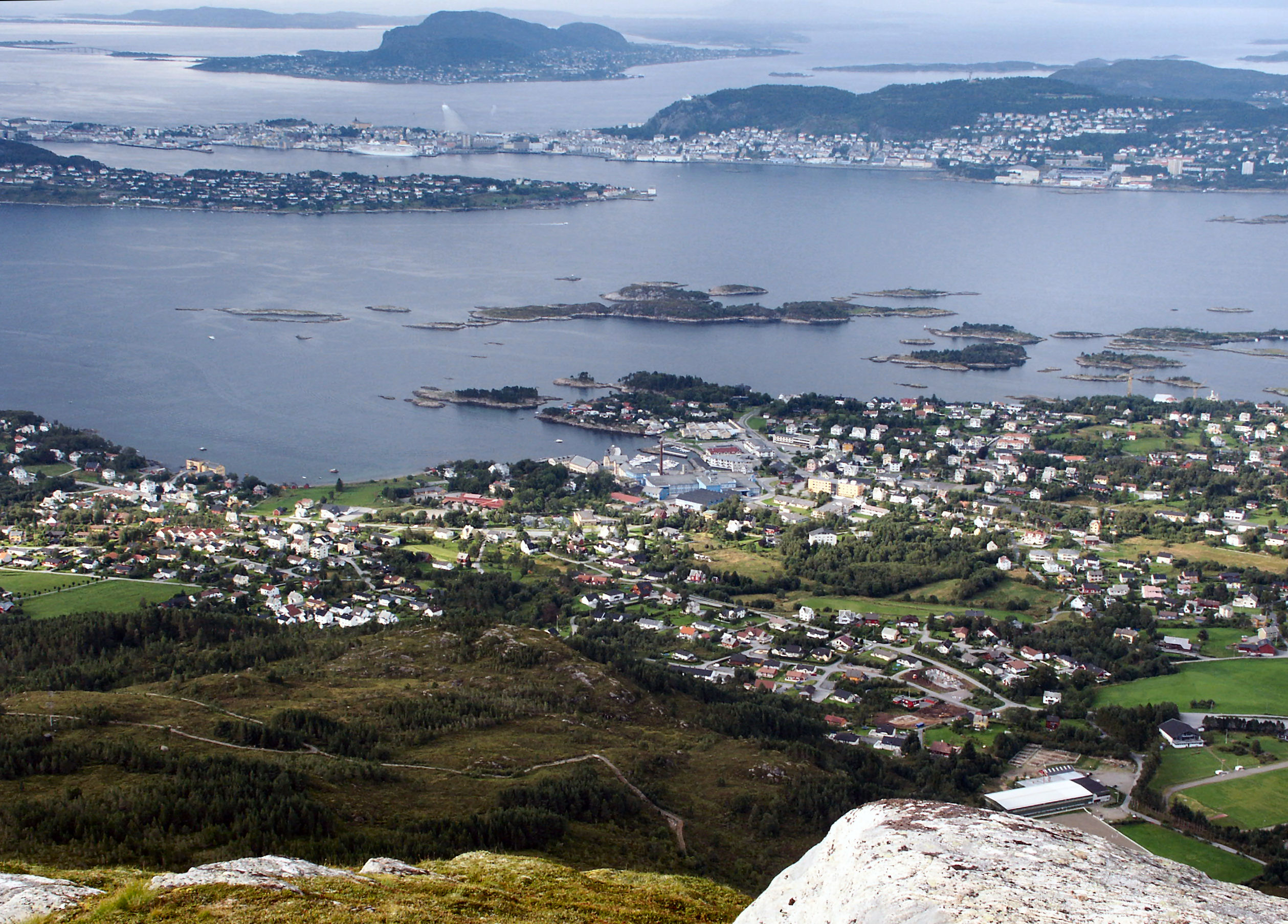
- View of Langevåg
- Interactive map of Langevåg
- Location within Møre og Romsdal Location within Norway
- Coordinates: 62.4408°N 6.1914°E
- Country: Norway
- Region: Western Norway
- County: Møre og Romsdal
- District: Sunnmøre
- Municipality: Sula Municipality
- Elevation: 4 m (13 ft)
- Time zone: UTC+01:00 (CET)
  - Summer (DST): UTC+02:00 (CEST)
- Post Code: 6030 Langevåg

Langevåg is the administrative center of Sula Municipality in Møre og Romsdal county, Norway. The village is situated at the end of the road on the north side of the island of Sula, about 7 kilometres (4.3 mi) northwest of the village of Mauseidvåg. The village lies across the Borgundfjorden from the city of Ålesund. There is a passenger ferry from Langevåg to Ålesund which takes approximately 7 minutes. Driving by car to the city is about a 25-minute drive on the nearby European route E39 highway, and the public bus may take up to 1 hour.

Langevåg is surrounded by mountains to the south, the tallest is the 776-metre (2,546 ft) tall Tverrfjellet. It is also surrounded by forests, lakes, and seashore. The city centre includes shops, a gas station, two schools, a medical centre, retirement homes, offices, service buildings, and Langevåg Church. The Devold factory is world-famous for its Devold blaatrøie and is still producing knitwear for its own brand, "Devold". The Devold factory has a museum, factory outlet store, guided tours, and a café. The newspaper Sulaposten is published in Langevåg.

The 7.5-square-kilometre (1,900-acre) village had a population (2000) of 6,355 and a population density of 847 inhabitants per square kilometre (2,190/sq mi). Since 2000, the population and area data for this village area has not been separately tracked by Statistics Norway because it has been considered part of the urban area of the nearby city of Ålesund.

== Attractions ==
Langevåg offers many recreational activities. There is a stable (with numerous horses and modern facilities), an arena (offering everything from disk golf to handball and association football), and a shooting range (offering indoor or outdoor facilities). There is also the Sula Sportsdykkerklubb which offers scuba diving and free diving in the fjord.

== Notable people ==
- Inger Giskeødegård, an illustrator
- Nils Petter Molvær, a musician
- Robert Post, a musician
