= Tecknaruppropet =

Swedish cartoonist and illustrator collective

- Formation: 26 March 2022; 4 years ago
- Type: Collective of professional cartoonists and illustrators
- Purpose: Opposition to nuclear weapons, Swedish NATO membership and the war in Gaza
- Location: Sweden
- Key people: Karin Z. Sunvisson (initiator)
- Award: Eldh-Ekblad Peace Prize (2024)
- Website: Catch 2022

Tecknaruppropet (The Illustrators' Appeal), originally launched as MOMENT 2022, is a Swedish collective of cartoonists and illustrators founded in March 2022 to defend Sweden's tradition of military non-alignment and to protest the government's refusal to sign the Treaty on the Prohibition of Nuclear Weapons. It began as an open petition started by the satirical cartoonist Karin Z. Sunvisson, who still leads it.

By 2024 the petition had more than 200 signatories, all from the Swedish illustration and political-cartooning professions. The collective has published an anthology with Galago (2022), founded the free satirical magazine LARM (2023), and published further anthologies in solidarity with Palestine. Its work has been exhibited in Stockholm, Gothenburg, Örebro and Norrköping.

In 2024 Tecknaruppropet received the Eldh-Ekblad Peace Prize from the Swedish Peace and Arbitration Society.

== Origins and the petition ==
After Russia's full-scale invasion of Ukraine in February 2022, the Swedish debate turned towards NATO membership, and the government declined to sign the Treaty on the Prohibition of Nuclear Weapons. In March 2022 Tecknaruppropet published its first drawing on Instagram under the title MOMENT 2022 – Nej till kärnvapen. Nej till NATO. The full petition was published in Aftonbladet on 21 April 2022, signed by 71 cartoonists. It opens:

Våld föder våld. (Violence begets violence.)

The petition argues that joining NATO would end Sweden's two centuries of non-alignment and weaken its ability to mediate in international conflicts, and that security cannot be built on nuclear deterrence. It calls on Sweden to reject NATO membership and to sign the UN treaty banning nuclear weapons. The list of signatories grew to more than 130 by August 2022 and passed 200 by 2024. Signatories include satirists and children's-book illustrators such as Sven Nordqvist, Jan Lööf, Cecilia Torudd, Sara Granér, Jakob Wegelius, Anna-Clara Tidholm, Lasse Åberg, Max Andersson, Martin Ander, Ulf Lundkvist, Ulf Frödin, Robert Nyberg and Christer Themptander.

== Publications ==
Cover of Tecknaruppropet mot kärnvapen och Nato (2022). Ill: Michaela Larsson

Contributors work without pay, and proceeds are donated to peace and solidarity organizations.

- Tecknaruppropet mot kärnvapen och Nato (The Cartoonists' Petition against Nuclear Weapons and NATO; Galago, August 2022). A 135-page anthology of drawings by some 94 cartoonists, edited and designed by Karin Z. Sunvisson, with an afterword by Andreas Berg, professor of illustration, on illustrators' involvement in peace movements. The first printing sold out, and the book is held by 72 Swedish libraries.
- LARM ("alarm" or "din"; July 2023–), a free satirical magazine. The first issue was distributed in nearly 20,000 copies as an insert in Pax, the membership magazine of the Swedish Peace and Arbitration Society, and was timed to coincide with the 2023 Vilnius summit, at which Turkey lifted its objection to Sweden's accession to NATO. The title was borrowed from the French satirical journal Le Charivari, whose name refers to a noisy popular protest. Later issues have covered subsequent stages of Sweden's NATO accession.
- Bildbank för Palestina (Image Bank for Palestine; November 2023), an open-access online archive of drawings for use on placards and posters at demonstrations in solidarity with Palestine.
- Palestinaboken – Tecknare i solidaritet (The Palestine Book – Cartoonists in Solidarity; November 2024; second edition March 2025). An anthology of 140 drawings by 140 cartoonists, with a foreword by the Palestinian cartoonist Mohammad Saba'aneh. The full sale price goes to the Swedish solidarity organization Palestinagrupperna i Sverige ("the Palestine Groups in Sweden") and to the United Nations Relief and Works Agency for Palestine Refugees (UNRWA).
- Kampen fortsätter. Befria Palestina! (The Struggle Continues. Free Palestine!; 2025), a further anthology on Palestine and Gaza.

== Exhibitions ==
- Släpp freden fri! (Set peace free!), book-launch exhibition at the Mint gallery, ABF-huset, Stockholm (September 2022).
- Touring exhibitions at Frölunda Kulturhus in Gothenburg and at venues in Örebro and Kumla (2022–23).
- En tiger tiger inte (A tiger does not stay silent), Arbetarrörelsens arkiv och bibliotek (the Swedish Labour Movement's Archives and Library), Stockholm (12 December 2023 – 29 February 2024).
- Nato på allas läppar – Tecknaruppropet i retrospektiv (NATO on everyone's lips: Tecknaruppropet in retrospect), Museum of Work, Norrköping (31 August 2024 – 9 February 2025), a retrospective drawn from the collective's image archive.

== Awards ==
On 18 May 2024 Tecknaruppropet received the Eldh-Ekblads fredspris at the Swedish Peace and Arbitration Society's 141st congress in Örebro. (Note: The Society's prize roll lists the 2024 laureate as Tecknaruppropet mot Nato och Kärnvapen, a name close to the title of the collective's 2022 anthology, Tecknaruppropet mot kärnvapen och Nato. The prize went to the collective as a whole, not to the book.) Later that year, Tecknaruppropet received an honorable mention EWK Prize (named for the artist Ewert Karlsson) with the following citation:

The EWK Award Jury, the EWK Society, the Museum of Work, and Fullersta Gård, together with Margareta van den Bosch, daughter of EWK, want to call attention to The Illustrators’ Appeal as being the most important event in the world of Swedish satire in several decades.

== See also ==
- Swedish Peace and Arbitration Society
- Treaty on the Prohibition of Nuclear Weapons
- Political cartoon

== Sources ==
- "Svenska tecknare ritar mot kärnvapen och Nato". Kultur. Aftonbladet (in Swedish). 21 April 2022.
- "Ny utskällning från Tecknarupproret – EN TIGER TIGER INTE" (in Swedish). Arbetarrörelsens arkiv och bibliotek. 12 December 2023.
- "Nato på allas läppar – Tecknaruppropet i retrospektiv" (in Swedish). Arbetets museum.
- "Mohammad Sabaaneh tilldelas EWK-priset i sin frånvaro – hedersomnämnande till Tecknaruppropet" (Press release) (in Swedish). Arbetets museum. 29 October 2024.
- "Tecknaruppropet mot kärnvapen och Nato" (in Swedish). Boktugg.
- "EWK-priset" (in Swedish). EWK-sällskapet.
- "Tecknaruppropet mot kärnvapen och Nato" (in Swedish). Galago.
- "Tecknaruppropet: Släpp freden fri! Nej till kärnvapen! Nej till NATO!" (in Swedish). Global Politics. 1 September 2022.
- "Tecknaruppropet mot kärnvapen och Nato" (in Swedish). Libris, Kungliga biblioteket.
- Mårtensson, Ronja (7 March 2024). "Satirtidningen Larm: Vi kommer aldrig godta Natomedlemskapet". TV4 Nyheterna (in Swedish).
- "Nato på allas läppar – Tecknaruppropet ger perspektiv på militäralliansen". SVT Nyheter (in Swedish). 1 September 2024.
- Årsberättelse 2022 (PDF) (Report) (in Swedish). Svenska Freds- och Skiljedomsföreningen. June 2023.
- Kongresshandlingar 2024 – Svenska Freds 141-årskongress, 18–19 maj 2024 i Örebro (PDF) (Report) (in Swedish). Svenska Freds- och Skiljedomsföreningen. April 2024.
- Lokala årsböcker 2023: Svenska Freds Örebro län (PDF) (Report) (in Swedish). Svenska Freds- och Skiljedomsföreningen. March 2024.
- Lokala årsböcker 2023: Svenska Freds Göteborg (PDF) (Report) (in Swedish). Svenska Freds- och Skiljedomsföreningen. March 2024.
- "Tecknaruppropet – LARM" (in Swedish). Svenska Freds- och Skiljedomsföreningen.
- "Eldh-Ekblads fredspris" (in Swedish). Svenska Freds- och Skiljedomsföreningen. "2024 – Tecknaruppropet mot Nato och Kärnvapen"
- "Tecknaruppropet" (in Swedish). Tecknaruppropet.
