= EWK Prize =

Swedish art and illustration award in honor of Ewert Karlsson

- The EWK plaque, designed by sculptor Thomas Qvarsebo, awarded as part of the EWK Prize
- Native name: EWK-priset
- Awarded for: Artistic work in the spirit of political cartoonist Ewert Karlsson
- Description: Swedish art and illustration prize
- Sponsored by: EWK-sällskapet
- Country: Sweden
- Established: 2000
- Website: ewk.se/ewk-priset/

The EWK Prize (EWK-priset) is a Swedish award presented annually to artists and illustrators whose work continues the tradition of political cartoonist Ewert Karlsson (EWK).

== Background ==
=== Ewert Karlsson (EWK) ===
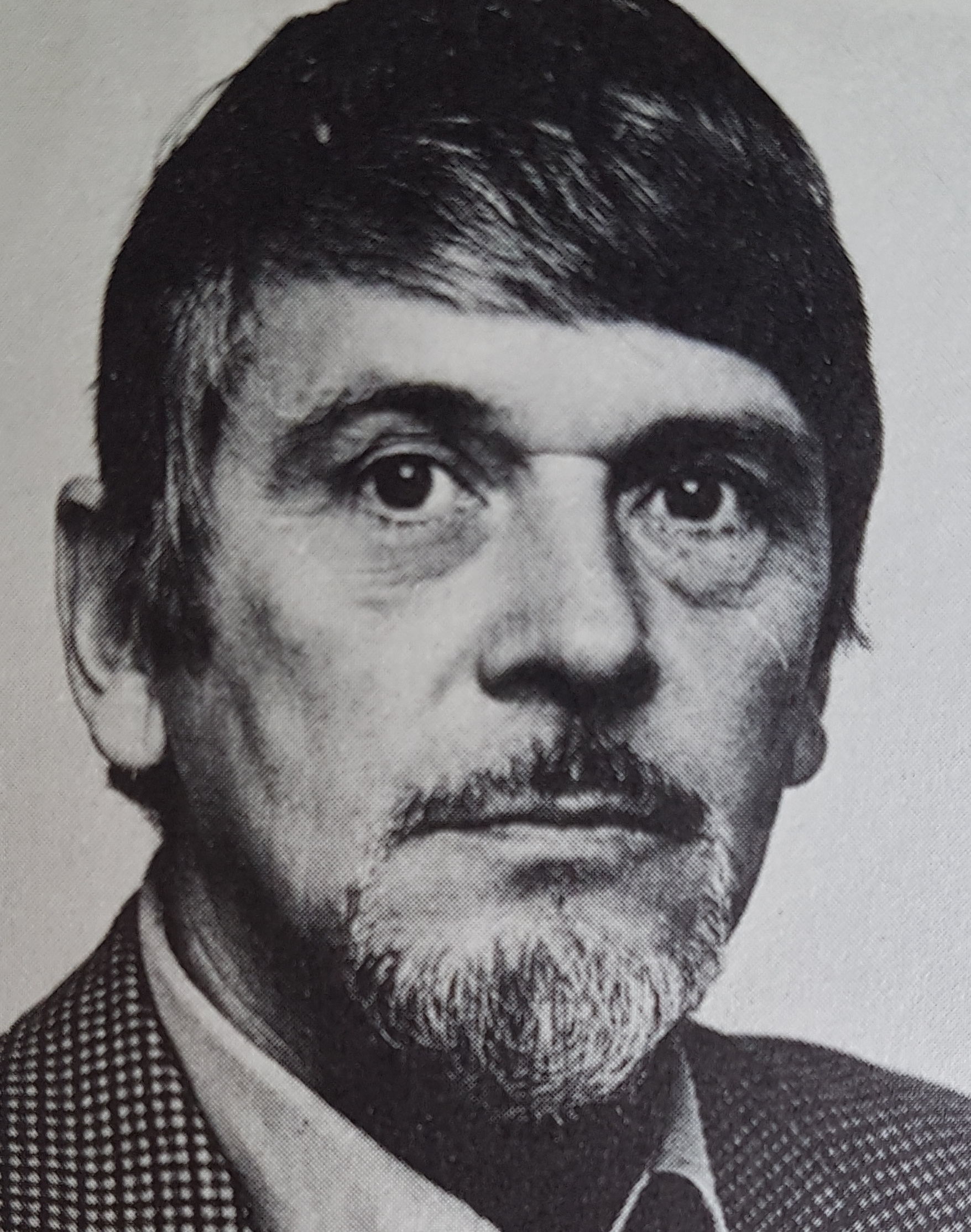
Ewert Karlsson (1918–2004), Swedish political cartoonist known as EWK

Ewert Gustav Adolf Karlsson (1918–2004), known by the signature EWK, was born in Mogata parish in Östergötland and became one of Sweden's most internationally recognized political cartoonists. His political drawings frequently appeared in Aftonbladet and Land, and his ability to depict political and social issues with clarity and emotional force earned him international acclaim. A selection of his works has been exhibited widely in Sweden and abroad.

=== EWK Society ===
The EWK Society (EWK-sällskapet) was founded in 1993 with the goal of establishing an EWK museum in Söderköping, near Karlsson's birthplace; a permanent gallery of his work ultimately opened at the Museum of Work in Norrköping in 2009. The society works to promote knowledge of EWK's work and encourage political illustration art.

=== The prize ===
In 2000, the society established the prize as a way to recognize and encourage artists working in the spirit of Ewert Karlsson. Winners are selected by a jury composed of active political cartoonists and representatives from the Museum of Work and Fullersta gård, a historic manor house and municipal art center in Huddinge, Sweden, where Karlsson lived for many years. In addition to the monetary award of 10,000 SEK, recipients receive an EWK plaque designed by sculptor Thomas Qvarsebo.

== Recipients ==
Year	Recipient	Country
2000	Riber Hansson	Sweden
2001	Finn Graff	Norway
2002	Janusz "Mayk" Majewski	Poland
2003	Leif Zetterling	Sweden
2005	Siri Dokken	Norway
2008	Ulf Frödin	Sweden
2010	Sara Granér	Sweden
2011	Robert Nyberg	Sweden
2012	Magnus Bard	Sweden
2013	Liv Strömquist	Sweden
2014	Lars-Erik "Lehån" Håkansson	Sweden
2015	Saad Hajo	Sweden
2016	Zapiro	South Africa
2017	Charlie Christensen	Sweden
2018	Max Gustafson	Sweden
2019	Karin Z. Sunvisson	Sweden
2020	Doaa el-Adl	Egypt
2021	Ann Telnaes	United States
2022	Julie Leonardsson	Sweden
2023	Ulf Lundkvist	Sweden
2024	Mohammad Sabaaneh	Palestine
2025	Pontus Lundkvist	Sweden

== 25th anniversary ==
In 2025 the EWK Society celebrated the 25th anniversary of the prize with a commemorative publication featuring contributions from all recipients. In 2025–2026, exhibitions featuring earlier laureates such as Robert Nyberg were held in Stockholm, and Museum of Work announced updates to the permanent EWK gallery.

== Bibliography ==
- "Med satiren som livsstil" (in Swedish). Dagens Arbete. 4 November 2019.
- "Mot årets EWK-pristagare" (in Swedish). Arbetets museum. 27 October 2020.
- "Ann Telnaes är årets EWK-pristagare" (in Swedish). Dagens Arbete. 9 November 2021.
- "Udden sitter i detaljerna" (in Swedish). Dagens Arbete. 13 October 2022.
- "EWK-priset". EWK-sällskapet (in Swedish). EWK-sällskapet.
- "EWK-priset". Arbetets museum (in Swedish). Arbetets museum. 2025.
- "Om EWK". EWK-sällskapet (in Swedish). EWK-sällskapet.
- "Nyheter". EWK-sällskapet (in Swedish). EWK-sällskapet.
- "EWK-sällskapet". EWK-sällskapet (in Swedish). EWK-sällskapet.
