= EWK =

EWK may refer to:

- Ewert Karlsson (1918–2004), Swedish political cartoonist
- Eberhard W. Kornfeld (born 1923), Swiss auctioneer, gallerist, author, art dealer and collector in Berne
- Newton City/County Airport, in Kansas, United States
- Ex-works
