= Karin Z. Sunvisson =

Swedish satirical cartoonist (born 1981)

- Born: Karin Zarić Sunvisson; 1981 (age 44–45); Haninge, Stockholm County, Sweden
- Education: École nationale supérieure des arts décoratifs
- Known for: Satirical illustration; political cartoons
- Movement: Tecknaruppropet
- Awards: EWK Prize (2019); Dynamostipendiet (2024)

Karin Z. Sunvisson (full name Karin Zarić Sunvisson; born 1981) is a Swedish satirical cartoonist, illustrator, graphic designer and printmaker. She is the initiator of Tecknaruppropet, a network of Swedish cartoonists opposing Sweden's accession to NATO and the adoption of nuclear weapons in Swedish defense policy, and since 2021 has led the Network for women graphic artists, a project promoting women in political satire. In 2019 she received the EWK Prize for political satire, and in 2024 she was awarded the Dynamostipendiet (Dynamo Grant) by the Swedish Arts Grants Committee.

== Biography ==
Sunvisson grew up in Haninge, a suburb of Stockholm. After upper-secondary studies she moved to Paris, where she studied at the École nationale supérieure des arts décoratifs (ENSAD) and obtained a master's degree in visual arts. She is based in Sweden and Serbia.

== Work and themes ==
Sunvisson works across illustration, political cartooning, graphic design and printmaking, with a primary focus on editorial illustration and satirical drawing. She has described her satirical work as belonging to the Juvenalian tradition, combining detailed realist draftsmanship with symbolic and dystopian imagery. Recurring themes in her work include militarization, war and freedom of expression. In a 2019 interview she distinguished indiscriminate satire from politically conscious satire that "takes aim carefully," arguing that only the latter can function as a counter-power.

She has contributed illustrations to Swedish and international periodicals, among them Arena, Baltic Worlds, De Morgen, Folket i Bild/Kulturfront and Tecknaren, and has produced commissioned work for public institutions including the Swedish Arts Grants Committee, the Swedish Institute and the Musée de la Chasse et de la Nature in Paris. She is one of five Swedish cartoonists featured in the Swedish Institute's touring exhibition Facing the Climate, which combines Swedish and local cartoonists' responses to climate change and has been shown in more than 35 countries. Her work has also been shown at the United Nations Headquarters in New York, at the Royal Library "Black Diamond" in Copenhagen, at the EWK Center for Political Cartoons in Norrköping, at the House of Sweden in Washington, D.C., and at national institutions including the National Library of Vietnam in Hanoi and the National Historical Museum in Tirana.

Sunvisson has taught and lectured on satire and visual journalism at art schools and cultural institutions including Konstfack, HDK-Valand, the Belarusian State Academy of Arts in Minsk, the Art Academy of Latvia in Riga and the National Faculty of Fine Arts in Skopje. Between 2016 and 2019 she lectured at Konstfack in Stockholm on the historical context and aftermath of the Charlie Hebdo shooting.

== Network for women graphic artists ==
Sunvisson has been a sustained public advocate for greater representation of women in editorial and satirical cartooning, arguing that the small share of published satire produced by women is inconsistent with the genre's status as a measure of free expression.

Since 2021 she has been project leader of the Network for women graphic artists – graphic political satire and creative processes, a collaboration between Arbetets museum and the Swedish Institute aimed at countering isolation among women cartoonists and encouraging publishers to commission their work. She co-curated the related Arbetets museum exhibition Med pennan genom glastaket (English title: With the Pen through the Glass Ceiling) with art historian Carina Milde; the show presented the finalist works from the inaugural Women Cartoonists International Award, which drew over a thousand entries from some 260 women worldwide.

== Tecknaruppropet ==
In April 2022, in the weeks following the Russian invasion of Ukraine and as Swedish public debate shifted toward NATO membership, Sunvisson initiated Tecknaruppropet MOMENT 2022, a collective appeal by Swedish cartoonists calling for the preservation of Sweden's policy of military non-alignment and opposing the adoption of nuclear weapons. Sunvisson described the initiative as a response to the way fear and grief over the war in Ukraine were being used to build support for NATO membership, saying she wanted, "in the old cartoonists' tradition," to mobilize colleagues in defense of the peace movement.

The petition was published in Aftonbladet on 21 April 2022 with 71 artists' signatories, and the list grew quickly — passing 130 by August 2022 and over 200 by 2024 — including Jan Lööf, Sven Nordqvist, Carl Johan De Geer, Lasse Åberg, Sara Granér, Eva Lindström and Robert Nyberg.

In August 2022 Sunvisson edited and designed the collective's anthology Tecknaruppropet mot kärnvapen och Nato, published by Galago, a 135-page selection of work by some 94 contributing cartoonists. The collective has since produced exhibitions, public interventions, the satirical newspaper LARM (launched 2023), and further anthologies in solidarity with Palestine.

== Awards and recognition ==
Awards received by Sunvisson:

- EWK Prize (2019), awarded by the EWK Society at Arbetets museum for contributions to political satire. The jury cited her "deep understanding of the power of images" and described her as "an ambassador for the vital visual journalism" that EWK once represented.
- Dynamostipendiet (2024), awarded by the Swedish Arts Grants Committee's Visual Arts Fund, with a motivation citing her initiation of Tecknaruppropet and her leadership of the Network for women graphic artists.

In 2024 the Tecknaruppropet collective she founded was separately awarded the Eldh-Ekblad Peace Prize by the Swedish Peace and Arbitration Society and received an honorary mention from the EWK Prize for its contributions to public debate on peace and demilitarization.

== Sources ==
- Sunvisson, Karin Z. (n.d.). "About". Karin Z. Sunvisson (archived). Archived from the original on 19 January 2026.
- "Karin Z Sunvisson" (in Swedish). Illustratörcentrum. n.d.
- "Med satiren som livsstil". Dagens Arbete (in Swedish). 4 November 2019.
- Mellberg, Mårten (2019). "EWK-priset 2019" (in Swedish). Arbetets museum. Archived from the original on 9 June 2022.
- "Skapa debatt, inte hat". Tecknaren (in Swedish). Svenska Tecknare. 10 April 2015.
- "Svenska tecknare ritar mot kärnvapen och Nato". Aftonbladet (in Swedish). 21 April 2022.
- "Streker opp Nato-motstand". Klassekampen (in Norwegian Bokmål). 29 April 2022.
- Copcutt, Julius (June 2022). "Tecknare i upprop mot Nato och kärnvapen" (PDF). Fredsnytt (in Swedish). No. 1. Kristna Fredsrörelsen. pp. 12–13.
- "Med pennan genom glastaket" (in Swedish). Arbetets museum. 2022. Archived from the original on 2 July 2022.
- "Her Rights! Money, Power, Autonomy". House of Sweden. Embassy of Sweden, Washington, D.C. 2022. Archived from the original on 11 August 2022.
- "Facing the Climate" (in Swedish). Swedish Institute. n.d.
- Sunvisson, Karin Z. (9 September 2021). "Satire – a paper tiger?". Nordic Culture Point.
- "Nato gör satiren vassare". SVT Kultur (in Swedish). 12 July 2023.
- "Tecknaruppropet". Tecknaruppropet (in Swedish). 2024.
- "A colpi di satira contro la NATO". Il Manifesto (in Italian). 19 January 2025.
- "Nato på allas läppar – Tecknaruppropet i retrospektiv" (in Swedish). Arbetets museum. 2024.
- Pető, Andrea (2022). ""Better Stories" in Higher Education". Central European University.
- Kongresshandlingar 2024 (PDF) (Report) (in Swedish). Svenska Freds- och Skiljedomsföreningen. 18–19 May 2024.
- "Dynamostipendiet 2024 till Nina Beckmann och Karin Z. Sunvisson" (in Swedish). Konstnärsnämnden. 19 March 2024.
- "Tecknaruppropet mot kärnvapen och Nato" (in Swedish). Galago. n.d.
- "Tecknaruppropet mot kärnvapen och Nato" (in Swedish). Boktugg. n.d.
- "Mohammad Sabaaneh tilldelas EWK-priset i sin frånvaro – hedersomnämnande till Tecknaruppropet" (Press release) (in Swedish). Arbetets museum. 29 October 2024.

== See also ==
- Tecknaruppropet
- Editorial cartooning
- Political satire
