= Takbir =

Arabic phrase

- Arabic: تَكْبِير
- Romanization: takbīr
- IPA: Arabic pronunciation: [tak.biːr]
- Literal meaning: "magnification [of God]"

- Allahu Akbar
- Arabic: اللّٰهُ أَكْبَر
- Romanization: Allāhu ʾAkbar
- IPA: [ʔaɫ.ɫaː.hu ʔak.bar]
- Literal meaning: "God is greater [than everything]"

The takbīr (Arabic: تَكْبِير [tak.biːr], lit. 'magnification [of God]') is an Islamic expression consisting of the Arabic phrase Allāhu ʾAkbar (Arabic: اللّٰهُ أَكْبَر [ʔaɫ.ɫaː.hu ʔak.bar], lit. 'God is the greatest [of everything]'), conventionally translated as "God is the greatest" or "God is great", and literally meaning "God is greater". It is a fundamental and repeatedly used proclamation of the absolute supremacy of Allah.

The term takbīr is the Arabic verbal noun derived from the reflexive verb kabbara, meaning "to magnify" or "to acknowledge or confess the greatness of". In technical religious usage it denotes the recitation of Allāhu ʾAkbar in Muslim worship and devotion. The expression is used in formal salah (prayer), in the ādhān or call to prayer, during the Hajj, in personal devotion and informal professions of faith, and in circumstances of distress or joy, as well as to express determination or defiance. It is also used by Orthodox Arab Christians as an expression of faith. The phrase is furthermore the official motto of Iran and Iraq.

The expression is connected with the wording of 17:111, kabbirhu takbīran, rendered as "make him (God) greatly great". In this usage, "magnifying" God does not imply increasing God's greatness, but acknowledging it. In this sense it can be compared with the Christian Magnificat, in which "magnifying" similarly denotes recognition of divine greatness.

== Etymology ==
takbīr in nastaʿlīq

The Takbir written in Thuluth script

Takbir in Naskh script

The Arabic word كَبِير (kabīr) means big from the Semitic root k-b-r. A cognate word for this root exists in Hebrew as כביר (kabir). The Arabic word أَكْبَر (ʾakbar) is the elative form ("bigger, biggest") of the adjective kabīr ("big"). When used in the takbīr it is usually translated as "biggest", but some authors translate it as "bigger". The term takbīr itself is the stem II verbal noun of the root k-b-r, meaning "big", from which akbar "bigger" is derived. The form Allāhu is a nominative of Allah, meaning "God".

The takbīr is sometimes translated into English as "God is greater", which is short for "God is greater than all" (الله أَكْبَرُ من كلِّ شيء). It is an example of an Arabic idiom where an incomplete sentence, abbreviated because of its familiarity, is considered grammatically correct.

== Usage in Islamic rituals ==
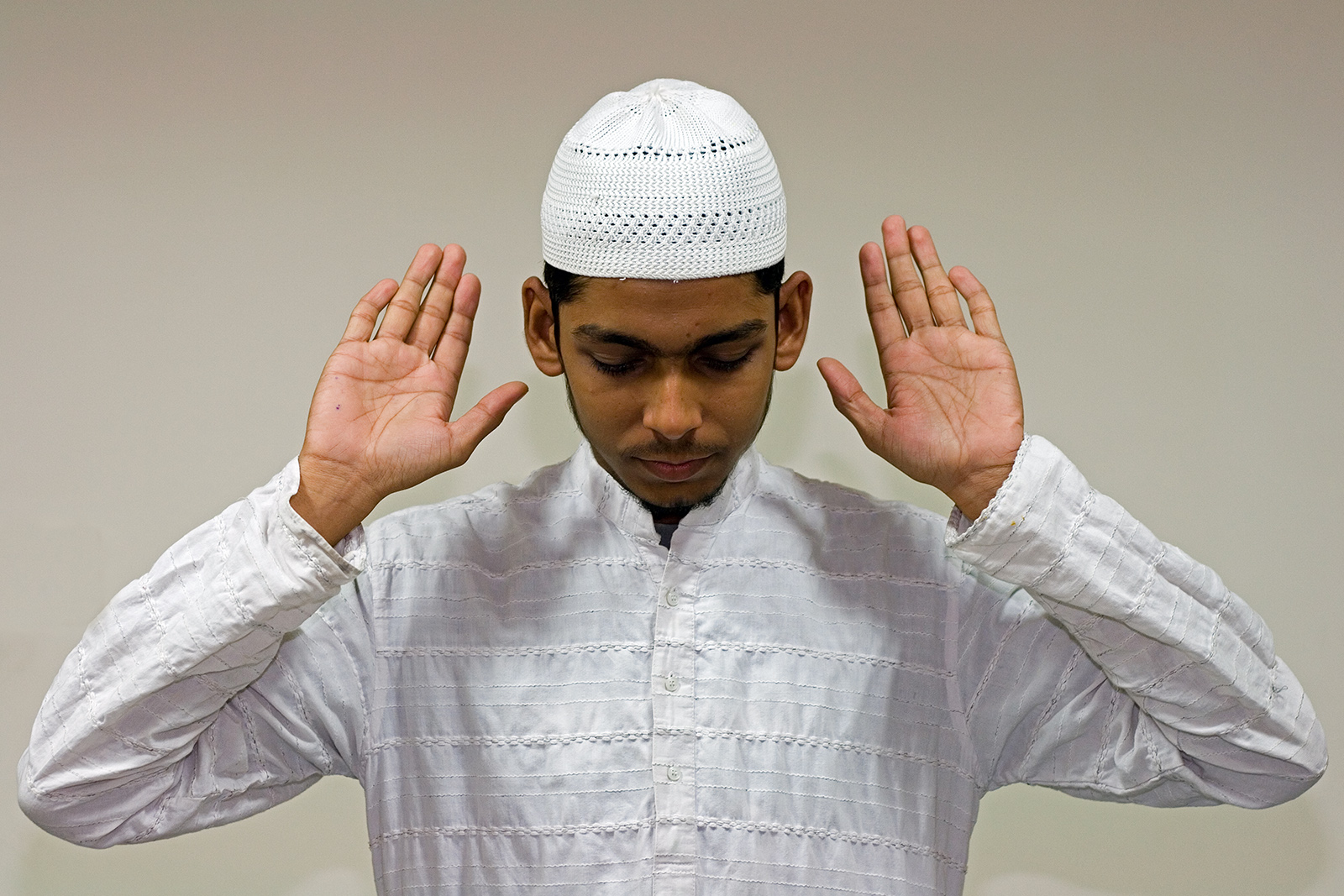
A Muslim raises both of his hands to recite the takbīr in prayer.

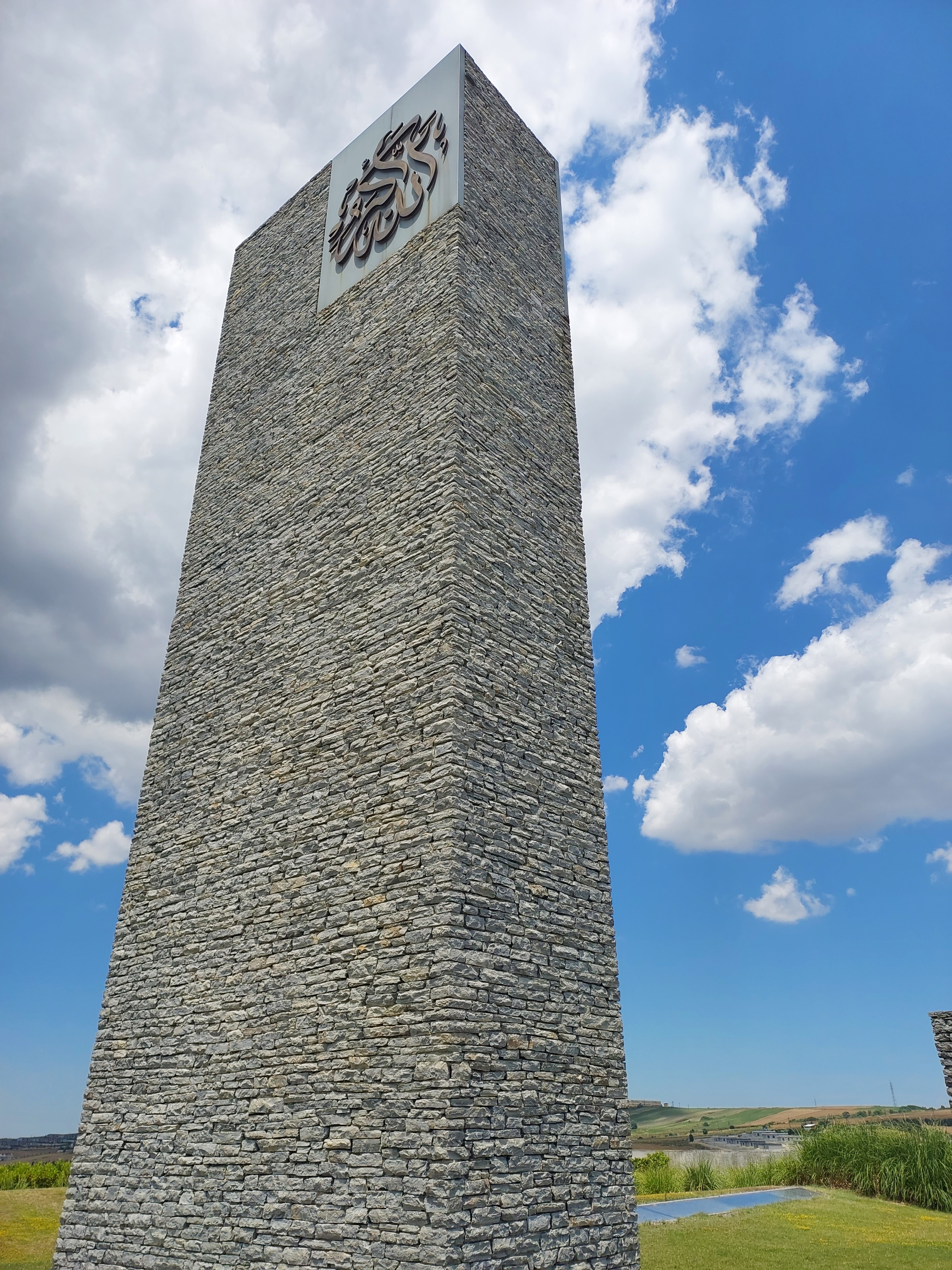
Calligraphic Takbir in minaret of Sancaklar Mosque

This phrase is recited by Muslims in many different situations.

=== In prayer ===
The phrase is said during each stage of both salah (obligatory prayers, performed five times a day), and nafl (supererogatory prayers, performed at will). The call to prayer by the muezzin to those outside the mosque (adhan) and the call to those inside to line up for the commencement of prayer (iqama) also contain the phrase.

While there are many short prayers like it, the takbīr is used more frequently than any other.

=== Following births and deaths ===
The phrase is used after the birth of a child as a means of praising God. It is also part of Islamic funeral and burial customs.

=== During the Eid Festival and the Hajj ===
During the festival of Eid al-Fitr and Eid al-Adha, and also the days preceding it, Muslims recite the takbīr. This is particularly the case on the Day of Arafah.

=== During the halal slaughter of animals ===
In the process of pronouncing the name of God while performing Dhabihah one must say Bismillah Allahu Akbar.

== Other social usage ==
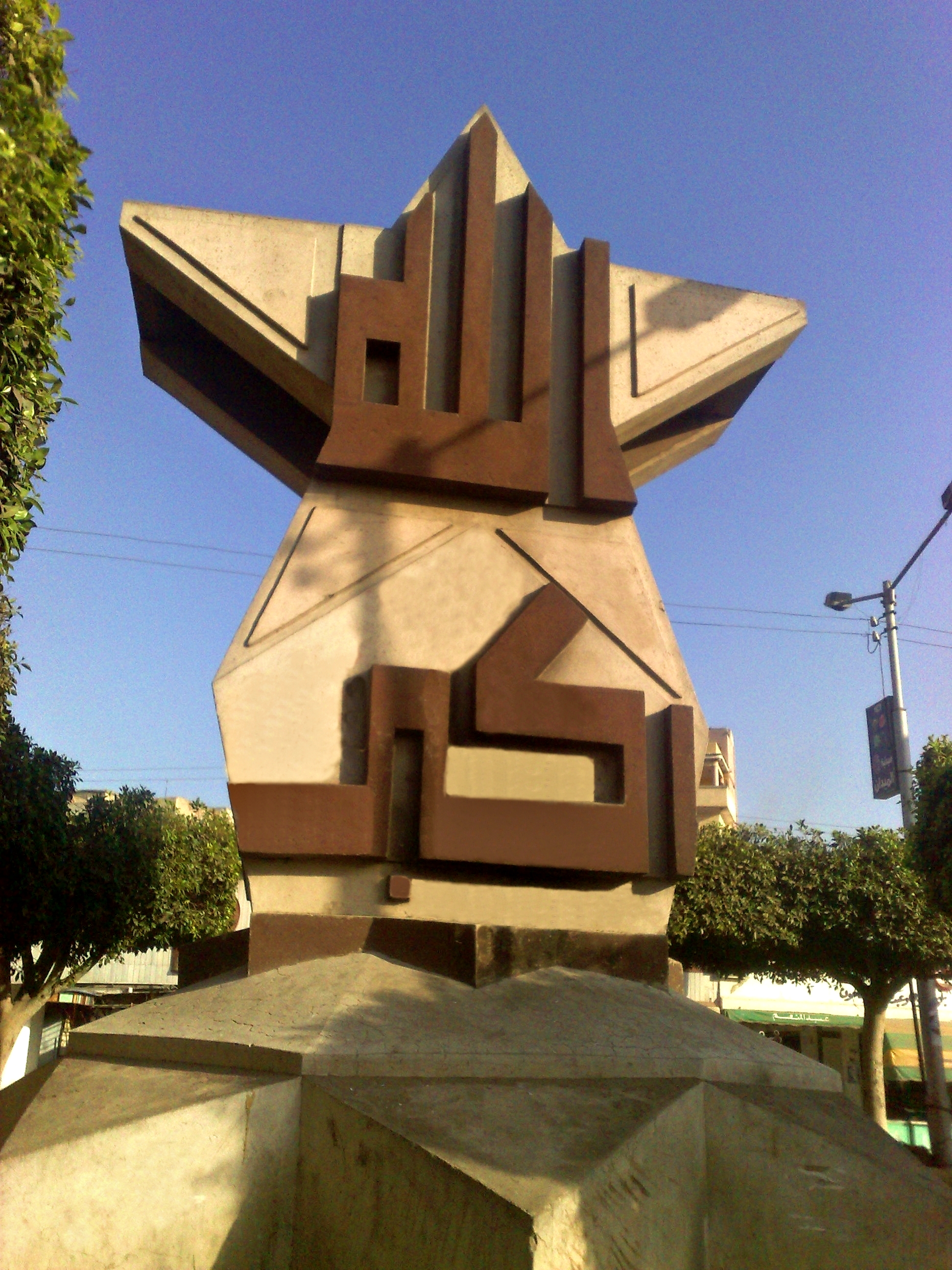
Allāhu akbar in a memorial, Desouk, Egypt

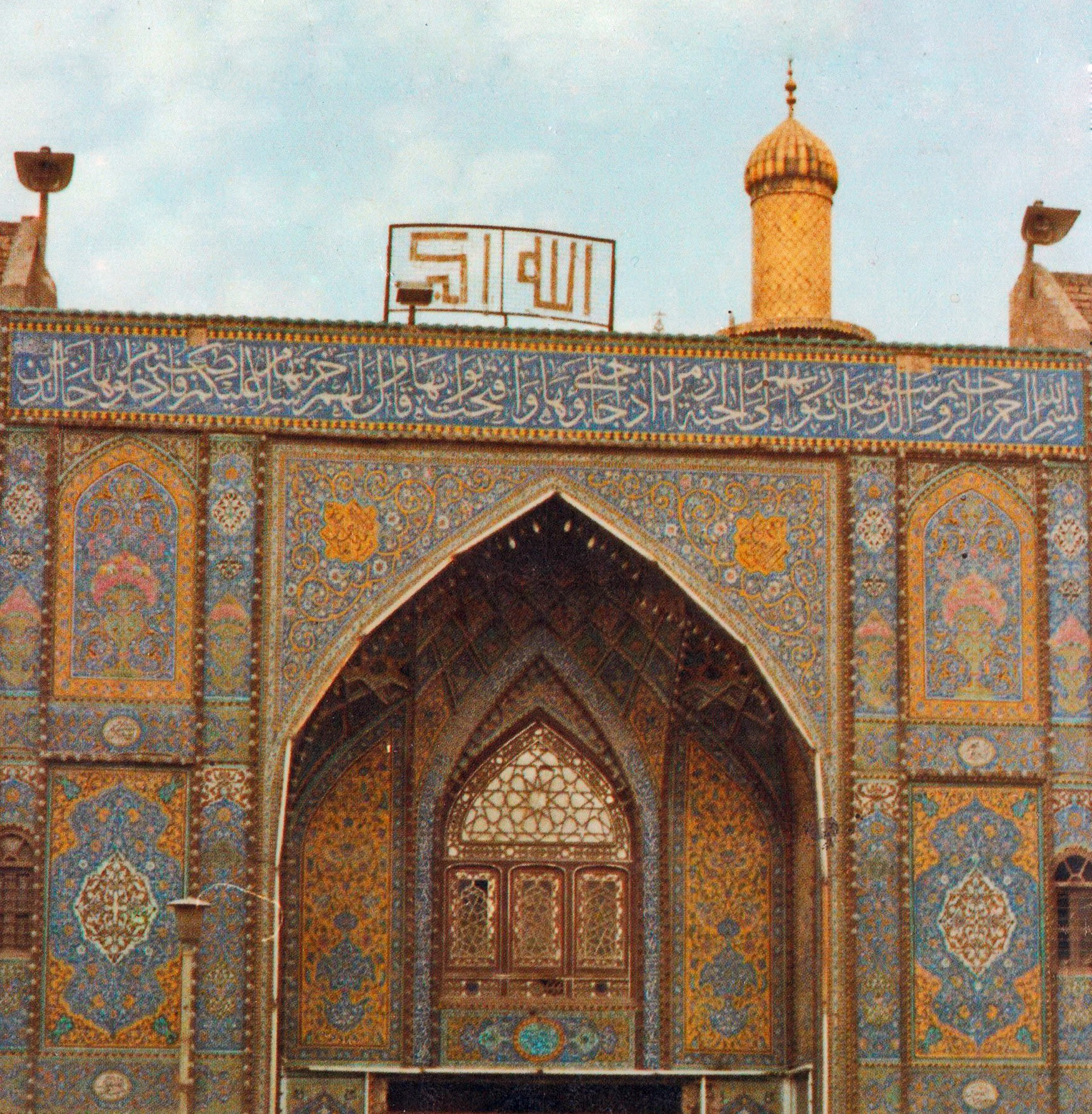
Allāhu akbar in Arabic calligraphy seen on Imam Ali Mosque architecture (center of the Iwan), 1994

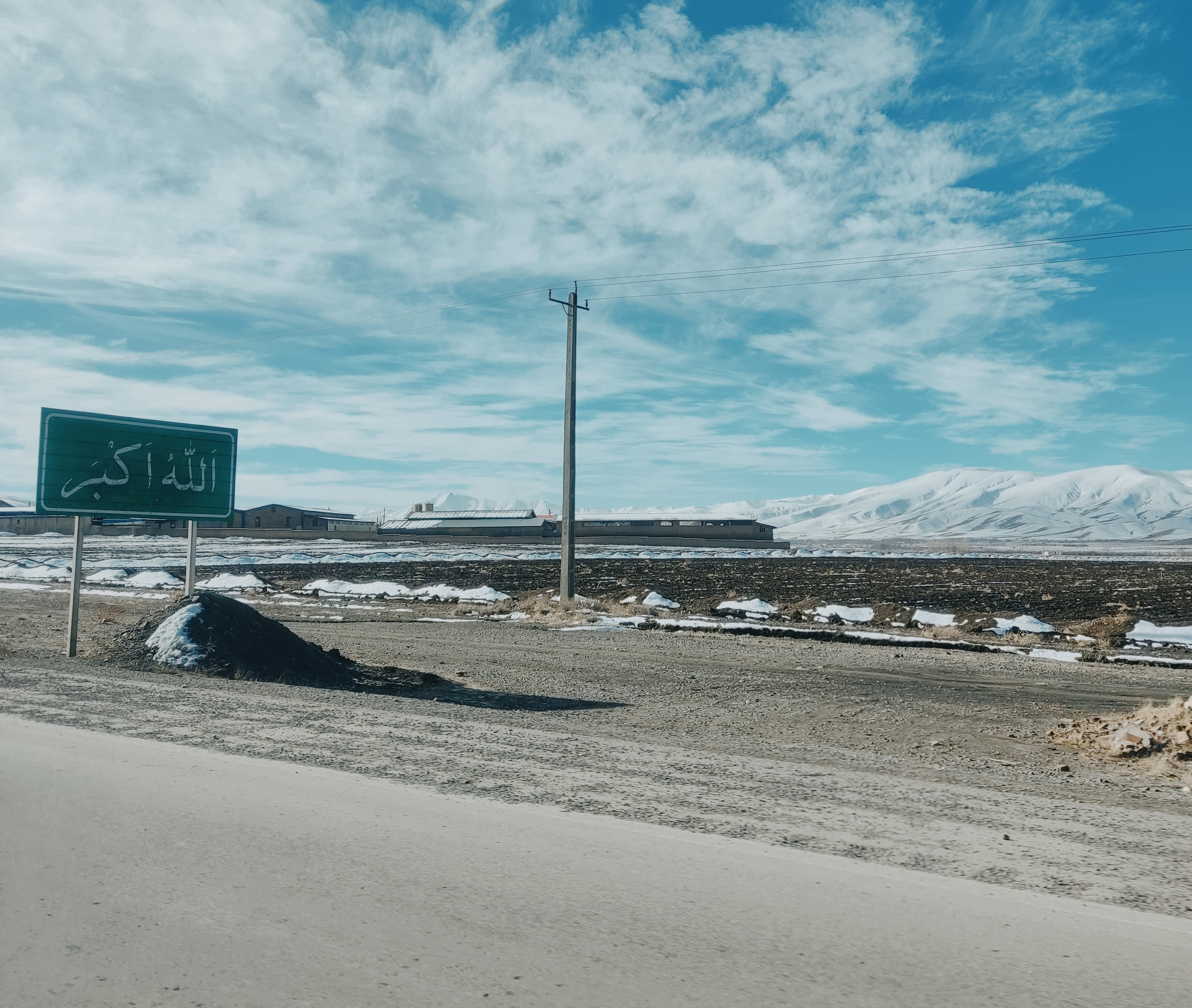
A sign with Allāhu akbar written on the side of a road in the Islamic Republic of Iran

The expression Allāhu ʾakbar can be used in a variety of situations, from celebrations to times of grief.

In a historical account by someone who was present both at the birth of the ruler Abd Allah ibn al-Zubayr (7th century) and at his funeral, the author observes that Allāhu ʾakbar was said on both occasions.

=== In times of joy and gratitude ===
The takbīr can be used to express joy or surprise. It is also used as applause in religious contexts, such as after a Quran recital, as other forms of applause are considered less appropriate.

It is used to celebrate an election win. As a multi-purpose phrase, it is sometimes used by Arab football commentators as an expression of amazement, or even as a football chant.

=== In battle ===
Historically, the takbīr has been used as a cry of victory during battle. Ibn Ishaq's 8th century Life of Muhammed narrates two occasions when Muhammad proclaimed the takbīr during battle.

=== Iran ===
During the Iranian Revolution of 1979, it was shouted from rooftops in Iran during the evenings as a form of protest. The takbīr was later adopted as the official motto of Iran. This practice returned in the 2009 Iranian presidential election protests, which protested the election results.

=== Usage by jihadists and terrorists ===
The phrase has been used in Islamic terrorist attacks, which has led to an association with jihadist violence. Notably, it has been used during the September 11 attacks, the Beslan school siege, the 7 July 2005 London bombings, the 2008 Mumbai attacks, the 2009 Fort Hood shooting, the Boston Marathon bombing, the Charlie Hebdo shooting, the 2015 Baga massacre, the November 2015 Paris attacks, the 2015–16 New Year's Eve sexual assaults across Germany, the 2016 Nice truck attack, the Manchester Arena bombing, the 2017 Notre-Dame de Paris attack, the 2017 Barcelona attacks, the 2019 Sri Lanka Easter bombings, the October 7 attacks in Israel, the Crocus City Hall attack, the 2025 Pahalgam attack, and the Bondi Beach shooting.

Professor Khaled A. Beydoun, author of The New Crusades: Islamophobia and the Global War on Muslims (2023), writes that the association of the phrase "Allah Akbar" with terrorism has been exacerbated by mass media and television pundits. He adds that films and shows also utilise it as a cinematic trope further cementing the association.

=== In politics ===
In India, Asaduddin Owaisi, president of the AIMIM and Abu Taher Khan, representing TMC, after being elected as members of the Indian Parliament, ended their oath with the slogan of "Allahu Akbar".

=== Usage by Christians ===
The phrase (Allah; meaning God in English) is recited by Arabic speaking Orthodox Christians as an expression of their faith. Palestinian Christians use Allah in their prayer to refer to the creator of the world, and the takbir as an expression of their faith. The use of takbir has been defended by Theodosios Hanna, the Palestinian Orthodox Archbishop of Sebastia.

== Use on flags ==
=== Afghanistan ===
The Afghan constitution that came into force on January 4, 2004, required that Allāhu akbar be inscribed on the flag of the Islamic Republic of Afghanistan. After the 2021 Taliban offensive, the flag of the first emirate was readopted, and thus the takbīr removed from the flag.

=== Iran ===
Allāhu akbar is written in stylised form across the bottom of the green stripe and the top of the red stripe of the flag of the Islamic Republic of Iran, adopted in 1980.

=== Iraq ===
The phrase Allāhu akbar is written on the centre of the flag of Iraq.

During the Gulf War in January 1991, Saddam Hussein held a meeting with top military commanders, where it was decided to add the words Allāhu akbar (described as the Islamic battle cry) to Iraq's flag to boost his secular regime's religious credentials, casting himself as the leader of an Islamic army. Hussein described the flag as "the banner of jihad and monotheism".

In 2004, the US-picked Iraqi Governing Council approved a new flag for Iraq that abandoned symbols of Hussein's regime, such as the words Allāhu akbar. In January 2008, however, Iraq's parliament passed a law to change the flag by leaving in the phrase, but changing the calligraphy of the words Allāhu akbar, which had been a copy of Hussein's handwriting, to a Kufic script. The Iraqi flag under Hussein had each of the two words of the phrase written in one of the spaces between the stars on the central band; the flag adopted in 2008 kept the phrase and removed the stars.

=== Other uses ===
A resistance movement that fought British rule in Waziristan, Pakistan, used a red flag bearing Allāhu akbar in white letters.

The flag used by the Houthis in Yemen also includes bearing Allāhu akbar in green letters.

Flag of Iraq, with stylized Kufic script, introduced in 2008

Flag of the Islamic Republic of Iran, introduced in 1980

Former flag of Afghanistan, with the phrase beneath the Shahada, used from 2004 to 2021

Flag of 1930s Waziristan (Pakistan) resistance movement

== See also ==
- Dhikr
- Tasbih
- Tahmid
- Tahlil
- Tasmiyah
- Salawat
- Shahada
- Hallelujah
- Hallel
- Alláh-u-Abhá
- Deo optimo maximo
