= Siri Dokken =

Norwegian illustrator (born 1966)

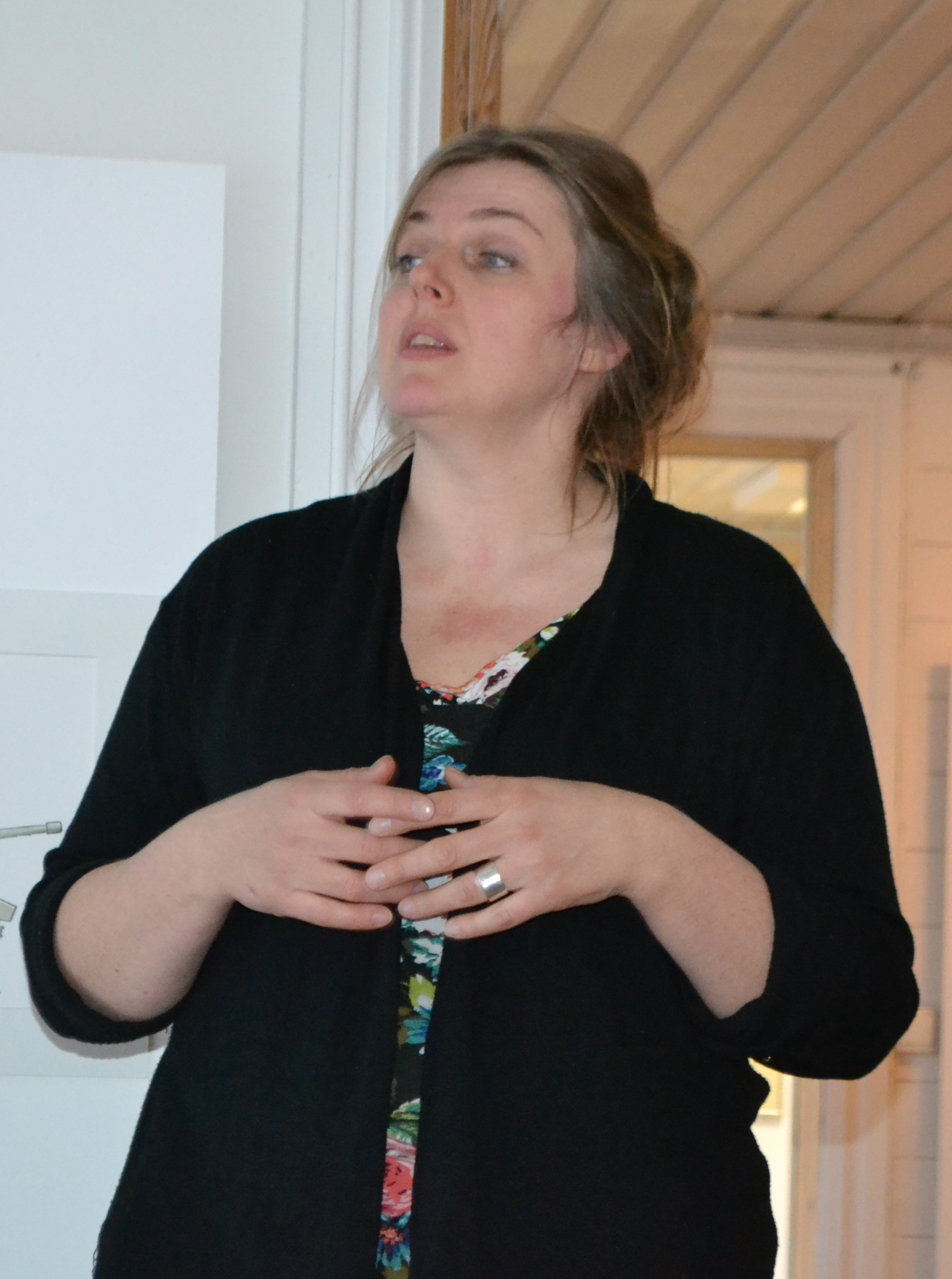
Dokken in 2013

Siri Dokken (born 5 July 1966) is a Norwegian illustrator.

Dokken was born in Bærum, and attended the Norwegian National Academy of Craft and Art Industry. She worked for the newspaper Dag og Tid from 1994 and then for Dagsavisen since 1995. She won the Swedish EWK Prize in 2005 and the Editorial Cartoon of the Year award in 2007 and 2011.

Awards
Preceded by Finn Graff (not awarded 2006)	Editorial Cartoon of the Year in Norway; 2007	Succeeded by Hallvard Skauge (not awarded 2008)
