= Khaled A. Beydoun =

Arab American law professor (born 1978)

- Born: 1978 (age 47–48); Detroit, Michigan, U.S.
- Occupation: Professor

Academic background
- Education: University of Michigan, AB; UCLA, JD; University of Toronto, LLM; Harvard University, MEd
- Thesis: Mortgaging God's Interest (2008)

Academic work
- Discipline: Law
- Institutions: Arizona State University
- Main interests: Constitutional Law, First Amendment, Religion, National Security, Islamophobia, Policing, Surveillance, Law & Tech

Khaled A. Beydoun (born 1978) is an Arab American and Muslim associate professor of law at Arizona State University's Sandra Day O'Connor College of Law. Beydoun focuses on issues such as on Islamophobia, particularly its relationship to the war on terror and U.S. national security issues. His books include American Islamophobia: Understanding the Roots and Rise of Fear and The New Crusades: Islamophobia and the Global War on Muslims. He is also the co-editor of Islamophobia and the Law, published by Cambridge University Press.

== Early life and education ==
Khaled Beydoun was born and raised in Detroit, Michigan. He holds degrees from the University of Michigan, the University of Toronto, and UCLA. Beydoun is also an Affiliate Faculty at the University of California, Berkeley Islamophobia Research & Documentation Project, and an Extraordinary Professor at the University of Western Cape's Desmond Tutu Centre for Religion and Social Justice. He formerly served as a Scholar-in-Residence at Harvard University's Berkman Klein Center IfRFA, and taught at several law schools, including the University of Arkansas, Wayne State University, and UCLA.

== Personal racial profiling experience ==
In 2019, on a domestic flight, Beydoun says he experienced racial profiling, which the Arkansas Times reported culminated with an assault involving the plane's captain. A police report was filed.

== Career ==
Beydoun's academic interests include constitutional law, civil rights, and the relationship between race and Islam in the United States. His research has been published in academic journals such as the UCLA Law Review, Northwestern University Law Review, and the Harvard Civil Rights–Civil Liberties Law Review. His work on issues such as surveillance, terrorism, and anti-Muslim policies have also been mentioned by The New York Times, The Washington Post, Al Jazeera, and CNN.

Beydoun focuses on identity matters tied to Arab, Middle Eastern, and Muslim identities, particularly in the context of the pro-Palestinian movement. His work has addressed events like the October 7 rally in Sydney, the Christchurch mosque shootings and the Gaza war. He has also spoken extensively about the Gaza conflict and its legal and humanitarian implications.

The Australian government cancelled Beydoun's visa in response to his claim, made in Sydney, that the anniversary of October 7 attacks represents a day of “considerable celebration”.

His work also extends to advising governments and policymaking bodies. Beydoun served on the U.S. Commission on Civil Rights for three years and earned an Open Society Foundations Equality Fellowship.

In 2021, Beydoun joined the Desmond Tutu Centre for Religion and Social Justice as an honorary faculty member.

Beydoun has received awards such as the Frederick Douglass Educator Award. In 2021, Beydoun was named an "Extraordinary Professor" by the University of Western Cape in South Africa.

In his book, The New Crusades: Islamophobia and the Global War on Muslims, he wrote that the association of the phrase "Allah Akbar" with terrorism has been exacerbated by mass media and television pundits. He adds that films and shows also utilize it as a cinematic trope.

== Selected publications ==
- Beydoun, Khaled A. (2025). Eyes on Gaza: Witnessing Annihilation. Illustrated by Mohammad Saba'aneh. Street Noise Books. ISBN 978-1951491413.
- Beydoun, Khaled A. (2024). The new crusades: Islamophobia and the global war on Muslims. Univ of California Press. ISBN 978-0520402690.
- Beydoun, Khaled A. (2018). American Islamophobia. Univ of California Press. ISBN 978-0-520-97000-7.
- Beydoun, Khaled, Lone Wolf Terrorism: Types, Stripes and Double Standards (March 21, 2018). 112 Northwestern Law Review (2018).
- Beydoun, Khaled and Ayoub, Abed, Executive Disorder: The Muslim Ban, Emergency Advocacy, and the Fires Next Time (November 25, 2017). 22 Michigan Journal of Race & Law 215 (2017).
- Beydoun, Khaled and Wilson, Erika K., Reverse Passing (February 21, 2016). UCLA Law Review, Vol. 64 (2017).
- Beydoun, Khaled A. (2016). "Electing Islamophobia". SSRN Electronic Journal. Elsevier BV. doi:10.2139/ssrn.2742857. ISSN 1556-5068.
- Beydoun, Khaled, Islamophobia: Toward a Legal Definition and Framework (2016). 116 Columbia Law Review Online 108 (2016).
- Beydoun, Khaled, Between Muslim and White: The Legal Construction of Arab American Identity (November 22, 2014). 69 N.Y.U. Ann. Surv. Am. L. 29 (2013).
- Beydoun, Khaled, The Trafficking of Ethiopian Domestic Workers into Lebanon: Navigating Through a Novel Passage of the International Maid Trade (2006). Berkeley Journal of International Law (BJIL), Vol. 24, p. 1009, 2006.
