= Wilhelmina Gravallius =

Swedish writer

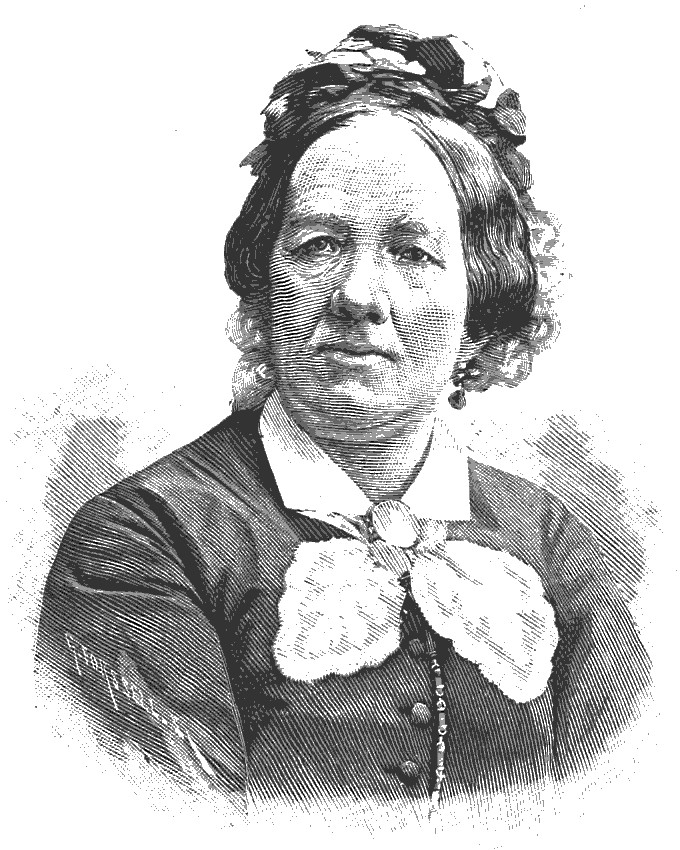
Wilhelmina Gravallius

Wilhelmina Carolina Gravallius (née Isaksson; 7 September 1807, Mogata – 22 November 1884, Botkyrka) was a Swedish writer.

She was born to parish vicar Carl Peter Isaksson and Anna Hallberg, and supported herself as a governess until 1846. She debuted with the novel Högadals prostgård (1844), which was a success. During her marriage to the vicar in Thoresund Christian Gravallius in 1846–1861, she was inactive as a writer. After his death, she moved to Stockholm and resumed her career. She published many novels as serials in newspapers and magazines. She was a popular novelist within the family novels of the time, but her novels were one-dimensional and morally very simplistic.
