= Hallvard Skauge =

Norwegian illustrator (born 1945)

Hallvard Skauge (born 11 September 1945) is a Norwegian illustrator.

He holds a cand.mag. degree from the University of Oslo, and started illustrating for the newspaper Klassekampen in 1970. His signature is "M". He has also worked for Nynorsk Pressekontor, Nationen, Dagens Næringsliv, LO-aktuelt and Journalisten. He won the Editorial Cartoon of the Year award in 2009. He has also illustrated books.

Awards
Preceded by Siri Dokken (not awarded 2008)	Editorial Cartoon of the Year in Norway; 2009	Succeeded by TBA
