= Ewert Karlsson =

Swedish artist and political cartoonist

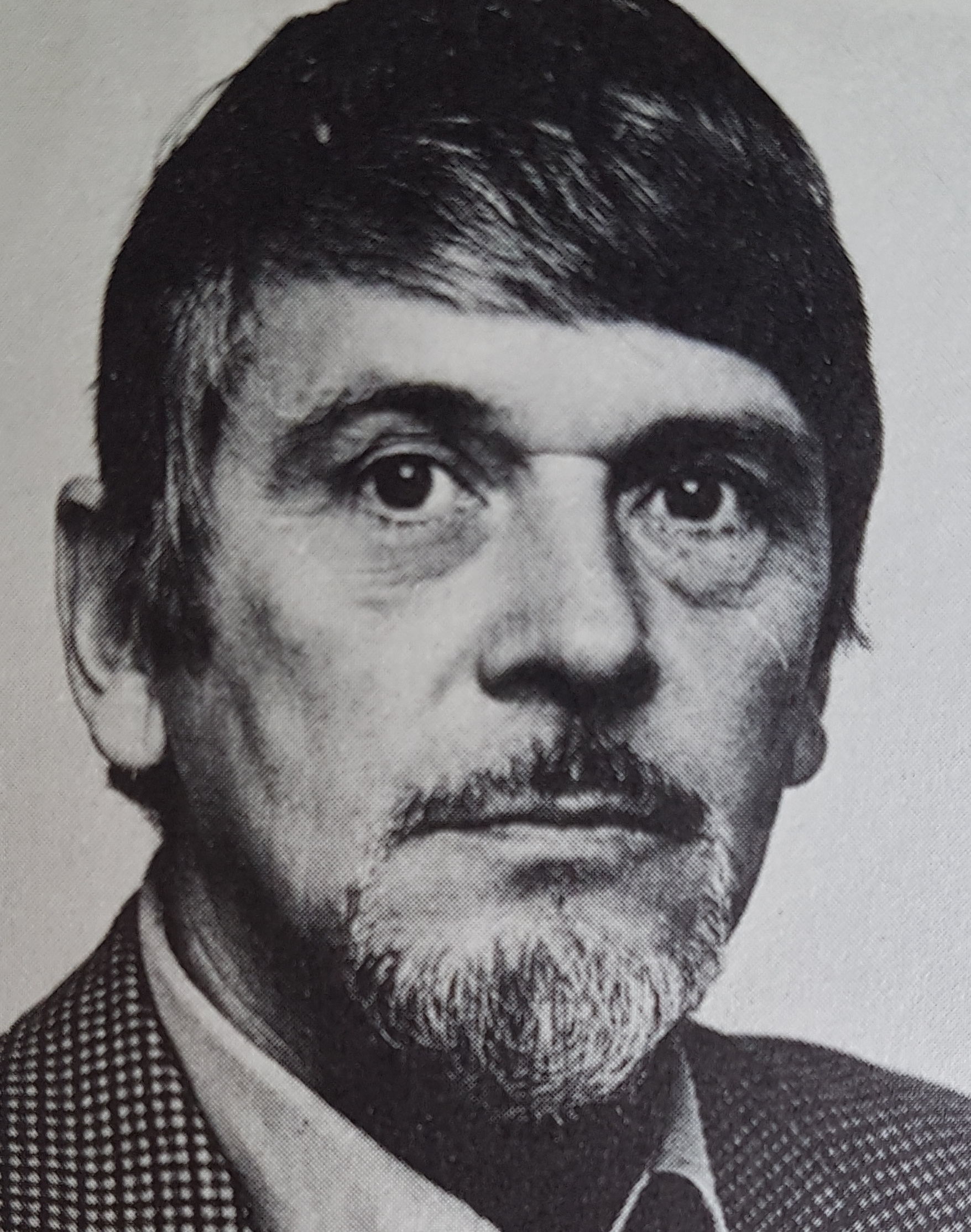
- Born: Mogata
- Died: 6 January 2004 (aged 85)
- Known for: caricature, editorial cartoon, illustrator

Ewert Karlsson (1918–2004), signature EWK, was a Swedish artist and political cartoonist. He drew for Aftonbladet and Land among others.

He illustrated Runer Jonsson's books about Vicke Viking.

In 1979 the EWK was declared Cartoonist of the year of The Sixteenth International Salon of Cartoons of Montréal. Attached to the general international Catalog as a tribute to the winning Artist, a personal anthological volume of his own is produced, limited to one thousand copies, by the city of Montréal and it is distributed to all the participating artists of the world

He was awarded the Illis quorum in both 1988 and 1993.

A museum about EWK and his drawings is located within the Museum of Work in Norrköping, Sweden.

== EWK Prize ==
The EWK Prize is an award established in 2000 by the EWK Society as a reward and to stimulate artists working in Ewert Karlsson's spirit. It includes a 10,000 Swedish Krona award (approximately $1,043 Dollars US) and a Thomas Qvarsebo designed plaque. The annual winner is selected by a jury that includes members from EWK Society, Fullersta, the Museum of Work and current political cartoonists.
