= Mohammad Saba'aneh =

Palestinian painter and cartoonist (born 1978)

- محمد سباعنة
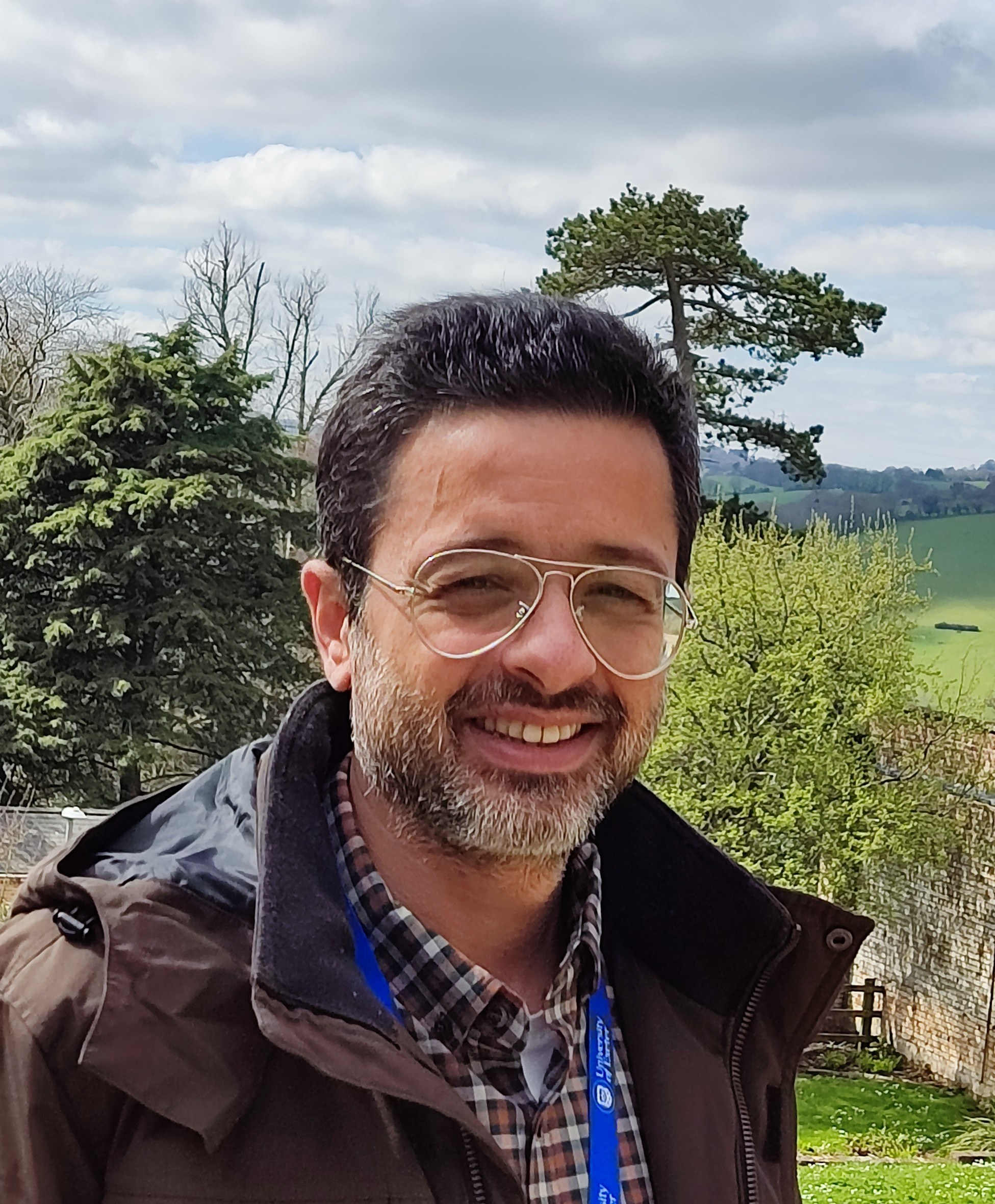
- Born: 1978 (age 47–48); Jenin district, Palestine
- Occupation: Caricaturist

Mohammad Saba'aneh (Arabic: محمد سباعنة, romanized: Muḥammad Sabāʿina; born 1978) is a Palestinian cartoonist and caricaturist from Jenin district, West Bank.

== Career ==
Saba'aneh is a cartoonist for Al-Hayat al-Jadida, the official newspaper of the Palestinian Authority, and also works at the Arab American University in Jenin. He has been an active member on the Cartoon Movement.

In September 2021, Saba'aneh released Power Born of Dreams: My Story is Palestine, a graphic memoir which recounts his five months spent in an Israeli prison. The book won a 2022 Palestine Book Award. It was also shortlisted for the Ignatz Award for Outstanding Graphic Novel.

In 2025, he collaborated with The Lakes International Comic Art Festival to release Safaa Odah's Safaa and the Tent, a collection of comics made by Odah from October 2023 to December 2024 while living in a tent after being displaced by the Gaza war.

He provided the art for the 2025 book Eyes on Gaza by Khaled Beydoun.

In 2026, he published 30 Seconds from Gaza: Diary of Genocide, a comics collection about the Gaza genocide. In June of the same year, he published Welcome to Hell: From the West Bank to Gaza, about his brother Thamer’s 13-month incarceration.

== 2013 imprisonment ==
In February 2013, Saba'aneh was detained at the King Hussain checkpoint between Jordan and the West Bank and was jailed for five months in an Israeli prison, which was depicted in Power Born of Dreams.

== See also ==
- Palestinian art
