= Mogata =

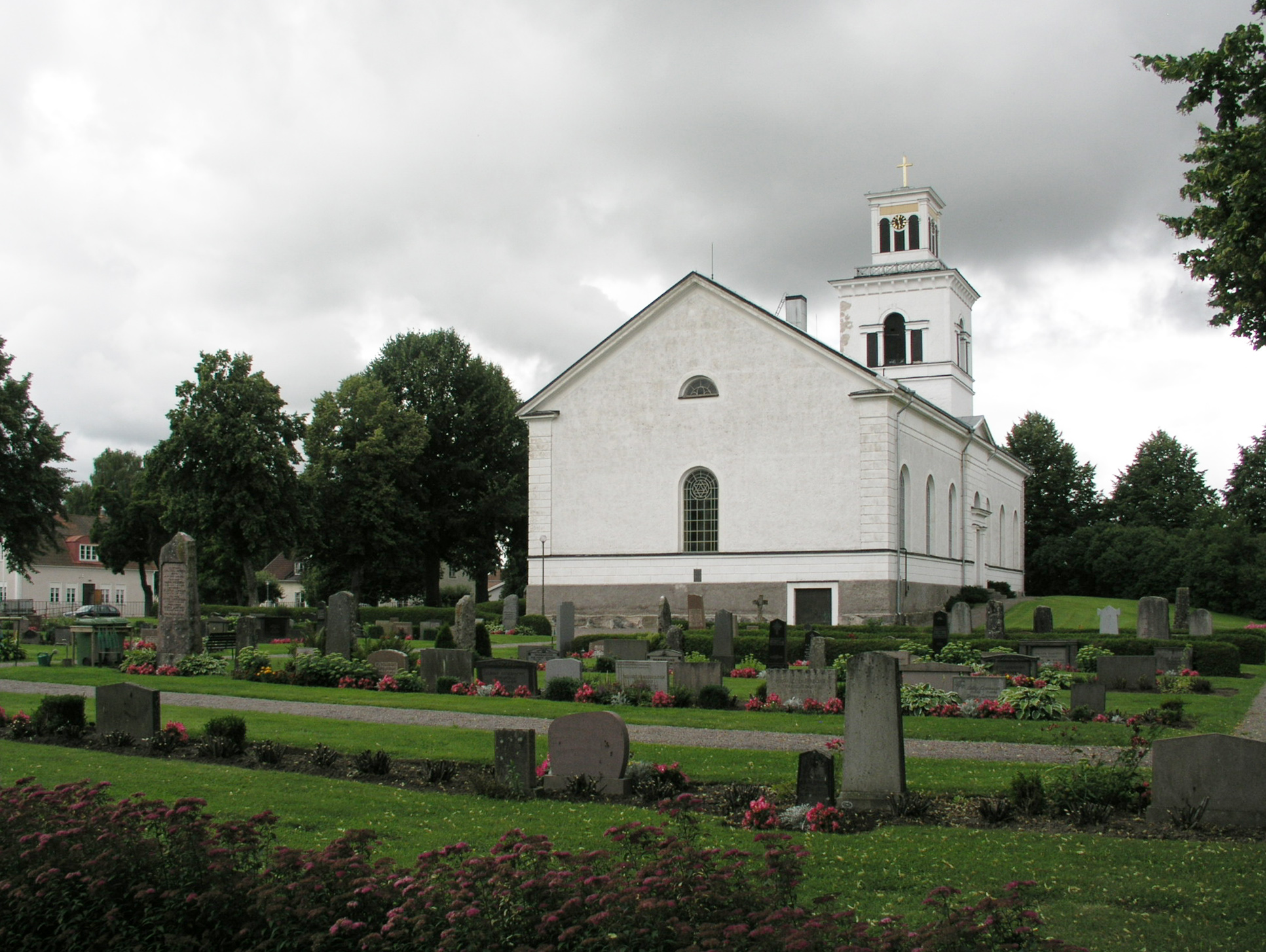
- Mogata church

- Location within Östergötland Location within Sweden
- Coordinates: 58°27′N 16°27′E
- Country: Sweden
- Province: Östergötland
- County: Östergötland County
- Municipality: Söderköping Municipality

Area
  - Total: 0.36 km^{2} (0.14 sq mi)

Population (31 December 2010)
  - Total: 301
  - Density: 831/km^{2} (2,150/sq mi)
- Time zone: UTC+1 (CET)
  - Summer (DST): UTC+2 (CEST)

Mogata is a locality situated in Söderköping Municipality, Östergötland County, Sweden with 301 inhabitants in 2010.

== Notable residents ==
- Wilhelmina Gravallius (1809-1884), writer
