= Museum of Work =

Museum in Norrköping, Sweden

Coordinates: 58°35′21.00″N 16°10′48.20″E

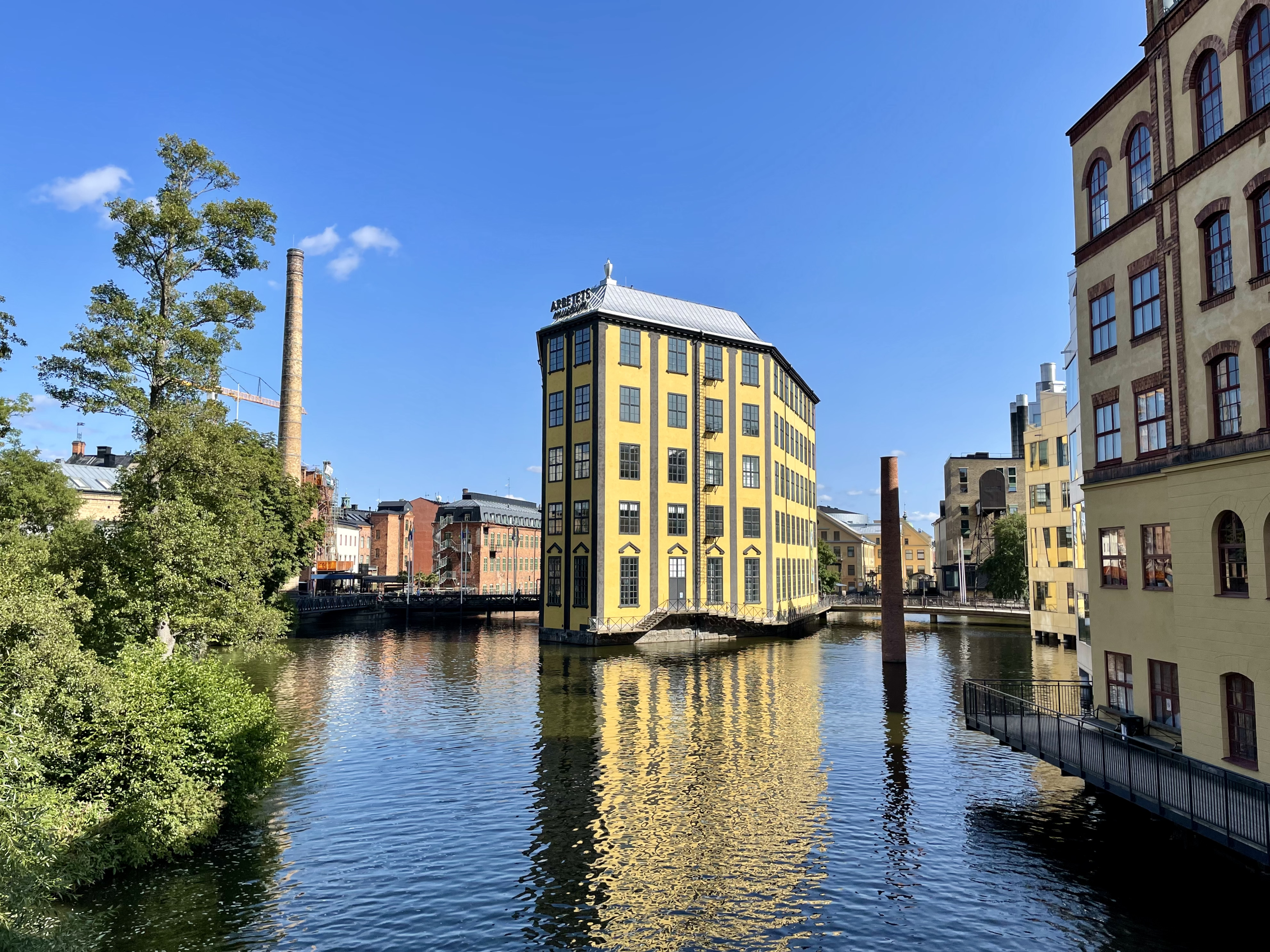
Styrkjärn in central Norrköping

The Museum of Work (Arbetets museum) is a museum located in Norrköping, Sweden. The museum is located in Strykjärnet, a former weaving mill in the old industrial area on the Motala ström river in the city centre of Norrköping. The former textile factory Holmens Bruk operated in the building from 1917 to 1962.

The museum documents work and everyday life by collecting personal stories about people's professional lives from both the past and the present. The museum's archive contain material from memory collections and documentation projects.

Since 2009, the museum also houses the EWK – Center for Political Illustration Art, which is based on work of the satirist Ewert Karlsson (1918–2004). For decades he was frequently published in the Swedish tabloid, Aftonbladet.

== Overview ==
The museum is a national central museum with the task of preserving and telling about work and everyday life. It has, among other things, exhibitions on the terms and conditions of the work and the history of the industrial society. The museum is also known to highlight gender perspective in their exhibitions.

The work museum documents work and everyday life by collecting personal stories, including people's professional life from both the past and present. In the museum's archive, there is a rich material of memory collections and documentation projects – over 2600 interviews, stories and photodocumentations have been collected since the museum opened.

The museum is also a support for the country's approximately 1,500 working life museums that are old workplaces preserved to convey their history.

== Exhibitions ==
The Museum of Work shows exhibitions going on over several years, but also shorter exhibitions – including several photo exhibitions on themes that can be linked to work and everyday life.

=== The history of Alva ===
The history of Alva Karlsson is the only exhibition in the museum that is permanent. The exhibition connects to the museum's building and its history as part of the textile industry in Norrköping. Alva worked as a rollers between the years 1927 – 1962.

=== Industriland ===
One of the museum long-term exhibitions is Industriland – when Sweden became modern, the exhibition was in 2007–2013 and consisted of an ongoing bond with various objects that were somehow significant both for working life and everyday during the period 1930–1980. The exhibition also consisted of presentations of the working life museums in Sweden and a number of rooms with themes such as: leisure, world, living and consumption.

=== Framtidsland (Future country) ===
In 2014, the exhibition was inaugurated that takes by where Industriland ends: Future country. It is an exhibition that investigates what a sustainable society is will be part of the museum's exhibitions until 2019. The exhibition consists of materials that are designed based on conversations between young people and researchers around Sweden. The exhibition addresses themes such as work, environment and everyday life. A tour version of the exhibition is given in the locations Falun, Kristianstad and Örebro.

== EWK – The Center for Political Illustration Art ==
Since 2009, the Museum also houses EWK – center for political illustration art. The museum preserves, develops and conveys the political illustrator Ewert Karlsson's production. The museum also holds theme exhibitions with national and international political illustrators with the aim of highlighting and strengthening the political art.

== See also ==
- List of museums in Sweden
- Culture of Sweden
