= Flu (disambiguation) =

The flu is the common name for influenza, an infectious disease of birds and mammals caused by RNA viruses of the family Orthomyxoviridae, the influenza viruses.

Flu or FLU may also refer to:

== Diseases ==
=== Influenza ===
- Influenza virus, the viruses that cause the disease
- Avian flu, influenza caused by viruses adapted to birds
- Dog flu, influenza occurring in canine animals
- Equine flu, influenza caused by viruses endemic in horses
- Human flu, influenza caused by viruses endemic in human populations
- Swine flu, influenza caused by viruses endemic in pigs
- Influenza A virus subtype H5N1, a strain of avian influenza

=== Other diseases ===
- Flu-like illness, illness similar to flu, mistaken for flu, called flu
- Cat flu, the common name for a feline upper respiratory tract disease
- Haemophilus influenzae, or H. flu, a bacterial infection which can cause respiratory infections and sepsis
- Influenza-like illness, a medical diagnosis of possible influenza or other illness causing a set of common symptoms
- Stomach flu, also known as gastroenteritis

== People ==
- Fluent Form, Australian rapper also known as Flu

== Places ==
- Flushing Airport (IATA airport code: FLU; ICAO airport code: KFLU), Queens, New York City, New York State, USA

== Art, entertainment, and media ==
- Flu Press, an imprint of VDM Publishing devoted to the reproduction of Wikipedia content
- Flu (film), a 2013 South Korean film
- "The Flu" (The Golden Girls), a 1986 television episode
- "The Flu" (Parks and Recreation), or "Flu Season", a 2011 television episode

== Other uses ==
- FLU (plant gene), a mutation that causes plants to glow red in presence of blue light
- Federation of Hong Kong and Kowloon Labour Unions (FLU or HKFLU), a labour federation and political party
- Man flu, a pejorative term meaning men exaggerate cold symptoms
- Foreningen af Lokalunioner i Danmark (FLU), the old name for the organization of Danish regional football associations.
- short name for Fluminense FC

== See also ==
- Flew (disambiguation)
- Flue, a duct, pipe, or opening in a chimney for conveying exhaust gases
- Influenza (disambiguation)
- Grippe (disambiguation)
- ful (disambiguation)
- UFL (disambiguation)
- ULF (disambiguation)
- LUF (disambiguation)
- LFU (disambiguation)
