= Grip =

Grip(s) or The Grip may refer to:

== Common uses ==
- Grip (occupation), a job in the film industry
- Grip strength, a measure of hand strength

== Music ==
- Grip (percussion), a method for holding a drum stick or mallet
- Grip (album), a 2024 album by serpentwithfeet
- The Grip, a 1977 album by Arthur Blythe
- Grip, a 1996 album by Husking Bee
- The Grip, a 2011 EP by Cerebral Ballzy
- "Grip", a song by Lights from Pep, 2022
- "Grip" (song), by Seeb and Bastille, 2018
- "(Get A) Grip (On Yourself)", a 1977 song by the Stranglers
- "Grip!", a 2003 song by Every Little Thing from Many Pieces

== Organizations ==
- Grip Ltd., a Toronto, Canada, design firm, originally founded to publish Grip magazine
  - Grip (magazine), an 1873–1894 satirical magazine
- Grip Digital, a Czech video game developer and publisher
- German Research Institute for Public Administration, Speyer, Rhineland Palatinate, Germany
- National Graduate Institute for Policy Studies, Minato, Tokyo, Japan

== People ==
- Grip (rapper) (born 1989), rapper
- Jouko Grip (born 1949), Finnish Paralympic athlete
- Håvard Fjær Grip, Norwegian cybernetics engineer

== Places ==
- Grip, Norway, an archipelago and deserted fishing village in Møre og Romsdal county, Norway
  - Grip Municipality, a former municipality (1897–1964) that included the archipelago
  - Grip Lighthouse
- Grips-Theater, a youth theater in Berlin, Germany

== Science and technology ==
- Grip (software), a CD-ripping software program
- Grip, a part of a scrollbar
- Battery grip, a camera accessory
- Cable grip, a component of cable car systems
- Pistol grip, the handle of a firearm, or a similar handle on a tool
- Glutamate receptor-interacting protein
- Greenland ice core project

== Sports ==
- Grip (auto racing), the cornering performance of a race car
- Grip (badminton), how a badminton racket is held
- Grip (cricket bowling), how a cricket ball is held by a bowler
- Grip (gymnastics), a device worn on the hands of gymnasts
- Grip (pickleball), how a pickleball paddle is held
- Grip (sport fencing), the hilt of a fencing weapon
- Grip (sword), part of the hilt of a blade weapon
- Grip (tennis), how a tennis racket is held

== Other uses ==
- Grip: Combat Racing, a racing video game
- Grip (raven), talking raven kept as a pet by Charles Dickens
- "Grip", a raven character in Charles Dickens' Barnaby Rudge
- The Grip (TV series), a 1994–1998 Irish children's sports programme
- Grip (or gripsack), a slang term for suitcase from the late 1800s into the mid-20th century
- Coordinated Regional Incident Management (Netherlands), an emergency management procedure in the Netherlands
- Governance for Railway Investment Projects, United Kingdom, for managing railway infrastructure projects

== See also ==
- Grippe (influenza)
- Grippe (disambiguation)
