= Asian flu (disambiguation) =

The Asian flu or 1957–58 influenza pandemic was an influenza pandemic which originated in China.

Asian flu may also refer to:

- Influenza A virus subtype H2N2, the virus that caused the pandemic
- 1997 Asian financial crisis

== See also ==
- 1889–1890 flu pandemic, aka Asiatic Flu, suspected of being caused by a coronavirus
- Flu pandemic
- Flu (disambiguation)
