= Full =

Full may refer to:

- People with the surname Full, including:
  - Mr. Full (given name unknown), acting Governor of German Cameroon, 1913 to 1914
- A property in the mathematical field of topology; see Full set
- A property of functors in the mathematical field of category theory; see Full and faithful functors
- Satiety, the absence of hunger
- A standard bed size, see Bed
- Full house (poker), a type of poker hand
- Fulling, also known as tucking or walking ("waulking" in Scotland), term for a step in woollen clothmaking (verb: to full)
- Full-Reuenthal, a municipality in the district of Zurzach in the canton of Aargau in Switzerland

== See also ==
- "Fullest", a song by the rapper Cupcakke
- Ful (disambiguation)
