= Grippe (disambiguation) =

Grippe is the French term for influenza, an infectious disease.

Grippe may also refer to:

- Grippe (album), by Jawbox, 1991
- Grippe, West Virginia, US
- Peter Grippe (1912–2002), American artist
- Jacqueline Laurita (née Grippe; born 1970), American television personality

== See also ==
- Grip (disambiguation)
- Influenza (disambiguation)
- Flu (disambiguation)
