= Flew =

Flew may refer to:

- Past participle of the verb "to fly", relating to flight
- Flew (surname), list of people with the surname
- Flews, part of canid anatomy
