= Influenza (disambiguation) =

Influenza is a disease commonly called the flu.

It may also refer to:

== Disease ==
=== Flu ===
- Influenzavirus, the viruses that cause influenza disease
- Influenza epidemic, "the influenza" mass disease for a given region in a given year
- Influenza pandemic, "the influenza" global mass disease for a given year
- Seasonal influenza, "the influenza" for a given year
- 1918 influenza pandemic

=== Other ===
- Influenza-like illness, illness that resembles, mistaken for, called influenza
- Intestinal influenza (stomach flu), gastroenteritis not necessarily related to influenza
- Parainfluenza

== Songs ==
- Influenza (2000 song), a song by Kruder & Dorfmeister
- Influenza (1997 song), a B-side by Tanya Donelly off the album Lovesongs for Underdogs
- Influenza (1983 song), a song by Gene Loves Jezebel off the album Promise (Gene Loves Jezebel album)
- Influenza (1982 song), a song by Todd Rundgren off the album The Ever Popular Tortured Artist Effect

== Other uses ==
- Haemophilus influenzae (H. influenzae) a bacterium mistakenly thought to cause influenza
- PLOS Currents: Influenza (2009–13), a defunct research journal
- Influenza: The Musical (Even Stevens), a 2002 episode of Even Stevens

== See also ==
- Haemophilus influenzae
- Influenza and Other Respiratory Viruses, a research journal
- Flu (disambiguation)
- Grippe (disambiguation)
- Influence (disambiguation)
