= Grip Municipality =

Former municipality in Møre og Romsdal, Norway

Grip Municipality Grip herred
- Former municipality
- Møre og Romsdal within Norway

- Grip within Møre og Romsdal
- Coordinates: 63.2195°N 7.5931°E
- Country: Norway
- County: Møre og Romsdal
- District: Nordmøre
- Established: 1 Jan 1897
  - Preceded by: Frei Municipality
- Disestablished: 1 Jan 1964
  - Succeeded by: Kristiansund Municipality
- Administrative centre: Gripholmen

Government
  - Mayor (1962–1964): Peder Pedersen, Jr.

Area (upon dissolution)
  - Total: 0.48 km^{2} (0.19 sq mi)
  - Rank: #684 in Norway
- Highest elevation: 11 m (36 ft)

Population (1963)
  - Total: 115
  - Rank: #689 in Norway
  - Density: 239.6/km^{2} (621/sq mi)
  - Change (10 years): ▼ −36.8%
- Demonym: Gripværing

Official language
  - Norwegian form: Bokmål
- Time zone: UTC+01:00 (CET)
  - Summer (DST): UTC+02:00 (CEST)
- ISO 3166 code: NO-1555

Grip (Norwegian pronunciation: [ˈɡriːp]) is a former municipality in Møre og Romsdal county, Norway. With a land area of only 0.48 square kilometres (120 acres) and a population of between 100 and 200 people, Grip was one of the smallest municipalities in Norway during its existence from 1897 until it merged with Kristiansund Municipality in 1964. Grip Municipality included all the islands in the Grip archipelago. The administrative centre of the municipality was the one fishing village in the municipality, known as Gripholmen, where the historic Grip Stave Church is located.

Prior to its dissolution in 1964, the 0.48-square-kilometre (120-acre) municipality was the 684th largest by area out of the 689 municipalities in Norway (making it the 5th smallest in the country). Grip Municipality was the 689th most populous municipality in Norway with a population of about 115 (the smallest municipality by population in the country). The municipality's population density was 239.6 inhabitants per square kilometre (621/sq mi) and its population had decreased by 36.8% over the previous 10-year period.

== General information ==
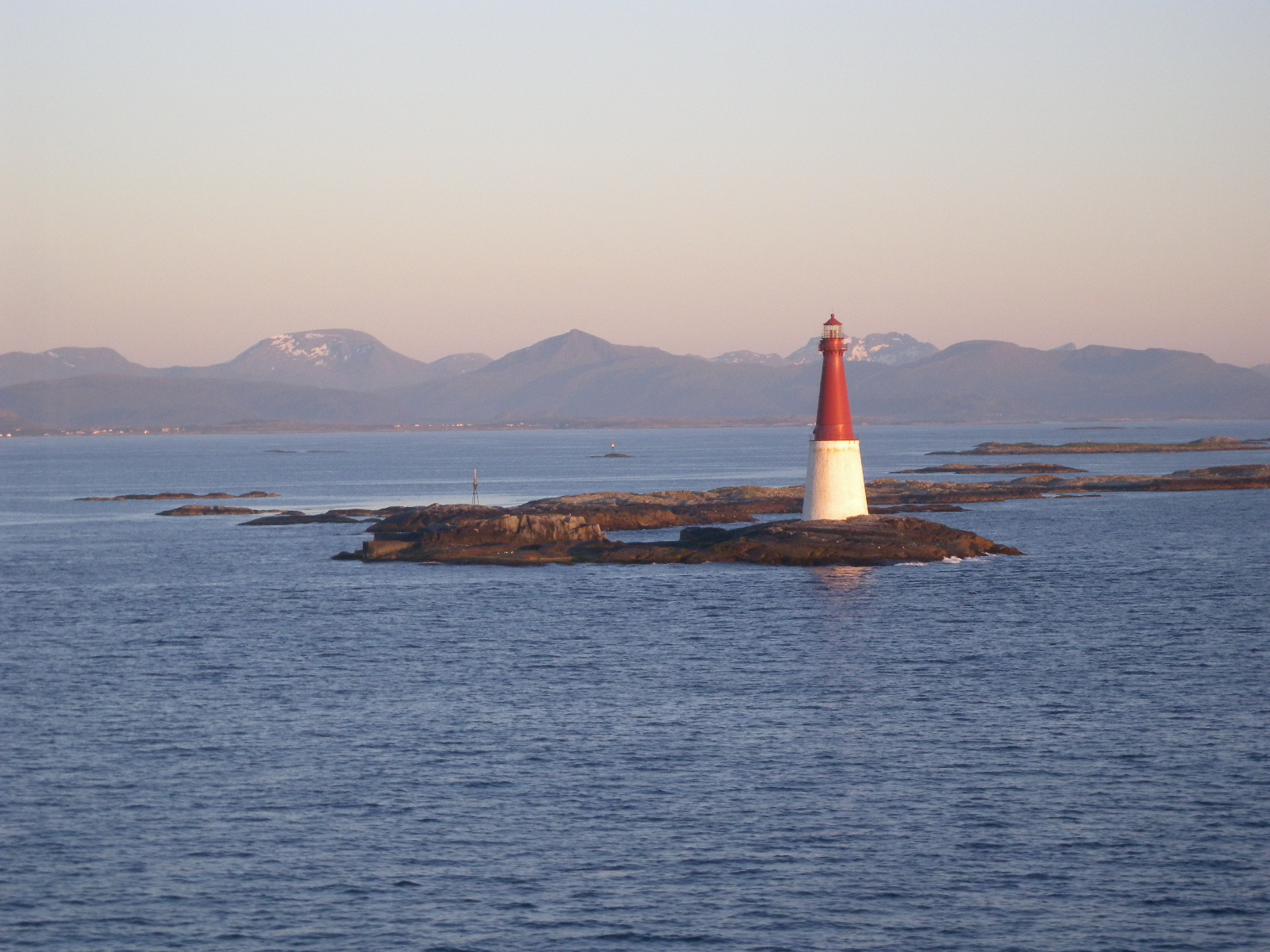
View of Grip lighthouse

The formannskapsdistrikt law of 1837 required that every parish in Norway should be constituted as a municipality starting on 1 January 1838. It also required that parishes composed of a town with a rural district should be divided into two municipalities (a town municipality and a rural municipality). In 1837, the town of Kristiansund and the rural districts of Frei and Grip were part of the same parish. The parish of Frei became the new Frei Municipality under the new law, but Grip had no men with the right to vote so it was not considered a municipality, rather it became part of Frei Municipality. Prior to 1884, the right to vote was in Norway was mostly limited to men with property. In a fishing village, such as Grip, where one merchant in the town owned all the houses, nobody had the right to vote, so Grip was not allowed to have a municipal government. Through constitutional changes in 1884, the right to vote was extended to all men who paid taxes. Since the fishermen in Grip paid income taxes, Grip finally had a voting population and would be eligible to become a separate municipality. Grip Municipality was officially separated from Frei Municipality in 1897 and it became a separate municipality with a population of 198.

Grip Municipality bought the whole fishing village from the merchant Ludvig Williamsen in 1909. Prior to that time, basically the entire community had been the property of one merchant from Kristiansund (except for the church, school, and three private houses). The price of 110,000 kr was financed through a public loan to be paid back in 45 years. The municipality then began selling the houses to their inhabitants. A census in 1910 showed a population of 187.

During the 1960s, there were many municipal mergers across Norway due to the work of the Schei Committee. On 1 January 1964, the following areas were merged to form a new, larger Kristiansund Municipality:

- all of Grip Municipality (population: 104)
- the town of Kristiansund (population: 17,275)
- the Dale area of Bremsnes Municipality (population: 963).

=== Name ===
The municipality (originally the parish) is named after the island of Grip (Old Norse: Grípar) since the Grip Stave Church was built there. The name was first found in existing historical records in 1338 and it is a plural form of the word which makes sense since Grip is an archipelago. The meaning of the name is uncertain, but it may be from the Old Norse verb grípa which means "catch", "seize", or "grip". If this is the case, then it probably refers to the catching of fish here.

=== Churches ===
The Church of Norway had one parish (sokn) within Grip Municipality. At the time of the municipal dissolution, it was part of the Kristiansund prestegjeld and the Ytre Nordmøre prosti (deanery) in the Diocese of Nidaros.

Churches in Grip Municipality
Parish (sokn)	Church name	Location of the church	Year built
Grip	Grip Stave Church	Gripholmen	1470

== Geography ==
The municipality included the whole Grip archipelago, located about 12 kilometres (7.5 mi) northwest of the town of Kristiansund. The highest point in the municipality was the 11-metre (36 ft) tall hill on the island of Gripholmen.

== Government ==
While it existed, Grip Municipality was responsible for primary education (through 10th grade), outpatient health services, senior citizen services, welfare and other social services, zoning, economic development, and municipal roads and utilities. The municipality was governed by a municipal council of directly elected representatives. The mayor was indirectly elected by a vote of the municipal council. The municipality was under the jurisdiction of the Frostating Court of Appeal.

=== Municipal council ===
The municipal council (Herredsstyre) of Grip Municipality was made up of 13 representatives that were elected to four-year terms. The tables below show the historical composition of the council by political party.

Grip herredsstyre 1959–1963
Party name (in Norwegian)	Number of representatives
Local List(s) (Lokale lister)	13
Total number of members:	13

Grip herredsstyre 1955–1959
Party name (in Norwegian)	Number of representatives
Local List(s) (Lokale lister)	13
Total number of members:	13

Grip herredsstyre 1951–1955
Party name (in Norwegian)	Number of representatives
Local List(s) (Lokale lister)	12
Total number of members:	12

Grip herredsstyre 1947–1951
Party name (in Norwegian)	Number of representatives
Local List(s) (Lokale lister)	12
Total number of members:	12

Grip herredsstyre 1945–1947
Party name (in Norwegian)	Number of representatives
Local List(s) (Lokale lister)	12
Total number of members:	12

Grip herredsstyre 1937–1941*
Party name (in Norwegian)	Number of representatives
Local List(s) (Lokale lister)	12
Total number of members:	12
Note: Due to the German occupation of Norway during World War II, no elections were held for new municipal councils until after the war ended in 1945.

=== Mayors ===
The mayor (Norwegian: ordfører) of Grip Municipality was the political leader of the municipality and the chairperson of the municipal council. The following people have held this position:

- 1897–1910: Andreas Jørussen Grip
- 1911–1922: Peder Edvard Pedersen
- 1923–1925: Thomas Thoresen
- 1926–1928: Peder B. Brunvoll
- 1929–1931: Olaf Kristiansen
- 1932–1934: Peder Edvard Pedersen
- 1935–1937: Olaf Kristiansen
- 1938–1942: Isak Roksvåg
- 1943–1944: Johannes Thomassen
- 1945–1945: Olaf Kristiansen
- 1945–1945: Peder B. Brunvoll
- 1945–1945: Mikael Nerland
- 1946–1947: Kristian Pedersen
- 1948–1961: Mikael Nerland
- 1962–1964: Peder Pedersen Jr.

== Media gallery ==
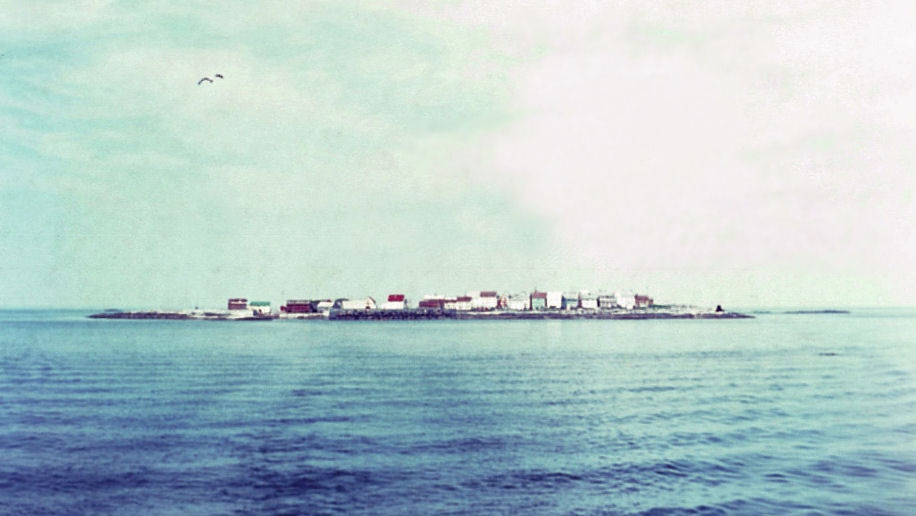
View of the village in 1967

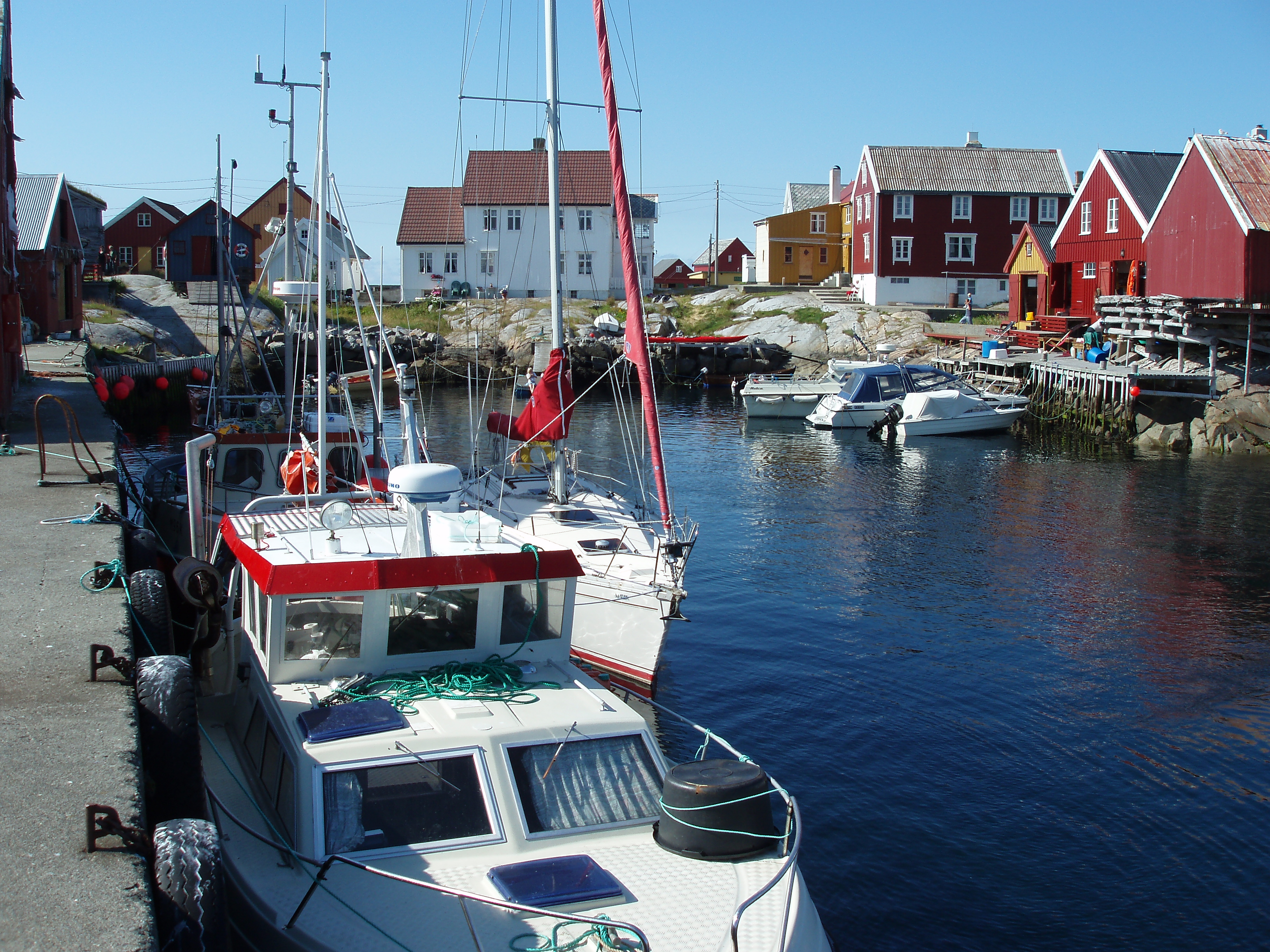
The south harbour

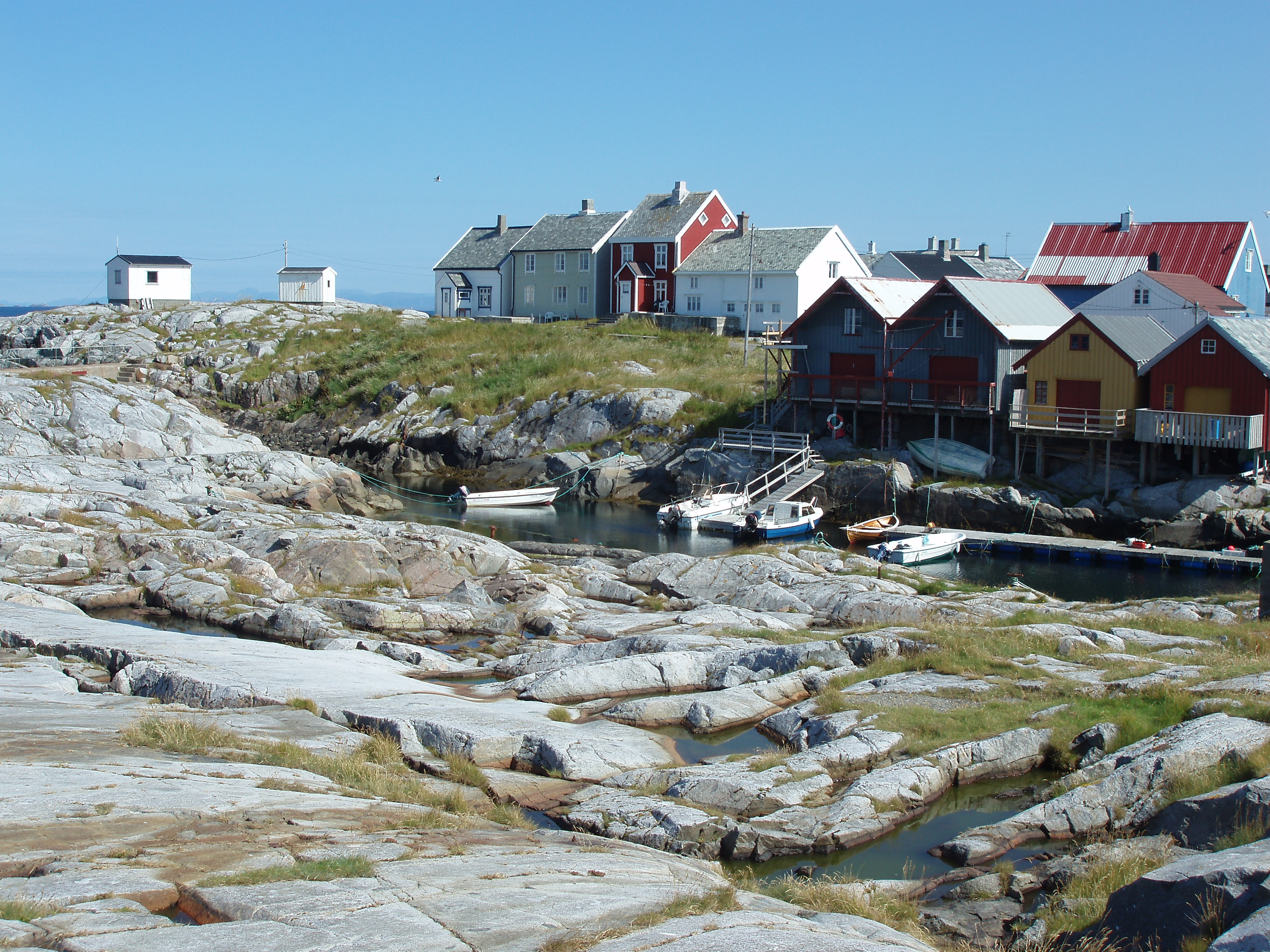
Houses on the north side

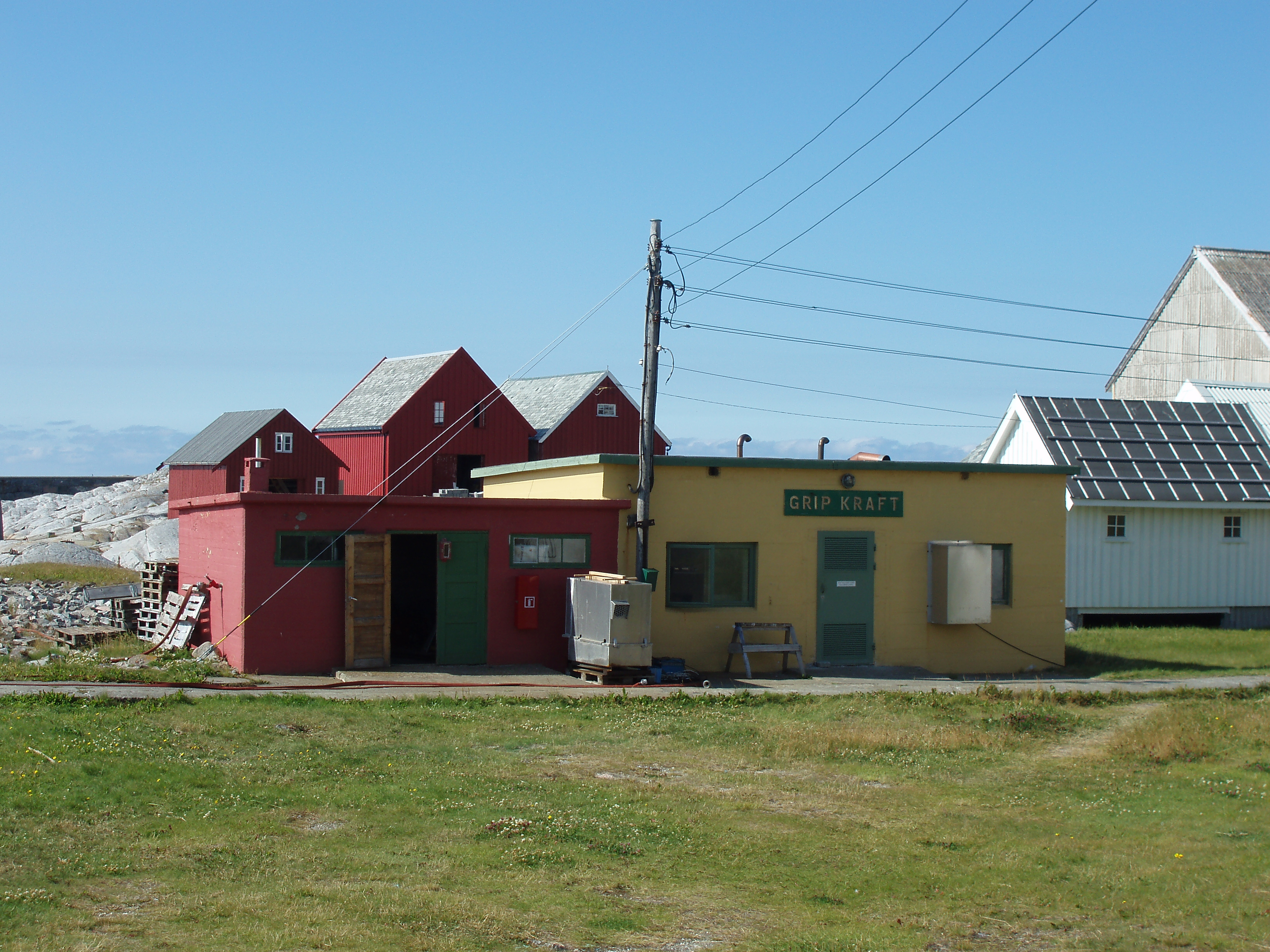
Grip power station

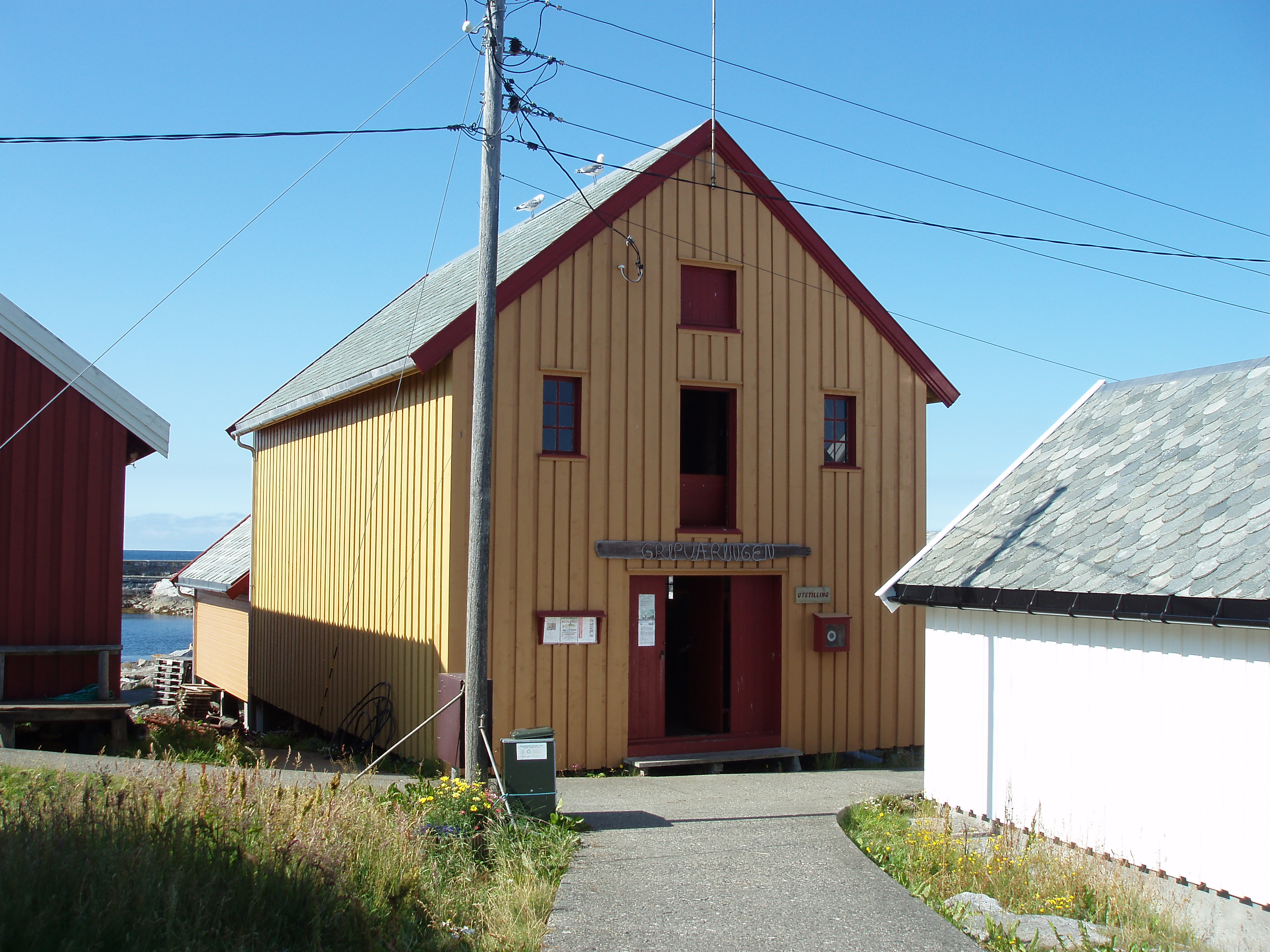
The community house

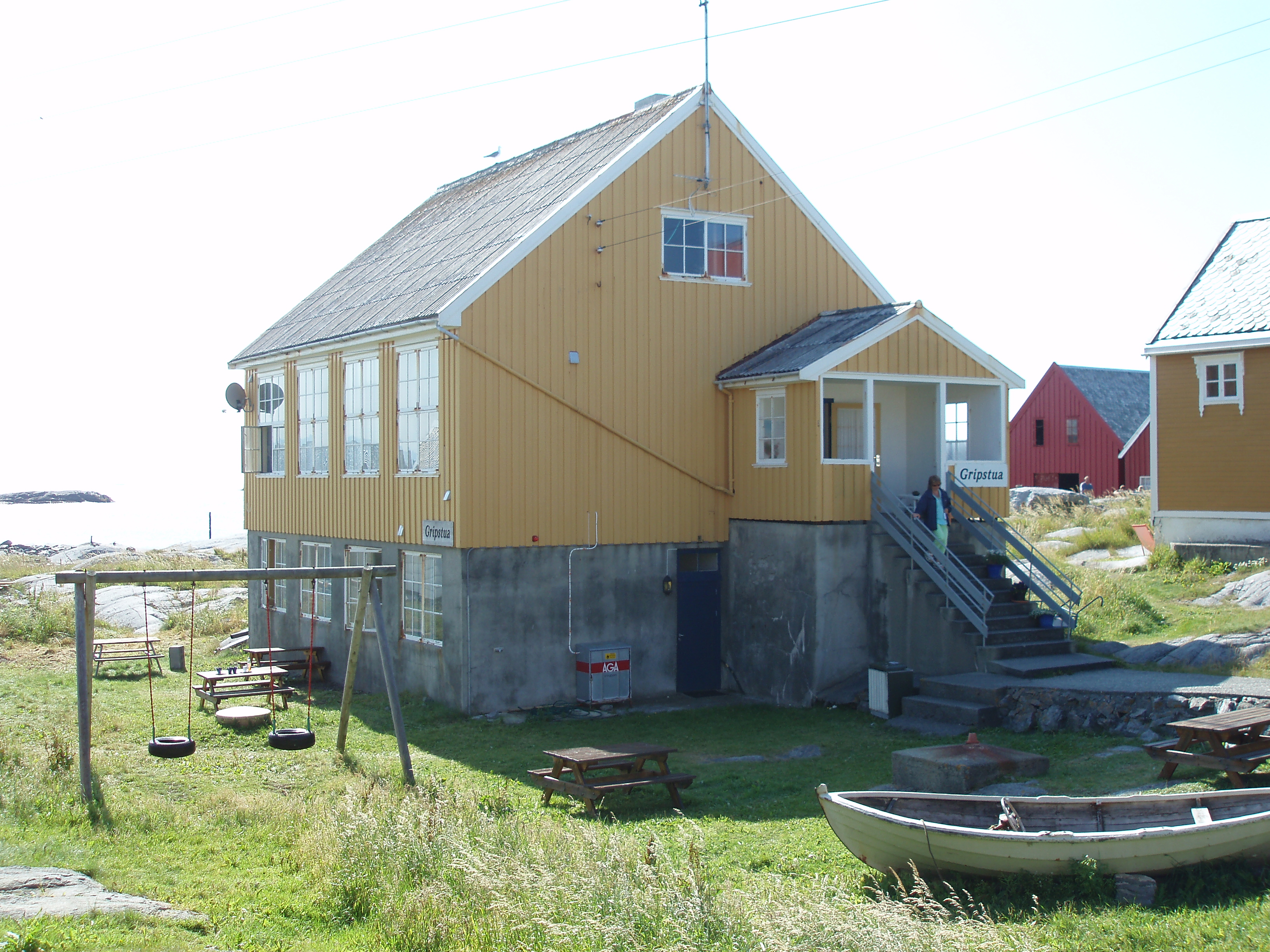
The schoolhouse inn

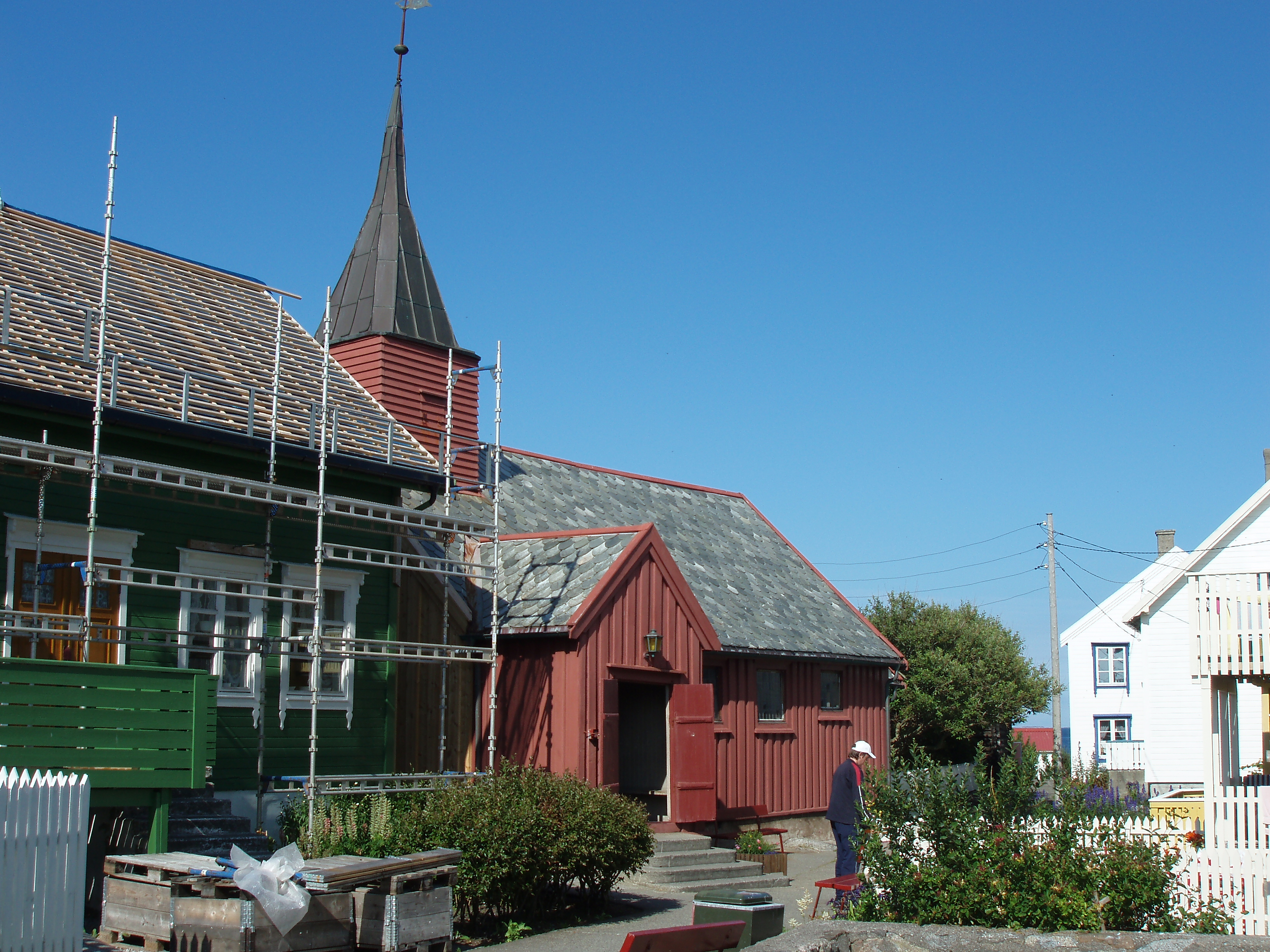
Grip Stave Church

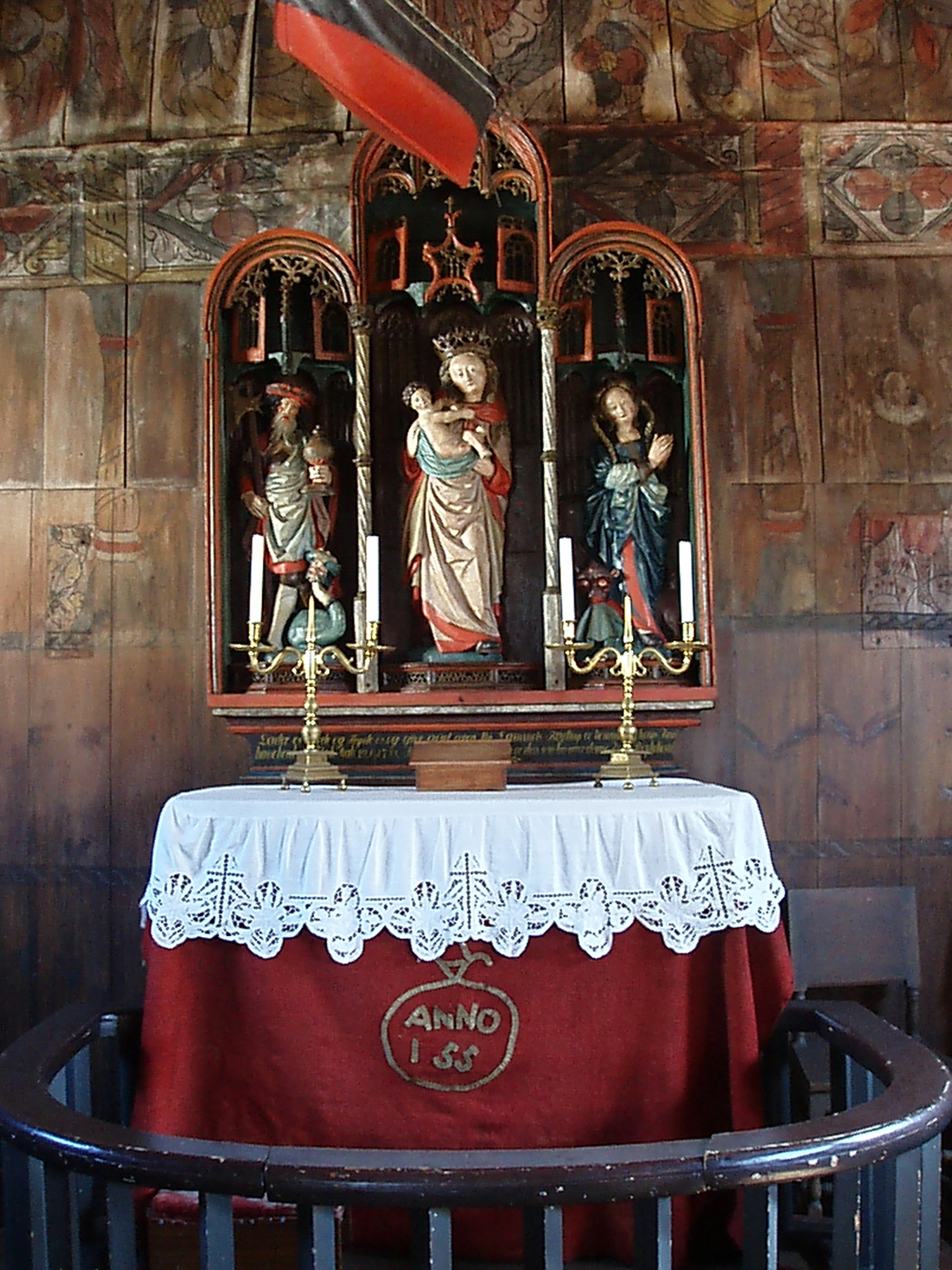
The altar and triptych

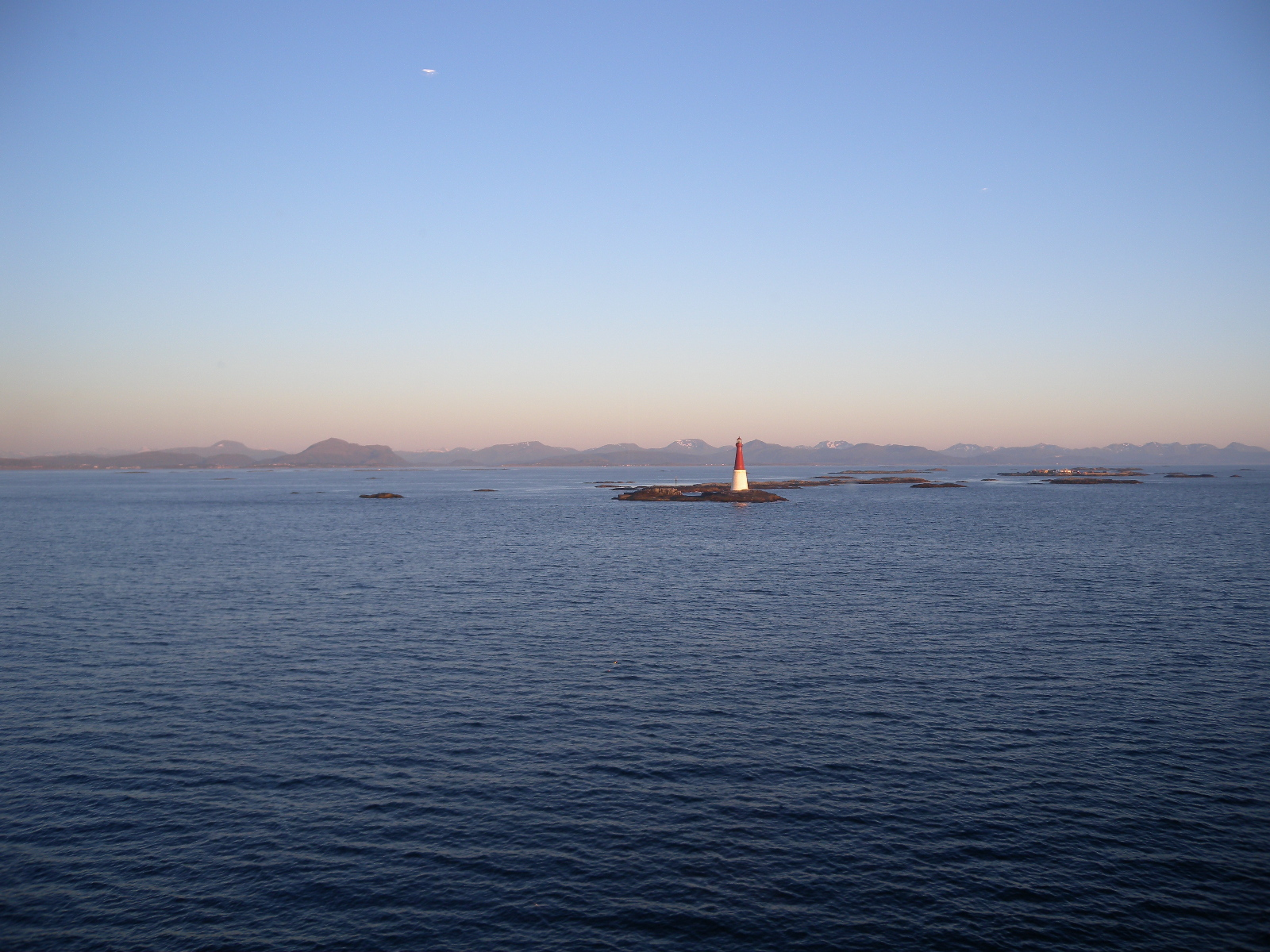
Lighthouse with fishing village in background

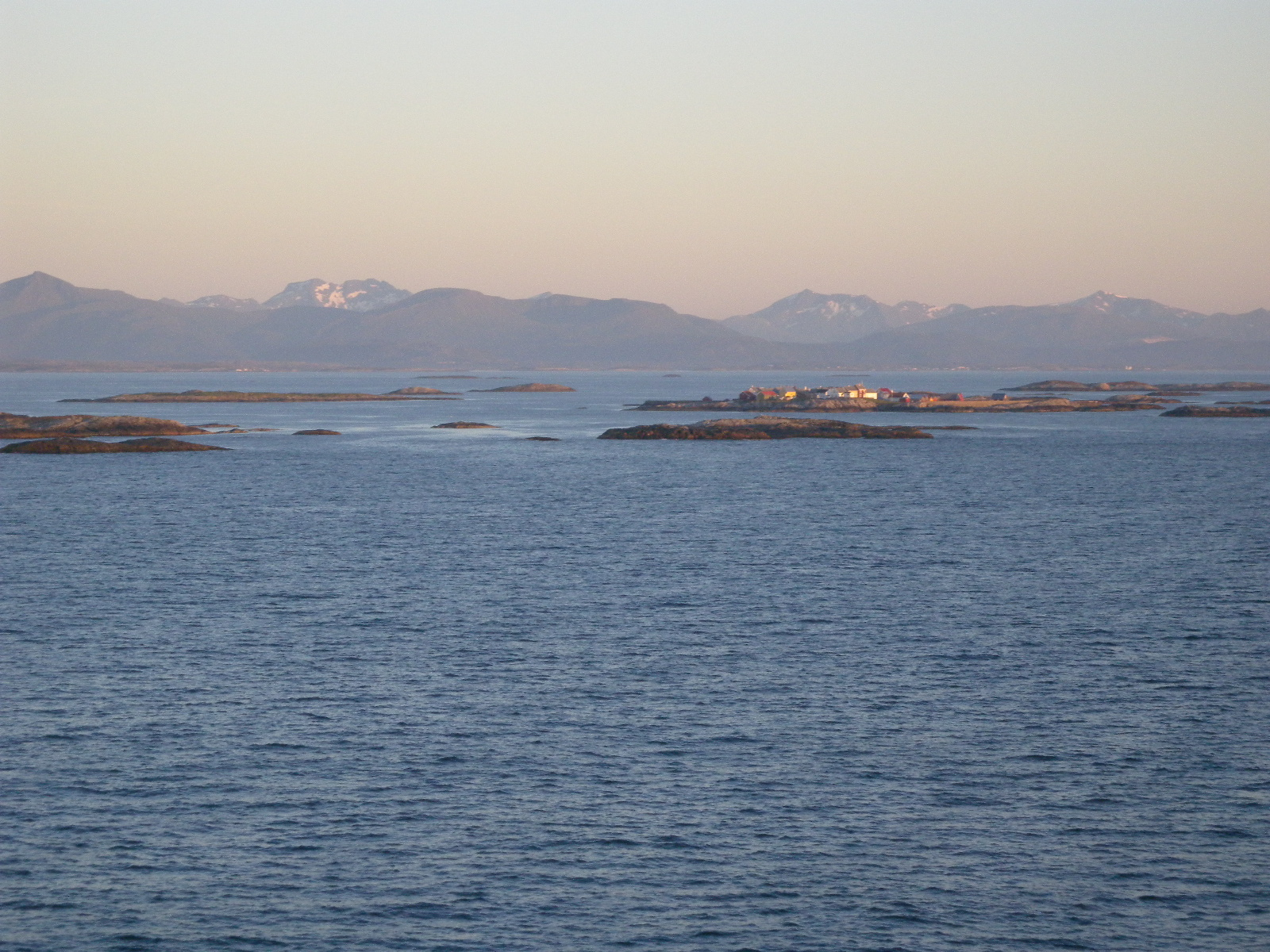
The fishing village

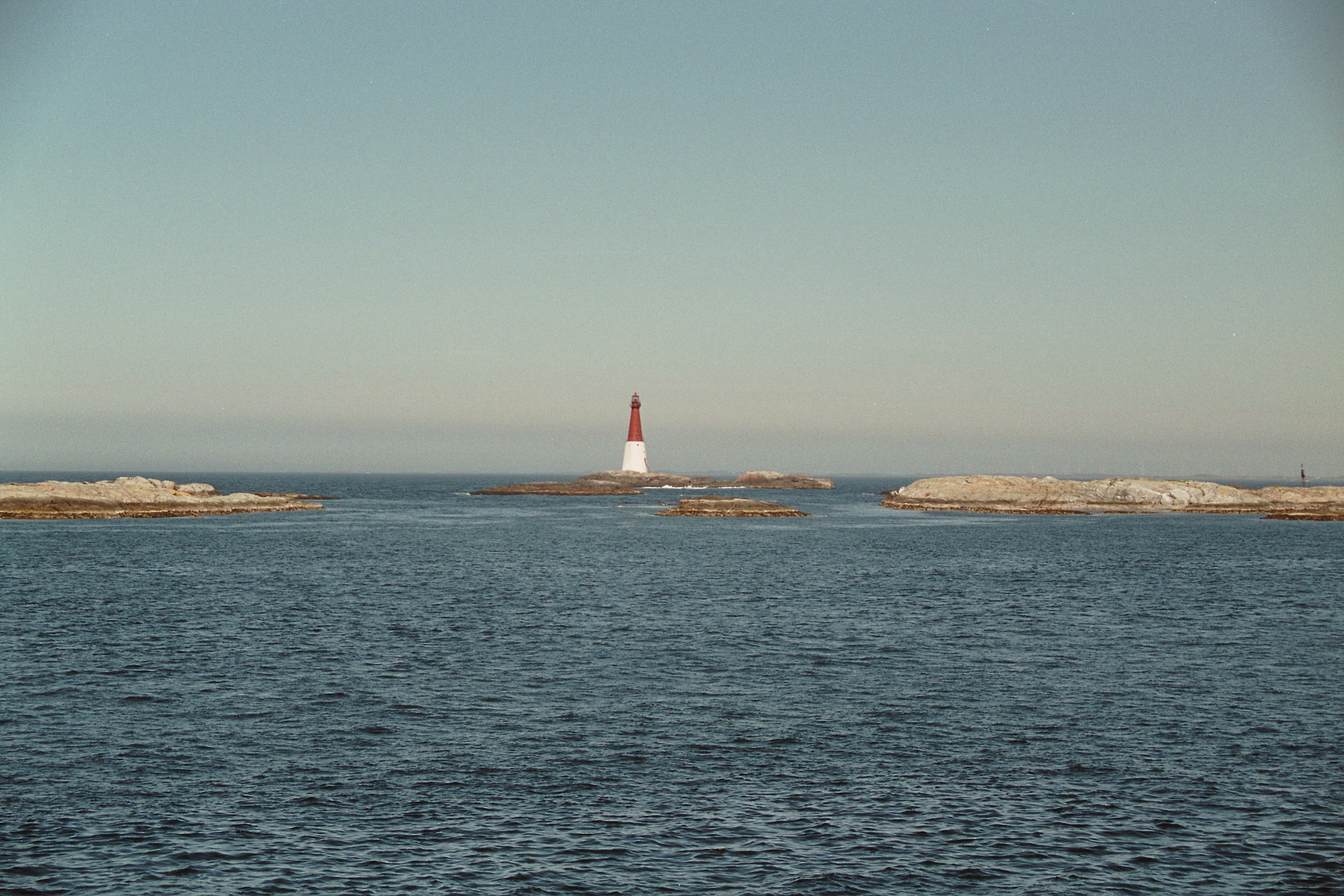
Grip lighthouse

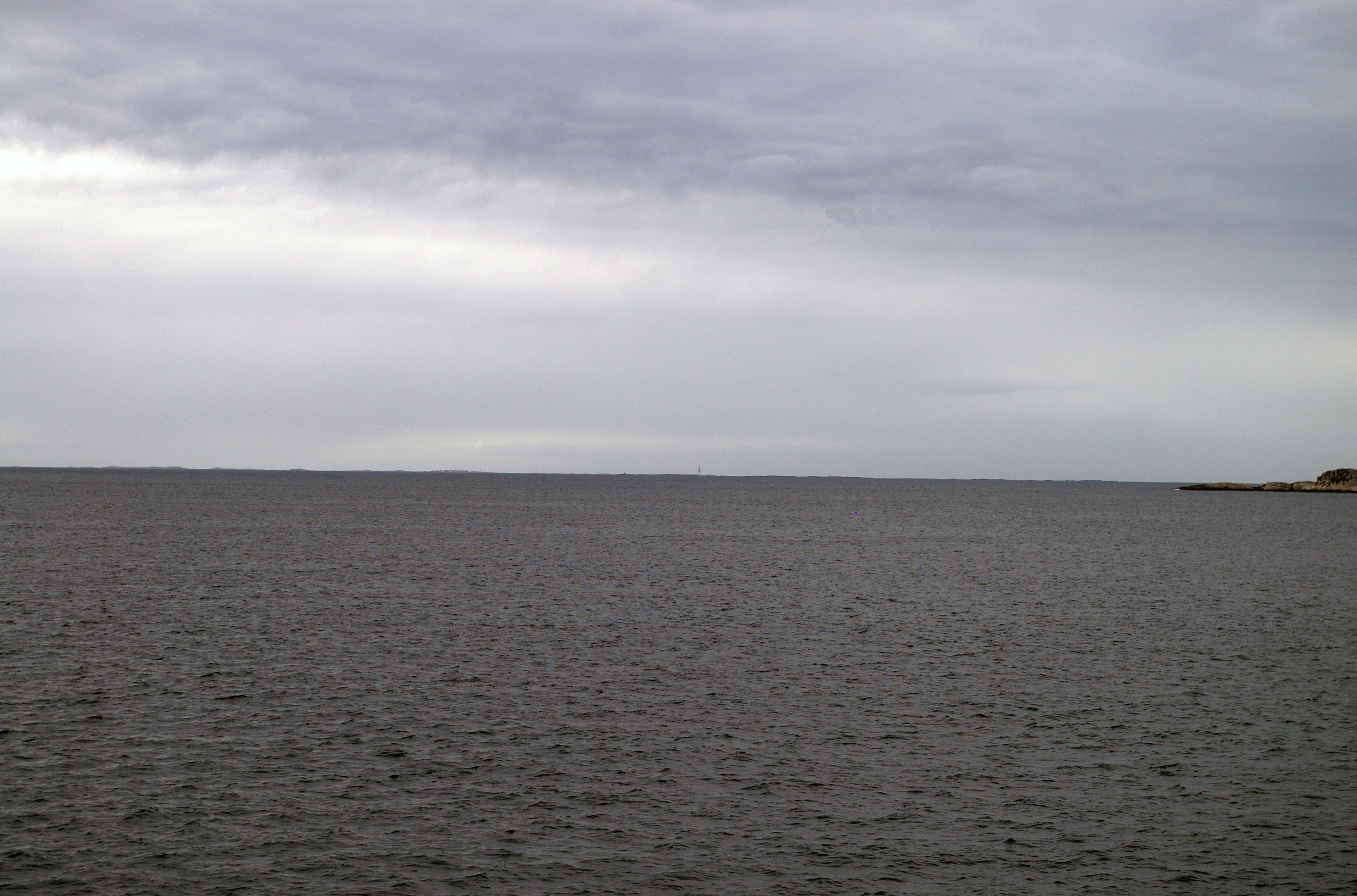
Grip on the horizon seen from neighbour island

== See also ==
- List of former municipalities of Norway
