= LUF =

LUF may refer to:

- Liberala ungdomsförbundet, the Liberal Youth of Sweden
- Living Universe Foundation, an organization that supports ocean and space colonization
- Lowest usable high frequency, a term used for radio transmission
- Luxembourgish franc, the ISO 4217 code for the former currency of Luxembourg

== See also ==
- Loof
