= LFU =

LFU may refer to

- Lacrimal functional unit, primary source of lacritin in the body
- Least frequently used, algorithm
- Lebanese Forces – Executive Command, formerly known as "Lebanese Forces – Uprising"
- LFU 205, monoplane
- Leopold-Franzens-Universität Innsbruck, Austria
