= Grip Lighthouse =

Grip Lighthouse Grip fyrstasjon
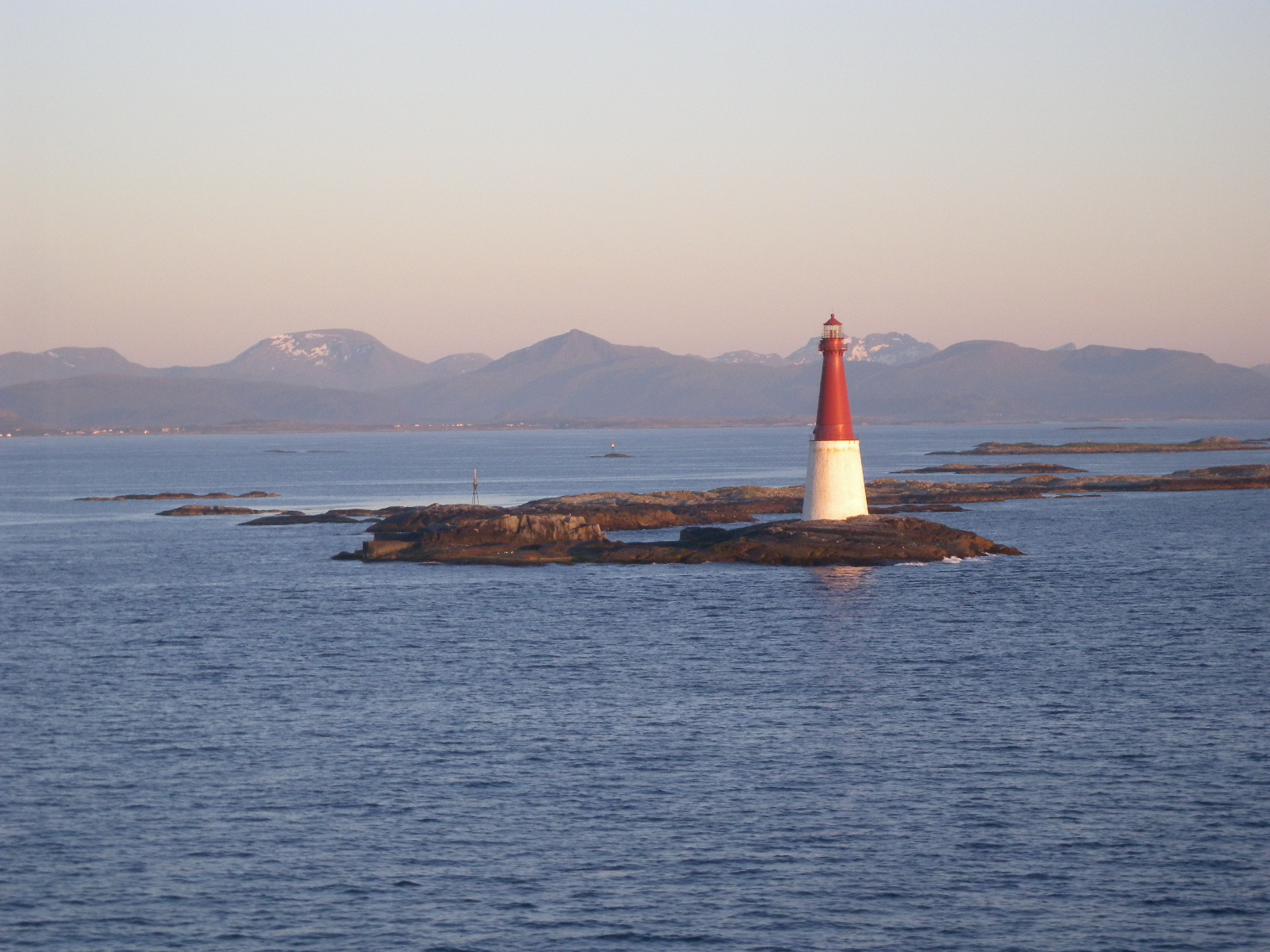
- View of the lighthouse
- Location: Kristiansund Municipality, Norway
- Coordinates: 63°14′01″N 7°36′33″E

Tower
- Constructed: 1885
- Construction: granite (basement), cast iron (tower)
- Automated: 1977
- Height: 44 m (144 ft)
- Shape: truncated cone
- Markings: Red (tower), red (lantern), white (basement)
- Power source: solar power
- Heritage: cultural property
- Racon: G

Light
- First lit: 1888
- Focal height: 47 m (154 ft)
- Range: 17.4 nmi (32.2 km; 20.0 mi) (white)
- Characteristic: Oc(2) WRG 8s

The Grip Lighthouse (Norwegian: Grip fyrstasjon) is located in the Grip archipelago in Kristiansund Municipality in Møre og Romsdal county, Norway. The lighthouse was built between 1885 and 1888 on the 7-metre (23 ft) high islet of Bratthårskollen, north of Gripholmen.

== Description ==
The 44-metre (144 ft) tall lighthouse is a red cast iron tower on a white 16-metre (52 ft) granite stonemasonry base. This is the second tallest lighthouse tower in Norway. The lighthouse's range is 19 nautical miles (35 km; 22 mi), and the white, red, or green light, depending on direction, is occulting every eight seconds.

The islet is barren rock with just the lighthouse tower, a concrete boathouse, and two wharves. The lighthouse keepers lived inside the lighthouse tower. A radio beacon was operated between 1947 and 1986, which was replaced with a frequency-agile racon signalling "G" with a range of 4 nm. The lighthouse was electrified in 1932, and is unmanned since it was automated in 1977. In 2000, it became protected as a cultural heritage site. The pilot station was shut down in 1969.

== See also ==
- Lighthouses in Norway
- List of lighthouses in Norway
