= Loof =

Loof or Lööf (Swedish variant) is a Germanic surname that may refer to:

- Anders Lööf (born 1961), Swedish male curler
- Annie Lööf (born 1983), Swedish politician
- Annika Lööf (born 1966), Swedish female curler
- Augustine Loof (born 1996), Dutch football player
- Dajana Lööf (born 1983), Swedish singer, songwriter and TV-host
- Ernst Loof (1907–1956), German automotive engineer and racing driver
- Fredrik Lööf (born 1969), Swedish sailor
- Jan Lööf (born 1940), Swedish illustrator, author, comic creator, and jazz musician
- Leo Lööf (born 2002), Swedish ice hockey player
- Romain De Loof (born 1941), Belgian cyclist
- Simon Lööf (born 1996), Swedish actor
- Ylva Lööf (born 1958), Swedish actress
- A Spam-like kosher variant of corned beef
