= Man flu =

Non-scientific term purporting a unique male experience of colds and flu

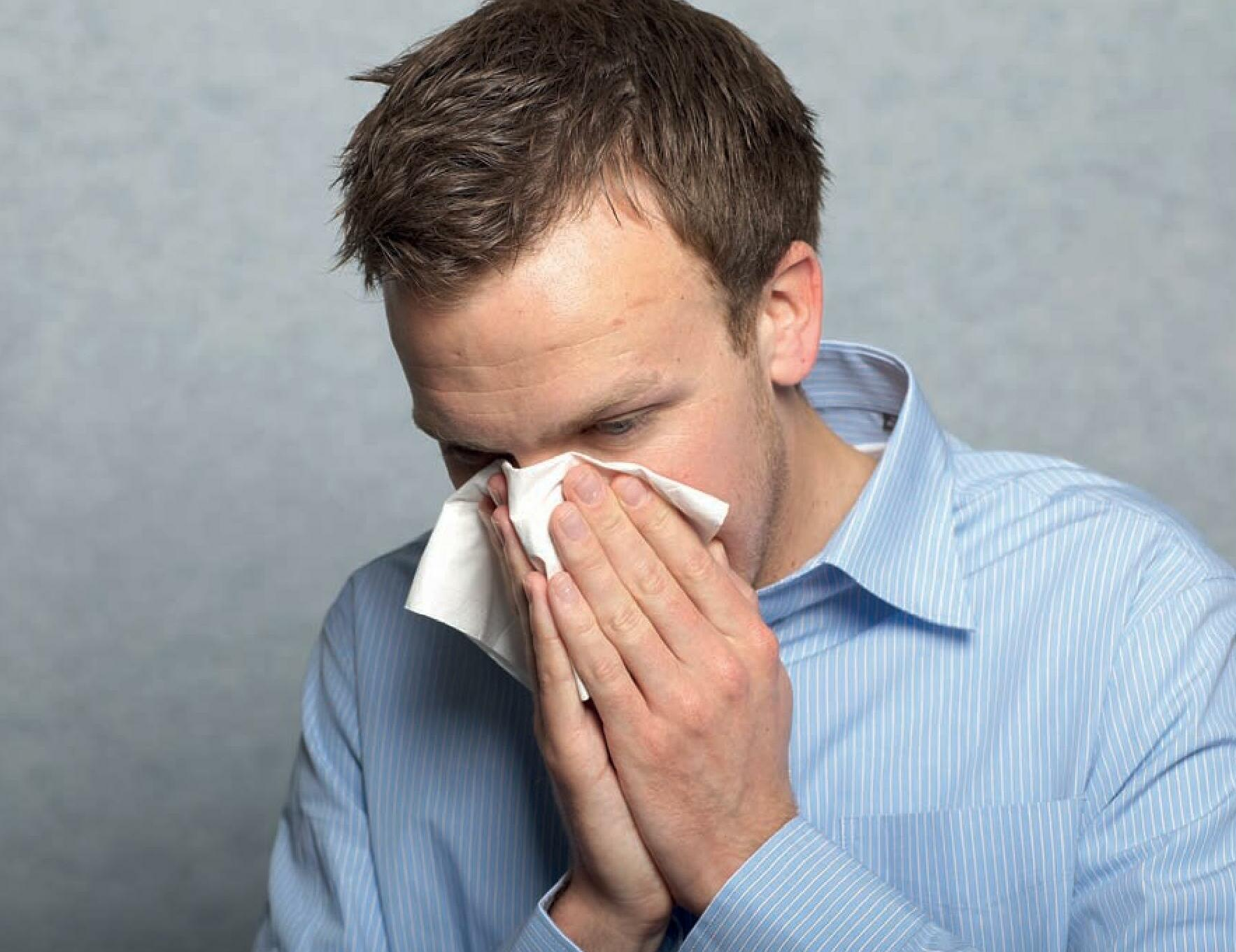
Official Norwegian poster on good habits to prevent influenza

Man flu is a colloquial term referring to the perception that males can experience more severe symptoms when afflicted with the common cold or flu-like illnesses. Originating in Britain, the term has become widespread, and is frequently used in a deprecating manner. Some scientific inquiries verify the existence of a unique response to the flu on the part of males as a constellation of effects, including the negative correlation between testosterone levels and antibody response, while others have argued that the term relies on and perpetuates gender stereotypes that invite ridicule towards men who show weakness or seek help for medical conditions.

== Origins and spread ==
The term man flu is believed to have originated in the 1990s, with the earliest known use found in a message posted on the Usenet newsgroup misc.health.diabetes in 1999, as documented by the Oxford English Dictionary.

An open-access poll featured in Nuts magazine in 2006 brought attention to this notion, although it was widely criticized as unscientific. The poll reported that men reported longer recovery times from flu-like illnesses compared to women, with men taking an average of three days to recover, while women recovered in 1.5 days. A poll conducted for a painkiller manufacturer in 2008 suggested that such exaggeration is just as prevalent in women.

A Boots advertisement featuring the tagline "when he's ill and you don't have time to be – get cold and flu products for just 99p at Boots", which may have been inspired by the concept of 'man flu', was criticized by some for reinforcing gender stereotypes.

== Scientific inquiry ==
Scientific investigation into 'man flu' and its journalistic uptake have been disorderly. Some researchers refute outright the existence of man flu, while one study has suggested substantial evidence for the phenomenon while nevertheless remaining inconclusive on the question of its ultimate existence. Moreover, other scientific studies focused on gender differences in immune responses in contexts either broader than or separate from the flu have been cited in public discussion as evidence of the existence of 'man flu'.

One study, published in 2009, investigated the effects of the bacterium Listeria monocytogenes on genetically modified mice. While the study did not pertain to cold or flu viruses, but rather to a bacterial disease, it gained widespread attention and was misinterpreted by various media outlets, including The Daily Telegraph, as supporting the existence of 'man flu' in humans.

In a study published in the Journal of Psychosomatic Research, researchers affiliated with the University Of Innsbruck found that while women may recover from flu symptoms more quickly than men, a uniquely severe sensitivity to the flu on the part of men does not exist. The researchers also criticized the potential of the term 'man flu' to reinculcate toxic masculinity and discourage men from seeking treatment for the flu. As the researchers summarize:

"... While women showed a tendency to self-report more symptoms, no differences were found in the physician-rated symptom severity. This means that while there is some indication that men might recover more slowly from the disease, based on our data, we would have to reject the popular conception of a male hypersensitivity to ARS. We recognize the importance of evidence-based gender-sensitive medicine to improve diagnostics and treatment in ARS and in medicine in general. In contrast, the pop-cultural portrayal of men as overly weak and hysterical patients when facing a simple flu may hinder men from seeking for appropriate medical treatment because of a fear to be ridiculed. To avoid a culture of toxic masculinity, stereotypical portrayals of gender roles should be avoided. The present study provides some evidence to discard the concept of ‘man flu’. Nevertheless, more research in this field is warranted."

In the Christmas 2017 edition of The BMJ, a review of existing research highlighted significant differences in immune response and outcomes of influenza between men and women. Epidemiological data indicated that men may have a higher risk of hospital admission and mortality from influenza compared to women. Specifically, data from 2004 to 2010 for seasonal influenza in Hong Kong showed a higher risk of hospital admission among adult men, and a US observational study from 1997 to 2007 reported higher rates of influenza-associated deaths among men, even when accounting for factors such as heart disease, cancer, chronic respiratory system disease, and renal disease. Research on influenza vaccination suggested that women may be more responsive to vaccination than men, experiencing more local (skin) and systemic (bodywide) reactions, and exhibiting a better antibody response. Testosterone levels in men were found to potentially play a role in their response to influenza vaccination, with men having the highest levels tending to show a lower antibody response. This lower response may contribute to the possibility that vaccinated men experience more severe symptoms compared to women, as they may not respond to vaccination as effectively. Furthermore, test tube studies of nasal cells infected with influenza revealed that exposure to estradiol reduced the immune response in cells from women but not in cells from men. Treatment with antiestrogen drugs counteracted this effect. Since flu symptoms are largely attributed to the body's immune reaction, a lessened immune response in women may translate to milder symptoms. Despite such findings, this BMJ article, in keeping with the a humorous tone of the journal's Christmas edition, is not intended to imply the existence of man flu.

According to researchers at the University of Cambridge, evolutionary factors may have led women to develop more rigorous immune systems than men due to differing reproductive strategies. In addition, a 2011 study conducted at the University of Queensland suggests that female hormones, such as oestrogens, aid pre-menopausal women in fighting infections, but the protection is lost after menopause.

Research indicates that men are less inclined to seek medical attention when unwell and may underreport symptoms when they do.

== See also ==
- Gender bias in medical diagnosis
- Sex differences in humans
