= Grip, Norway =

Archipelago in Nordmøre, Norway

Grip
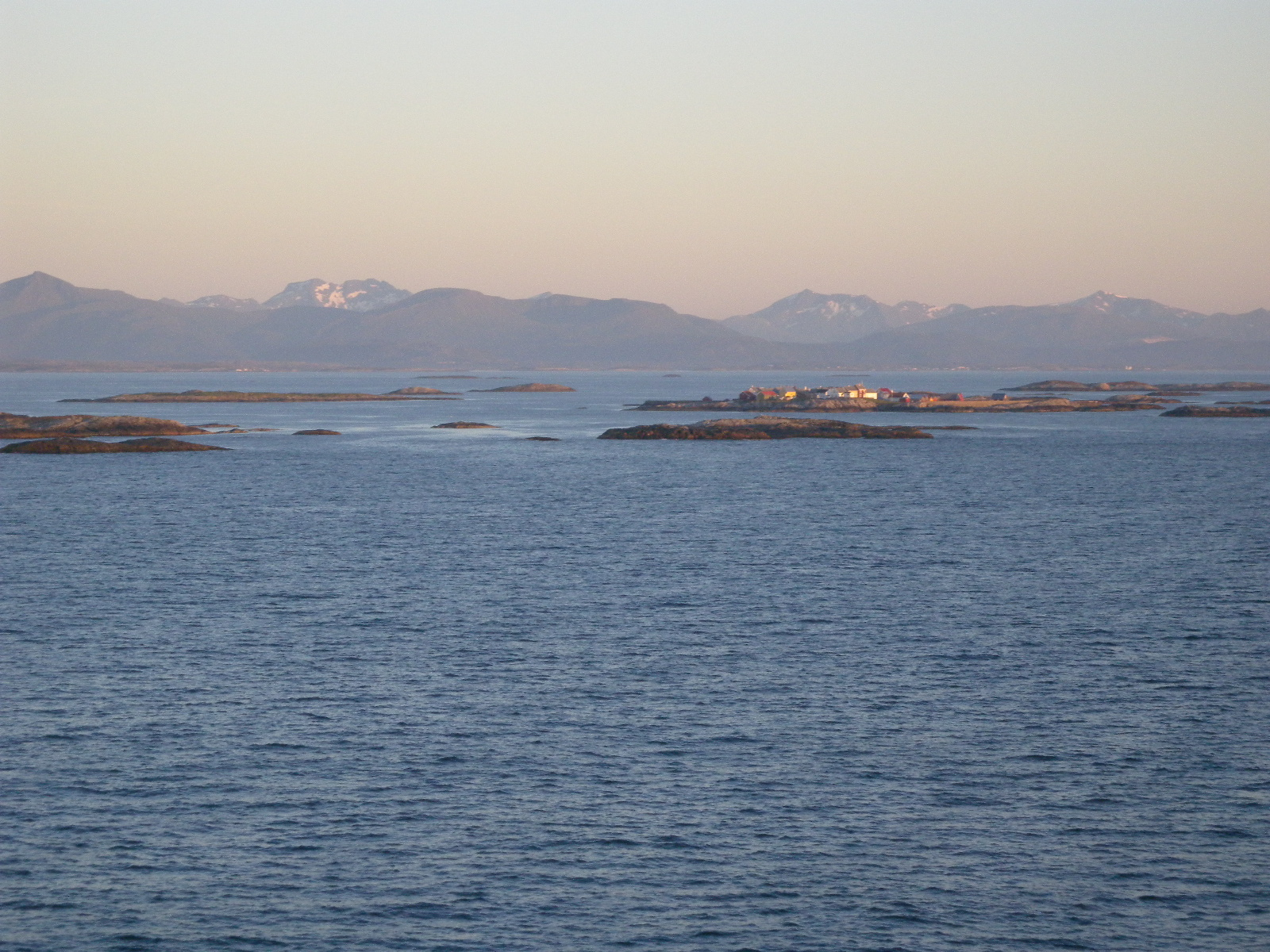
- Interactive map of Grip

Geography
- Location: Møre og Romsdal, Norway
- Coordinates: 63.2195°N 7.5931°E
- Archipelago: Grip

Administration
- Norway
- County: Møre og Romsdal
- Municipality: Kristiansund Municipality

Demographics
- Population: 0 (1974)

Grip (Norwegian pronunciation: [ˈɡriːp]) is an archipelago and deserted fishing village in Kristiansund Municipality in Møre og Romsdal county, Norway. It is located about 14 km (9 mi) northwest of the town of Kristiansund in the Norwegian Sea.

Grip Lighthouse, one of the tallest lighthouses in Norway, is located on one of the islands in the archipelago. The historic Grip Stave Church is located on the main island of Gripholmen. From 1897 until 1964, the islands were part of Grip Municipality, but the islands were merged into Kristiansund Municipality in 1964.

== Archipelago ==
The Grip archipelago consists of 82 islets and skerries about 14 kilometres (8.7 mi) into the Norwegian Sea northwest off the town of Kristiansund. The fishing village of Grip (no permanent residents) is located on Gripholmen, which is the largest and only habitable islet. On the south side of the fishing village is the main harbor, protected by two breakwaters. The older and northern harbour is smaller and less protected. Other breakwaters protects the fishing village from large ocean waves. The highest point is just 10 metres (33 ft) above mean sea level.

The Inngripan group of skerries lies about 3 kilometres (1.9 mi) closer to Kristiansund, where a small storm shelter offered protection for shipwrecked fishermen. The storm shelter has recently been restored.

Since all the turf and vegetation on Gripholmen was removed to provide clean cliffs for drying cod there was little room for agriculture. Only a few tiny gardens remained. The inhabitants could keep one or two cows grazing on the nearby islet of Grønningen, and a few hens and pigs. After being depopulated in 1974, the islands are slowly revegetating.

== Fishing village ==
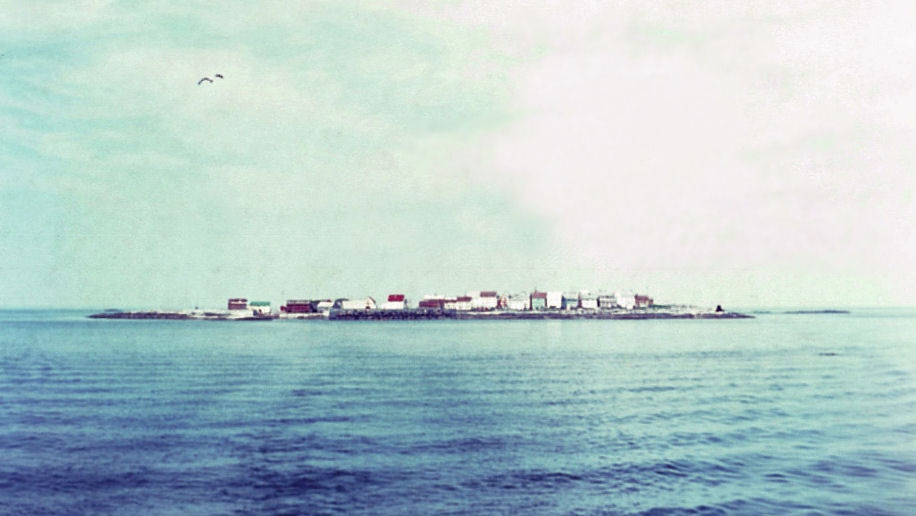
An islet with a village (1967)

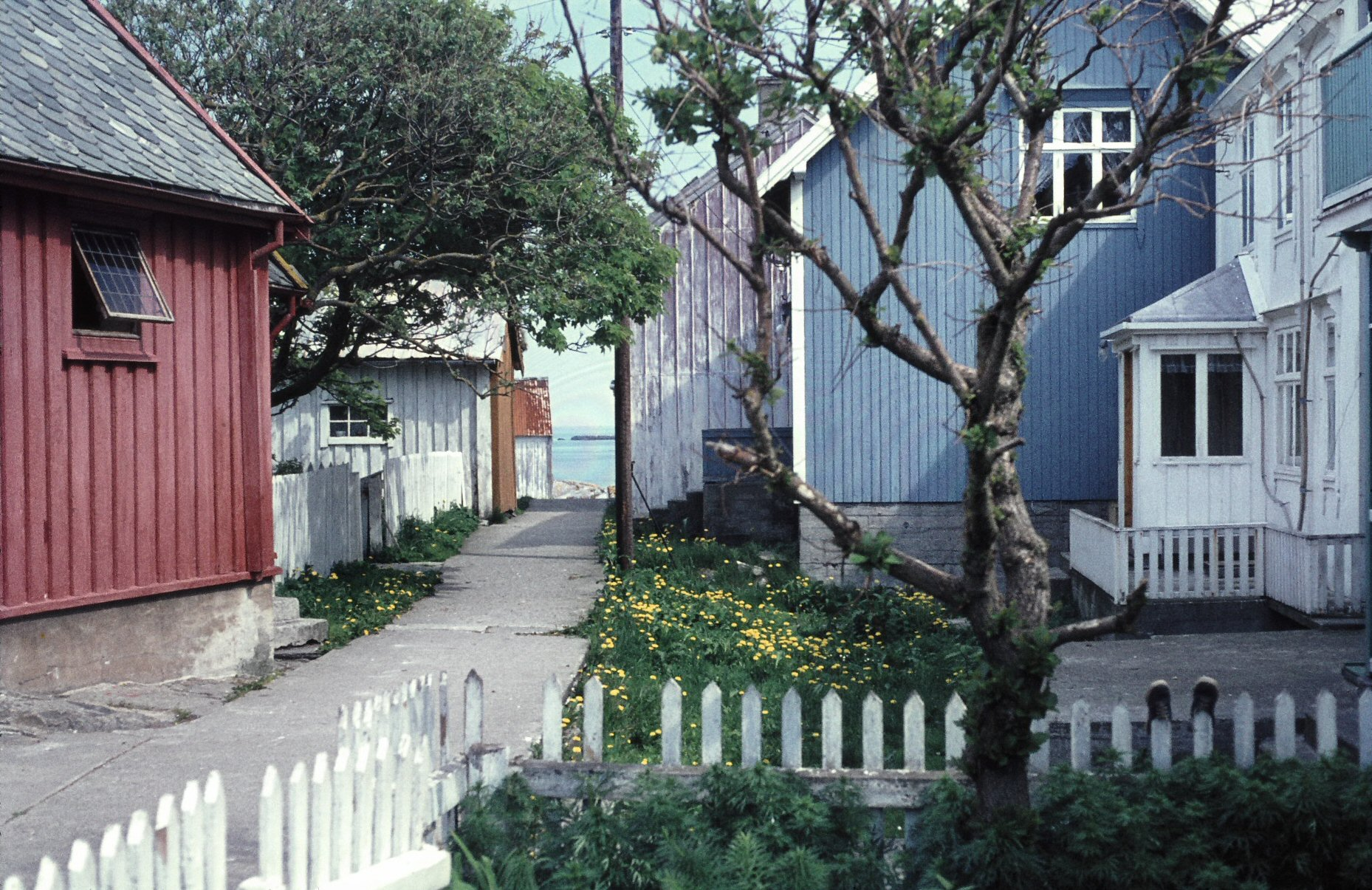
From the fishing village (1967)

The first indications of settlement at Grip is from the ninth century, where fishermen settled close to the fishing grounds. Grip might because of that, be the oldest settlement in the Nordmøre district. Exports of fish from Norwegian fishing villages became important during the monopoly of the Hanseatic League. The Grip Stave Church is thought to have been constructed around 1470. The village belonged to the archbishop of Norway until the protestant reformation in 1537, when king Christian III seized all church properties in Norway.

Merchant Hans Horneman in Trondheim bought the islet from King Frederick IV in 1728 and the fishermen and their families became, in effect, vassals. The fishermen had to sell the catch to the merchants at a price decided by them later. This arrangement lasted until it was forbidden in 1893. The merchants, becoming landlords, also bought most of the private properties.

Storm surges destroyed most of the fishing village in 1796 and again in 1804, leaving only the church and a few other houses. The first breakwaters were constructed in 1882 and a harbor capable of landing small ships was not ready until 1950. The new harbour provided excessive materials which were used to create a small football pitch.

The population fluctuated for centuries, following the profitability of fishing, between 100 and 400 people. A now deserted village, it was once a busy place, when 2,000 fishermen could stay there during the height of the fishing season, when fishermen rowed and sailed to Grip from all over, to catch cod. Centralization led to a declining population after World War II, and Grip became deserted in 1974 when Hildur and Kasper Larsen left just before Christmas.

After being deserted, the old houses have become popular summer houses, and in the summer Grip has 150-250 residents in 44 housing units, primarily the earlier population and their descendants in Kristiansund. The harbour is still a popular dock for small fishing vessels, and the village is a popular destination for tourism in Kristiansund.

Beginning in 1895, public transportation between Grip and Kristiansund was established by steamship and in the period from 1914 to 1972 by motorboat. Today a passenger ferry connects Grip to Kristiansund in the summer season with one or two 30-minute crossings from the town centre every day.

When the diesel generator was started in 1950, the population was supplied with electric energy. The summer residents now get their electricity from 7:00 in the morning to 11:00 at night with two generators installed in the local power station, totaling 210 kVA power. The power station was privatized in 1992. The archipelago has mobile phone coverage from a radio tower in Kristiansund. There is no natural source of fresh water, so the residents collect rainwater, flush the toilets with seawater, and travel to town to do their laundry.

Infrared cameras with a complete view of the village are monitored from the fire station in Kristiansund as fire protection. In 2011, the world's smallest fire truck was delivered, and the summer residents were trained in operating the equipment.

The old schoolhouse has been turned into an inn and post office, and one of the boathouses in the harbour and the temperance movement's lodge serves as community houses.

== Etymology ==
The name is first recorded in 1338 as "Gripar" (Old Norse: Grípar) which is a plural form of the word (which makes sense since Grip is an archipelago). The etymology of the name is uncertain, but it is maybe related to the Norse verb grípa which means "catch", "seize", or "grip". If this is the case, then it probably refers to the catching of fish here.

== Media gallery ==
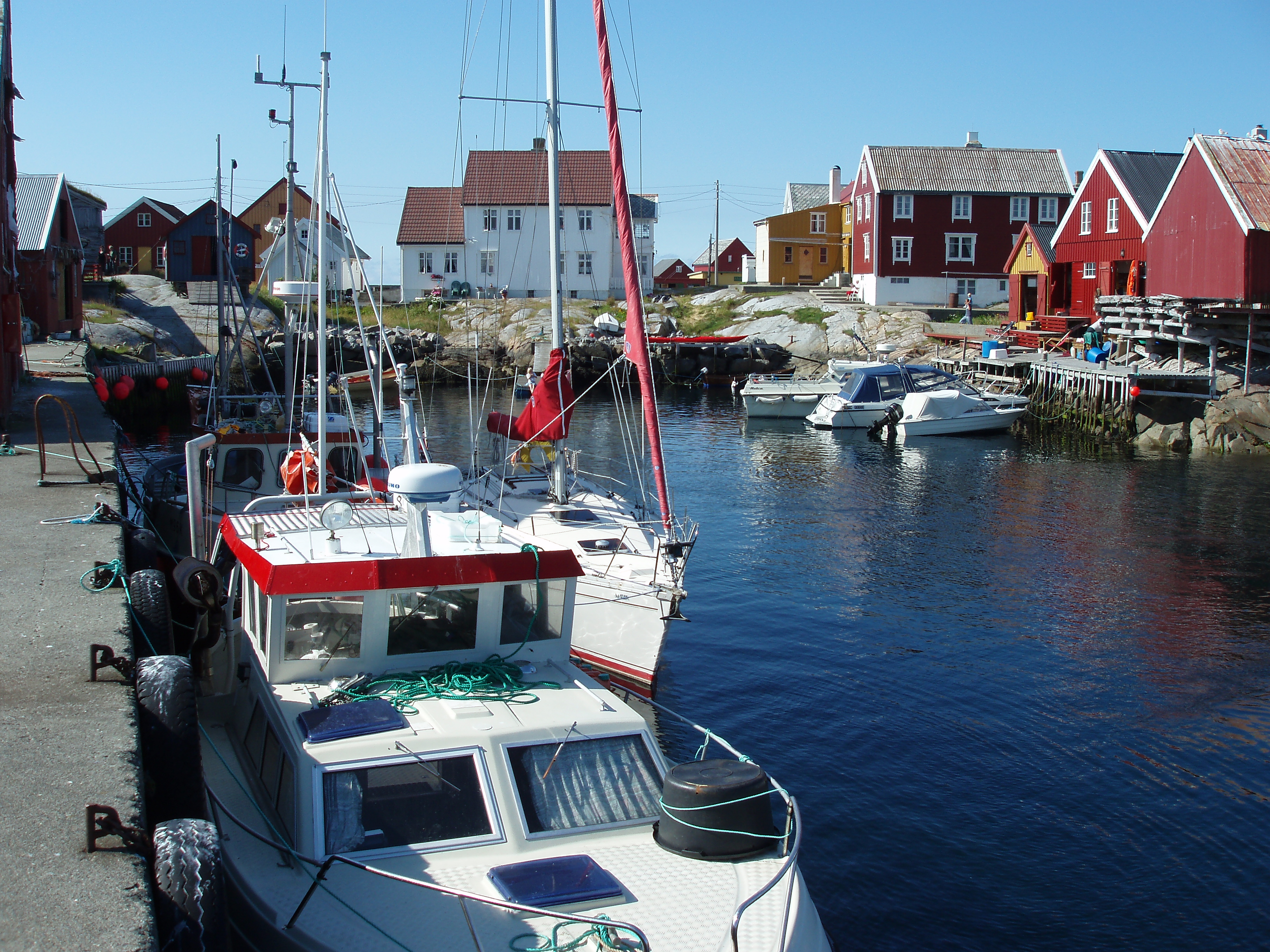
The south harbour

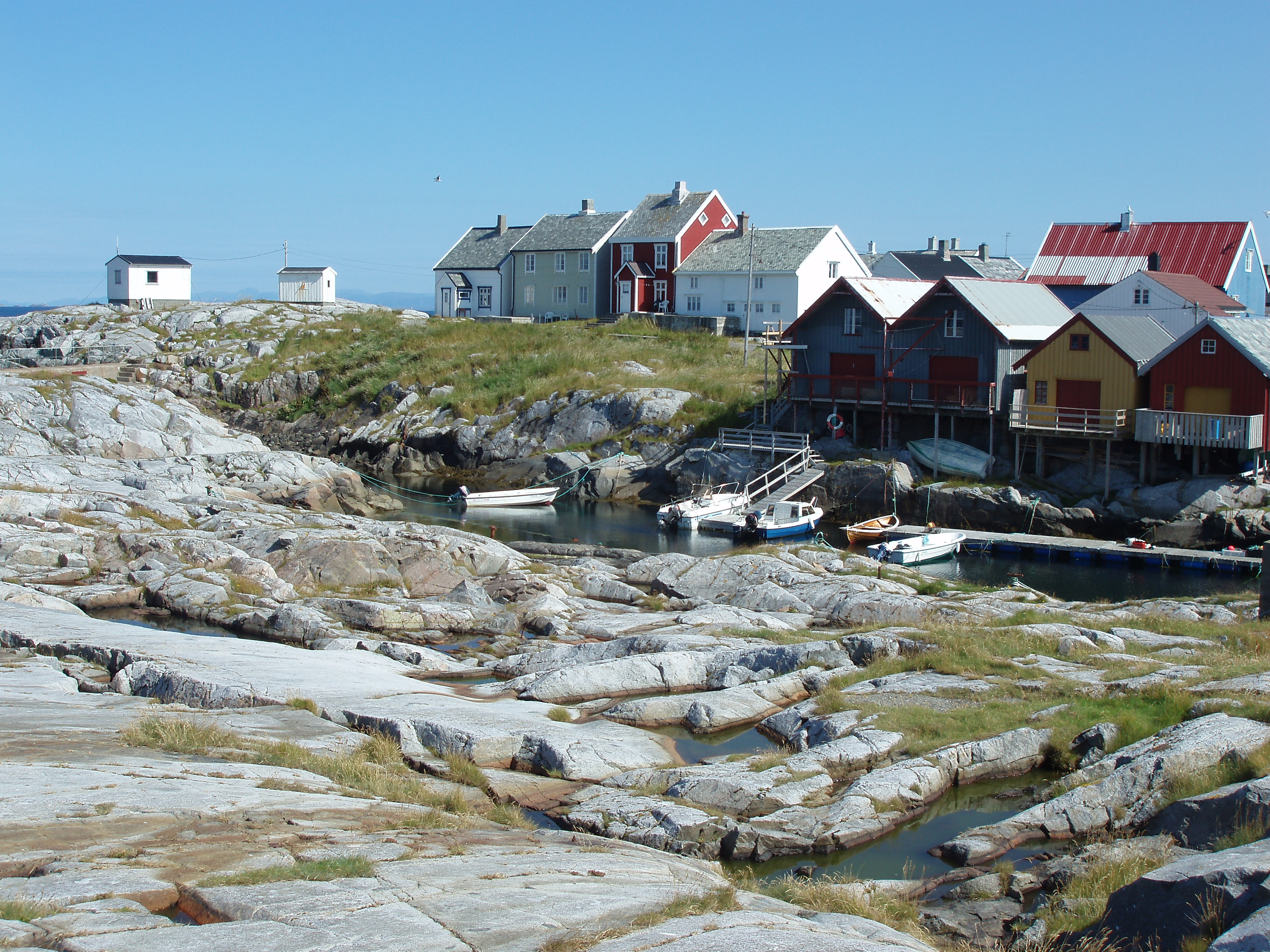
Houses on the north side

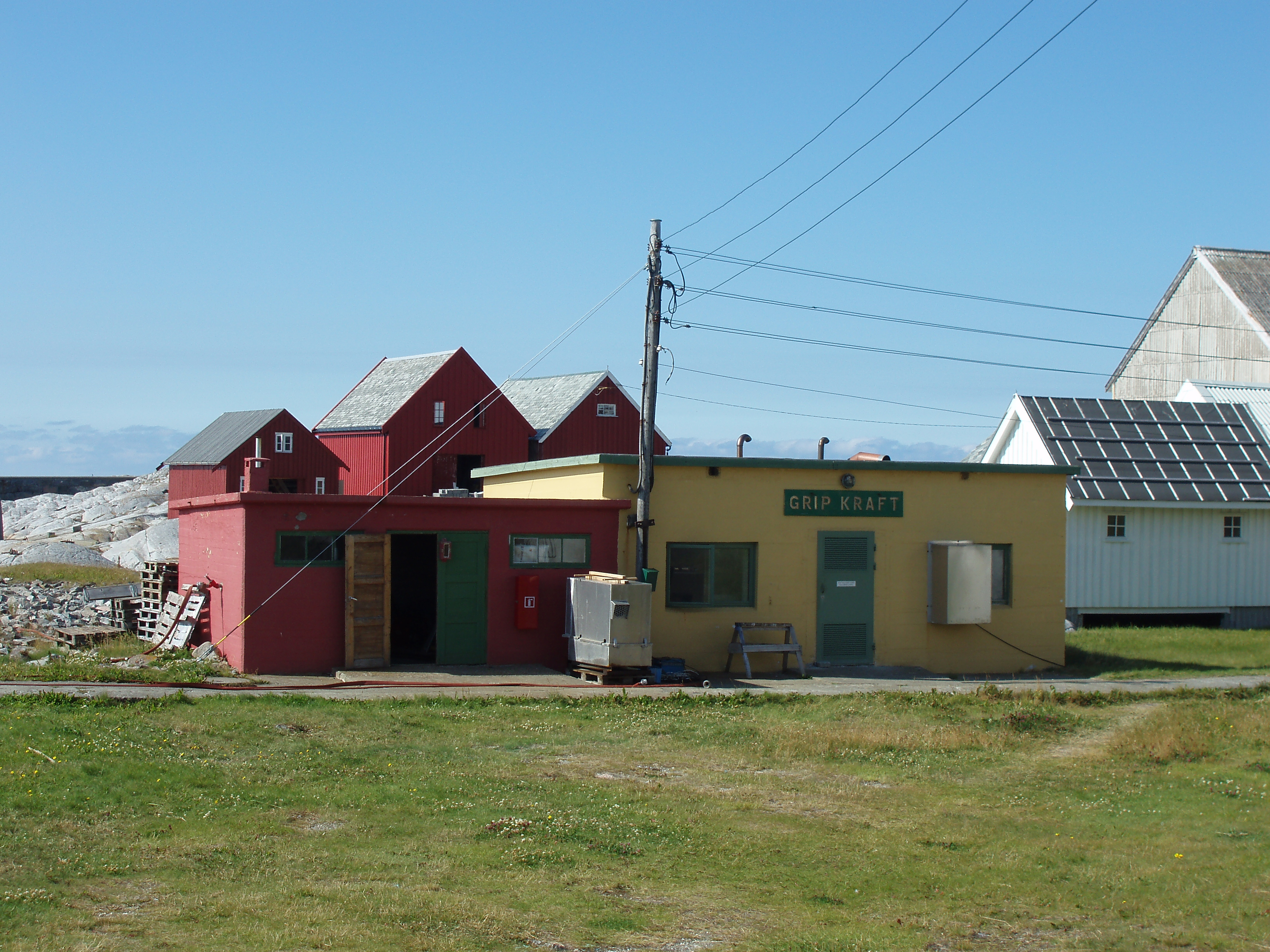
Grip power station

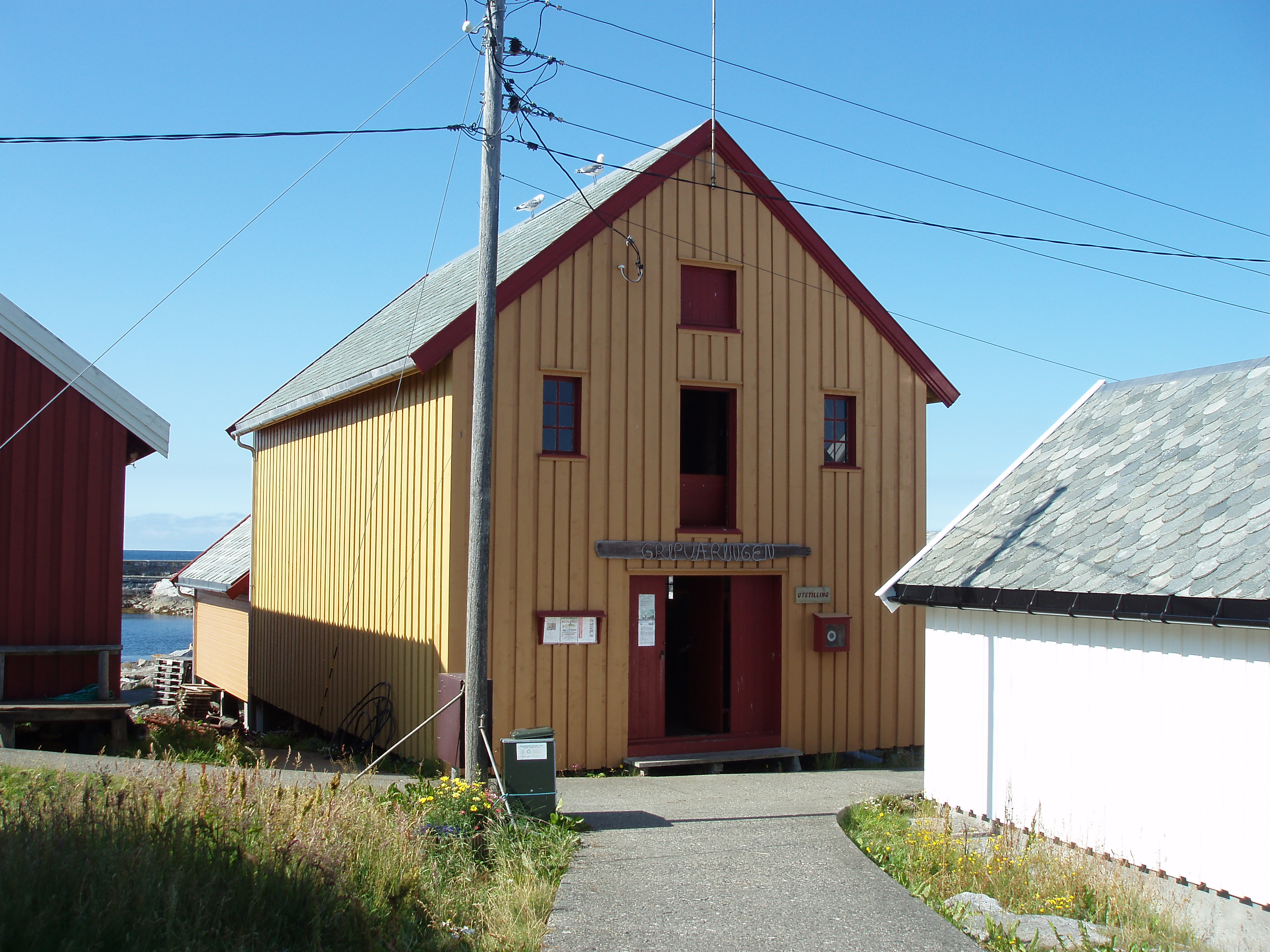
The community house

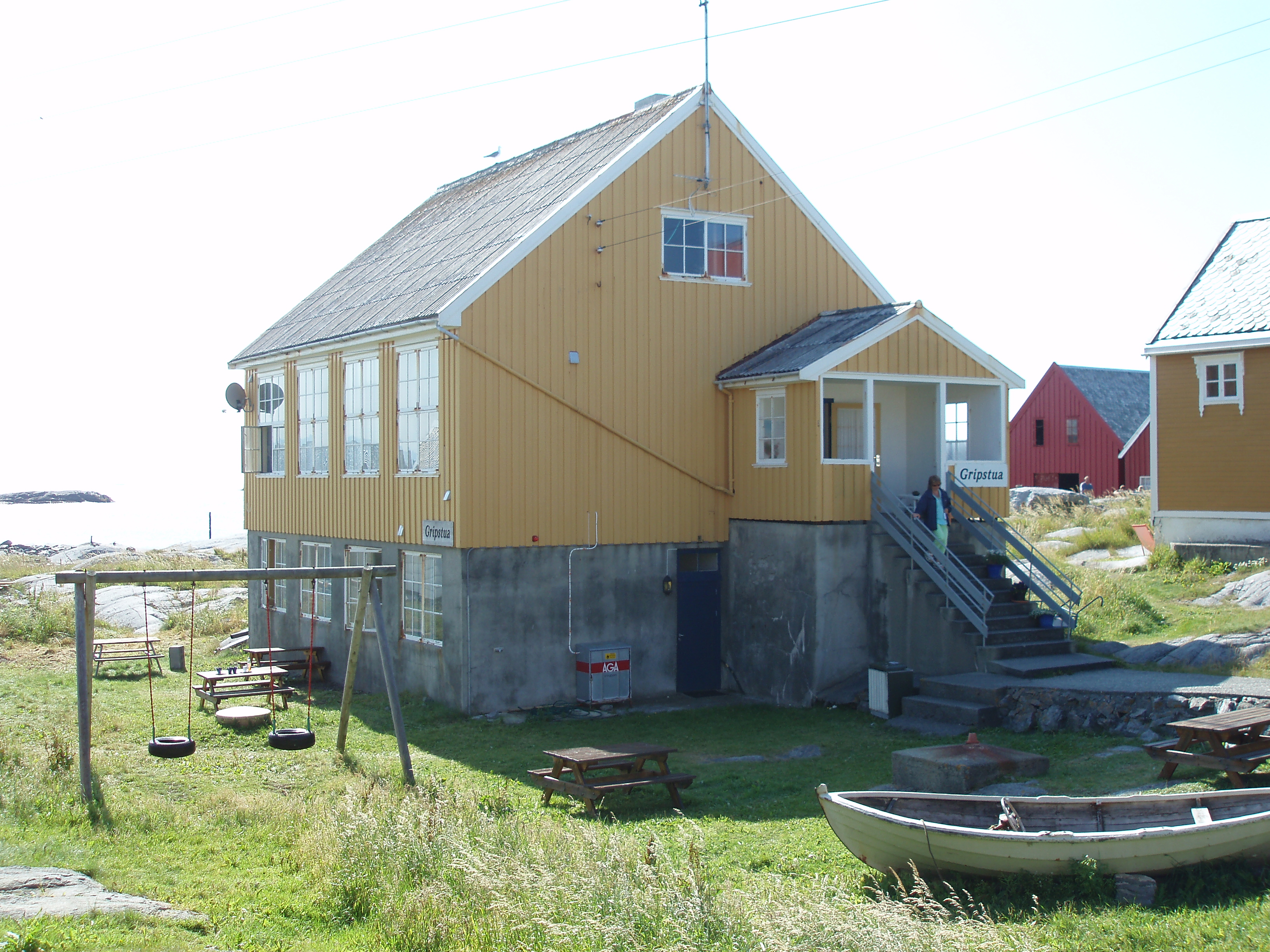
The schoolhouse inn

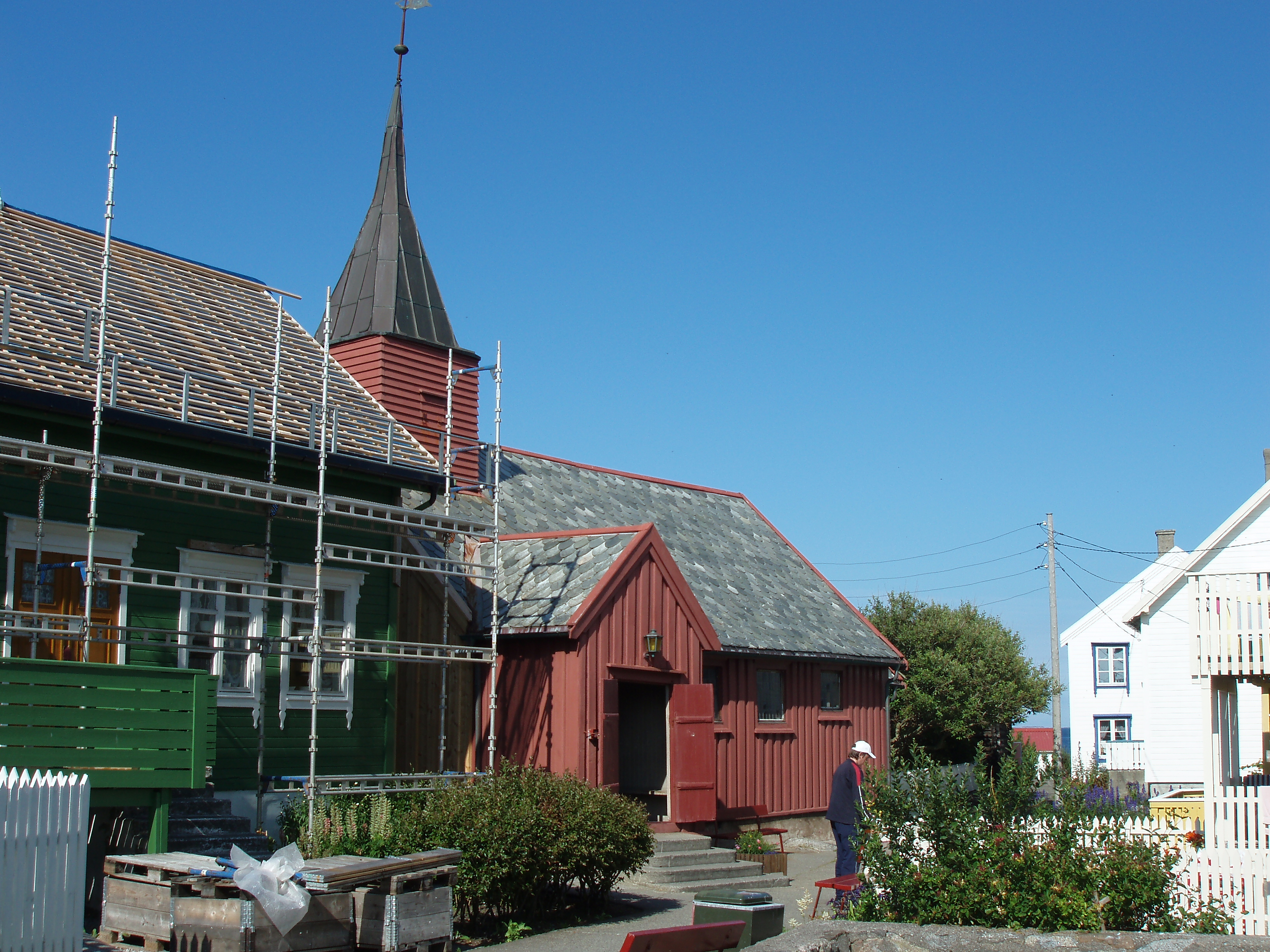
Grip Stave Church

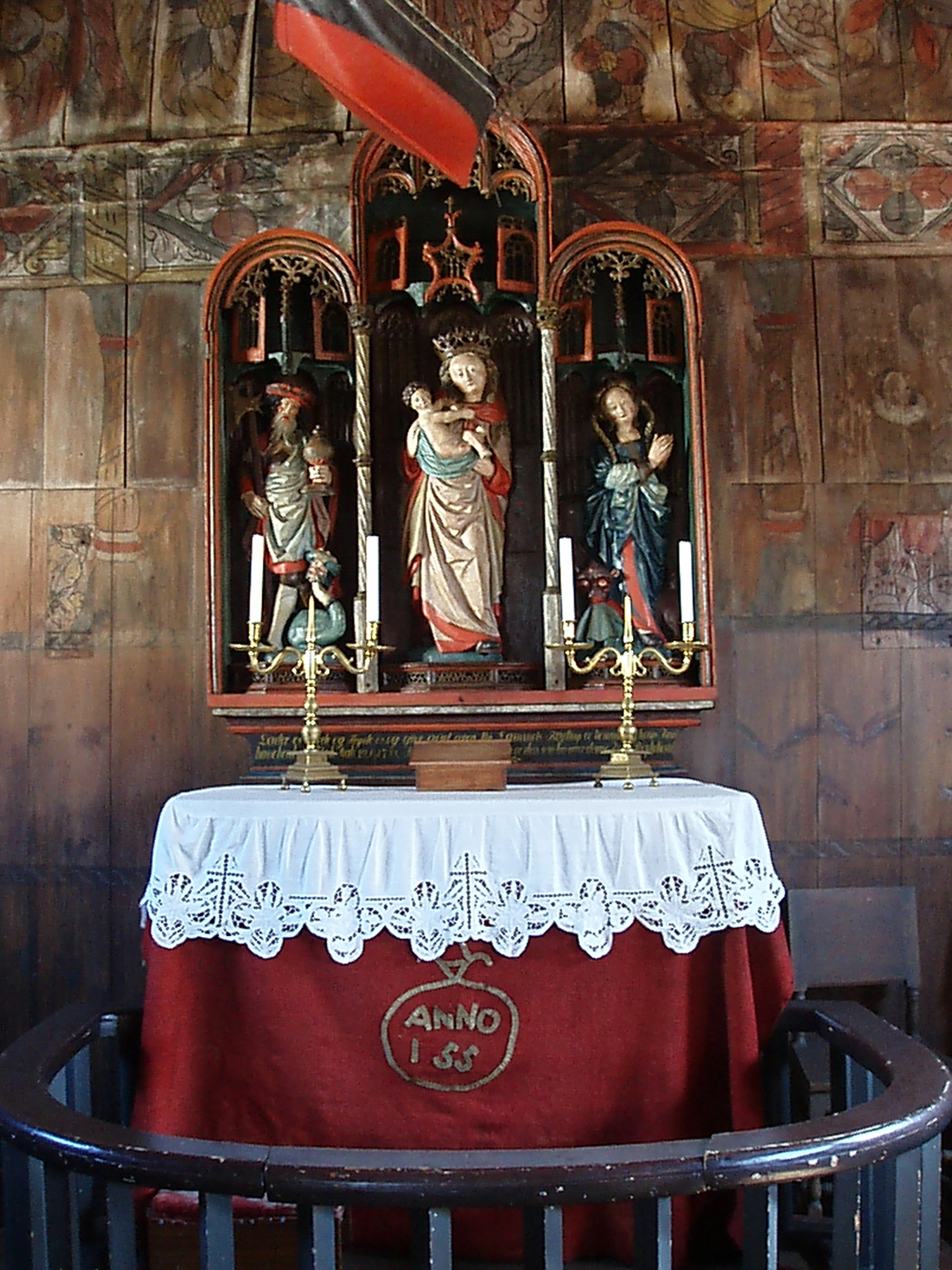
The altar and triptych

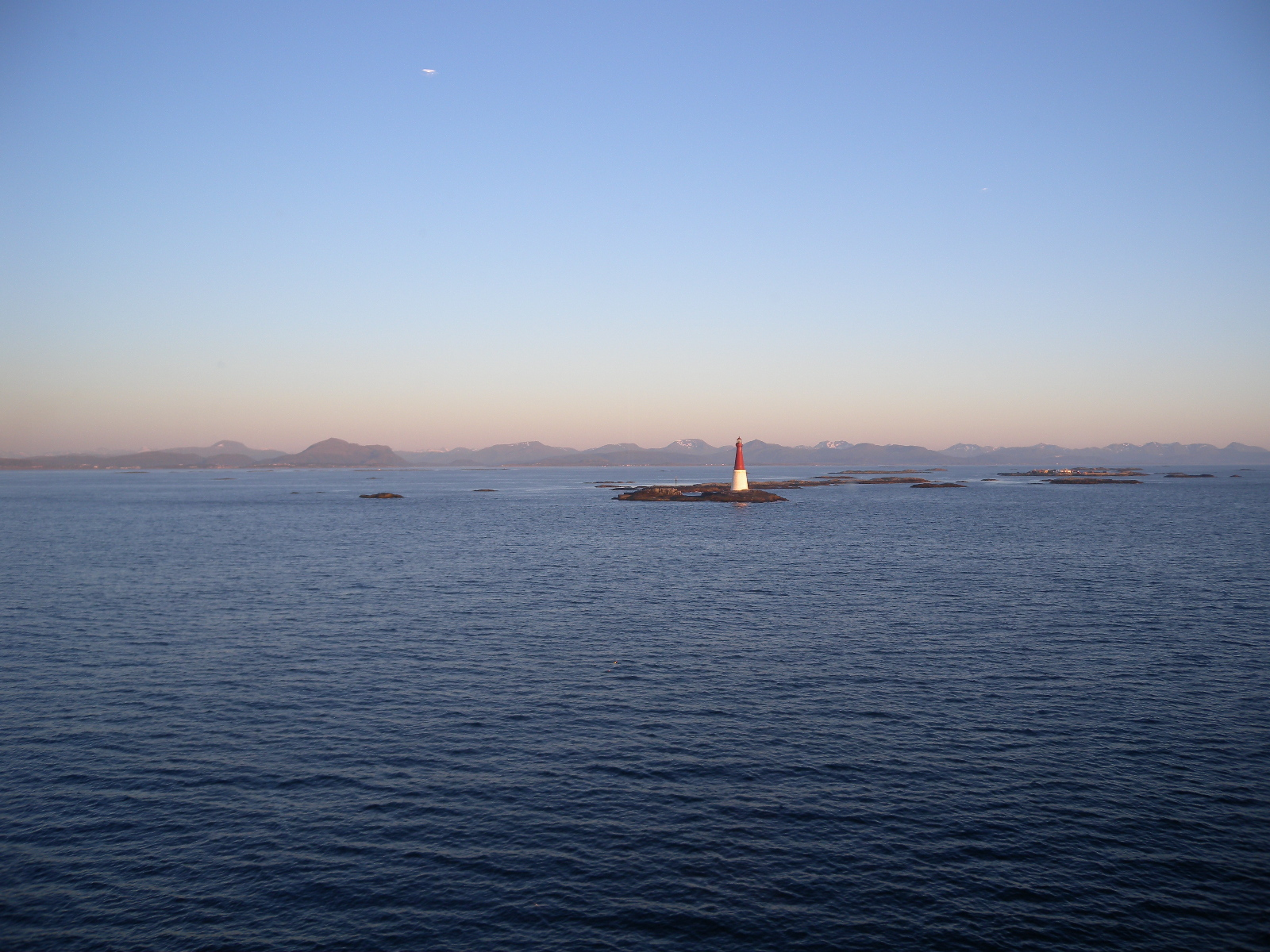
Lighthouse with fishing village in background

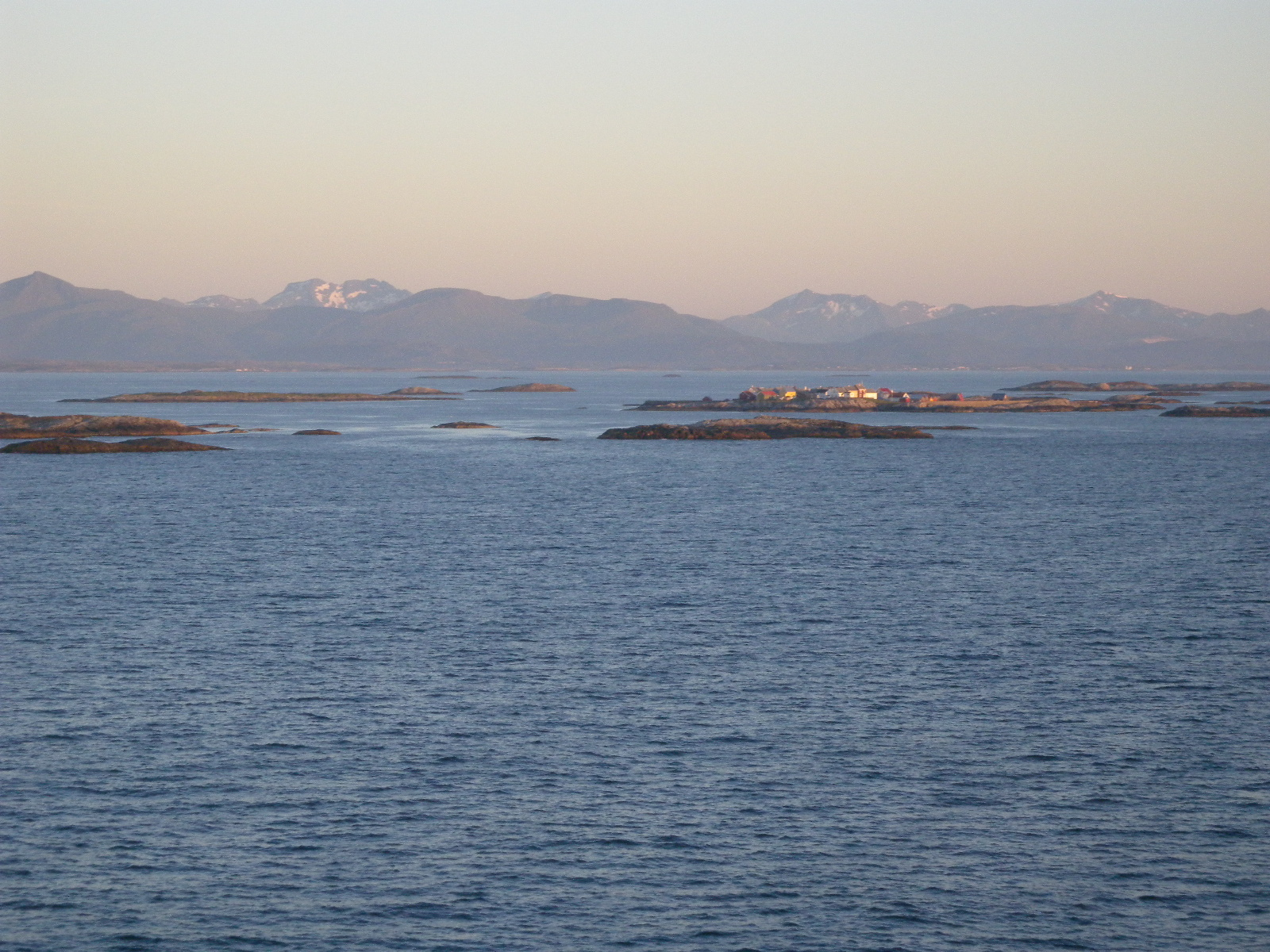
The fishing village

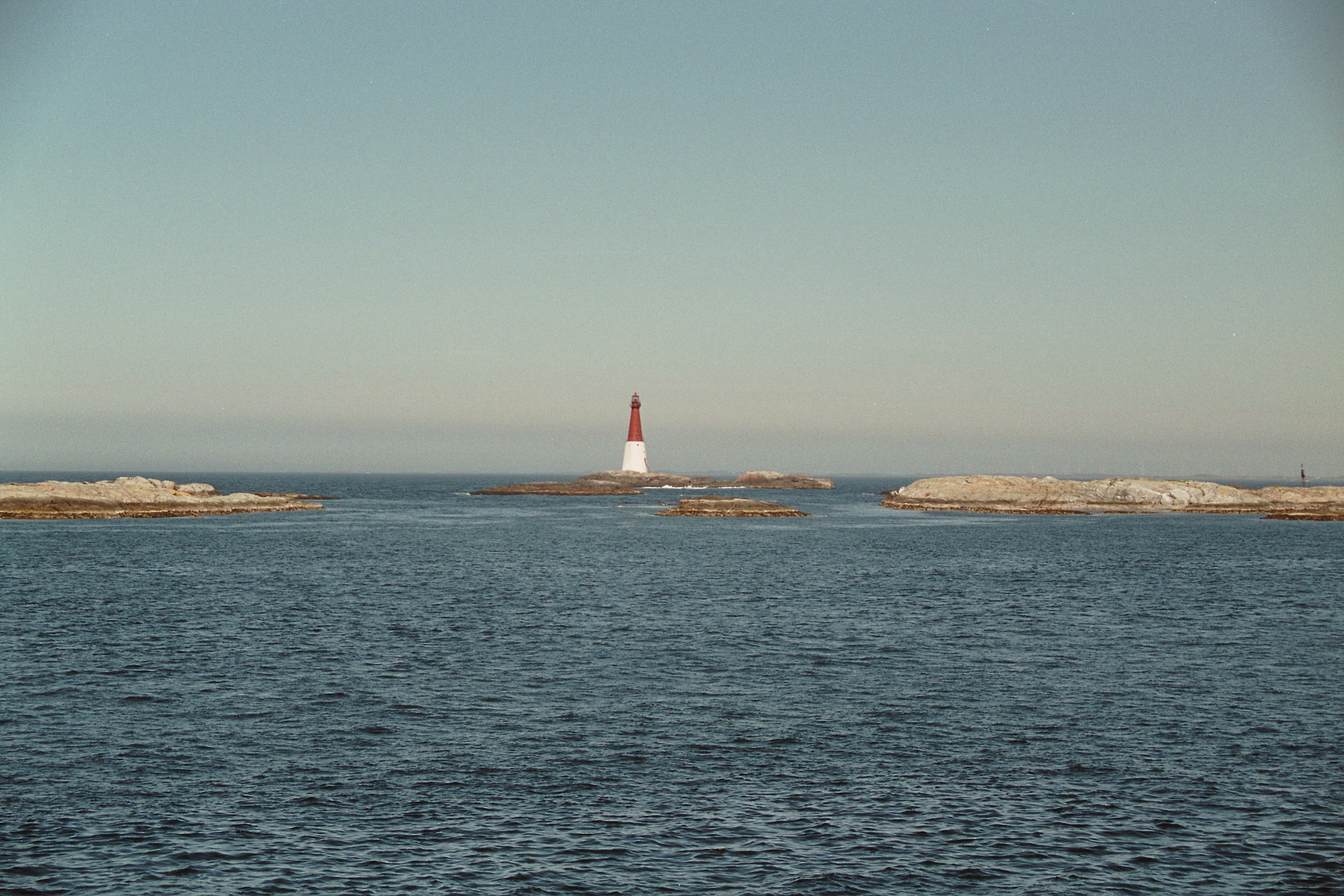
Grip lighthouse

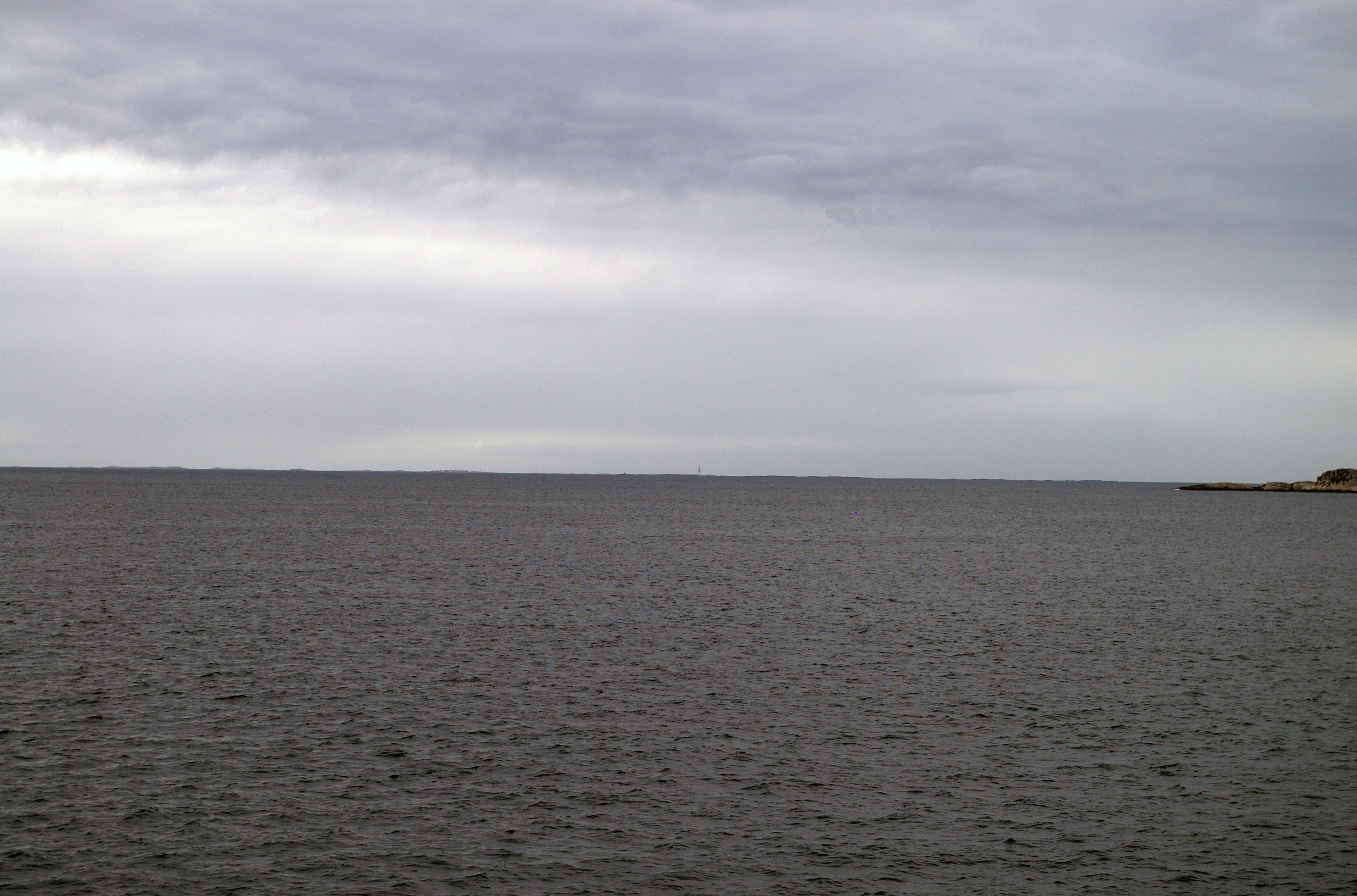
Grip on the horizon seen from neighbour island
