= Grip Stave Church =

Church in Møre og Romsdal, Norway

- Grip stavkyrkje
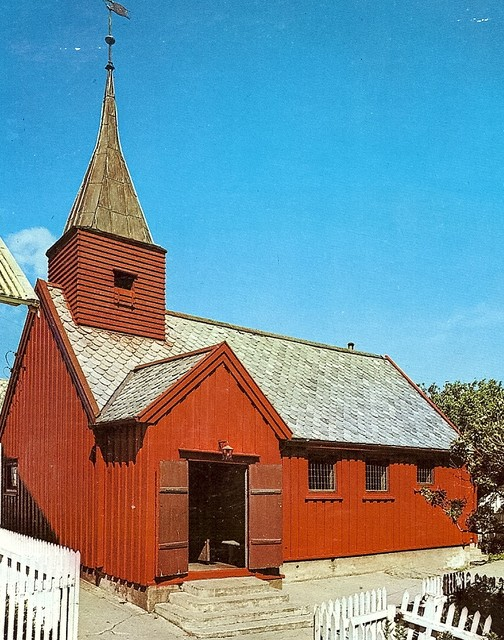
- View of the church
- Grip Stave Church
- 63°13′11″N 7°35′38″E
- Location: Kristiansund, Møre og Romsdal
- Country: Norway
- Denomination: Church of Norway
- Previous denomination: Catholic Church
- Churchmanship: Evangelical Lutheran

History
- Status: Parish church
- Founded: c. 1470
- Consecrated: c. 1470

Architecture
- Functional status: Preserved (Used in summer)
- Architectural type: Møre type stave church
- Completed: c. 1470 (556 years ago)

Specifications
- Materials: Wood

Administration
- Diocese: Møre bispedømme
- Deanery: Ytre Nordmøre prosti
- Parish: Kristiansund
- Norwegian Cultural Heritage Site
- Type: Church
- Status: Automatically protected
- ID: 84428

Grip Stave Church (Norwegian: Grip stavkyrkje) is a historic parish church of the Church of Norway in Kristiansund Municipality in Møre og Romsdal county, Norway. It is located in the now-abandoned fishing village of Grip on the small island of Grip about 14 kilometres (8.7 mi) northwest of the town of Kristiansund. It is an annex church for the Kristiansund parish which is part of the Ytre Nordmøre prosti (deanery) in the Diocese of Møre. The white, wooden church was built in a rectangular stave church style in 1470 by an unknown architect.

With only one nave that is 12 metres (39 ft) long, 6.5 metres (21 ft) wide, and 6 metres (20 ft) high, it is one of Norway's smallest churches. The priest no longer lived in the parish after the year 1635, but regularly visited the island. Grip has been an annex to the Kristiansund church parish since 1967. The church is also one of the most remote of the existing stave churches in Norway since it sits on a small island about 12 kilometres (7.5 mi) off the mainland coast.

Located in a now-abandoned fishing village, the church is only used in the summer season, when both summer residents and tourists attend worship services every third Sunday, led by a priest from Kristiansund.

== History ==
The church was built in around the year 1470 at the island's highest point, about 8 metres (26 ft) above sea level. The church is a Møre type stave church, being structurally similar to the larger Kvernes and Rødven stave churches. Because of the barren nature of the island, there is no cemetery on the church grounds, and bodies had to be buried elsewhere, such as in the cemetery of Bremsnes Church, over 10 kilometres (6.2 mi) away over open sea. In 1621, the church underwent major modifications when portions of the walls were rebuilt and a flèche was added.

In 1814, this church served as an election church (Norwegian: valgkirke). Together with more than 300 other parish churches across Norway, it was a polling station for elections to the 1814 Norwegian Constituent Assembly which wrote the Constitution of Norway. This was Norway's first national elections. Each church parish was a constituency that elected people called "electors" who later met together in each county to elect the representatives for the assembly that was to meet at Eidsvoll Manor later that year.

New windows were installed in the 1870s, and at the same time both a weaponhouse and a sacristy were added. During restoration work in 1933 led by John Tverdahl, a new foundation was added and the exterior walls were panelled. Today, most of the walls and roof are still original to the stave church. A 1972 proposal to relocate the church did not materialize. In 2007, the roof and spire were restored and some of the paneling was replaced.

== Interior ==
=== Altar ===
The altar is a triptych from Utrecht in the Netherlands, dated to about 1520, with a central sculpture of the Blessed Virgin Mary, flanked by sculptures of Saint Olaf of Norway and Saint Margaret the Virgin, locally known as St. Maret.

According to legend, the triptych is one of five altars donated to Norwegian churches by princess Isabella of Austria after being escorted by Erik Valkendorf, Archbishop of Norway, in terrible weather en route to her wedding in Copenhagen with the Danish king Christian II in 1515. Other altars were donated to Kinn Church, Leka Church, Hadsel Church, and Røst Church. The five altars are referred to by art historians as the Leka group. Four of the altars have survived intact to this day, but Grip has the only complete altar in the original church.

Despite having sculptures of three saints, the altar survived the Protestant Reformation of Norway in 1537. The altar was restored in 2002.

=== Organ ===
A new pipe organ from the Netherlands with 270 wooden pipes was donated in 2006, which due to humid weather conditions will only be installed in the church during the summer season. The rest of the year, the organ is in use in Kirkelandet Church.

=== Art ===
The church also has a small altar cup from 1320, a 16th-century double-sided painting on canvas, murals from the 1621 modifications, and two votive ships.

== Gallery ==
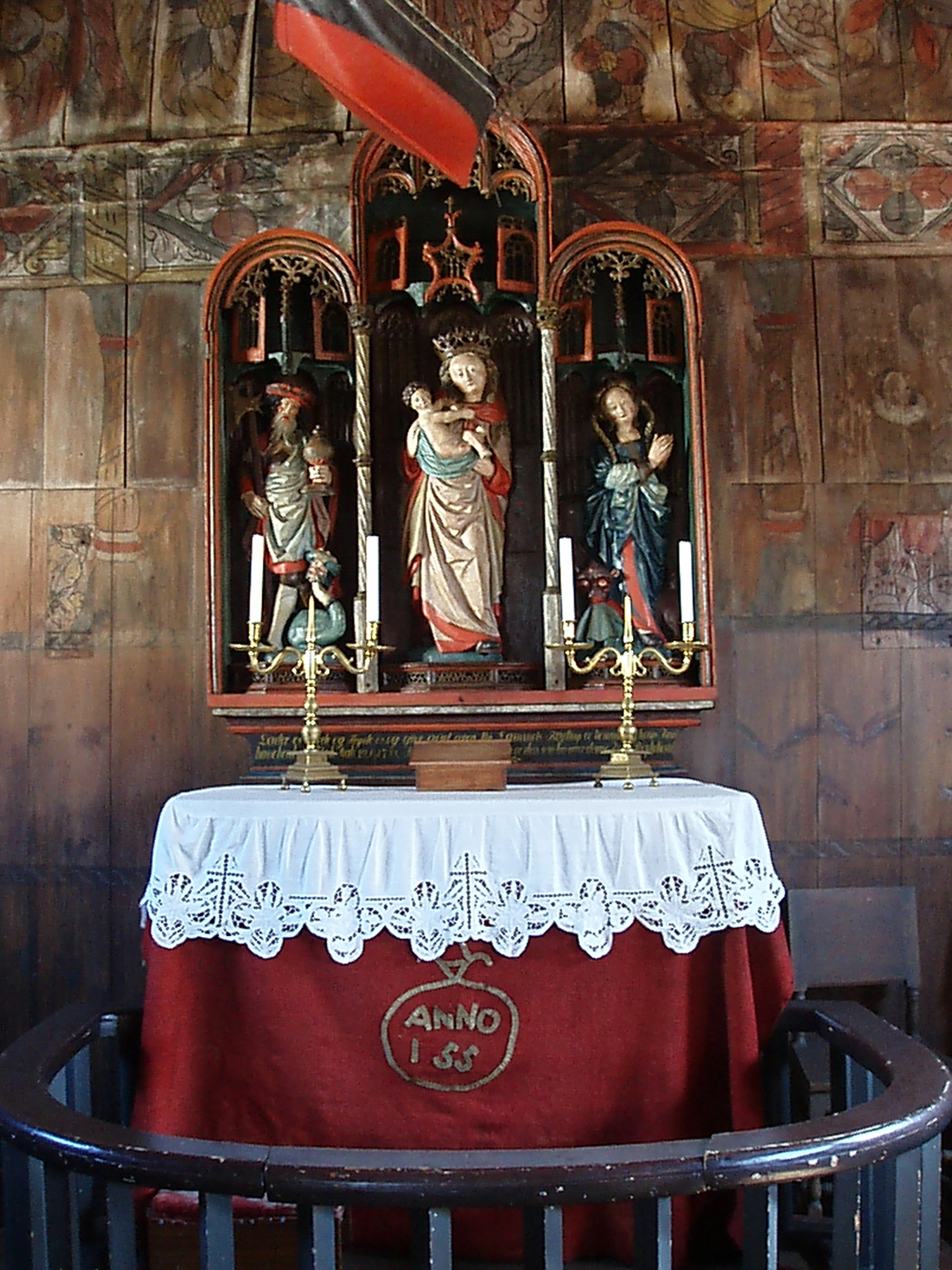
Altar with triptych and the hull of a votive ship

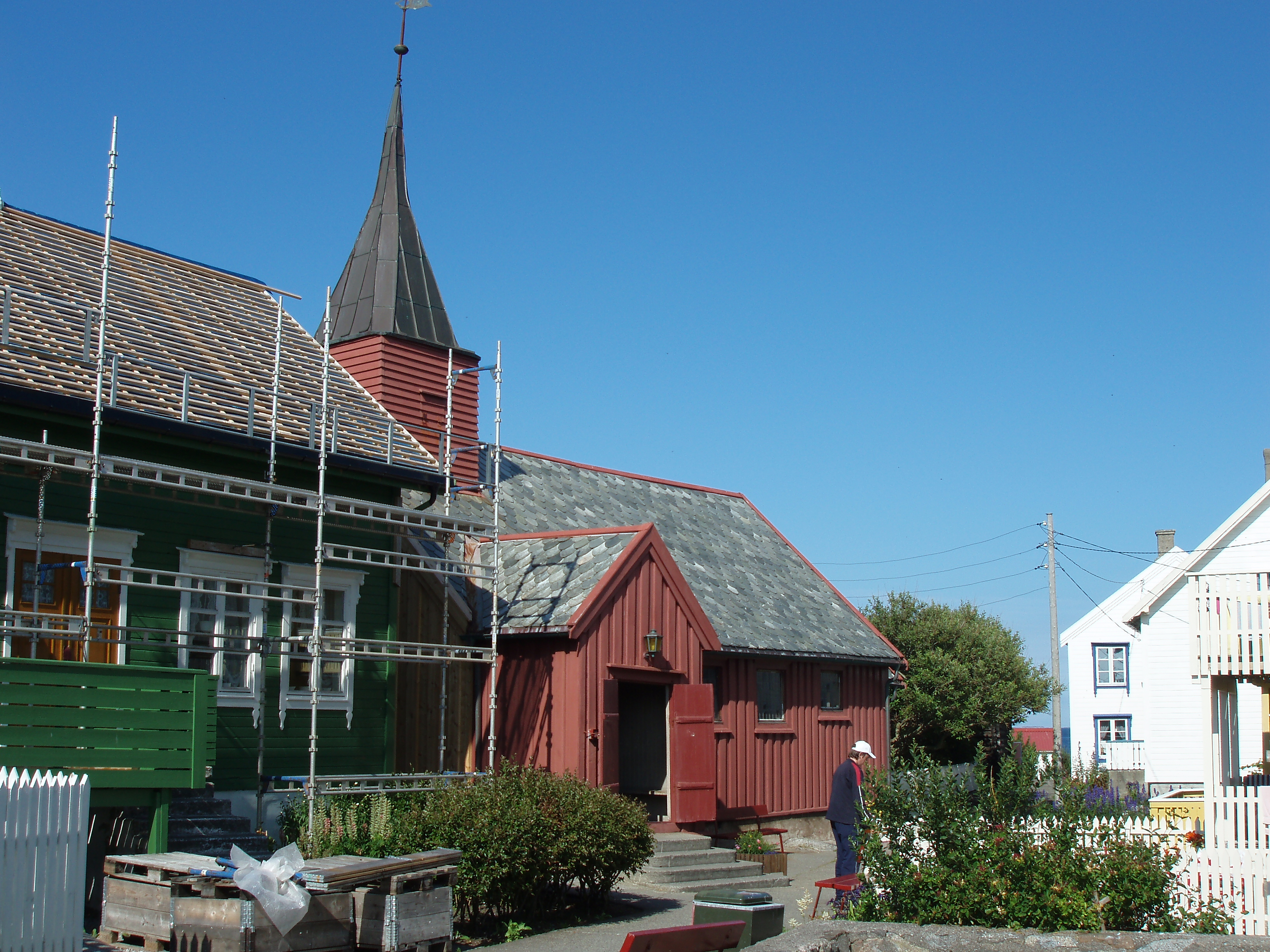
View of the church and surroundings

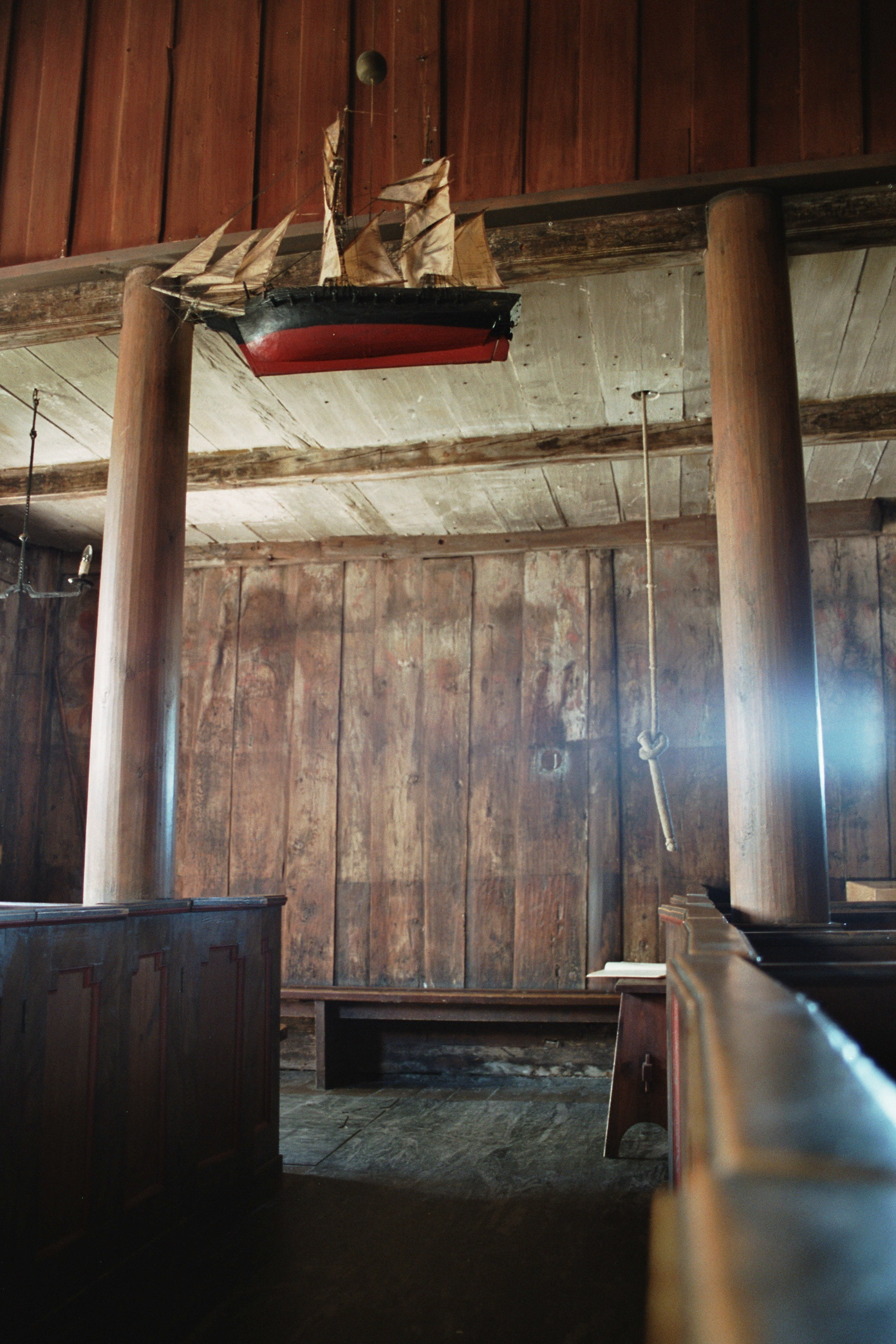
The nave and second votive ship seen from the altar

== See also ==
- List of churches in Møre
