= Flew (surname) =

Flew is a surname of English origin. People with the surname include:

- Antony Flew (1923–2010), English philosopher who renounced his atheism
- Robert Newton Flew (1886–1962), English Methodist minister and theologian
- Terry Flew, Australian professor of media and communication
