= Ful =

Ful or FUL may refer to:

- Fula language
- Fula people
- Ful medames, a fava bean dish of Sudan and Egypt
- Fullerton Municipal Airport, California, United States; IATA code FUL
- Fullerton Transportation Center, California; Amtrak code FUL
