= Romsdalsposten =

Norwegian newspaper

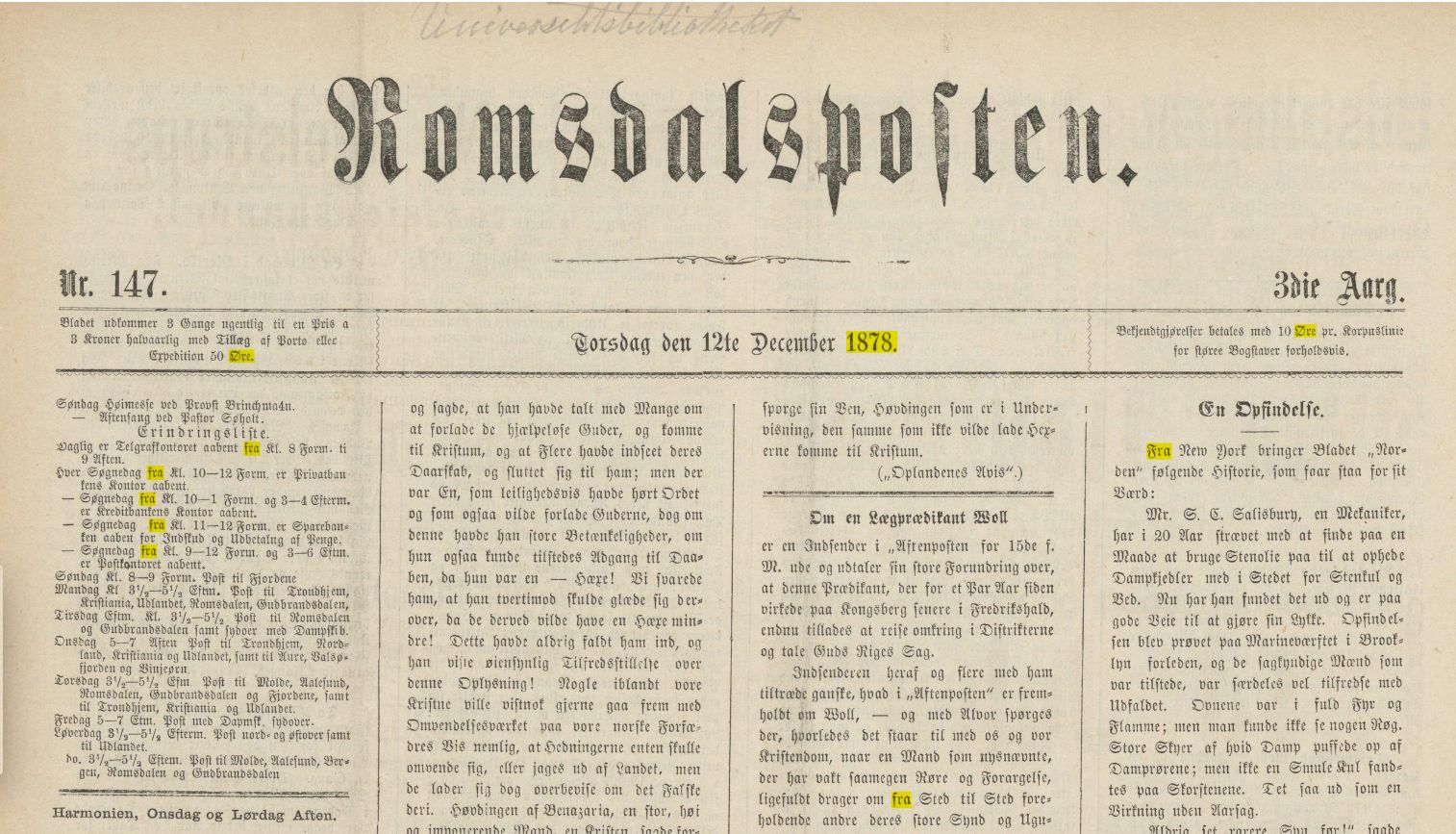

Romsdalsposten was a Norwegian newspaper, published in Kristiansund in Møre og Romsdal.

Romsdalsposten was started on 5 January 1876, and issued by printer John Johnsen the first fifty years. The first editor was N. T. Holme. Among its later editors were Olai Olsen from 1888 to 1890, Jonas Hestnes from 1891 to 1896 and Toralv Øksnevad from 1927 to 1933. In the inter-war period it had a circulation of around 8,000. From 1936 to the 1960s Aksel Hoel was the editor, except for some years during the occupation of Norway by Nazi Germany when John Johnsen Jr. was a Nazi-installed editor.

From 31 May 1986 the newspaper changed its name to Nordmørsposten, and was owned by Dagbladet. It ceased to appear after its last issue on 27 October 1990, after Dagbladet had reached a mutual understanding with A-pressen. A-pressen owned the competing newspaper Tidens Krav, which had prevailed in Kristiansund's newspaper market.
