= Oscar Andreas Ingebrigtsen =

Norwegian politician (1902–1979)

Oscar Andreas Ingebrigtsen (5 September 1902 – 28 May 1979) was a Norwegian politician for the Labour Party.

He was born in Aalesund, and spent his career as a rotary printer press in the newspapers Aalesunds Avis from 1918 to 1941 and Sunnmøre Arbeideravis from 1945 to 1972. He was a trade unionist, and a board member and chair in several local companies, including the cinematographer.

He was a member of the municipal council of Ålesund Municipality from 1945 to 1963, serving as mayor from 1955 to 1957. He served as a deputy representative to the Parliament of Norway for the constituency Market towns of Møre og Romsdal county during the terms 1958–1961, 1961–1965 and 1965–1969. He was a full representative from January to September 1958, as he covered for Ulrik Olsen who was a member of government. Ingebrigtsen was a member of the Standing Committee on Public Administration.
