= Øksnevad =

Øksnevad is a Norwegian surname. Notable people with the surname include:

- Reidar Øksnevad (1884–1958), Norwegian journalist, bibliographer, and librarian
- Toralv Øksnevad (1891–1975), Norwegian politician
