= Witzøe =

Witzøe is a surname of Norwegian origin. Notable people with the surname include:

- Endre Magnus Witzøe (1875-1934), Norwegian ship broker and politician
- Gustav Magnar Witzøe (born 1993), Norwegian billionaire
