= Peter Kjeldseth Moe =

Norwegian politician

Peter Kjeldseth Moe (18 May 1909 – 30 June 1973) was a Norwegian politician for the Labour Party.

He was elected to the Norwegian Parliament from Møre og Romsdal in 1958, and was re-elected on three occasions. He previously served as a deputy representative in the period 1954–1957. During this term he served temporarily as a regular representative meanwhile Ulrik Olsen were appointed to the Cabinet, until July 1956 when the death of Anton Ludvik Alvestad meant that Moe was to be considered a full representative. Olsen was instead covered by another former deputy representative Arnfinn Severin Roald. Peter Kjeldseth Moe died in 1973 shortly before the end of his last term, and was replaced by Oskar Edøy.

Moe was born in Ørsta. He was mayor of Ørsta Municipality in the periods 1945–1947 and 1947–1951.

Political offices
Preceded by Nils Kristen Jacobsen	Chair of the Standing Committee on Transport; 1969–June 1973	Succeeded by
