= Aarønes =

Aarønes is a Norwegian surname. Notable people with the surname include:

- Ann Kristin Aarønes (born 1973), Norwegian footballer
- Karl Johan Aarønes (1900–1969), Norwegian politician
