= Gottfred Hoem =

Norwegian politician

Gottfred Hoem (12 October 1900 – 17 November 1979) was a Norwegian politician for the Labour Party.

He was born in Fræna Municipality. He took commercial education in Kristiania at Wang School. He worked in Molde from 1915, and served as director of transport in Møre og Romsdal county from 1941 to 1946 and director-general in Norges rutebileieres forbund from 1946 to 1968. From 1952 to 1968 he was a board member of the Norway Travel Association.

He was a member of the municipal council for Molde Municipality from 1928 to 1937, serving as deputy mayor briefly in 1931 and 1937. He served as a deputy representative to the Parliament of Norway for the constituency Market towns of Møre og Romsdal county during the term 1945–1949. He served almost the entire term as a full representative, however, as he covered for Kaare Fostervoll from December 1945 to June 1948 and for Ulrik Olsen from December 1948 to the term's end.

Hoem was decorated with the HM The King's Medal of Merit in gold in 1968, and died in 1979.
