= Harald Grytten =

Norwegian philologist and historian (1938–2025)

Harald Grytten (5 December 1938 – 19 December 2025) was a Norwegian philologist and historian.

== Early life and education ==
Grytten was born in Ålesund, Norway on 5 December 1938. He had a Master's degree in Nordic History from the University of Bergen from 1973 with the main thesis An examination of the spoken language on Midøya...

== Professional life ==
From 1973 to 1993, Grytten was director of the Ålesund's Museum. He was a known expert on Ålesund's and Sunnmøre’s history, and has published several books about the city of Åalesund, its people, and the surrounding region. Through his work as a museum curator, was key in the rediscovery of Aalesund’s Jugendstil (Art Nouveau) architecture and art that characterizes the city’s center after it was rebuilt in the wake of the Alesund fire of 1904.

Grytten was a well-known communicator with a hands-on approach to history. For many years, he led an urban public history movement in which he taught history in public - atop of a wooden stool - and informally told people about the town's history. His commitment to these city walks and the sharing local history gave Harald Grytten the status of a well-known cultural personality. In 2004, Grytten received the Communication Award in Møre og Romsdal. The prize is awarded by the Norwegian Communications Association's of Møre og Romsdal. His weekly articles on the local Newspaper “Nytt i uka”, continue his tradition of directly telling about the city’s History from “the Top of the Wooden Stool”.

== Death ==
Grytten died on 19 December 2025, at the age of 87.

== Honours ==
- Awarded the Møre og Romsdal fylkes kulturpris (Cultural Prize of the County of More og Romsdal) in 1991.
- On Grytten's 50th birthday, in 1988, he was honored with the publication of the history of his life's work Festskrift til Harald Grytten: Ålesund i mitt hjerte.
- In 2008, he received the Nors Kulturarvs year prize
- In 2010, he was appointed Knight of the 1st class of the Royal Norwegian Order of St. Olav "for his significant efforts for Norwegian cultural heritage".
- In 2013, a sculpture representing Grytten was inaugurated in Ålesund. The statue is entitled "The Wanderer", and it was sculpted by Olav Leon Roald
- In 2019, he received the annual prize for Relevance in Culture, in Ålesund.

== Bibliography ==
- Byvandring Gater og Steder I Det Gamle og Nye Alesund (In Norwegian);Hardcover, Published 1983 by Nordvest: ISBN 82-90330-16-2
- Byvandring Gater Og Steder I Det Gamle Og Nye Alesund III, Published 1982 by Nordvest, Alesund, Norway; ISBN 82-90330-14-6
- Farstad - a Ship Owning Company in Ålesund 1956-2006, Published 2008; ISBN 82-90330-14-6
- Norske fabrikkskip nyskapende, effektive og omstridt by Harald Grytten, Arne Hammer, Harald Kjølås, Published 2005;ISBN 82-997931-1-4
- Fugl Føniks Ålesund opp av asken by Harald Grytten, Malvin Dalhus, Published 2004; ISBN 82-91024-08-1
- Tre Malere I By Og Bygd Johan Fredrik Berg, Ole Andreas Ekrem, Abraham Hanssen, Published 2002 by Nytt I Ukas Forlag, Ålesund, Norway; ISBN 82-91024-05-7
- Viltre gutt byen som brente by Harald Grytten, Malvin Dalhus, Ålesund . Museet, Published 2002;ISBN 82-91024-06-5
- 1948 - 1968, by Harald Grytten, Published 1998; ISBN 82-91450-06-4I
- 1968 - 1998, by Harald Grytten, Published 1999; ISBN 82-91450-07-2
- Fisk og forbund et festskrift med historiske linjer : Fiskebåtredernes Forbund 50 år : 1946-1996, by Harald Grytten, Tiske Giske, Published 1996; ISBN 82-993729-0-9
- Byleksikon Litt om mye i Ålesund by Harald Grytten, Alfred Lupke, Inger K. Giskeødegård, Published 1997; ISBN 82-91450-05-6
- Jugendbyen Alesund The City of Art Nouveau, by Harald Grytten, Jiri Havran, Published 1996 by Art Data; ISBN 82-91399-02-6
- Da freden kom til Ålesund by Jan Olav Flatmark, Harald Grytten, Published 1995; ISBN 82-91024-02-2
- Til fots i Ålesund en rusletur i den gamle og nye by ved Ålesundet by Harald Grytten, Inger K. Giskeødegård, Published 1994; ISBN 82-90151-04-7
- Bilder fra Sildefisket pa Morekysten i 1950-ara by Magne Flem, Bjarne Skarbovik, Harald Grytten, Published 1994 by Sunnmorsposten 1994; ISBN 82-91450-01-3
- Gjermundnesboka (Norwegian Edition) by Bjørn Austigard, Harald Grytten, Anne Merete Knudsen, Published 1989 by Landbruksmuseet Pa Gjermundnes; ISBN 82-991920-0-5
- Kvær sin smak! gullkorn fra Ålesund og deromkring, Published 1988; ISBN 82-521-3277-4
- Ålesund forteller (Norwegian Edition) by Harald Grytten, Juel Hamre, Published 1987 by Nordvest; ISBN 82-90330-38-3
- Ålesund og Sunnmøre (Norwegian Edition) by Harald Grytten, Per Eide, Published 1985 by Nordvest; ISBN 82-90330-29-4
- Byvandring gater og steder i det gamle og nye Ålesund, Published 1981; ISBN 82-90330-05-7
- Borgund kirke, Published 2007; ISBN 82-994087-1-7
- Ein ungdom på hundre, Published 2005; ISBN 82-92055-19-3
- Alesund Brenner Byen under Ild Og Aske, Published 2004: ISBN 82-91024-07-3
- Søskenbarna og andre lykkelige tilstander i Ålesund, Published 1993; ISBN 82-91024-01-4
- Ålesund i hverdag og krig små og store hendelser fra de underlige åra 1940 - 1945 by Jan Olav Flatmark, Harald Grytten, Published 1988; ISBN 82-90330-44-8
- På skisseblokka gjennom Ålesund by Inger K. Giskeødegård, Published 1992; ISBN 82-990937-7-5
- Musikk og sang i Ålesund frem gjennom tidene litt om mye, fra A til Å, Published 2014; ISBN 82-92055-54-1
- Romsdal Sogelag Årsskrift 1989 by Bjørn Austigard, Nils Parelius, Published by Romsdal Sogelag; ISBN 82-90169-32-9
- Romsdal Sogelag Årsskrift 1992 by Bjørn Austigard, Nils Parelius, Published by Romsdal Sogelag; ISBN 82-90169-39-6I
- Romsdal Sogelag Årsskrift 2007 by Bjørn Austigard, Dag Skarstein, Rolf Strand, Published by Romsdal Sogelag; ISBN 82-90169-88-4
