= Ulrik Olsen =

Norwegian politician

Minister of Local Government
- In office 20 December 1948 – 1 September 1958
- Prime Minister: Einar Gerhardsen; Oscar Torp; Einar Gerhardsen
- Preceded by: Position established
- Succeeded by: Andreas Cappelen

Member of the Norwegian Parliament
- In office 1 January 1934 – 30 September 1961
- Deputy: Gottfred Hoem (1948–1950); Karl Johan Aarønes (1950–1954); Peter Kjeldseth Moe (1954–1956); Arnfinn Severin Roald (1956–1958); Oscar Andreas Ingebrigtsen (1958)
- Constituency: Møre og Romsdal

Personal details
- Born: Johan Ulrik Olsen; 2 August 1885 Hitra, Søndre Trondhjem, United Kingdoms of Sweden and Norway
- Died: 4 October 1963 (aged 78) Kristiansund, Romsdalen, Norway
- Party: Labour
- Parent(s): Peder Olsen (father); Dorothea Hesnes (mother)

Johan Ulrik Olsen (2 August 1885 – 4 October 1963) was a Norwegian politician for the Labour Party.

He was born in Hitteren as a son of farmer Peder Olsen (1847–1933) og Dorothea Hesnes (1848–1931). He became a journeyman carpenter in 1899, at the age of 14, and worked in that field until 1914, when he started his own fishing business. He was involved in the local branch of the International Organisation of Good Templars, from 1917 to 1918 he was a board member of Norges kooperative landsforening, and from 1913 to 1940 and 1945 to 1947 he was the board chairman of the local newspaper Tidens Krav. He was a member of Kristiansund city council from 1913 to 1951, serving as mayor from 1934 to 1940 and 1945 to 1947. He also chaired the city school board from 1928 to 1933.

Olsen was elected to the Parliament of Norway in 1933, representing the constituency Market towns of Møre og Romsdal county. He was re-elected five times, ending his last term in 1961. From 1948 to 1958 he served as the Norwegian Minister of Local Government and Labour. He was the first to hold this position, and served in both Gerhardsen's Second Cabinet, Torp's Cabinet and Gerhardsen's Third Cabinet. As he was not actually present in Parliament while serving as a Minister, his seat was taken by deputies Gottfred Hoem (1948–1950), Karl Johan Aarønes (1950–1954), Peter Kjeldseth Moe (1954–1956), Arnfinn Severin Roald (1956–1958) and Oscar Andreas Ingebrigtsen (1958–1958).

Olsen has been credited for co-founding Utbyggingsfondet for Nord-Norge. He was the chairman of the board from 1952 to 1961, and also a board member of Norges Kommunalbank from 1946 to 1954.

Political offices
New title	Norwegian Minister of Local Government and Labour; 1948–1958	Succeeded by Andreas Zeier Cappelen
