= Arnfinn Severin Roald =

Norwegian politician

Deputy representative to the Norwegian Parliament
- In office 1945–1961
- Constituency: Møre og Romsdal

Personal details
- Born: June 26, 1914 Vigra Municipality, Norway
- Died: January 16, 1983
- Party: Labour Party

Arnfinn Severin Roald (26 June 1914 – 16 January 1983) was a Norwegian politician for the Labour Party.

He was born in Vigra Municipality.

Roald represented Møre og Romsdal. He was never elected directly to the Norwegian Parliament but rather served as a deputy representative in the periods 1945–1949, 1950–1953, 1954–1957 and 1958–1961. During the third term he was brought in as a replacement representative for Ulrik Olsen, who was appointed to the Cabinet at that time, after Olsen's original replacer Peter Kjeldseth Moe formally moved up in the line of succession to replace Anton Ludvik Alvestad who died in July 1956. Roald sat through that term and then returned to serve in deputy position.

On local level Roald was deputy mayor of Vigra Municipality in the period 1959–1963. Before and after this spell he served as a regular member of the municipal council for Vigra Municipality, and later on the council for Giske Municipality (Vigra became part of Giske in 1964). He retired from this position in 1975.
