= Ivar Bae =

Norwegian politician

Ivar Bae (29 October 1897 – 18 August 1967) was a Norwegian politician for the Conservative Party.

He was born in Bremsnes Municipality.

He was a member of the executive committee of the municipal council for Kristiansund Municipality from 1937 to 1940. He was elected to the Norwegian Parliament from the Market towns of Møre og Romsdal county in 1945, but was not re-elected in 1949.

Outside politics, he worked as a banker from 1916 to 1967.
