= Knut Engdahl =

Norwegian politician (born 1933)

Knut Engdahl (born 20 June 1933) is a Norwegian politician for the Conservative Party. He served as a deputy representative to the Norwegian Parliament from Møre og Romsdal during the 1977–1981 term. He was also mayor of Kristiansund Municipality from 1981–1983.
