= Dagfinn Ripnes =

Norwegian politician (born 1939)

Dagfinn Ripnes (born 12 January 1939) is a Norwegian politician for the Conservative Party.

He served as a deputy representative to the Norwegian Parliament from Møre og Romsdal during the term 1997–2001.

On the local level he was mayor of Kristiansund municipality from 1997 to 2007.
