= Karl Johan Aarønes =

Norwegian politician for the Labour Party

- Born: 8 May 1900; Bolsøy Municipality, Møre og Romsdal, Norway
- Died: 12 August 1969 (aged 69)
- Education: Møre Folk High School
- Occupation: Politician

Karl Johan Aarønes (8 May 1900 – 12 August 1969) was a Norwegian politician for the Labour Party.

He was born in Bolsøy Municipality, attended Møre Folk High School from 1917 to 1918 and took a short technical education in Kristiania from 1921 to 1922. He had begun working with roads already in 1916, and spent most his career in the county road office. When he retired in 1967 he was director of labour in Møre og Romsdal county.

He was a member of the municipal council of Molde Municipality from 1945 to 1955 and 1959 to 1963, serving as deputy mayor from 1951 to 1955 and 1959 to 1963. He served as a deputy representative to the Parliament of Norway for the constituency Market towns of Møre og Romsdal county during the term 1950–1953. He served the entire term as a full representative, however, as he covered for Ulrik Olsen who was a member of government. Aarønes was a member of the Standing Committee on Local Government.

Aarønes was deputy chair in the trade union Embetskontor-funksjonærenes landsforbund from 1934 to 1946, and was also involved in the temperance movement. He died in 1969.
