= Jonas Hestnes =

Norwegian politician

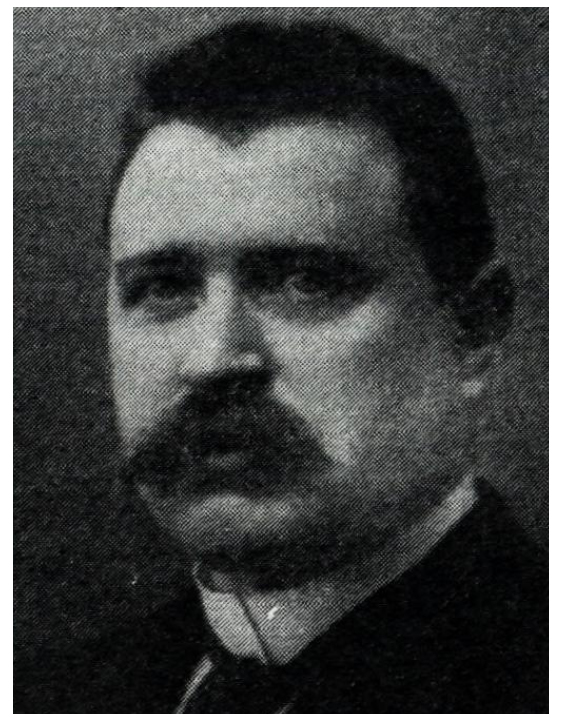
- Born: 27 October 1869; Halsa, Norway
- Died: 29 November 1926 (aged 57); Kristiansund
- Occupation: Politician

Jonas Johansen Hestnes (October 27, 1869 – November 19, 1926) was a Norwegian newspaper editor and a politician for the Liberal Party. He served in the Storting as a representative for Kristiansund from 1910 to 1915.

Hestnes was the son of the farmer Johan Nilsen Hestnes and Karen Jakobsdatter, and the brother of the Storting representative Nils Hestnes. He grew up on the Hestnes farm along Valsøyfjord. In 1898 he married the music teacher Tora Solem and had several children with her. After graduating from the Tromsø Teachers' College in 1888, he was a teacher in Kristiansund from 1889 to 1890 and in Ibestad Municipality from 1891 to 1893. Hestnes served as the editor of the Liberal Party newspaper Romsdalsposten in Kristiansund from 1891 to 1926.

Hestnes was known as a proficient public speaker, and was much influenced by his friendship with Bjørnstjerne Bjørnson, Hans Rasmus Astrup, Vilhelm Andreas Wexelsen, and Johannes Steen. Hestnes served in the Storting as a representative from Kristiansund from 1910 to 1915, and was a deputy representative for Ivar Olaus Sundet from 1916 to 1918. Hestnes served a secretary on the Storting's Social Affairs Committee from 1910 to 1915 and as deputy secretary in the lower house (Odelsting) in 1913. He was the only Riksmål proponent in the Liberal Party's parliamentary group after 1909 and he campaigned vigorously for this issue, which almost cost him the nomination in 1912.

He was a member of the city council and executive committee for Kristiansund Municipality from 1899 to 1926, deputy mayor from 1908 to 1910, and mayor twice (1911–1913 and 1916–1917). He chaired the Romsdal district's Liberal Society from 1901 to 1906, as well as the Kristiansund Liberal Society. From 1918 to 1921 he was the city manager of Kristiansund. His positions in the business world included chair of the Nordmøre Marine Insurance Association (1906–1910), director of the Nordmøre Telephone Company, member of the board of trustees of the Kristiansund Savings Bank in 1902, and a board member at Norges Bank's local branch from 1912 to 1926.
