= Dagfinn Koch =

Dagfinn Koch (born 24 July 1964, in Kristiansund, Norway) is a musician.

== Education ==
He studied at the State Academy of music (Norges musikkhøgskole) (Lasse Thoresen, composition; Olav Anton Thommessen, orchestration; Bjørn Kruse, arranging; Mads Claesson, Arild Erikstad og Tore Simonsen, music technology; Otto Berg, viola), and at Hochschule (now Universität) der Künste Berlin (Witold Szalonek, composition).

== Music career ==
He has been freelancing since 1994, and has written music for orchestra, chamber and theatre music, opera, ballet and fine art installations. Besides that has he worked as an arranger for amongst others Finn Coren and Lucifer Was. He has been a member of the Oslo Philharmonic program committee and a member of the board in the Composers society and in the evaluation committee of TONO (the Norwegian BIEM/ASCAP).

In addition to composition, he has worked in a youth club, as a teacher in a music school in Oslo, Bærum and Bergen, as a music copyist and engraver, and as a sound engineer (Henie-Onstad Art center). He has received several scholarships from TONO and was granted a two-year scholarship from the Norwegian Ministry for Cultural Affairs in 2006. He was accepted as a member of the Composers society in 1991.

Dagfinn has not sought a particular style. He is more concerned with being able to move in any possible direction. This experience has developed into a method (not style) which he calls "Translucence" - a method that builds on post war-modernism techniques combined with an idiomatic way of writing. For him it is not important to use music to communicate a "deeper meaning", but to present a narrative music which gives the listeners (and readers of his scores) a diversity of possible interpretations.

== Personal life ==
Dagfinn has lived in Oslo since 2005, and in Germany for 13 years.

== Key works ==
- Translucence (2005–2006) for Brass Band
- Versuch über Schatten, Farben und Licht (2001/2006) for Brass Band
- Das ersehnte Licht (2002) for orchestra
- Rückblick (1997/2003) for string quartett or string orchestra
- Elegie (2002) for violin og grand piano
- Pesni i tanzi (1999) for flute/altoflute, clarinet/bassclarinett, horn and grand piano
- Le mystère de la voix (1999) for violoncello solo
- Transitus (1997) for organ
- Aura (1995) for string orchestra or 16 solo string players
- Liebeslied (1994-97 rev. 1999) for orchestra

== Discography ==
- «21 Marches For The 21st Century» Simax Classics PSC 1163
- «A Norwegian Rendezvous» Kristiansand Kammerorkester/Jan Stigmer. Works of Nordheim, Kvandal, Åm and Koch. INTIM Musik IMCD 065
