= Oscar Ludvig Larsen =

Norwegian politician

Oscar Ludvig Larsen (20 March 1880 – 5 November 1962) was a Norwegian politician for the Conservative Party.

He was elected to the Norwegian Parliament in 1919 from the constituency Aalesund og Molde, and was re-elected in 1922 from the Market towns of Møre og Romsdal county.

He was born in Ålesund, and worked as a wholesaler and ship-owner. From 1915 to 1925 he was a vice consul of Sweden. He was a member of Ålesund city council from 1907 to 1922.
