= Toralv Øksnevad =

Norwegian politician (1891–1975)

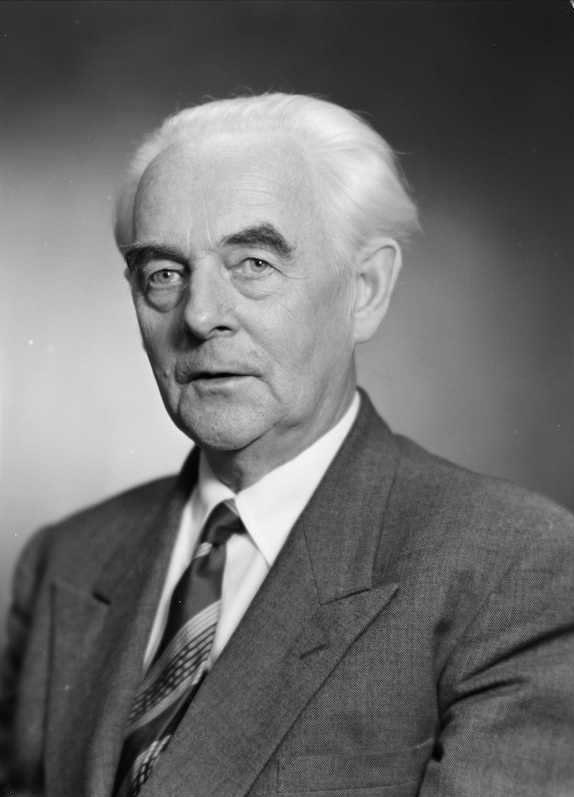
- Toralv Øksnevad in 1956
- Born: 13 January 1891; Høyland Municipality, Norway
- Died: 31 July 1975 (aged 84); Oslo
- Occupations: Journalist, newspaper editor, radio personality
- Agent(s): Dagbladet, Romsdalsposten, Norwegian Broadcasting Corporation, BBC
- Relatives: Reidar Øksnevad (brother); Arne Skouen (son-in-law); Synne Skouen (granddaughter)

Toralv Øksnevad (13 January 1891 – 31 July 1975) was a Norwegian politician, journalist, newspaper editor and radio personality. He was known as the "voice from London" during World War II, when listening to foreign radio in Norway was illegal, and from October 1942 implied risk of death penalty.

== Personal life ==
Øksnevad was born in Høyland Municipality, a son of teacher Arnt Øksnevad and Kirsten Torine Folkvord, and was a brother of librarian Reidar Øksnevad. His daughter married journalist and film director Arne Skouen, and he was a grandfather of composer Synne Skouen. He died in Oslo in 1975.

== Journalist career ==
Øksnevad was a journalist for Dagbladet from 1912 to 1920, was press attaché in Paris 1920–1924, and again journalist for Dagbladet 1924–1927. He was editor-in-chief for the regional newspaper Romsdalsposten 1927–1933.

He started working for the Norwegian Broadcasting Corporation (NRK) in 1933, and became the leader for the news department in 1938. In April 1940 he fled from occupied Norway to neutral Sweden, and traveled to London in August 1940, to negotiate with BBC. In London he participated in the BBC's broadcasting in the Norwegian language until 1945. Øksnevad was the program director of NRK-in-exile, except for brief periods. Before Øksnevad travelled from Sweden to London, Aake Anker Ording was acting director, and from July to October 1941 Øksnevad visited his family in the United States, during which time Olav Rytter was acting director. Øksnevad's regular Sunday evening speeches had a significant influence on the Norwegian war resistance. The book Det lå i luften from 1946 contains about 160 of his London radio speeches.

Øksnevad cooperated very closely with Prime Minister-in-exile Johan Nygaardsvold, and wrote his speeches on occasions. He was on less good terms with Minister of Foreign Affairs Halvdan Koht.

From 1945 he worked for NRK in Oslo, as a program editor, and from 1946 to 1961 as editor of foreign affairs.

== Political career ==
Øksnevad was chairman for the Young Liberals of Norway from 1914 to 1916, and chairman for the Oslo section of the Liberal Party from 1924 to 1927. He was a deputy representative to the Parliament of Norway for two periods, both periods for the Liberal Party: during 1931–1933, from the constituency Market towns of Møre og Romsdal county, and 1954–1957 from Oslo. In the 1949 parliamentary election he also headed the party's ballot, from Oslo, but was not elected. He was elected member of Oslo city council from 1951 to 1959, and deputy mayor from 1956 to 1957.

== Books ==
- Det lå i luften (1946)
- Norges fiskerigrense (1952)
- Joh. Ludw. Mowinckel (1963)

Party political offices
Preceded by Hans Hope	Chairman of the Young Liberals of Norway; 1914–1916	Succeeded by Torkell Løvland
