= Kristian Langlo =

Norwegian politician

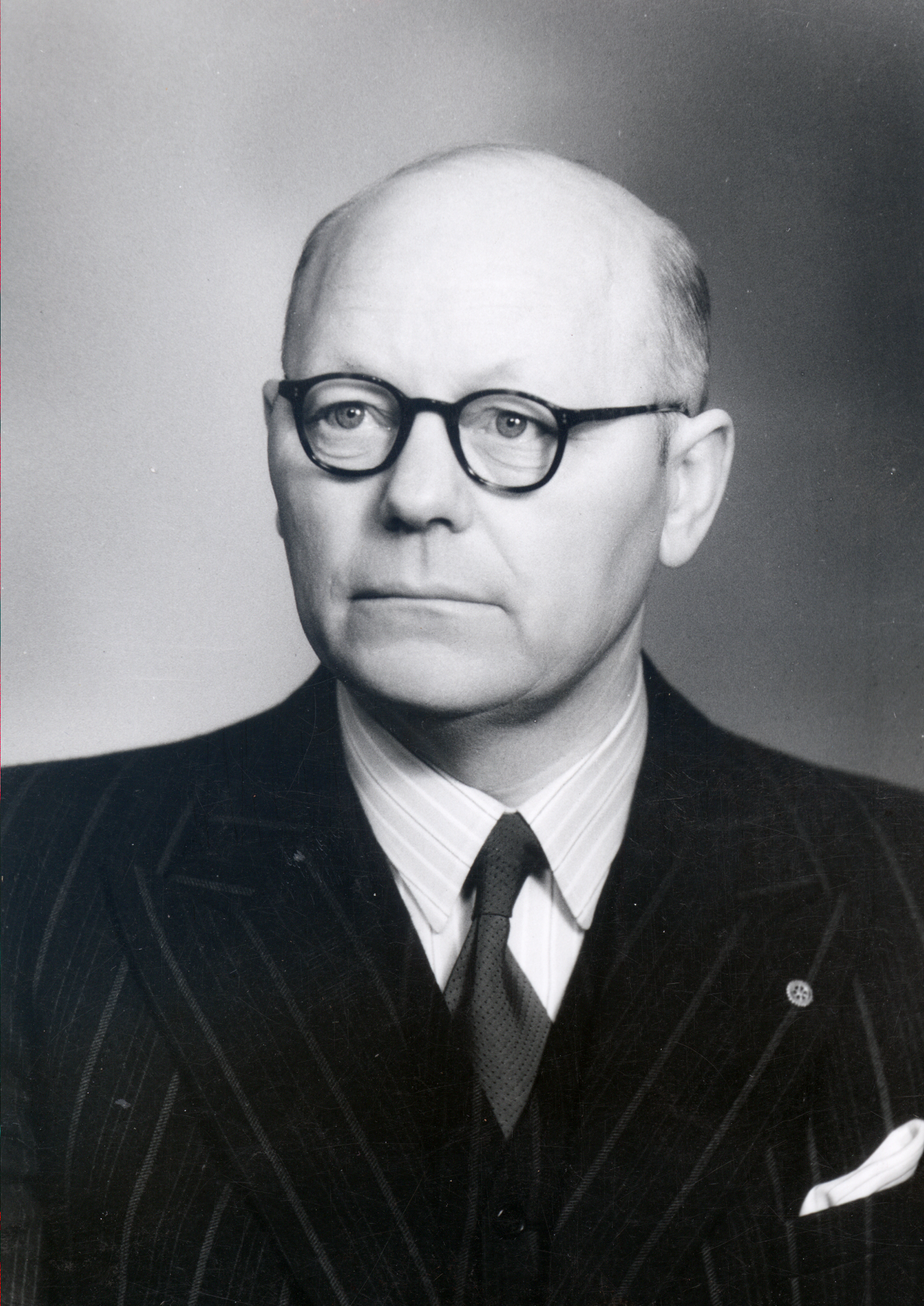
Kristian Langlo

Kristian Langlo (3 May 1894 – 20 October 1976) was a Norwegian politician for the Liberal Party.

He was born in Stranda Municipality. He was elected to the Norwegian Parliament from the Market towns of Møre og Romsdal county in 1949, and was later re-elected on one occasion (in 1961).

Langlo held various positions in municipal council of Ålesund Municipality from 1931 to 1934 and 1945 to 1955, serving as mayor in the period 1947–1949.
