= TKTV =

Defunct Norwegian local television station

TKTV, known as TV Nordvest before 2008, was a local television station servicing Nordmøre in Norway. It had until 2008 serviced the regions of Sunnmøre and Romsdal as well. It was owned by the holding company Mediegruppen Møre, of which the newspaper Tidens Krav held the largest share by the time of the TV station's dissolution in 2015.

== History ==
TV Nordvest was established in 1988, and in short time partnered with TVNorge, one of the first to do so.

After disagreements surrounding money and airing hours in 2002, their then partnership with TV Norge came to an end, after which they remained a private company until their purchase in 2005 by the holding company Amfi Eiendom. The editor stated that this decision was made to better establish themselves in the Romsdal district surrounding Molde after being mostly focused on the Nordmøre region surrounding Kristiansund further east. They also stated their intention to avoid being purchased by Tidens Krav or Adressa, two local newspapers, to not create a media monopoly in the region. After the purchase, the holding company Mediegruppen Mære was created in 2006, which now owned both TV Sunnmøre, the local TV station for Sunnmøre.

In 2004, the TV station was warned of potential sanctions by the Mass Media Authority along with three others, TVRomerike, TVTromsø, TVØstfold. Though the other three were warned for violations of guidelines surrounding sponsorships, TV Nordvest's warning remains unknown.

In 2007, the newspaper Tidens Krav purchased 36% of shares in the media group Mediegruppen Møre. Later the same year, TV Sunnmøre was merged with TV Nordvest. A year later in 2008, Tidens Krav announced their plan to split TV Nordvest into TKTV and TV Romsdal, which would service the regions of Nordmøre and Romsdal respectively. Additionally, TV Sunnmøre would again start airing over a different channel.

After years of economic stagnation from stiff online competition, Tidens Krav announced their plans to cease the production of local radio and TV in 2015. TKTV's final broadcast aired on 30 October 2015, before being shut down permanently two days later on 1 November.
