= Petter Schramm =

Norwegian poet

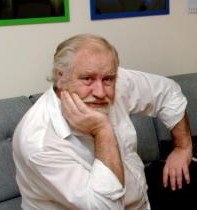
- Schramm at Slemmestad library February 2011
- Born: June 4, 1946
- Died: June 27, 2014 (aged 68)
- Occupation: Writer
- Spouse: Inger Elizabeth Løkvik
- Writing career
- Period: 20/21st century
- Genre: Poetry
- Notable work: Guitar Globe

Petter Schramm (June 4, 1946 – June 27, 2014) was a Norwegian poet.

== Biography ==
=== Background ===
Schramm grew up in Kristiansund but moved left the city in 1968. Until 1980 he lived several places in Norway but was by his death living in Røyken.

=== Activity as writer ===
He debuted as a poet in 1986 with the collection of poems Guitar Globe. The editor described, at the publishing, Schramm poetry this way: "The poems have a rare power of expression. They are bricked up by the dense visual lines that form intricate patterns, playful and empowering at the same time. The influence of French and Latin American surrealism is clear".
Later he wrote the poetry collection Stoler ved havet, published by Gyldendal, and edited a selection of his newspaper poems as his own publisher. In addition, he has written newspaper articles, reviews of art exhibitions and has performed readings of his own poems in different contexts. The lyrics by Peter Schramm has been used as texts and inspiration for music, the composer Harald Sæther has written a Ballet Suite with texts from the Guitar Globe.

== Bibliography ==
- Gitarklode (Guitar Globe), poetry published in 1986 (Gyldendal)
- Stoler ved havet (Chairs by the sea), poetry published in 1987 (Gyldendal)
- Havland og mennesketegn (Sea countries and human signs), selected poems written for newspapers 1971 – 1994 published in 1995 (own publisher, press: Nor-Pro AS, Kristiansund)
- Stemmer i et hus (Voices in a house), an anthology – 10 poems (Aschehoug)
