= John Moses (Norwegian politician) =

Member of the Norwegian Constituent Assembly

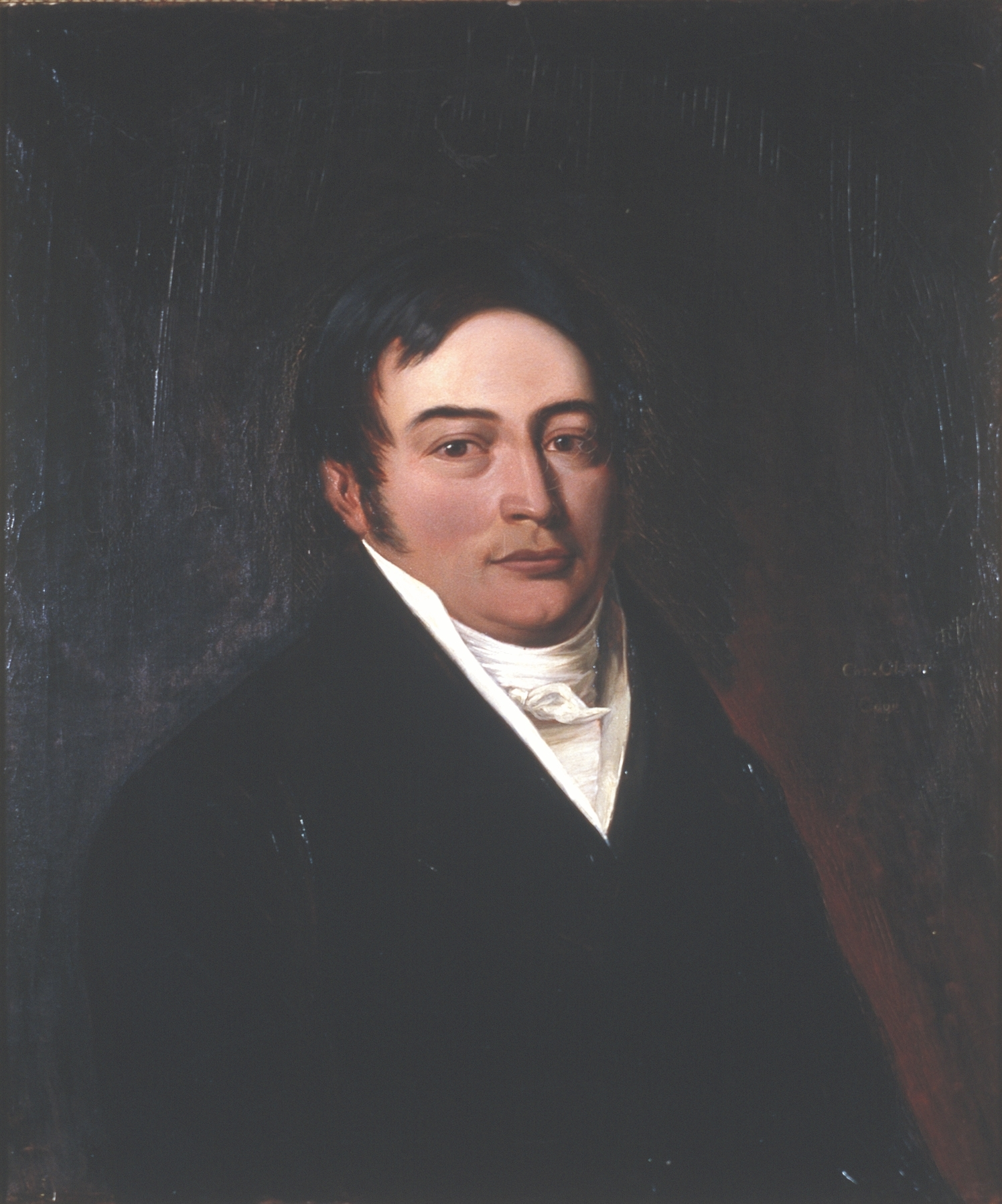
John Moses

John Moses (16 April 1781 – 29 January 1849) was a Norwegian merchant who served as a representative at the Norwegian Constituent Assembly in 1814.

John Moses was born in Kristiansund in Møre og Romsdal, Norway. He belonged to a merchant family of British descent who had settled in Kristiansund to conduct the trade of large-scale fish exports. John Moses was one of Kristiansund's leading businessmen. He ran an export and import business, together with a shipping company. From the 1820s, he was living in London, where he ran the shipping business, conducting trading in a number of European countries.

He represented Kristiansund at the Norwegian Constituent Assembly in 1814. He advocated policies that would benefit the business community. He supported the union party (Unionspartiet).

John Moses was married to Anna Holck Tordenskjold (1782–1854) with whom he had seven children. He died in the Parish of St Anne's Limehouse, at the London Borough of Tower Hamlets in London, England.
