= Sunnmøre Arbeideravis =

Norwegian newspaper

The Sunnmøre Workers Gazette
- Native name: Sunnmøre Arbeideravis
- Type: daily
- Publisher: A-pressen
- Editor: see List of editors
- Founded: 1931; 95 years ago
- Ceased publication: 1985; 41 years ago
- Relaunched: suspended during the German occupation, from May 1, 1940, until May 8, 1945
- Language: Norwegian
- City: Ålesund
- Country: Norway

Sunnmøre Arbeideravis (The Sunnmøre Workers Gazette) was a newspaper published by A-pressen in Ålesund, Norway from 1931 to 1985. It became a daily paper in 1934. The newspaper was known by the abbreviation SA.

Sunnmøre Arbeideravis was a continuation of Møre Social-Demokrat (1921–1931). Publication of Sunnmøre Arbeideravis was suspended during the German occupation, from May 1, 1940, until May 8, 1945. During its first years, the editing was overseen by an editorial committee, which consisted of Gustav Melsæther, Olav Istad, Anton L. Alvestad, and Angell Benjaminsen in 1934. When the newspaper became a daily in 1934, a permanent editor was appointed.

After the paper was discontinued, some of its staff launched the free newspaper Nytt i uka.

== List of editors ==
- Erling Tråholt 1934–1940
- Harald Thoresen 1945
- Alf Salvesen 1945–1946
- Arnvid Hasund 1946–1948
- Karl Pape 1948–1951
- Reinhardt Rørvik 1951–1953
- Simen Kr. Hangaard 1953–1960
- Odd Ragnar Torvik 1960–1964
- Magne Nedregård 1964–1968
- Johannes Skeide Larsen 1968–1971
- Torstein Dreyer 1972–1977
- Steinar Slagstad 1977–1982
- Jan-Petter Albertsen 1982–1985
