= Robert Sæther =

Norwegian politician

- Born: 6 October 1875; Valsøyfjord, Norway
- Died: 31 March 1956 (aged 80)
- Occupations: Schoolteacher; Newspaper editor Politician

Robert Sæther (6 October 1875 – 31 March 1956) was a Norwegian schoolteacher, newspaper editor and politician.

He was born in Valsøyfjord to farmer Johan Sæther and Ellen Valsø. As a local politician, Sæther was elected member of the municipal council of Kristiansund Municipality for nine periods between 1910 and 1945. He served as mayor of Kristiansund 1916–19, 1925–28, 1928–31 and 1931–34. He was elected representative to the Storting for the period 1937–1945, for the Conservative Party. During the German occupation of Norway he was removed from his job as school inspector and held a few weeks in the Vollan prison in 1944.
