= Reidar Øksnevad =

Norwegian journalist, bibliographer and librarian

- Born: 13 May 1884; Kristiansand, Norway
- Died: 31 January 1958 (aged 73)
- Occupations: journalist, bibliographer and librarian
- Relatives: Toralv Øksnevad (brother)

Reidar Øksnevad (13 May 1884 – 31 January 1958) was a Norwegian journalist, bibliographer and librarian.

He was born in Kristiansand to teacher Arnt Øksnevad and Kirsten Torine Folkvord, and was a brother of Toralv Øksnevad. Øksnevad lived in Paris for 34 years. He lectured at Sorbonne from 1913 to 1919, and was a foreign correspondent for Dagbladet and other media, and was assigned as a librarian at the Bibliothèque Sainte-Geneviève from 1924 to 1928 and from 1940 to 1945. He published around forty books, including several bibliographies. Among his works is the two-volume Norsk litteraturhistorisk bibliografi, covering the periods 1900–1945 and 1946–1955. He was decorated as a Knight of the Legion of Honour and Officier d'Académie.
