= Nytt i uka =

Norwegian newspaper

Nytt i Uka (lit. 'New This Week') is a mass-delivery free newspaper in Ålesund, Norway. It covers news from Hareid Municipality, Sula Municipality, Sykkylven Municipality, Giske Municipality, Haram Municipality, Fjord Municipality, and Vestnes Municipality. In addition, the paper is distributed to the Tomrefjord and Vestnes post offices and can also be subscribed to in Norway and abroad. The paper is published every Wednesday and has a circulation of 39,800.

Nytt i Uka is published by Media Vest AS. It was established by five employees following the bankruptcy of Sunnmøre Arbeideravis in August 1985. Nytt i Uka appeared only one week after the bankruptcy. The ownership is currently mostly held by three of the staff, who together hold approximately 86% of the share capital.

The newspaper has appeared regularly since 1985 (40 years ago), making it one of Norway's oldest free newspapers. Its turnover was NOK 20.30 million in 2014, and NOK 18.33 million in 2015. The newspaper has 21 employees. The paper's editor is Øyvind Johan Heggstad, and the manager is Berit Fugelsø Nilssen.

Media Vest AS also operates Nytt i Ukas Forlag (Nytt i Uka Publishing). As of 2017, the press had issued over 20 titles, mostly covering local history and culture.
