= Torgeir Anderssen-Rysst =

Norwegian politician

Minister of Defence
- In office 15 February 1928 – 12 May 1931
- Prime Minister: Johan L. Mowinckel
- Preceded by: Fredrik Monsen
- Succeeded by: Vidkun Quisling

Member of the Norwegian Parliament
- In office 1 January 1925 – 4 December 1945
- Constituency: Møre og Romsdal

Personal details
- Born: 9 August 1888 Ålesund, Møre og Romsdal, Sweden-Norway
- Died: 1958 (aged 69–70)
- Party: Liberal

Torgeir Anderssen-Rysst (9 August 1888 – 1958) was a Norwegian politician for the Liberal Party.

Torgeir Anderssen-Rysst was born at Ålesund in Møre og Romsdal, Norway. A lawyer by profession, he worked as editor of Sunnmørsposten from 1918 to 1928, and again in 1931 and 1934. He served as Minister of Defence in the second government of Johan Mowinckel 1928–1931. Anderssen-Rysst later worked as a tax collector in Ålesund, and served as ambassador to Iceland, remaining in that post until his death. He was also a reserve officer (Norwegian: vernepliktig officer) in the Norwegian Army.
