= Kristiansund Municipality =

Municipality in Møre og Romsdal, Norway

Kristiansund Municipality Kristiansund kommune
- Municipality
- Christianssund (historic name)
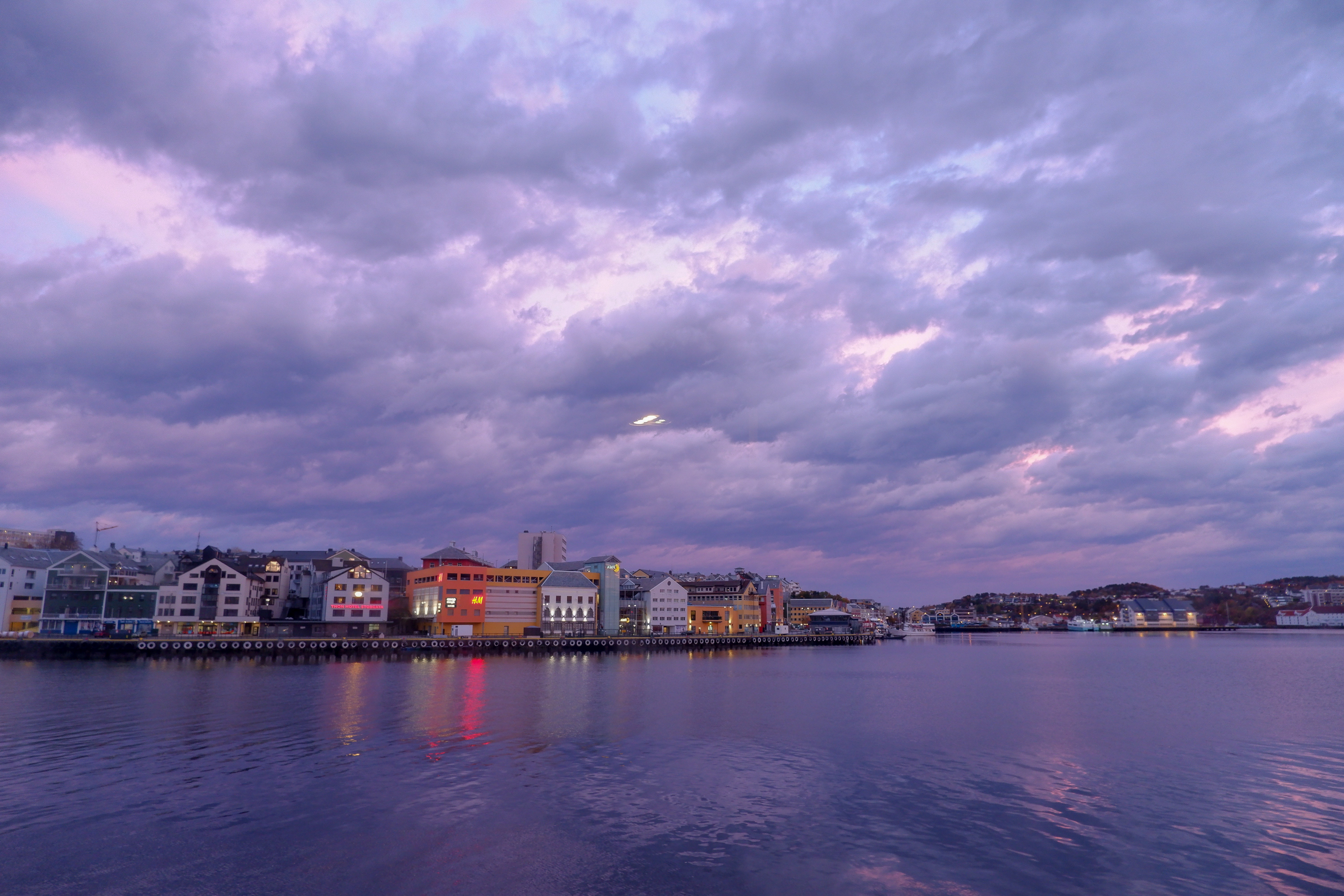
- View of Kristiansund

- Flag Coat of arms

- Møre og Romsdal within Norway

- Kristiansund within Møre og Romsdal
- Coordinates: 63°06′37″N 07°43′40″E
- Country: Norway
- County: Møre og Romsdal
- District: Nordmøre
- Established: 1 Jan 1838
  - Created as: Formannskapsdistrikt
- Administrative centre: Kristiansund

Government
  - Mayor (2015): Kjell Neergaard (Ap)

Area
  - Total: 87.44 km^{2} (33.76 sq mi)
  - Land: 86.17 km^{2} (33.27 sq mi)
  - Water: 1.27 km^{2} (0.49 sq mi) 1.5%
  - Rank: #334 in Norway
- Highest elevation: 629.23 m (2,064.4 ft)

Population (2023)
  - Total: 24,404
  - Rank: #53 in Norway
  - Density: 279.1/km^{2} (723/sq mi)
  - Change (10 years): ▲ +0.04%
- Demonym(s): Kristiansunder; Kristiansundar

Official language
  - Norwegian form: Bokmål
- Time zone: UTC+01:00 (CET)
  - Summer (DST): UTC+02:00 (CEST)
- ISO 3166 code: NO-1505
- Website: Official website

Kristiansund (US: /ˈkrɪstʃənsʌnd, ˈkrɪstiənsʊn/, Norwegian: [krɪstjɑnˈsʉnː]; historically spelled Christianssund and earlier named Fosna) is a municipality on the western coast of Norway in the Nordmøre district of Møre og Romsdal county. The administrative center of the municipality is the town of Kristiansund (established in 1742), which is the major town for the whole Nordmøre region. Other notable settlements in the municipality include the villages of Kvalvåg, Rensvik, and Nedre Frei.

The 87-square-kilometre (34 sq mi) municipality is the 334th largest by area out of the 357 municipalities in Norway. Kristiansund Municipality is the 53rd most populous municipality in Norway with a population of 24,404. The municipality's population density is 279.1 inhabitants per square kilometre (723/sq mi) and its population has increased by 0.04% over the previous 10-year period.

== General information ==
The parish of Christianssund was established as a municipality on 1 January 1838 (see formannskapsdistrikt law). Initially, the small island municipality included just the town of Christianssund and its immediate surrounding area. During the 1960s, there were many municipal mergers across Norway due to the work of the Schei Committee. On 1 January 1964, Kristiansund Municipality was merged with the tiny Grip Municipality (population: 104), an island municipality to the northwest and the Dale area of Bremsnes Municipality on Nordlandet island (population: 963). The neighbouring Frei Municipality was merged with Kristiansund on 1 January 2008 creating a much larger Kristiansund Municipality.

=== Toponymy ===
The municipality is named after the town of Kristiansund. Historically, it was spelled Christianssund. The first element of the name comes from the Danish-Norwegian King Christian VI who founded the town in 1742. The last element of the name is sund which means "strait" or "sound". The old name of the town/village (originally the island Kirkelandet) was Fosna or Fosen (Old Norse: fólgsn) which means "hiding place" (here 'hidden port'). It was also often named Lille Fosen ("the small Fosen") to distinguish it from the island Storfosna ("the big Fosen") in Ørland.

Before 1877, the name was spelled Christianssund, from 1877 to 1888 it was spelled Kristianssund, and since 1889 it has had its present spelling, Kristiansund.

Before the introduction of postal codes in Norway in 1968, it was easy to confuse the name Kristiansund with Kristiansand in the south. It was therefore obligatory to always add an N (for north) to Kristiansund (Kristiansund N) and an S (for south) to Kristiansand (Kristiansand S). This is pretty much still practiced and also occurs in some other contexts than postal addresses.

=== Coat of arms ===
The municipality's coat of arms were granted on 27 June 1742 by King Christian VI. They are described as a silver or white river flowing from a cliff, with salmon swimming upwards on a blue background. The waterfall is most likely based on a misinterpretaion of the old name for the town Fosen, as it resembles the Norwegian word for "waterfall". A replica of the waterfall shown in the arms was eventually constructed in 1992 for Kristiansund's 250th anniversary.

=== Churches ===
The Church of Norway has three parishes (sokn) within Kristiansund Municipality. It is part of the Ytre Nordmøre prosti (deanery) in the Diocese of Møre.

Churches in Kristiansund Municipality
| Parish (sokn) | Church name | Location of the church | Year built |
|---|---|---|---|
| Kristiansund | Kirkelandet Church | Kirklandet island | 1964 |
| Kristiansund | Grip Stave Church | Grip island | 1470 |
| Nordlandet | Nordlandet Church | Nordlandet island | 1914 |
| Frei | Frei Church | Nedre Frei | 1897 |

St. Eystein Catholic Church is the only Catholic church in Kristiansund.

== Geography ==
The municipality borders Smøla Municipality and Aure Municipality to the northeast, Tingvoll Municipality to the east, Gjemnes Municipality to the south, and Averøy Municipality to the southwest. The small Grip archipelago is located in the northwestern part of the municipality. The municipality is surrounded by the Freifjorden and Kvernesfjorden with the open sea to the northwest.

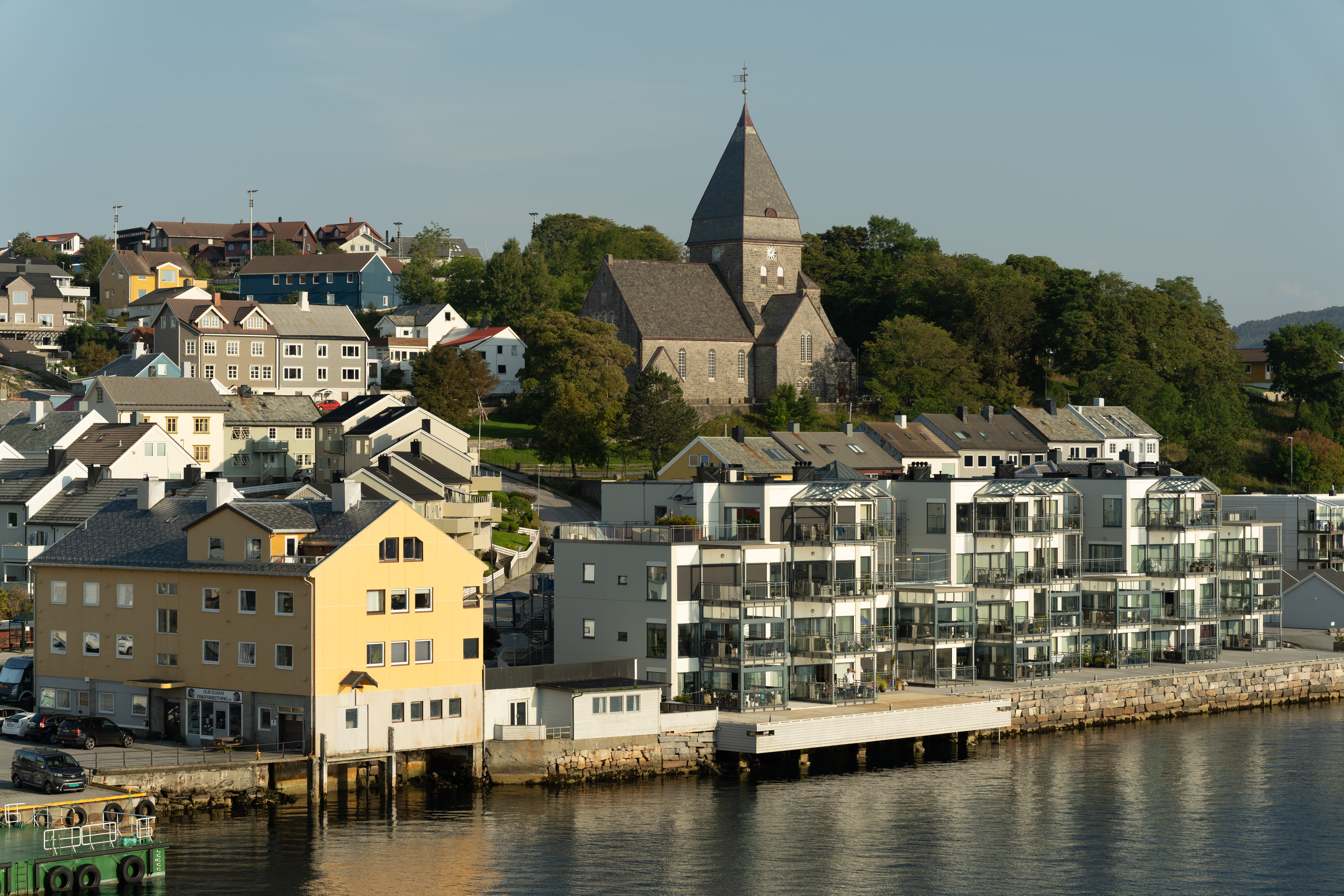
The island of "Nordlandet" in Kristiansund.

The town of Kristiansund is built on four main islands, with many smaller islands. The island of Nordlandet ("North Land", humorously nicknamed Marokko), is the second largest island and the site of the local airport, Kristiansund Airport, Kvernberget (IATA code: KSU). Kirklandet, third in size is made up of two areas Kirkelandet and Gomalandet. In the local dialect, Kirkelandet (the "Church Land") is pronounced "Kirklandet", without the middle e. The smallest island is Innlandet ("Innermost Land"; humorously, "Tahiti"). The largest island in the municipality is Frei which was part of the old Frei Municipality which was merged into Kristiansund on 1 January 2008. The highest point of the municipality is located on Frei island, Freikollen at a height of 629 metres (2,064 ft).

The islands of Grip, located northwest of Kristiansund are also a part of the municipality. Grip Municipality was Norway's smallest municipality, and also one of the most remote until it merged with Kristiansund in 1964. Today the island of Grip holds status as a deserted fishing village, but in the summer season it is a popular tourist attraction due to the very special location and architecture. Grip Stave Church, the second smallest stave church of Norway (Undredal Stave Church is smaller), is also located at Grip. It is also where Grip Lighthouse is located.

Kristiansund includes the town of Kristiansund which is one of the most densely populated cities of Norway, having what is arguably the country's most urban small city centre, due to the relatively small size of the islands on which it is built and the very constricted central harbor/town area of Kirkelandet.

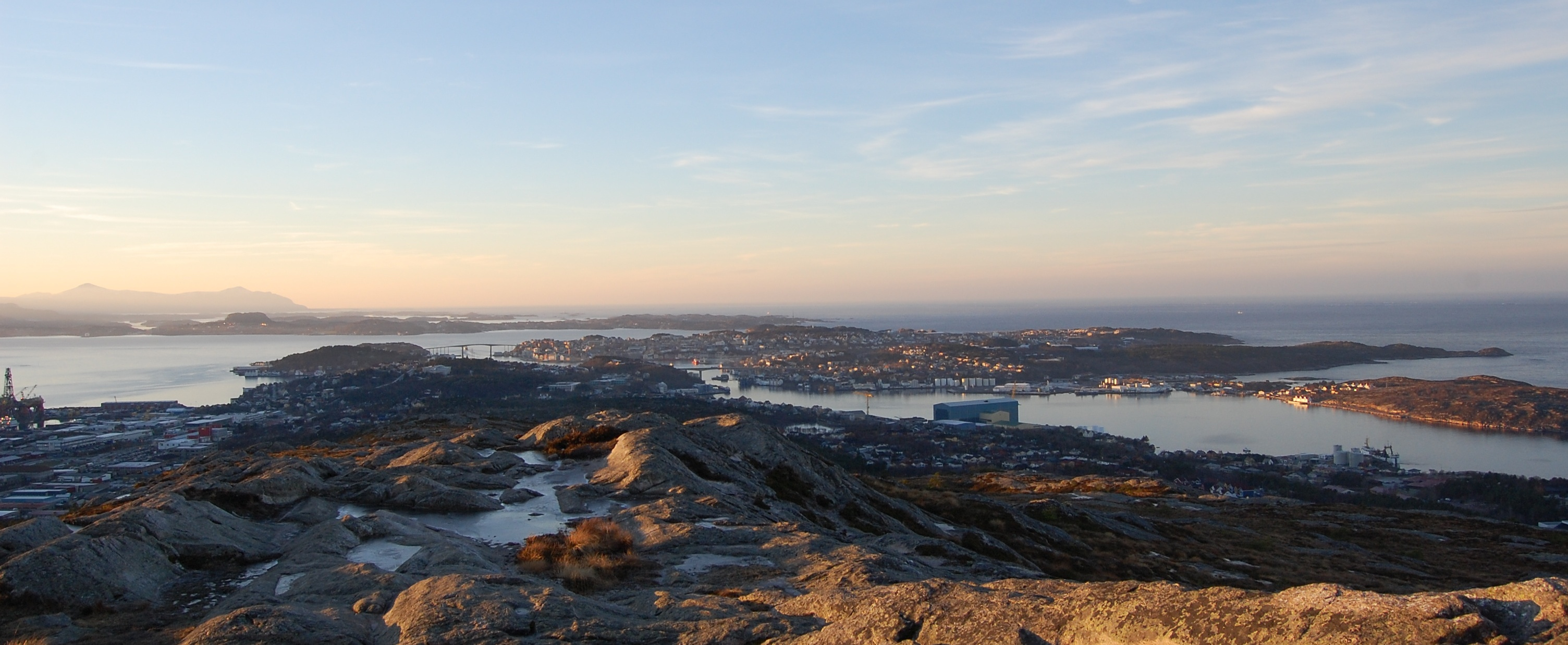
Parts of Kristiansund seen from Kvernberget

== History ==
=== 8000 BC–1066 ===
Archeological evidence exists of settlement in the area which is now Kristiansund from as early as 8000 BCE. At the end of the last ice age some areas at the western coast of Norway were ice-free. The first evidence of such settlements were discovered at Voldvatnet in Kristiansund in 1909. More have since been found, a discovery at Kvernberget in 2007 when archeological digs were conducted before the extension of the city's airport. Finds have also been discovered from the Bronze Age, and early Iron Age.

During the Viking era, there were many battles around Kristiansund. The most famous one was the Battle of Rastarkalv on the island of Frei, where the Norwegian King Håkon the Good fought against the Eirikssønnene group. There is now a monument located near at Nedre Frei, where the battle was fought.

=== Middle Ages ===
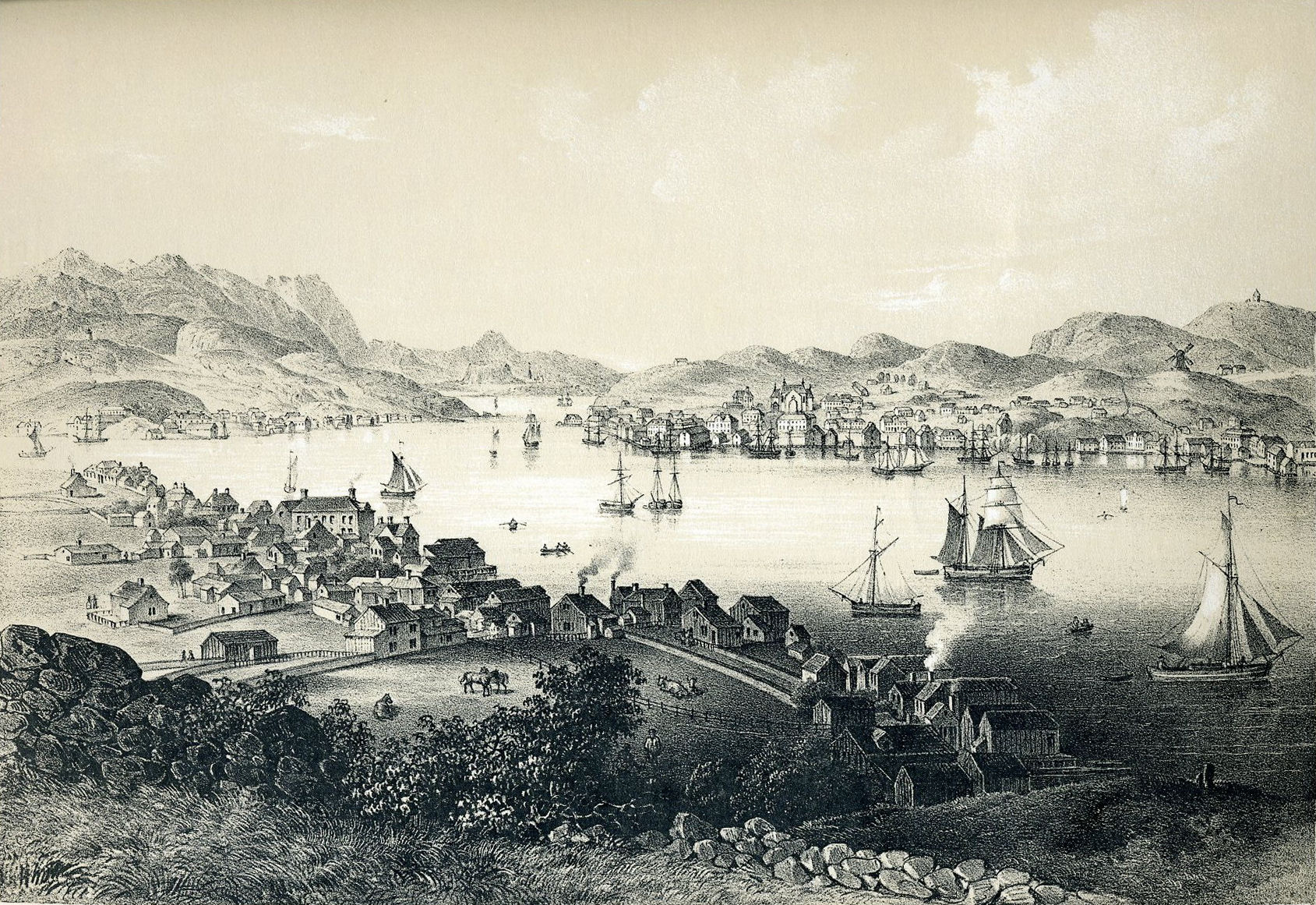
A picture of Christianssund from the early 1840s.

The island of Grip was an important fishing community during the Middle Ages, and was considered to be the most important municipality in the region at the time. The natural harbour in Lille-fosen, close to where Kristiansund is located today was also frequently used for fishing purposes.

=== 17th to 18th century ===
During the 17th century, a small settlement developed around the area we know today as Kristiansund harbour. As more and more settlers arrived, the area became an important trading port for fishing and the lumber transportation along the coast. The Dano-Norwegian government established a customs station here, which was controlled by the main trading port in Trondheim. In 1631, the port was declared to be a ladested.

Dutch sailors brought the knowledge of clipfish production to Kristiansund at the end of the 17th century, and for a number of years the town was the largest exporter of clipfish in Norway, exporting goods mainly to the Mediterranean countries as Spain and Portugal. The city's clipfish production was also part of the reason why it was given town status as a kjøpstad in 1742.

=== 19th century to present ===
Map of Kristiansund (1964-2008)

The town of Christianssund was established as the municipality of Christianssund on 1 January 1838 (see formannskapsdistrikt law).

Kristiansund was bombed from 28 April to 1 May 1940, during the German occupation of Norway in World War II. German air raids destroyed around 800 buildings, causing major damage and killing six people. In 1944, Royal Air Force planes accidentally hit civilian homes during a bombing raid, killing 12.

During the 1960s, there were many municipal mergers across Norway due to the work of the Schei Committee. On 1 January 1964, Kristiansund Municipality was merged with the tiny Grip Municipality (population: 104) to the northwest and the Dale area of Bremsnes Municipality on Nordlandet island (population: 963). The neighbouring Frei Municipality was merged with Kristiansund on 1 January 2008 creating a much larger Kristiansund Municipality.

== Media ==
The local newspaper of Kristiansund is Tidens Krav, which also functions as a semi-regional newspaper for the other municipalities located nearby the city. Other online newspapers for the city exists, such as KSU.no. A local radio station, also named KSU 24/7, was founded in 2016.

== Climate ==
Kristiansund has a temperate oceanic climate (Cfb) with cool-to-warm summers and mild winters. The city structure with the unique natural harbour of the city combined with Atlantic air from the southwest and the Gulf Stream gives Kristiansund a much warmer climate than its latitude would indicate. The all-time high 32 °C (90 °F) was set on 28 July 2018. The warmest month on record at Kristiansund Airport was July 2014 with mean 17.1 °C (62.8 °F) and average daily high 21.9 °C (71.4 °F). The all-time low −14.3 °C (6.3 °F) was recorded on 23 February 2010. The coldest month on record at Kristiansund Airport was December 2010 with mean −2.7 °C (27.1 °F) and average daily low −4.9 °C (23.2 °F). The coldest month recorded at earlier weather stations in Kristiansund was February 1947 with mean −3.6 °C (25.5 °F) (recordings since 1871).

Climate data for Kristiansund Airport 1991-2020 (62 m, precipitation from Karihola, extremes 2002-2025)
| Month | Jan | Feb | Mar | Apr | May | Jun | Jul | Aug | Sep | Oct | Nov | Dec | Year |
|---|---|---|---|---|---|---|---|---|---|---|---|---|---|
| Record high °C (°F) | 15.7 (60.3) | 15.4 (59.7) | 15.7 (60.3) | 22.8 (73.0) | 28.6 (83.5) | 29.9 (85.8) | 32 (90) | 28.7 (83.7) | 24.7 (76.5) | 24.3 (75.7) | 17.6 (63.7) | 14.7 (58.5) | 32 (90) |
| Mean daily maximum °C (°F) | 4 (39) | 4 (39) | 6 (43) | 9 (48) | 12 (54) | 15 (59) | 18 (64) | 18 (64) | 15 (59) | 11 (52) | 7 (45) | 4 (39) | 10 (50) |
| Daily mean °C (°F) | 2.1 (35.8) | 1.6 (34.9) | 2.8 (37.0) | 5.6 (42.1) | 8.5 (47.3) | 11.4 (52.5) | 14.3 (57.7) | 14.2 (57.6) | 11.5 (52.7) | 7.2 (45.0) | 4.6 (40.3) | 2.3 (36.1) | 7.2 (44.9) |
| Mean daily minimum °C (°F) | 0 (32) | 0 (32) | 1 (34) | 3 (37) | 6 (43) | 9 (48) | 12 (54) | 12 (54) | 9 (48) | 6 (43) | 3 (37) | 1 (34) | 5 (41) |
| Record low °C (°F) | −11.4 (11.5) | −14.3 (6.3) | −10.2 (13.6) | −3.7 (25.3) | −2.5 (27.5) | 1.3 (34.3) | 5.6 (42.1) | 3.5 (38.3) | 2.2 (36.0) | −4.9 (23.2) | −8.5 (16.7) | −10.5 (13.1) | −14.3 (6.3) |
| Average precipitation mm (inches) | 93 (3.7) | 95 (3.7) | 85 (3.3) | 58 (2.3) | 49 (1.9) | 63 (2.5) | 71 (2.8) | 93 (3.7) | 122 (4.8) | 96 (3.8) | 94 (3.7) | 103 (4.1) | 1,022 (40.3) |
Source 1: Norwegian Meteorological Institute
Source 2: Weatheronline.co.uk

== Government ==
Kristiansund Municipality is responsible for primary education (through 10th grade), outpatient health services, senior citizen services, welfare and other social services, zoning, economic development, and municipal roads and utilities. The municipality is governed by a municipal council of directly elected representatives. The mayor is indirectly elected by a vote of the municipal council. The municipality is under the jurisdiction of the Nordmøre og Romsdal District Court and the Frostating Court of Appeal. Waste management was provided by the inter-municipal agency Nordmøre Interkommunale Renovasjonsselskap until 2020, after which it merged into ReMidt. Waste collection has since 2018 been operated by ReTrans Midt.

=== Municipal council ===
The municipal council (Bystyre) of Kristiansund Municipality is made up of 45 representatives that are elected to four-year terms. The tables below show the current and historical composition of the council by political party.

Kristiansund kommunestyre 2023–2027
| Party name (in Norwegian) | Number of representatives |
|---|---|
| Labour Party (Arbeiderpartiet) | 10 |
| Progress Party (Fremskrittspartiet) | 5 |
| Green Party (Miljøpartiet De Grønne) | 1 |
| Conservative Party (Høyre) | 3 |
| Industry and Business Party (Industri‑ og Næringspartiet) | 3 |
| Red Party (Rødt) | 3 |
| Centre Party (Senterpartiet) | 3 |
| Socialist Left Party (Sosialistisk Venstreparti) | 2 |
| Liberal Party (Venstre) | 10 |
| Nordmøre List (Nordmørslista) | 5 |
| Total number of members: | 45 |

Kristiansund bystyre 2019–2023
| Party name (in Norwegian) | Number of representatives |
|---|---|
| Labour Party (Arbeiderpartiet) | 16 |
| Progress Party (Fremskrittspartiet) | 2 |
| Green Party (Miljøpartiet De Grønne) | 2 |
| Conservative Party (Høyre) | 2 |
| Red Party (Rødt) | 4 |
| Centre Party (Senterpartiet) | 8 |
| Socialist Left Party (Sosialistisk Venstreparti) | 1 |
| Liberal Party (Venstre) | 2 |
| Nordmøre List (Nordmørslista) | 8 |
| Total number of members: | 45 |

Kristiansund kommunestyre 2015–2019
| Party name (in Norwegian) | Number of representatives |
|---|---|
| Labour Party (Arbeiderpartiet) | 16 |
| Progress Party (Fremskrittspartiet) | 7 |
| Green Party (Miljøpartiet De Grønne) | 2 |
| Conservative Party (Høyre) | 3 |
| Christian Democratic Party (Kristelig Folkeparti) | 1 |
| Red Party (Rødt) | 2 |
| Centre Party (Senterpartiet) | 11 |
| Socialist Left Party (Sosialistisk Venstreparti) | 1 |
| Liberal Party (Venstre) | 2 |
| Total number of members: | 45 |

Kristiansund kommunestyre 2011–2015
| Party name (in Norwegian) | Number of representatives |
|---|---|
| Labour Party (Arbeiderpartiet) | 23 |
| Progress Party (Fremskrittspartiet) | 8 |
| Conservative Party (Høyre) | 8 |
| Christian Democratic Party (Kristelig Folkeparti) | 1 |
| Red Party (Rødt) | 1 |
| Centre Party (Senterpartiet) | 1 |
| Socialist Left Party (Sosialistisk Venstreparti) | 1 |
| Liberal Party (Venstre) | 2 |
| Total number of members: | 45 |

Kristiansund kommunestyre 2007–2011
| Party name (in Norwegian) | Number of representatives |
|---|---|
| Labour Party (Arbeiderpartiet) | 20 |
| Progress Party (Fremskrittspartiet) | 8 |
| Conservative Party (Høyre) | 8 |
| Christian Democratic Party (Kristelig Folkeparti) | 2 |
| Red Electoral Alliance (Rød Valgallianse) | 1 |
| Centre Party (Senterpartiet) | 3 |
| Socialist Left Party (Sosialistisk Venstreparti) | 1 |
| Liberal Party (Venstre) | 2 |
| Total number of members: | 45 |

Kristiansund kommunestyre 2003–2007
| Party name (in Norwegian) | Number of representatives |
|---|---|
| Labour Party (Arbeiderpartiet) | 16 |
| Progress Party (Fremskrittspartiet) | 5 |
| Conservative Party (Høyre) | 18 |
| Christian Democratic Party (Kristelig Folkeparti) | 1 |
| Socialist Left Party (Sosialistisk Venstreparti) | 3 |
| Liberal Party (Venstre) | 2 |
| Total number of members: | 45 |

Kristiansund kommunestyre 1999–2003
| Party name (in Norwegian) | Number of representatives |
|---|---|
| Labour Party (Arbeiderpartiet) | 17 |
| Progress Party (Fremskrittspartiet) | 2 |
| Conservative Party (Høyre) | 21 |
| Christian Democratic Party (Kristelig Folkeparti) | 2 |
| Socialist Left Party (Sosialistisk Venstreparti) | 2 |
| Liberal Party (Venstre) | 1 |
| Total number of members: | 45 |

Kristiansund kommunestyre 1995–1999
| Party name (in Norwegian) | Number of representatives |
|---|---|
| Labour Party (Arbeiderpartiet) | 18 |
| Progress Party (Fremskrittspartiet) | 3 |
| Conservative Party (Høyre) | 10 |
| Christian Democratic Party (Kristelig Folkeparti) | 7 |
| Pensioners' Party (Pensjonistpartiet) | 2 |
| Socialist Left Party (Sosialistisk Venstreparti) | 2 |
| Liberal Party (Venstre) | 3 |
| Total number of members: | 45 |

Kristiansund kommunestyre 1991–1995
| Party name (in Norwegian) | Number of representatives |
|---|---|
| Labour Party (Arbeiderpartiet) | 20 |
| Progress Party (Fremskrittspartiet) | 1 |
| Conservative Party (Høyre) | 13 |
| Christian Democratic Party (Kristelig Folkeparti) | 3 |
| Red Electoral Alliance (Rød Valgallianse) | 1 |
| Socialist Left Party (Sosialistisk Venstreparti) | 4 |
| Liberal Party (Venstre) | 3 |
| Total number of members: | 45 |

Kristiansund kommunestyre 1987–1991
| Party name (in Norwegian) | Number of representatives |
|---|---|
| Labour Party (Arbeiderpartiet) | 31 |
| Progress Party (Fremskrittspartiet) | 5 |
| Conservative Party (Høyre) | 15 |
| Christian Democratic Party (Kristelig Folkeparti) | 3 |
| Red Electoral Alliance (Rød Valgallianse) | 1 |
| Socialist Left Party (Sosialistisk Venstreparti) | 2 |
| Liberal Party (Venstre) | 4 |
| Total number of members: | 61 |

Kristiansund kommunestyre 1983–1987
| Party name (in Norwegian) | Number of representatives |
|---|---|
| Labour Party (Arbeiderpartiet) | 32 |
| Progress Party (Fremskrittspartiet) | 3 |
| Conservative Party (Høyre) | 15 |
| Christian Democratic Party (Kristelig Folkeparti) | 4 |
| Socialist Left Party (Sosialistisk Venstreparti) | 2 |
| Liberal Party (Venstre) | 5 |
| Total number of members: | 61 |

Kristiansund kommunestyre 1979–1983
| Party name (in Norwegian) | Number of representatives |
|---|---|
| Labour Party (Arbeiderpartiet) | 28 |
| Conservative Party (Høyre) | 17 |
| Christian Democratic Party (Kristelig Folkeparti) | 4 |
| Centre Party (Senterpartiet) | 1 |
| Socialist Left Party (Sosialistisk Venstreparti) | 2 |
| Liberal Party (Venstre) | 9 |
| Total number of members: | 61 |

Kristiansund kommunestyre 1975–1979
| Party name (in Norwegian) | Number of representatives |
|---|---|
| Labour Party (Arbeiderpartiet) | 28 |
| Conservative Party (Høyre) | 14 |
| Christian Democratic Party (Kristelig Folkeparti) | 5 |
| Centre Party (Senterpartiet) | 1 |
| Socialist Left Party (Sosialistisk Venstreparti) | 3 |
| Liberal Party (Venstre) | 10 |
| Total number of members: | 61 |

Kristiansund kommunestyre 1971–1975
| Party name (in Norwegian) | Number of representatives |
|---|---|
| Labour Party (Arbeiderpartiet) | 25 |
| Conservative Party (Høyre) | 10 |
| Christian Democratic Party (Kristelig Folkeparti) | 5 |
| Centre Party (Senterpartiet) | 1 |
| Liberal Party (Venstre) | 13 |
| Socialist common list (Venstresosialistiske felleslister) | 7 |
| Total number of members: | 61 |

Kristiansund kommunestyre 1967–1971
| Party name (in Norwegian) | Number of representatives |
|---|---|
| Labour Party (Arbeiderpartiet) | 30 |
| Conservative Party (Høyre) | 12 |
| Communist Party (Kommunistiske Parti) | 1 |
| Christian Democratic Party (Kristelig Folkeparti) | 4 |
| Socialist People's Party (Sosialistisk Folkeparti) | 2 |
| Liberal Party (Venstre) | 12 |
| Total number of members: | 61 |

Kristiansund kommunestyre 1963–1967
| Party name (in Norwegian) | Number of representatives |
|---|---|
| Labour Party (Arbeiderpartiet) | 30 |
| Conservative Party (Høyre) | 13 |
| Communist Party (Kommunistiske Parti) | 2 |
| Christian Democratic Party (Kristelig Folkeparti) | 6 |
| Socialist People's Party (Sosialistisk Folkeparti) | 1 |
| Liberal Party (Venstre) | 9 |
| Total number of members: | 61 |

Kristiansund bystyre 1959–1963
| Party name (in Norwegian) | Number of representatives |
|---|---|
| Labour Party (Arbeiderpartiet) | 26 |
| Conservative Party (Høyre) | 13 |
| Communist Party (Kommunistiske Parti) | 4 |
| Christian Democratic Party (Kristelig Folkeparti) | 5 |
| Liberal Party (Venstre) | 8 |
| New-Day Workers' Team (Ny-Dag arbeiderlaget) | 5 |
| Total number of members: | 61 |

Kristiansund bystyre 1955–1959
| Party name (in Norwegian) | Number of representatives |
|---|---|
| Labour Party (Arbeiderpartiet) | 32 |
| Conservative Party (Høyre) | 12 |
| Communist Party (Kommunistiske Parti) | 5 |
| Christian Democratic Party (Kristelig Folkeparti) | 5 |
| Liberal Party (Venstre) | 7 |
| Total number of members: | 61 |

Kristiansund bystyre 1951–1955
| Party name (in Norwegian) | Number of representatives |
|---|---|
| Labour Party (Arbeiderpartiet) | 25 |
| Conservative Party (Høyre) | 11 |
| Communist Party (Kommunistiske Parti) | 4 |
| Christian Democratic Party (Kristelig Folkeparti) | 4 |
| Liberal Party (Venstre) | 8 |
| Total number of members: | 52 |

Kristiansund bystyre 1947–1951
| Party name (in Norwegian) | Number of representatives |
|---|---|
| Labour Party (Arbeiderpartiet) | 23 |
| Communist Party (Kommunistiske Parti) | 6 |
| Christian Democratic Party (Kristelig Folkeparti) | 4 |
| Liberal Party (Venstre) | 8 |
| Joint List(s) of Non-Socialist Parties (Borgerlige Felleslister) | 11 |
| Total number of members: | 52 |

Kristiansund bystyre 1945–1947
| Party name (in Norwegian) | Number of representatives |
|---|---|
| Labour Party (Arbeiderpartiet) | 20 |
| Communist Party (Kommunistiske Parti) | 11 |
| Christian Democratic Party (Kristelig Folkeparti) | 4 |
| Liberal Party (Venstre) | 4 |
| Local List(s) (Lokale lister) | 13 |
| Total number of members: | 52 |

Kristiansund bystyre 1937–1941*
| Party name (in Norwegian) | Number of representatives |
|---|---|
| Labour Party (Arbeiderpartiet) | 25 |
| Communist Party (Kommunistiske Parti) | 3 |
| Liberal Party (Venstre) | 6 |
| Joint List(s) of Non-Socialist Parties (Borgerlige Felleslister) | 18 |
| Total number of members: | 52 |
Note: Due to the German occupation of Norway during World War II, no elections were held for new municipal councils until after the war ended in 1945.

Kristiansund bystyre 1934–1937
| Party name (in Norwegian) | Number of representatives |
|---|---|
| Labour Party (Arbeiderpartiet) | 27 |
| Free-minded People's Party (Frisinnede Folkeparti) | 1 |
| Communist Party (Kommunistiske Parti) | 1 |
| Liberal Party (Venstre) | 6 |
| Joint List(s) of Non-Socialist Parties (Borgerlige Felleslister) | 17 |
| Total number of members: | 52 |

Kristiansund bystyre 1931–1934
| Party name (in Norwegian) | Number of representatives |
|---|---|
| Labour Party (Arbeiderpartiet) | 22 |
| Temperance Party (Avholdspartiet) | 3 |
| Free-minded People's Party (Frisinnede Folkeparti) | 6 |
| Conservative Party (Høyre) | 16 |
| Liberal Party (Venstre) | 5 |
| Total number of members: | 52 |

Kristiansund bystyre 1928–1931
| Party name (in Norwegian) | Number of representatives |
|---|---|
| Labour Party (Arbeiderpartiet) | 26 |
| Temperance Party (Avholdspartiet) | 5 |
| Communist Party (Kommunistiske Parti) | 1 |
| Liberal Party (Venstre) | 4 |
| Joint List(s) of Non-Socialist Parties (Borgerlige Felleslister) | 21 |
| Local List(s) (Lokale lister) | 3 |
| Total number of members: | 60 |

Kristiansund bystyre 1925–1928
| Party name (in Norwegian) | Number of representatives |
|---|---|
| Labour Party (Arbeiderpartiet) | 20 |
| Temperance Party (Avholdspartiet) | 5 |
| Social Democratic Labour Party (Socialdemokratiske Arbeiderparti) | 5 |
| Liberal Party (Venstre) | 1 |
| Joint List(s) of Non-Socialist Parties (Borgerlige Felleslister) | 29 |
| Total number of members: | 60 |

Kristiansund bystyre 1922–1925
| Party name (in Norwegian) | Number of representatives |
|---|---|
| Labour Party (Arbeiderpartiet) | 21 |
| Temperance Party (Avholdspartiet) | 4 |
| Social Democratic Labour Party (Socialdemokratiske Arbeiderparti) | 8 |
| Liberal Party (Venstre) | 1 |
| Joint list of the Conservative Party (Høyre) and the Free-minded Liberal Party (Frisinnede Venstre) | 26 |
| Total number of members: | 60 |

Kristiansund bystyre 1919–1922
| Party name (in Norwegian) | Number of representatives |
|---|---|
| Labour Party (Arbeiderpartiet) | 19 |
| Temperance Party (Avholdspartiet) | 10 |
| Free-minded Liberal Party (Frisinnede Venstre) | 3 |
| Conservative Party (Høyre) | 6 |
| Liberal Party (Venstre) | 11 |
| Local List(s) (Lokale lister) | 3 |
| Total number of members: | 52 |

=== Mayor ===
The mayor (Norwegian: ordfører) of Kristiansund Municipality is the political leader of the municipality and the chairperson of the municipal council. Here is a list of people who have held this position:

- 1838–1838: Hans Herluf Dahl
- 1839–1842: Jens Christian Schaanning
- 1843–1846: Hans Herluf Dahl
- 1847–1847: Jens Christian Schaanning
- 1848–1848: Morten Parelius
- 1849–1850: Jens Christian Schaanning
- 1851–1852: Claus Christian Olrog
- 1852–1853: Jens Christian Schaanning
- 1854–1856: Niels Rossing Parelius
- 1857–1859: Hans Herluf Dahl
- 1860–1861: Morten Parelius
- 1862–1862: Nicolay H. Knudtzon
- 1863–1866: Ernst David Thue
- 1867–1868: Jens Ludvig Paul Flor
- 1869–1869: Ernst David Thue
- 1870–1871: Rasmus Lossius
- 1872–1873: Christian Johnsen
- 1873–1874: Jens Ludvig Paul Flor
- 1875–1875: Ernst David Thue
- 1876–1876: Jens Ludvig Paul Flor
- 1877–1877: Ole Andreas Furu (H)
- 1878–1878: Ernst David Thue
- 1879–1885: Christian Johnsen (H)
- 1885–1888: Ole Andreas Furu (H)
- 1889–1891: Thomas Fasting (V)
- 1892–1894: Paul Christian Rønning (V)
- 1895–1896: Lars Gustav Aas (V)
- 1897–1897: Benedictus Heide (H)
- 1898–1898: Alf Peter Wessel-Thjøme (V)
- 1899–1900: Arne Arnesen (V)
- 1901–1910: Fredrik Selmer (V)
- 1911–1913: Jonas Hestnes (V)
- 1914–1916: Ivar O. Sundet (V)
- 1916–1917: Jonas Hestnes (V)
- 1917–1919: Robert Sæther (V)
- 1920–1921: Eileif Kolsrud (Ap)
- 1921–1922: Leif Bang (Ap)
- 1923–1925: Halvard Aase (FV)
- 1926–1926: Anton O. Næss (SmP)
- 1926–1934: Robert Sæther (SmP)
- 1935–1940: Ulrik Olsen (Ap)
- 1940–1942: Anton O. Næss (SmP)
- 1942–1943: Lorentz A. Lossius (NS)
- 1943–1945: Lars Kvendbø (NS)
- 1945–1945: Ulrik Olsen (Ap)
- 1946–1955: Ottar Guttelvik (Ap)
- 1956–1967: Worm Eide (Ap)
- 1968–1977: Asbjørn Jordahl (Ap)
- 1977–1979: Ole Stokke (Ap)
- 1980–1981: Otto Dyb (V)
- 1982–1983: Knut Engdahl (H)
- 1984–1989: Øivind Jensen (Ap)
- 1989–1995: Harald Martin Stokke (Ap)
- 1995–1997: Aud Inger Aure (KrF)
- 1997–2007: Dagfinn Ripnes (H)
- 2007–2015: Per Kristian Øyen (Ap)
- 2015–present: Kjell Neergaard (Ap)

=== Twin towns ===
Kirstiansund has sister city agreements with the following places:

- Kokkola, Finland
- Härnösand, Sweden
- Fredericia, Denmark

Together the three cities hold a tournament called Nordiske Dager ("Nordic Days").

== Parks and gardens ==
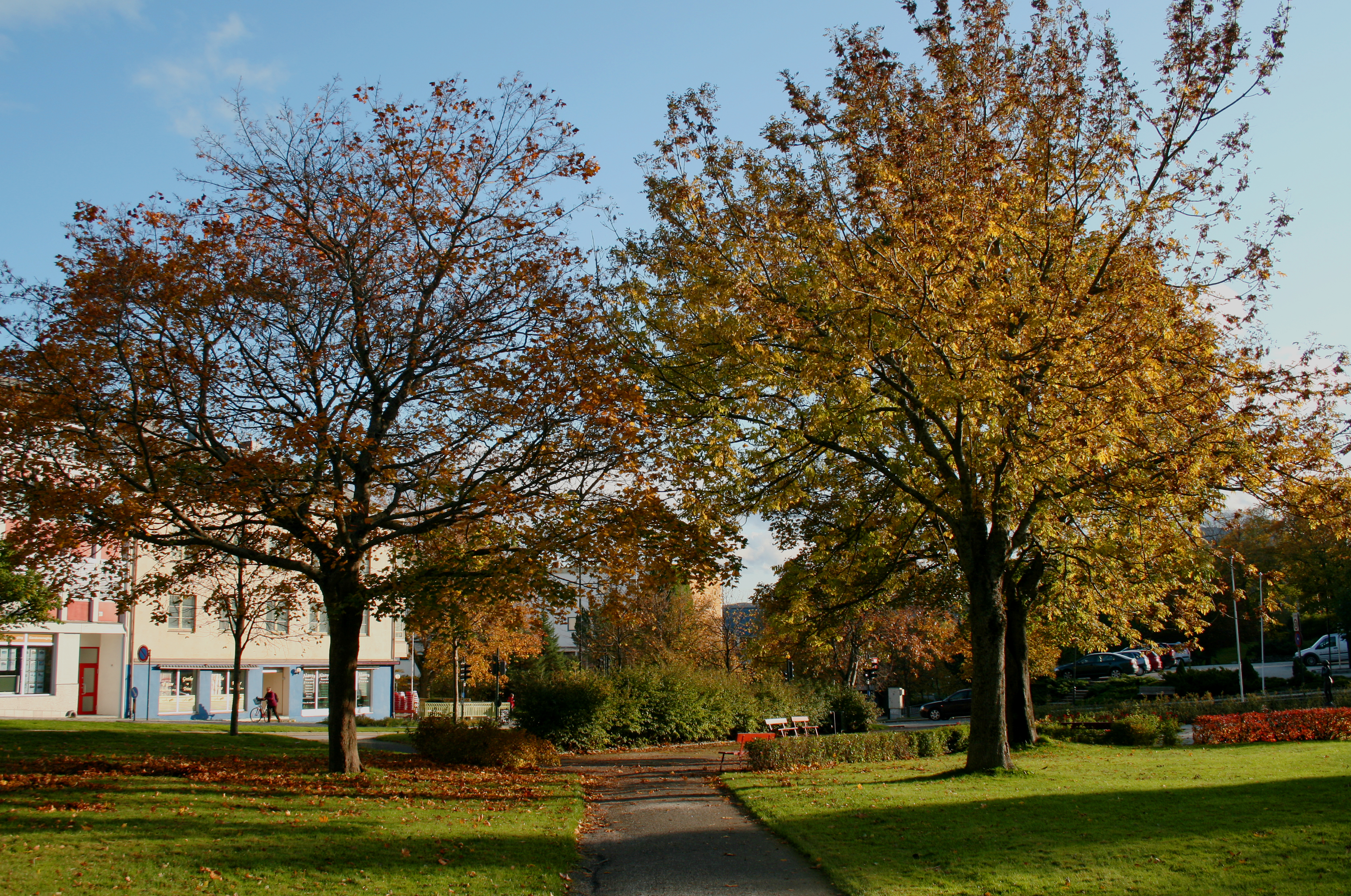
A small section of the Langveien-park.

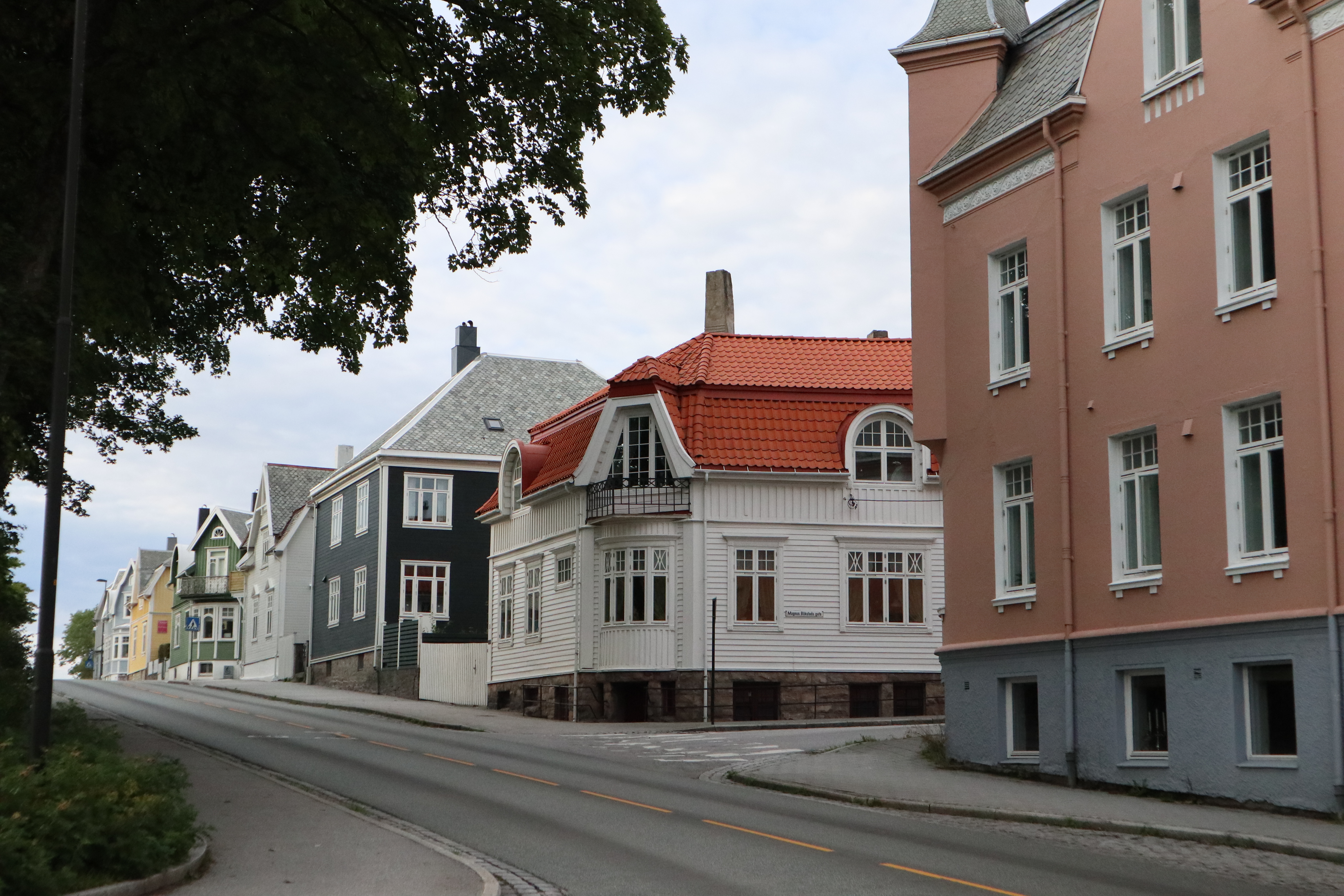
The street Magnus Blikstads gate

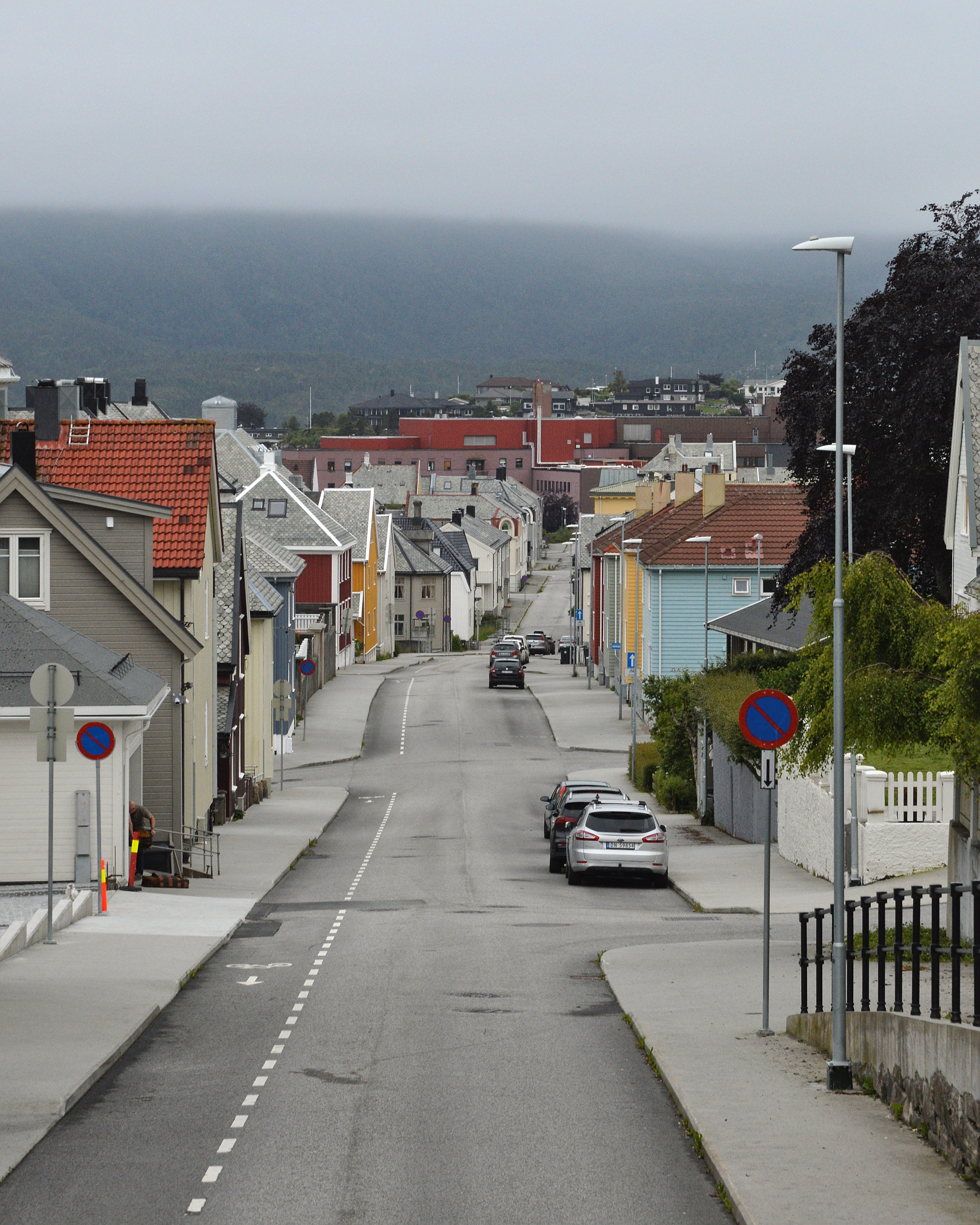
The street Johan P. Clausens Gate

Though fairly small in size, the city of Kristiansund contains many green parks and gardens, frequently used by the city's inhabitants. There are two larger parks near the city centre. The first one is located near Langveien, and was constructed in the aftermath of World War II . The second one is located in Vanndamman. This area used to be part of the city water supply, due to the large amount of small lakes in the area. (hence the name "Vanndamman" (The Water ponds)) The two parks are partly linked together, but the Langveien-park serve more as an urban recreation area due to the short walking distance from the city centre, while the Vanndamman-park is more suitable for outings and jogging.

== Transport ==
Started in 1876 and still going strong is the Sundbåt ("Sound Boat"/"Strait Crossing Boat") shuttle service with a capacity of a few tens of passengers, travelling between the islands. The small motor ferry crosses the harbour from Kirkelandet to Innlandet, then goes on to Nordlandet, to Gomalandet, and back to Kirkelandet, repeating the round trip in half-hour intervals morning to evening on weekdays. The Sundbåt bears the distinction of being the world's oldest motorized regular public transport system in continuous service.

The road to Kristiansund from the mainland, Norwegian National Road 70 is connected to European route E39 by the bridge/tunnel system called Krifast. After passing through the underwater Freifjord Tunnel from the central part of Krifast, National Road 70 crosses Frei, and enters Kristiansund over the Omsund Bridge onto Nordlandet. The Nordsund Bridge brings the Rv 70 to Gomalandet and its terminus in downtown at Kirkelandet. Another high bridge, the Sørsund Bridge, leads from Kirkelandet to Innlandet. E39 leads southwest to the town of Molde and northeast via the European route E6 to Trøndelag and the city of Trondheim.

There used to be a car ferry going from Kirkelandet island to neighbouring Averøy Municipality to the west, whose people have been commuting to town for many years for work as well as selling agricultural products. The ferry to Averøy connected Kristiansund to Norwegian National Road 64, which continued along the scenic Atlanterhavsvegen to Molde. The ferry was replaced by the 5.7-kilometre (3.5 mi) long underwater Atlantic Ocean Tunnel in December 2009. Because both tunnels are forbidden for cyclists, Kristiansund cannot easily be reached by bicycle.

A second car ferry goes from Seivika on Nordlandet to Tustna in the northeast (road: RV 680), with further road and ferry connections to the islands of Smøla and Hitra, and to Aure Municipality on the mainland.

Besides roads and car ferries and Kristiansund Airport, Kvernberget, connections to/from Kristiansund consist of the traditional coastal express Hurtigruten connecting coastal towns from Bergen in the south to Kirkenes in the north, and the high speed catamaran passenger service Kystekspressen to Trondheim. Another option to get to Kristiansund is to fly with Scandinavian Airlines from several other Norwegian cities.

== Commerce and industry ==
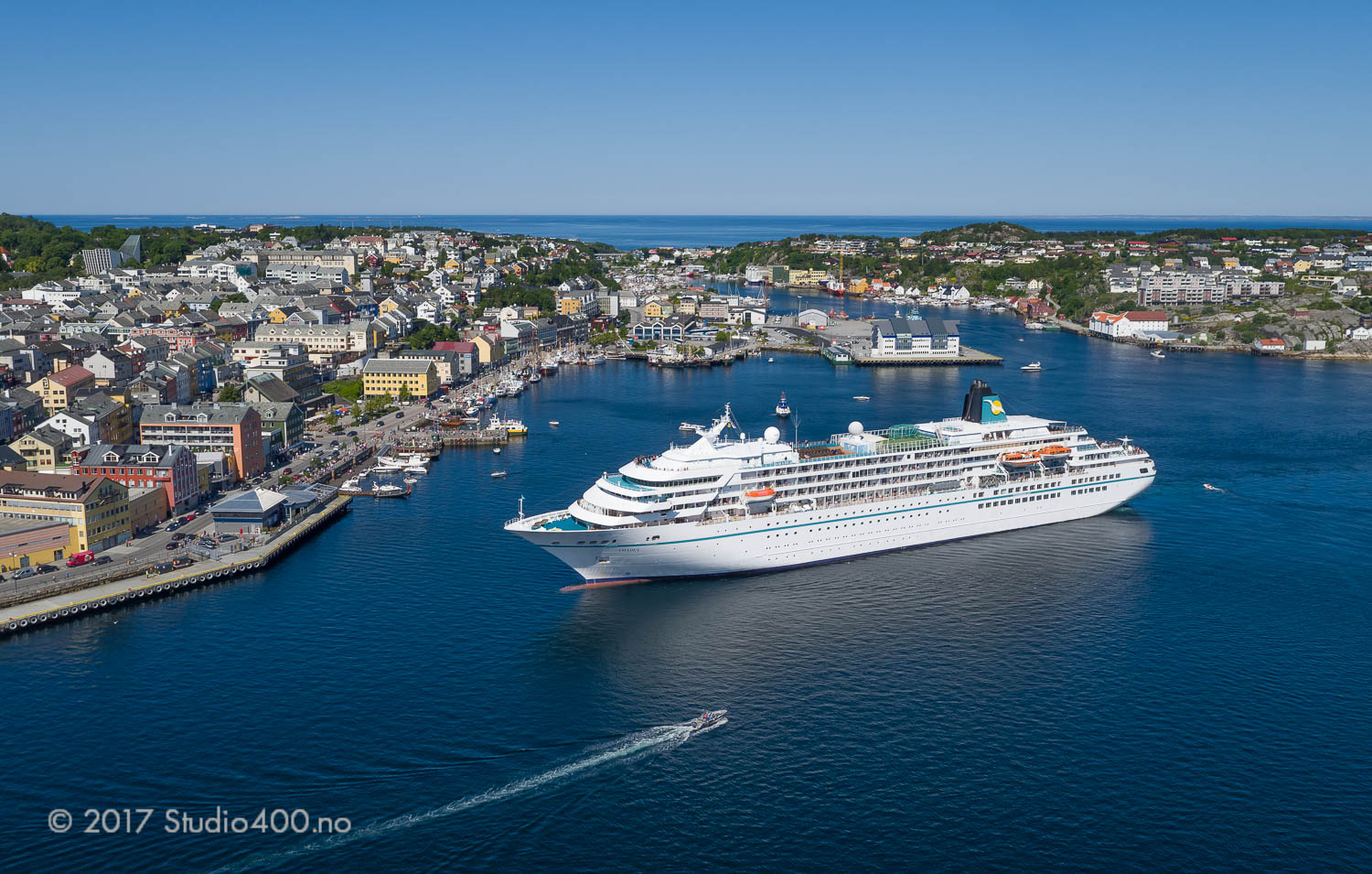
Kristiansund in 2017

Kristiansund is known as the major bacalhau city of Norway. Bacalhau is made of salted, dried codfish, and has traditionally been exported in large amounts to Spain, Portugal and Latin America as food suitable during Lent. In recent years Kristiansund has become the major oil and gas city at the mid-northwestern coast. Oil companies like Royal Dutch Shell and Statoil have offices in Kristiansund from where they serve their offshore installations at Haltenbanken (one of the northernmost underwater oil fields in the world).

Due to the city's heavy involvement in fish processing and international shipping, there used to be as many as seven consulates in Kristiansund, mainly to Latin countries. Currently, there are only five left: Britain, Finland, Latvia, the Netherlands, and Portugal.

== Culture and sports ==
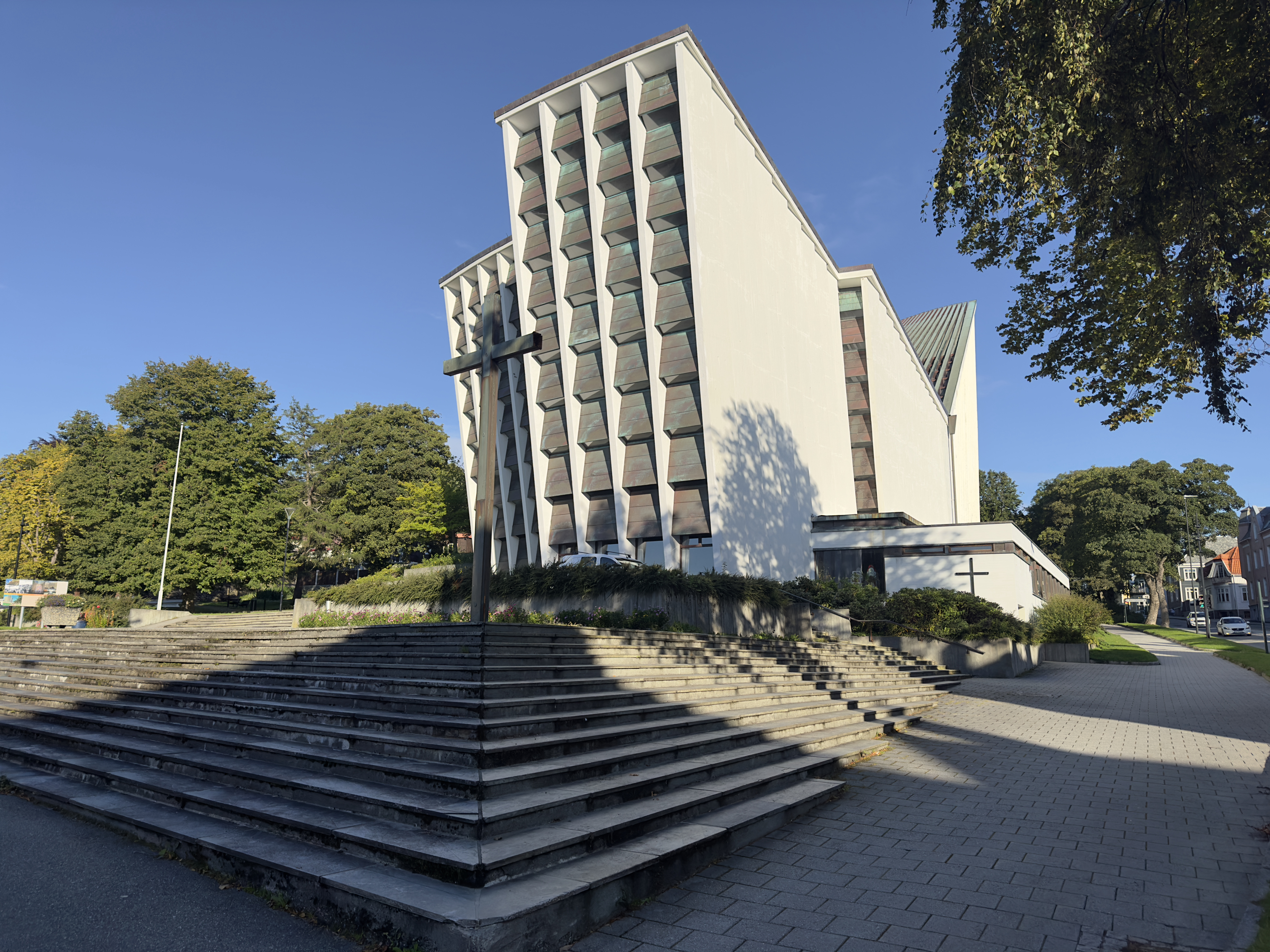
Kirkelandet Church in 2024. It was one of the first truly modern church buildings in Norway, constructed in the mid-1960s.

Kristiansund is an important cultural centre in the region of Nordmøre. The city is probably best known for housing one of Norway's oldest operas, which was established in 1928 by Edvard Bræin. There is an annual opera festival held every February in Kristiansund named The Opera Weeks (Operafestukene). In addition to this, Kristiansund is also host city of Northern Europes largest photo festival, Nordic Light. Even though this is a rather "young" festival, (Est. 2006) it has grown to become one of the most important of its kind in Europe, attracting famous photographers from all around the world, like Don McCullin, Jock Sturges and William Klein. Other smaller festivals held in Kristiansund include The Tahiti Festival and Kristiansund Church, Art and Culture Festival (shortened to the KKKK-festival in Norwegian).

Kristiansund's main football team, Kristiansund BK, is a result of the 2003 merger between the two largest football teams in the city, KFK and Clausenengen, which together with support from local businesses helped in creating a united elite club commitment. The club started at the 4th level (tredje divisjon) of the Norwegian football league system, and qualified for the 2017 season to play at the top level (Eliteserien). The team finished 7th in its first season at the top level, beating all expectation, and has since climbed upwards; Finishing 5th at the top level in 2020.

Other popular sports in Kristiansund include Volleyball, Wrestling, Swimming, Ice skating and Handball.

== Tourist attractions ==
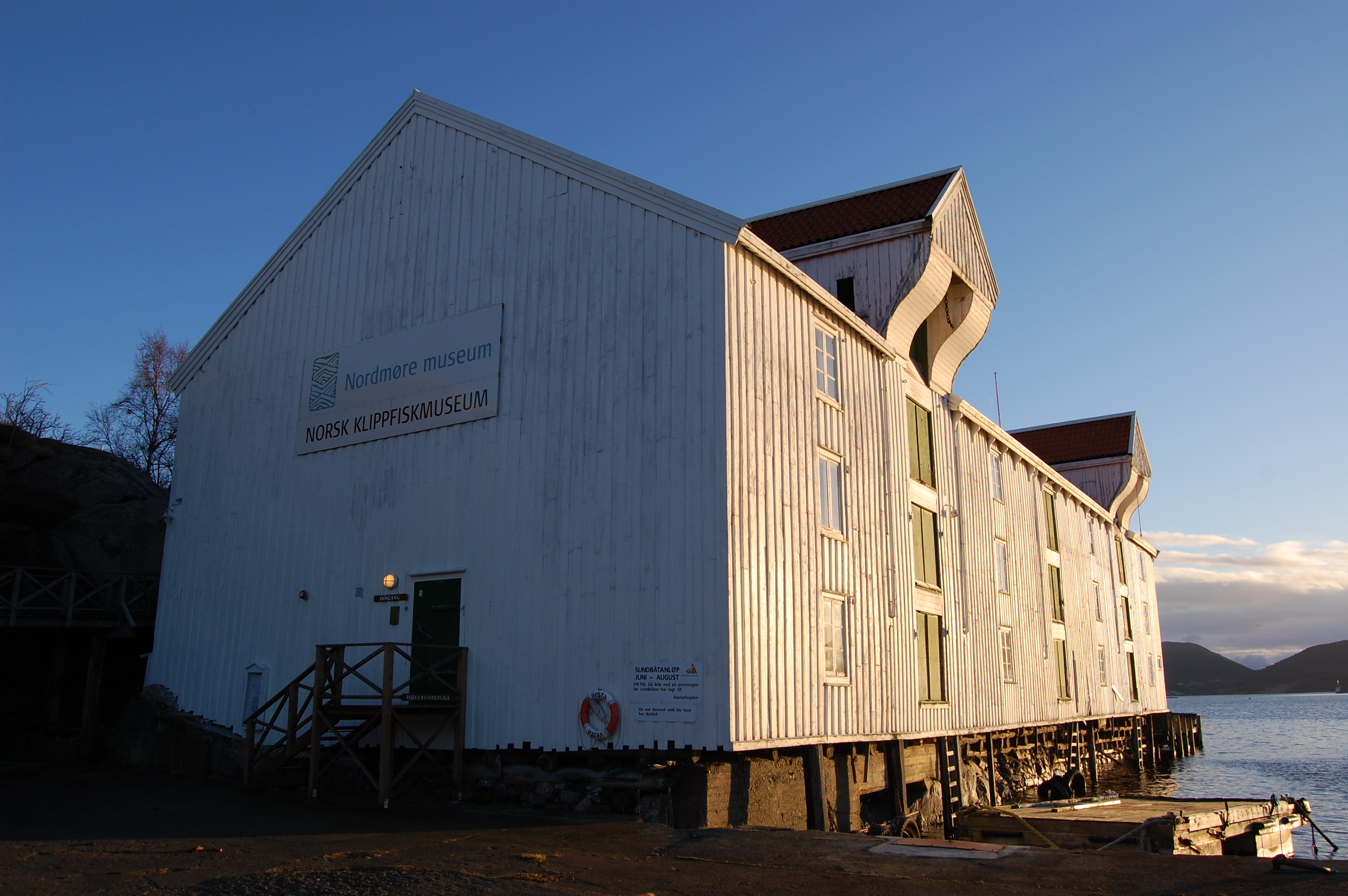
The Norwegian clipfish museum. These building are typical for Kristiansund, and are easy to see along the harbour.

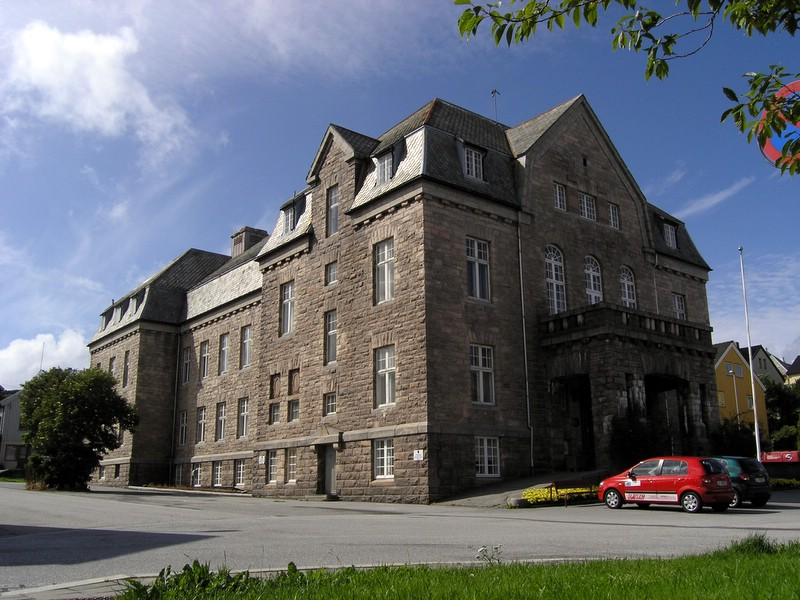
Festiviteten in Kristiansund

- The archipelago of Grip, northwest of Kristiansund is now part of Kristiasund municipality. Until 1964, it was Grip Municipality, the smallest municipality of Norway. Today it is a deserted fishing village, but is a popular tourist attraction for the special architecture and unique location. Norway's smallest stave church, which was constructed in the end of the 15th century is also located at Grip.
- Sundbåtene in Kristiansund claims to be the world's oldest public transport system, founded in 1876. The small "Sundbåt" passenger ferries crosses between the four "lands" of the city.
- The old city structure in Vågen is a center for the historical fishing settlement in Kristiansund. Mellemværftet is also located here, which is an old shipbuilding facility for sailing ships. The Norwegian Clipfish Museum is also located here.
- Innlandet is an old city part of Kristiansund with very special and unique coastal architecture. Innlandet is the part of Kristiansund that was least damaged during the bombings of Kristiansund during World War II .
- Nordic Light is an annual festival of photography arranged for the first time in 2006, and is currently the largest of its kind in Northern Europe. The festival is represented by Morten Krogvold.
- Festiviteten (Kristiansund Opera) is the oldest opera house in Norway. It is built in Art Nouveau-style, and was completed in 1914. It is one of the few older buildings in the city centre of Kristiansund that survived the bombing of the city during World War II .
- Tahitifestivalen is an annual music festival that is arranged in Kristiansund. The festival is arranged by Frode Alnæs and the cafè Dødeladen on Innlandet. The festival was first introduced for the first time in 2000. There has been artist like Dance with a Stranger, Madcon, Hellbillies, Madrugada, Bigbang and many more.
- Varden is an old lookout tower located 78 meters above sea level. At the top you get magnificent views to the shipping lane with the fishing village Grip on the horizon. The panorama goes 360 degrees with the Nordmøre mountains as a powerful backdrop. Open every day with free access where you can view the mountains and fjords of Nordmøre.

== Notable people ==
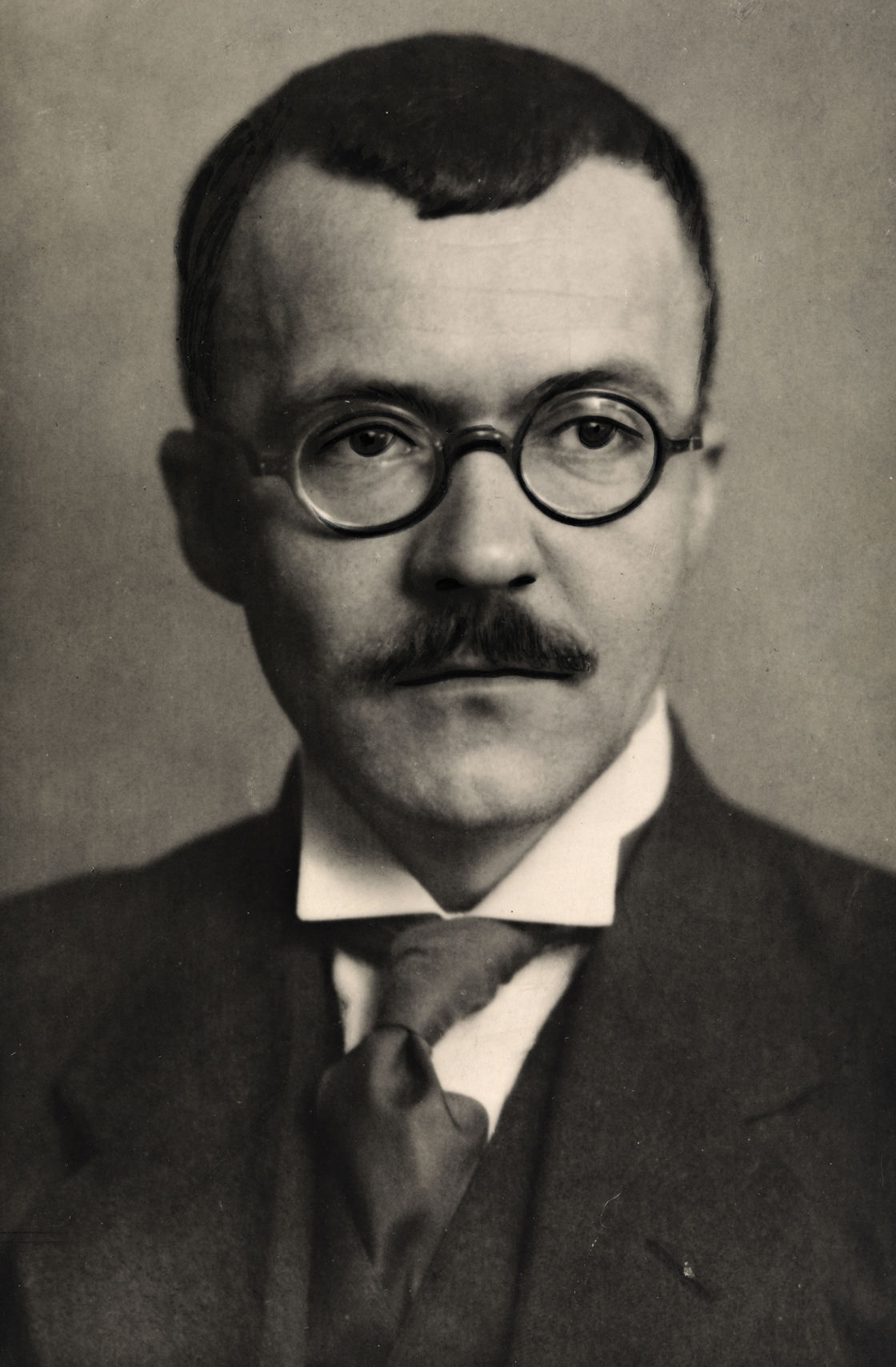
Arnulf Øverland

The following people are from, or have their roots in, Kristiansund.

=== The Arts ===
- Edvard Bræin (1887-1957), an organist, composer, and orchestra conductor
- Arnulf Øverland (1889–1968), a poet, wrote to inspire the Norwegian resistance movement
- Tordis Maurstad (1901–1997), a Norwegian stage actress
- Ragnar Vold (1906–1967), a journalist, non-fiction writer, and novelist
- Vera Zorina (1917–2003), a ballerina, theatre, and film actress who was brought up in Kristiansund
- Edvard Fliflet Bræin (1924–1976), a Norwegian composer and orchestra conductor
- Karsten Alnæs (born 1938), a fiction and popular history writer (parents were from Kristiansund)
- Ingar Knudtsen (born 1944), a fantasy & science fiction author who lives in Kristiansund
- Petter Schramm (1946-2014), a Norwegian poet who grew up in Kristiansund
- Øivind Elgenes (born 1958), a Norwegian vocalist, guitarist, and composer
- Frode Alnæs (born 1959), a singer and jazz guitarist who features with Dance with a Stranger
- Helge Tømmervåg (1961-2023), an electronic musician, stage name Mind over MIDI
- Dagfinn Koch (born 1964), a musician who writes chamber music and for orchestra, opera and ballet
- Jan Erik Mikalsen (born 1979), a Norwegian composer of contemporary classical music
- 120 Days (2001–2012), a rock band, formerly known as "The Beautiful People"

=== Public Service & business ===
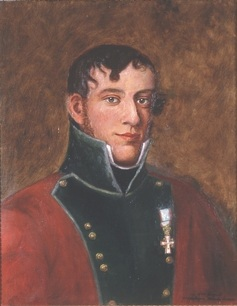
Georg Ulrich Wasmuth

- Wilhelm Frimann Koren Christie (1778–1849), a representative at the Norwegian Constituent Assembly
- John Moses (1781–1849), a merchant, politician, and representative at the Norwegian Constituent Assembly
- Georg Ulrich Wasmuth (1788–1814), a military officer and representative at the Norwegian Constitutional Assembly
- Peter Christian Knudtzon (1789-1864), a Danish businessman and ship-owner
- Nicolai Hanson (1870–1899), a Norwegian zoologist and Antarctic explorer
- Wollert Krohn-Hansen (1889—1973), a pastor and Bishop of Sør-Hålogaland from 1952-1959
- Kaare Fostervoll (1891–1981), the DG of Norwegian Broadcasting Corporation from 1949 to 1962
- Niels Werring (1897–1990), a Norwegian ship-owner of Wilh. Wilhelmsen Holding ASA
- Sigurd Frisvold (born 1947), an Army General and former Chief of Defence from 1999 to 2005

=== Sport ===
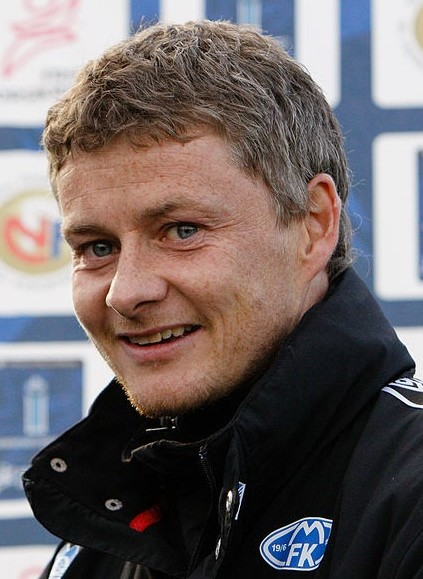
Ole Gunnar Solskjaer, 2011

- Ansgar Løvold (1888–1961), a wrestler, butcher, and philanthropist
- Arne Gaupset (1894–1976), a sport wrestler who competed at the 1924 Summer Olympics
- Robert Gaupset (1906–1964), a wrestler who competed at the 1928 Summer Olympics
- Ivar Stokke (1911–1993), a sport wrestler who competed in the 1936 Summer Olympics
- Babe Didrikson Zaharias (1914–1956), a U.S. golfer, athlete, and two-time Olympic gold medalist (her father Ole came from Kristiansund)
- Anders Giske (born 1959), a footballer with 288 club caps and 38 for Norway
- Gøran Sørloth (born 1962), a former footballer with 250 club caps and 55 for Norway
- Gudrun Høie (born 1970), an amateur sport wrestler and four-time world champion
- Anne Holten (born 1972), a Norwegian sport wrestler and twice world champion
- Øyvind Leonhardsen (born 1970), a footballer with 402 club caps and 86 for Norway
- Petter Rudi (born 1973), a retired footballer with 350 club caps and 46 for Norway
- Ole Gunnar Solskjær (born 1973), a footballer with 386 club caps and 67 for Norway
- Trond Andersen (born 1975), a former footballer with 334 club caps and 38 for Norway
- Jonny Hansen (born 1981), a footballer
- Aurora Mikalsen (born 1996), a footballer for Norway women's national football team
