= Endre Magnus Witzøe =

Norwegian ship broker and politician

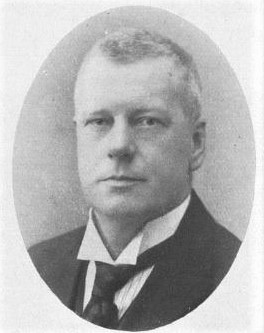
- Endre Witzøe
- Born: 24 April 1875; Kristiansund, Norway
- Died: 1 April 1934 (aged 58)
- Occupations: Ship broker Politician

Endre Magnus Witzøe (20 April 1875 – 1 April 1934) was a Norwegian ship broker and politician.

He was born in Kristiansund to farmer Endre Arntsen Witzøe and Eli Quikne. He was elected representative to the Storting for the period 1925–1927, 1928–1930 and 1931–1933, for the Conservative Party.
