= Tidens Krav =

Norwegian newspaper

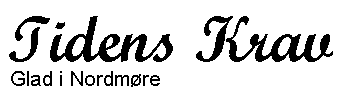
- Type: Daily newspaper
- Format: Tabloid
- Owner: AS Tidens Krav
- Founded: 1906
- Political alignment: Local
- Language: Norwegian
- Headquarters: Kristiansund (town), Norway
- Website: www.tk.no

Tidens Krav (English: The Time's Demands, abbreviated TK) is a local newspaper published in Kristiansund Municipality, Norway. It was founded in 1906, is published on paper twice a week (Tuesday and Thursday) and reports news from Nordmøre.

The newspaper owned the local television station TKTV (previously TV Nordvest), before it was discontinued in November 2018.

== Circulation ==
Circulation numbers verified by the Norwegian Media Businesses' Association:

- 2006: 15 150
- 2007: 15 412
- 2008: 15 281
- 2009: 14 900
- 2010: 14 605
