= Anton Ludvig Alvestad =

Norwegian politician (1883–1956)

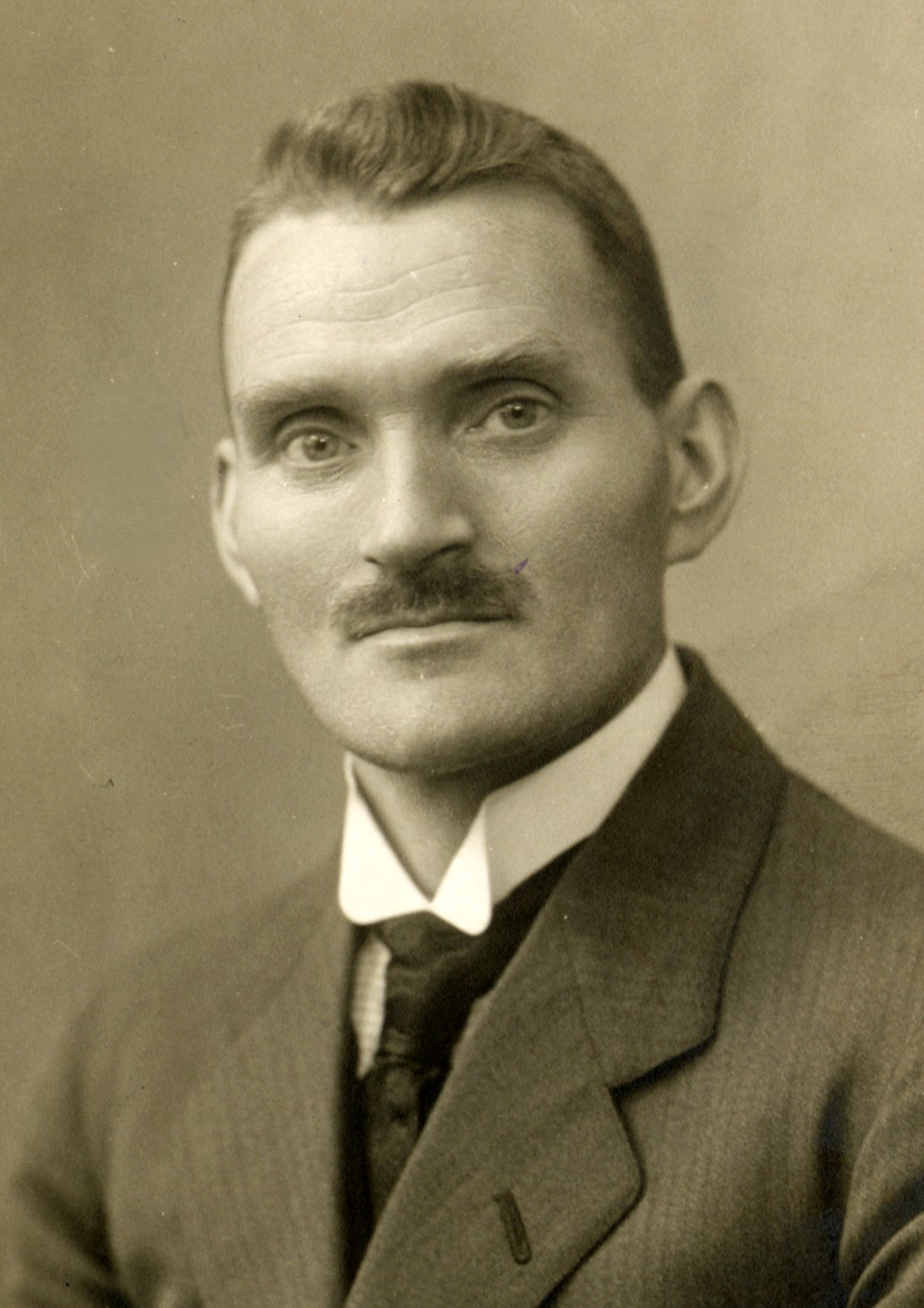

Minister of Trade
- In office 28 January 1928 – 15 February 1928
- Prime Minister: Christopher Hornsrud
- Preceded by: Charles Robertson
- Succeeded by: Lars Oftedal

Member of the Norwegian Parliament
- In office 1 January 1922 – 2 July 1956
- Constituency: Møre og Romsdal

Mayor of Ålesund
- In office 1 January 1920 – 31 December 1921
- Preceded by: Peter Elias Karolius Sæter
- Succeeded by: Tore Toresen Berset

Personal details
- Born: 7 May 1883 Sula, Romsdalen, Sweden-Norway
- Died: 2 July 1956 (aged 73)
- Party: Labour
- Spouse: Laura Olufine Larsen (m. 1908)

Anton Ludvig Alvestad (7 May 1883 – 2 July 1956) was a Norwegian politician and government minister for the Labour Party. Born in Sula, Alvestad was a baker by profession, and owned his own bakery. He was also active in the temperance movement. An active labour politician from an early date, he was among the founding members of the Labour Party of Ålesund. Between 1920 and 1921 he was the first Labour mayor of Ålesund Municipality.

Elected to the Norwegian Storting for the first time in 1921, he was re-elected repeatedly up until his death in 1956. In 1928 he served as Minister of Trade in the short-lived cabinet of Christopher Hornsrud. This, the first Labour government of Norway, lasted less than a month, from 28 January to 15 February.
