= Sunnylvsfjorden =

Fjord in Møre og Romsdal, Norway

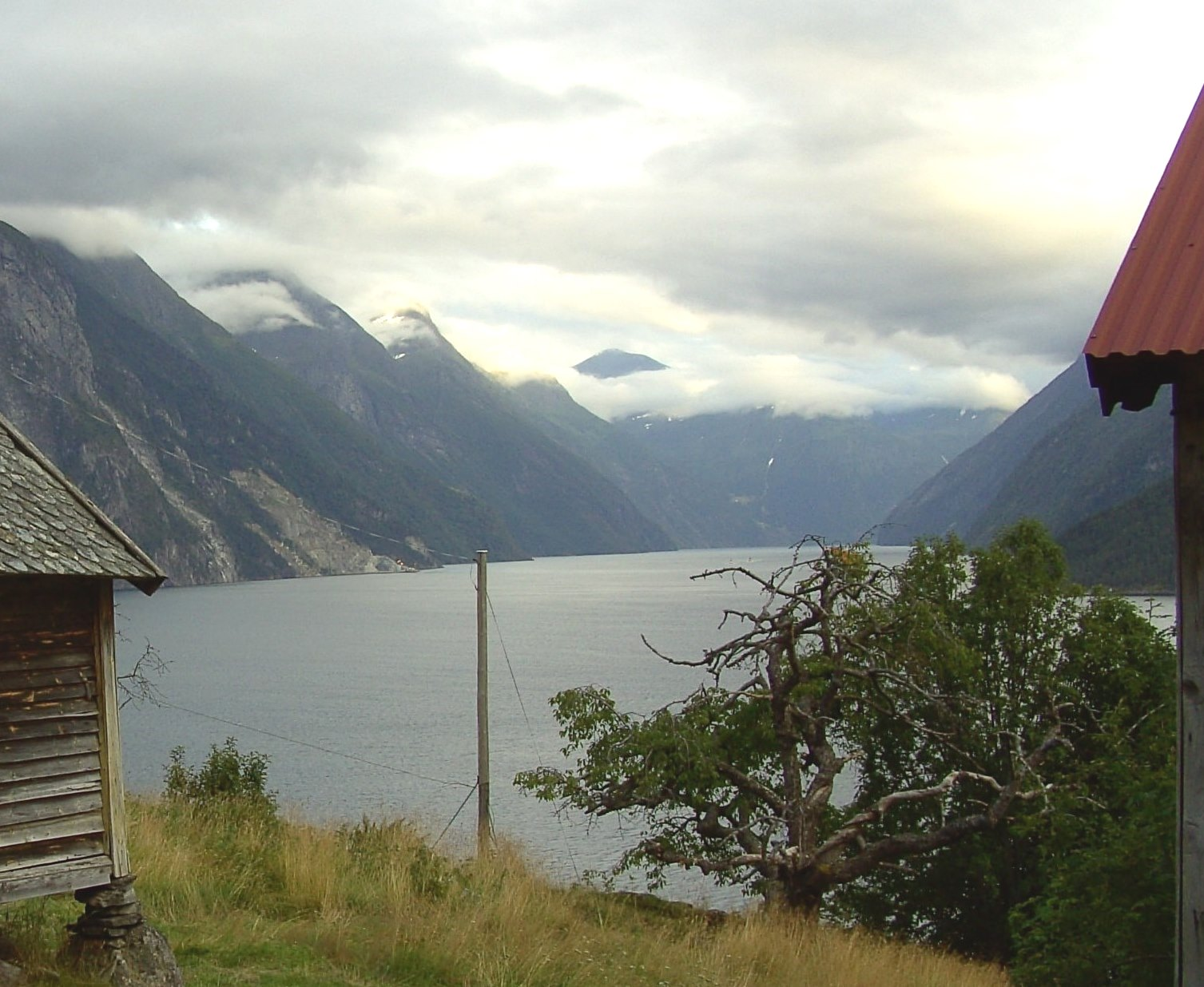
- View of the northern mouth of Sunnylvsfjorden seen across the Storfjorden at Liabygda village
- Interactive map of the fjord
- Location: Møre og Romsdal county, Norway
- Coordinates: 62.2242°N 7.0392°E
- Type: Fjord
- Primary inflows: Geirangerfjorden
- Primary outflows: Storfjorden
- Basin countries: Norway
- Max. length: 26 kilometres (16 mi)
- Max. width: 2 kilometres (1.2 mi)
- Settlements: Hellesylt

Sunnylvsfjorden is a fjord in Stranda Municipality and Fjord Municipality in Møre og Romsdal county, Norway. The 26-kilometre (16 mi) long Sunnylvsfjorden is one of the innermost branches of the large Storfjorden. The fjord ranges from 600 to 2,000 metres (2,000 to 6,600 ft) wide and reaches 452 metres (1,483 ft) below sea level at its deepest point, just west of Skrenakken near the mouth of the fjord. The famous Geirangerfjorden branches off to the west from the Sunnylvsfjorden.

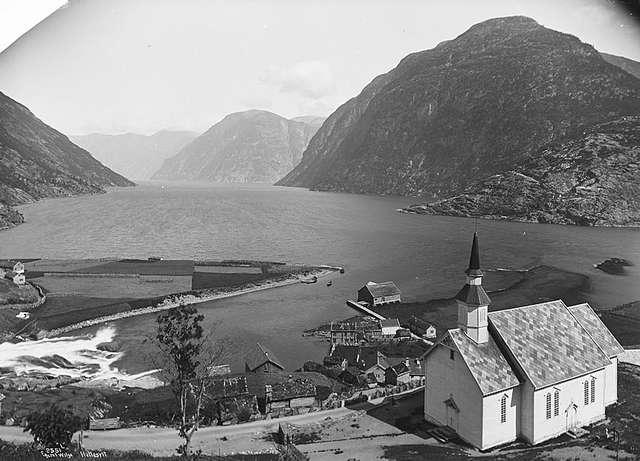
View of the fjord from Hellesylt, with Sunnylven Church Credit: Axel Lindahl

Just south of the village of Helsem, the Storfjorden splits off into the Norddalsfjorden (to the east) and Sunnylvsfjorden (to the south). The village of Hellesylt sits at the end of this fjord. The historic Me-Åkernes farm lies on a cliff on the north side of the fjord. The old Sunnylven Municipality was centered around this fjord.

== See also ==
- List of Norwegian fjords
