= Helsem =

Village in Stranda Municipality, Norway

- Village
- Interactive map of Helsem
- Location within Møre og Romsdal Location within Norway
- Coordinates: 62.2940°N 6.9548°E
- Country: Norway
- Region: Western Norway
- County: Møre og Romsdal
- District: Sunnmøre
- Municipality: Stranda Municipality

Area
  - Total: 0.39 km^{2} (0.15 sq mi)
- Elevation: 96 m (315 ft)

Population (2012)
  - Total: 257
  - Density: 659/km^{2} (1,710/sq mi)
- Time zone: UTC+01:00 (CET)
  - Summer (DST): UTC+02:00 (CEST)
- Post Code: 6200 Stranda

Helsem is a small village in Stranda Municipality in Møre og Romsdal county, Norway. The village is located just a couple kilometres south of the municipal centre of Stranda, along the Storfjorden, just north of where the Norddalsfjorden and Sunnylvsfjorden split off.

The 0.39-square-kilometre (96-acre) village had a population (2012) of 257 and a population density of 659 inhabitants per square kilometre (1,710/sq mi). Since 2012, the village has been considered part of the urban area of Stranda, so the population and area data for this village area is no longer separately tracked by Statistics Norway.
