= Sunnylven Church =

Church in Møre og Romsdal, Norway

- Sunnylven kyrkje
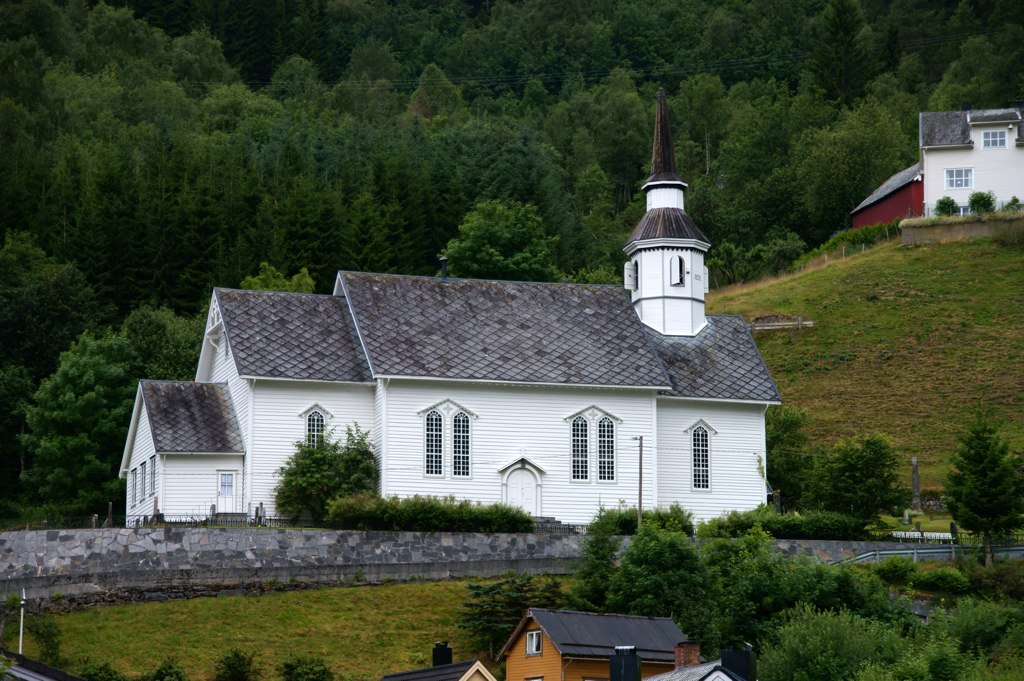
- View of the Sunnylven Church at Hellesylt; Credit: Miguel Angel Barroso Lorenzo
- Sunnylven Church
- 62°05′07″N 6°51′58″E
- Location: Stranda Municipality, Møre og Romsdal
- Country: Norway
- Denomination: Church of Norway
- Churchmanship: Evangelical Lutheran

History
- Status: Parish church
- Founded: 12th century
- Consecrated: 7 August 1859

Architecture
- Functional status: Active
- Architect(s): Ludolph Rolfsen; Hans Linstow
- Architectural type: Long church
- Completed: 1859 (167 years ago)

Specifications
- Capacity: 400
- Materials: Wood

Administration
- Diocese: Møre bispedømme
- Deanery: Nordre Sunnmøre prosti
- Parish: Sunnylven
- Norwegian Cultural Heritage Site
- Type: Church
- Status: Listed
- ID: 85003

Sunnylven Church (Norwegian: Sunnylven kyrkje) is a parish church of the Church of Norway in Stranda Municipality in Møre og Romsdal county, Norway. It is located in the village of Hellesylt, at the end of the Sunnylvsfjorden. It is the church for the Sunnylven parish which is part of the Nordre Sunnmøre prosti (deanery) in the Diocese of Møre. The white, wooden church was built in a long church style in 1859 by the builder Ludolph Rolfsen who used plans by the architect Hans Linstow. The church seats about 400 people.

== History ==
The earliest existing historical records of the church date back to 1432 where it was mentioned in Aslak Bolt's cadastre, but there has been a church here in the Hellesylt area dating back to at least the year 1150. The first Sunnylven Church was likely a wooden stave church that was probably built in the 12th century. This church was located on the Korsbrekke farm, about 1 kilometre (0.62 mi) southeast of the present site of the church in the village of Hellesylt. During the 15th or 16th centuries, the old stave church was expanded into a cruciform design by adding timber-framed transepts to the north and south sides of the nave. At some point, the old choir for the stave church was torn down and replaced with a timber-framed choir.

On 15 March 1727, a large avalanche came down the nearby mountain and destroyed the old church. At that time, they chose to replace the church with a new building, but it was also decided to build it in a new location. The new church would be built on the southwest side of the village of Hellesylt, on a hill overlooking the village. This new church was consecrated in 1730. The new building was a timber-framed cruciform design.

The 1730 cruciform church was in use until Pentecost Sunday 1858, when it was closed and torn down shortly after. Once the site was cleared, work began on a new long church building on the same site. Work progressed over the summer and fall of 1858, and it was consecrated the following year on 7 August 1859. Captain Ludolph Rolfsen from the nearby Stryn Municipality designed the church based on drawings by Hans Linstow. Rolfsen also headed the construction of Hornindal Church and Nedstryn Church, both in the Nordfjord region to the south of here, and these churches share many features. Shipbuilder Nils A. Liaaen of Sunnylven Municipality designed Sylte Church in 1862 and was probably inspired by this church at Hellesylt.

Playwright Henrik Ibsen visited Hellesylt in the summer of 1862 when this church was new and Sunnylven with Geiranger had just been named a separate prestegjeld (parish). Sunnylven Municipality and the local priest, Rev. Ole Olsen Barman (born 1816), was an inspiration for Ibsen's dramatic poem Brand.

== Media gallery ==
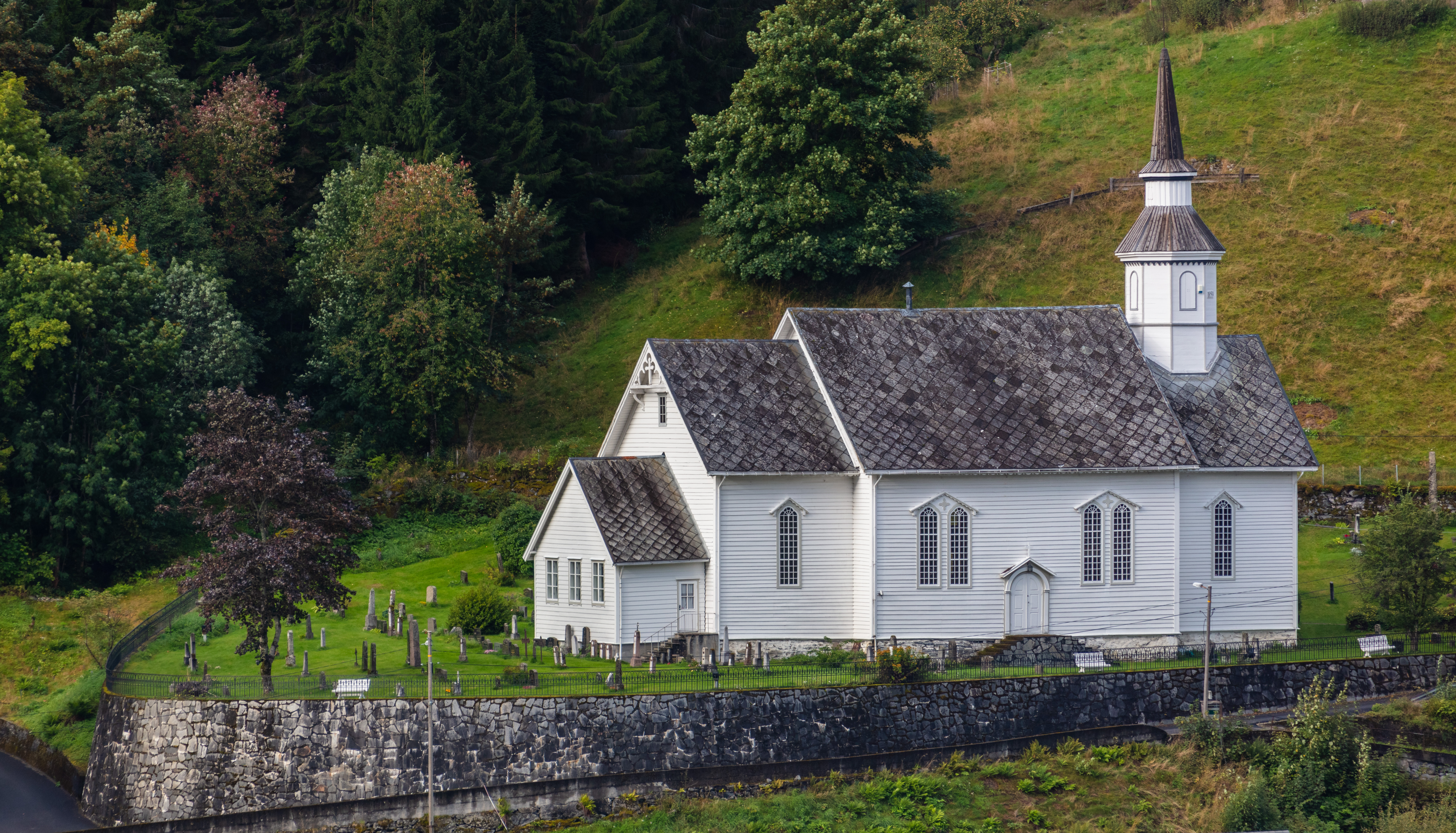

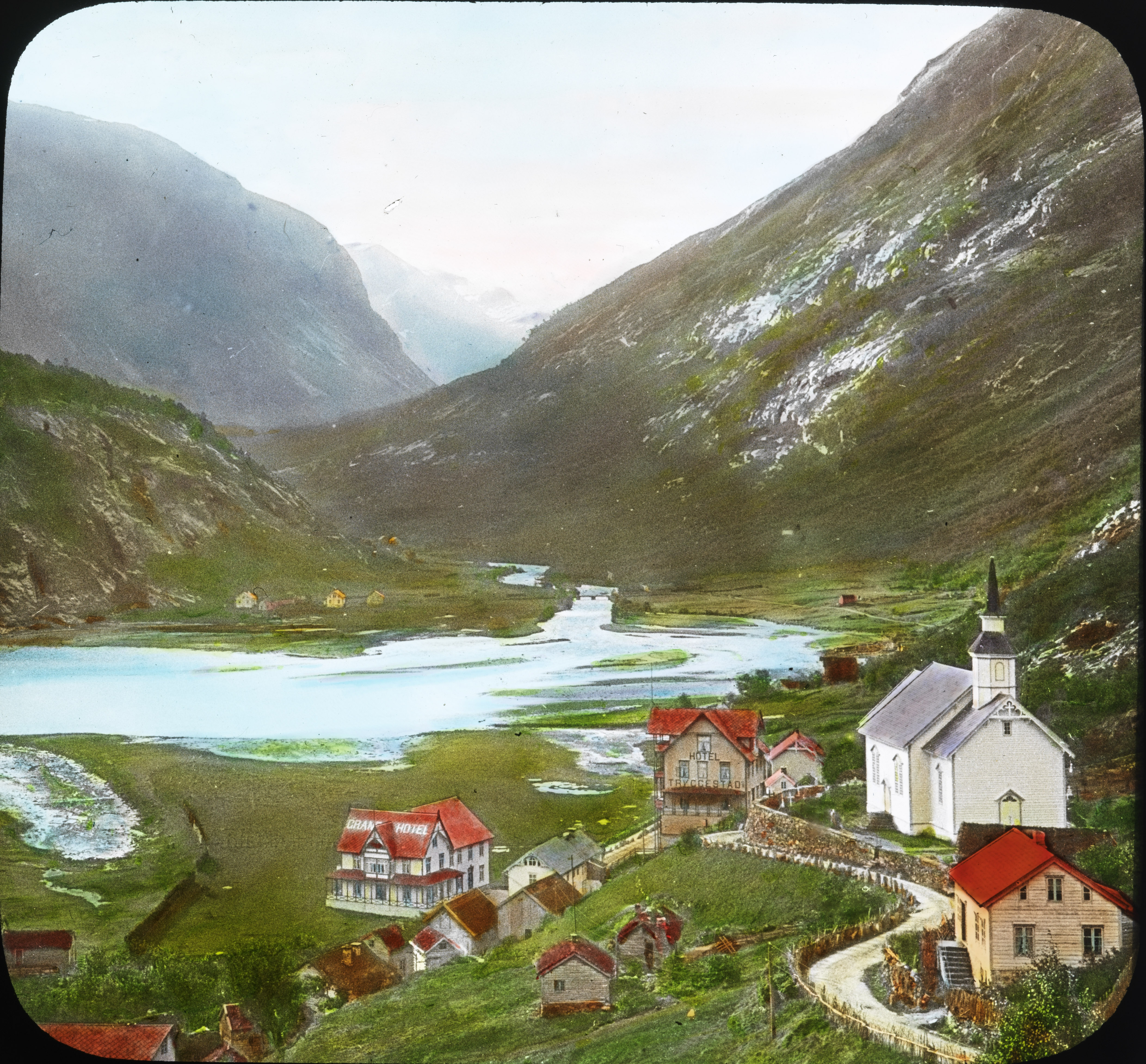
Colored photo, circa 1900.

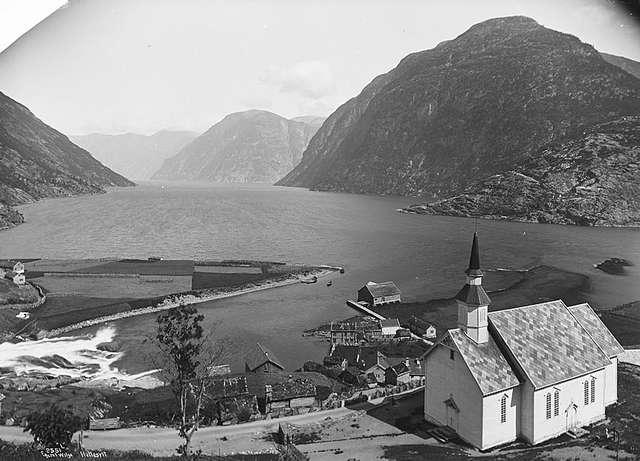
Hellesylt with church late 1800s, Sunnylvsfjorden in the background.
Credit: Axel Lindahl

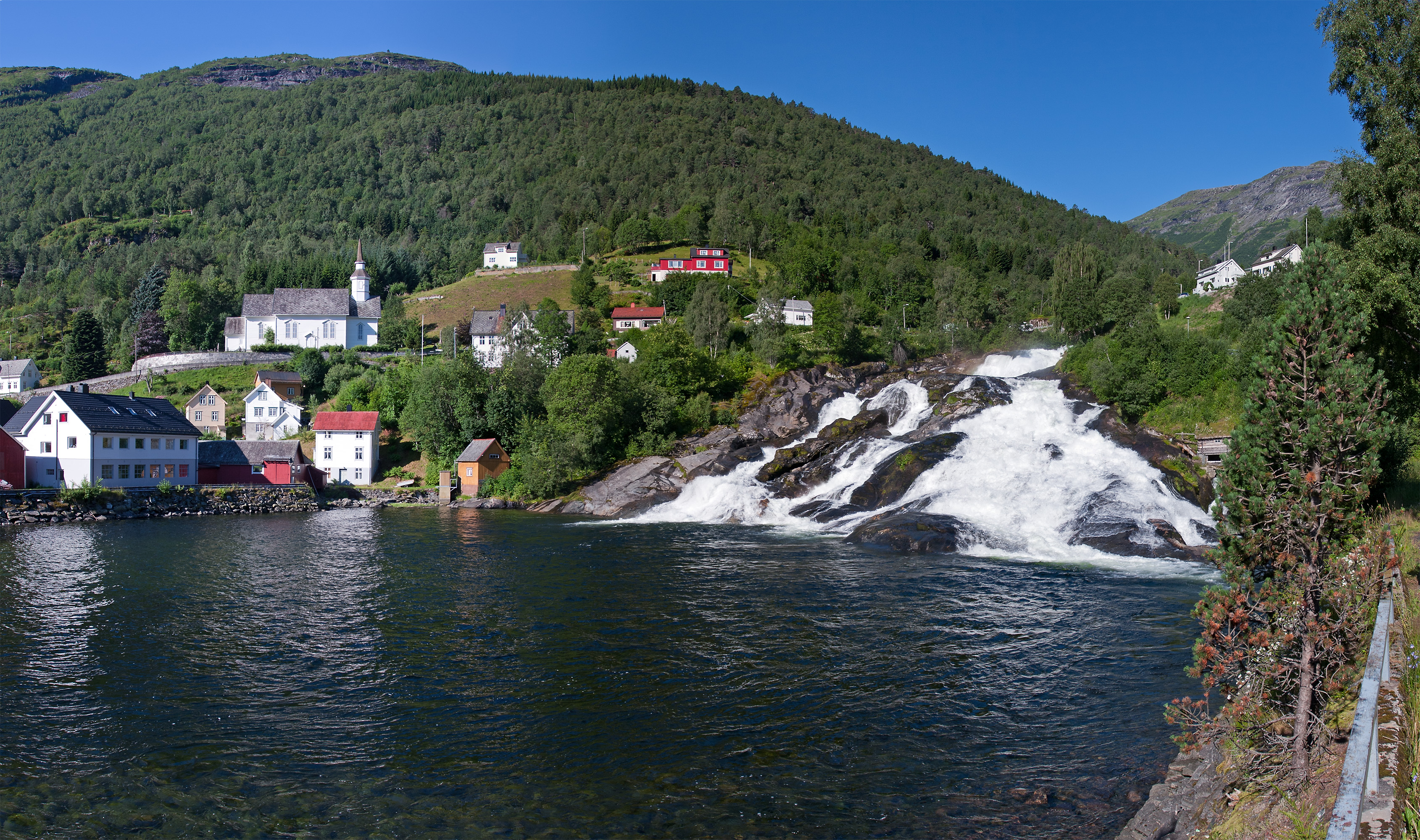

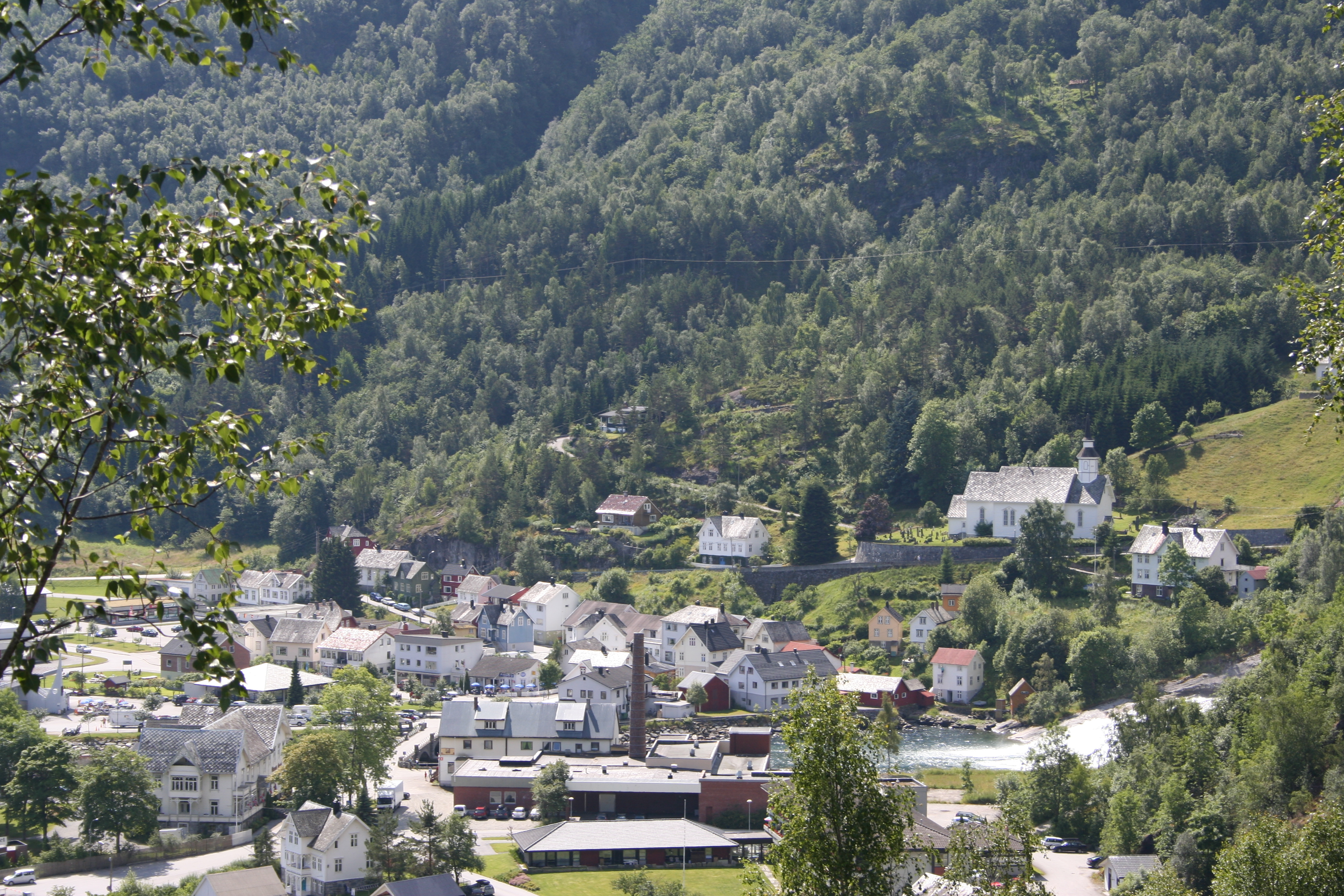

== See also ==
- List of churches in Møre
