= Deserted farm =

In Nordic countries, farms no longer in use

A deserted farm (Norwegian: ødegård, Icelandic: eyðibýli, Swedish: ödegård) in Norway, and other Nordic countries, is a farm that was left abandoned or unused for various reasons.

== Terminology ==
In Norway, this term applies primarily to farms deserted due to the Black Death in 1349 and 1350. In many cases, the description of the farm as øde ('deserted') became part of the farm name for posterity when the farms came back into use again. Examples of such names include Øderå and Kroksundøgarden (both in Hole Municipality), Øde-Rud (in Nannestad Municipality), Hole-Ødegården (in Ringerike Municipality), Øde-Hval (in both Ringerike Municipality and Modum Municipality), and simply Ødegården (e.g. in Fredrikstad Municipality). A contracted variant of the name is Øygard (in Grimstad Municipality) or Øygarden (in Kristiansand Municipality).

The term ødegård is also used in Denmark, where, starting in the 1950s, Copenhagen residents began looking for abandoned and deserted small farms in Sweden that they could buy or rent and use for the summer.

== History ==
After the plague epidemics of the 1300s, the population of Norway fell by up to 64%. Because of the reduced population, people abandoned the lowest-quality and most isolated farms, working the better and more central farms instead. In the 1500s the population started growing again, and over the course of 150 years the population tripled in size. In order to support and house the continually increasing number of people, the deserted farms started being used again. There were conflicts over the ownership of the deserted farms, with questions about who actually owned them after they had sat abandoned for 200 years. Landowners claimed deserted farms in their area as their own. Land that had no owner was assigned to the crown. Those that cleared the old deserted farms therefore rented the land. There was an abundance of land until the end of the 1600s. Then competition for resources began again, creating the basis for a new underclass of crofters.

== Taxation ==
Deserted farms in Norway were exempt from taxes for a transitional period after farming operations were resumed. After that, the farm enjoyed a special low tax rate.

== See also ==
- Me-Åkernes
