= Alperittet =

Sports competition in Norway

Alperittet is a competition in the sport telemark skiing (mountain telemark) that is held each year at the end of February. The race is arranged in Stranda Municipality in Møre og Romsdal county, Norway. It was first held in 1995 and has been held each year since, with the exception of 2002, when it was cancelled out of respect for a competitors who died on the day before the race. The race is a non-profit event where everybody works for free in order to organize it. In 2004, Alperittet became a part of the Norwegian telemark cup, and hosted the Norwegian championship for mountain telemark in 2006.

The race course is 6,200 metres (3.9 mi) long (the same number as Stranda's postal code), starts at an elevation of 1,230 metres (4,040 ft) above sea level on the mountain Roalden, and winds its way through canyons and a forest, over farm fields and through town streets, before finishing by the seaside in the village centre of Stranda in front of the municipal hall.

However, Alperittet is not only a competition for those fond of skiing; it is also a mountain bike competition (cross-country) that happens every year in mid-September. The competition gathers around 100 riders. The first race was in 2002 when only a few local riders entered, but the popularity has increased rapidly since. The name Alperittet was taken from the winter competition but is suitable for the summer competition as well. The 42-kilometre (26 mi) long track starts at the municipal hall of Stranda, goes up in the mountains and through the “alps”, further down to the sea and back to the finish line at the city hall.
