= Anders Beer Wilse =

Norwegian photographer (1865–1949)

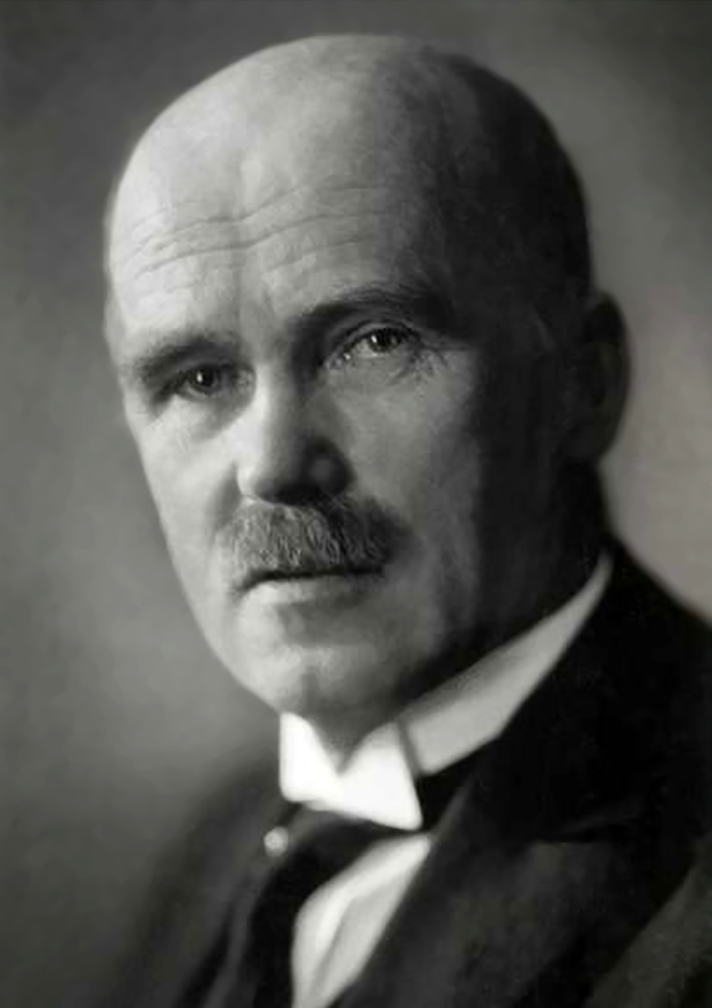
- Anders Beer Wilse ca. 1935
- Born: 12 June 1865; Flekkefjord, Norway
- Died: 21 February 1949 (aged 83); Oslo, Norway

Anders Beer Wilse (12 June 1865 – 21 February 1949) was a Norwegian photographer who documented Norway in the early to mid-20th century and also worked in the United States.

Wilse was born in Flekkefjord, but grew up in Kragerø and decided early to become a sailor. After having graduated with a technical degree from the technical school in Horten in 1882, Wilse emigrated to the United States in 1884. He did not find work in the beginning, but eventually settled in Seattle working for the United States Geological Survey. He is reported to have acquired his first camera in 1886. He opened a photography store in Seattle in 1897, after having visited Norway, and married Helen Marie Hutchinson.

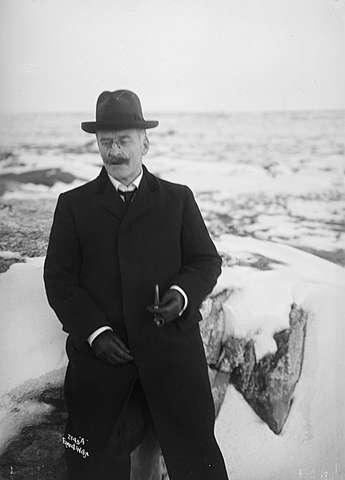
Wilse's photograph of Knut Hamsun in 1914

In 1900, his wife and children moved to Norway, and Wilse himself joined them, opening a photography store in Christiania in 1901, after 17 years in the United States.

== Work ==
Wilse traveled extensively in Norway, both on assignment and for his own interest. He brought his 10 kg camera to inaccessible places through rugged terrain, going as far north as Svalbard.

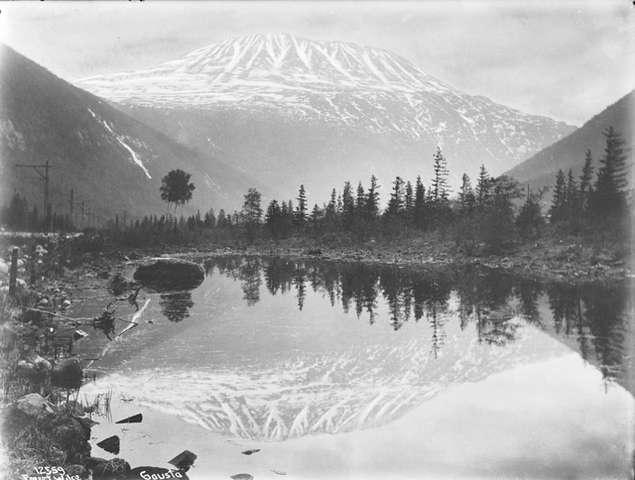
"Gausta" (Gaustatoppen)

He photographed both natural sceneries and people at work, including the fishing industry in Lofoten before the introduction of motorized boats. His photography business was also a commercial success, and he acquired among other things the entire archive of Axel Lindahl, who had photographed scenes in Norway in the 1880s and 1890s. His photos also appeared in National Geographic Magazine.

== Family ==
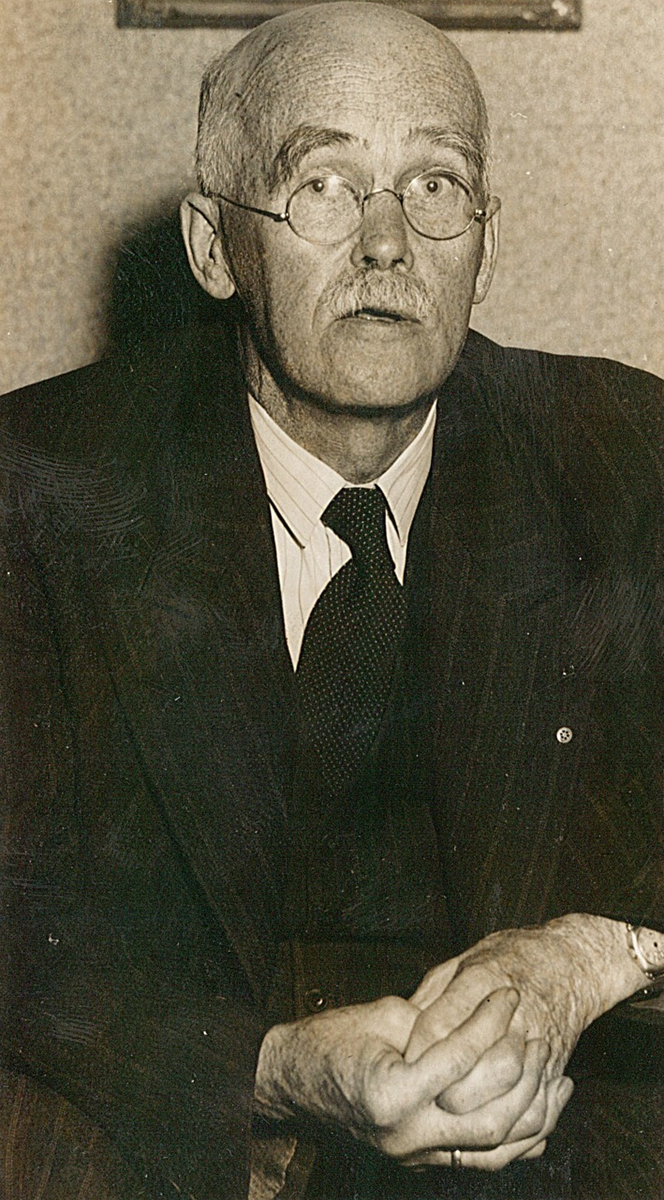
Anders Beer Wilse ca. 1940

Wilse's son Robert Charles Wilse (10 December 1897 - 11 September 1969) was also a photographer.

== Work ==
Wilse left behind about 200,000 images. Most of his negatives are now preserved at museums, including Norsk Folkemuseum, where more than 100,000 sceneries and ethnological images are held, Oslo Bymuseum for images related to the history of Oslo, the National Library of Norway for portrait photography, and the Norwegian Maritime Museum for maritime photographs.

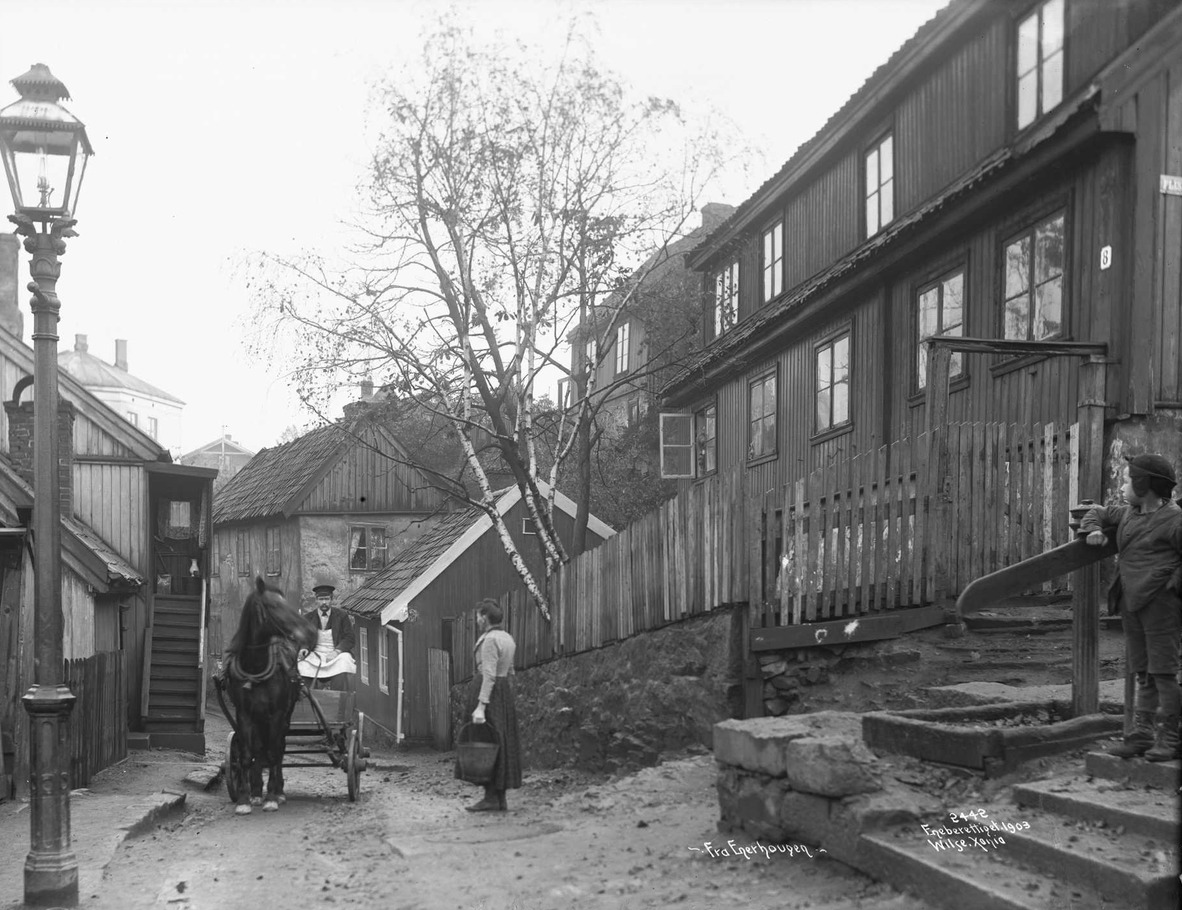
Scene in Enerhauggata section of Oslo

A collection of his negatives also kept in the Chusseau-Flaviens collection at George Eastman House. These images are being scanned digitally, and many are available online. In 2014 Wilse's photos were included in "Norges dokumentarv" - the most important documentary heritage of Norway. Dagens Næringsliv describes Wilse as Norway's most prominent photographer. He left behind a cultural heritage, the newspaper writes.

== Gallery ==
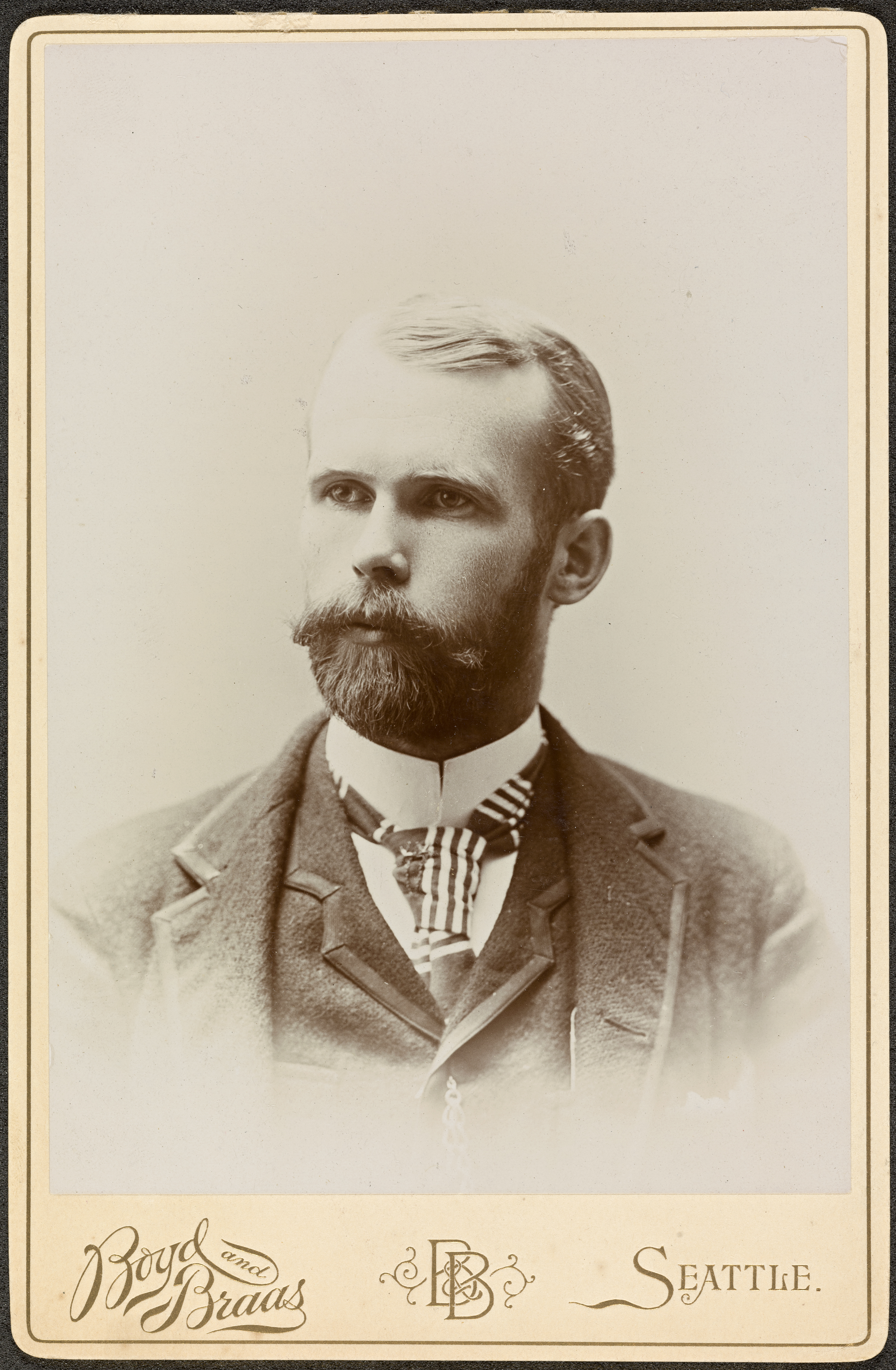
Wilse, 1892

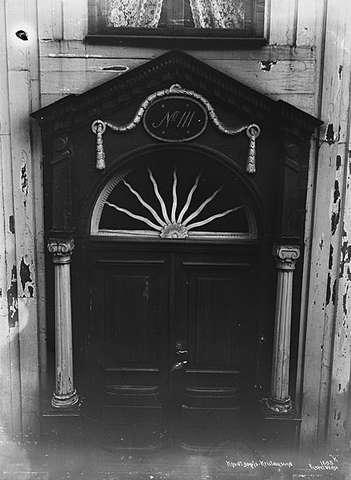
Knudtzongården, Kristiansund

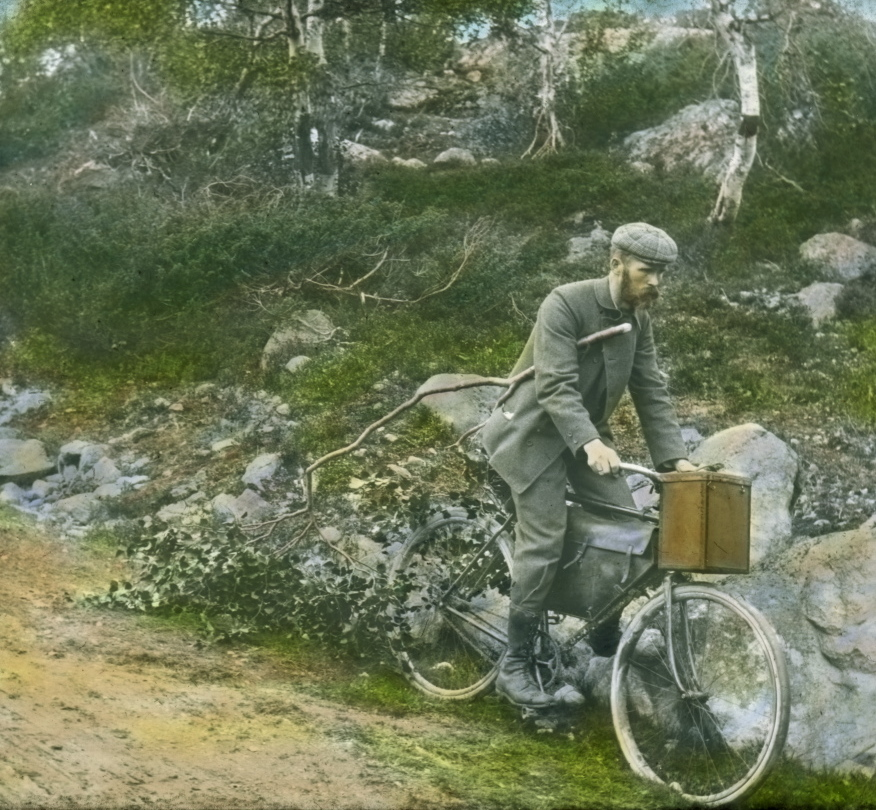

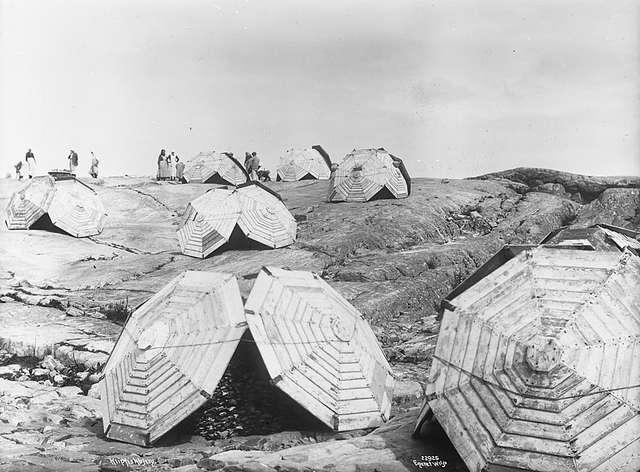

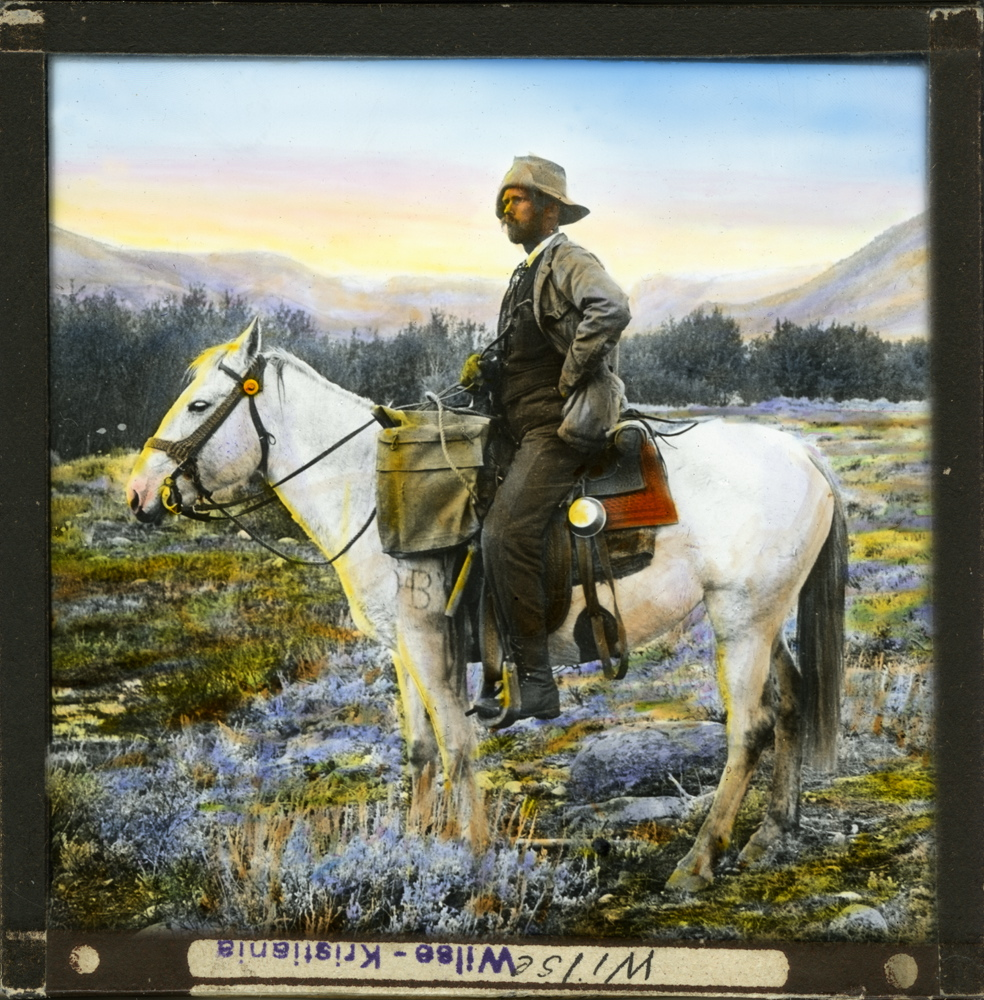

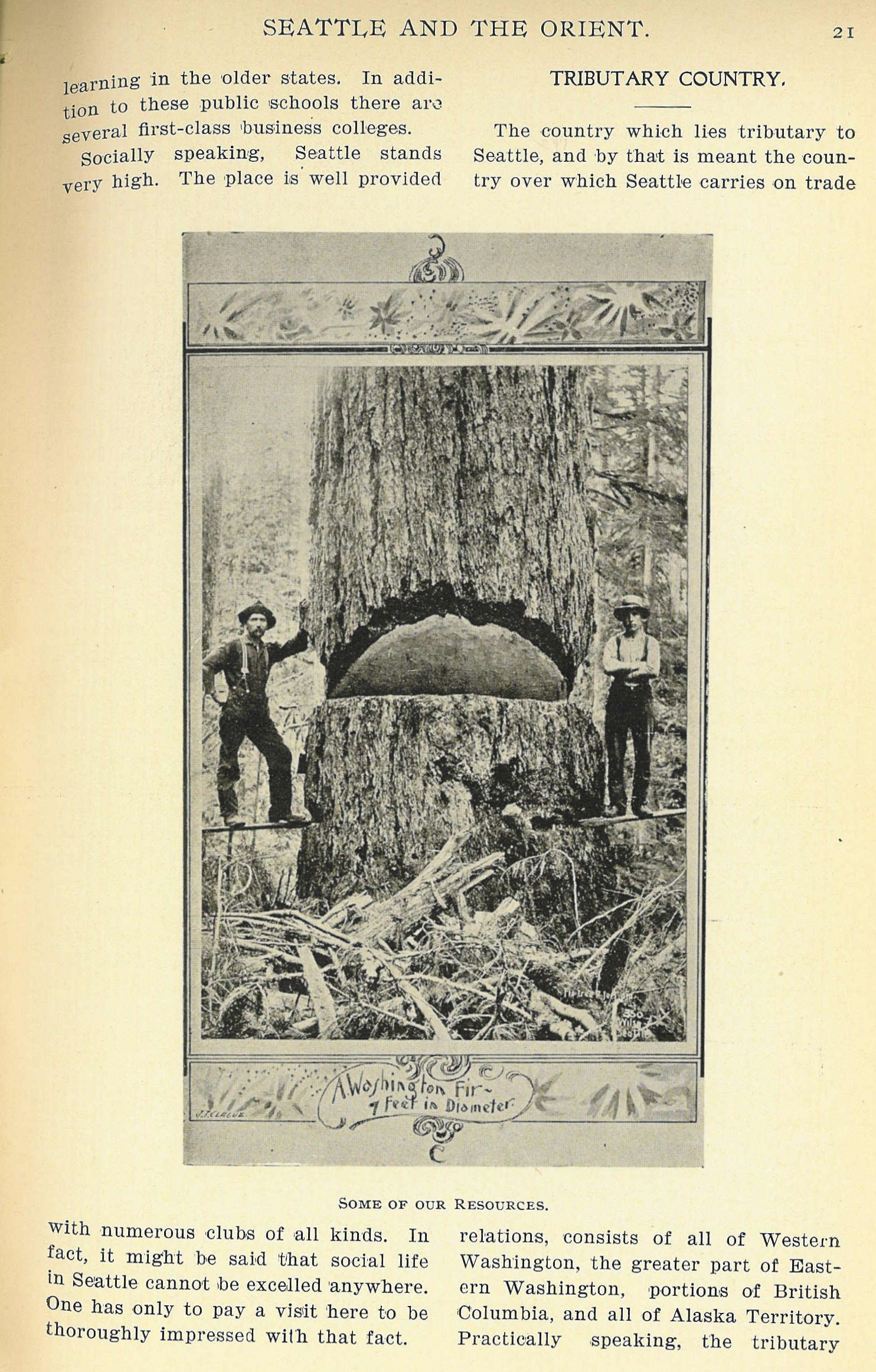
A. Wilse photo from Seattle and the Orient brochure
