= Me-Åkernes =

Historic mountain farm in Stranda Municipality, Norway

- Historic farm
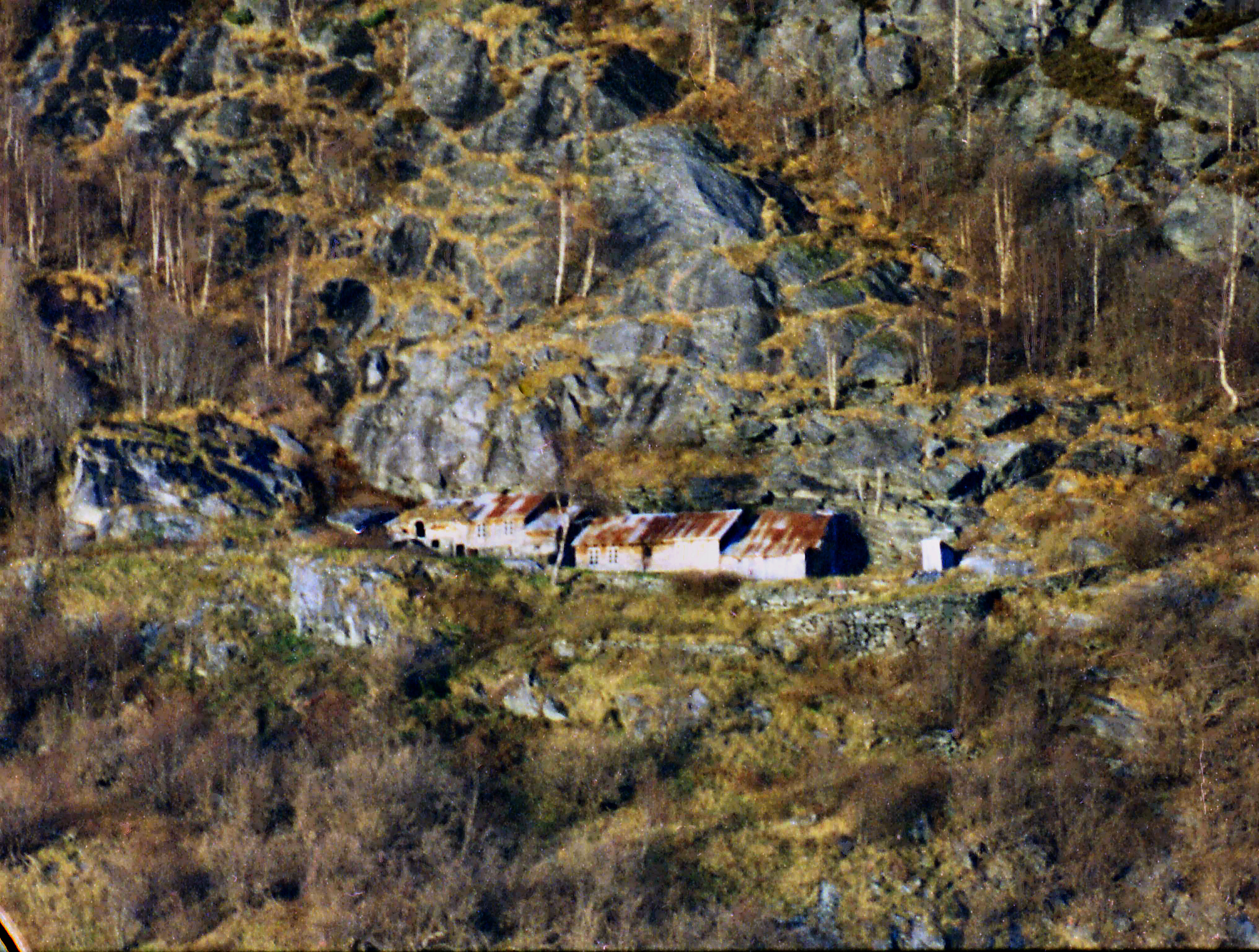
- View of the farm, seen from Oaldsbygda; Credit: Frode Inge Helland
- Interactive map of Me-Åkernes
- Location within Møre og Romsdal Location within Norway
- Coordinates: 62.17371°N 7.00165°E
- Country: Norway
- Region: Western Norway
- County: Møre og Romsdal
- District: Sunnmøre
- Municipality: Stranda Municipality
- Elevation: 86 m (282 ft)
- Time zone: UTC+01:00 (CET)
  - Summer (DST): UTC+02:00 (CEST)
- Post Code: 6216 Geiranger

Me-Åkernes (historically: Midtre Åkernes) is a deserted fjord farm in Stranda Municipality in Møre og Romsdal county, Norway. The farm is located on the slopes of Åkerneset mountain along the northern shore of the Sunnylvsfjorden (an inner branch fjord of the Storfjorden). It is situated 13 kilometres (8 mi) northeast of the village of Hellesylt.

The farm is located in the West Norwegian Fjords, a Norwegian World Heritage Site. It has been preserved both due to being located on a unique geologic site and as a representative of typical Norwegian farm culture in the fjord regions.

This geologically unique farm has also been identified as the model for the farm place appearing in Henrik Ibsen’s play Brand based on the similarity in the description and his visit there on 16 July 1862:

And here it stands without a fear
Because the glacier passes here
Just when the time of leave sprouts comes
Above the heads like boulder storms
The parsonage protected stands, like in a cascade cave.

== Name ==
The Åkernes farm is first mentioned in 1603 ("Ackernes"), but it is probably from the Middle Ages. The Norse form must have been Akrnes, a compound of akr which means "field" or "acre" and nes which means "headland". The farm was later divided into three parts: indre ('innermost'), ytre ('outermost') and midtre ('middle'). The form me is a local dialect form of midtre, therefore the farm Me-Åkernes means 'the middle one of the Åkernes farms'.

== Location and access ==
The farm is on a ledge about 100 metres (330 ft) above sea level on a steep avalanche-threatened hillside. Thus the five farm buildings are built against the rock face of a protected overhanging cliff face in the hillside, and the roofs are level with the slope, such that avalanches pass over the buildings without harming them. The only access is from the Storfjorden waters below; access from the ridge above is extremely difficult.

There is no natural harbour on the shore, just a small man-made landing place and some remaining stone walls that are remnants of an earlier boat shed. The boats were dragged onto dry land for safekeeping from the seas from the fjord.

== Buildings and operation ==
The main house is where it is least exposed to avalanches. The hay barn and cowshed are added onto opposite ends of the house, for a total length of 35 metres (115 ft). The Me-Åkernes farm is, except for the unusual adaptation to the terrain and accommodation for danger from avalanches, a typical multi-activity farm representative of the fjord and mountain farms of the Sunnmøre district. The farms had to base their economy on agriculture, fishing and hunting.

Me-Åkernes was originally a single farm, but in 1881 its fields were divided in halves between two related couples. The house and farm buildings were shared in common, but each couple maintained their own livestock. There could be as many as 12–14 people living simultaneously at the farm. Each family would support livestock of four cattle and 40 sheep by supplementing fodder in the winter season by use of seaweed. The seaweed was treated in warm water, minced, and barley flour added. Although more recently they grew potatoes and barley, a field area named "Rugåkeren" (the Rye Field) indicates that rye was grown there in earlier times. To thresh the grain they used a manual threshing machine.

Today, the farm is private property, but the preservation society "Storfjordens venner" (lit. 'The Friends of The Great Fjord') have maintained the buildings. The last residents farming the land were Anders and Solveig Hanson Ringdal. They moved away from the farm on 6 December 1958.

== Risk of landslide ==
Today the farm is, due to its location by the Åkernesrenna (the Åkernes crevice), at considerable risk. The Åkernesrenna has in recent years widened at an accelerating rate, and analyses show the threat of a coming landslide, estimated at 50 million cubic metres (65 million cubic yards with latest estimates of up to 100 million cubic metres or 130 million cubic yards). The landslide will go directly into the fjord, causing a flood wave (landslide induced megatsunami) of about 30 metres (100 ft) in height, which will sweep the fjord and devastate the areas adjacent to Sunnylvsfjorden and Storfjorden.

== Pictures ==
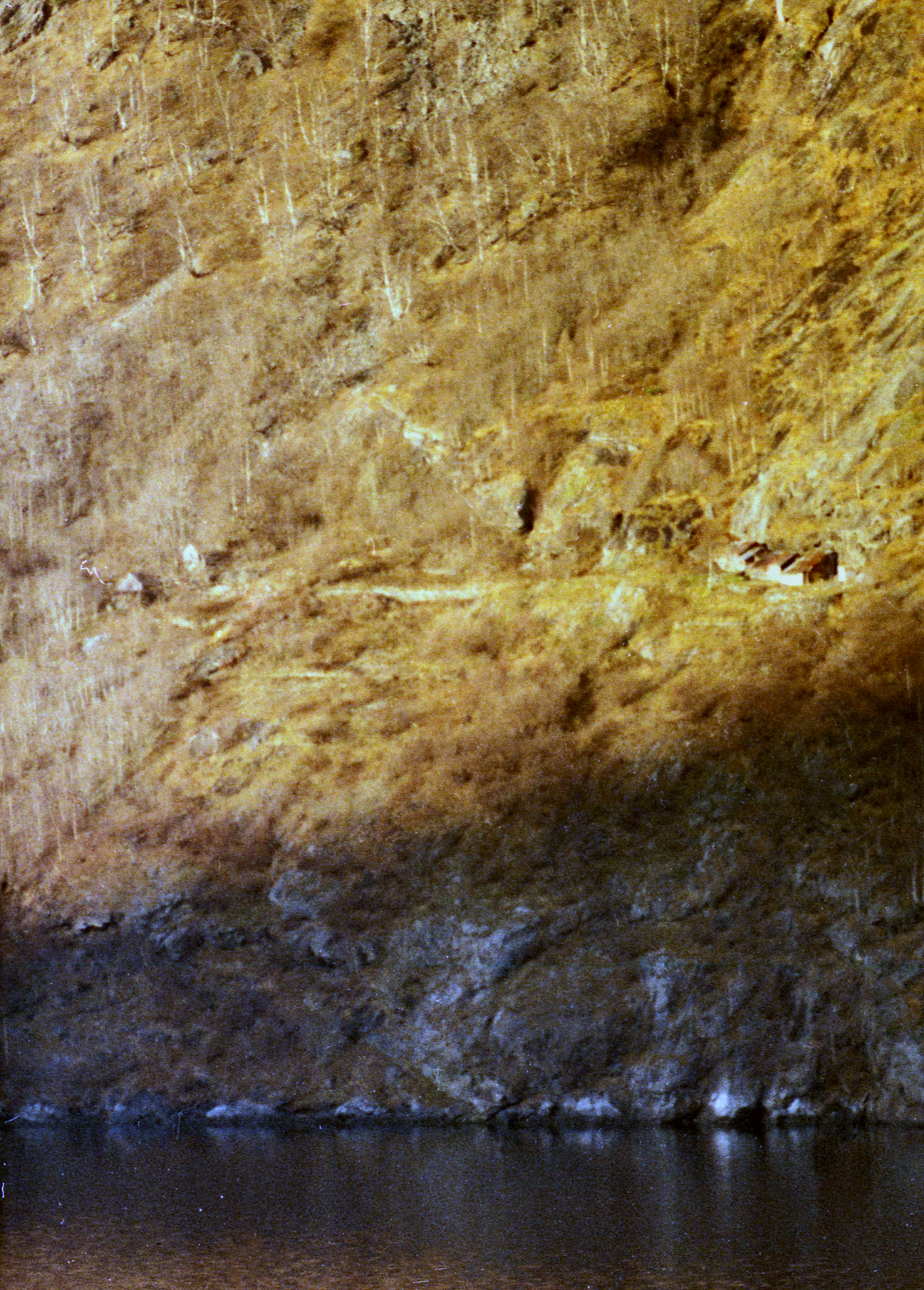
Me-åkerneset seen from Oaldsbygda, a settlement across the Sunnylvsfjorden.

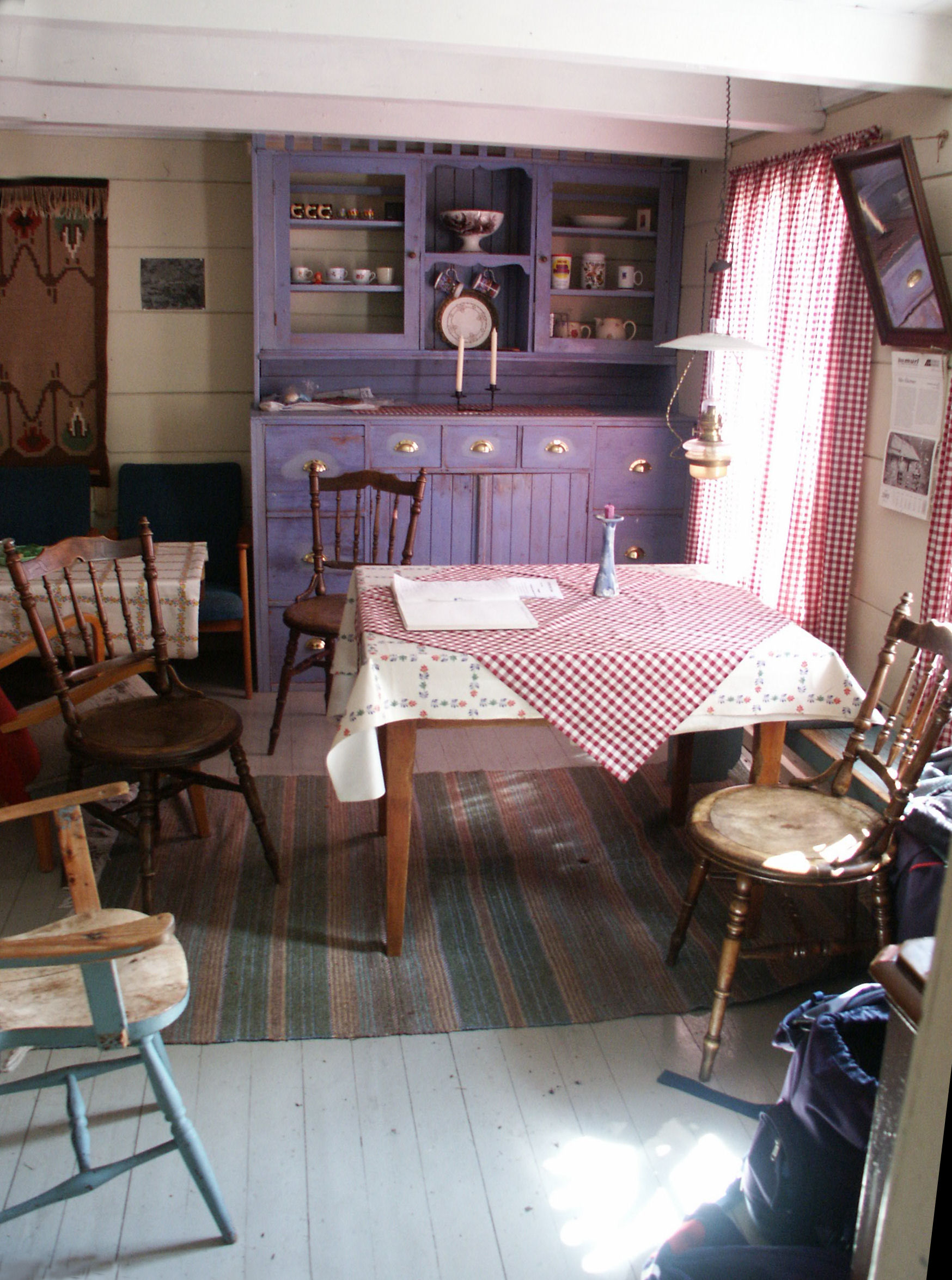
Kitchen interior, preserved as it was when vacated in 1958.

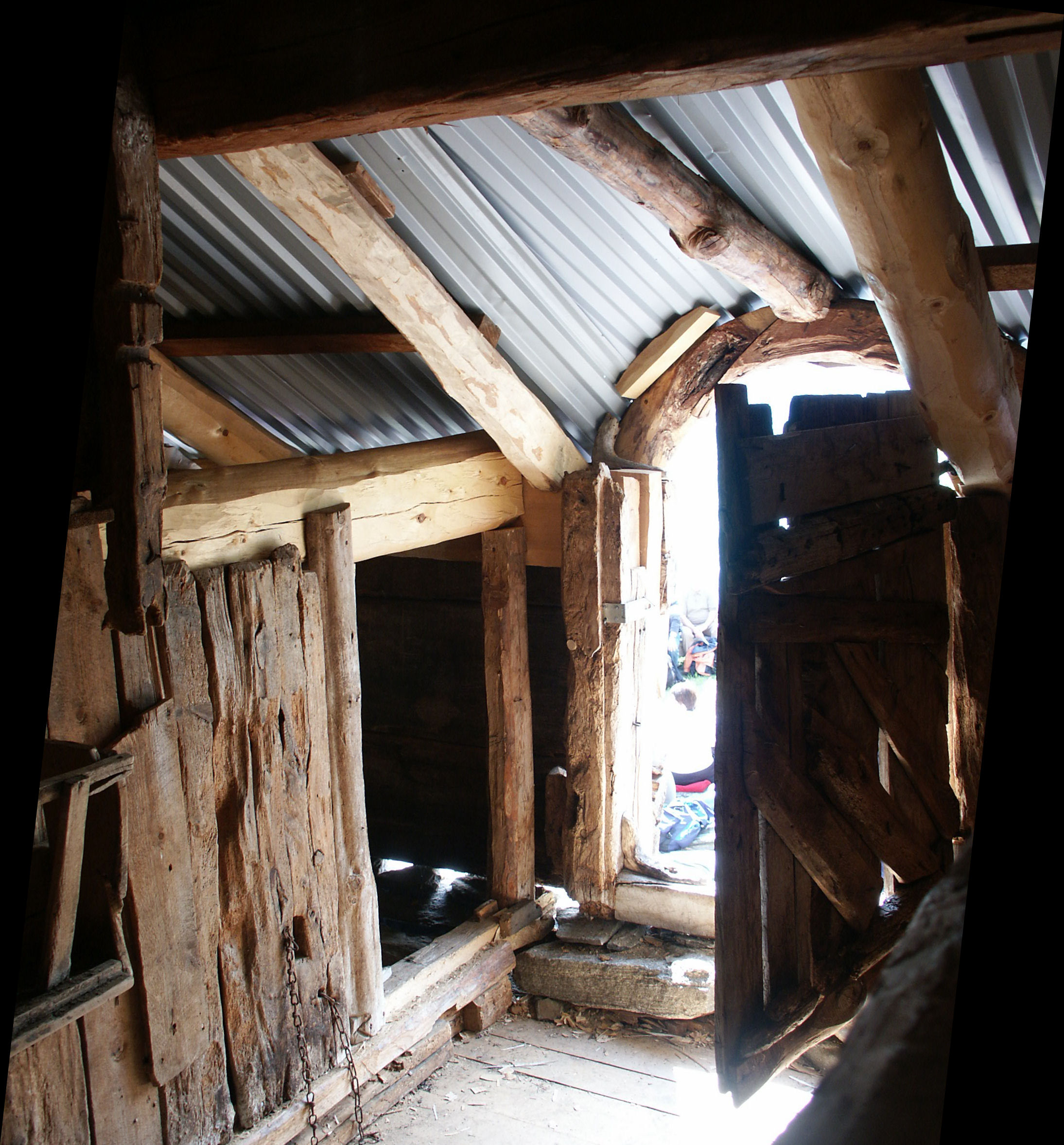
Passage to the barn.

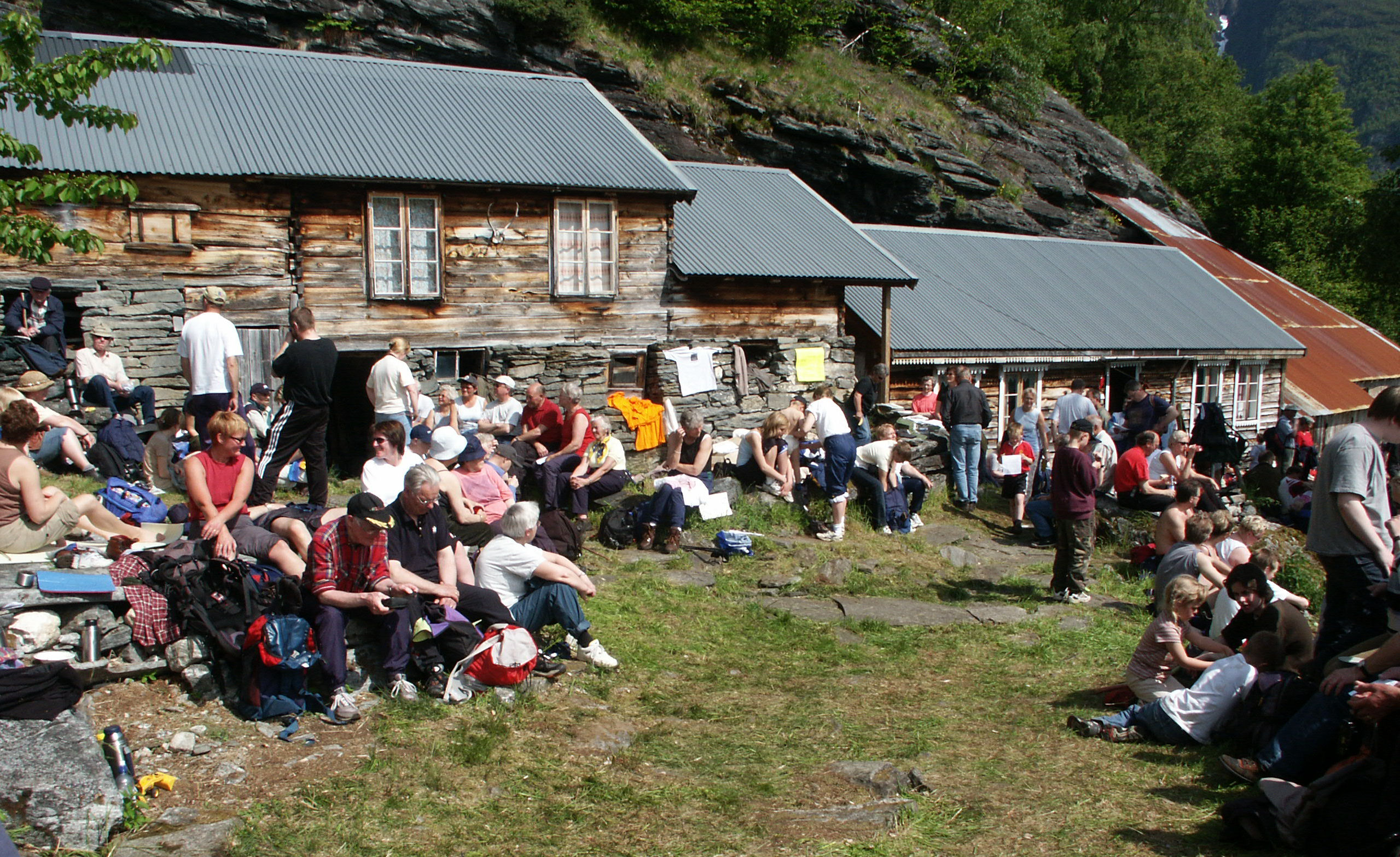
From the rally of Storfjordens Venner in June 2003.

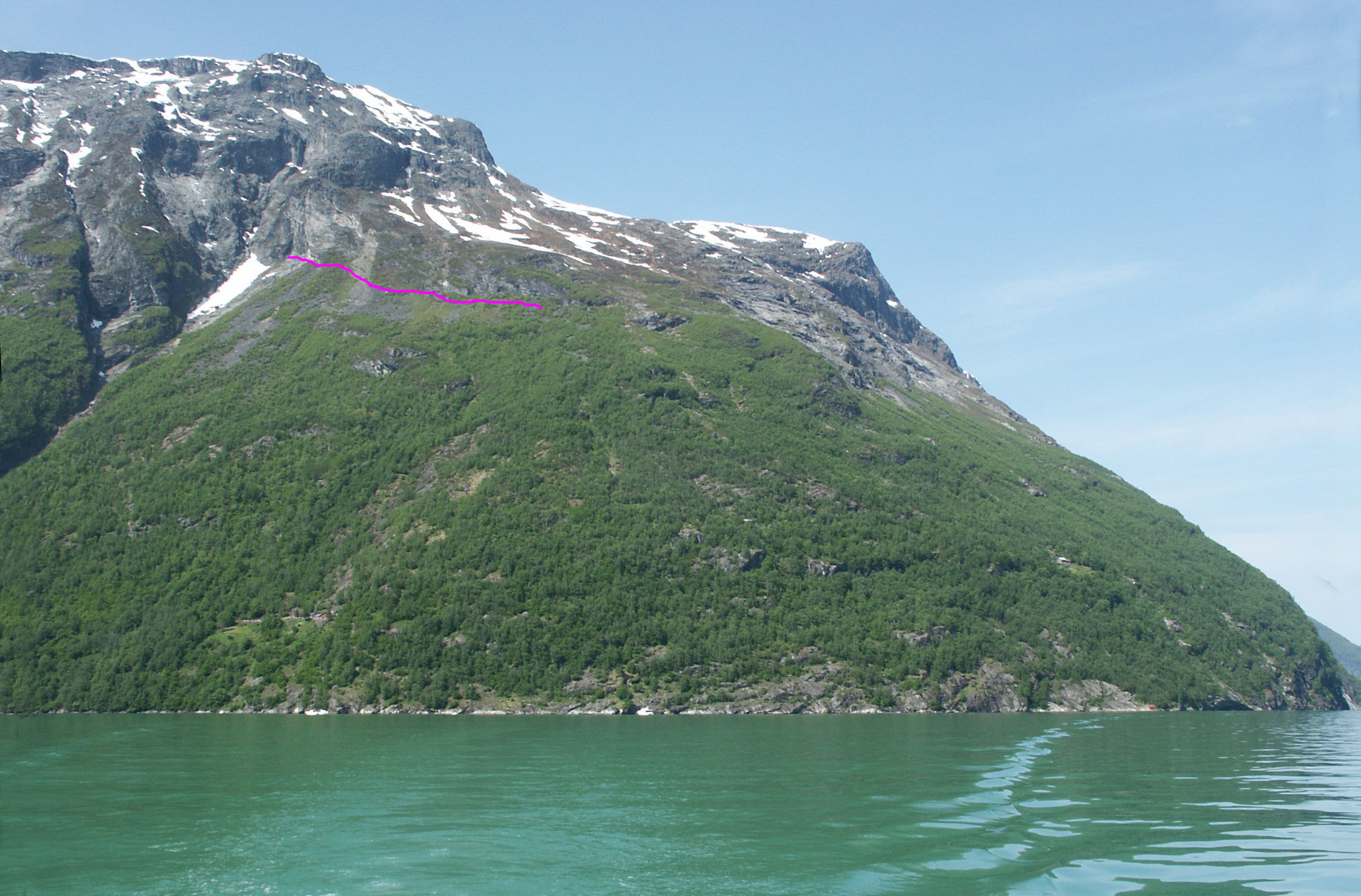
Åkernes, Me-Åkerneset headland, the farm in the lower part to the left in the hillside. The pink line identifies the Åkernes crevice.

== In popular culture ==
- Released in August 2015, The Wave (Norwegian: Bølgen) is a Norwegian disaster movie based on the premise of a rock slide from the mountain Åkerneset inundating the town of Geiranger.
