= Sunnylven Municipality =

Former municipality in Møre og Romsdal, Norway

Sunnylven Municipality Sunnylven herred
- Former municipality
- Sunnelven herred (historic name)
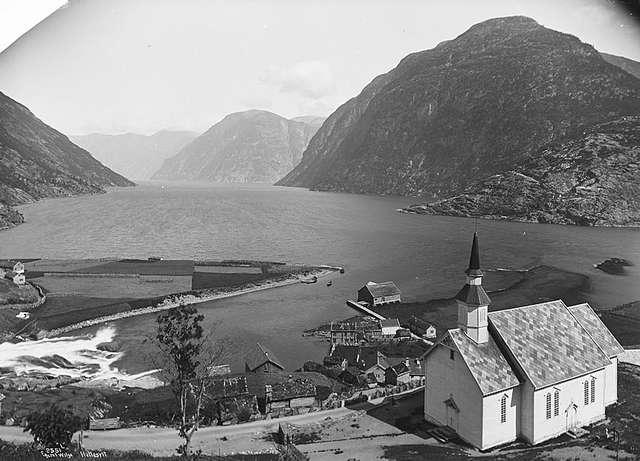
- View of Hellesylt and Sunnylven Church (1880s)

- Møre og Romsdal within Norway

- Sunnylven within Møre og Romsdal
- Coordinates: 62°05′07″N 06°51′57″E
- Country: Norway
- County: Møre og Romsdal
- District: Sunnmøre
- Established: 1 Jan 1838
  - Created as: Formannskapsdistrikt
- Disestablished: 1 Jan 1965
  - Succeeded by: Stranda Municipality
- Administrative centre: Hellesylt

Government
  - Mayor (1963-1964): Ivar N. Hole (V)

Area (upon dissolution)
  - Total: 566.3 km^{2} (218.6 sq mi)
  - Rank: #184 in Norway
- Highest elevation: 1,775.6 m (5,825 ft)

Population (1964)
  - Total: 1,226
  - Rank: #472 in Norway
  - Density: 2.2/km^{2} (5.7/sq mi)
  - Change (10 years): ▼ −5.6%
- Demonym: Sunnylving

Official language
  - Norwegian form: Nynorsk
- Time zone: UTC+01:00 (CET)
  - Summer (DST): UTC+02:00 (CEST)
- ISO 3166 code: NO-1523

Sunnylven is a former municipality in Møre og Romsdal county, Norway. The 566-square-kilometre (219 sq mi) municipality existed from 1838 until its dissolution in 1965. Since that time, it has made up the southern part of the present-day Stranda Municipality. It encompassed the areas around the Sunnylvsfjorden and Geirangerfjorden. The village of Hellesylt was the administrative centre of the municipality and Geiranger was the other main population centre in Sunnylven. The main church for the municipality was Sunnylven Church in Hellesylt.

Prior to its dissolution in 1965, the 566-square-kilometre (219 sq mi) municipality was the 184th largest by area out of the 525 municipalities in Norway. Sunnylven Municipality was the 472nd most populous municipality in Norway with a population of about 1,226. The municipality's population density was 2.2 inhabitants per square kilometre (5.7/sq mi) and its population had decreased by 5.6% over the previous 10-year period.

== General information ==
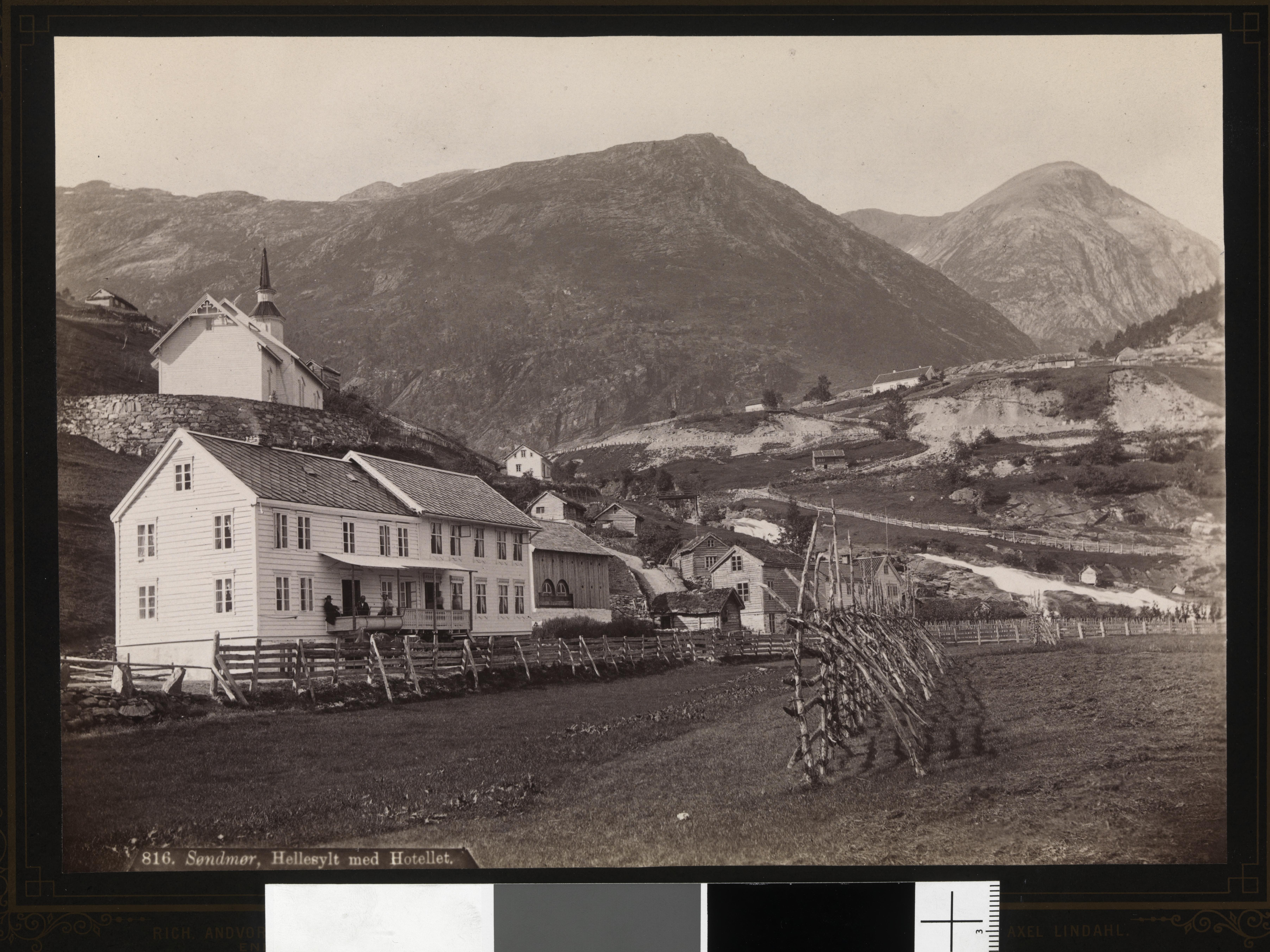
View of a hotel in Hellesylt c. 1885

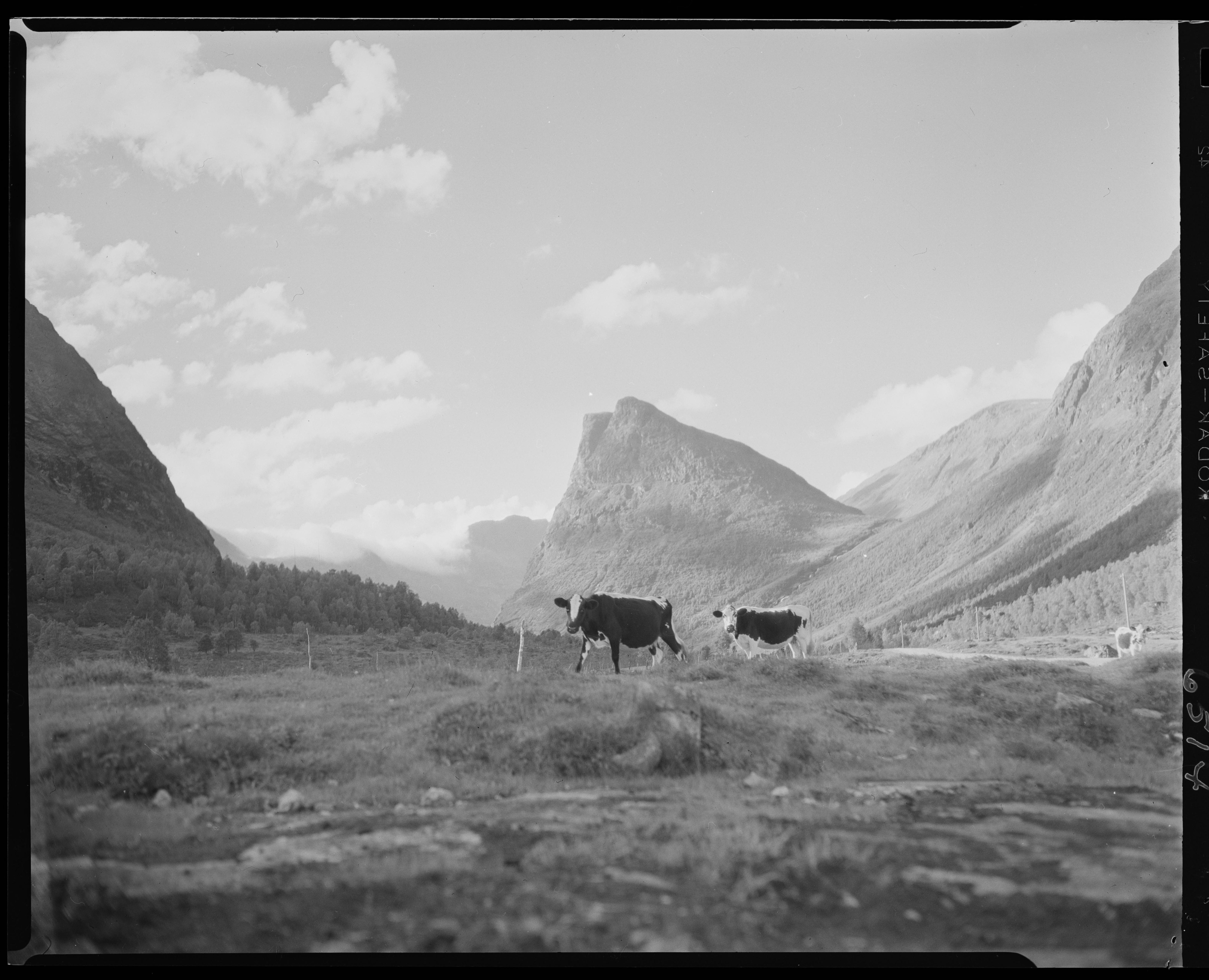
View of a farm in Sunnylven

The municipality of Sunnylven was established on 1 January 1838 (see formannskapsdistrikt law). According to the 1835 census, Sunnylven had a population of 1,476.

During the 1960s, there were many municipal mergers across Norway due to the work of the Schei Committee. On 1 January 1965, Sunnylven Municipality (population: 1,221) and Stranda Municipality (population: 3,453) were merged to form a new, larger Stranda Municipality.

=== Name ===
The municipality (originally the parish) is named after the Sunnylvsfjorden (Old Norse: Sunniflir). The first element is suðr which means "southern". This is likely referring to the fact that the main Storfjorden splits into two branches: Norddalsfjorden (in the north) and Sunnylvsfjorden (in the south). The last element is iflir which is frequently used in the Sunnmøre area in the names of fjords. It possibly comes from the word viflir which means "low, wet terrain".

Historically, the name of the municipality was spelled Sunnelven. On 3 November 1917, a royal resolution changed the spelling of the name of the municipality to Sunnylven.

=== Churches ===
The Church of Norway had two parishes (sokn) within Sunnylven Municipality. At the time of the municipal dissolution, it was part of the Sunnylven prestegjeld and the Austre Sunnmøre prosti (deanery) in the Diocese of Nidaros.

Churches in Sunnylven Municipality
Parish (sokn)	Church name	Location of the church	Year built
Geiranger	Geiranger Church	Geiranger	1842
Sunnylven	Sunnylven Church	Hellesylt	1859

== Geography ==
The municipality encompassed the areas around the Sunnylvsfjorden and Geirangerfjorden. The highest point in the municipality was the 1,775.6-metre (5,825 ft) tall mountain Blåfjellet, near the border with Norddal Municipality. Hjørundfjord Municipality was located to the northwest, Stranda Municipality was located to the north, Norddal Municipality was located to the east, Skjåk Municipality was located to the southeast (in Oppland county), and Stryn Municipality was located to the south (in Sogn og Fjordane county).

== Government ==
While it existed, Sunnylven Municipality was responsible for primary education (through 10th grade), outpatient health services, senior citizen services, welfare and other social services, zoning, economic development, and municipal roads and utilities. The municipality was governed by a municipal council of directly elected representatives. The mayor was indirectly elected by a vote of the municipal council. The municipality was under the jurisdiction of the Frostating Court of Appeal.

=== Municipal council ===
The municipal council (Heradsstyre) of Sunnylven Municipality was made up of 17 representatives that were elected to four year terms. The tables below show the historical composition of the council by political party.

Sunnylven heradsstyre 1963–1964
Party name (in Nynorsk)	Number of representatives
Local List(s) (Lokale lister)	17
Total number of members:	17
Note: On 1 January 1965, Sunnylven Municipality became part of Stranda Municipality.

Sunnylven heradsstyre 1959–1963
Party name (in Nynorsk)	Number of representatives
Local List(s) (Lokale lister)	17
Total number of members:	17

Sunnylven heradsstyre 1955–1959
Party name (in Nynorsk)	Number of representatives
Local List(s) (Lokale lister)	15
Total number of members:	15

Sunnylven heradsstyre 1951–1955
Party name (in Nynorsk)	Number of representatives
Local List(s) (Lokale lister)	16
Total number of members:	16

Sunnylven heradsstyre 1947–1951
Party name (in Nynorsk)	Number of representatives
Local List(s) (Lokale lister)	16
Total number of members:	16

Sunnylven heradsstyre 1945–1947
Party name (in Nynorsk)	Number of representatives
Local List(s) (Lokale lister)	16
Total number of members:	16

Sunnylven heradsstyre 1937–1941*
Party name (in Nynorsk)	Number of representatives
Local List(s) (Lokale lister)	16
Total number of members:	16
Note: Due to the German occupation of Norway during World War II, no elections were held for new municipal councils until after the war ended in 1945.

=== Mayors ===
The mayor (Nynorsk: ordførar) of Sunnylven Municipality was the political leader of the municipality and the chairperson of the municipal council. The following people have held this position:

- 1838–1844: Amund Olsen Kjelstad
- 1844–1848: Knut Syltevig
- 1849–1864: Nils O. Langeland
- 1864–1866: Andreas Stadheim
- 1866–1870: Knut Syltevig
- 1870–1877: Andreas Stadheim
- 1877–1878: Lars S. Gjørvad
- 1878–1914: Ole Ingebrigtsen Langeland (V)
- 1914–1920: Peter Andreas Lillebø
- 1920–1941: Knut Stadheim
- 1941–1944: Peter A. Gausdal (NS)
- 1945–1945: Knut Stadheim
- 1946–1948: Peder Kristian Frøysa
- 1948–1951: Aamund Lillebø
- 1951–1955: Stefan Aasen
- 1955–1959: Ivar N. Hole (V)
- 1959–1963: Knut Martin Stadheim
- 1963–1964: Ivar N. Hole (V)

== See also ==
- List of former municipalities of Norway
