= Asbjørn Gjærde =

Norwegian journalist

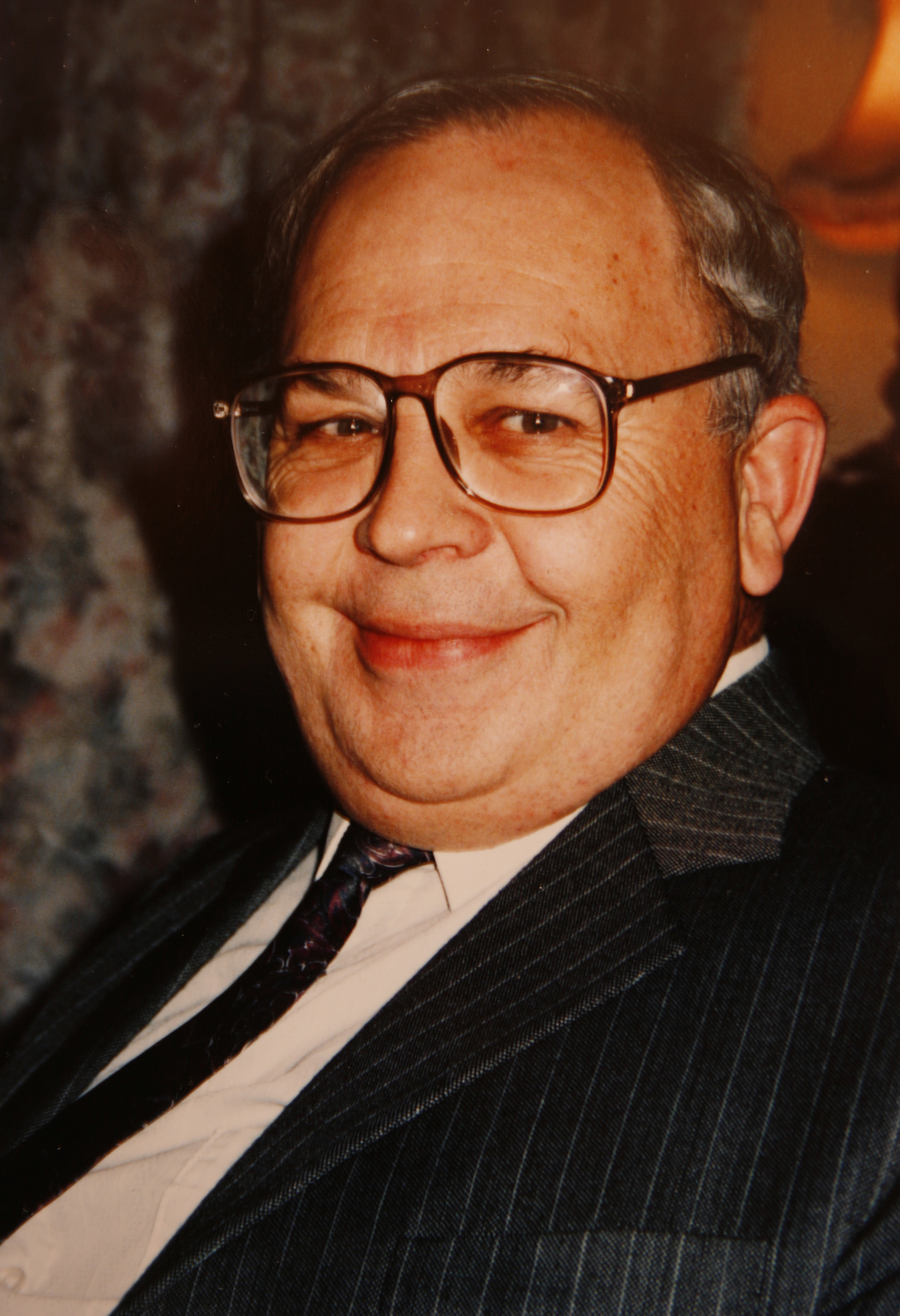
Asbjørn Gjærde

Asbjørn Gjærde (born 5 December 1939, in Stranda Municipality, Sunnmøre) is a Norwegian journalist and writer. He was the head of the Norwegian Broadcasting Corporation (NRK) office in Møre og Romsdal, based in Ålesund from 1981-1997. Thereafter in a free position as editor with office at the same location, but then as centrally NRK employed.

Asbjørn Gjærde retired at the end of 2007 after 43 years of employment at NRK.

== Books ==
- Stranda idrottslag 1914 50 år 1964 by Asbjørn Gjærde og Ove Langlo, Stranda Idrottslag, 1965, 142 pp.
- Stranda ungdomslag 1893 75 år 1968 by Asbjørn Gjærde og Harald Kjølås, Stranda Ungdomslag, 1968, 176 pp.
- Stranda Industri og Samfunn by Asbjørn Gjærde, Stranda Sogelag, Ålesund, 1990, 306 pp. ISBN 82-992249-1-8.
- Kunstneren Terje Fagermo by Asbjørn Gjærde, 1999.
- Vandring i flere dimensjoner på flatt lerret by Asbjørn Gjærde, Terje Fagermo og Peder Otto Dybvig, 1999,
- Grunnleggjaren av Møbelindustrien by Asbjørn Gjærde s. 157-162 in 100 år 100 navn. Personer som har preget hundreåret på Nordvestlandet, Sunnmørsposten Forlag, 2000, ISBN 82-91450-08-0.
- Bjarne Haagensen Fiskehandler og byutvikler by Asbjørn Gjærde, Ålesund 2001.119 pp. ISBN 82-996174-0-5.
- Vel møtt til sending. Kringkastinga i Møre og Romsdal 1925-2005 by Asbjørn Gjærde, 2005, 239 pp. Høgskulen i Volda, Avdeling for mediefag, ISBN 978-82-7661-237-0.
- Kosberg, en god idé by Asbjørn Gjærde, 2006, 439 pp. ISBN 82-92055-10-X.
- Vel bekomme! Eit knippe muntre historier frå NRK Møre og Romsdal samla og redigert by Asbjørn Gjærde; illustrert av Odd Tarberg, Ålesund, 2006, NRK Møre og Romsdal.
- Galleri J. Aasen - Med sans for klangen i bildene by Asbjørn Gjærde, Ålesund 2008, 64 pp., Galleri J. Aasen, ISBN 978-82-303-1185-1.
- Kunstnaren Ole Solbakken av Asbjørn Gjærde, Stranda Sogelag, 2011, 125 pp. ISBN 978-82-92055-38-0.
- "Terje Fagermo" av Asbjørn Gjærde, Jubileumsbok om kunstneren,2012, 169 pp. ISBN 978-82-92055-42-7.≤
