= Geiranger–Hellesylt Ferry =

Ferry service in Norway

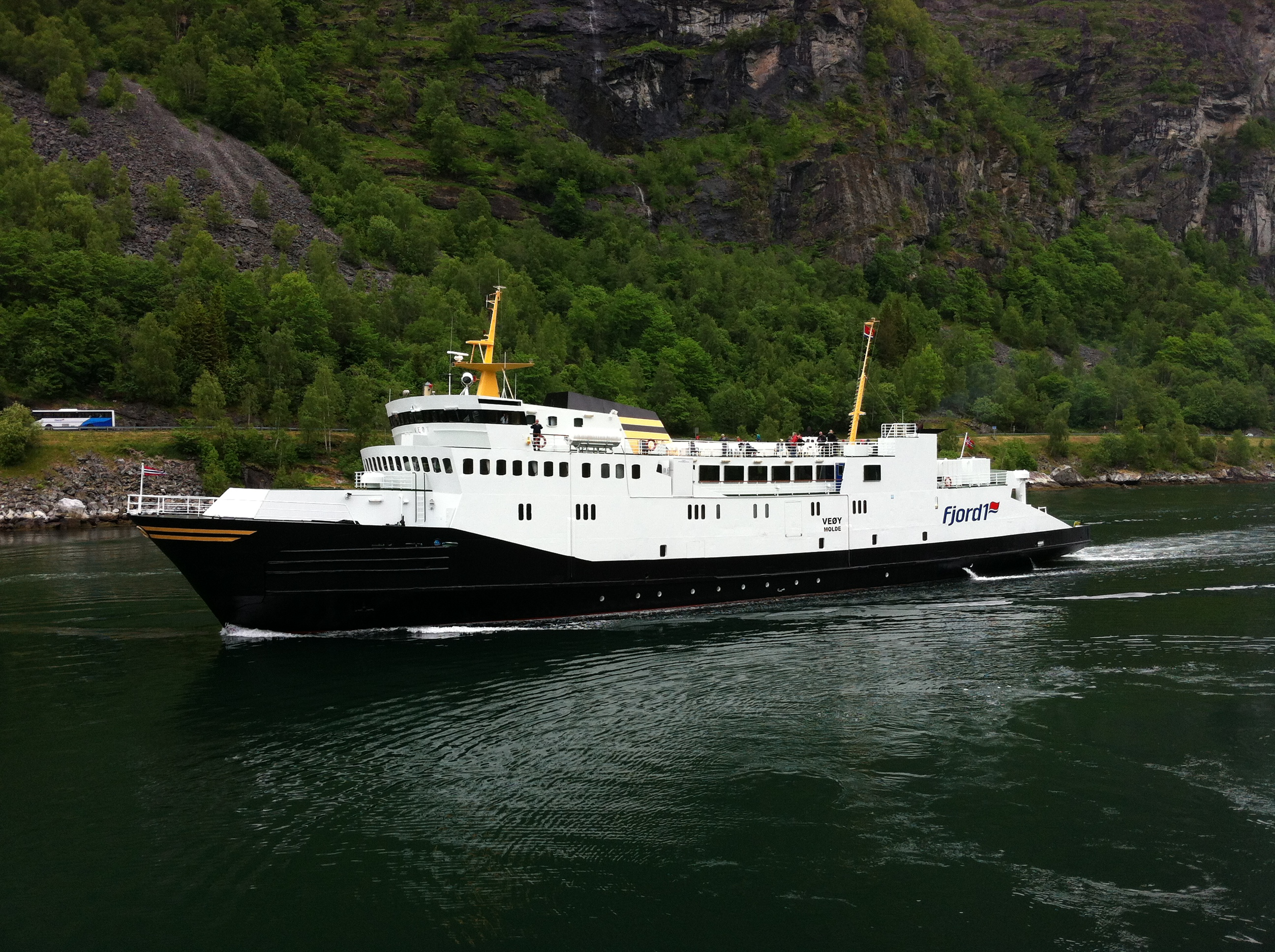
M/S Veøy on the Geirangerfjorden.

The Geiranger–Hellesylt Ferry is a ferry service in Norway between the villages of Geiranger and Hellesylt both located within Stranda Municipality in Møre og Romsdal county. The 20-kilometre (12 mi) trip takes just over an hour. The route passes all the highlights of the Geirangerfjord and is therefore very popular with tourists.
