= Hellesylt =

Village in Stranda Municipality, Norway

- Village
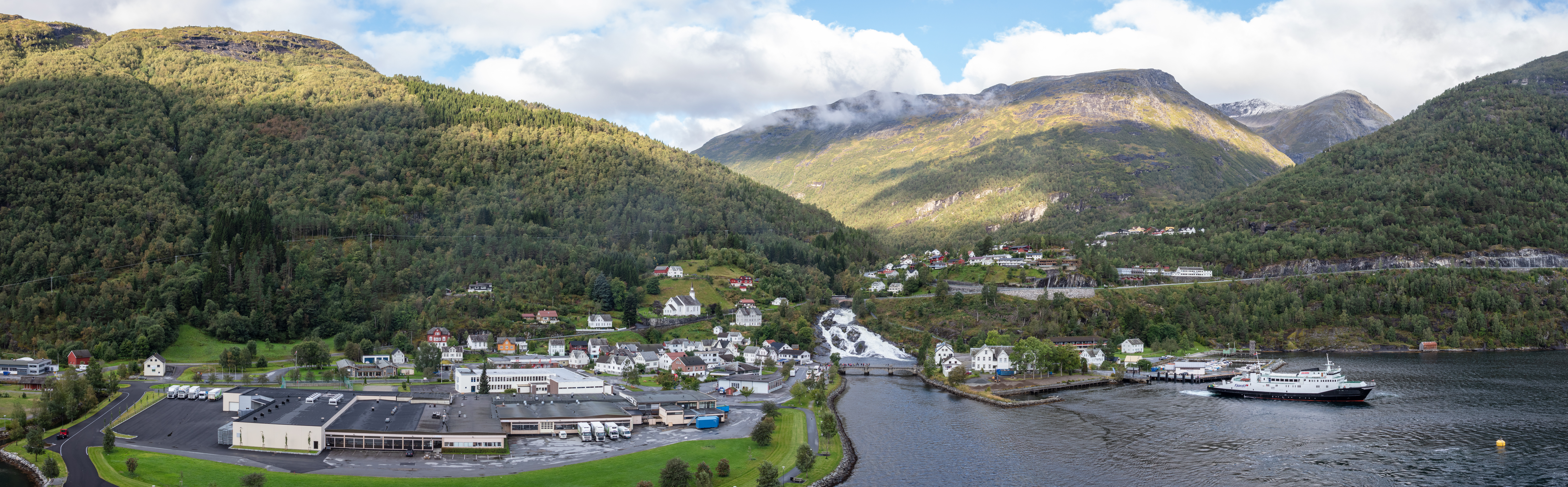
- View of Hellesylt
- Interactive map of Hellesylt
- Location within Møre og Romsdal Location within Norway
- Coordinates: 62.0855°N 6.8677°E
- Country: Norway
- Region: Western Norway
- County: Møre og Romsdal
- District: Sunnmøre
- Municipality: Stranda Municipality

Area
  - Total: 0.43 km^{2} (0.17 sq mi)
- Elevation: 3 m (9.8 ft)

Population (2024)
  - Total: 240
  - Density: 558/km^{2} (1,450/sq mi)
- Time zone: UTC+01:00 (CET)
  - Summer (DST): UTC+02:00 (CEST)
- Post Code: 6218 Hellesylt

Hellesylt is a small village in Stranda Municipality in Møre og Romsdal county, Norway. The village lies at the head of the Sunnylvsfjorden, which is a branch of the Storfjorden, and which the Geirangerfjorden in turn branches off nearby.

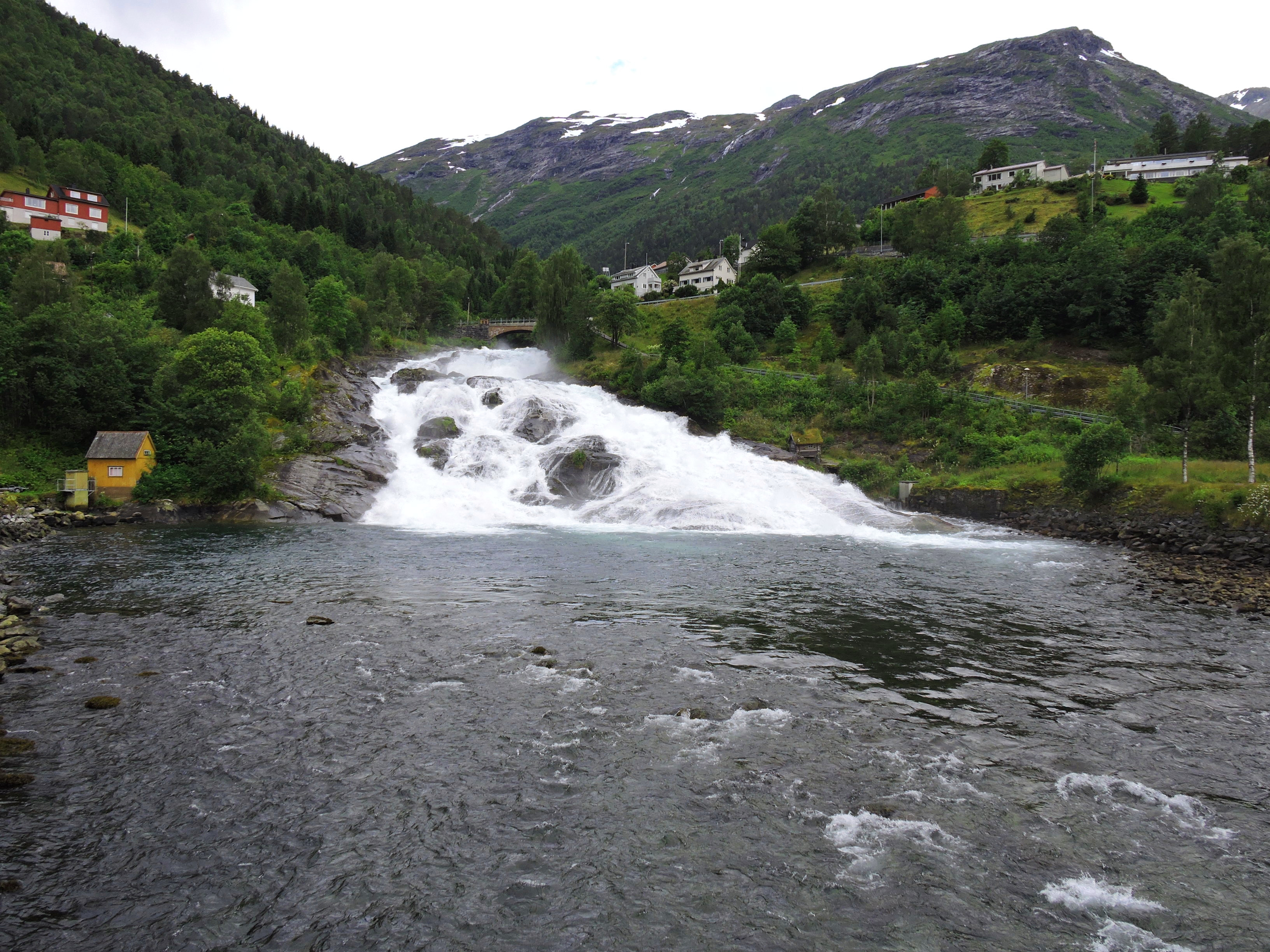
Waterfall of Hellesylt

The 0.43-square-kilometre (110-acre) village has a population (2024) of 240 and a population density of 558 inhabitants per square kilometre (1,450/sq mi).

In the summertime, thousands of tourists travel through or stay in Hellesylt each day. Most of them take the Geiranger–Hellesylt Ferry to the nearby village of Geiranger, which in high season runs every one and a half hours. There is also a cruise ship pier that can handle very large ships. The village is surrounded by mountains and valleys. The Sunnylven Church is located in the village. Hellesylt was the administrative center of the former Sunnylven Municipality.

Hellesylt is under constant threat from the mountain Åkerneset, which is about to erode into the Sunnylvsfjord. A collapse could cause a megatsunami in the fjord which would destroy most of the village Hellesylt.

== In popular culture ==
- The 1991 Icelandic film The White Viking was shot in Hellesylt.
- Released in March 2016, "The Wave" (Norwegian: Bølgen) is a Norwegian disaster movie based on the premise of a rock slide from the mountain Åkerneset.
- The fictional city of Kattegat in the tv-series Vikings used Hellesynt as the backdrop. The series is shot in Wicklow, Ireland and digitally inserted Hellesylt in the background.
