= Stranda Municipality =

Municipality in Møre og Romsdal, Norway

Stranda Municipality Stranda kommune
- Municipality
- Stranden herred (historic name)
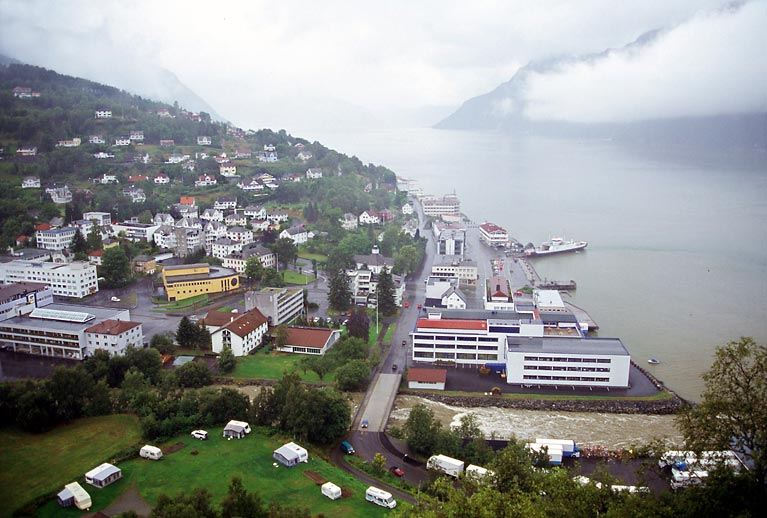
- View of the village of Stranda

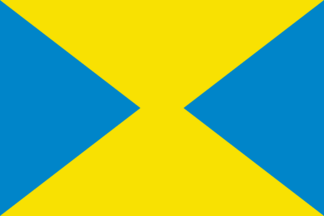
- Flag Coat of arms

- Møre og Romsdal within Norway

- Stranda within Møre og Romsdal
- Coordinates: 62°11′29″N 06°56′56″E
- Country: Norway
- County: Møre og Romsdal
- District: Sunnmøre
- Established: 1 Jan 1838
  - Created as: Formannskapsdistrikt
- Administrative centre: Stranda

Government
  - Mayor (2023): Einar Arve Nordang (H)

Area
  - Total: 865.86 km^{2} (334.31 sq mi)
  - Land: 844.63 km^{2} (326.11 sq mi)
  - Water: 21.23 km^{2} (8.20 sq mi) 2.5%
  - Rank: #134 in Norway
- Highest elevation: 1,775.6 m (5,825 ft)

Population (2024)
  - Total: 4,348
  - Rank: #196 in Norway
  - Density: 5/km^{2} (13/sq mi)
  - Change (10 years): ▼ −5.8%
- Demonym(s): Strandar; Strander

Official language
  - Norwegian form: Nynorsk
- Time zone: UTC+01:00 (CET)
  - Summer (DST): UTC+02:00 (CEST)
- ISO 3166 code: NO-1525
- Website: Official website

Stranda is a municipality in Møre og Romsdal county, Norway. It is part of the Sunnmøre region. The administrative centre of the municipality is the village of Stranda. Stranda consists of three smaller villages and one larger central village. The smaller villages are Hellesylt, Geiranger, and Liabygda. The central village, Stranda (same name as the municipality), has about 2,600 inhabitants. Stranda Municipality is known for tourist attractions such as Geirangerfjorden, Sunnylvsfjorden, and the ski area at Strandafjellet.

The 866-square-kilometre (334 sq mi) municipality is the 134th largest by area out of the 357 municipalities in Norway. Stranda Municipality is the 196th most populous municipality in Norway with a population of 4,348. The municipality's population density is 5 inhabitants per square kilometre (13/sq mi) and its population has decreased by 5.8% over the previous 10-year period.

== General information ==
The parish of Stranden was established as a municipality on 1 January 1838 (see formannskapsdistrikt law). On 1 January 1892, the northern district of the municipality (population: 850) was separated to form the new Stordal Municipality. This left Stranda Municipality with 1,459 residents. The spelling was changed to Stranda in 1918.

During the 1960s, there were many municipal mergers across Norway due to the work of the Schei Committee. On 1 January 1965, Sunnylven Municipality (population: 1,221) was merged into Stranda Municipality (population: 3,453), forming a new, larger Stranda Municipality.

=== Name ===
The municipality (originally the parish) is named Stranda (Old Norse: Strǫnd) after a portion of the beach area along the Storfjorden. The name comes from the word strǫnd, which means 'beach' or 'strand'. Historically, the name of the municipality was spelled Stranden. On 3 November 1917, a royal resolution changed the spelling of the name of the municipality to Stranda.

=== Coat of arms ===
The coat of arms was granted on 2 May 1986. The official blazon is "Or, two piles azure issuant from dexter and sinister" (Norwegian: På gull grunn to spisse blå flankar). This means the arms have a field (background) has a tincture of Or which means it is commonly colored yellow, but if it is made out of metal, then gold is used. The charge is two blue piles (triangles) extending from the left and right sides, but not quite meeting in the middle. The colors and design were chosen to symbolize the fjords and mountains hovering over the beach since the fjord is a central feature of the municipality for transportation, production, and tourism. The arms were designed by Jarle Skuseth after a proposal by Tor Torheim. The municipal flag has the same design as the coat of arms.

=== Churches ===
The Church of Norway has four parishes (sokn) within Stranda Municipality. It is part of the Nordre Sunnmøre prosti (deanery) in the Diocese of Møre.

Churches in Stranda Municipality
Parish (sokn)	Church name	Location of the church	Year built
Stranda	Stranda Church	Stranda	1838
Liabygda	Liabygda Church	Liabygda	1917
Sunnylven	Sunnylven Church	Hellesylt	1859
Geiranger	Geiranger Church	Geiranger	1842

== Geography ==
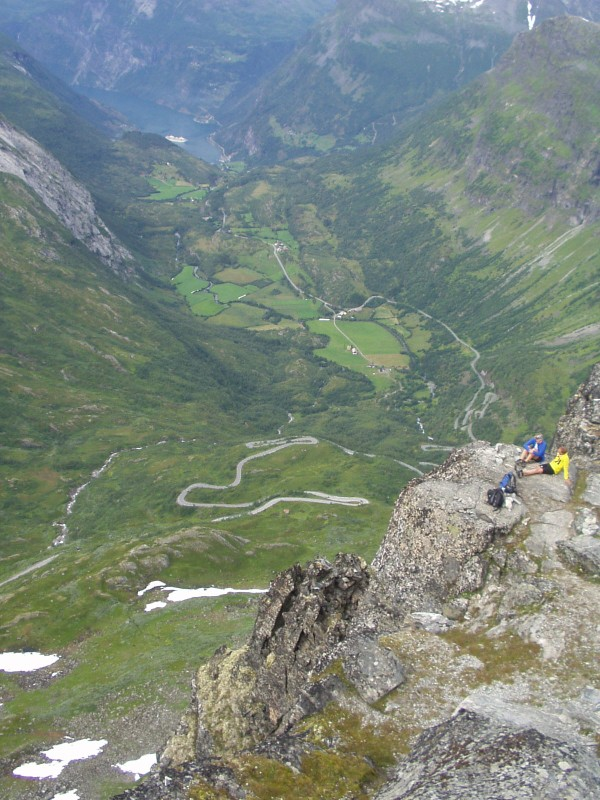
The Geirangerfjord as seen from Dalsnibba

Due to its natural environment, this scenic fjord and mountain area attracts many tourists each year. The Storfjorden, Sunnylvsfjorden, and Geirangerfjorden flow through the municipality with tall mountains surrounding the water. The Seven Sisters waterfall is located along the Geirangerfjord. The highest point in the municipality is the 1,775.6-metre (5,825 ft) tall mountain Blåfjellet. The mountain Dalsnibba and the lake Djupvatnet are located along Norwegian County Road 63 in the southern part of the municipality. The mountains of Kvitegga and Hornindalsrokken lie on the southern municipal border.

Fjord Municipality lies to the north and east, Skjåk Municipality (in Innlandet county) lies to the southeast, Stryn Municipality (in Vestland county) lies to the south, Volda Municipality and Ørsta Municipality lie to the west, and Sykkylven Municipality lies to the northwest.

=== UNESCO World heritage site ===
The West Norwegian Fjords, entailing Geirangerfjord and Nærøyfjord was inscribed on UNESCO's World Heritage List in 2005 at the 29th Session of the World Heritage Committee in Durban, South Africa. The West Norwegian Fjords is the first natural World Heritage site in Norway, and the third natural site in the Nordic – Baltic region.

The West Norwegian Fjords are characterised as the best geologically developed and preserved example of classic fjord landscape. The geology and ongoing erosional processes have provided a basis for the active development of ecological and biological processes as well as the development of traditional, in part extreme, land use that has not harmed the integrity of the natural site.

== Government ==
Stranda Municipality is responsible for primary education (through 10th grade), outpatient health services, senior citizen services, welfare and other social services, zoning, economic development, and municipal roads and utilities. The municipality is governed by a municipal council of directly elected representatives. The mayor is indirectly elected by a vote of the municipal council. The municipality is under the jurisdiction of the Sunnmøre District Court and the Frostating Court of Appeal.

=== Municipal council ===
The municipal council (Kommunestyre) of Stranda Municipality is made up of 25 representatives that are elected to four year terms. The tables below show the current and historical composition of the council by political party.

Stranda kommunestyre 2023–2027
Party name (in Nynorsk)	Number of representatives
Labour Party (Arbeidarpartiet)	3
Progress Party (Framstegspartiet)	7
Conservative Party (Høgre)	7
Christian Democratic Party (Kristeleg Folkeparti)	1
Centre Party (Senterpartiet)	7
Total number of members:	25

Stranda kommunestyre 2019–2023
Party name (in Nynorsk)	Number of representatives
Labour Party (Arbeidarpartiet)	3
Progress Party (Framstegspartiet)	5
Green Party (Miljøpartiet Dei Grøne)	1
Conservative Party (Høgre)	3
Christian Democratic Party (Kristeleg Folkeparti)	1
Centre Party (Senterpartiet)	12
Total number of members:	25

Stranda kommunestyre 2015–2019
Party name (in Nynorsk)	Number of representatives
Labour Party (Arbeidarpartiet)	3
Progress Party (Framstegspartiet)	5
Conservative Party (Høgre)	3
Christian Democratic Party (Kristeleg Folkeparti)	2
Centre Party (Senterpartiet)	11
Liberal Party (Venstre)	1
Total number of members:	25

Stranda kommunestyre 2011–2015
Party name (in Nynorsk)	Number of representatives
Labour Party (Arbeidarpartiet)	3
Progress Party (Framstegspartiet)	8
Conservative Party (Høgre)	3
Christian Democratic Party (Kristeleg Folkeparti)	2
Centre Party (Senterpartiet)	8
Liberal Party (Venstre)	1
Total number of members:	25

Stranda kommunestyre 2007–2011
Party name (in Nynorsk)	Number of representatives
Labour Party (Arbeidarpartiet)	2
Progress Party (Framstegspartiet)	12
Conservative Party (Høgre)	2
Christian Democratic Party (Kristeleg Folkeparti)	2
Centre Party (Senterpartiet)	4
Socialist Left Party (Sosialistisk Venstreparti)	1
Liberal Party (Venstre)	2
Total number of members:	25

Stranda kommunestyre 2003–2007
Party name (in Nynorsk)	Number of representatives
Labour Party (Arbeidarpartiet)	3
Progress Party (Framstegspartiet)	9
Conservative Party (Høgre)	3
Christian Democratic Party (Kristeleg Folkeparti)	3
Centre Party (Senterpartiet)	3
Socialist Left Party (Sosialistisk Venstreparti)	2
Total number of members:	23

Stranda kommunestyre 1999–2003
Party name (in Nynorsk)	Number of representatives
Labour Party (Arbeidarpartiet)	4
Progress Party (Framstegspartiet)	5
Conservative Party (Høgre)	5
Christian Democratic Party (Kristeleg Folkeparti)	4
Centre Party (Senterpartiet)	5
Liberal Party (Venstre)	2
Total number of members:	25

Stranda kommunestyre 1995–1999
Party name (in Nynorsk)	Number of representatives
Labour Party (Arbeidarpartiet)	5
Conservative Party (Høgre)	5
Christian Democratic Party (Kristeleg Folkeparti)	8
Centre Party (Senterpartiet)	8
Liberal Party (Venstre)	3
Total number of members:	29

Stranda kommunestyre 1991–1995
Party name (in Nynorsk)	Number of representatives
Labour Party (Arbeidarpartiet)	5
Progress Party (Framstegspartiet)	1
Conservative Party (Høgre)	7
Christian Democratic Party (Kristeleg Folkeparti)	5
Centre Party (Senterpartiet)	5
Liberal Party (Venstre)	1
Local list for Sunnylven (Bygdeliste for Sunnylven)	5
Total number of members:	29

Stranda kommunestyre 1987–1991
Party name (in Nynorsk)	Number of representatives
Labour Party (Arbeidarpartiet)	6
Conservative Party (Høgre)	7
Christian Democratic Party (Kristeleg Folkeparti)	5
Centre Party (Senterpartiet)	3
Liberal Party (Venstre)	3
Local list for Sunnylven (Bygdeliste for Sunnylven)	5
Total number of members:	29

Stranda kommunestyre 1983–1987
Party name (in Nynorsk)	Number of representatives
Labour Party (Arbeidarpartiet)	8
Conservative Party (Høgre)	6
Christian Democratic Party (Kristeleg Folkeparti)	5
Centre Party (Senterpartiet)	3
Liberal Party (Venstre)	3
Local list for Sunnylven (Bygdeliste for Sunnylven)	4
Total number of members:	29

Stranda kommunestyre 1979–1983
Party name (in Nynorsk)	Number of representatives
Labour Party (Arbeidarpartiet)	6
Conservative Party (Høgre)	5
Christian Democratic Party (Kristeleg Folkeparti)	6
New People's Party (Nye Folkepartiet)	1
Centre Party (Senterpartiet)	4
Liberal Party (Venstre)	2
Local list for Sunnylven (Bygdaliste for Sunnylven)	4
Local list for Geiranger (Bygdeliste for Geiranger)	1
Total number of members:	29

Stranda kommunestyre 1975–1979
Party name (in Nynorsk)	Number of representatives
Labour Party (Arbeidarpartiet)	6
Conservative Party (Høgre)	2
Christian Democratic Party (Kristeleg Folkeparti)	6
New People's Party (Nye Folkepartiet)	2
Centre Party (Senterpartiet)	5
Liberal Party (Venstre)	2
Local list for Sunnylven (Bygdaliste for Sunnylven)	5
Local list for Geiranger (Bygdeliste for Geiranger)	1
Total number of members:	29

Stranda kommunestyre 1971–1975
Party name (in Nynorsk)	Number of representatives
Labour Party (Arbeidarpartiet)	8
Conservative Party (Høgre)	2
Christian Democratic Party (Kristeleg Folkeparti)	5
Centre Party (Senterpartiet)	10
Liberal Party (Venstre)	4
Total number of members:	29

Stranda kommunestyre 1967–1971
Party name (in Nynorsk)	Number of representatives
Labour Party (Arbeidarpartiet)	8
Conservative Party (Høgre)	2
Christian Democratic Party (Kristeleg Folkeparti)	5
Centre Party (Senterpartiet)	9
Liberal Party (Venstre)	5
Total number of members:	29

Stranda kommunestyre 1963–1967
Party name (in Nynorsk)	Number of representatives
Labour Party (Arbeidarpartiet)	6
Conservative Party (Høgre)	2
Christian Democratic Party (Kristeleg Folkeparti)	5
Centre Party (Senterpartiet)	5
Liberal Party (Venstre)	3
Total number of members:	21
Note: On 1 January 1965, Sunnylven Municipality became part of Stranda Municipality.

Stranda heradsstyre 1959–1963
Party name (in Nynorsk)	Number of representatives
Labour Party (Arbeidarpartiet)	6
Conservative Party (Høgre)	1
Christian Democratic Party (Kristeleg Folkeparti)	6
Centre Party (Senterpartiet)	4
Liberal Party (Venstre)	3
Local List(s) (Lokale lister)	1
Total number of members:	21

Stranda heradsstyre 1955–1959
Party name (in Nynorsk)	Number of representatives
Labour Party (Arbeidarpartiet)	5
Local List(s) (Lokale lister)	16
Total number of members:	21

Stranda heradsstyre 1951–1955
Party name (in Nynorsk)	Number of representatives
Labour Party (Arbeidarpartiet)	2
Local List(s) (Lokale lister)	14
Total number of members:	16

Stranda heradsstyre 1947–1951
Party name (in Nynorsk)	Number of representatives
Labour Party (Arbeidarpartiet)	2
Local List(s) (Lokale lister)	14
Total number of members:	16

Stranda heradsstyre 1945–1947
Party name (in Nynorsk)	Number of representatives
Labour Party (Arbeidarpartiet)	2
Local List(s) (Lokale lister)	14
Total number of members:	16

Stranda heradsstyre 1937–1941*
Party name (in Nynorsk)	Number of representatives
Labour Party (Arbeidarpartiet)	1
Local List(s) (Lokale lister)	15
Total number of members:	16
Note: Due to the German occupation of Norway during World War II, no elections were held for new municipal councils until after the war ended in 1945.

=== Mayors ===
The mayor (Nynorsk: ordførar) of Stranda Municipality is the political leader of the municipality and the chairperson of the municipal council. Here is a list of people who have held this position:

- 1838–1840: Nicolay Hansen Engeset
- 1841–1855: Severin Knutsen Overvoll
- 1856–1883: Knut Olson Myklebust
- 1884–1885: Lars Martinussen Kirkebøe
- 1886–1889: Hans J. Ringstad
- 1890–1901: Peter C. Ous
- 1902–1904: Hans J. Ringstad
- 1905–1913: Peter C. Ous
- 1914–1931: Karl J. Andeberg
- 1931–1937: Claus P. Ous
- 1938–1943: Nils E. Ringset
- 1945–1945: Nils E. Ringset
- 1946–1955: Jørgen Marius Ivarsen Langlo (KrF)
- 1956–1957: Einar Holmgren
- 1957–1959: Ole S. Helsem (Bp)
- 1960–1963: Ingvald Langlo
- 1964–1965: Reidar Skarbø
- 1966–1967: Ole S. Helsem (Sp)
- 1968–1971: Rikard Urkedal
- 1972–1975: Leiv Berge
- 1976–1979: Oddmund Indreeide
- 1980–1987: Leiv Berge
- 1988–1991: Inge Gjærde
- 1992–1999: Anne Lise Lunde (KrF)
- 1999–2003: Inge Gjærde (H)
- 2003–2011: Frank Edvard Sve (FrP)
- 2011–2023: Jan Ove Tryggestad (Sp)
- 2023–present: Einar Arve Nordang (H)

== Tourism ==
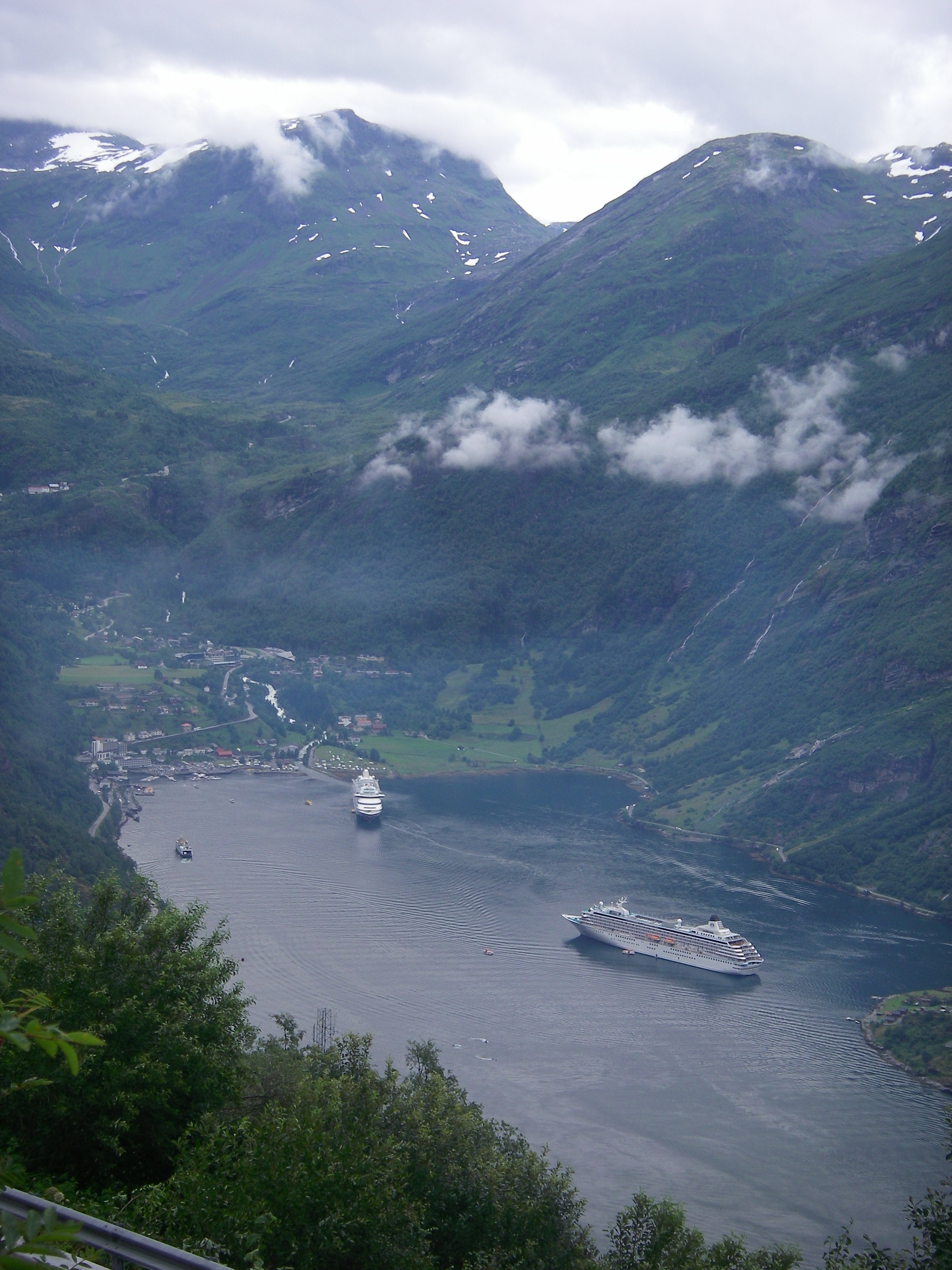
Cruise ships at Geiranger

Tourism has long and strong traditions in Stranda. The villages of Geiranger and Hellesylt have long been well-known destinations. The first cruise ship with tourists from abroad came to Geiranger in 1869. Today, Geiranger is the second largest cruise ship port in Norway, visited by 160 cruise ships every summer. The Coastal Steamer (Hurtigruten) runs daily round trips Ålesund-Geiranger from April to mid-September. Tourists can also take the Geiranger–Hellesylt Ferry. Altogether about 700,000 tourists visit Geiranger each summer.

Royal persons, especially Queen Sonja, have contributed to make the fjord famous all over the world. By annual trips, visiting, and even spending the night on these abandoned mountains farms such as Skageflå, and publishing a book about these trips with her own photos that have also been exhibited in New York, among other places. Other historic farms include Knivsflå and Me-Åkernes.

=== Culture ===
In Hellesylt, one may visit Hægstad Gård which contains woodcarvings, scenes from Peer Gynt by Henrik Ibsen, and in Geiranger the new Norwegian Fjord Centre shows local history and pictures from Geiranger.

== Sports and leisure ==
In the alpine area at Strandafjellet, there are six ski tows and alpine pistes. Each winter alpine competitions are hosted there. Strandafjellet is one of the few places in the world where one could actually ski from the top of a mountain and go the whole way down, to the fjord. Every year roughly 250 telemark skiers, alpine skiers, and snowboarders come together in the race Alperittet, from 1,230 metres (4,040 ft) above sea level and down to the fjord. The Geiranger – From Fjord to Summit race runs from Geiranger to Dalsnibba each year.

== Trade and industry ==
The municipality of Stranda has a great variety as to trade and industry. About 160 farms produce milk and meat products. Many factories have long traditions for making meat products, especially salted and cured meat. The production of furniture and textile products is an important industry that provides work to many area residents. Stranda is the place where P. I. Langlo industrialized the furniture industry in Norway in 1919. (There is almost no unemployment in the area). The Grandiosa factory, Norway's largest pizza factory, is situated in Stranda. There are also much aquafarming and many fish processing factories in the municipality. Tourism is, of course, a very important business in the whole district.

== In popular culture ==
- Released in March 2016, The Wave is a Norwegian disaster movie based on the premise of a rock slide from the mountain Åkerneset inundating the village of Geiranger.

== Notable people ==
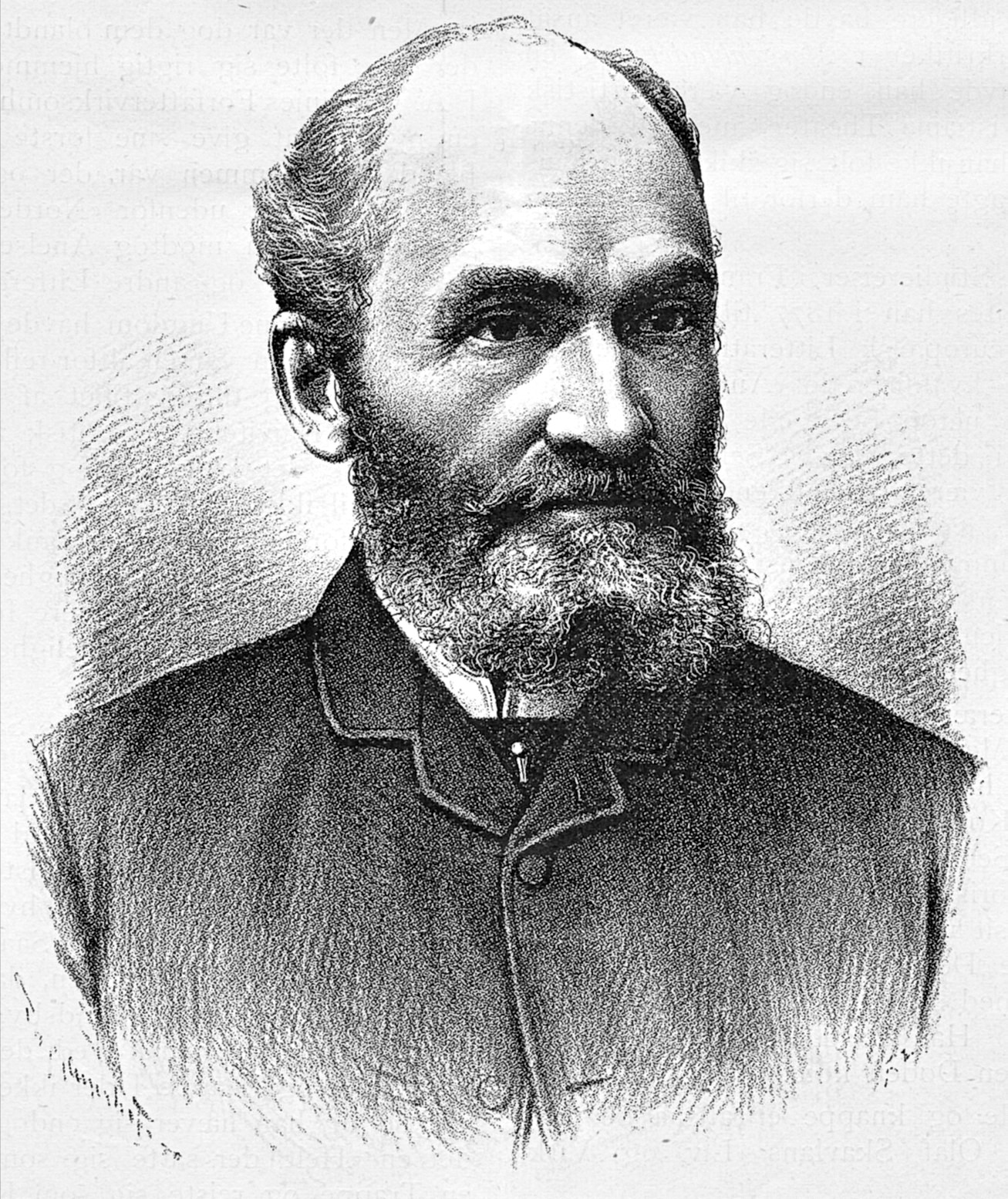
Olaf Skavlan, 1891

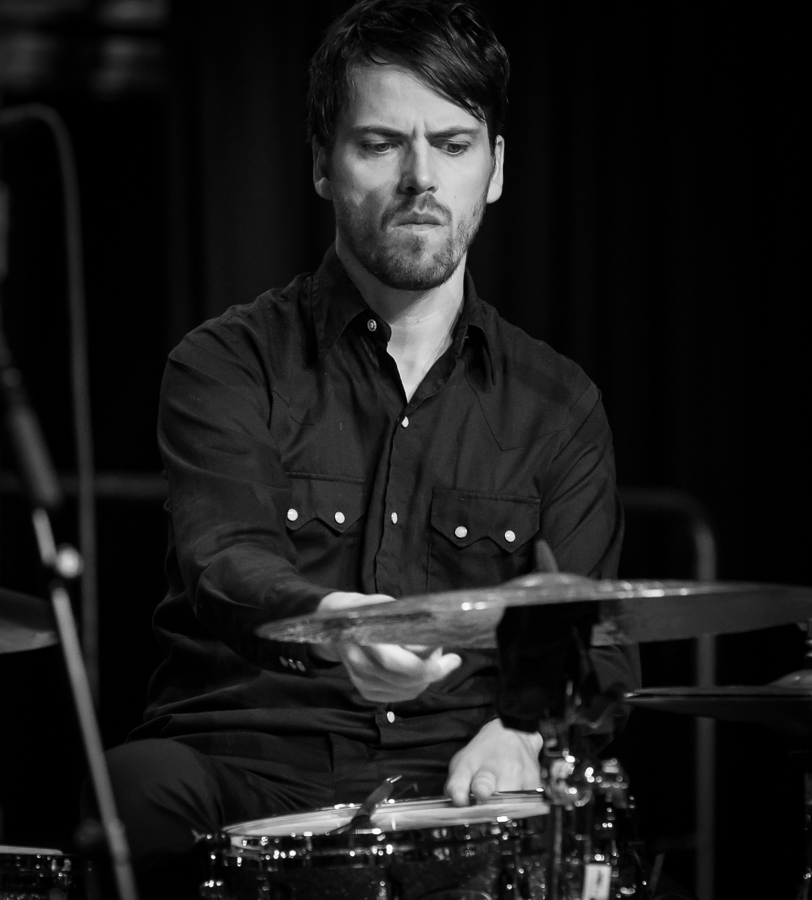
Øyvind Skarbø, 2016

- Olaf Skavlan (1838–1891), a literary historian and playwright
- Aadel Lampe (1857–1944), a women's rights leader, liberal politician, teacher for deaf children, and suffragist
- Olav Berntsen Oksvik (1887–1958), a politician and County Governor of Møre og Romsdal
- P.I. Langlo, (Norwegian Wiki) (1892–1940), a pioneer in the industrial manufacture of furniture
- Eiliv Odde Hauge (1913–1971) a military officer, screenwriter, author, museum director, and Norwegian resistance movement member
- Asbjørn Gjærde (born 1939), a journalist who worked for NRK for 43 years
- Peter Opsvik (born 1939), a furniture designer and jazz saxophonist
- Kjell A. Storeide (born 1952), a businessperson and CEO of Stokke Gruppen from 1990–2004
- Pål Øie, (Norwegian Wiki) (born 1961), a Norwegian film director
- Arve Henriksen (born 1968), a trumpeter
- Are Kalvø (born 1969), a writer and satirist
- Margreth Olin (born 1970), a film director, film producer, and screenwriter
- Bjarne Solbakken (born 1977), an alpine skier who competed in the 2002 and 2006 Winter Olympics
- Øyvind Skarbø (born 1982), a drummer and composer

== See also ==
- Norwegian Colony, a Norwegian community in California established by families from Stranda.
