= Axel Lindahl (photographer) =

Swedish photographer (1841–1906)

- Born: July 27, 1841; Mariestad, Sweden
- Died: December 11, 1906 (aged 65)
- Occupation: Photographer

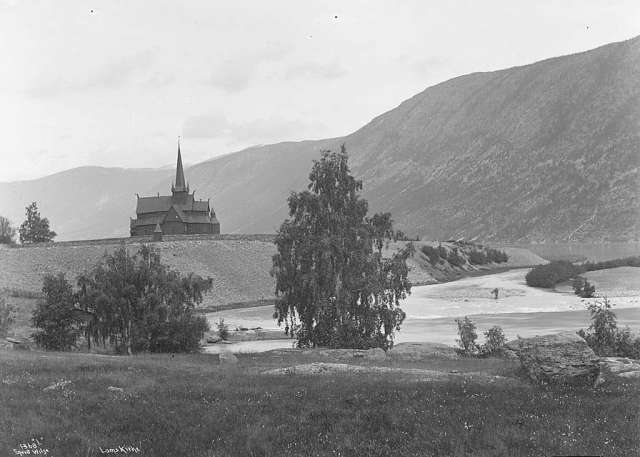
Lom stave church, by Lindahl

Axel Theodor Lindahl (27 July 1841 – 11 December 1906) was a Swedish photographer notable for his early photography of Norwegian landscapes.

Lindahl was born in Mariestad in southwestern Sweden. With his brother Udo he opened his own photography studio in Uddevalla in 1865; within one year, his work was exhibited in museums. By around 1867, he had moved his business to Gothenburg. Once established there, he extended his interest to landscape photography, focusing initially on the Swedish west coast, and then moving into Norway. In 1883 he sold his interest in the studio in Sweden and made Norwegian landscapes his exclusive area of business, working closely with the publisher Rich. Andvord.

Unlike many of his contemporary photographers who emphasized the dramatic nature of Norwegian landscapes, Lindahl sought in his composition the harmonious aesthetic of his subject matter.

He remained active throughout the 19th century and left over 3500 negative plates. These were taken over by Anders Beer Wilse and were passed through several owners until the Norwegian government took them over in 1991 and placed them in the archives of Norsk Folkemuseum in Oslo.
