= Norddal Municipality =

Former municipality in Møre og Romsdal, Norway

Norddal Municipality Norddal kommune
- Former municipality
- Norddalen herred (historic name)
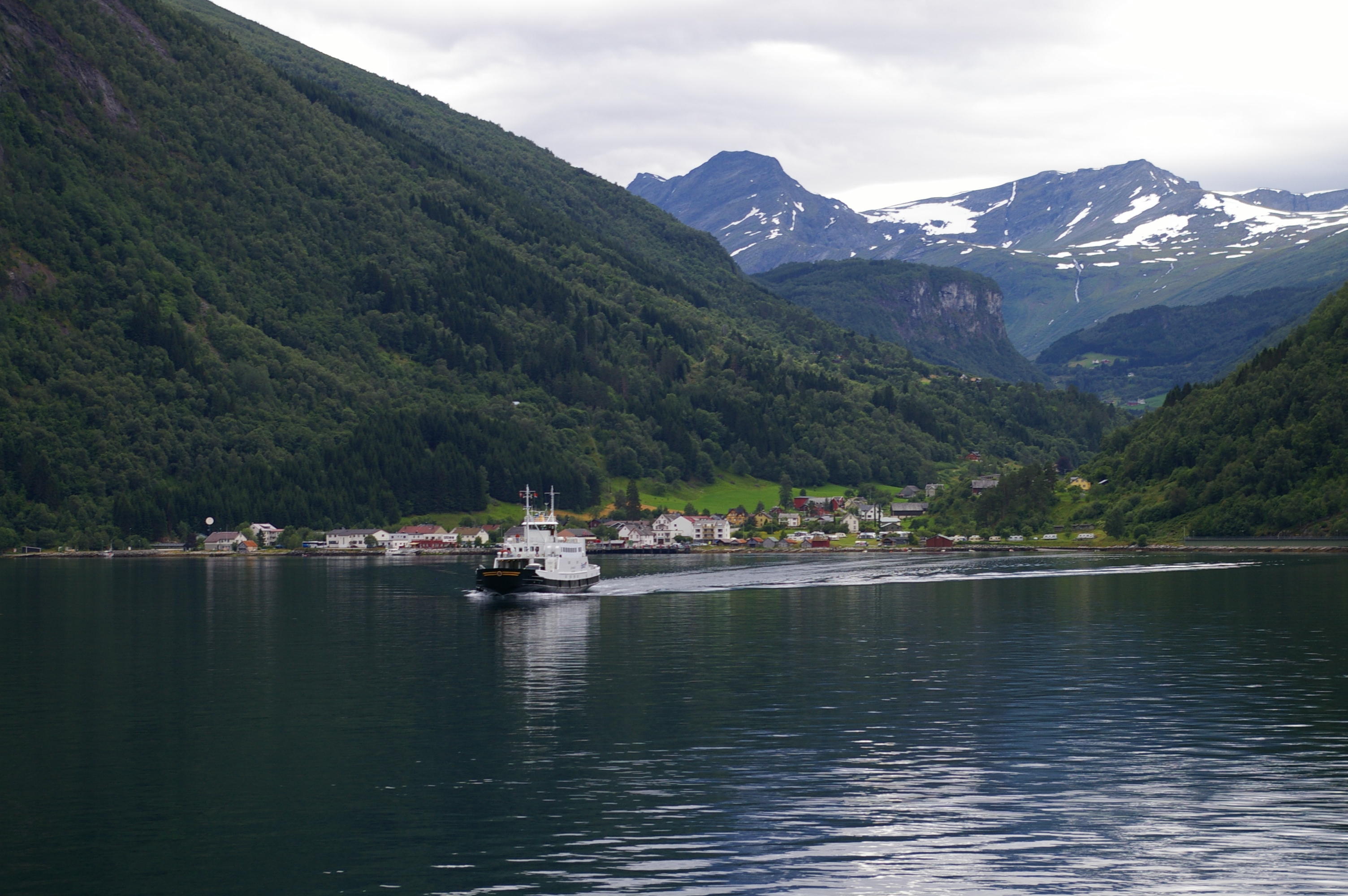
- View of Eidsdal

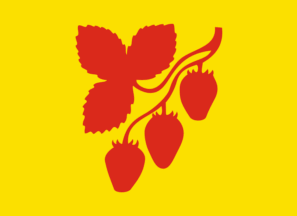
- Flag Coat of arms

- Møre og Romsdal within Norway

- Norddal within Møre og Romsdal
- Coordinates: 62°17′32″N 07°26′18″E
- Country: Norway
- County: Møre og Romsdal
- District: Sunnmøre
- Established: 1 Jan 1838
  - Created as: Formannskapsdistrikt
- Disestablished: 1 Jan 2020
  - Succeeded by: Fjord Municipality
- Administrative centre: Sylte

Government
  - Mayor (2015-2019): Arne Sandnes (Sp)

Area (upon dissolution)
  - Total: 943.51 km^{2} (364.29 sq mi)
  - Land: 900.43 km^{2} (347.66 sq mi)
  - Water: 43.08 km^{2} (16.63 sq mi) 4.6%
  - Rank: #116 in Norway
- Highest elevation: 1,999.2 m (6,559 ft)

Population (2019)
  - Total: 1,645
  - Rank: #345 in Norway
  - Density: 1.7/km^{2} (4.4/sq mi)
  - Change (10 years): ▼ −7%
- Demonym: Norddaling

Official language
  - Norwegian form: Nynorsk
- Time zone: UTC+01:00 (CET)
  - Summer (DST): UTC+02:00 (CEST)
- ISO 3166 code: NO-1524

Norddal is a former municipality in Møre og Romsdal county, Norway. The 943.5-square-kilometre (364.3 sq mi) municipality existed from 1838 until its dissolution in 2020. The area is now part of Fjord Municipality in the traditional district of Sunnmøre. The administrative centre was the village of Sylte (also known as Valldal) in the Valldalen valley.

Norddal Municipality was the easternmost part of the Sunnmøre region along the border with Oppland county. Norddal covered an area with several distinct valleys and villages: Eidsdal and Norddal (Dalsbygda) in the south; Tafjord in the east; and Fjørå/Selboskarbygda and Sylte in the Valldalen valley in the north. Norwegian County Road 63 traverses the municipality from south to north, going through several tunnels in the mountains including the Stordal Tunnel. The Heggur Tunnel connects the isolated village of Tafjord with the rest of the municipality.

Prior to its dissolution in 2020, the 943.5-square-kilometre (364.3 sq mi) municipality was the 116th largest by area out of the 422 municipalities in Norway. Norddal Municipality was the 345th most populous municipality in Norway with a population of about 1,645. The municipality's population density was 1.7 inhabitants per square kilometre (4.4/sq mi) and its population had decreased by 7% over the previous 10-year period.

== General information ==
The parish of Norddal was established as a municipality on 1 January 1838 (see formannskapsdistrikt law). Historically, the district of Sunnylven was part of the parish of Norddal, but on 1 January 1838 when Norddal Municipality was established, Sunnylven Municipality was established as its own municipality, separate from Norddal. The municipal borders did not change after that time.

On 1 January 2020, Norddal Municipality (population: 1,670) and Stordal Municipality (population: 972) were merged to form the new Fjord Municipality.

=== Name ===
The municipality (originally the parish) is named after the old Dale farm (Old Norse: Dalr) since the first Dale Church was built there. Historically, the parish was known as simply as Dale. Around the year 1600, the first element, nord, was added. This prefix means "northern". The last element of the name is dalr which means "valley" or "dale". Historically, the name of the municipality was spelled Norddalen. On 3 November 1917, a royal resolution changed the spelling of the name of the municipality to Norddal, removing the definite form ending -en.

=== Coat of arms ===
The coat of arms was granted on 16 February 1990 and they were in use until the municipality was dissolved on 1 January 2020. The official blazon is "Or, a strawberry branch gules" (Norwegian: På gull grunn ein raud jordbærstengel). This means the arms have a field (background) has a tincture of Or which means it is commonly colored yellow, but if it is made out of metal, then gold is used. The charge is a red strawberry branch with a three-part leaf and three berries. This design was chosen because Norddal has a tradition for producing fruits such as apples, pears, and berries, notably strawberries. Wild strawberries can be found growing all over the municipality. The arms were designed by Astor Furseth. The municipal flag has the same design as the coat of arms.

=== Churches ===
The Church of Norway had one parish (sokn) within Norddal Municipality. It was part of the Austre Sunnmøre prosti (deanery) in the Diocese of Møre.

Churches in Norddal Municipality
Parish (sokn)	Church name	Location of the church	Year built
Norddal	Norddal Church	Norddal	1782
Norddal	Sylte Church	Sylte	1863

== History ==
Valldal is mentioned in the historical books of Snorri Sturluson. While escaping the Danish army, Olav Haraldsson, later to become St. Olav, went ashore in Valldalen during the winter 1028/1029. Here, he supposedly came across a troublesome "sea serpent" which he tossed onto the mountainside and can today be seen as a lighter rock pattern above the municipal centre Sylte. On his journey up the valley towards Trollstigen, he received help from the farmers at Grønning to pass a rocky section called Skjærsura. For this help he deemed that the seed crop would never suffer from frost. Also, a natural spring in Valldal is named after St. Olav and is said to have a healing effect.

In 2008, a memorial stone was erected at the farm Døving, about 3 kilometres (1.9 mi) up the valley from the sea, where the first church and cemetery is believed to have been located.

== Government ==
While it existed, Norddal Municipality was responsible for primary education (through 10th grade), outpatient health services, senior citizen services, welfare and other social services, zoning, economic development, and municipal roads and utilities. The municipality was governed by a municipal council of directly elected representatives. The mayor was indirectly elected by a vote of the municipal council. The municipality was under the jurisdiction of the Sunnmøre District Court and the Frostating Court of Appeal.

=== Municipal council ===
The municipal council (Kommunestyre) of Norddal Municipality was made up of 17 representatives that were elected to four year terms. The tables below show the historical composition of the council by political party.

Norddal kommunestyre 2015–2019
Party name (in Nynorsk)	Number of representatives
Labour Party (Arbeidarpartiet)	2
Centre Party (Senterpartiet)	9
Socialist Left Party (Sosialistisk Venstreparti)	1
Cross-party list for Norddal (Tverrpolitisk liste for Norddal)	5
Total number of members:	17

Norddal kommunestyre 2011–2015
Party name (in Nynorsk)	Number of representatives
Labour Party (Arbeidarpartiet)	6
Progress Party (Framstegspartiet)	1
Centre Party (Senterpartiet)	3
Cross-party list for Norddal (Tverpolitisk liste for Norddal)	4
Norddal List (Norddalslista)	7
Total number of members:	21

Norddal kommunestyre 2007–2011
Party name (in Nynorsk)	Number of representatives
Labour Party (Arbeidarpartiet)	4
Progress Party (Framstegspartiet)	2
Centre Party (Senterpartiet)	5
Cross-party list for Norddal (Tverpolitisk liste for Norddal)	3
Norddal List (Norddalslista)	7
Total number of members:	21

Norddal kommunestyre 2003–2007
Party name (in Nynorsk)	Number of representatives
Labour Party (Arbeidarpartiet)	2
Progress Party (Framstegspartiet)	3
Conservative Party (Høgre)	1
Christian Democratic Party (Kristeleg Folkeparti)	2
Centre Party (Senterpartiet)	6
Socialist Left Party (Sosialistisk Venstreparti)	1
Action List for Norddal (Aksjonslista for Norddal)	4
Norddal List (Norddalslista)	2
Total number of members:	21

Norddal kommunestyre 1999–2003
Party name (in Nynorsk)	Number of representatives
Labour Party (Arbeidarpartiet)	4
Progress Party (Framstegspartiet)	1
Conservative Party (Høgre)	1
Christian Democratic Party (Kristeleg Folkeparti)	3
Centre Party (Senterpartiet)	9
Socialist Left Party (Sosialistisk Venstreparti)	1
Liberal Party (Venstre)	2
Total number of members:	21

Norddal kommunestyre 1995–1999
Party name (in Nynorsk)	Number of representatives
Labour Party (Arbeidarpartiet)	3
Conservative Party (Høgre)	1
Christian Democratic Party (Kristeleg Folkeparti)	3
Centre Party (Senterpartiet)	9
Socialist Left Party (Sosialistisk Venstreparti)	1
Liberal Party (Venstre)	4
Total number of members:	21

Norddal kommunestyre 1991–1995
Party name (in Nynorsk)	Number of representatives
Labour Party (Arbeidarpartiet)	4
Conservative Party (Høgre)	2
Christian Democratic Party (Kristeleg Folkeparti)	3
Centre Party (Senterpartiet)	10
Liberal Party (Venstre)	2
Total number of members:	21

Norddal kommunestyre 1987–1991
Party name (in Nynorsk)	Number of representatives
Labour Party (Arbeidarpartiet)	3
Conservative Party (Høgre)	4
Christian Democratic Party (Kristeleg Folkeparti)	3
Centre Party (Senterpartiet)	9
Liberal Party (Venstre)	2
Total number of members:	21

Norddal kommunestyre 1983–1987
Party name (in Nynorsk)	Number of representatives
Labour Party (Arbeidarpartiet)	3
Conservative Party (Høgre)	4
Christian Democratic Party (Kristeleg Folkeparti)	3
Centre Party (Senterpartiet)	8
Liberal Party (Venstre)	2
Socialist common list (Sosialistisk fellesliste)	1
Total number of members:	21

Norddal kommunestyre 1979–1983
Party name (in Nynorsk)	Number of representatives
Labour Party (Arbeidarpartiet)	2
Conservative Party (Høgre)	3
Christian Democratic Party (Kristeleg Folkeparti)	4
Centre Party (Senterpartiet)	9
Liberal Party (Venstre)	3
Total number of members:	21

Norddal kommunestyre 1975–1979
Party name (in Nynorsk)	Number of representatives
Labour Party (Arbeidarpartiet)	1
Local list for Eidsdal (Bygdeliste for Eidsdal)	6
Local list for Valldal (Bygdeliste for Valldal)	10
Local list for Fjørå (Bygdeliste for Fjørå)	1
Local list for Tafjord (Bygdeliste for Tafjord)	1
Local list for Dalsbygda (Bygdeliste for Dalsbygda)	2
Total number of members:	21

Norddal kommunestyre 1971–1975
Party name (in Nynorsk)	Number of representatives
Labour Party (Arbeidarpartiet)	3
Local List(s) (Lokale lister)	18
Total number of members:	21

Norddal kommunestyre 1969–1971
Party name (in Nynorsk)	Number of representatives
Local List(s) (Lokale lister)	21
Total number of members:	21

Norddal kommunestyre 1963–1967
Party name (in Nynorsk)	Number of representatives
Local List(s) (Lokale lister)	21
Total number of members:	21

Norddal heradsstyre 1959–1963
Party name (in Nynorsk)	Number of representatives
Local List(s) (Lokale lister)	21
Total number of members:	21

Norddal heradsstyre 1955–1959
Party name (in Nynorsk)	Number of representatives
Local List(s) (Lokale lister)	21
Total number of members:	21

Norddal heradsstyre 1951–1955
Party name (in Nynorsk)	Number of representatives
Labour Party (Arbeidarpartiet)	1
Local List(s) (Lokale lister)	19
Total number of members:	20

Norddal heradsstyre 1947–1951
Party name (in Nynorsk)	Number of representatives
Local List(s) (Lokale lister)	20
Total number of members:	20

Norddal heradsstyre 1945–1947
Party name (in Nynorsk)	Number of representatives
Local List(s) (Lokale lister)	20
Total number of members:	20

Norddal heradsstyre 1937–1941*
Party name (in Nynorsk)	Number of representatives
Labour Party (Arbeidarpartiet)	2
Local List(s) (Lokale lister)	18
Total number of members:	20
Note: Due to the German occupation of Norway during World War II, no elections were held for new municipal councils until after the war ended in 1945.

=== Mayors ===
The mayor (Nynorsk: ordførar) of Norddal Municipality was the political leader of the municipality and the chairperson of the municipal council. The following people have held this position:

- 1838–1844: Arne Iversen Grønningsæter
- 1844–1847: Lars Larsen Myren
- 1848–1879: Elias Arnesson Grønningsæter
- 1880–1883: Elias O. Uri
- 1884–1919: Nils E. Grønningsæter
- 1920–1928: Gerhard Grønningsæter
- 1929–1934: Nils J. Linge
- 1935–1941: Gerhard Grønningsæter
- 1941–1942: Elias Øien (NS)
- 1942–1945: Ole K. Løvoll (NS)
- 1945–1945: Gerhard Grønningsæter
- 1946–1947: Elias Øien
- 1948–1955: Karl Linge
- 1956–1959: Nils P. Linge
- 1960–1963: Elias Lingås
- 1964–1967: Magnus Berdal
- 1967–1967: Karl A. Døving
- 1968–1971: Kåre Nerhagen
- 1972–1973: Ragnar Lødøen
- 1974–1975: Per Berge
- 1976–1987: Karl A. Døving (Sp)
- 1988–1993: Arne Sandnes (Sp)
- 1994–1999: Gudmund Relling (V)
- 1999–2007: Arne Sandnes (Sp)
- 2007–2015: Bjørn Inge Ruset (Ap)
- 2015–2019: Arne Sandnes (Sp)

== Geography ==
The municipality was located around the Norddalsfjorden and the Tafjorden which flow west to east. They are the innermost branches off the main Storfjorden. Stranda Municipality was located to the west and south, Skjåk Municipality was to the southeast, Rauma Municipality was to the east and north, and Stordal Municipality was to the northwest.

The main Valldalen valley runs to the northeast from the fjord. The valleys are surrounded by the Tafjordfjella mountain range. The mountains Puttegga, Karitinden, and Tordsnose sat on the eastern border of the municipality. The mountain Høgstolen was in the northern part of the municipality. Reinheimen National Park was located partially in the municipality of Norddal. The highest point in the municipality was the 1,999-metre (6,558 ft) tall mountain Puttegga, located along the border with Rauma Municipality.

== See also ==
- List of former municipalities of Norway
