= Norddal =

Norddal may refer to:

== Places ==
- Norddal (village), a village in Fjord Municipality in Møre og Romsdal county, Norway
- Norddal Municipality, a former municipality in Møre og Romsdal county, Norway
- Norddal Church, a church in Fjord Municipality in Møre og Romsdal county, Norway
- Norddal, Vestland, a village in Gulen Municipality in Vestland county, Norway

== See also ==
- Nordal
