= Norwegian County Road 63 =

Road in Norway

County Road 63
- Bokmål: Fylkesvei 63; Nynorsk: Fylkesveg 63

Route information
- Length: 103.6 km (64.4 mi)

Major junctions
- South end: Fv15 in Skjåk Municipality
- Road up to Dalsnibba; Fv60 Ferry to Hellesylt; Geiranger village Ørnevegan; Oppskreds Tunnel; Eidsdal village Fv91 →Norddal; Ferry to Linge over the Norddalsfjorden; Fv650 ←Sjøholt; Ferry to Geiranger; Fv92 →Tafjord; Sylte village Fv95 →Døving; Fv95 →Døving; Trollstigen; Fv174 ←Veblungsnes
- North end: E136 in Rauma Municipality

Location
- Country: Norway
- Counties: Møre og Romsdal, Innlandet
- Major cities: Geiranger, Eidsdal, Sylte

Highway system
- Roads in Norway; National Roads; County Roads
← Fv62	→ Fv64

Norwegian County Road 63 (Norwegian: Fylkesvei 63 or Fv63) is a Norwegian county road in Møre og Romsdal county and a very small part in Innlandet county, Norway. It begins at Norwegian National Road 15 along the lake Langvatnet in Skjåk Municipality in Innlandet county and it heads north where it ends at the junction with the European route E136 highway near the town of Åndalsnes in Rauma Municipality, Møre og Romsdal county. The route runs for 103.6 kilometres (64.4 mi) including a single ferry crossing over the Norddalsfjorden. The vast majority of the road is in Møre og Romsdal county, only the southernmost 2.5 kilometres (1.6 mi) lie in the extreme western part of Innlandet county. Both the Langvatnet–Geiranger and Trollstigen sections of the road are closed during winter and spring (usually early November to late May) due to the weather conditions (snow and avalanches). The road passes by a number of notable landmarks, which has led to the earmarking of the route as national tourist route.

== Path (from south to north) ==
From Langvatnet in the south the road passes the lake of Djupvatnet. From here, the mountain of Dalsnibba can be approached via a minor road. The road descends through a series of hairpin turns northwards towards the village of Geiranger, offering views of the Geirangerfjord in the process. From Geiranger, the road ascends the mountainside through another series of hairpin turns; this section of road is known as the Ørnevegen ("Eagle Road") and reaches a height of 620 metres (2,030 ft) above sea level.

At Eidsdal, a ferry is required in order to cross the Norddalsfjorden. The ferry connects Eidsdal with Linge, from where the road passes through a number of small settlements, including Sylte, before running through the valleys of Valldalen and Meiadalen.

The northernmost section of the road includes the Trollstigen ("The Troll Footpath"), a further series of hairpin turns which descend a particularly steep mountain. From the Trollstigen the road runs in an approximate north-west direction before terminating at the junction with the E136 highway near Åndalsnes.

=== Diagram ===
Skjåk Municipality, Innlandet county

- Fv15 ←Stryn, →Bismo
- Langvatnet — Road closure point in the winter

Stranda Municipality, Møre og Romsdal county

- Djupvatnet, highest point on the road (1,038 metres or 3,406 feet)
- Geirangervegen (hairpin road)
- Djupvasshytta; road up to Dalsnibba
- Kvandall Bridge
- Opplenskedalen — Road closure point in the winter
- Hole Bridge
- Flå Bridge
- Fv60 Ferry from Geiranger til Hellesylt (May 1 to September 30, 8 trips per day)
- Geiranger village
- Ørnevegen hairpin turns
- Oppskreds Tunnel (600 metres or 2,000 feet)

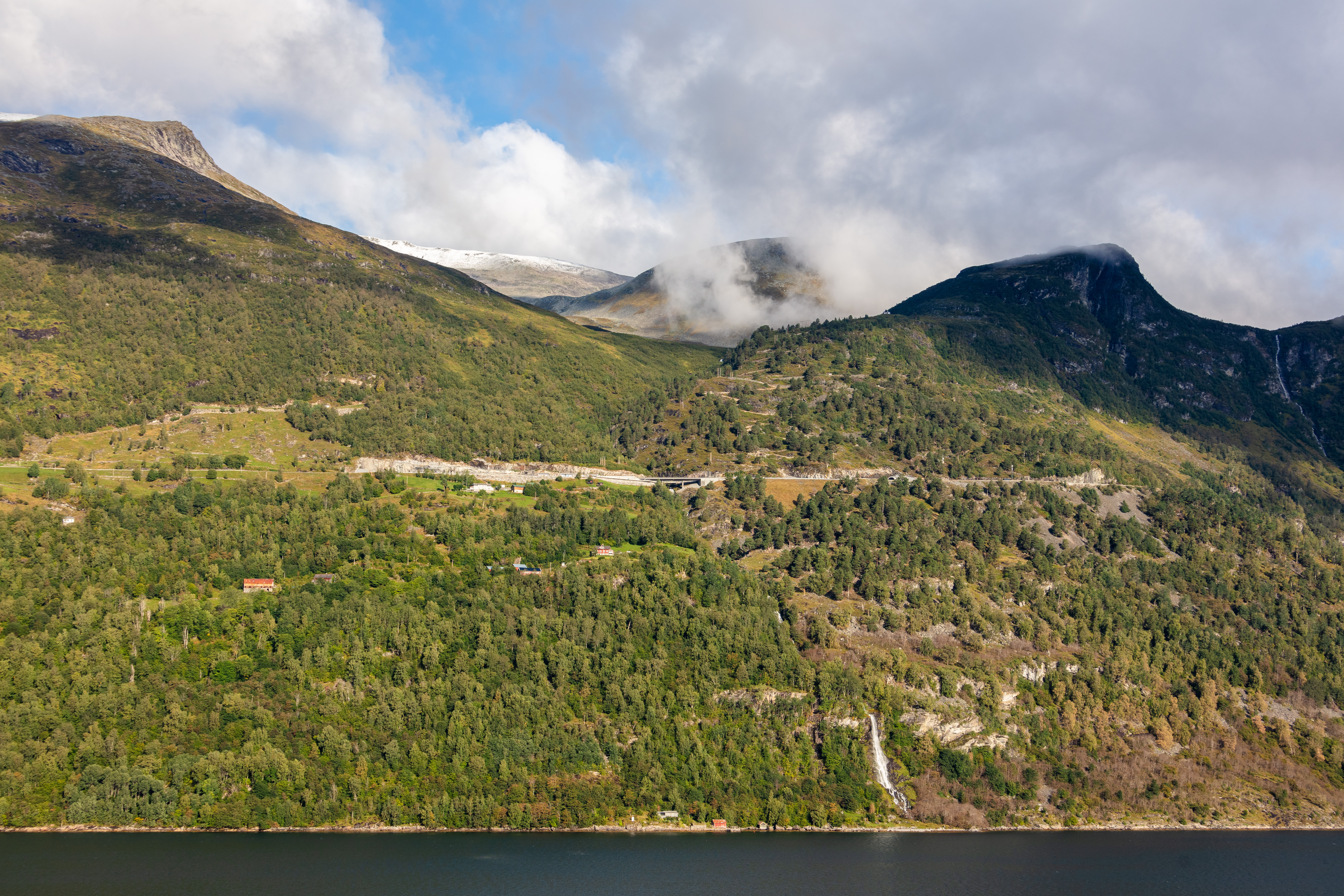
Road nearby Geiranger

Fjord Municipality

- Eidsdalselva Bridge
- Eidsdal village
- Fv91 →Norddal
- Ferry from Eidsdal to Linge over the Norddalsfjorden (10 minutes, 3 trips per hour)
- Fv650 ←Sjøholt
- Muri Bridge
- ~~Ferry from Sylte to Geiranger (June 15 until August 15, 2 trips per day)~~ discontinued 2015
- Fv92 →Tafjord
- Sylte village
- Fv95 →Døving
- Uri Bridge
- Hols Bridge
- Fv95 →Døving
- Gudbrandsjuvet Bridge
- Langdalen — Road closure point in the winter

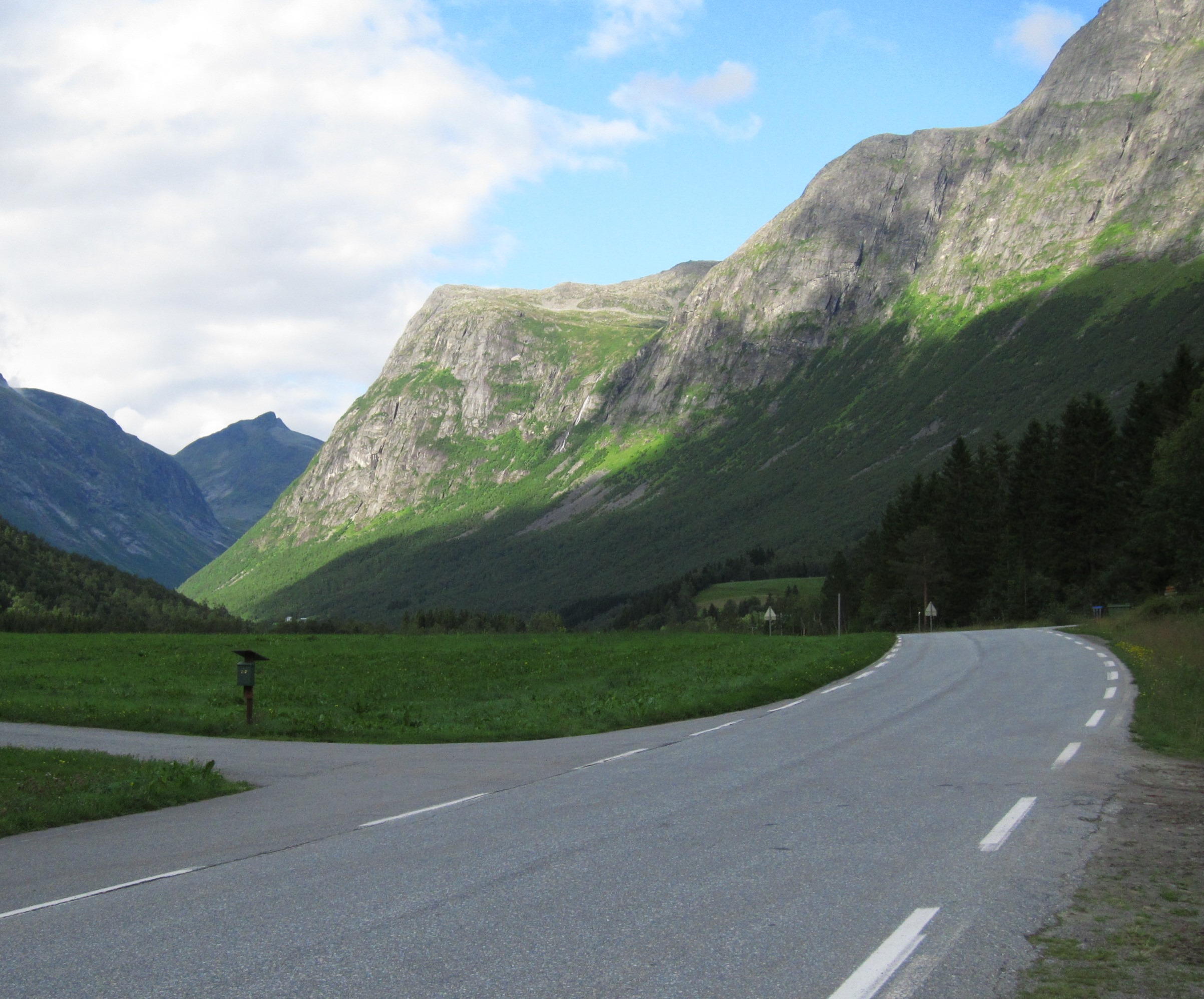
Through Valldal valley near Langdal

Rauma Municipality

- Stigfossen Bridge
- Trollstigen hairpin turns
- Kverna Bridge
- Hanekamhaug — Road closure point in the winter
- Fv174 ←Veblungsnes
- Sogge Bridge
- E136 ←Åndalsnes, →Dombås
