= Sogge =

Sogge is a surname. Notable people with the surname include:

- Christopher D. Sogge (born 1960), American mathematician
- Steve Sogge (born 1947), American football and baseball player

== See also ==
- Sogge Bridge, a truss bridge in Norway
