= Norddal Church =

Church in Møre og Romsdal, Norway

Norddal Church Dale Church
- Norddal kyrkje / Dale kyrkje
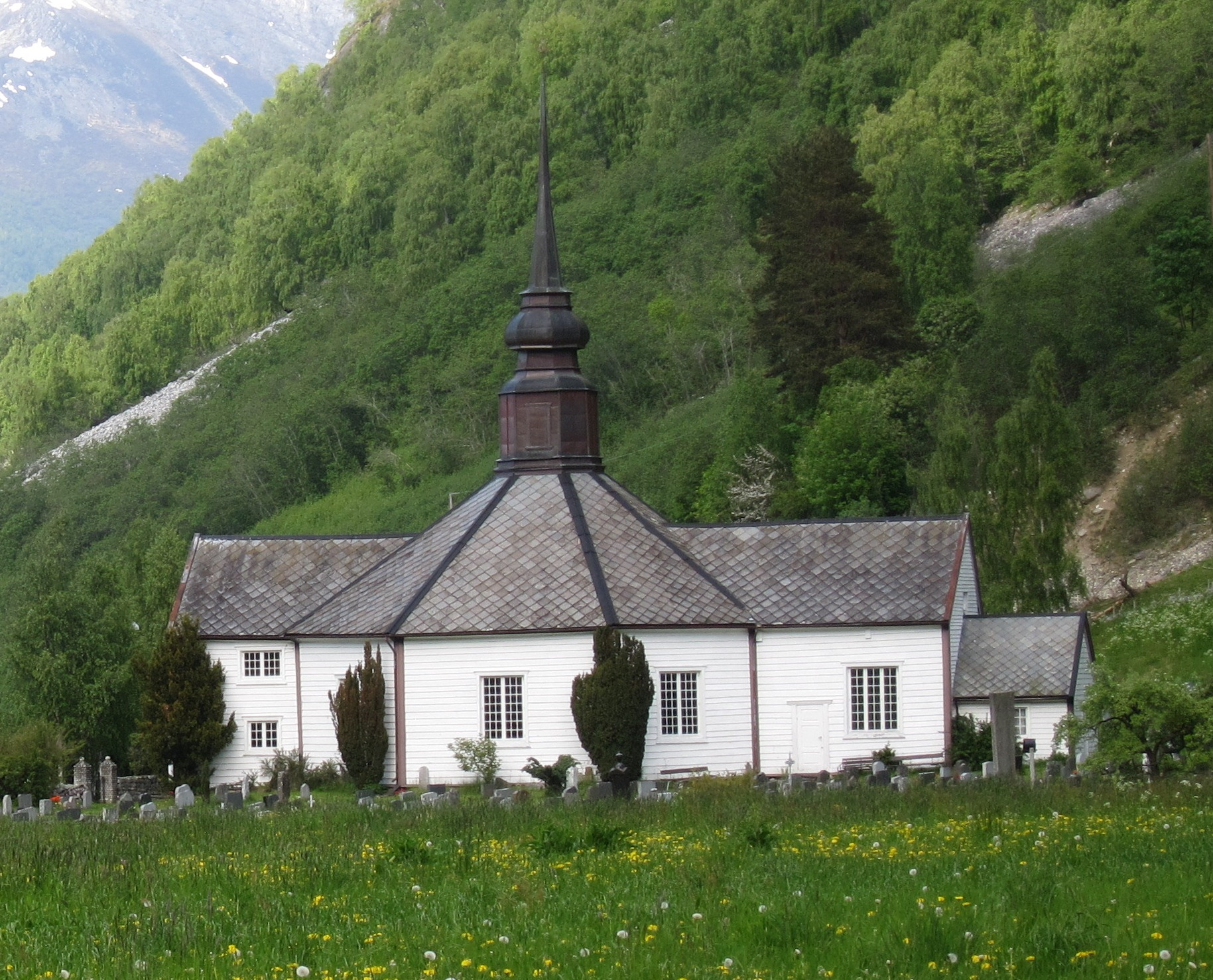
- View of the church
- Norddal Church; Dale Church
- 62.2560024747°N 7.2370156645°E
- Location: Fjord Municipality, Møre og Romsdal
- Country: Norway
- Denomination: Church of Norway
- Churchmanship: Evangelical Lutheran

History
- Status: Parish church
- Founded: 14th century
- Consecrated: 25 July 1784

Architecture
- Functional status: Active
- Architect: Ole Larssen Døving
- Architectural type: Octagonal
- Completed: 1784 (242 years ago)

Specifications
- Capacity: 300
- Materials: Wood

Administration
- Diocese: Møre bispedømme
- Deanery: Nordre Sunnmøre prosti
- Parish: Norddal
- Norwegian Cultural Heritage Site
- Type: Church
- Status: Automatically protected
- ID: 85148

Norddal Church (Norwegian: Norddal kyrkje), also known as Dale Church (Norwegian: Dale kyrkje), is a parish church of the Church of Norway in Norddal Municipality in Møre og Romsdal county, Norway. It is located in the village of Norddal, on the south side of the Norddalsfjorden. It is one of the two churches for the Norddal parish which is part of the Nordre Sunnmøre prosti (deanery) in the Diocese of Møre. The white, wooden church was built in an octagonal style in 1784 using plans drawn up by a local farmer, Ole Larssen Døving. The church seats about 300 people.

== History ==
The earliest existing historical records of the church in Norddal date back to 1432, but the church was already existing on that date. The first church in Norddal was a wooden stave church, possibly built in the 14th century. Not much detail is known about this church building. From 1610 to 1634, a man named Arne Eivindsen was the parish priest for Norddal and during his term as priest, there were two churches in the parish (Sylte Church on the north side of the fjord and Norddal Church on the south side of the fjord). There was also a chapel at Døving, just north of Sylte. He decided to close the Sylte Church since there was a chapel near there already and to make the Norddal Church the main church for the parish. However, the old Norddal Church was not in good condition, so in the early 1620s, the old Norddal church was torn down and the old Sylte Church from the village of Sylte on the north shore of Norddalsfjorden was disassembled and moved across the fjord to the village of Norddal where it was rebuilt as the new Norddal Church. The newly rebuilt church had a cruciform layout and the main nave measured 22.5 by 7.5 metres (74 ft × 25 ft). On the east end of the nave was a choir that measured 8 by 7.5 metres (26 ft × 25 ft). Each of the transverse wings off the nave measured 6 by 5.5 metres (20 ft × 18 ft). In 1686, a new timber-framed choir was added to the east end of the church.

In 1782, the old church was torn down and replaced with a new log building. It was constructed from 1782 to 1784 and it was consecrated on 25 July 1784. The new church had an octagonal layout for the nave. Four columns in the central part of the nave support the eight-sided roof with a tower on top. The church also had a rectangular choir to the east and a two-storey church porch on the west end. Above the center of the nave sits a tower with an onion dome on top. Norddal Church is prototypical for the octagonal churches in Møre og Romsdal county and the Nordfjord district to the south. The altarpiece was taken from the previous church, dates from around 1510, and resembles altarpieces produced by Bernt Notke in Lübeck. There was no professional architect for the church, instead master builder Ole Larsen Døving, a local farmer, designed the church after returning from a trip to Trondheim. The master builder probably used the Trondhjem Hospital Church or possibly Bakke Church as models.

The priest Johan Christopher Haar Daae served at the church from 1804 to 1820.

In 1814, this church served as an election church (Norwegian: valgkirke). Together with more than 300 other parish churches across Norway, it was a polling station for elections to the 1814 Norwegian Constituent Assembly which wrote the Constitution of Norway. This was Norway's first national elections. Each church parish was a constituency that elected people called "electors" who later met together in each county to elect the representatives for the assembly that was to meet at Eidsvoll Manor later that year.

The 40 victims of the 1934 Tafjorden landslide and subsequent tsunami are buried in the church cemetery.

== Media gallery ==
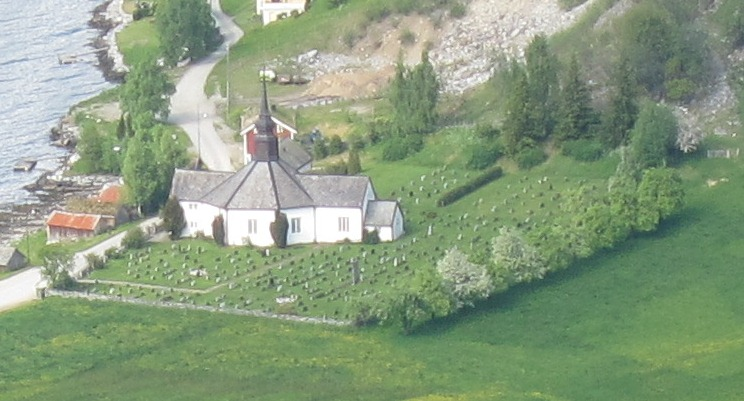

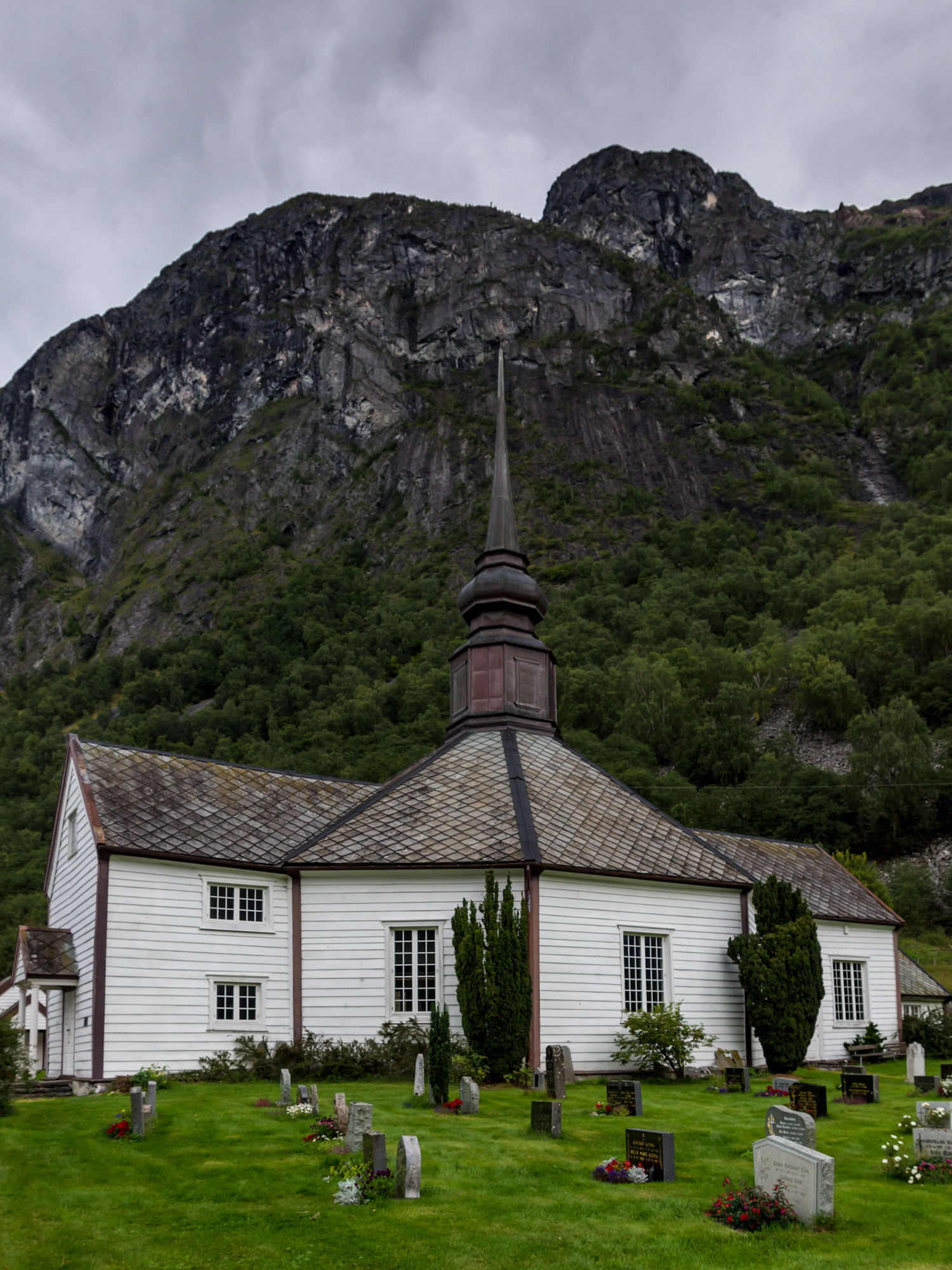

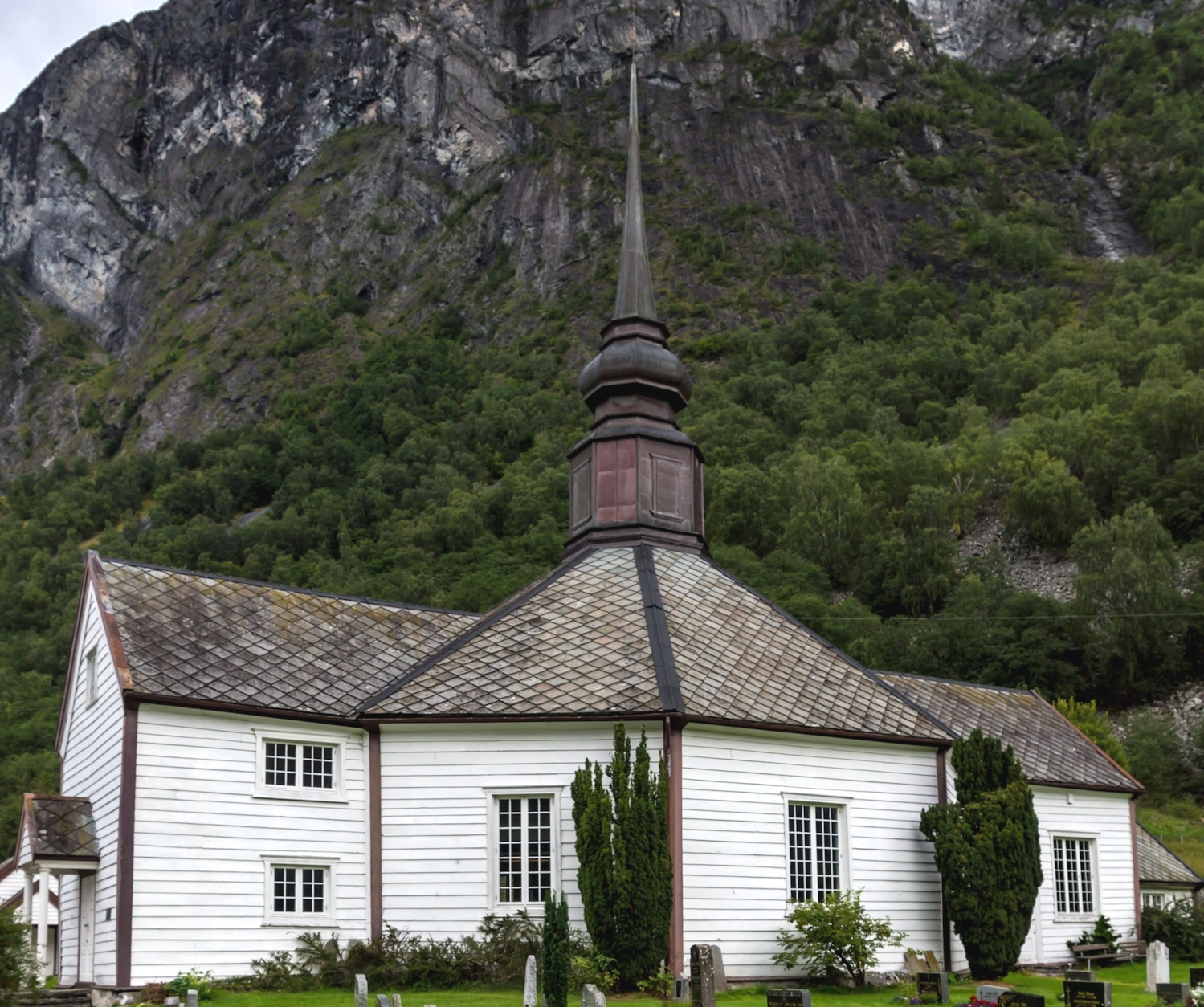

== See also ==
- List of churches in Møre
