= Eidsdal =

Village in Fjord Municipality, Norway

- Village
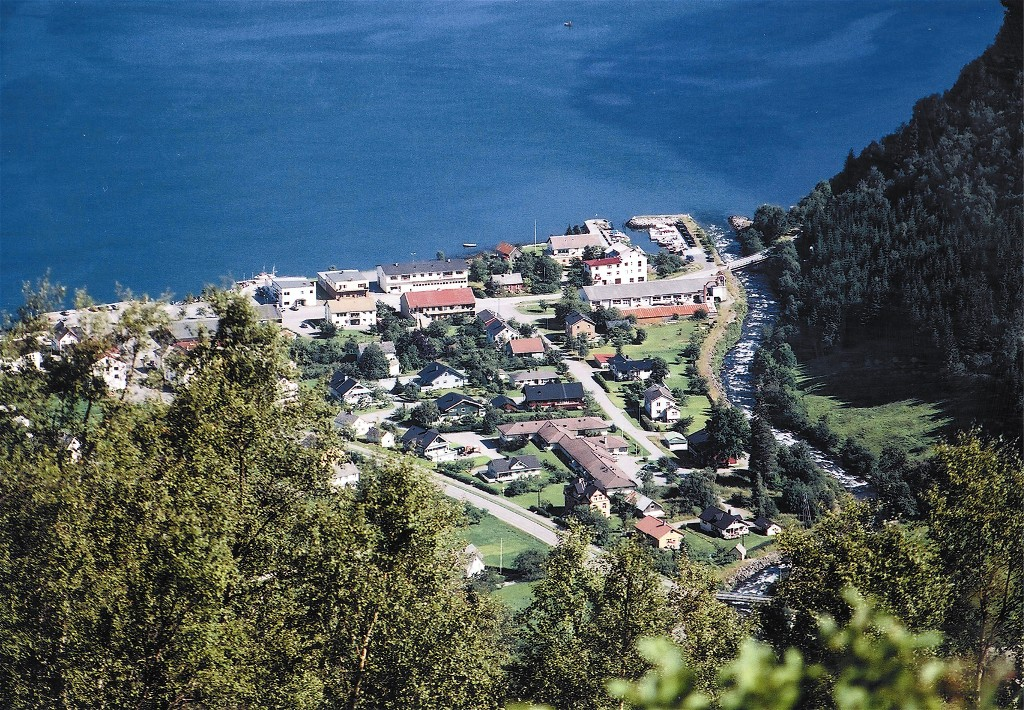
- View of Eidsdal (looking north)
- Interactive map of Eidsdal
- Location within Møre og Romsdal Location within Norway
- Coordinates: 62.2626°N 7.1718°E
- Country: Norway
- Region: Western Norway
- County: Møre og Romsdal
- District: Sunnmøre
- Municipality: Fjord Municipality
- Elevation: 3 m (9.8 ft)
- Time zone: UTC+01:00 (CET)
  - Summer (DST): UTC+02:00 (CEST)
- Post Code: 6215 Eidsdal

Eidsdal is a village and valley in Fjord Municipality in Møre og Romsdal county, Norway. It is located along the south side of the Norddalsfjorden, about 7 kilometres (4.3 mi) southwest of the village of Sylte and about 4 kilometres (2.5 mi) west of the village of Norddal. The local church, Norddal Church is located in the nearby village of Norddal. Eidsdal has approximately 400 inhabitants.

The valley stretches from the Norddalsfjorden up to the lake Eidsvatnet in the direction of Geiranger. Eidsdal is part of "The Golden Route", a well known tourist route that connects Eidsdal and Geiranger with Romsdal and Trollstigen. Norwegian County Road 63 runs north and south through the Eidsdal valley, with a ferry connection to Linge, across the fjord.

Eidsdal is mainly an agricultural village. Most farmers are engaged in milk production with cows and goats. Tourism is the second major economic activity in Eidsdal. There are several campgrounds, cabins, and room rentals. Furthermore, there has been considerable investment in building cabins in recent years.

== Gallery ==
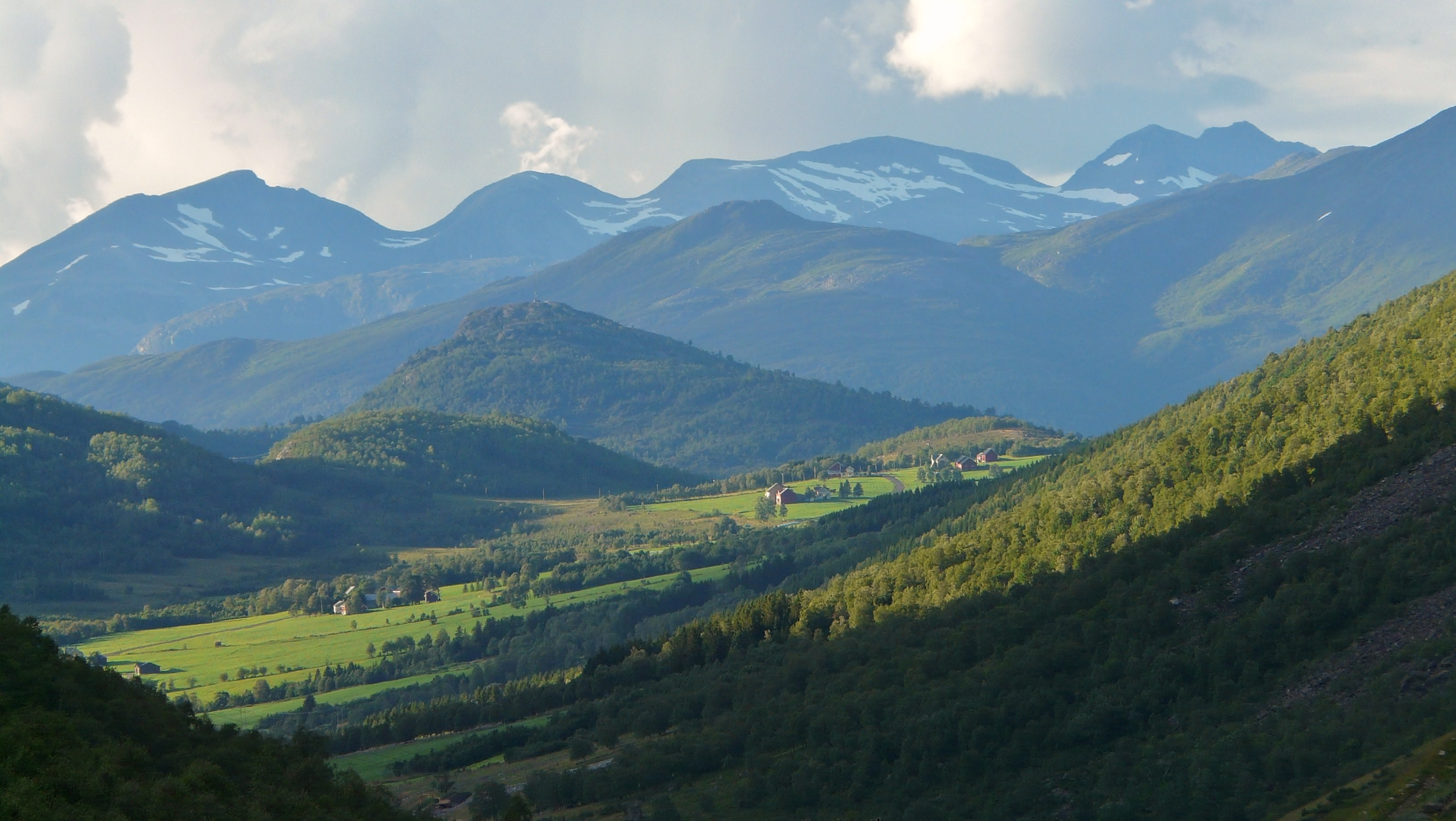
Eidsdalen from a little south from the Oppskredtunnelen

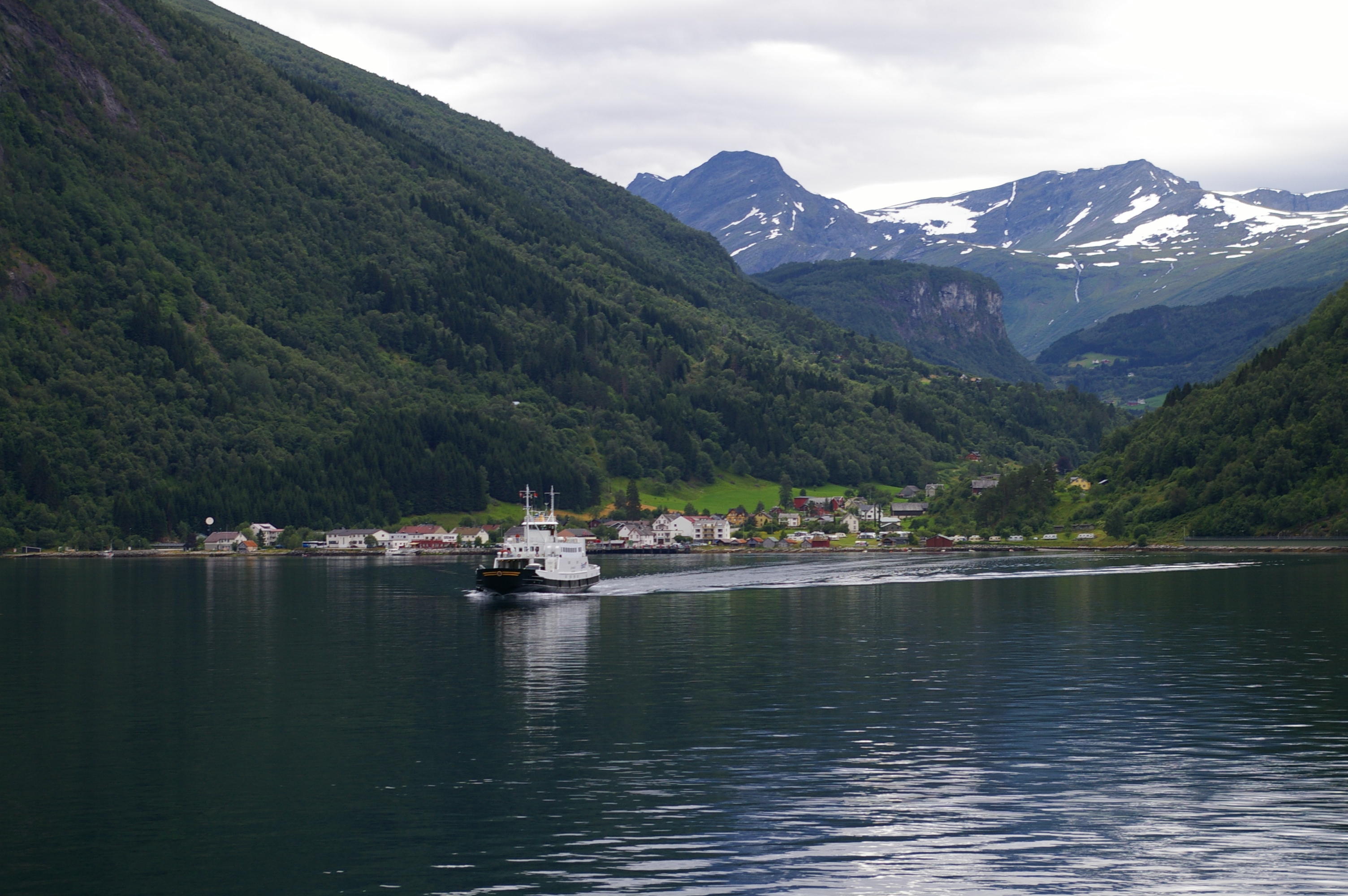

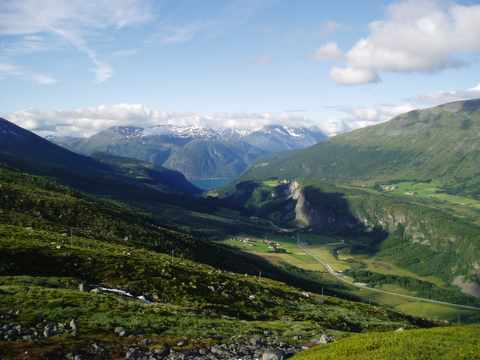

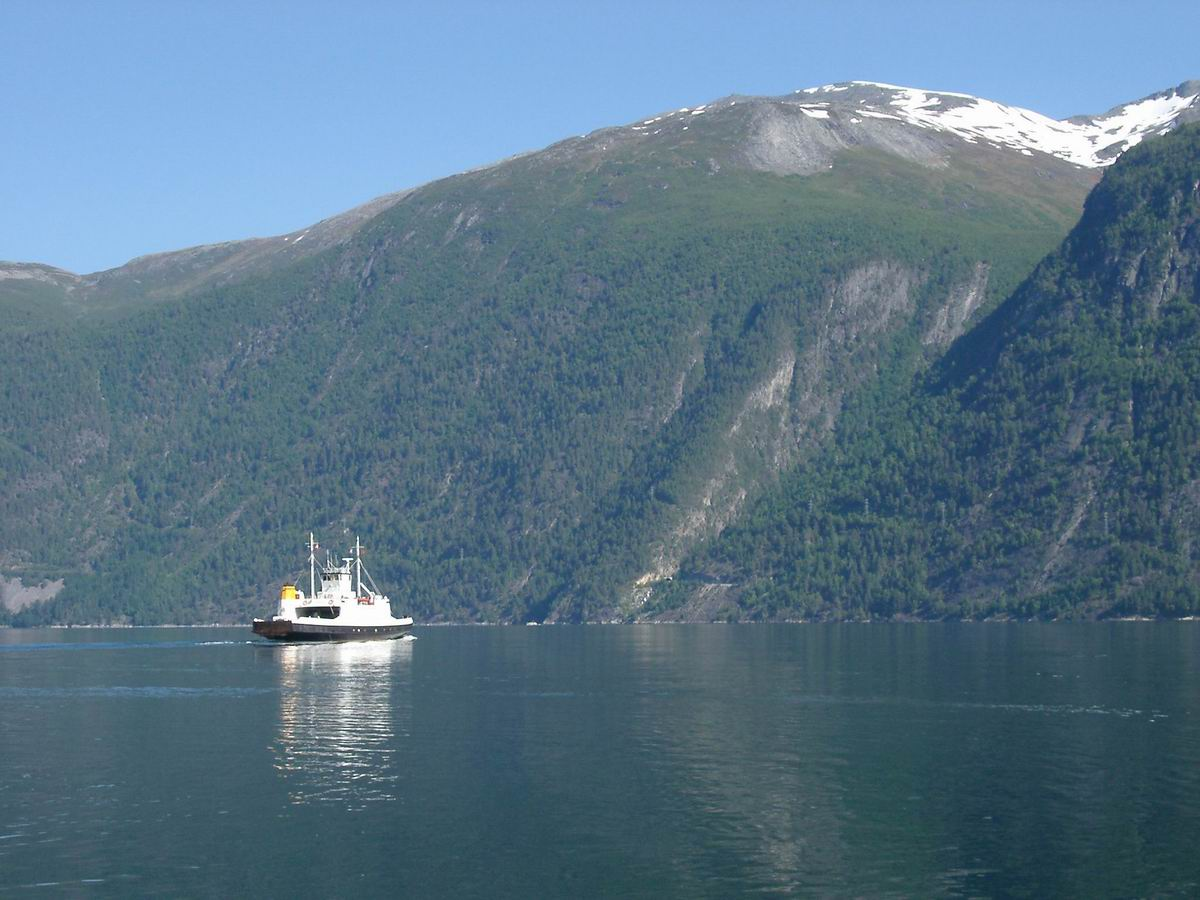
Ferry from Linge to Eidsdal

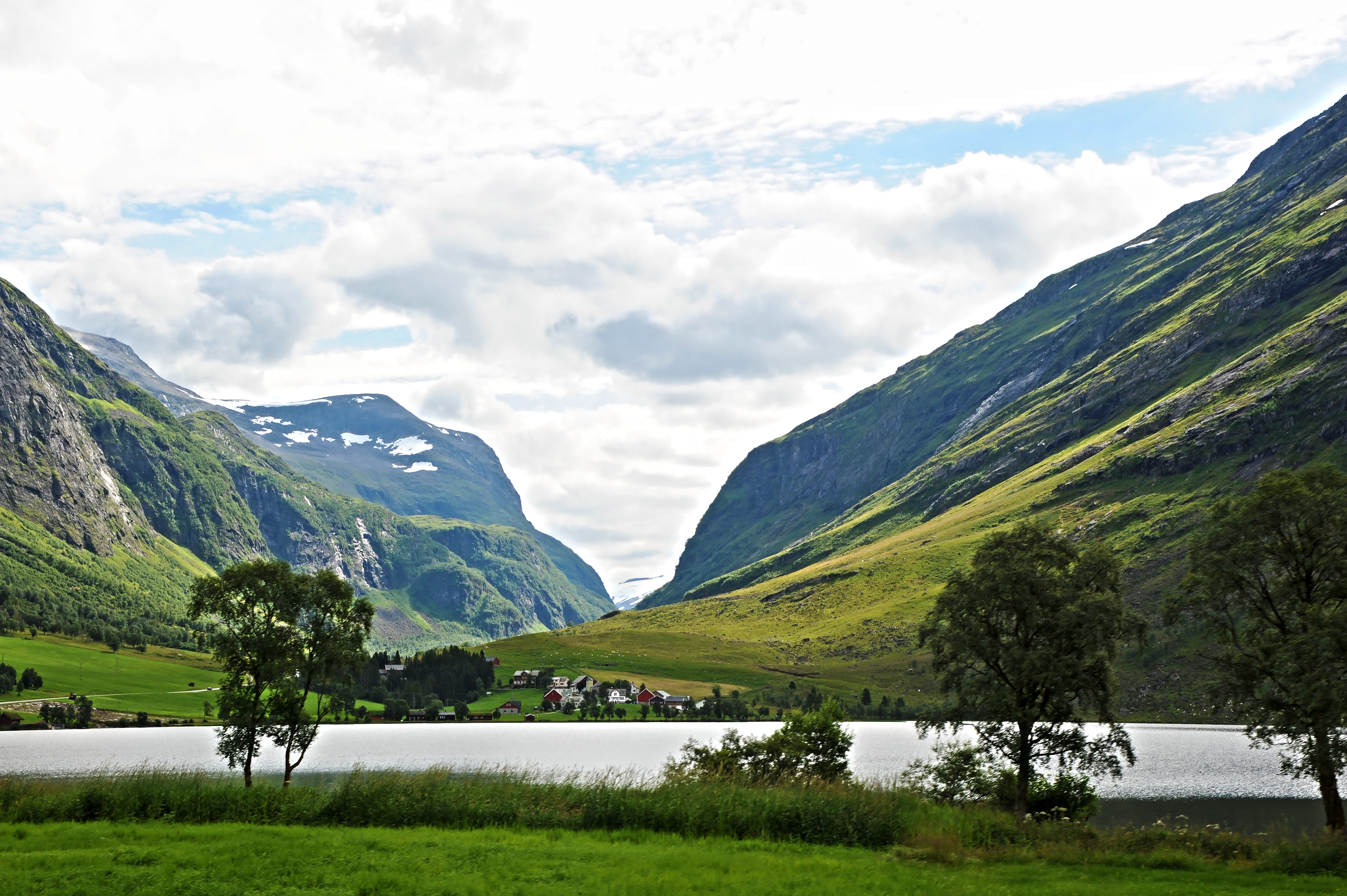
Eidsvatnet
