= Fjord Municipality =

Municipality in Møre og Romsdal, Norway

Fjord Municipality Fjord kommune
- Municipality
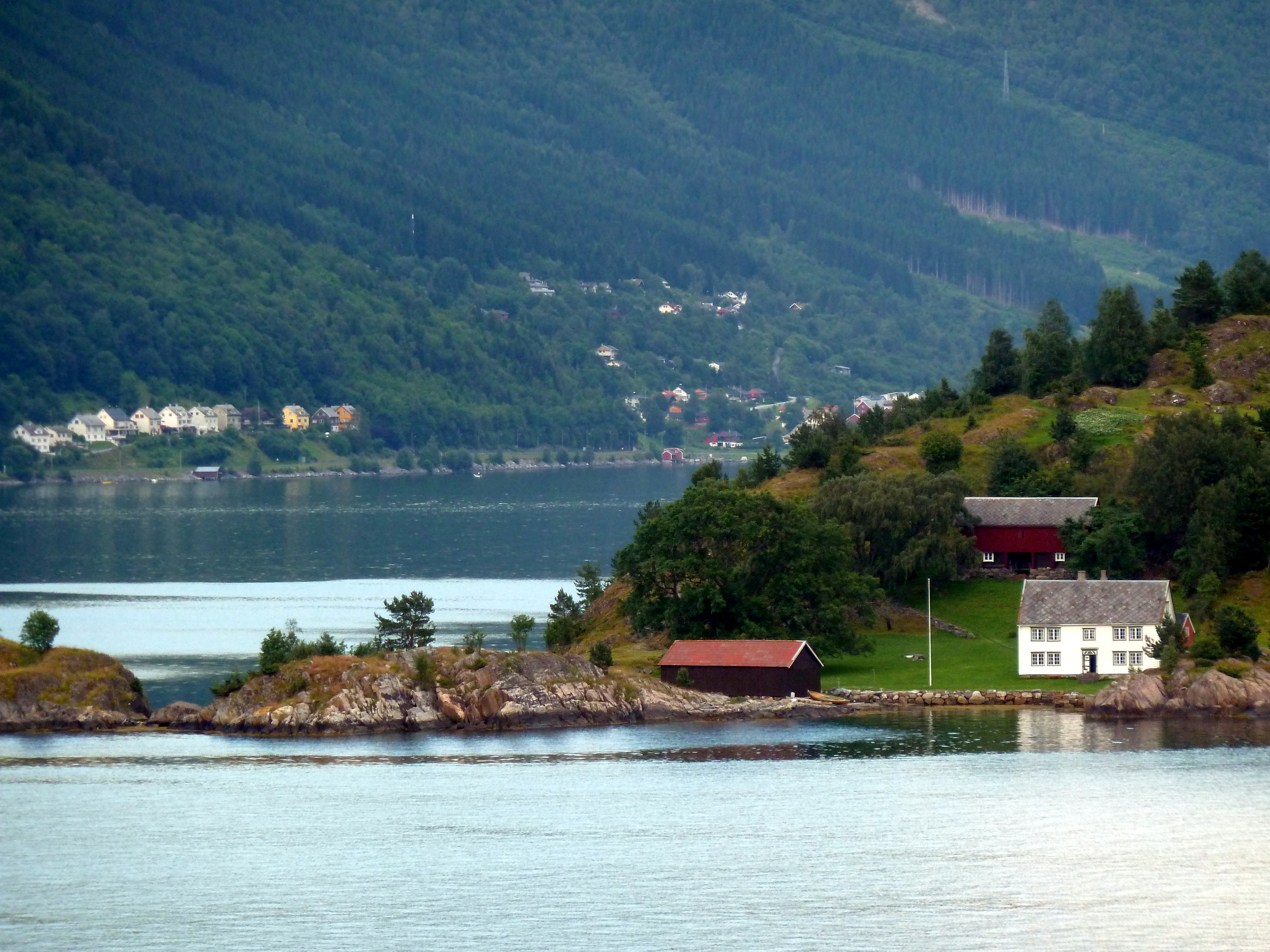
- Stordal

- Coat of arms

- Møre og Romsdal within Norway

- Fjord within Møre og Romsdal
- Coordinates: 62.3037°N 7.2578°E
- Country: Norway
- County: Møre og Romsdal
- District: Sunnmøre
- Established: 1 Jan 2020
  - Preceded by: Stordal Municipality and Norddal Municipality
- Administrative centre: Stordal

Government
  - Mayor (2023): Terese Jemtegård Moen (Sp)

Area
  - Total: 1,190.58 km^{2} (459.69 sq mi)
  - Land: 1,143.93 km^{2} (441.67 sq mi)
  - Water: 46.65 km^{2} (18.01 sq mi) 3.9%
  - Rank: #92 in Norway
- Highest elevation: 1,999.17 m (6,559.0 ft)

Population (2024)
  - Total: 2,492
  - Rank: #255 in Norway
  - Density: 2.1/km^{2} (5.4/sq mi)
  - Change (10 years): ▼ −8.4%
- Demonym: Fjordværing

Official language
  - Norwegian form: Nynorsk
- Time zone: UTC+01:00 (CET)
  - Summer (DST): UTC+02:00 (CEST)
- ISO 3166 code: NO-1578
- Website: Official website

Fjord is a municipality in Møre og Romsdal county, Norway. It is located in the traditional district of Sunnmøre. The administrative centre of the municipality is the village of Stordal. Other villages in the municipality include Valldal, Eidsdal, Norddal, Tafjord, Fjørå/Selboskarbygda, Sylte. The name Fjord is a common word and name part in Norway and was chosen for the new municipality established in 2020 for reasons of search engine optimization, despite not having any historical tradition in the municipality.

The 1,191-square-kilometre (460 sq mi) municipality is the 92nd largest by area out of the 357 municipalities in Norway. Fjord Municipality is the 255th most populous municipality in Norway with a population of 2,492. The municipality's population density is 2.1 inhabitants per square kilometre (5.4/sq mi) and its population has decreased by 8.4% over the previous 10-year period.

== General information ==
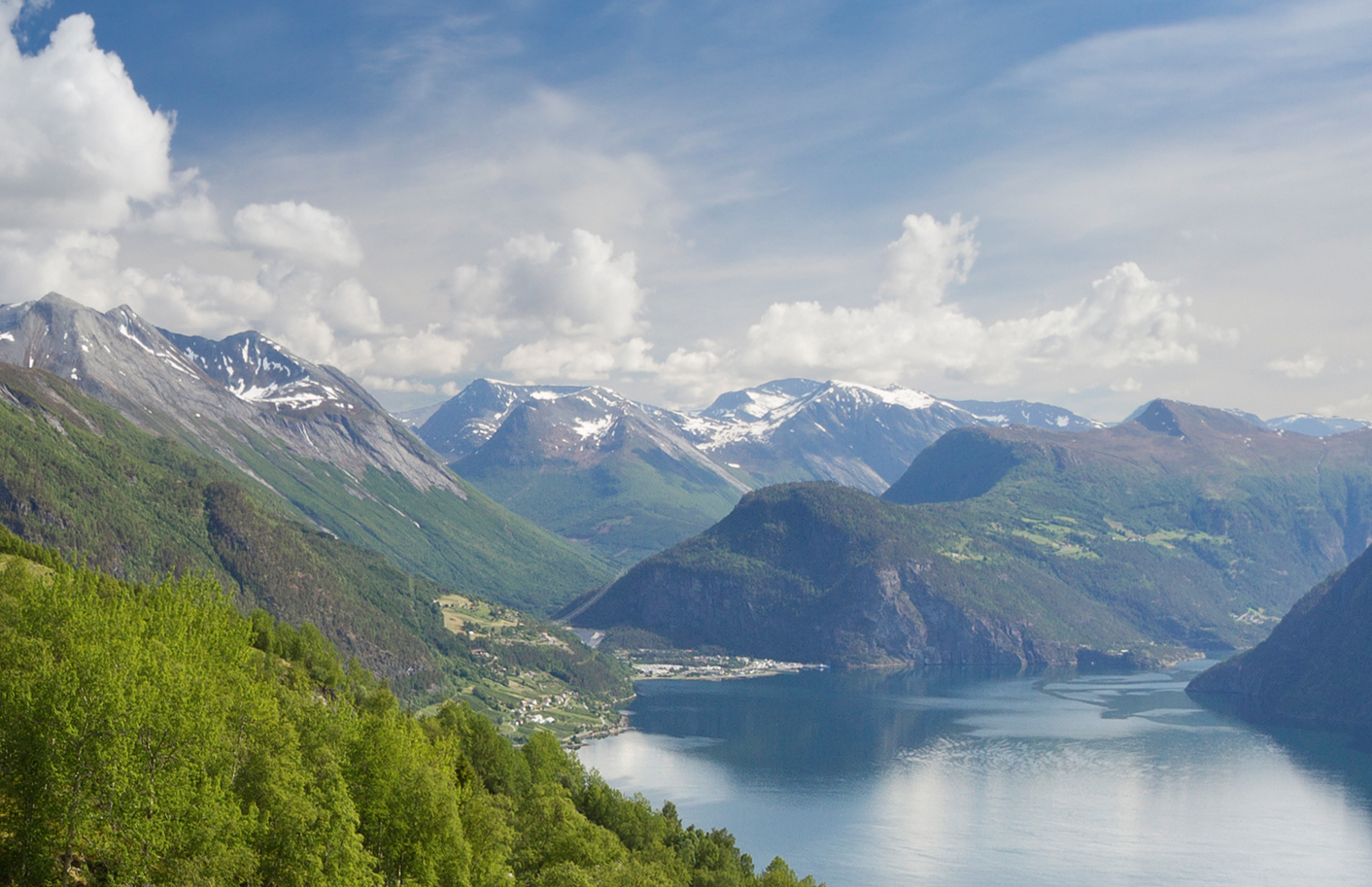
Landscape of Fjord (Norddalsfjord and Valldal)

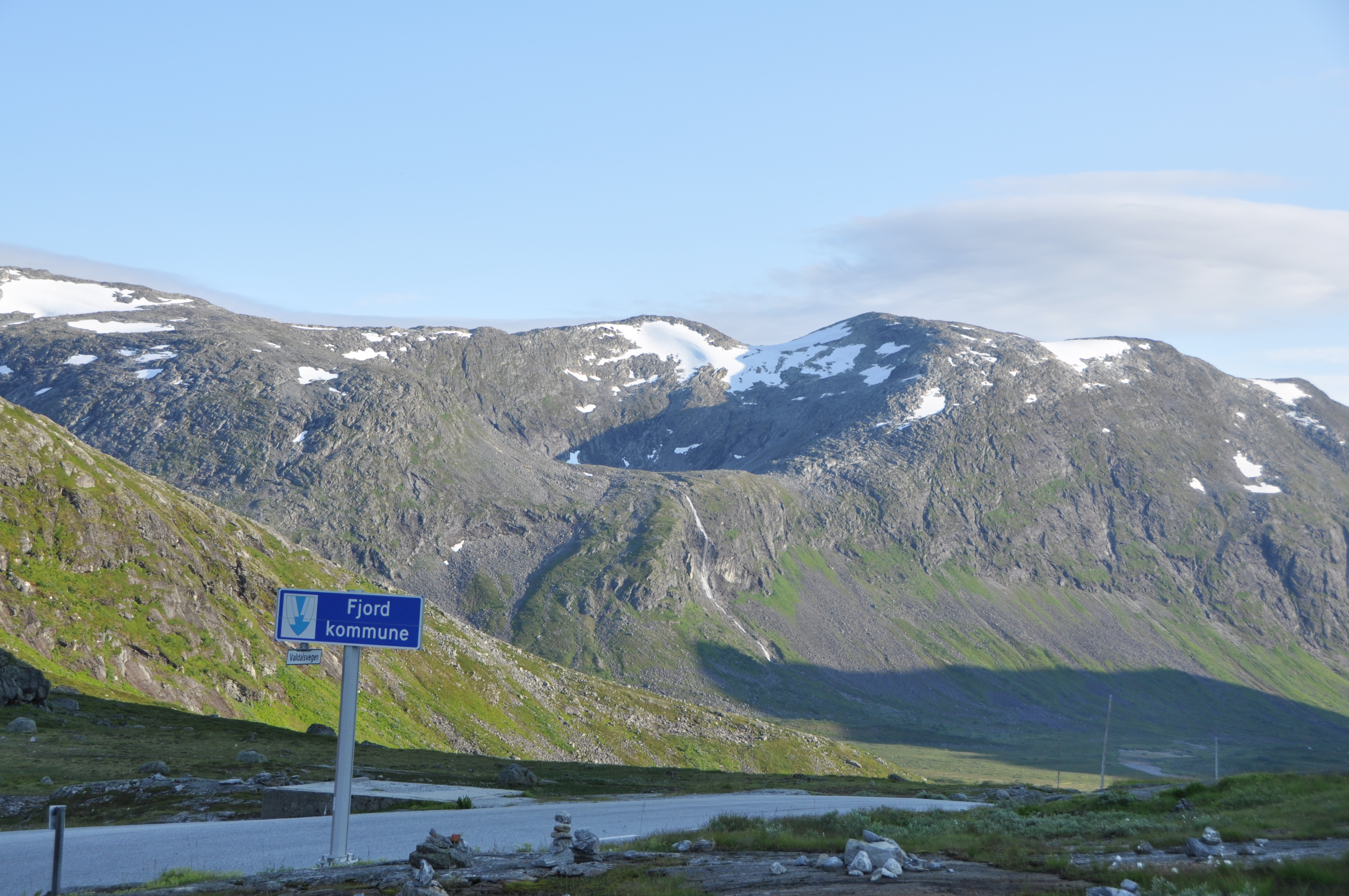
Road leading to Fjord

The municipality was established on 1 January 2020 after the government of Norway approved the merger of Stordal Municipality (population: 972) and Norddal Municipality (population: 1,670). The borders have not changed since that time.

=== Name ===
The municipality was named Fjord to signify its location at the inner part of the Storfjorden. The name Fjord has no historical basis or tradition in the area; according to the municipality, the name was chosen in 2020 because of a desire to optimize search engine results and that it wanted Google results for the common word "fjord" to be dominated by the municipality to attract tourists.

The official Language Council of Norway criticized the name of the municipality and stated that "fjord is a common word that has been appropriated as the name of a municipality, which we opposed." The council also stated that it is an important principle that municipal names should be based on names with a historical tradition in the area, and that "invented names" with no tradition such as Fjord are unfortunate.

=== Coat of arms ===
The coat of arms was granted on 30 October 2019 to be used starting on 1 January 2020 upon the establishment of the new municipality. The arms have a blue field (background) and the charge is four parallelogram shapes on the left and right sides of the escutcheon that extend off the shield. The charge has a tincture of argent which means it is commonly colored white, but if it is made out of metal, then silver is used. The design was chosen to represent the mountains on either side of the Storfjorden which flows through the municipality. The blue color in the field symbolizes the water and sky while the white shapes represent the snowy mountains surrounding the water. The arms were designed by Dag Øistein Endsjø. The municipal flag has the same design as the coat of arms.

=== Churches ===
The Church of Norway has two parishes (sokn) within Fjord Municipality: Stordal in the north and Norddal in the south. The municipality is part of the Nordre Sunnmøre prosti (deanery) in the Diocese of Møre.

Churches in Fjord Municipality
Parish (sokn)	Church name	Location of the church	Year built	Photo
Norddal	Norddal Church	Norddal	1782	
Norddal	Sylte Church	Sylte	1863	
Stordal	Stordal Church	Stordal	1907	
Stordal	Old Stordal Church (Rosekyrkja*)	Stordal	1789	
*Rosekyrkja has been a museum church since 1908.

== Geography ==
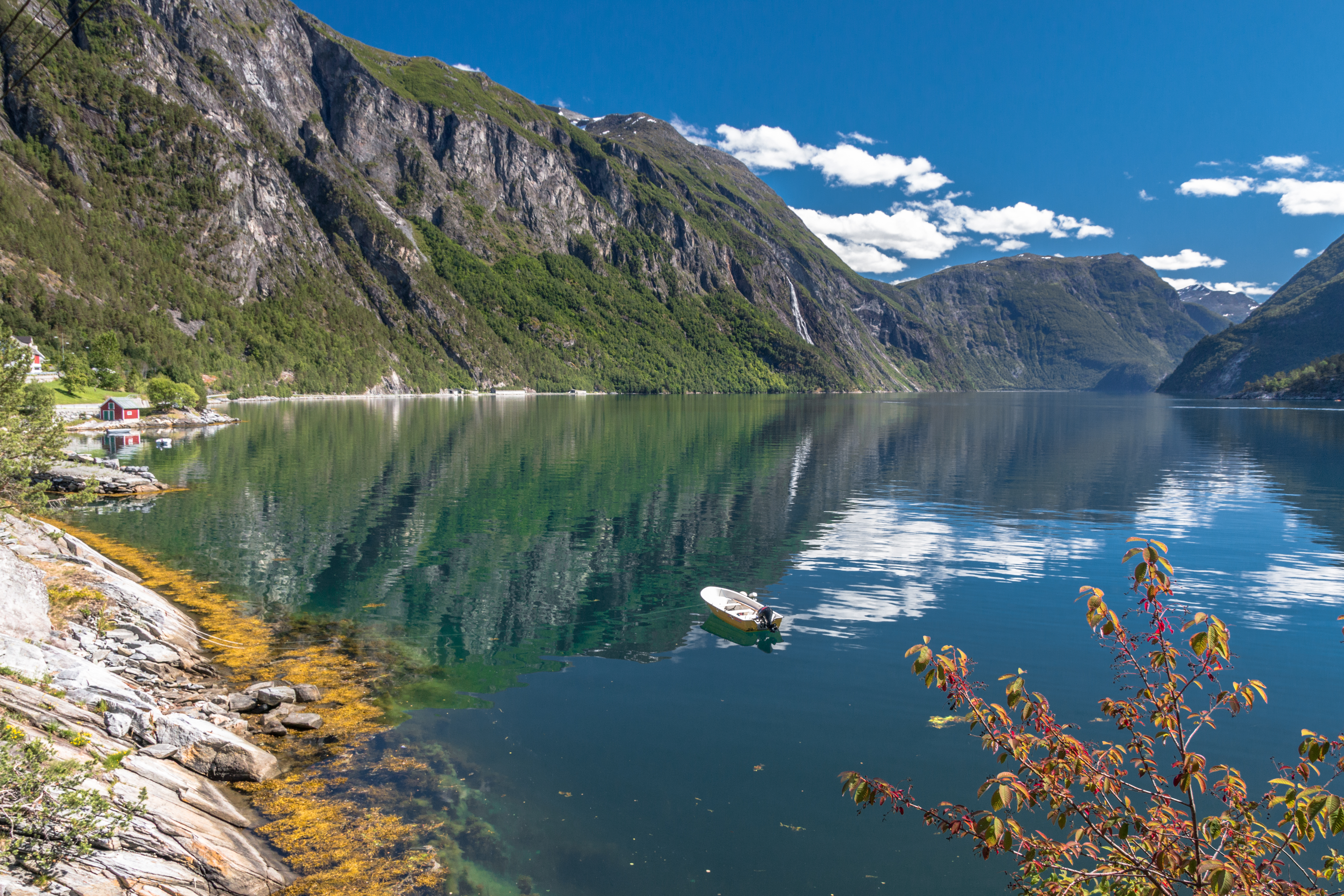
Tafjord

Fjord Municipality is located along the inner Storfjorden and around the Norddalsfjorden and the Tafjorden which flow west to east. The majority of the municipality lies east and south of the fjord, while a small previously inhabited mountainous area on the west side of the fjord is also part of Fjord. Ytste Skotet is a preserved historic farm/museum that is located on the steep mountainsides on the west side of the fjord. Most of the municipality surrounds the Stordalen valley and the Valldalen valley, both on the east side of the fjord. The highest point in the municipality is the 1,999-metre (6,558 ft) tall mountain Puttegga, on the border with Rauma Municipality.

The large Valldalen valley runs to the northeast from the Norddalsfjorden. The valleys are surrounded by the Tafjordfjella mountain range. The mountains Puttegga, Karitinden, and Tordsnose sit on the eastern border of the municipality. The mountain Høgstolen lies in the northern part of the municipality. Reinheimen National Park is located partially in the municipality. Tafjorden is part of the UNESCO World Heritage Site West Norwegian Fjords.

== Climate ==
The Norwegian Meteorological Institute has kept records of the temperature in Tafjord since 1925, documenting a temperate oceanic climate (marine west coast climate; Köppen climate zone: Cfb). The all-time high 33.8 °C or 92.8 °F was recorded July 1945, and the all-time low −16.6 °C or 2.1 °F in January 1942. Tafjord, in a narrow fjord area surrounded by high mountains, often experiences foehn in winter when strong Atlantic lows pushes mild air towards the coast. Tafjord has the national high for November with 21.8 °C or 71.2 °F and the national high for December. The average date for the last overnight freeze (low below 0 °C (32.0 °F)) in spring is 17 April and the average date for the first freeze in autumn is 24 October giving a frost-free season of 189 days (1981–2010 average).

Climate data for Tafjord 1991–2020 (11 m, extremes 1930–2024)
Month	Jan	Feb	Mar	Apr	May	Jun	Jul	Aug	Sep	Oct	Nov	Dec	Year
Record high °C (°F)	18.7 (65.7)	17.1 (62.8)	18.1 (64.6)	21.2 (70.2)	28.7 (83.7)	31.8 (89.2)	33.8 (92.8)	30.6 (87.1)	26.5 (79.7)	25.5 (77.9)	21.8 (71.2)	18.7 (65.7)	33.8 (92.8)
Mean daily maximum °C (°F)	5 (41)	4.5 (40.1)	6.7 (44.1)	11.1 (52.0)	15.2 (59.4)	18 (64)	20 (68)	19.3 (66.7)	15.8 (60.4)	11 (52)	7.8 (46.0)	5.4 (41.7)	11.7 (53.0)
Daily mean °C (°F)	1.9 (35.4)	1.4 (34.5)	3.3 (37.9)	6.7 (44.1)	9.9 (49.8)	12.7 (54.9)	15 (59)	14.6 (58.3)	11.7 (53.1)	7.7 (45.9)	4.8 (40.6)	2.2 (36.0)	7.7 (45.8)
Mean daily minimum °C (°F)	−0.6 (30.9)	−1.1 (30.0)	0.4 (32.7)	3.2 (37.8)	6 (43)	9.1 (48.4)	11.7 (53.1)	11.5 (52.7)	8.5 (47.3)	4.8 (40.6)	2.2 (36.0)	−0.4 (31.3)	4.6 (40.3)
Record low °C (°F)	−16.6 (2.1)	−15.4 (4.3)	−14.1 (6.6)	−7 (19)	−2 (28)	0.6 (33.1)	3.5 (38.3)	2.1 (35.8)	−1.6 (29.1)	−7.7 (18.1)	−10.8 (12.6)	−15 (5)	−16.6 (2.1)
Average precipitation mm (inches)	123.2 (4.85)	99.1 (3.90)	94.1 (3.70)	55.7 (2.19)	44 (1.7)	56.2 (2.21)	55.3 (2.18)	66.7 (2.63)	89.9 (3.54)	99 (3.9)	105.2 (4.14)	123.1 (4.85)	1,011.5 (39.79)
Average precipitation days (≥ 1.0 mm)	13	12	12	9	9	10	11	11	12	12	11	14	136
Source 1: yr.no/eklima (means, precipitation, extremes - data by met.no)
Source 2: NOAA - WMO averages 91-2020 Norway

== Government ==
Fjord Municipality is responsible for primary education (through 10th grade), outpatient health services, senior citizen services, welfare and other social services, zoning, economic development, and municipal roads and utilities. The municipality is governed by a municipal council of directly elected representatives. The mayor is indirectly elected by a vote of the municipal council. The municipality is under the jurisdiction of the Sunnmøre District Court and the Frostating Court of Appeal.

=== Municipal council ===
The municipal council (Kommunestyre) of Fjord Municipality is made up of 19 representatives that are elected to four-year terms. The tables below show the current and historical composition of the council by political party.

Fjord kommunestyre 2023–2027
Party name (in Nynorsk)	Number of representatives
Labour Party (Arbeidarpartiet)	2
Progress Party (Framstegspartiet)	2
Conservative Party (Høgre)	6
Centre Party (Senterpartiet)	7
Socialist Left Party (Sosialistisk Venstreparti)	2
Total number of members:	19

Fjord kommunestyre 2020–2023
Party name (in Nynorsk)	Number of representatives
Labour Party (Arbeidarpartiet)	5
Progress Party (Framstegspartiet)	1
Conservative Party (Høgre)	6
Christian Democratic Party (Kristeleg Folkeparti)	1
Centre Party (Senterpartiet)	8
Socialist Left Party (Sosialistisk Venstreparti)	2
Total number of members:	23

=== Mayors ===
The mayor (Nynorsk: ordførar) of Fjord Municipality is the political leader of the municipality and the chairperson of the municipal council. Here is a list of people who have held this position:

- 2020–2023: Eva Hove (Ap)
- 2023–present: Terese Jemtegård Moen (Sp)

== Notable people ==
- Martin Linge, DSC (1894 in Norddal – 1941), an actor who worked for SOE in WWII
- Marta Schumann (1919 in Valldal – 1994), a novelist, poet, and short story writer
- Almar Heggen (1933 in Norddal – 2014), an opera singer
- Stian Omenås (born 1980 in Valldal), a jazz musician (trumpet), music conductor, and composer
