= Sogge Bridge =

Sogge Bridge Soggebrua
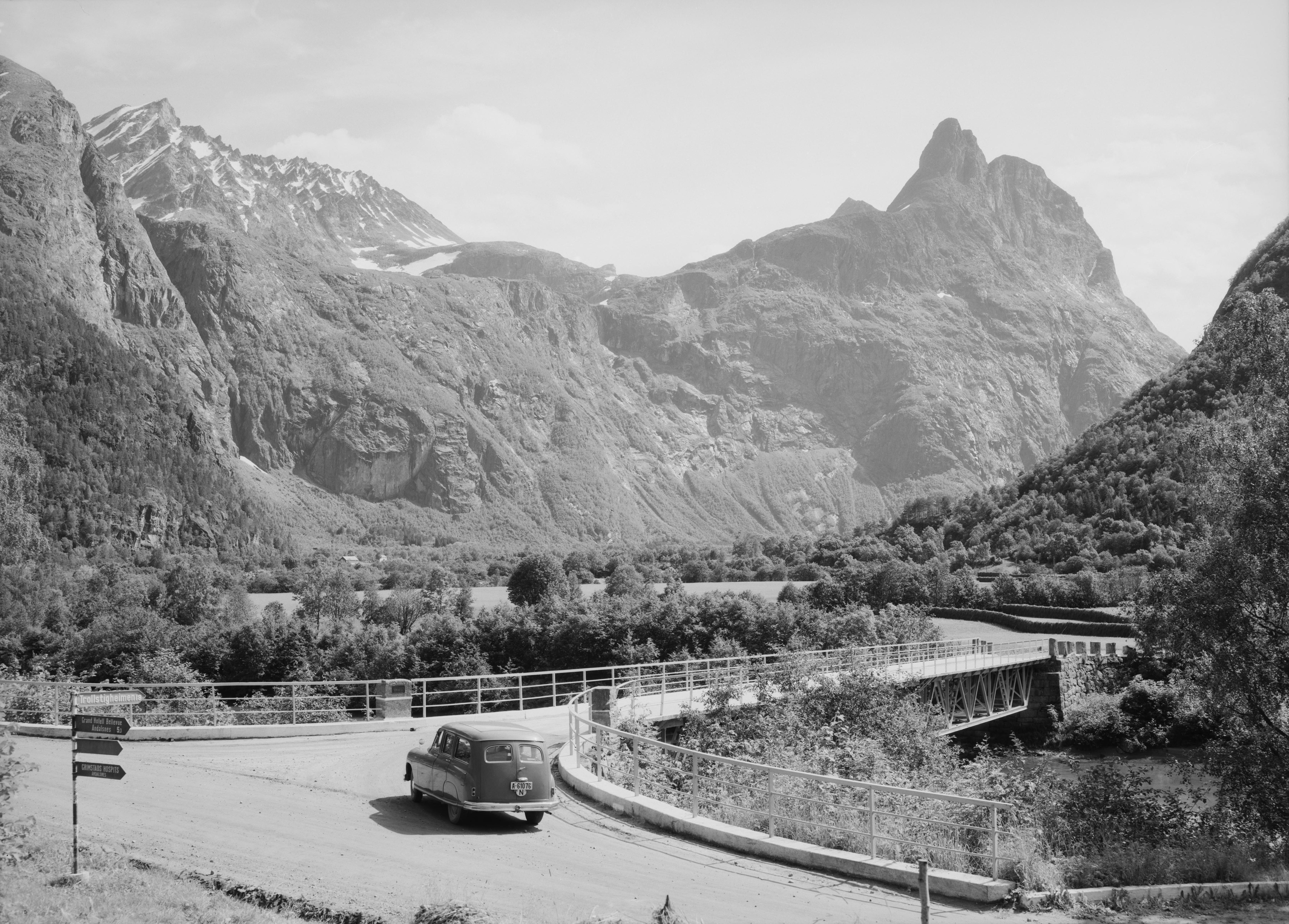
- View of the Sogge Bridge around 1956. Romsdalshornet summit in the background. Credit: Jac Brun
- Coordinates: 62°31′58″N 7°44′13″E
- Carries: County Road 63
- Crosses: Rauma
- Locale: Rauma Municipality

History
- Construction end: 1937

The Sogge Bridge (Norwegian: Sogge bru) is a truss bridge crossing the river Rauma in Rauma Municipality in Møre og Romsdal county, Norway. The bridge carries County Road 63. The intersection between E136 and County Road 63 is located on the north side of the bridge. The first bridge was built in 1877, but was washed away in 1895 or 1896. A new, wooden bridge was then built in 1903 or 1904. The current bridge was built between 1934 and 1937.
