= Nordal =

Nordal may refer to:

== People with the surname ==
- Nordal Wille (1858-1924), Norwegian botanist
- Ólöf Nordal (1966–2017), member of the Icelandic parliament
- Sigurður Nordal (1886-1974), Icelandic scholar, writer and ambassador

== Other uses ==
- Nordal Hundred, a hundred of Sweden
- a barley (Hordeum vulgare) cultivar
