= Valldalen =

Valley in Møre og Romsdal county, Norway

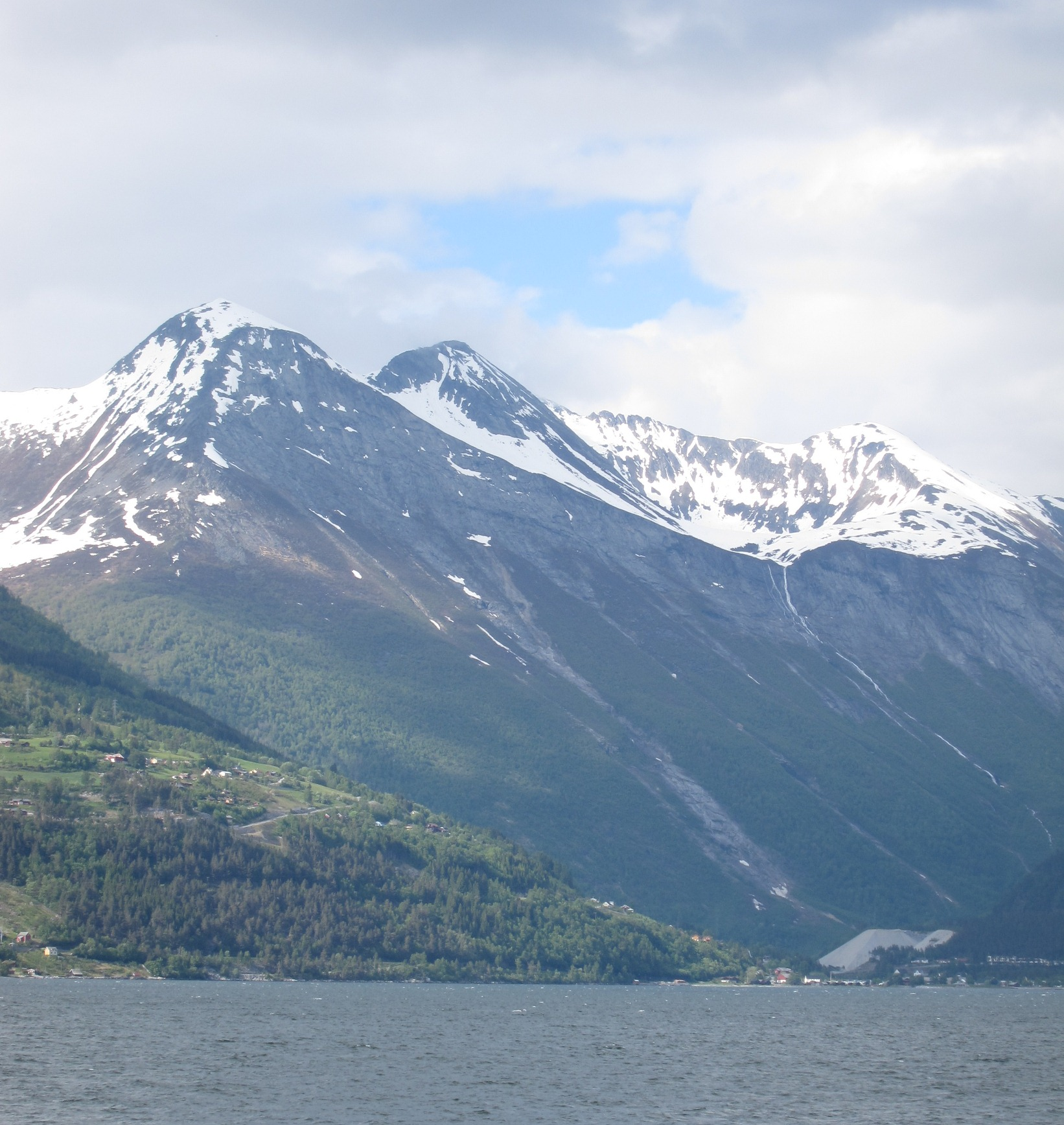
- Valldalen seen across the fjord
- Floor elevation: 100 m (330 ft)
- Length: 25 km (16 mi) NE-SW
- Width: 2.5 kilometres (1.6 mi)

Geology
- Type: River valley

Geography
- Location: Trøndelag, Norway
- Population centers: Sylte
- Coordinates: 62°19′58″N 07°22′52″E

Location
- Interactive map of the valley

Valldalen (or sometimes just Valldal) is a valley in Fjord Municipality in Møre og Romsdal county, Norway. It is located north of Norddalsfjorden. The village of Sylte (which is also called Valldal) is located at the end of the valley along the fjord. The river Valldøla flows through the valley, and the Norwegian National Road 63 follows the river through the valley, on its way north to Trollstigen.

The valley lies just outside the northwestern border of Reinheimen National Park. The valley is fertile with a high amount of berry production, especially strawberries. In 2002, the annual production of strawberries was about 900 metric tons (890 long tons; 990 short tons). Previously there was also cement and wood products industry. There is also the Muritunet centre for rehabilitation.

The 2015 film Ex Machina was filmed at Juvet Landscape Hotel in Valldalen.

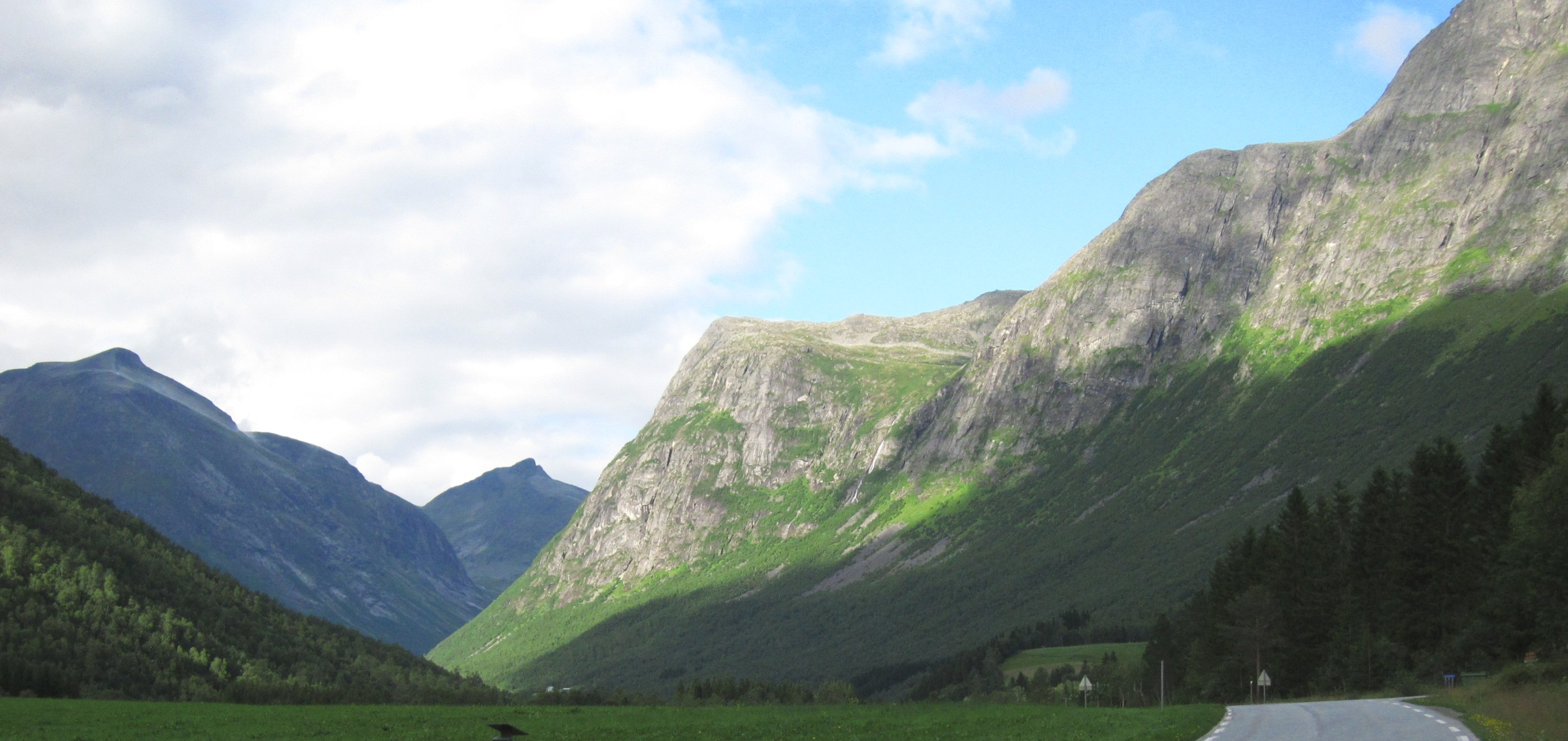
Upper section of the valley, towards Trollstigen.
