= Sylte Church =

Church in Møre og Romsdal, Norway

- Sylte kyrkje
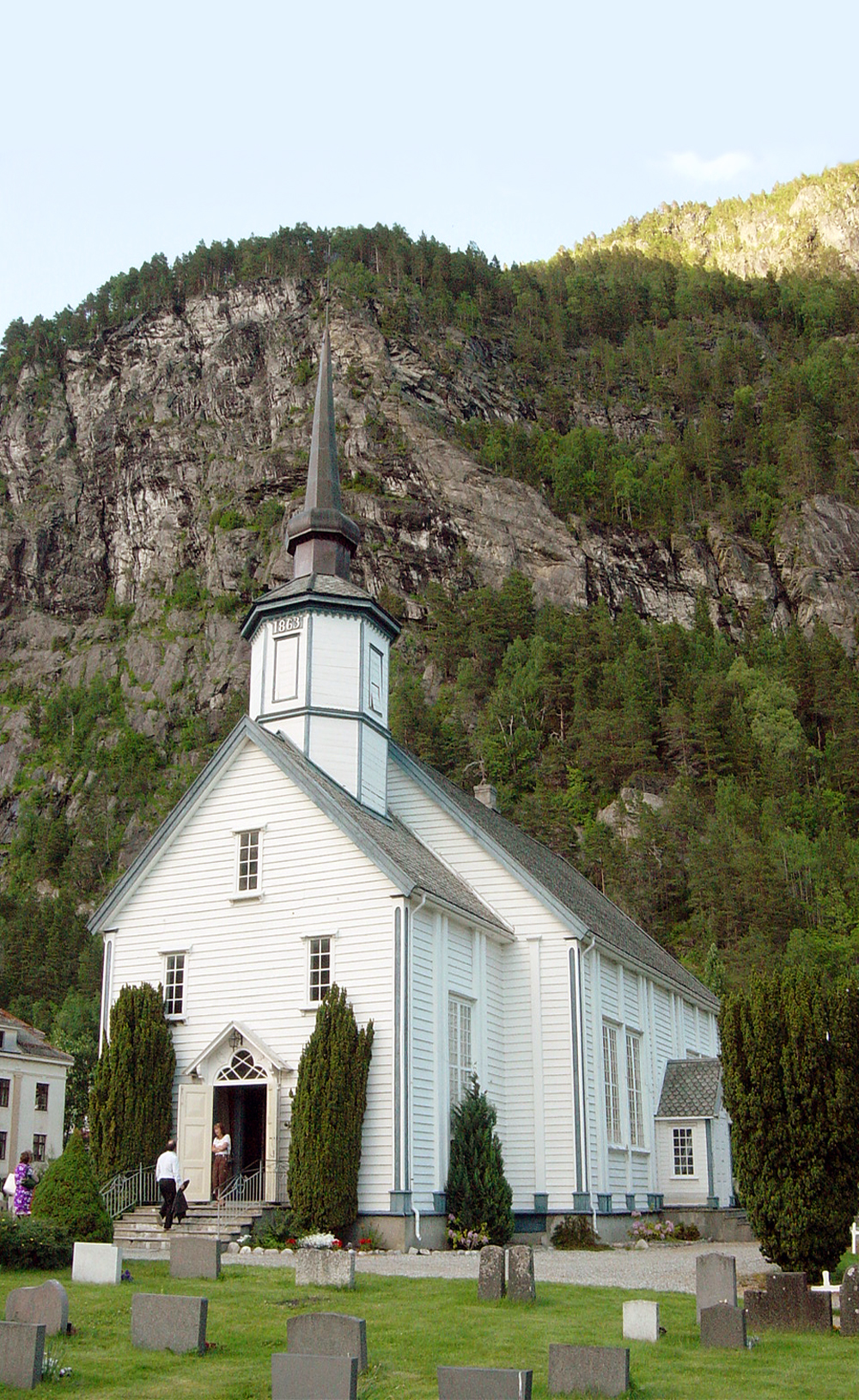
- View of the church
- Sylte Church
- 62.2993367178°N 7.26301699876°E
- Location: Fjord Municipality, Møre og Romsdal
- Country: Norway
- Denomination: Church of Norway
- Churchmanship: Evangelical Lutheran

History
- Status: Parish church
- Founded: 14th century
- Consecrated: 5 Nov 1863

Architecture
- Functional status: Active
- Architect: Nils Liaaen
- Architectural type: Long church
- Style: Empire style
- Completed: 1863 (163 years ago)

Specifications
- Capacity: 350
- Materials: Wood

Administration
- Diocese: Møre bispedømme
- Deanery: Nordre Sunnmøre prosti
- Parish: Norddal
- Norwegian Cultural Heritage Site
- Type: Church
- Status: Listed
- ID: 85026

Sylte Church (Norwegian: Sylte kyrkje) is a parish church of the Church of Norway in Fjord Municipality in Møre og Romsdal county, Norway. It is located in the village of Valldal, which is also known as Sylte. It is one of the two churches for the Norddal parish which is part of the Nordre Sunnmøre prosti (deanery) in the Diocese of Møre. The white, wooden church was built in a long church design in an Empire style in 1863 using plans drawn up by the architect Nils Andersen Liaaen. The church seats about 350 people.

== History ==
The earliest existing historical records of the church date back to 1432, but the church existed earlier. The first church in Sylte was a wooden stave church that was possibly built during the 14th century. From 1610-1634, a man named Arne Eivindsen was the parish priest for Norddal and during his term as priest, there were two churches in the parish (Sylte Church on the north side of the fjord and Norddal Church on the south side of the fjord). There was also a chapel at Døving, just north of Sylte. He decided to close the Sylte Church since there was a chapel near there already and to make the Norddal Church the main church for the parish. However, the old Norddal Church was not in good condition, so in the early 1620s, the old Norddal church was torn down and the old Sylte Church from the village of Sylte on the north shore of Norddalsfjorden was disassembled and moved across the fjord to the village of Norddal where it was rebuilt as the new Norddal Church.

After the church was moved, there was no church in Sylte after the old church was moved. The small Døving Chapel was located about 4 kilometres (2.5 mi) upriver from Sylte and a chapel had been located here for centuries to serve the people of the Valldalen valley, and after the 1620s, it also served the people of Sylte. That chapel building had been newly rebuilt in 1754. In 1812, the Døving Chapel was closed permanently. The building was disassembled and moved to Sylte where it was rebuilt as the new Sylte Church. In 1860, residents began talking about building a larger church in Sylte to serve the growing population. In 1863, a new wooden long church was completed on the same site as the older (smaller) church. The new church was designed by Nils Andersen Liaaen and Jacob Wilhelm Nordan made several improvements to the plans. The lead builder was Gjert Lien from Nordfjordeid, who built a number of churches in Nordfjord and Sunnmøre. The church was consecrated on 5 November 1863.

== Media gallery ==
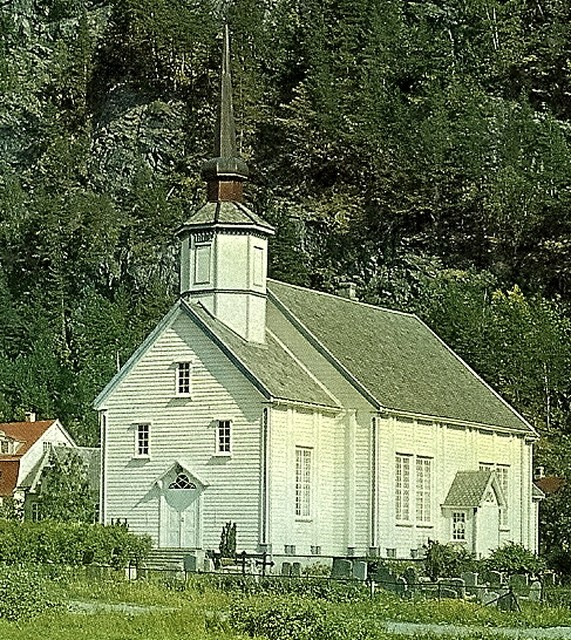

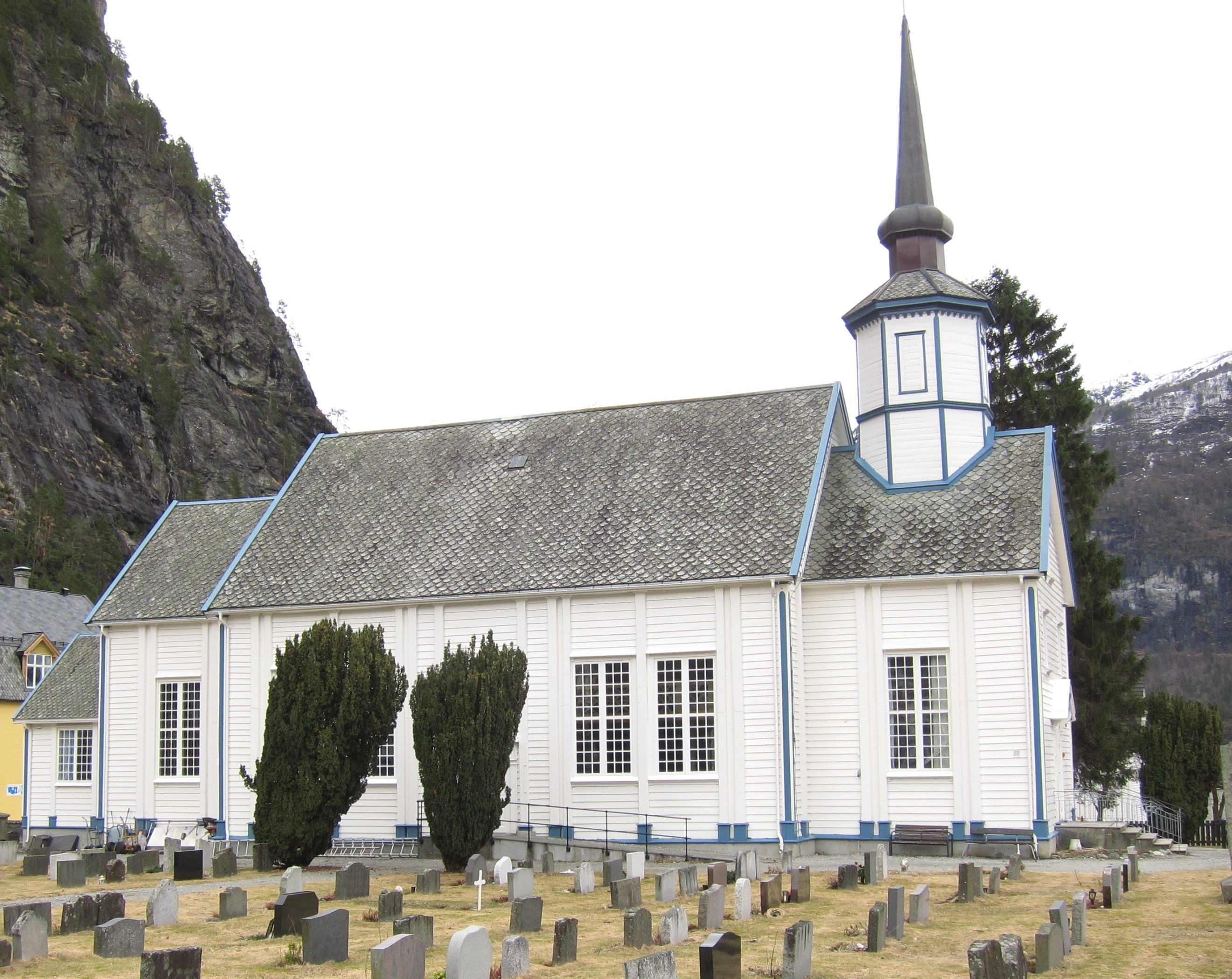

== See also ==
- List of churches in Møre
