= Norwegian County Road 174 =

Road in Norwegian

Coordinates: 60°08′30″N 11°14′27″E

County Road 174

Route information
- Length: 11.8 km (7.3 mi)

Location
- Country: Norway

Highway system
- Roads in Norway; National Roads; County Roads

Norwegian County Road 174 (Norwegian: Fylkesvei 174) is 11.8 kilometers (7.3 mi) long and runs between Nordby and Dalstua in Ullensaker, Norway. Prior to 1 January 2010, it was known as National Road 174 (Riksvei 174).
