= Norddal (village) =

Village in Fjord Municipality, Norway

Norddal Dalsbygda
- Village
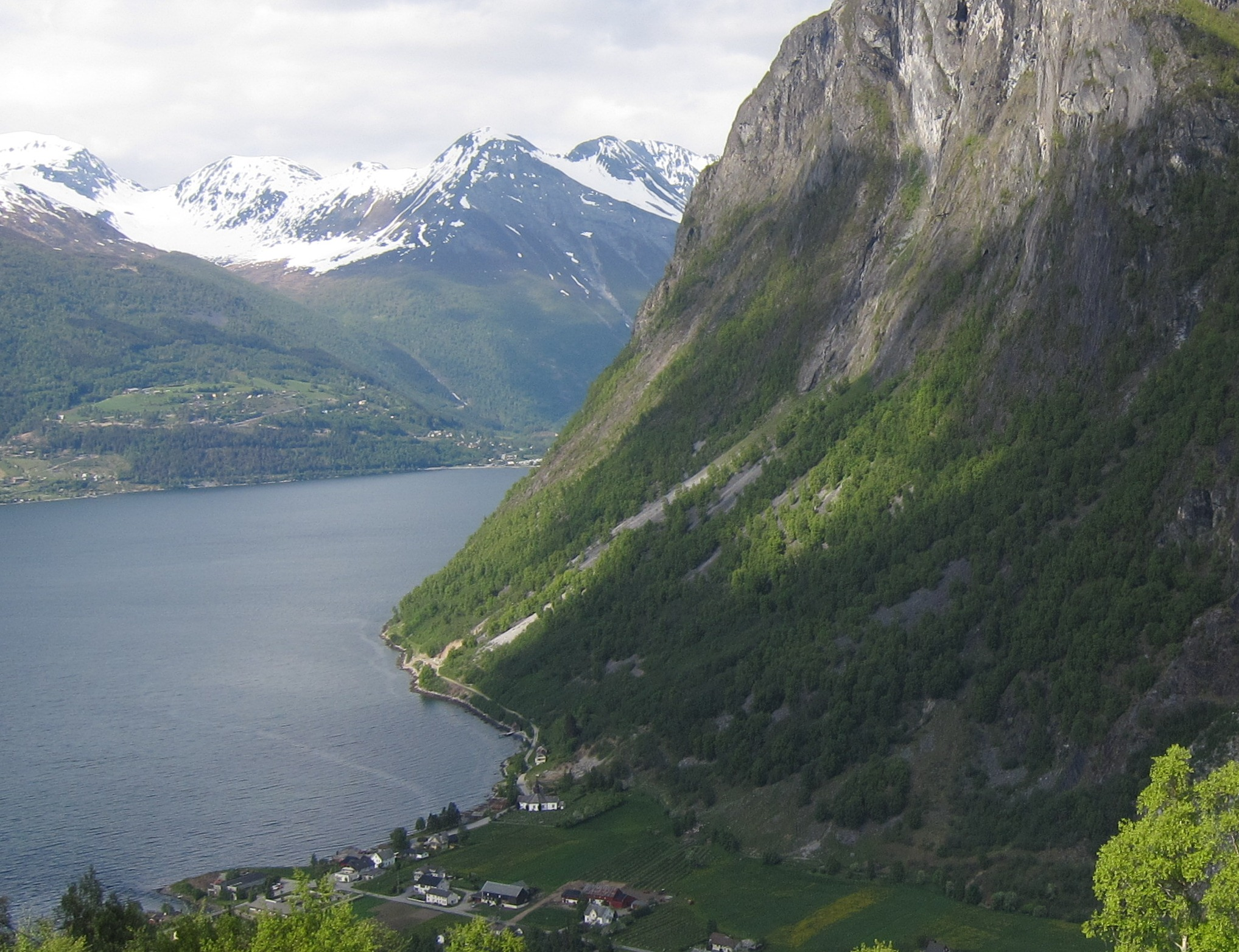
- View of the village in foreground. Across the fjord is Linge (left) and Valldal (center).
- Interactive map of Norddal; Dalsbygda
- Location within Møre og Romsdal Location within Norway
- Coordinates: 62.25171°N 7.23809°E
- Country: Norway
- Region: Western Norway
- County: Møre og Romsdal
- District: Sunnmøre
- Municipality: Fjord Municipality
- Elevation: 9 m (30 ft)
- Time zone: UTC+01:00 (CET)
  - Summer (DST): UTC+02:00 (CEST)
- Post Code: 6214 Norddal

Norddal or Dalsbygda is a village in Fjord Municipality in Møre og Romsdal county, Norway. The village is located in a valley with steep mountains on each side, on the southern shore of the Norddalsfjorden. Norddal is about 4 kilometres (2.5 mi) east of the village of Eidsdal and about 5 kilometres (3.1 mi) across the fjord to the south of the village of Valldal.

Norddal Church is located in the village which has about 150 permanent residents. The only access to the village by road is through the nearby village of Eidsdal. The famous Geiranger area is connected to Norddal by hiking trails over the mountain pass to the south of the village.
