= Norddalsfjorden =

Fjord in Sunnmøre, Norway

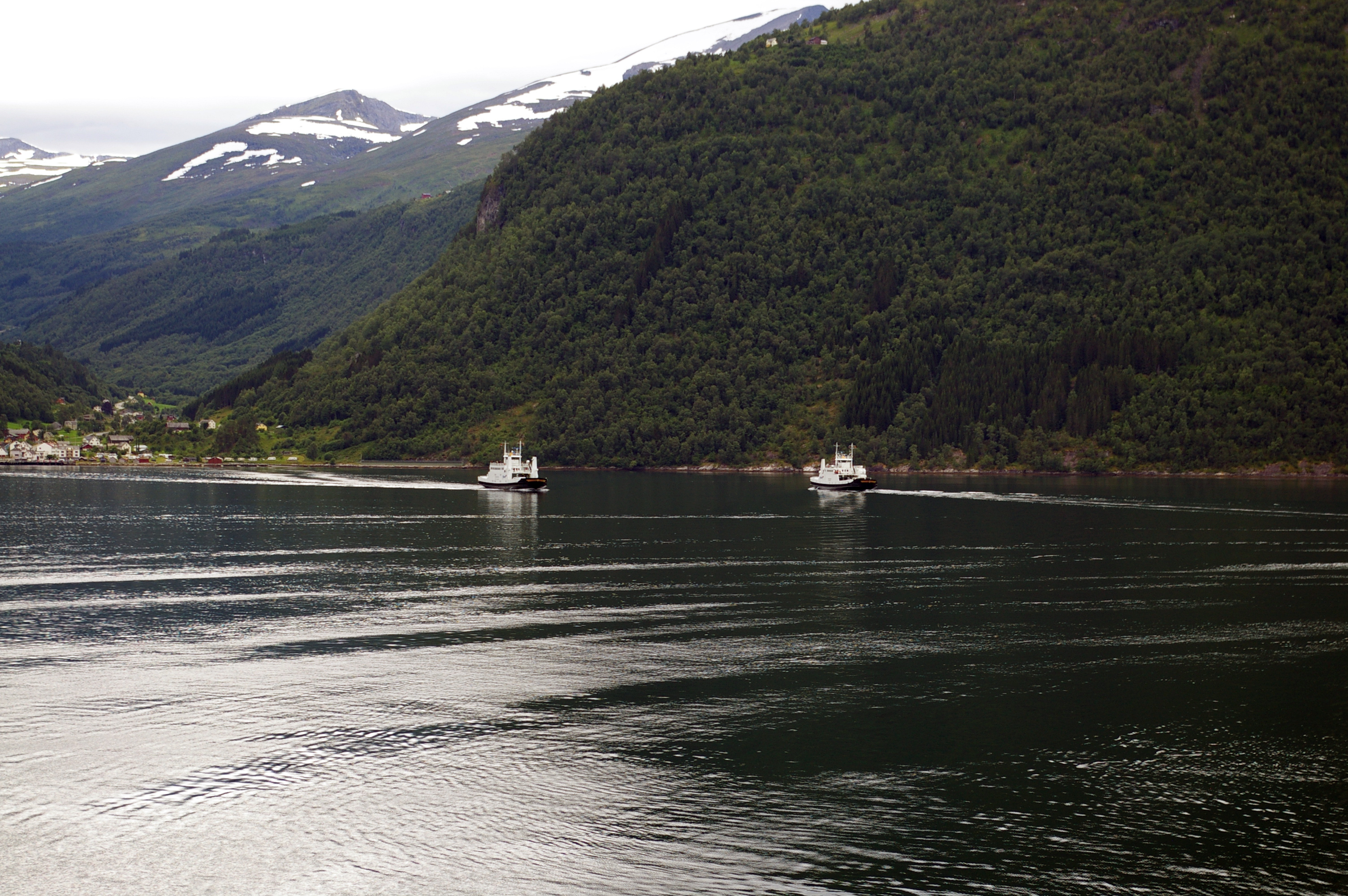
- View of the ferries meeting on the Norddalsfjorden between Eidsdal and Linge
- Interactive map of the fjord
- Location: Møre og Romsdal county, Norway
- Coordinates: 62.2779°N 7.2234°E
- Type: Fjord
- Primary inflows: Valldøla, Eidsdalselva and Storelva rivers
- Primary outflows: Storfjorden
- Basin countries: Norway
- Max. length: 16 kilometres (9.9 mi)
- Max. width: 3.7 kilometres (2.3 mi)
- Settlements: Eidsdal, Norddal, Valldal

Norddalsfjorden is a branch off of the main Storfjorden in Møre og Romsdal county, Norway. The fjord is located in Fjord Municipality and a small part is also in Stranda Municipality. The fjord is 16 kilometres (9.9 mi) long, when you include the Tafjorden arm that stretches further east, it is 24 kilometres (15 mi) in total.

In the Middle Ages, the combined Norddalsfjorden and Tafjorden were probably called «Todarfjorden». Norwegian County Road 63 and Norwegian County Road 650 runs along the fjord and includes a ferry crossing between Eidsdal and Linge. In the 1960s the villages of Stranda-Liabygda-Eidsdal-Valldal-Norddal-Fjørå-Tafjord were still connected by a web of ferry crossings.

The fjord's mouth sits to the west between the village of Liabygda on the northern shore and mount Skrednakken on the southern shore. Further into the fjord, the villages of Eidsdal and Norddal lie along the southern shore, and their respective rivers. Eidsdal is connected to Linge on the northern shore by a ferry. A few kilometers east of Linge lies the village Sylte at the mouth of river Valldøla which runs through the large Valldalen valley. Further east lies the tiny village of Fjøra, at the mouth of Tafjorden. The village of Tafjord lies at the end of the Tafjorden arm.

== Gallery ==
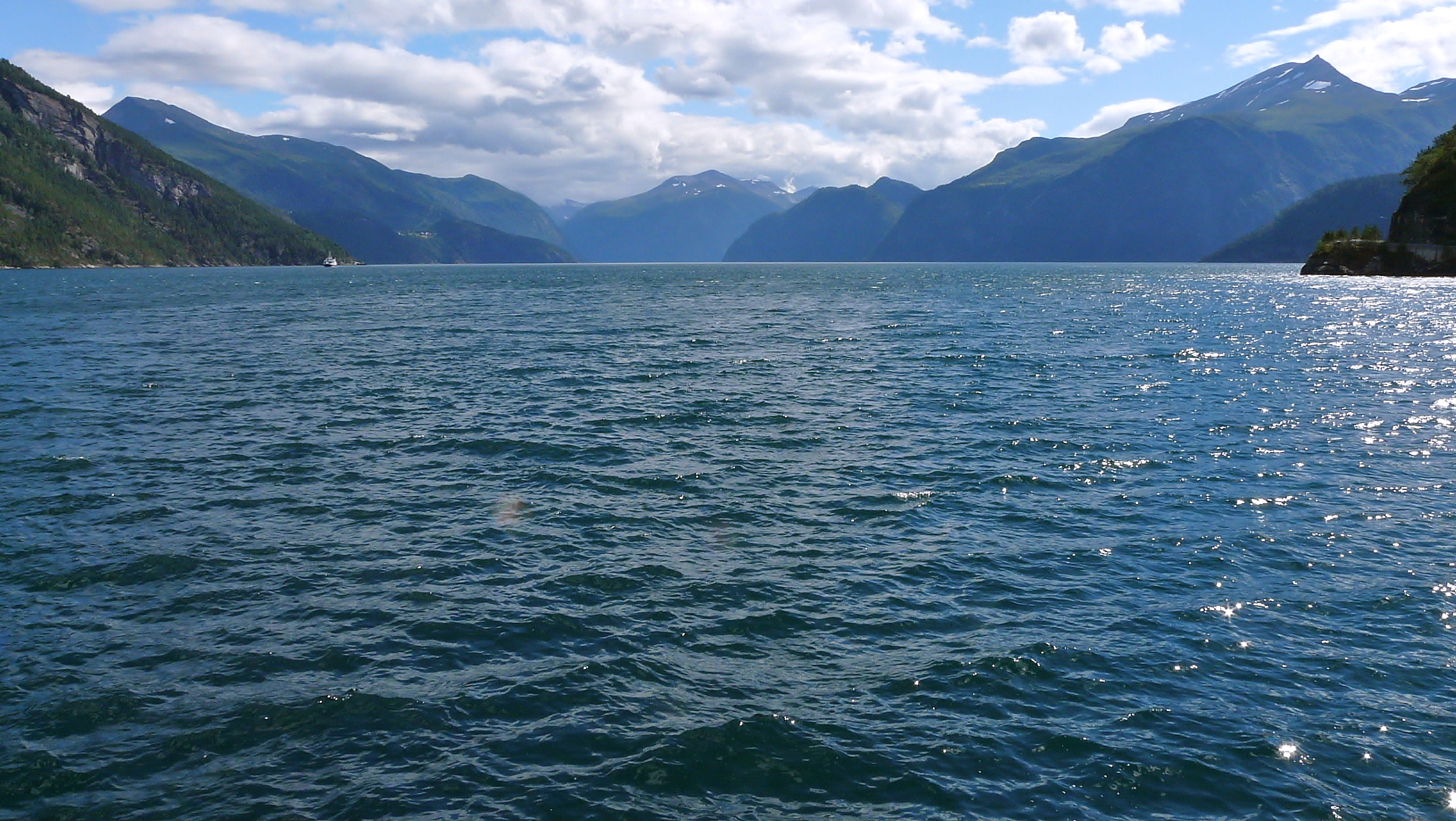
Norddalsfjorden as seen from Stranda-Liabygda ferry

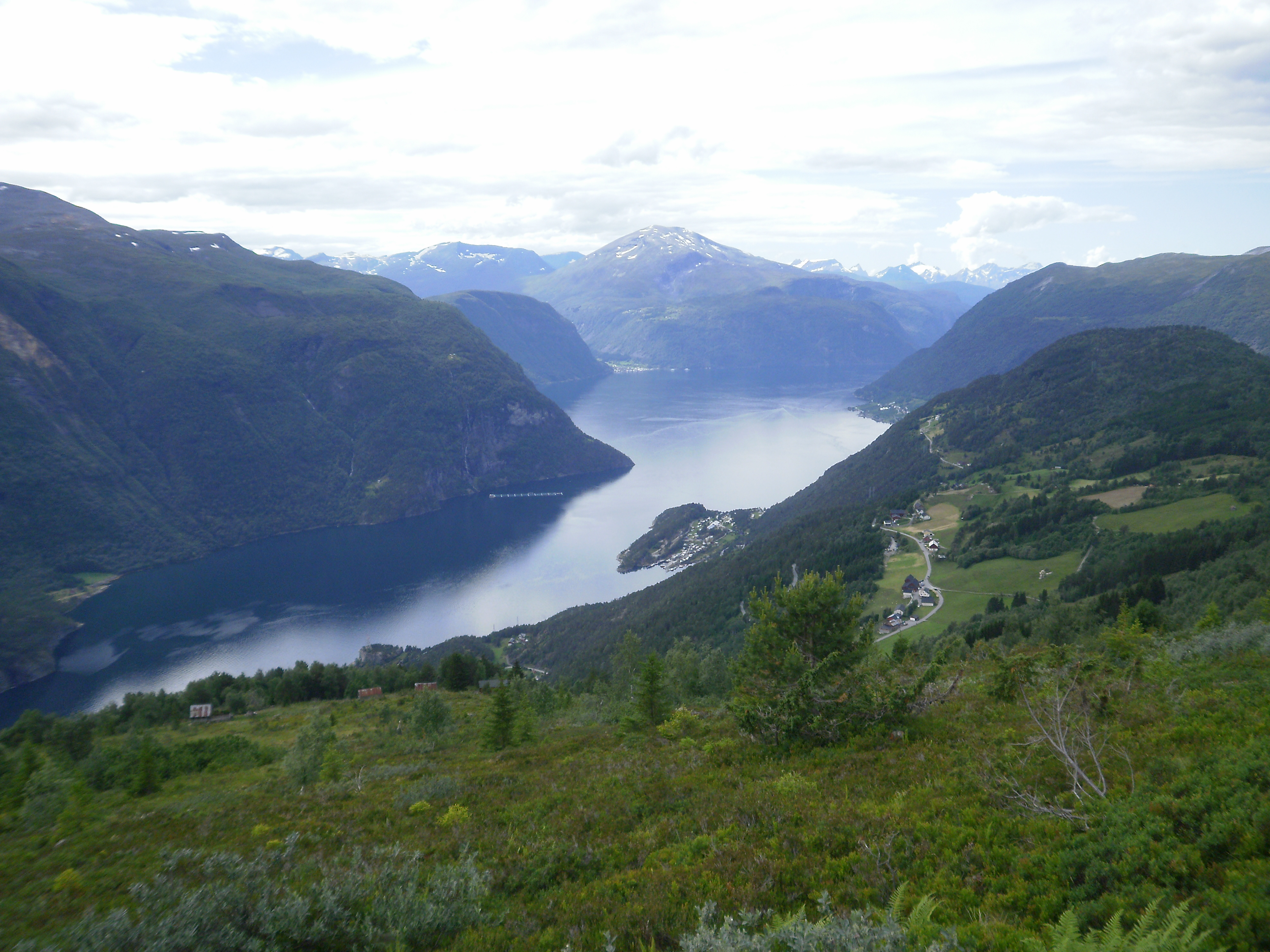
The wide Norddalsfjorden in the distance, more narrow Tafjorden left

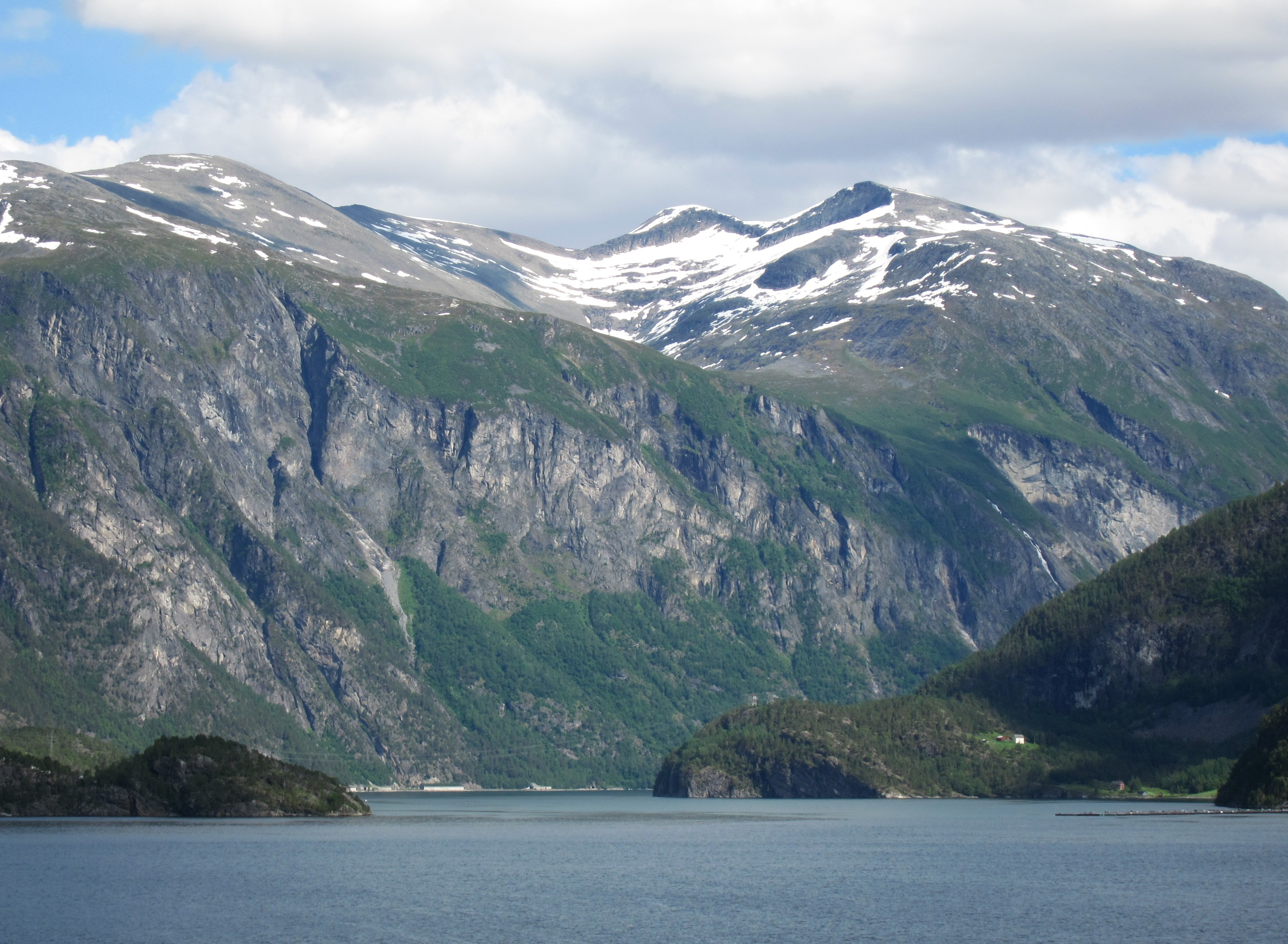
Norddalsfjorden close, Tafjorden behind

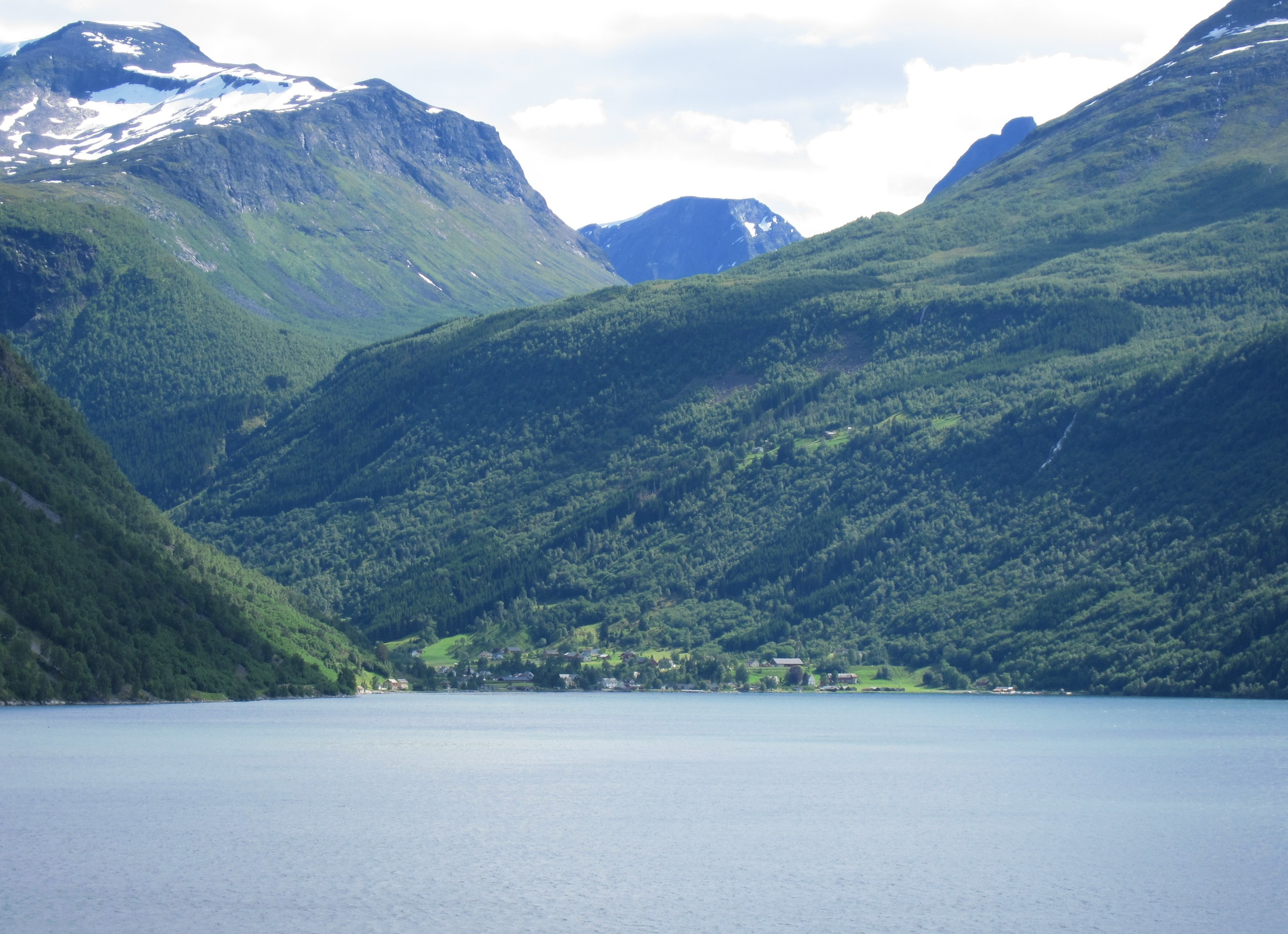
Norddal (Dalsbygda) at the fjord

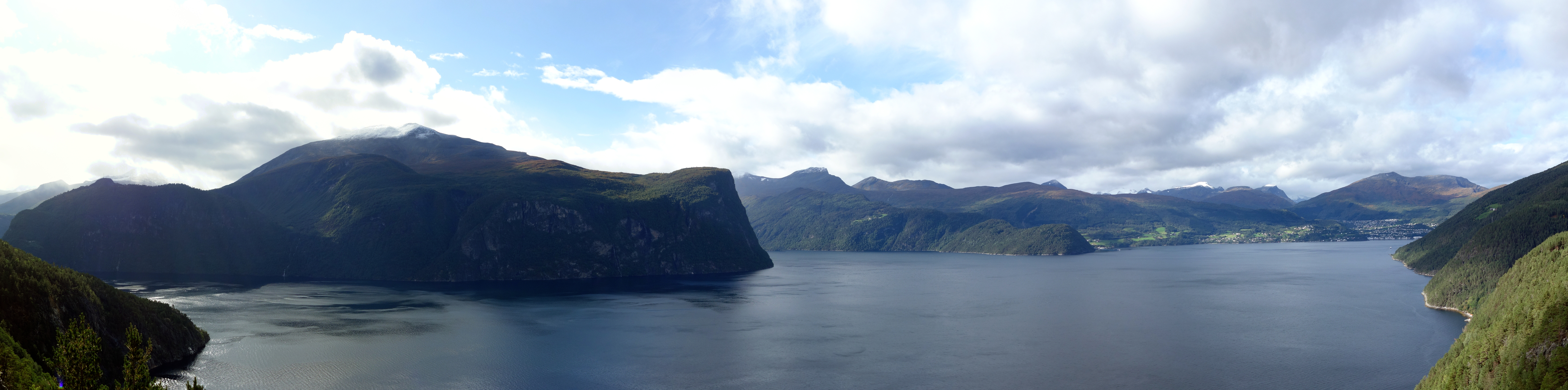
Junction of Norddalsfjorden and Sunnylvsfjorden as seen from the north

== See also ==
- List of Norwegian fjords
