= Sylte, Norddal =

Village in Fjord Municipality, Norway

Sylte Valldal
- Village
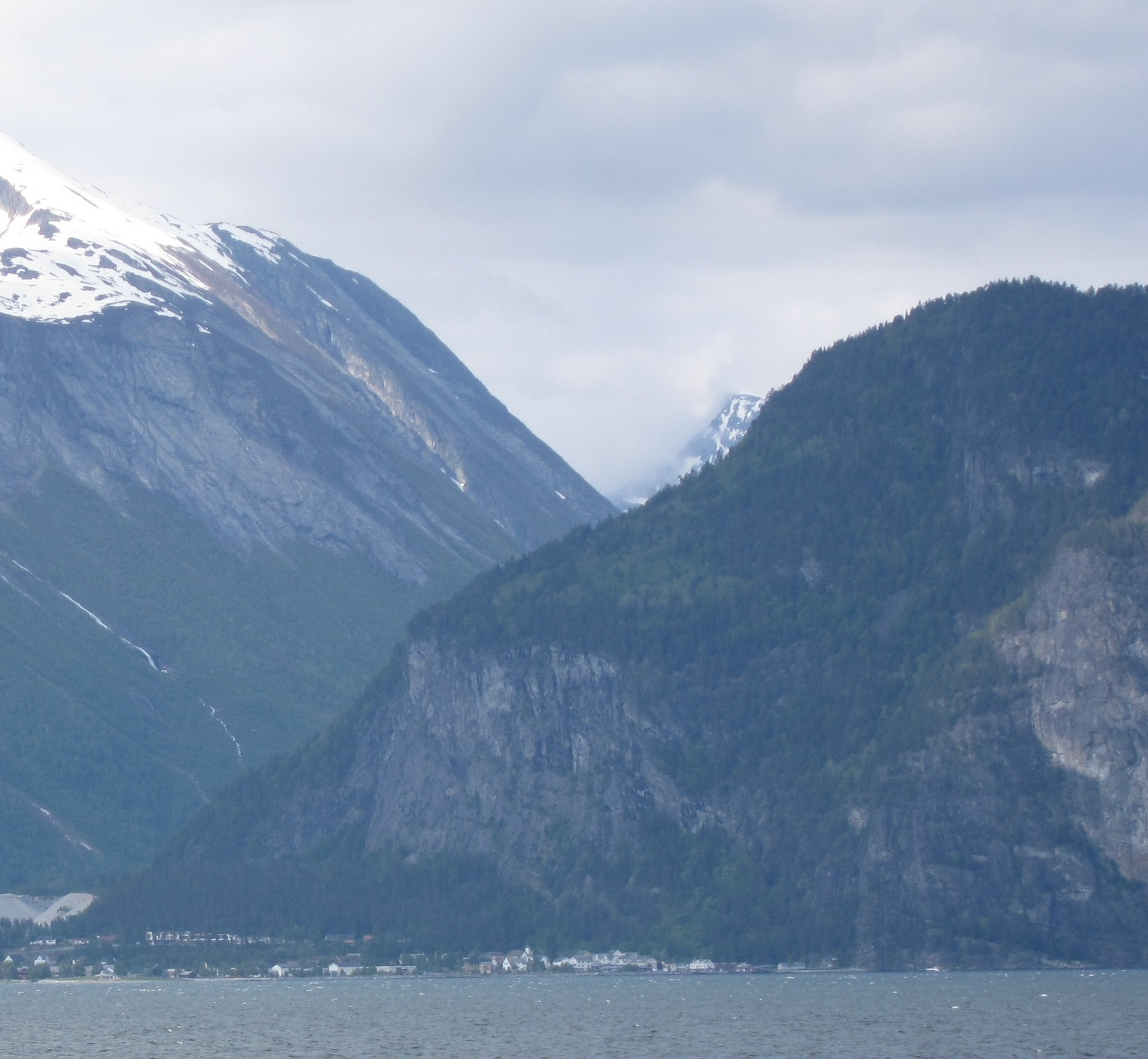
- Village seen across Norddalsfjorden
- Interactive map of Sylte; Valldal
- Location within Møre og Romsdal Location within Norway
- Coordinates: 62.2980°N 7.2626°E
- Country: Norway
- Region: Western Norway
- County: Møre og Romsdal
- District: Sunnmøre
- Municipality: Fjord

Area
  - Total: 0.71 km^{2} (0.27 sq mi)
- Elevation: 3 m (9.8 ft)

Population (2012)
  - Total: 411
  - Density: 579/km^{2} (1,500/sq mi)
- Time zone: UTC+01:00 (CET)
  - Summer (DST): UTC+02:00 (CEST)
- Post Code: 6210 Valldal

Sylte or Valldal is a village in Fjord Municipality in Møre og Romsdal county, Norway. The village is situated at the southern end of the Valldalen valley along the shore of the Norddalsfjorden near the mouth of the Valldøla river, just west of the entrance to the Tafjorden.

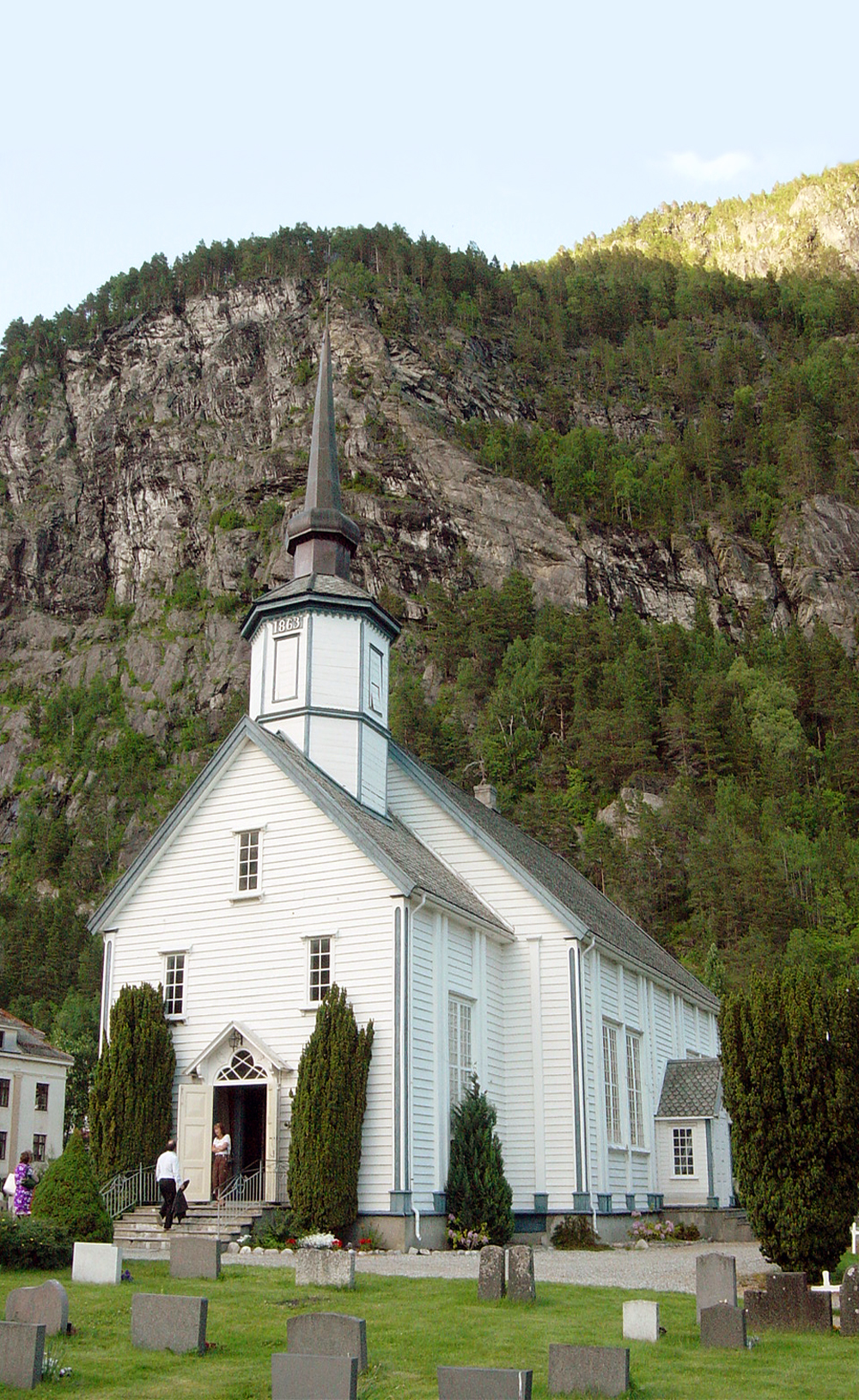
Sylte Church

The 0.71-square-kilometre (180-acre) village had a population (2012) of 411 and a population density of 579 inhabitants per square kilometre (1,500/sq mi). Since 2012, the population and area data for this village area has not been separately tracked by Statistics Norway.

The village is located about 6 kilometres (3.7 mi) northeast of the village of Eidsdal (across the fjord), and it is about 15 kilometres (9.3 mi) northwest of the village of Tafjord which is accessed via several long tunnels including the Heggur Tunnel. Norwegian County Road 63 runs north through Sylte on its way through the Valldalen valley up to the Trollstigen area.

The village is home to many industries, including production of cement and wood products, fish farming, and tourism. The newspaper Storfjordnytt is published in Sylte. Sylte Church is also located here.

== History ==
The name originates from an older word in dialect meaning wet lowland.

The village was the administrative center of the old Norddal Municipality which existed until 2020.
