= Stordal Municipality =

Former municipality in Møre og Romsdal, Norway

Stordal Municipality Stordal kommune
- Former municipality
- Stordalen herred (historic name)
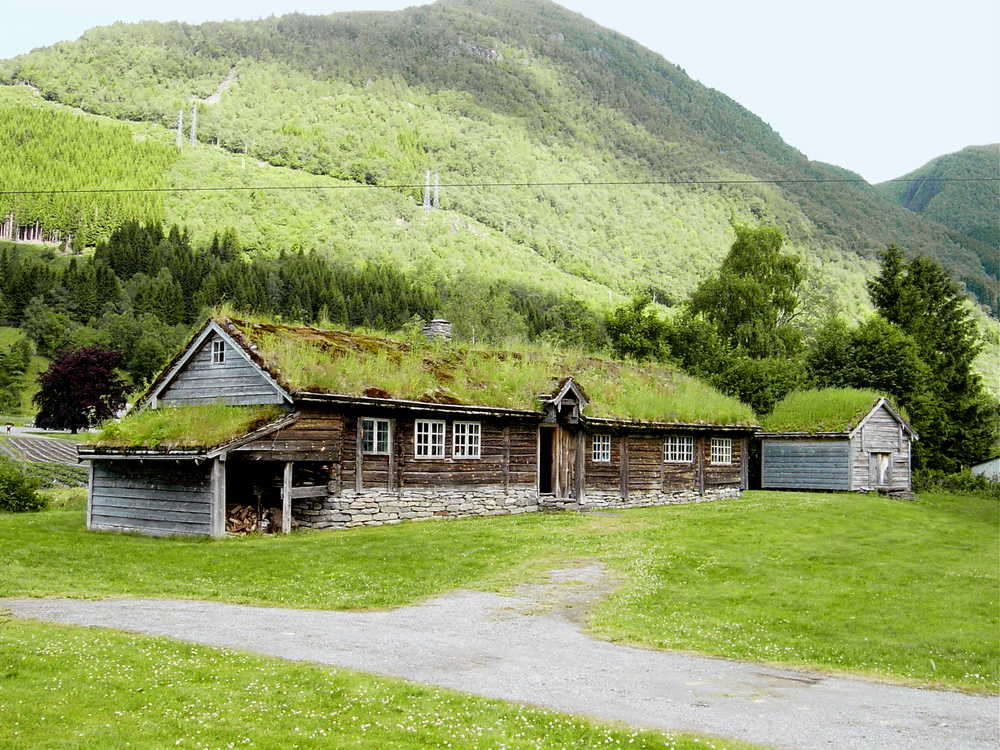
- View of the Løsetstova in Stordal

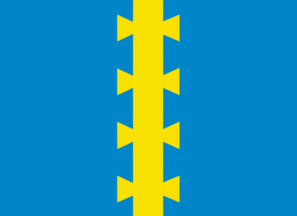
- Flag Coat of arms

- Møre og Romsdal within Norway

- Stordal within Møre og Romsdal
- Coordinates: 62°23′24″N 07°06′38″E
- Country: Norway
- County: Møre og Romsdal
- District: Sunnmøre
- Established: 1 Jan 1892
  - Preceded by: Stranda Municipality
- Disestablished: 1 Jan 1965
  - Succeeded by: Ørskog Municipality
- Re-established: 1 Jan 1977
  - Preceded by: Ørskog Municipality
- Disestablished: 1 Jan 2020
  - Succeeded by: Fjord Municipality
- Administrative centre: Stordal

Government
  - Mayor (2015-2019): Eva Hove (H)

Area (upon dissolution)
  - Total: 247.07 km^{2} (95.39 sq mi)
  - Land: 243.63 km^{2} (94.07 sq mi)
  - Water: 3.44 km^{2} (1.33 sq mi) 1.4%
  - Rank: #306 in Norway
- Highest elevation: 1,531.3 m (5,024 ft)

Population (2019)
  - Total: 947
  - Rank: #398 in Norway
  - Density: 3.8/km^{2} (9.8/sq mi)
  - Change (10 years): ▼ −5.4%
- Demonym: Stordaling

Official language
  - Norwegian form: Nynorsk
- Time zone: UTC+01:00 (CET)
  - Summer (DST): UTC+02:00 (CEST)
- ISO 3166 code: NO-1526

Stordal is a former municipality in Møre og Romsdal county, Norway. The 247-square-kilometre (95 sq mi) municipality existed from 1892 until its dissolution in 2020 (except for a brief time from 1965-1977). The area is now part of Fjord Municipality in the traditional district of Sunnmøre. The administrative centre was the village of village of Stordal. Other villages in the municipality included…

Stordal had relatively good agricultural land, and the main source of income is livestock. Stordal was home to furniture production businesses. The historic farm and museum of Ytste Skotet lies along the Storfjorden in the western part of the old municipality. Most of the municipality was located on the eastern side of the fjord.

Prior to its dissolution in 2020, the 247-square-kilometre (95 sq mi) municipality was the 306th largest by area out of the 422 municipalities in Norway. Stordal Municipality was the 398th most populous municipality in Norway with a population of about 947. The municipality's population density was 3.8 inhabitants per square kilometre (9.8/sq mi) and its population had decreased by 5.4% over the previous 10-year period.

== General information ==
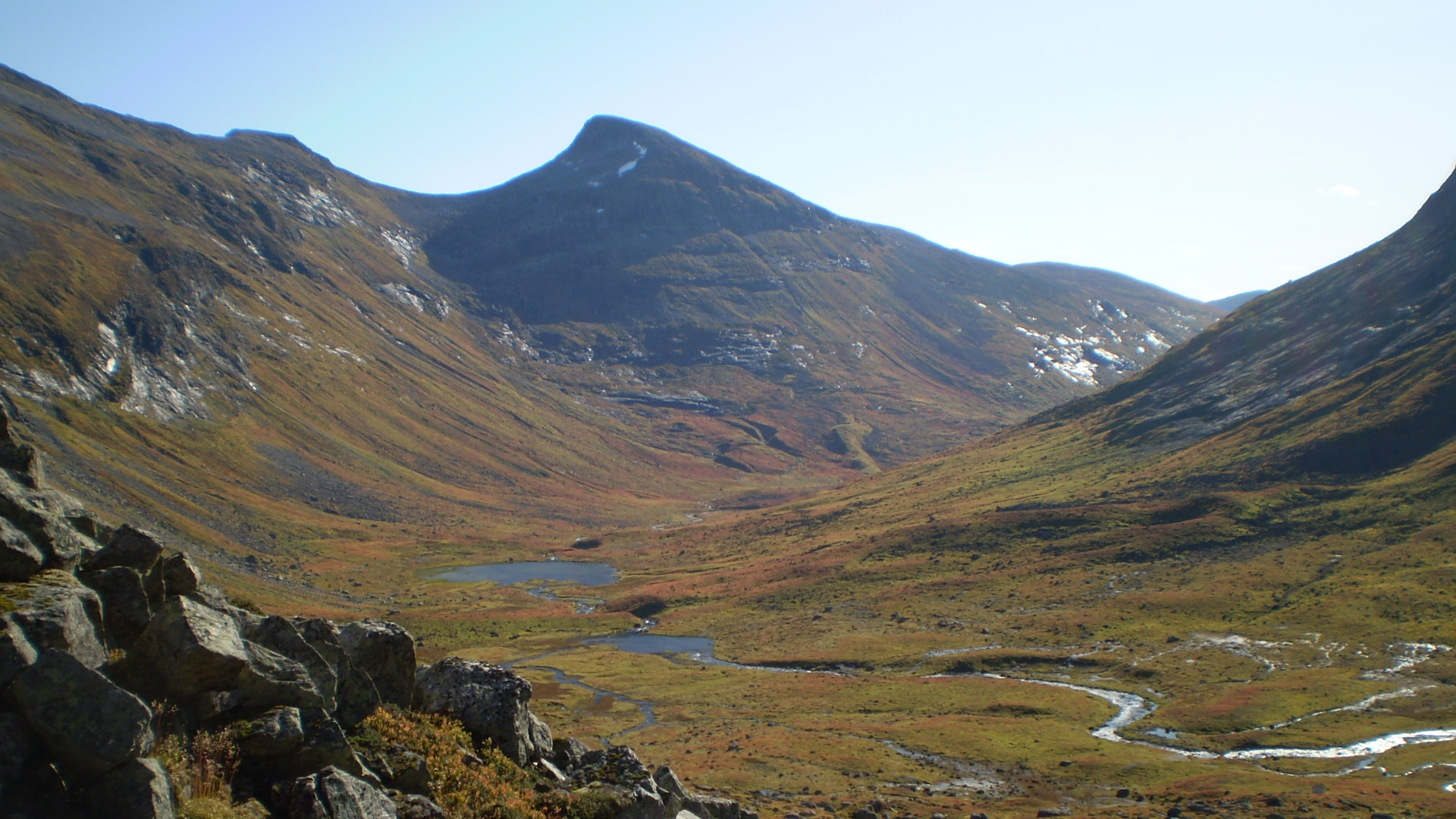
View of the Stordal landscape

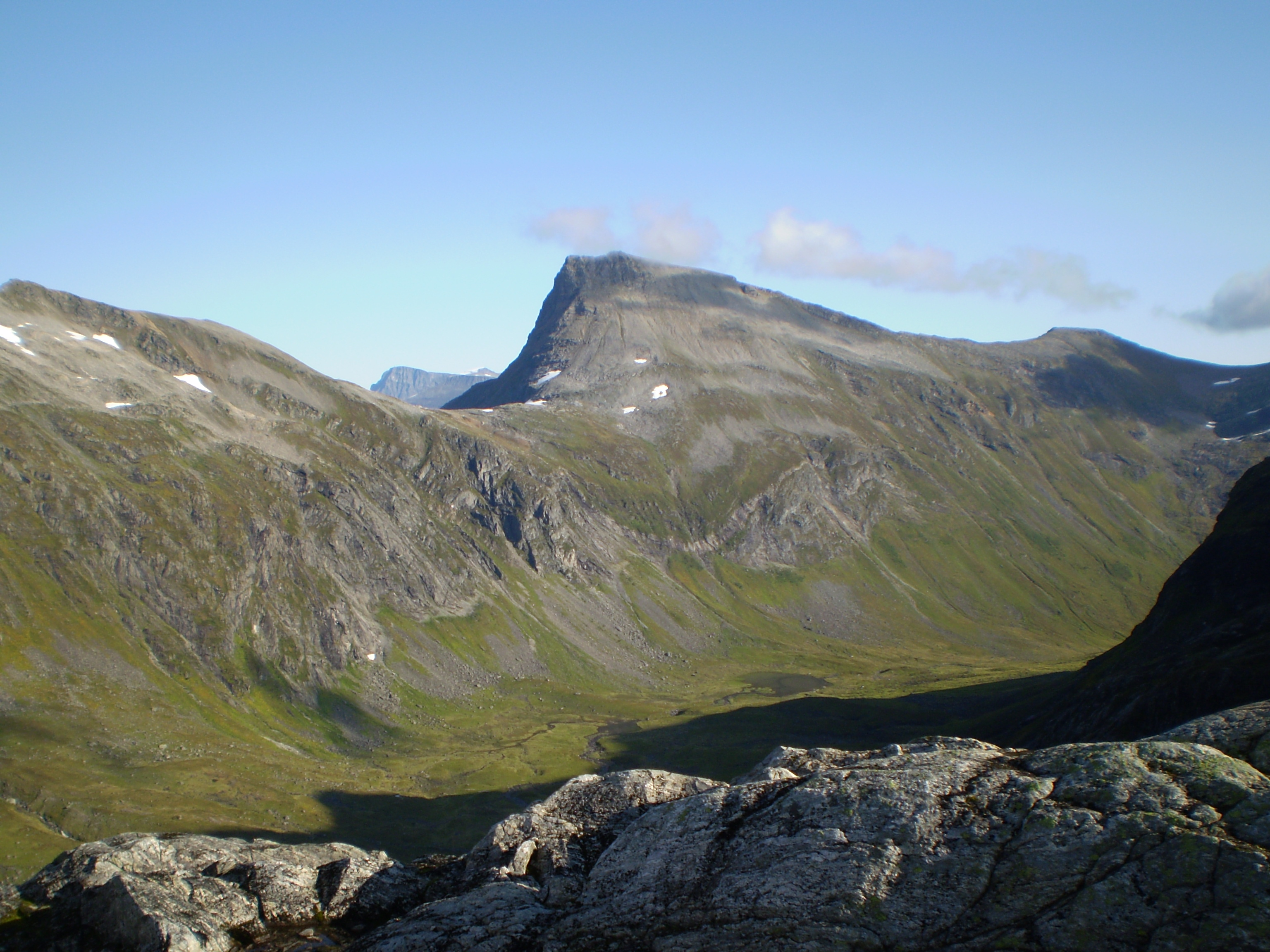
View of the Stordal landscape

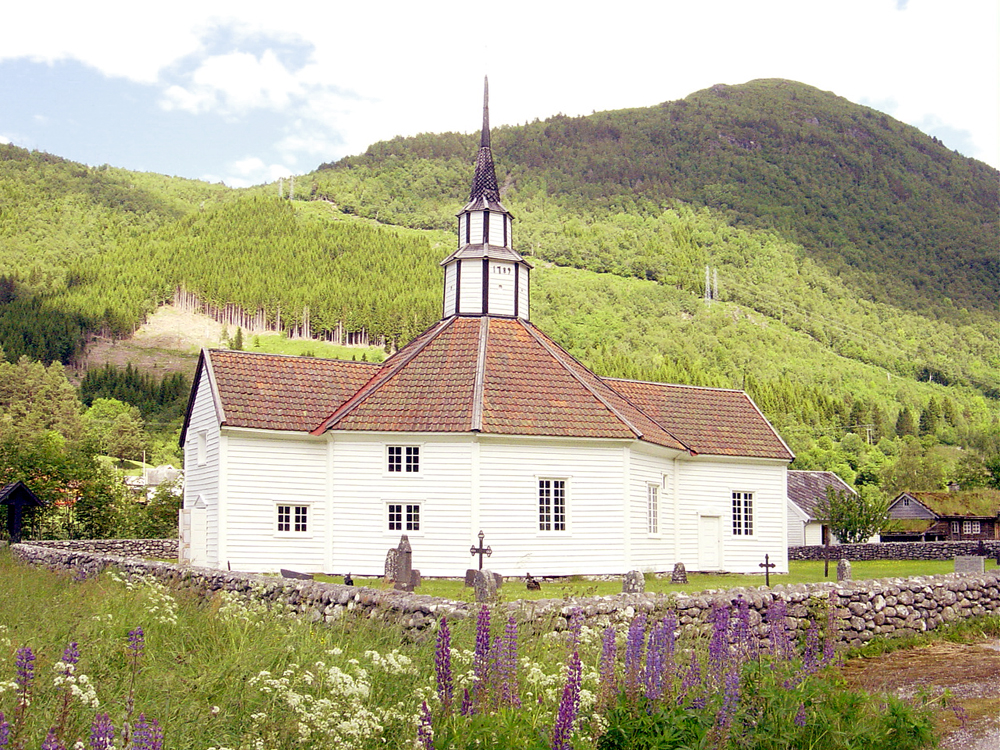
View of the Old Stordal Church

The parish of Stordal was established as a municipality on 1 January 1892 when the large Stranda Municipality was divided into two parts. The northwestern part became the new Stordal Municipality (population: 850) and the southwestern part continued as a much smaller Stranda Municipality (population: 1,459).

During the 1960s, there were many municipal mergers across Norway due to the work of the Schei Committee. On 1 January 1965, Ørskog Municipality (population: 1,664), Skodje Municipality (population: 2,048), and Stordal Municipality (population: 1,052) were merged to form a new, larger Ørskog Municipality. The merger, however, was short-lived, and on 1 January 1977 it was reversed and the three municipalities were once again separated.

On 1 January 2020, Stordal Municipality (population: 972) and Norddal Municipality (population: 1,670) were merged into the new Fjord Municipality.

=== Name ===
The municipality (originally the parish) is named after the local Stordalen valley (Old Norse: Stóladalr). The first element is the plural genitive case of stóll which means "chair" or "throne". The may be because two mountains located around the valley have the name Stolen (meaning "the chair"). The last element is dalr which means "valley" or "dale". Historically, the name of the municipality was spelled Stordalen. On 3 November 1917, a royal resolution changed the spelling of the name of the municipality to Stordal, removing the definite form ending -en.

=== Coat of arms ===
The coat of arms was granted on 30 August 1991 and they were in use until the municipality was dissolved on 1 January 2020. The official blazon is "Azure, a pale dovetailed Or" (Norwegian: På blå grunn ein gull stolpe laga med duestjertsnitt). This means the arms have a blue field (background) and the charge is a pale with dovetailed sides. The charge has a tincture of Or which means it is commonly colored yellow, but if it is made out of metal, then gold is used. The pale symbolises the forestry and furniture manufacturing in the municipality, which traditionally uses a dovetail system to join two pieces of wood. The same symbol also indicates the strong community feeling in the villages. The arms were designed by Jarle Skuseth. The municipal flag has the same design as the coat of arms.

=== Churches ===
The Church of Norway had one parish with one church, within Stordal Municipality. It also included the former church, Rosekyrkja, which was a museum. It was part of the Austre Sunnmøre prosti (deanery) in the Diocese of Møre.

Churches in Stordal Municipality
Parish (sokn)	Church name	Location of the church	Year built
Stordal	Stordal Church	Stordal	1907
Stordal	Old Stordal Church (Rosekyrkja)*	Stordal	1789
*The Rosekyrkja has been a museum church since 1908.

== Geography ==
Stordal Municipality was located along the inner Storfjorden in Sunnmøre. The majority of the municipality was located east of the fjord, while a small uninhabited mountainous area on the west side of the fjord was also part of Stordal. Ytste Skotet is a preserved historic farm/museum that is located on the steep mountainsides on the west side of the fjord. Most of the municipality surrounded the Stordalen valley on the east side of the fjord. The highest point in the municipality was the 1,531.3-metre (5,024 ft) tall mountain Seljebottstinden.

The municipality was fairly isolated, with only two road connections to the outside world. Ørskog Municipality and Vestnes Municipality were located to the north, Rauma Municipality was located to the east, Norddal Municipality and Stranda Municipality were located to the south, and Sykkylven Municipality was located to the west. Norwegian County Road 650 passed through the municipality from north to south, connecting it to Ørskog Municipality to the north and to Stranda Municipality to the south. Due to the mountainous landscape, the highway goes through the Dyrkorn Tunnel and Stordal Tunnel in the northern part of the municipality. The two tunnels are separated by the small village of Dyrkorn.

== Government ==
While it existed, Stordal Municipality was responsible for primary education (through 10th grade), outpatient health services, senior citizen services, welfare and other social services, zoning, economic development, and municipal roads and utilities. The municipality was governed by a municipal council of directly elected representatives. The mayor was indirectly elected by a vote of the municipal council. The municipality was under the jurisdiction of the Sunnmøre District Court and the Frostating Court of Appeal.

=== Municipal council ===
The municipal council (Kommunestyre) of Stordal Municipality is made up of 15 representatives that are elected to four year terms. The tables below show the historical composition of the council by political party.

Stordal kommunestyre 2015–2019
Party name (in Nynorsk)	Number of representatives
Labour Party (Arbeidarpartiet)	6
Progress Party (Framstegspartiet)	1
Conservative Party (Høgre)	5
Christian Democratic Party (Kristeleg Folkeparti)	1
Centre Party (Senterpartiet)	2
Total number of members:	15

Stordal kommunestyre 2011–2015
Party name (in Nynorsk)	Number of representatives
Labour Party (Arbeidarpartiet)	4
Progress Party (Framstegspartiet)	1
Conservative Party (Høgre)	7
Christian Democratic Party (Kristeleg Folkeparti)	1
Centre Party (Senterpartiet)	2
Total number of members:	15

Stordal kommunestyre 2007–2011
Party name (in Nynorsk)	Number of representatives
Labour Party (Arbeidarpartiet)	2
Progress Party (Framstegspartiet)	2
Conservative Party (Høgre)	7
Christian Democratic Party (Kristeleg Folkeparti)	2
Centre Party (Senterpartiet)	2
Total number of members:	15

Stordal kommunestyre 2003–2007
Party name (in Nynorsk)	Number of representatives
Labour Party (Arbeidarpartiet)	2
Progress Party (Framstegspartiet)	2
Conservative Party (Høgre)	7
Centre Party (Senterpartiet)	4
Total number of members:	15

Stordal kommunestyre 1999–2003
Party name (in Nynorsk)	Number of representatives
Labour Party (Arbeidarpartiet)	4
Progress Party (Framstegspartiet)	1
Conservative Party (Høgre)	9
Christian Democratic Party (Kristeleg Folkeparti)	2
Centre Party (Senterpartiet)	3
Total number of members:	19

Stordal kommunestyre 1995–1999
Party name (in Nynorsk)	Number of representatives
Labour Party (Arbeidarpartiet)	4
Conservative Party (Høgre)	8
Christian Democratic Party (Kristeleg Folkeparti)	2
Centre Party (Senterpartiet)	3
Liberal Party (Venstre)	2
Total number of members:	19

Stordal kommunestyre 1991–1995
Party name (in Nynorsk)	Number of representatives
Labour Party (Arbeidarpartiet)	5
Conservative Party (Høgre)	7
Centre Party (Senterpartiet)	6
Liberal Party (Venstre)	1
Total number of members:	19

Stordal kommunestyre 1987–1991
Party name (in Nynorsk)	Number of representatives
Labour Party (Arbeidarpartiet)	5
Conservative Party (Høgre)	4
Christian Democratic Party (Kristeleg Folkeparti)	3
Centre Party (Senterpartiet)	5
Liberal Party (Venstre)	2
Total number of members:	19

Stordal kommunestyre 1983–1987
Party name (in Nynorsk)	Number of representatives
Labour Party (Arbeidarpartiet)	6
Conservative Party (Høgre)	4
Christian Democratic Party (Kristeleg Folkeparti)	3
Centre Party (Senterpartiet)	4
Liberal Party (Venstre)	2
Total number of members:	19

Stordal kommunestyre 1979–1983
Party name (in Nynorsk)	Number of representatives
Labour Party (Arbeidarpartiet)	4
Conservative Party (Høgre)	5
Christian Democratic Party (Kristeleg Folkeparti)	3
Centre Party (Senterpartiet)	5
Liberal Party (Venstre)	2
Total number of members:	19
Note: On 1 January 1977, Stordal Municipality was separated from Ørskog Municipality.

Stordal heradsstyre 1963–1964
Party name (in Nynorsk)	Number of representatives
Christian Democratic Party (Kristeleg Folkeparti)	3
Centre Party (Senterpartiet)	4
Local List(s) (Lokale lister)	6
Total number of members:	13
Note: On 1 January 1965, Stordal Municipality became part of Ørskog Municipality.

Stordal heradsstyre 1959–1963
Party name (in Nynorsk)	Number of representatives
Labour Party (Arbeidarpartiet)	2
Christian Democratic Party (Kristeleg Folkeparti)	3
Centre Party (Senterpartiet)	3
Local List(s) (Lokale lister)	5
Total number of members:	13

Stordal heradsstyre 1955–1959
Party name (in Nynorsk)	Number of representatives
Labour Party (Arbeidarpartiet)	2
Farmers' Party (Bondepartiet)	5
Joint List(s) of Non-Socialist Parties (Borgarlege Felleslister)	6
Total number of members:	13

Stordal heradsstyre 1951–1955
Party name (in Nynorsk)	Number of representatives
Local List(s) (Lokale lister)	12
Total number of members:	12

Stordal heradsstyre 1947–1951
Party name (in Nynorsk)	Number of representatives
Local List(s) (Lokale lister)	12
Total number of members:	12

Stordal heradsstyre 1945–1947
Party name (in Nynorsk)	Number of representatives
Local List(s) (Lokale lister)	12
Total number of members:	12

Stordal heradsstyre 1937–1941*
Party name (in Nynorsk)	Number of representatives
Local List(s) (Lokale lister)	12
Total number of members:	12
Note: Due to the German occupation of Norway during World War II, no elections were held for new municipal councils until after the war ended in 1945.

=== Mayors ===
The mayor (Nynorsk: ordførar) of Stordal Municipality was the political leader of the municipality and the chairperson of the municipal council. The following people have held this position:

- 1892–1910: Lars Martinussen Kirkebøe (V)
- 1911–1919: Knut Johansen Hove
- 1920–1941: Ole Iversen Rødset (Bp)
- 1941–1943: Jens O. Moe (NS)
- 1943–1944: Ole Nygård (NS)
- 1944–1945: Peter Th. Moe (NS)
- 1945–1945: Jakob P. Hove (NS)
- 1945–1945: Ole Iversen Rødset
- 1946–1951: Jakob P. Hove
- 1952–1955: Knut Stavseng
- 1956–1957: Jacob Hove
- 1958–1961: Johan Lianes
- 1962–1964: Severin Flåen
- (1965–1976: part of Ørskog Municipality)
- 1977–1979: Johan Dyrkorn (Sp)
- 1980–1987: Ole Johan Vidhammar (Ap)
- 1988–1993: Ingrid Løset (Sp)
- 1994–2003: Olav Bratland (H)
- 2003–2015: Charles Tøsse (H)
- 2015–2019: Eva Hove (Ap)

== Settlers in Iceland ==
Some people from Stordal settled in Iceland and used Stordal as their last name. The Stordal family is quite known in Iceland but the siblings Sigurður Kristinn Stórdal and Lovísa Stórdal are the most known well-known Stordals currently alive. They are descendants of Egill "Sterki" Stórdal and Ásgerður "Fagra" Stórdal. Egill and his wife became farmers in Stordal which is now known as Skorradalur in Borgarfjörður, Iceland.

== See also ==
- List of former municipalities of Norway
