= Dyrkorn =

Village in Fjord Municipality, Norway

- Village
- Interactive map of Dyrkorn
- Location within Møre og Romsdal Location within Norway
- Coordinates: 62.4218°N 6.9460°E
- Country: Norway
- Region: Western Norway
- County: Møre og Romsdal
- District: Sunnmøre
- Municipality: Fjord Municipality
- Elevation: 10 m (33 ft)
- Time zone: UTC+01:00 (CET)
  - Summer (DST): UTC+02:00 (CEST)
- Post Code: 6250 Stordal

Dyrkorn is a small village in Fjord Municipality in Møre og Romsdal county, Norway. The village is located in a small valley on the eastern coast of the Storfjorden. The village is in a small valley that is surrounded by large mountains. In the innermost parts of the valley, there are some high plateaus where there are small summer mountain farms (see Seter) that were used by farmers for summer grazing of their cattle. The only road access to the village is by tunnels. The Dyrkorn Tunnel connects it to the village of Sjøholt to the north and the Stordal Tunnel connects it to the village of Stordal to the southeast. Across the fjord on the steep mountainside is Ytste Skotet, a preserved historical farm that is now a living museum.

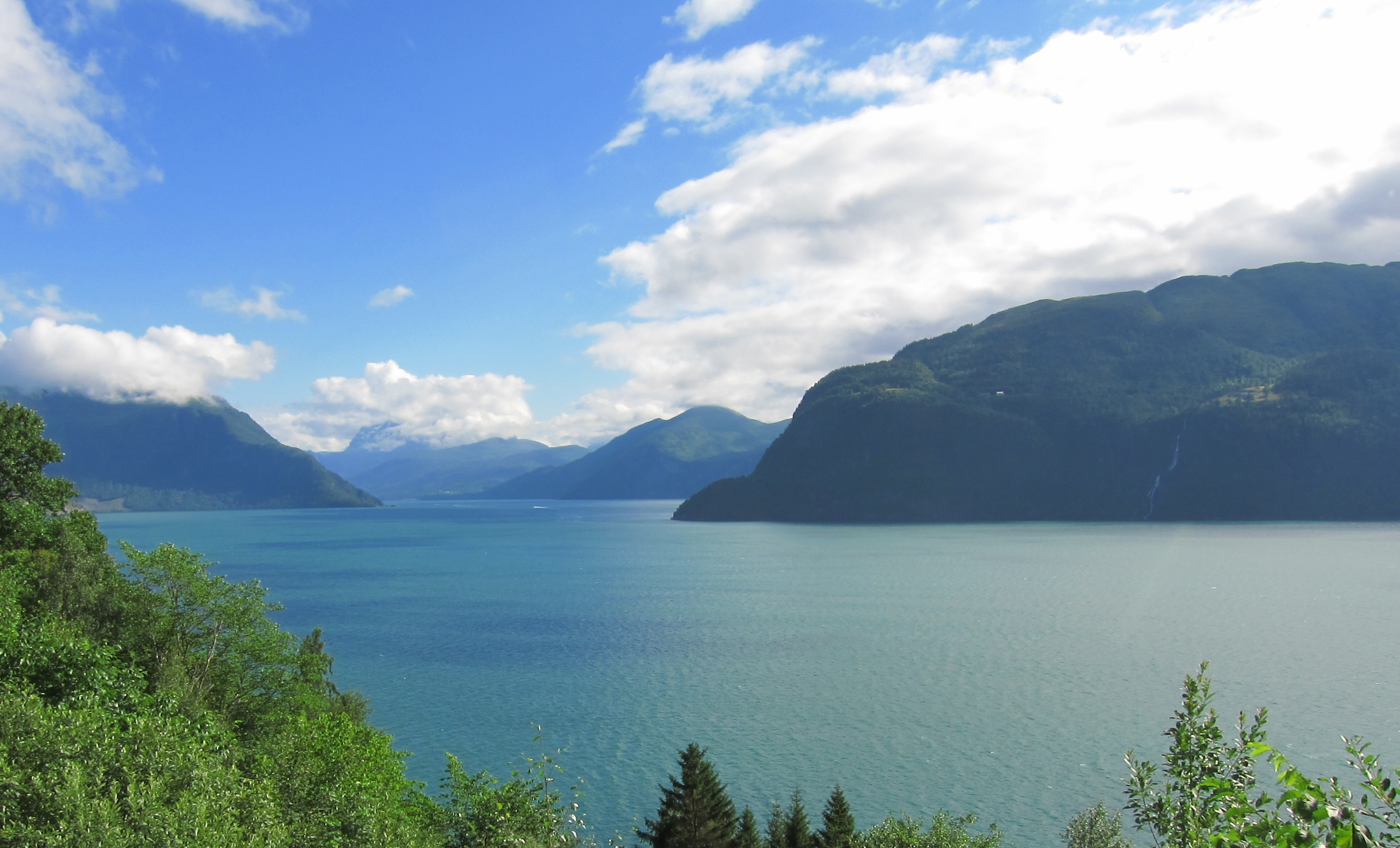
View from Dyrkorn towards Stranda
