= Ørskog Municipality =

Former municipality in Møre og Romsdal, Norway

Ørskog Municipality Ørskog kommune
- Former municipality
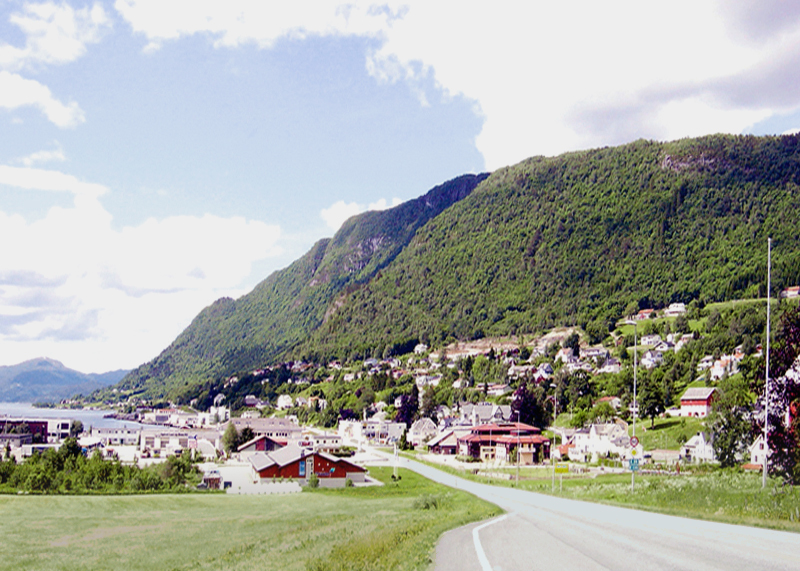
- View of Sjøholt

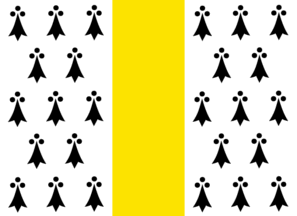
- Flag Coat of arms

- Møre og Romsdal within Norway

- Ørskog within Møre og Romsdal
- Coordinates: 62°28′44″N 06°53′07″E
- Country: Norway
- County: Møre og Romsdal
- District: Sunnmøre
- Established: 1 Jan 1838
  - Created as: Formannskapsdistrikt
- Disestablished: 1 Jan 2020
  - Succeeded by: Ålesund Municipality
- Administrative centre: Sjøholt

Government
  - Mayor (2015-2019): Knut Helge Harstad (H)

Area (upon dissolution)
  - Total: 132.69 km^{2} (51.23 sq mi)
  - Land: 128.24 km^{2} (49.51 sq mi)
  - Water: 3.45 km^{2} (1.33 sq mi) 2.6%
  - Rank: #363 in Norway
- Highest elevation: 1,434 m (4,705 ft)

Population (2019)
  - Total: 2,250
  - Rank: #310 in Norway
  - Density: 17/km^{2} (44/sq mi)
  - Change (10 years): ▲ +5%
- Demonym: Ørskogbygdar

Official language
  - Norwegian form: Nynorsk
- Time zone: UTC+01:00 (CET)
  - Summer (DST): UTC+02:00 (CEST)
- ISO 3166 code: NO-1523

Ørskog is a former municipality in Møre og Romsdal county, Norway. The 133-square-kilometre (51 sq mi) municipality existed from 1838 until its dissolution in 2020. The area is now part of Ålesund Municipality in the traditional district of Sunnmøre. The administrative centre was the village of Sjøholt. The other main village was Vaksvika, about 7.5 kilometres (4.7 mi) south of Sjøholt. The European Route E39/E136 highway ran through the municipality, connecting the towns of Ålesund and Molde. The Rauma Group was the largest company in Ørskog in terms of turnover.

Prior to its dissolution in 2020, the 132.69-square-kilometre (51.23 sq mi) municipality was the 363rd largest by area out of the 422 municipalities in Norway. Ørskog Municipality was the 310th most populous municipality in Norway with a population of about 2,250. The municipality's population density was 17 inhabitants per square kilometre (44/sq mi) and its population had increased by 5% over the previous 10-year period.

== General information ==
Ørskog was established as a municipality on 1 January 1838 (see formannskapsdistrikt law). On 1 August 1883, the southwestern district of Ørskog (most of Ørskog on the southwestern side of the Storfjorden except for the Søvik and Ramstaddalen areas) was separated to form the new Søkelven Municipality (the spelling was later changed to Sykkylven). This left Ørskog Municipality with 1,735 inhabitants. On 1 June 1955, the Søvik and Ramstaddalen areas of Ørskog Municipality (located south of the Storfjorden) were administratively transferred to Sykkylven Municipality.

During the 1960s, there were many municipal mergers across Norway due to the work of the Schei Committee. On 1 January 1965, there was a merger between three neighbors: Stordal Municipality (population: 1,052) in the south, Ørskog Municipality (population: 1,664) in the centre, and Skodje Municipality (population: 2,048) in the north, creating a new, larger Ørskog Municipality. This was merger was short-lived. On 1 January 1977, the merger was reversed all three municipalities were separated once again. This left the newly reconstituted Ørskog Municipality with a population of 1,668.

On 1 January 2020, Ørskog Municipality was merged with Haram Municipality, Skodje Municipality, Sandøy Municipality, and Ålesund Municipality to form a new, larger Ålesund Municipality.

=== Name ===
The municipality (originally the parish) is named after the old Ørskog farm (Old Norse: Øyraskógr) since the first Ørskog Church was built there. The first element is the plural genitive case of eyrr which means "gravel shoal near the mouth of a river". The last element is skógr which means "wood" or "forest".

=== Coat of arms ===
The coat of arms was granted on 11 November 1983. The official blazon is "Ermine, a pale Or" (Norwegian: På hermelin grunn ein gull pæl). This means the arms have a field (background) has a tincture of ermine which means it is commonly colored white with small black spots. The charge is a pale with a tincture of Or which means it is commonly colored yellow, but if it is made out of metal, then gold is used. The pale was chosen to symbolize a tree trunk, as a symbol for forestry. In the 17th century, the municipality exported many tall trees to the Dutch Republic, where they were used for shipbuilding. The ermine background was chosen to symbolize fur farming in the area as well. The ermine is also a canting for the many animals in the forests. The arms were designed by Jarle Skuseth. The municipal flag has the same design as the coat of arms.

=== Churches ===
The Church of Norway had one parish (sokn) within Ørskog Municipality. It was part of the Austre Sunnmøre prosti (deanery) in the Diocese of Møre.

Churches in Ørskog Municipality
Parish (sokn)	Church name	Location of the church	Year built
Ørskog	Ørskog Church	Sjøholt	1873

== Geography ==
The municipality was located on the north shore of the Storfjorden, and it was bordered by Skodje Municipality to the west, Vestnes Municipality to the north and east, and Stordal Municipality to the south. Most of the population lived along the shore or in the small valleys that stretch inland from the fjord. The eastern part of the municipality was mountainous. The highest point in the municipality was the 1,434-metre (4,705 ft) tall mountain Lauparen, a tripoint on the border with Ørskog Municipality, Vestnes Municipality, and Stordal Municipality.

=== Landslide ===
At 10:00 p.m. on 8 January 1731, a landslide with a volume of possibly 6,000,000 cubic metres (7,800,000 cu yd) fell from the mountain Skafjell from a height of 500 metres (1,600 ft) into the Storfjorden opposite Stranda. The slide generated a megatsunami 100 metres (328 ft) in height that struck Stranda, and damaging waves of lesser size traveled as far as Ørskog. It was the first natural disaster to be reported and documented in Norway in historic time.

== Government ==
Ørskog Municipality was responsible for primary education (through 10th grade), outpatient health services, senior citizen services, welfare and other social services, zoning, economic development, and municipal roads and utilities. The municipality was governed by a municipal council of directly elected representatives. The mayor was indirectly elected by a vote of the municipal council. The municipality was under the jurisdiction of the Sunnmøre District Court and the Frostating Court of Appeal.

=== Municipal council ===
The municipal council (Kommunestyre) of Ørskog Municipality is made up of 17 representatives that are elected to four year terms. The tables below show the historical composition of the council by political party.

Ørskog kommunestyre 2015–2019
Party name (in Nynorsk)	Number of representatives
Labour Party (Arbeidarpartiet)	4
Progress Party (Framstegspartiet)	4
Conservative Party (Høgre)	3
Centre Party (Senterpartiet)	2
Joint list of the Liberal Party (Venstre) and Christian Democratic Party (Kristelig Folkeparti)	4
Total number of members:	17
Note: On 1 January 2020, Ørskog Municipality became part of Ålesund Municipality.

Ørskog kommunestyre 2011–2015
Party name (in Nynorsk)	Number of representatives
Labour Party (Arbeidarpartiet)	4
Progress Party (Framstegspartiet)	5
Conservative Party (Høgre)	2
Centre Party (Senterpartiet)	4
Joint list of the Liberal Party (Venstre) and Christian Democratic Party (Kristelig Folkeparti)	2
Total number of members:	17

Ørskog kommunestyre 2007–2011
Party name (in Nynorsk)	Number of representatives
Labour Party (Arbeidarpartiet)	4
Progress Party (Framstegspartiet)	4
Conservative Party (Høgre)	3
Joint list of the Centre Party (Senterpartiet), Christian Democratic Party (Kristeleg Folkeparti), and Liberal Party (Venstre)	6
Total number of members:	17

Ørskog kommunestyre 2003–2007
Party name (in Nynorsk)	Number of representatives
Labour Party (Arbeidarpartiet)	3
Progress Party (Framstegspartiet)	5
Conservative Party (Høgre)	4
Centre Party (Senterpartiet)	2
Joint list of the Liberal Party (Venstre) and Christian Democratic Party (Kristelig Folkeparti)	5
Total number of members:	19

Ørskog kommunestyre 1999–2003
Party name (in Nynorsk)	Number of representatives
Labour Party (Arbeidarpartiet)	4
Progress Party (Framstegspartiet)	2
Conservative Party (Høgre)	6
Pensioners' Party (Pensjonistpartiet)	1
Centre Party (Senterpartiet)	4
Liberal Party (Venstre)	2
Total number of members:	19

Ørskog kommunestyre 1995–1999
Party name (in Nynorsk)	Number of representatives
Labour Party (Arbeidarpartiet)	3
Progress Party (Framstegspartiet)	2
Conservative Party (Høgre)	2
Pensioners' Party (Pensjonistpartiet)	1
Centre Party (Senterpartiet)	4
Liberal Party (Venstre)	5
Sjøholt school area (Sjøholt skulekrins)	2
Total number of members:	19

Ørskog kommunestyre 1991–1995
Party name (in Nynorsk)	Number of representatives
Labour Party (Arbeidarpartiet)	5
Progress Party (Framstegspartiet)	3
Conservative Party (Høgre)	4
Christian Democratic Party (Kristeleg Folkeparti)	2
Centre Party (Senterpartiet)	4
Liberal Party (Venstre)	1
Total number of members:	19

Ørskog kommunestyre 1987–1991
Party name (in Nynorsk)	Number of representatives
Labour Party (Arbeidarpartiet)	3
Progress Party (Framstegspartiet)	5
Conservative Party (Høgre)	3
Christian Democratic Party (Kristeleg Folkeparti)	3
Centre Party (Senterpartiet)	3
Liberal Party (Venstre)	2
Total number of members:	19

Ørskog kommunestyre 1983–1987
Party name (in Nynorsk)	Number of representatives
Labour Party (Arbeidarpartiet)	3
Progress Party (Framstegspartiet)	3
Conservative Party (Høgre)	4
Christian Democratic Party (Kristeleg Folkeparti)	3
Centre Party (Senterpartiet)	3
Liberal Party (Venstre)	3
Total number of members:	19

Ørskog kommunestyre 1979–1983
Party name (in Nynorsk)	Number of representatives
Labour Party (Arbeidarpartiet)	3
Progress Party (Framstegspartiet)	1
Conservative Party (Høgre)	4
Christian Democratic Party (Kristeleg Folkeparti)	3
Centre Party (Senterpartiet)	3
Liberal Party (Venstre)	2
Election list in Ørskog (Valliste i Ørskog)	2
Non-party election list in Vaksvik (Upolitisk valliste i Vaksvik)	1
Total number of members:	19

Ørskog kommunestyre 1975–1979
Party name (in Nynorsk)	Number of representatives
Labour Party (Arbeidarpartiet)	2
Christian Democratic Party (Kristeleg Folkeparti)	4
Centre Party (Senterpartiet)	4
Liberal Party (Venstre)	2
Non-party election list for Ørskog (Upolitisk Valliste for Ørskog)	3
Election list for Skodje (Valliste for Skodje)	8
Election list for Stordal and Dyrkorn (Valliste for Stordal og Dyrkorn)	6
Total number of members:	29

Ørskog kommunestyre 1971–1975
Party name (in Nynorsk)	Number of representatives
Labour Party (Arbeidarpartiet)	3
Conservative Party (Høgre)	1
Christian Democratic Party (Kristeleg Folkeparti)	3
Centre Party (Senterpartiet)	4
Liberal Party (Venstre)	2
Local List(s) (Lokale lister)	16
Total number of members:	29

Ørskog kommunestyre 1967–1971
Party name (in Nynorsk)	Number of representatives
Labour Party (Arbeidarpartiet)	3
Conservative Party (Høgre)	1
Christian Democratic Party (Kristeleg Folkeparti)	3
Centre Party (Senterpartiet)	3
Liberal Party (Venstre)	2
Local List(s) (Lokale lister)	17
Total number of members:	29

Ørskog kommunestyre 1963–1967
Party name (in Nynorsk)	Number of representatives
Labour Party (Arbeidarpartiet)	4
Conservative Party (Høgre)	3
Christian Democratic Party (Kristeleg Folkeparti)	2
Centre Party (Senterpartiet)	4
Liberal Party (Venstre)	3
Local List(s) (Lokale lister)	1
Total number of members:	17

Ørskog heradsstyre 1959–1963
Party name (in Nynorsk)	Number of representatives
Labour Party (Arbeidarpartiet)	3
Local List(s) (Lokale lister)	14
Total number of members:	17

Ørskog heradsstyre 1955–1959
Party name (in Nynorsk)	Number of representatives
Local List(s) (Lokale lister)	17
Total number of members:	17

Ørskog heradsstyre 1951–1955
Party name (in Nynorsk)	Number of representatives
Local List(s) (Lokale lister)	16
Total number of members:	16

Ørskog heradsstyre 1947–1951
Party name (in Nynorsk)	Number of representatives
Labour Party (Arbeidarpartiet)	3
Local List(s) (Lokale lister)	13
Total number of members:	16

Ørskog heradsstyre 1945–1947
Party name (in Nynorsk)	Number of representatives
List of workers, fishermen, and small farmholders (Arbeidarar, fiskarar, småbrukarar liste)	3
Local List(s) (Lokale lister)	13
Total number of members:	16

Ørskog heradsstyre 1937–1941*
Party name (in Nynorsk)	Number of representatives
Labour Party (Arbeidarpartiet)	3
Local List(s) (Lokale lister)	13
Total number of members:	16
Note: Due to the German occupation of Norway during World War II, no elections were held for new municipal councils until after the war ended in 1945.

=== Mayors ===
The mayor (Nynorsk: ordførar) of Ørskog Municipality was the political leader of the municipality and the chairperson of the municipal council. The following people have held this position:

- 1838–1839: Ole Sollied
- 1840–1844: Schølberg
- 1844–1845: Ole Sollied
- 1846–1849: Fredrik Krabbe
- 1850–1863: Lars Strømme
- 1864–1867: Fredrik Søholt
- 1868–1881: Aamund Aure
- 1882–1883: Lars P. Grebstad
- 1883–1885: Ole Strømme
- 1886–1889: P. Skarbø
- 1890–1913: P. Th. Gjære (V)
- 1914–1919: Tore P. Gjære
- 1920–1934: Tore Vaksvik (V)
- 1935–1945: Ole P. Solnørdal
- 1945–1945: Olav Sjøholt
- 1946–1951: Per Gjære
- 1952–1957: Hans Busæt
- 1958–1959: Bjarne Hansen
- 1960–1964: Hans Busæt
- 1965–1971: Jostein Valde
- 1972–1975: Otto Berg
- 1976–1987: Lars Vethe (Sp)
- 1988–1989: Mons-Olav Walgermo (KrF)
- 1990–1995: Jostein Vestre (V)
- 1995–2003: Knut Helge Harstad (V)
- 2003–2007: Sigmund Stene (V)
- 2007–2015: Thorbjørn Fylling (FrP)
- 2015–2017: Karen Simonnes Aanes (Ap)
- 2017–2019: Knut Helge Harstad (V)

== See also ==
- List of former municipalities of Norway
