= Stordal Tunnel =

Road tunnel in Fjord Municipality, Norway

Stordal Tunnel Stordalstunnelen
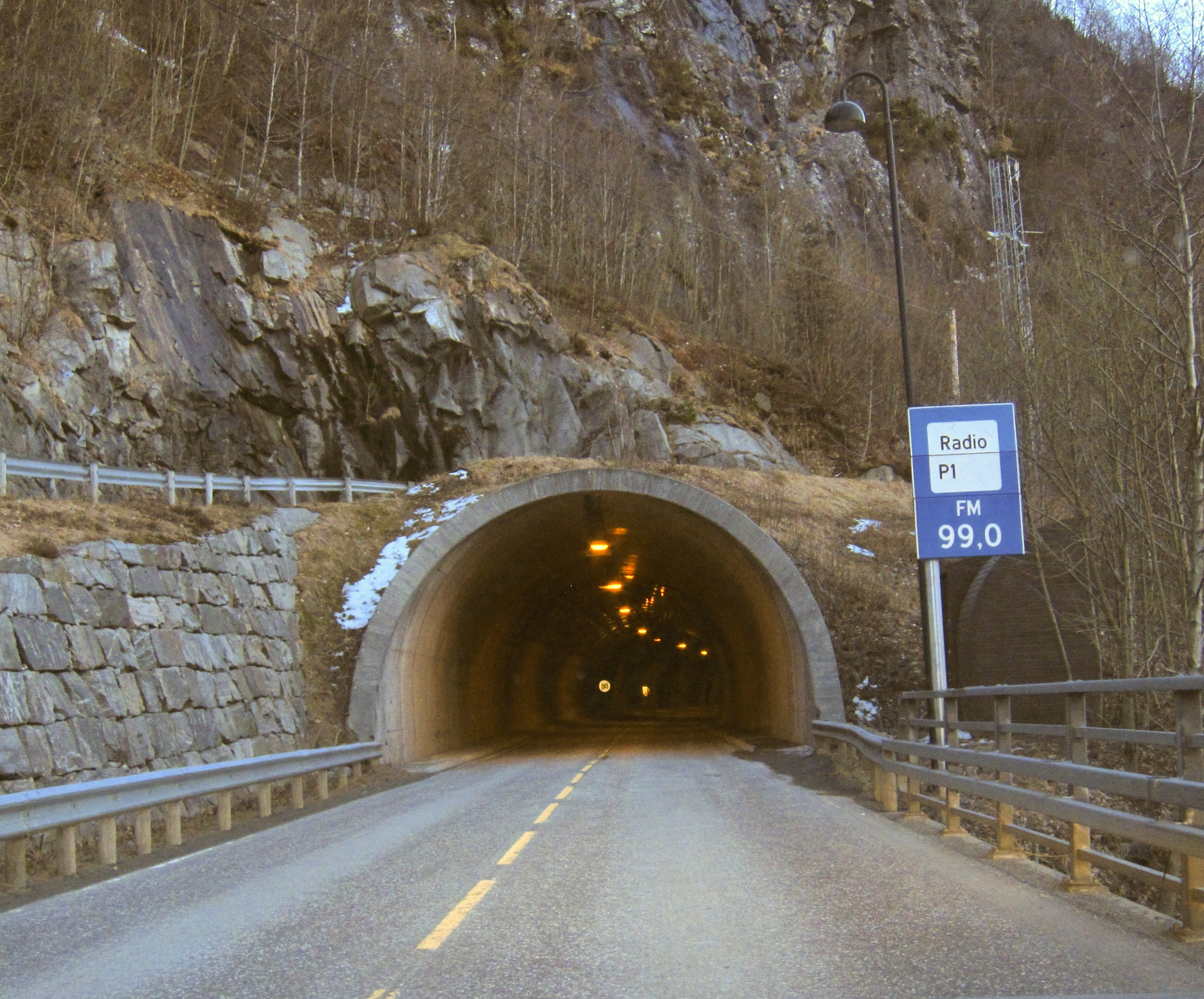
- View of the northern entrance
- Interactive map of Stordal Tunnel; Stordalstunnelen

Overview
- Location: Møre og Romsdal, Norway
- Coordinates: 62.3901°N 6.9580°E
- Status: In use
- Route: Fv650

Operation
- Opened: 27 June 1998
- Traffic: Automotive

Technical
- Length: 3,530 metres (11,580 ft)

The Stordal Tunnel (Norwegian: Stordalstunnelen) is a 3,530-metre (11,580 ft) long road tunnel in Fjord Municipality in Møre og Romsdal county, Norway. The tunnel is located on Norwegian County Road 650, on the eastern shore of the Storfjorden. The tunnel goes through the mountain Stamneshornet between the village of Dyrkorn on the north end and it exits the mountain about 1.5 kilometres (0.93 mi) northwest of the village of Stordal.

The tunnel was officially opened on 27 June 1998 by Prime Minister Kjell Magne Bondevik. The tunnel was part of a project to replace the old, narrow, avalanche-prone road that followed the shoreline of the fjord. The old road also included a short 700-metre (2,300 ft) long tunnel section. Neither the old road nor the old tunnel are used anymore since the new tunnel provides a safer and shorter drive. This is the third in a series of three tunnels connecting Sjøholt (in Ålesund Municipality) to the village of Stordal.
