= Rauma Group =

Producer of salmon

Rauma Group is a producer of salmon based in the Romsdal-region in Norway with its headquarters located at Sjøholt in Ålesund Municipality. In 2010, SalMar acquired 75% of the shares of Rauma Group for about 316 Mill NOK. Rauma Group operates as a fully integrated fish farmer, which includes all activities from roe production to processing to distribution and sales. In 2009 they had revenues of about 365 MNOK and 493 MNOK in 2010.
