= Stordal (village) =

Village in Fjord Municipality, Norway

- Village
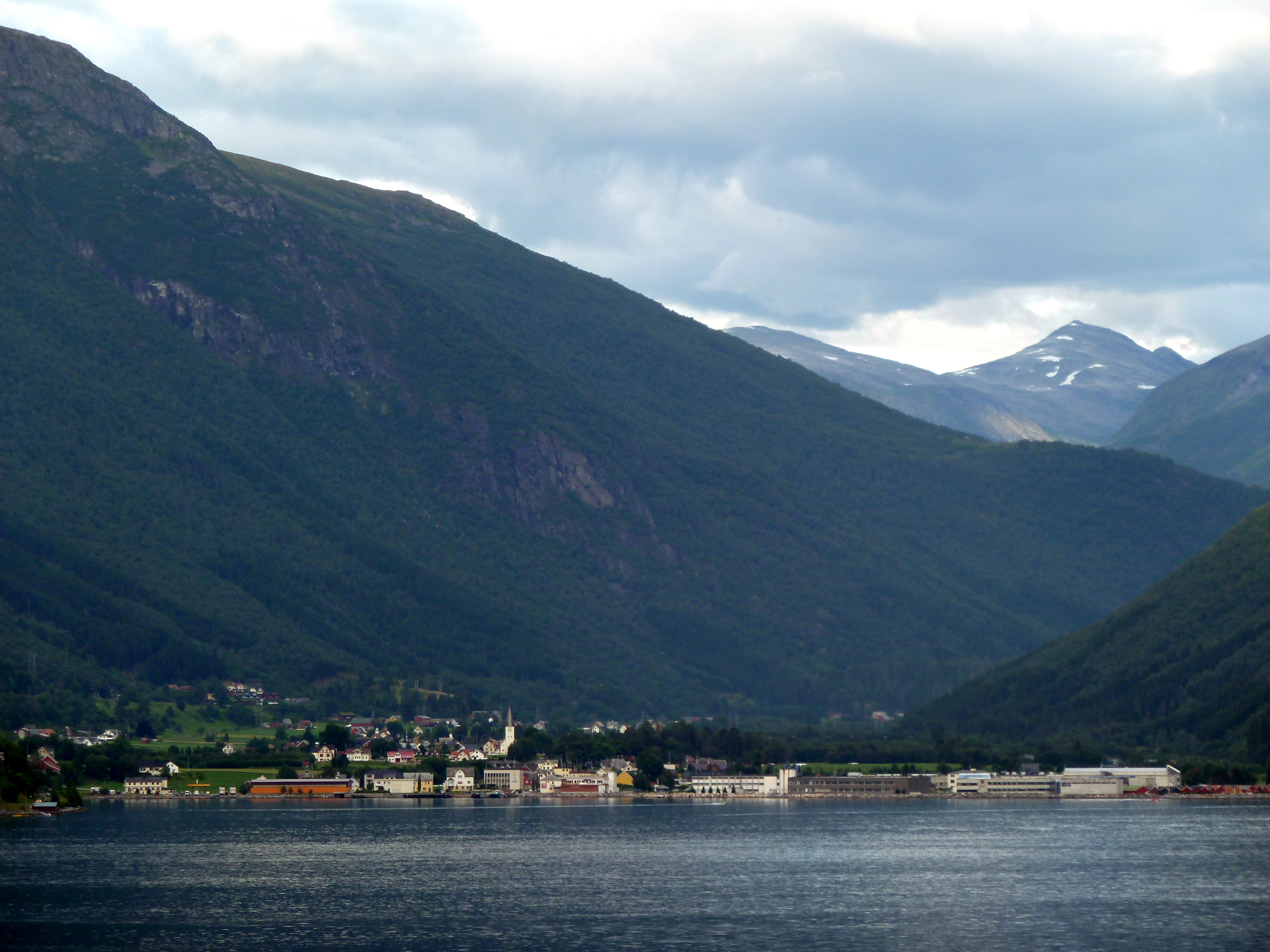
- View of the village of Stordal
- Interactive map of Stordal
- Location within Møre og Romsdal Location within Norway
- Coordinates: 62.3820°N 6.9863°E
- Country: Norway
- Region: Western Norway
- County: Møre og Romsdal
- District: Sunnmøre
- Municipality: Fjord Municipality

Area
  - Total: 0.75 km^{2} (0.29 sq mi)
- Elevation: 3 m (9.8 ft)

Population (2024)
  - Total: 584
  - Density: 779/km^{2} (2,020/sq mi)
- Time zone: UTC+01:00 (CET)
  - Summer (DST): UTC+02:00 (CEST)
- Post Code: 6250 Stordal

Stordal is the administrative centre of Fjord Municipality in Møre og Romsdal county, Norway. The village is located on the eastern shore of the Storfjorden at the mouth of the river Stordalselva. The village of Sjøholt (in neighboring Ålesund Municipality) lies about 16 kilometres (9.9 mi) north of Stordal, on the other side of the Stordal Tunnel. The historic mountain farm, Ytste Skotet, lies about 6 kilometres (3.7 mi) to the northwest, across the fjord.

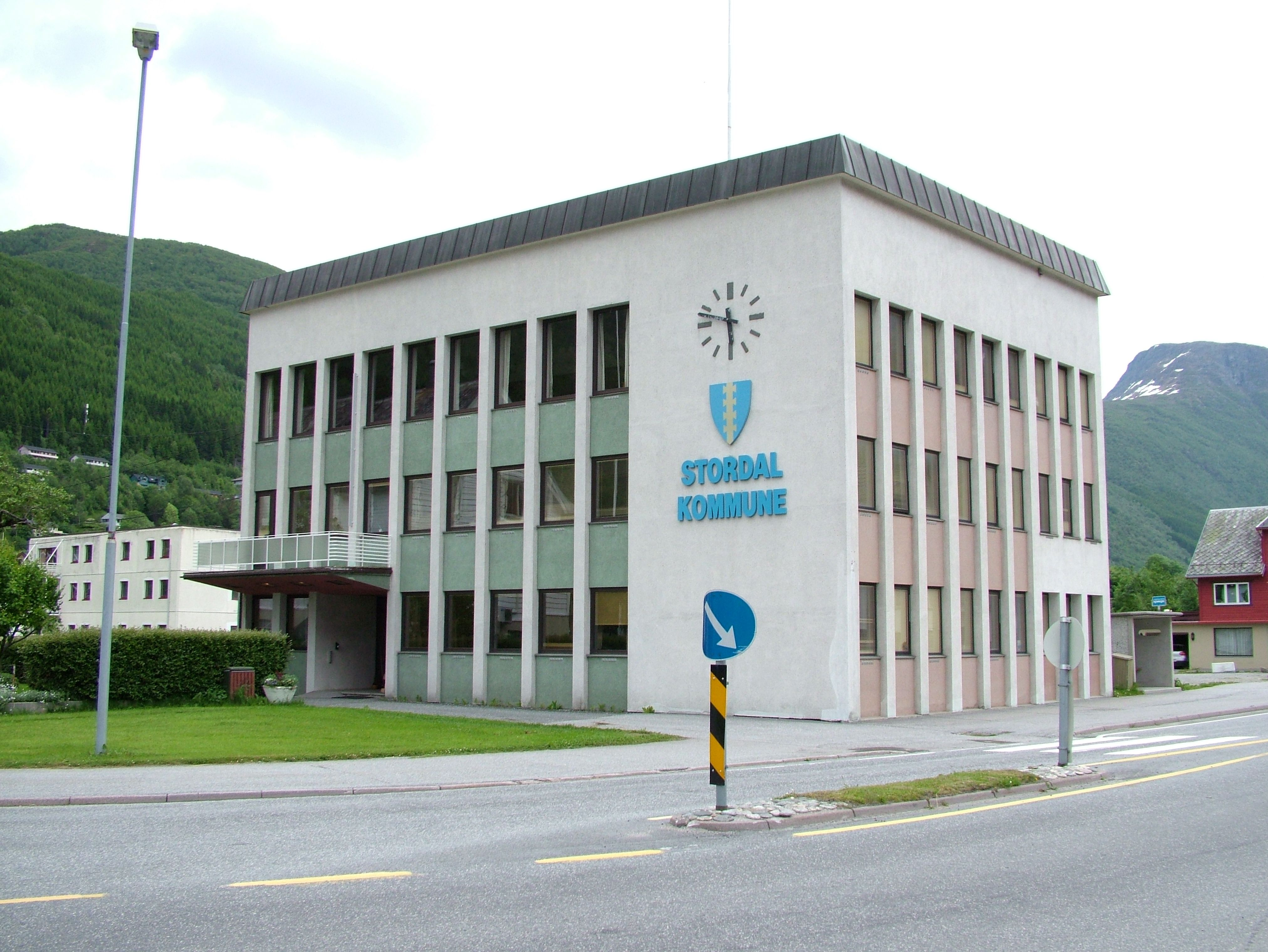
View of the municipal administration building in Stordal village

The 0.75-square-kilometre (190-acre) village has a population (2024) of 584 and a population density of 779 inhabitants per square kilometre (2,020/sq mi).

The main church for the municipality, Stordal Church is located in this village. The Old Stordal Church, now a museum, is also located here.

== History ==
The village was the administrative centre of the old Stordal Municipality during its existence. In 2020, it became the administrative centre of the new Fjord Municipality which was created after Stordal Municipality and Norddal Municipality merged.
