= Ørskog Church =

Church in Møre og Romsdal, Norway

- Ørskog kyrkje
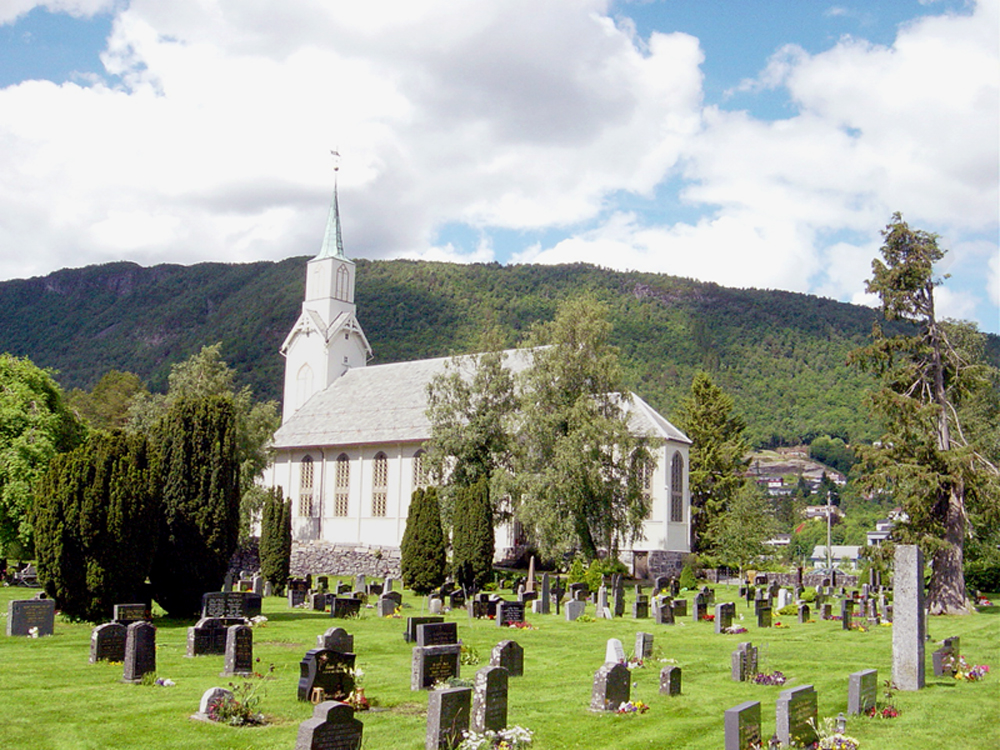
- View of the church
- Ørskog Church
- 62°28′44″N 6°48′44″E
- Location: Ålesund Municipality, Møre og Romsdal
- Country: Norway
- Denomination: Church of Norway
- Churchmanship: Evangelical Lutheran

History
- Status: Parish church
- Founded: 12th century
- Consecrated: 6 November 1873

Architecture
- Functional status: Active
- Architect: Jacob Wilhelm Nordan
- Architectural type: Long church
- Completed: 1873 (153 years ago)

Specifications
- Capacity: 600
- Materials: Wood

Administration
- Diocese: Møre bispedømme
- Deanery: Nordre Sunnmøre prosti
- Parish: Ørskog
- Norwegian Cultural Heritage Site
- Type: Church
- Status: Listed
- ID: 85909

Ørskog Church (Norwegian: Ørskog kyrkje) is a parish church of the Church of Norway in Ålesund Municipality in Møre og Romsdal county, Norway. It is located in the village of Sjøholt. It is the church for the Ørskog parish which is part of the Nordre Sunnmøre prosti (deanery) in the Diocese of Møre. The white, wooden church was built in a long church design in 1873 using plans drawn up by the architect Jacob Wilhelm Nordan. The church seats about 600 people.

== History ==
The earliest existing historical records of the church date back to 1325, but the church was not new that year. The first church in Ørskog was a wooden stave church that was located about 50 metres (160 ft) southeast of the present church site. It was likely first built during the 12th century. In 1640, the church was described as being dilapidated and inappropriately small. In 1642, a new rectangular church was constructed on the same site, very likely another stave church with a rectangular nave and a smaller, narrower chancel in the east and a church porch in the west. In the early 1700s (before 1722), the church was renovated and expanded by adding cross arms to the north and south so that the floor plan became a cruciform design. In 1806, a new church was built about 50 metres (160 ft) to the northwest of the old church. After the new building was completed, then the old church was torn down. The new church was a timber-framed octagonal building with a rectangular choir in the east and a church porch in the west.

In 1814, this church served as an election church (Norwegian: valgkirke). Together with more than 300 other parish churches across Norway, it was a polling station for elections to the 1814 Norwegian Constituent Assembly which wrote the Constitution of Norway. This was Norway's first national elections. Each church parish was a constituency that elected people called "electors" who later met together in each county to elect the representatives for the assembly that was to meet at Eidsvoll Manor later that year.

By the 1870s, the church was too small for the parish. So in 1872, the church was sold for 750 Speciedalers to the nearby Herøy Parish and moved to the village of Leikong, where it is known as Leikanger Church. After the site was cleared, a new long church was constructed in 1873 to replace the old one that was moved. This new church was consecrated on 6 November 1873 and is still in use.

== See also ==
- List of churches in Møre
