= Stranda, Møre og Romsdal =

Village in Stranda Municipality, Norway

Stranda
- Village
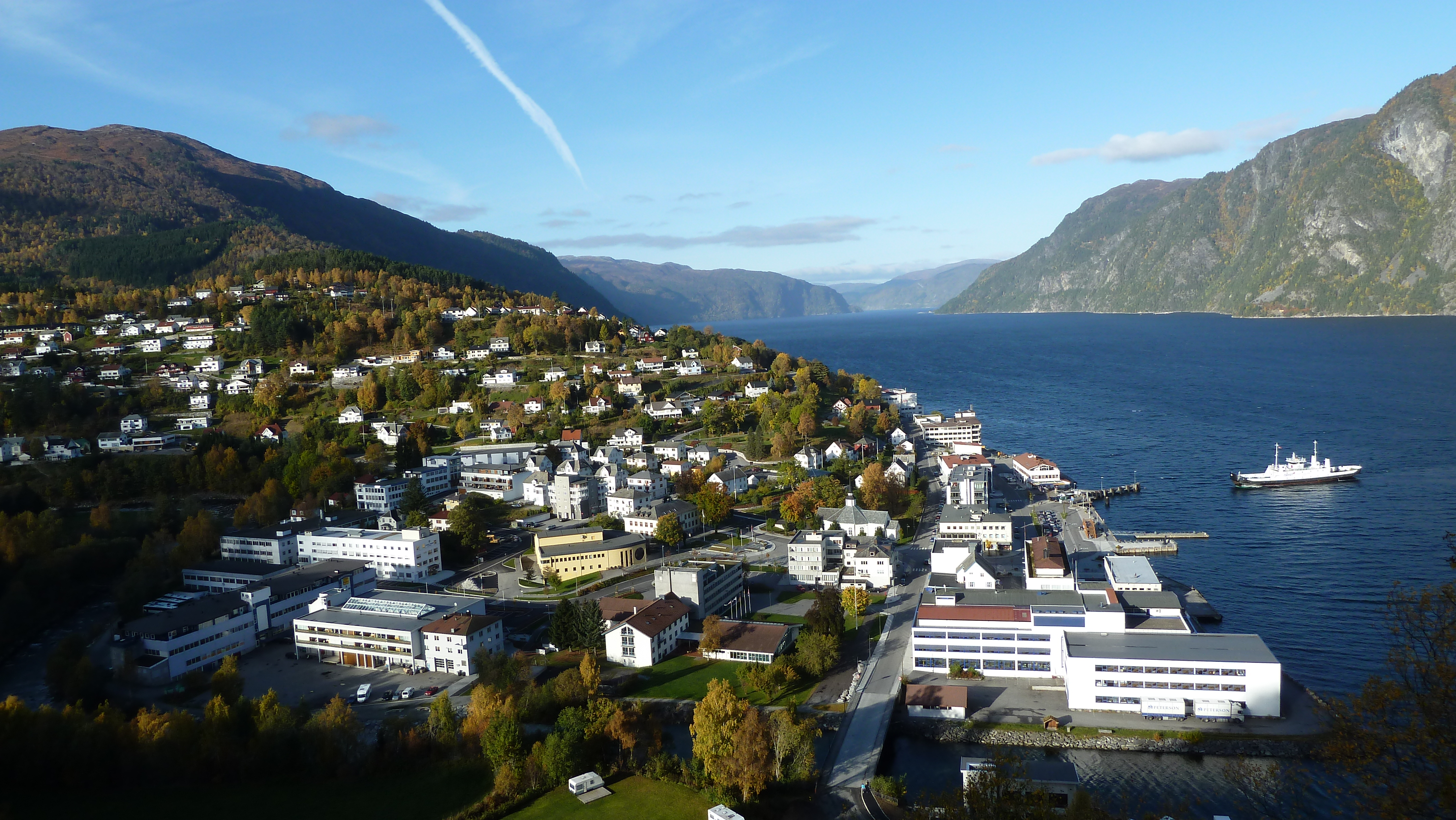
- View of the village
- Interactive map of Stranda
- Location within Møre og Romsdal Location within Norway
- Coordinates: 62.3086°N 6.9372°E
- Country: Norway
- Region: Western Norway
- County: Møre og Romsdal
- District: Sunnmøre
- Municipality: Stranda Municipality

Area
  - Total: 2.19 km^{2} (0.85 sq mi)
- Elevation: 30 m (98 ft)

Population (2024)
  - Total: 2,571
  - Density: 1,174/km^{2} (3,040/sq mi)
- Time zone: UTC+01:00 (CET)
  - Summer (DST): UTC+02:00 (CEST)
- Post Code: 6200 Stranda

Stranda is the administrative centre of Stranda Municipality in Møre og Romsdal county, Norway. The village is located on the western shore of the Storfjorden.

The 2.19-square-kilometre (540-acre) village has a population (2024) of 2,571 and a population density of 1,174 inhabitants per square kilometre (3,040/sq mi). This is the largest urban area in the municipality.

The village is the shopping and industry center of the municipality. It lies along Norwegian County Road 60, and there is a ferry connection to the village of Liabygda, across the fjord. The village of Helsem lies about 2 kilometres (1.2 mi) south of Stranda. Stranda Church is located in Stranda. The newspaper Sunnmøringen is published in Stranda.

== History ==
At 10:00 p.m. on 8 January 1731, a landslide with an estimated volume of 6,000,000 cubic metres (7,800,000 cubic yards) fell from a height of 500 metres (1,600 ft) on the slope of the mountain Skafjell into the Storfjorden opposite the village of Stranda. The slide generated a megatsunami 30 metres (98 ft) in height that struck Stranda, flooding the area for 100 metres (328 ft) inland and destroying the church and all but two boathouses, as well as many boats. Damaging waves struck as far away as Ørskog Municipality. The waves killed 17 people. It was the first natural disaster in Norway to be reported and documented in historic time.
