= Storfjorden (Sunnmøre) =

Fjord in Sunnmøre, Norway

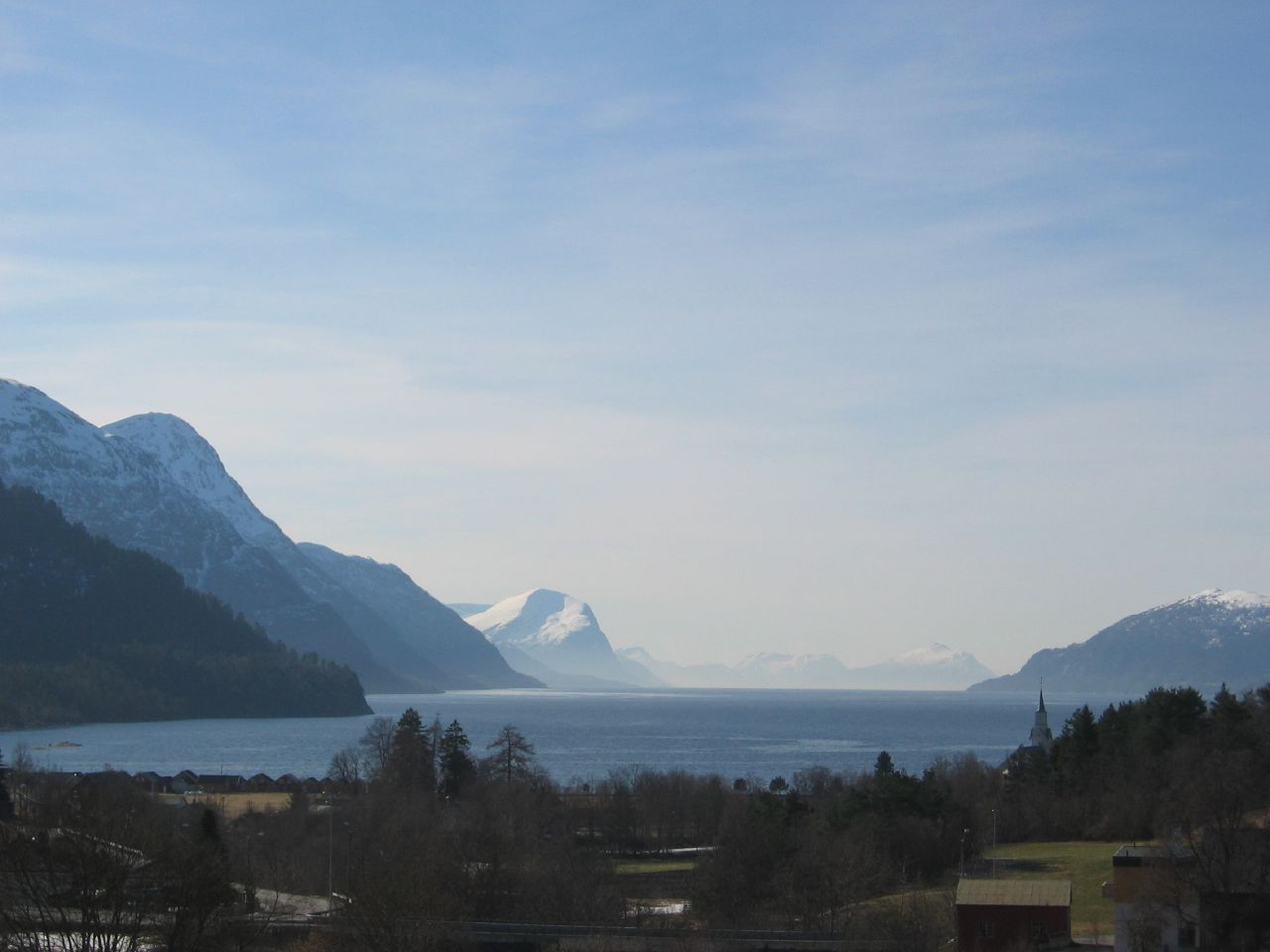
- View of outer section of the fjord, looking west
- Interactive map of the fjord
- Location: Møre og Romsdal county, Norway
- Coordinates: 62.1537°N 6.5776°E
- Type: Fjord
- Primary outflows: Sulafjorden
- Basin countries: Norway
- Max. length: 110 kilometres (68 mi)
- Max. depth: −679 metres (−2,228 ft)

Storfjorden (or Storfjord) is a 110-kilometre (68 mi) long fjord in the Sunnmøre region of Møre og Romsdal county, Norway. It stretches from the village of Hareid in the west to the villages of Tafjord and Geiranger in the east. The Storfjorden system branches off into several smaller fjords including the famous Geirangerfjord and Tafjorden. At the village of Stranda, the main fjord branches off into the Sunnylvsfjorden-Geirangerfjorden to the west and the Norddalsfjorden-Tafjorden to the east.

The name literally means the "big" or "great" fjord, indicating that this is a long fjord and it is, in fact, the main fjord in this region. Stretching about 110 kilometres (68 mi), Storfjord is the 5th longest fjord in Norway. The Storfjord is a dominant topographical feature in the Sunnmøre region as it cuts the region in two parts that are only connected by ferry. The deepest point in the fjord is 679 metres (2,228 ft) near the village of Dyrkorn in Fjord Municipality.

The landscape around Storfjorden is typical for Western Norway. The mouth of the fjord is surrounded by islands with mountains reaching 500 to 800 metres (1,600 to 2,600 ft) above sea level. Further to the east there are higher mountains. At the villages of Tafjord and Geiranger, the mountains climb to about 1,500 to 1,800 metres (4,900 to 5,900 ft) above sea level. Most of the Storfjorden has characteristically steep or very steep shores, interrupted by several gentle valleys stretching up to 30 kilometres (19 mi) into the hinterland. In this way, the Storfjorden system is, along with the Nordfjorden, Sognefjorden, and Hardangerfjorden fjord-systems, the major samples of the typical west coast fjords highly praised by visitors.

On the steep shores of the fjord, there are several historic mountain farms such as Ytste Skotet in Fjord Municipality and Me-Åkernes, Skageflå, and Knivsflå in Stranda Municipality.

== Branches and sections ==
From the coast to the inland

- Mouth (the fjord flows out into two other fjords)
  - Sulafjorden
  - Vartdalsfjorden
- Outer Storfjorden (there are two major branches off the fjord in this area)
  - Hjørundfjorden (which branches into the Norangsfjorden and Storfjorden)
  - Sykkylvsfjorden
- Inner Storfjorden (there are two major branches off the fjord in this area)
  - Norddalsfjorden (16 kilometres or 9.9 miles), which flows into the Tafjorden (8 kilometres or 5.0 miles)
  - Sunnylvsfjorden (26 kilometres or 16 miles), which flows into the Geirangerfjorden (15 kilometres or 9.3 miles)

== Municipalities and villages ==
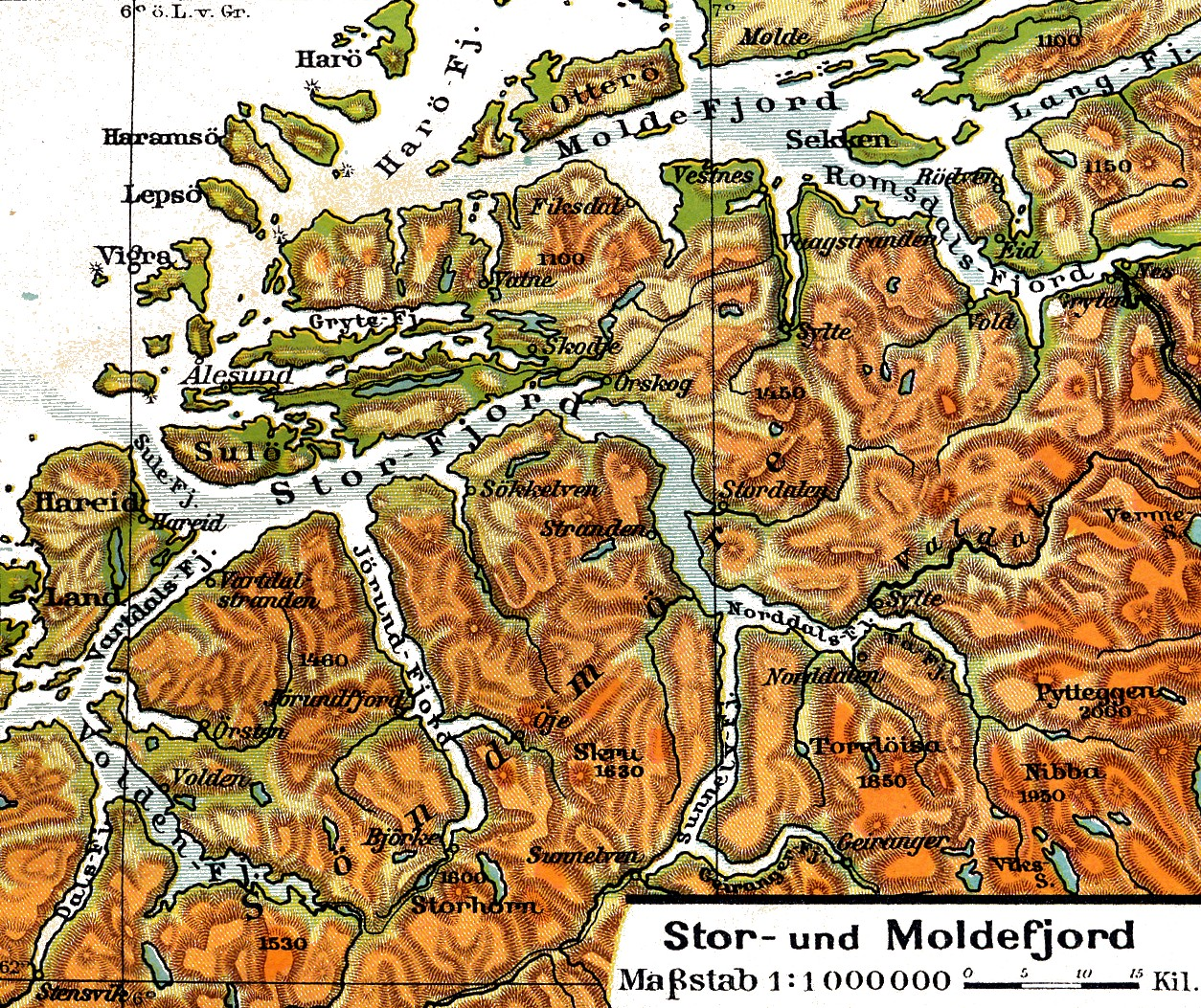
Map of the fjord

This is a list of settlements along the fjord

- Sula Municipality
  - Leirvågen
- Ålesund Municipality
  - Vegsundet, Emleim, Valle, Sjøholt
- Sykkylven Municipality
  - Aure, Ikornnes
- Stranda Municipality
  - Stranda, Liabygda, Geiranger, Hellesylt
- Fjord Municipality
  - Stordal, Valldal/Sylte, Eidsdal, Norddal, Tafjord

== Transportation ==
Several car ferries cross the fjord, but there are no bridges or tunnels. The proposed Storfjord Bridge may one day cross the fjord, but it is cost prohibitive at this time. Here is a list of the ferry crossings:

- Hareid-Sulesund from Hareidlandet in Hareid Municipality to Sula island in Sula Municipality across the Sulafjorden
- Leirvågen-Festøya-Hundeidvik (a 3-point ferry crossing) from Leirvågen on Sula island across the Storfjorden to Festøya in Ørsta Municipality then on to Hundeidvik across the Hjørundfjorden in Sykkylven Municipality
- Leknes-Sæbø across the Hjørundfjorden
- Ørsneset-Magerholm from Ørsneset in Sykkylven Municipality to Magerholm in Ålesund Municipality, part of Norwegian County Road 60
- Stranda-Liabygda from the village of Stranda in the west to Liabygda in the east, Norwegian County Road 650
- Eidsdal-Linge across the Norddalsfjorden, part of Norwegian County Road 63
- Geiranger-Hellesylt a tourist route along the Geirangerfjord, only operates in the summer

Due to the steep slopes along the shores, road construction is challenging and overland road transport is often limited to valleys. On the northern shore of the Storfjorden, there a continuous network of roads from Tafjord to the island of Sula using the roads 63, 650, E39, 656, 60 and 61. On the southern shore, there are only short sections of roads along the fjord itself.

During summer the Hurtigruten line visits the Storfjorden and Geirangerfjorden regularly.

== Landslide and megatsunami ==
At 10:00 p.m. on 8 January 1731, a landslide with an estimated volume of 6,000,000 cubic metres (7,800,000 cubic yards) fell from a height of 500 metres (1,600 ft) on the slope of the mountain Skafjell into the Storfjorden opposite Stranda. The slide generated a megatsunami 30 metres (98 ft) in height that struck Stranda, flooding the area for 100 metres (328 ft) inland and destroying the church and all but two boathouses, as well as many boats. Damaging waves struck as far as way as Ørskog Municipality. The waves killed 17 people. It was the first natural disaster in Norway to be reported and documented in historic time.

== Gallery ==
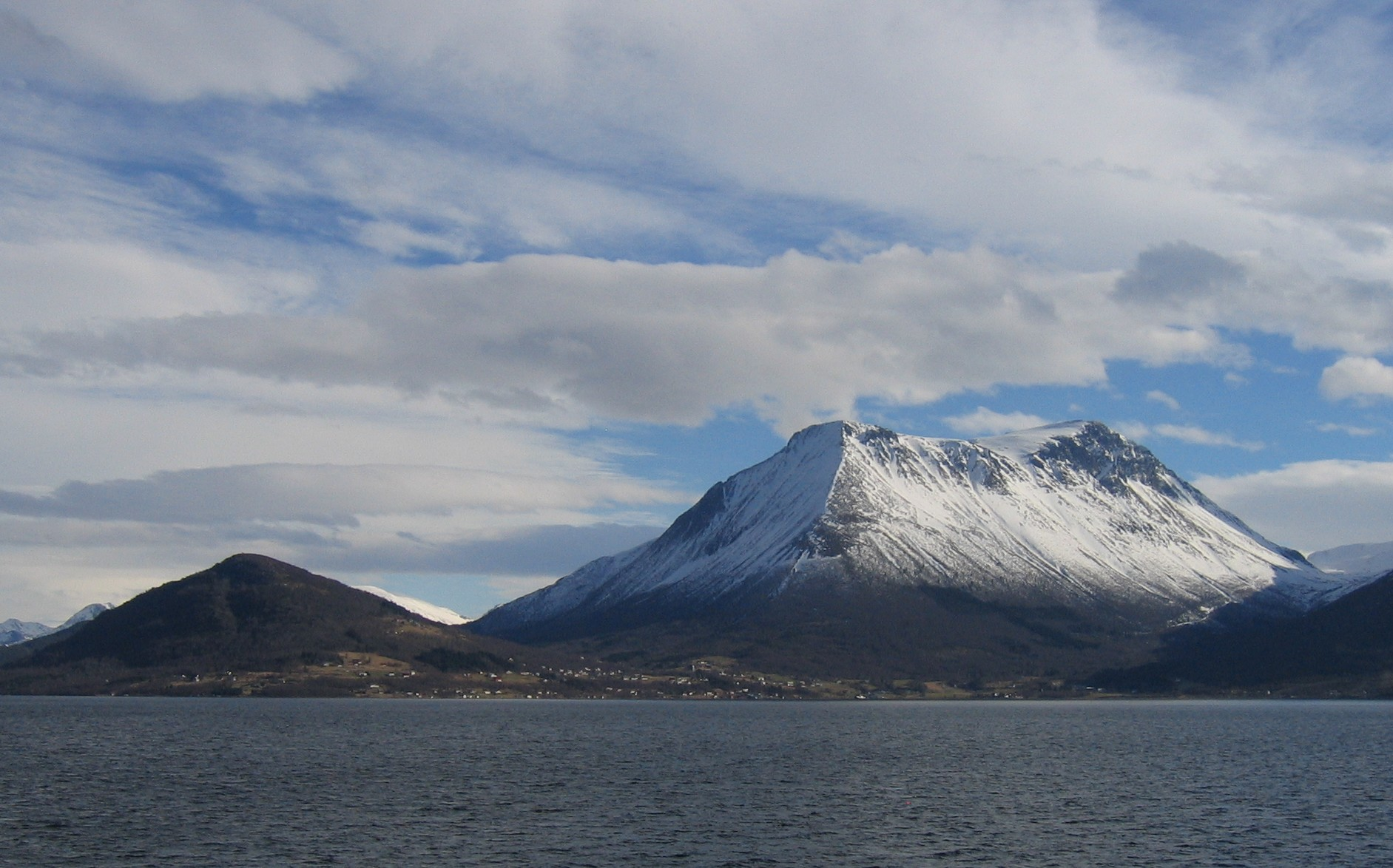
Mountains at Sykkylven seen from Storfjorden

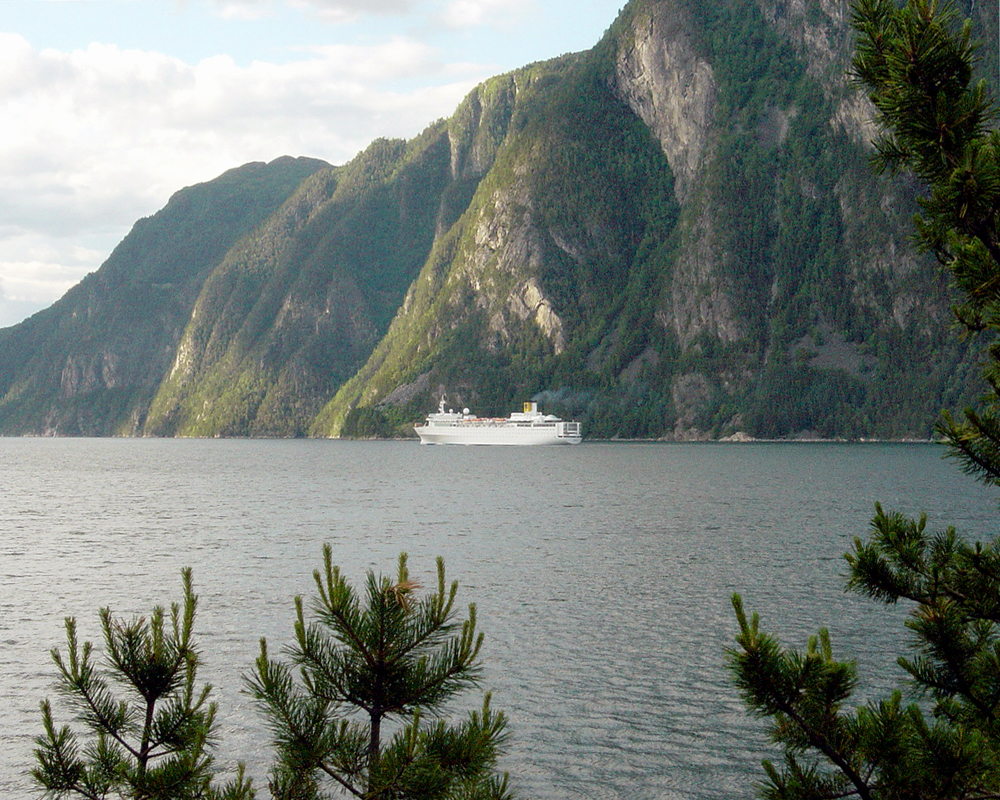
Cruise ship on Storfjorden seen from Stranda

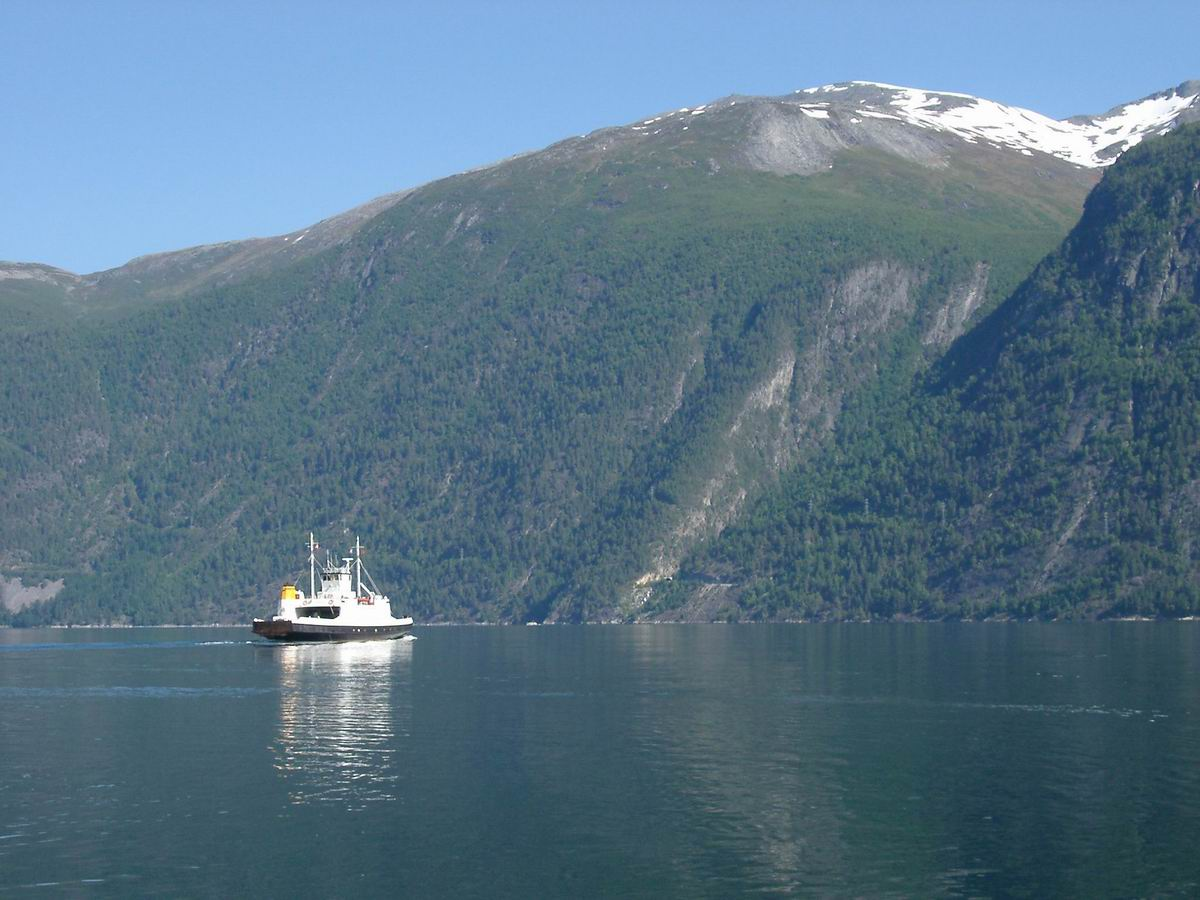
Ferry Eidsdal-Linge, inner section

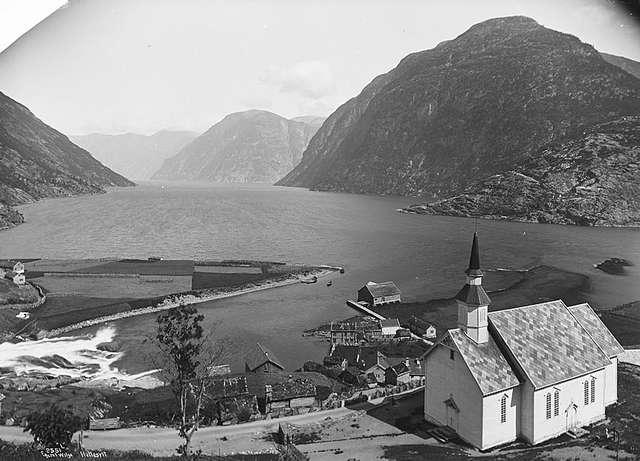
Sunnylven Church and Hellesylt village, at Sunnylvsfjorden (photo approx 1890)

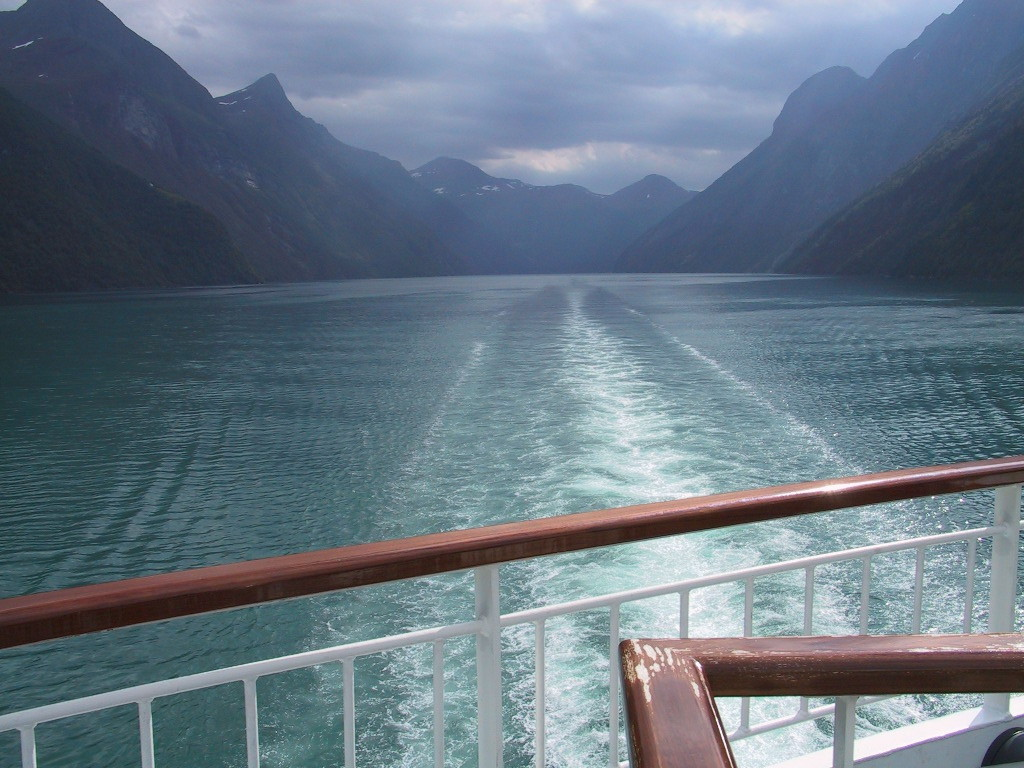
On Geirangerfjord

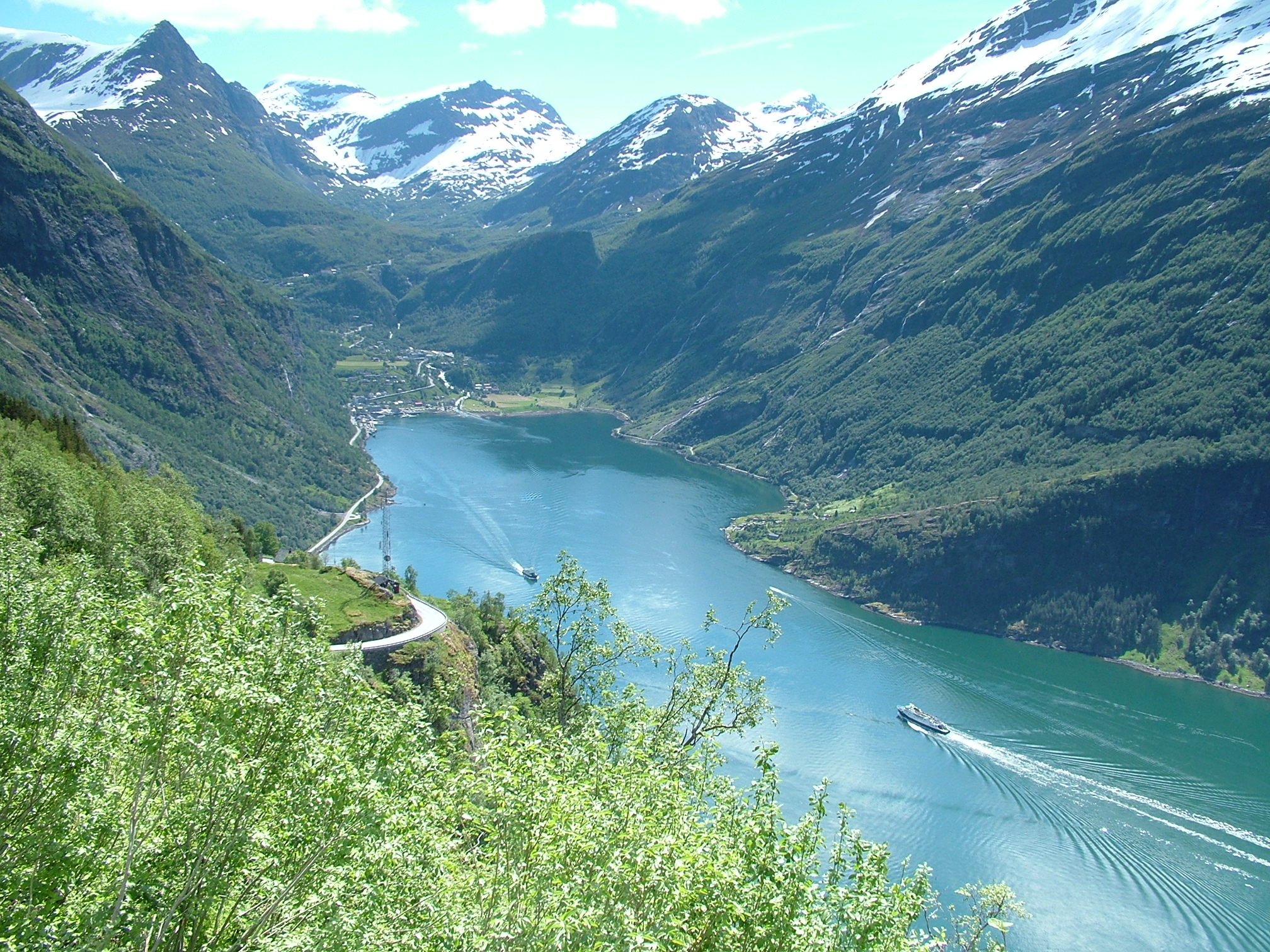
Geirangerfjord and Geiranger village
