= Ytste Skotet =

Historical farm in Møre og Romsdal, Norway

Ytste Skotet Skotet
- Village
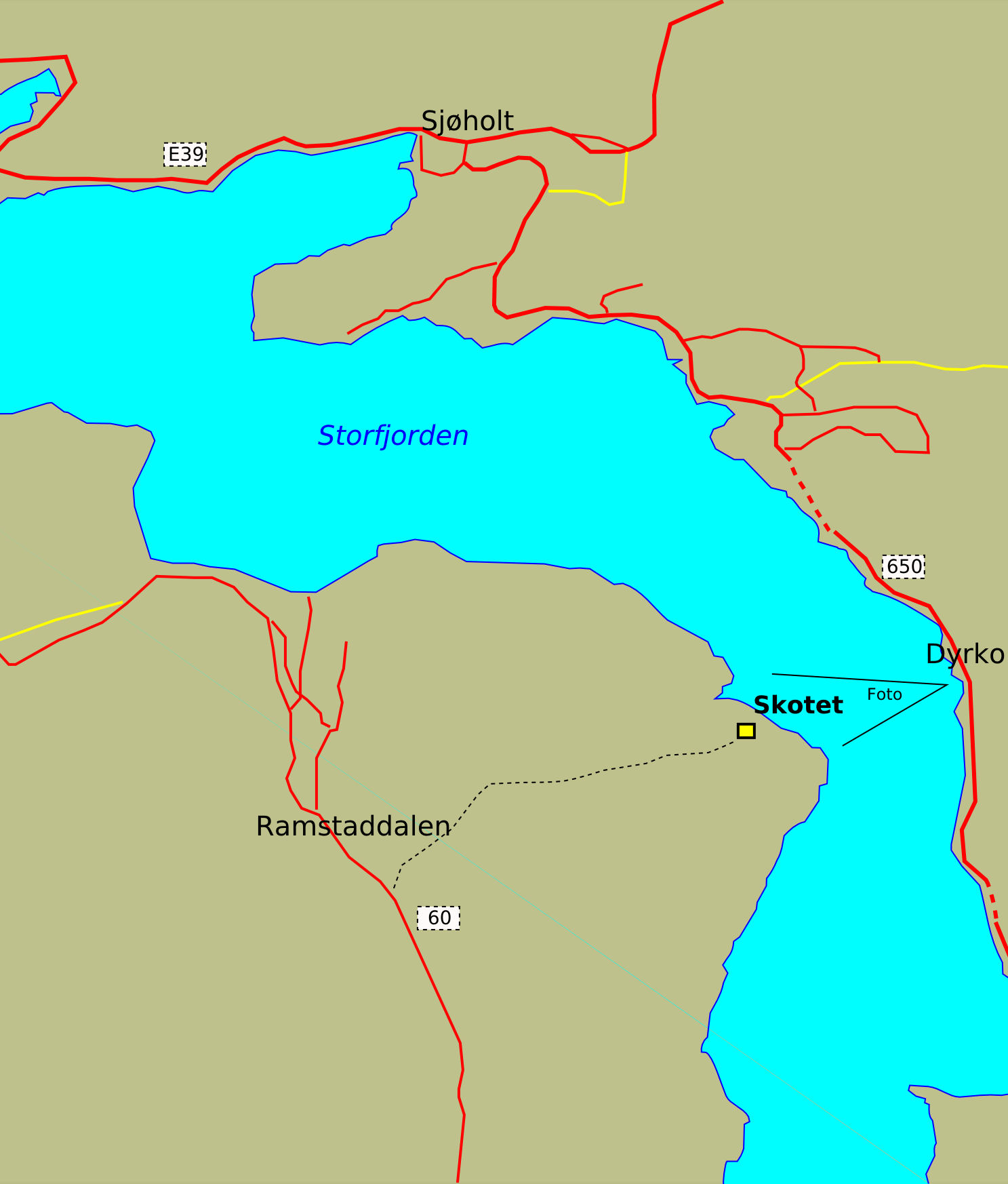
- Map of the Ytste Skotet along the Storfjorden
- Interactive map of Ytste Skotet
- Location within Møre og Romsdal Location within Norway
- Coordinates: 62.41483°N 6.89442°E
- Country: Norway
- Region: Western Norway
- County: Møre og Romsdal
- District: Sunnmøre
- Municipality: Fjord Municipality
- Elevation: 215 m (705 ft)
- Time zone: UTC+01:00 (CET)
  - Summer (DST): UTC+02:00 (CEST)
- Post Code: 6250 Stordal

Ytste Skotet is a complete, preserved, historical farm located in Fjord Municipality in Møre og Romsdal county, Norway. The historic farmyard and museum, which is part of the Sunnmøre Museum Foundation, is located on the steep shores of the Storfjorden in the Sunnmøre district of the county. The farm is located across the fjord from the village of Dyrkorn. The Storfjordens Venner association owns Ytste Skotet and has orchestrated the restoration of the farm. The foundation Ytste Skotet administers the farm's operation and maintenance, employs workers, and serves as general manager.

== Operation ==
The farm is well preserved and maintained. It is a typical pre-industrial operation that remained in use until modern times; the activities still shown here are representative of the old ways of the mountain-and-fjord farms along the Storfjorden. The fishing in the fjord was an important contribution to the farm household economy. The mountain dairy farm (or støl) was still in use, but in the most recent years the cheese was made at the farm rather than at the støl. The farm grew barley and oats and had timber sufficient for their own use. To get enough fodder, they harvested hay in the outlying fields; the hay was stored in outlying barns and transported home on a sledge when appropriate snow conditions existed. The buildings and the cultivated landscape, as preserved, reflect this way of operating the farm.

== History ==
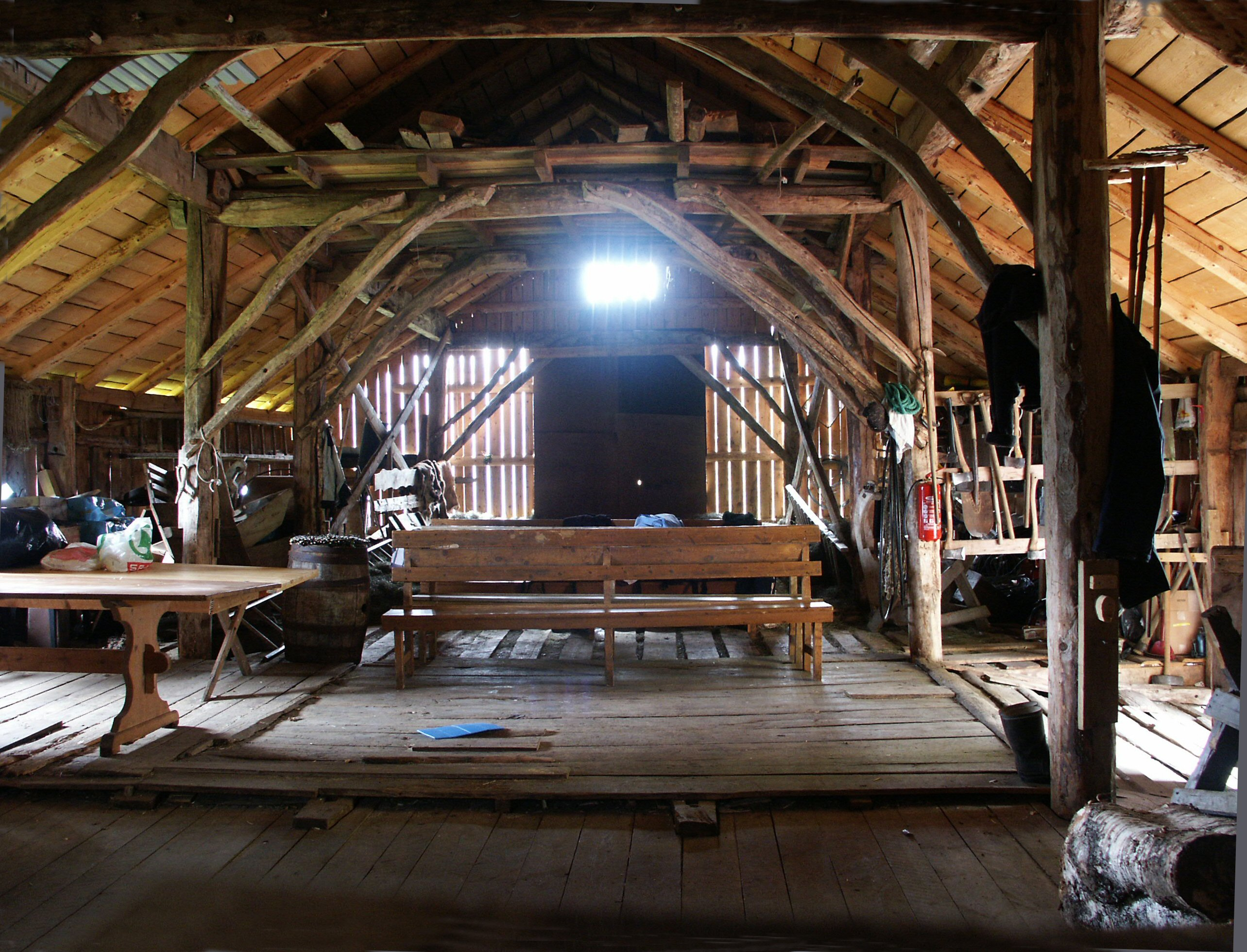
Ytste Skotet Barn. The frame construction is similar to Bronze Age post barns, but more modern since the frames were put together on the ground and erected on site.

The place is mentioned in Middle Ages sources such as the Flateyarbok, Formannsogur, and Heimskringla. Tradition as documented in the sagas tells that there was a farm by this name at this location in the days of King Håkon the Good (i.e., the 10th century). After the serious depopulation of the region resulting from the Black Death in the late 1340s, the farm was again mentioned in historic records in 1606. There are also undocumented sites of constructions which have been identified on the farm.

Ane Karoline Vidhammar was the last farmer at Ytste Skotet; she operated the farm with her son, Knut Olav, and her daughter, Jenny Olea, until the farm was vacated in 1954. The place lay fallow until 1989 when the property, comprising 750 acres (3.0 km^{2}), was assigned to the Storfjordens Venner (lit. 'The Friends of the Great Fjord') foundation, which has rehabilitated the buildings and the cultivated landscape. The place has been restored to represent it as it existed when the farm was last in operation.

=== Name ===
Ytste Skotet is one of three related farms. The other two are Me-Skotet (me is local dialect for "middle") and Inste Skotet (inste is local dialect for innermost). The name Skotet (pronounced: Skøt-e where "ø" sounds like the "u" in "curling" and the "e" like the "o" in fjord) signifies a high elevation projecting point of land.

== Future ==
Norsk Kulturråd, the Culture Council of Norway, has selected Ytste Skotet to be one of nine projects in Norway working under the motto "Children, youngsters, and museums". The farm has become a pilot project and the very preservation assumes continuation of the old ways of operating. In the summer season, the foundation receives schools and visitors and keeps courses with possibilities for serving and accommodation.

== Access ==
- Easiest access is by boat from Dyrkorn
- One may also access the farm in a couple of hours by foot traveling over the mountain from Ramstaddalen in Sykkylven Municipality.

== Media gallery ==
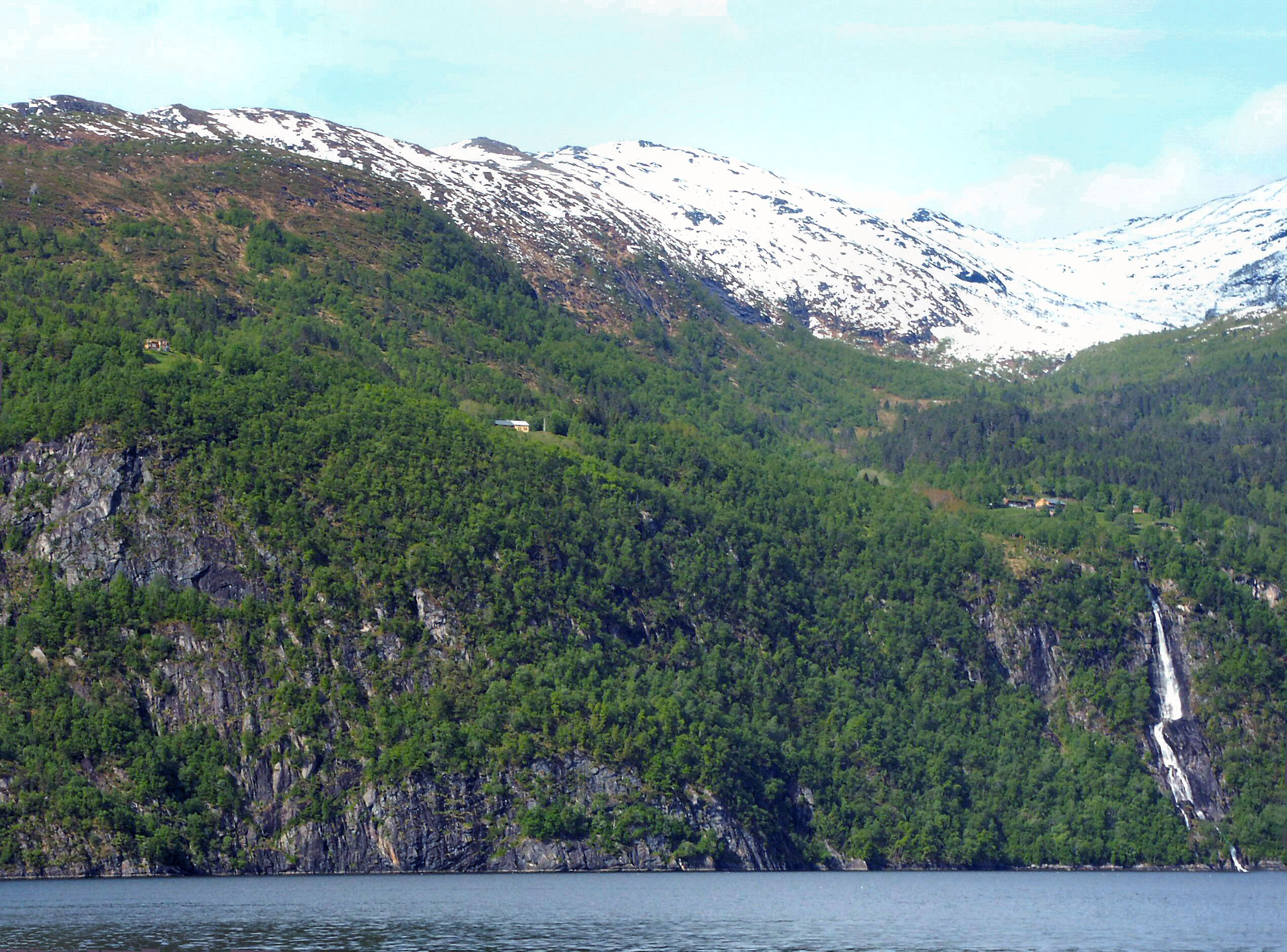
View towards Skotet. Ytste Skotet at the right, Meskotet to the left of the middle and Inste Skotet outermost left.

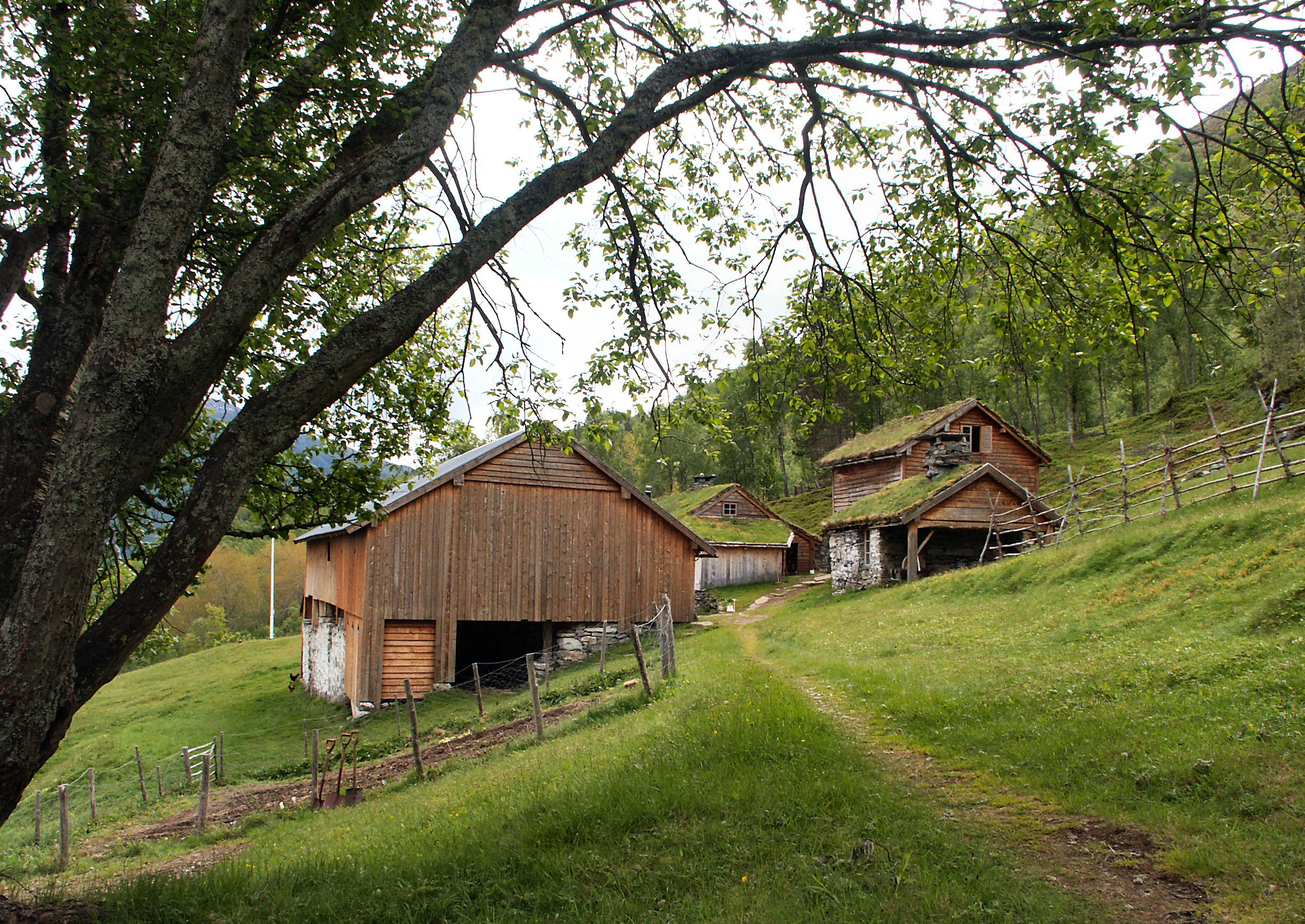
Ytste Skotet

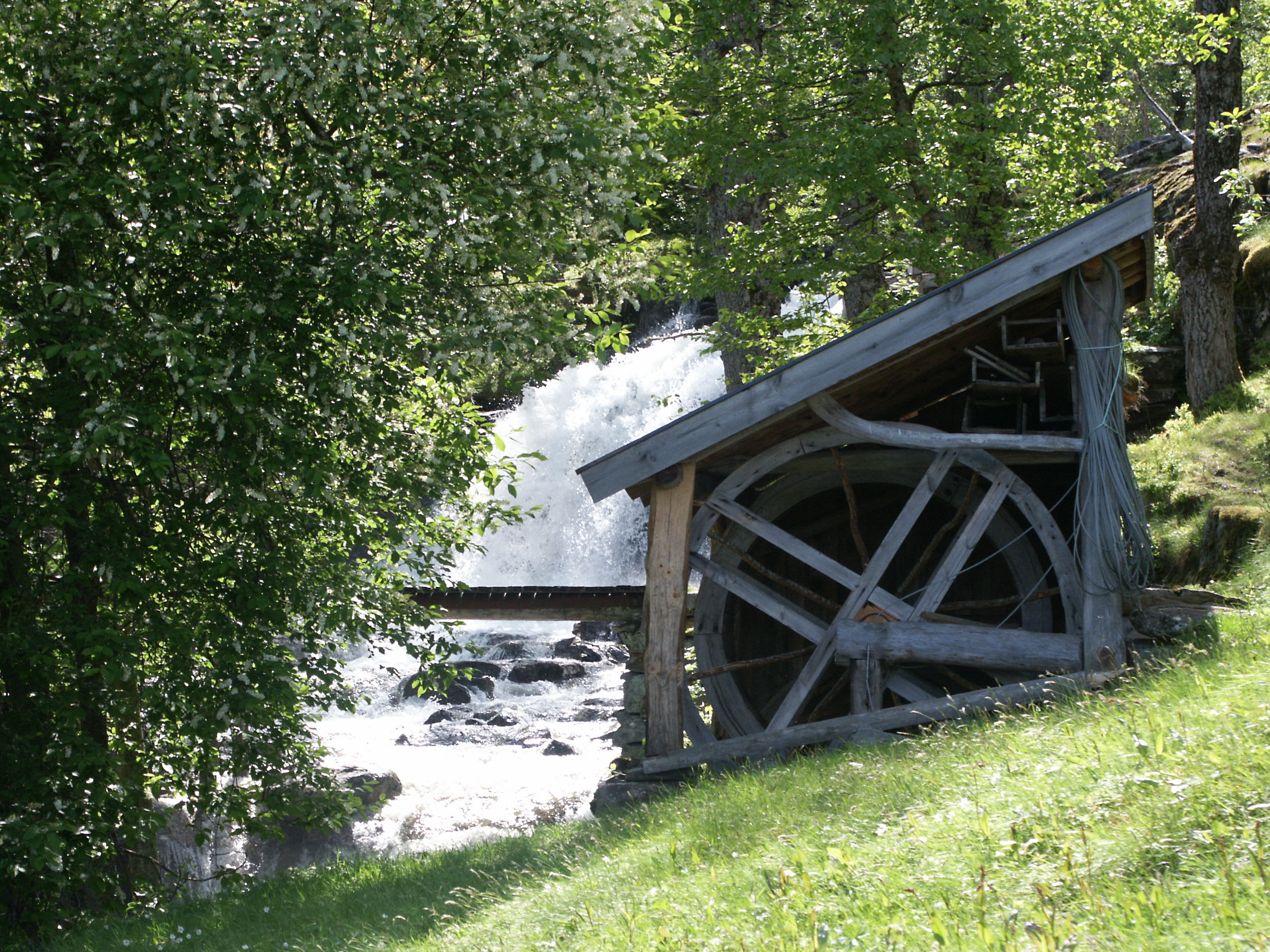
Breastshot water wheel which powered the wood splitting machine in the barn at the farm.

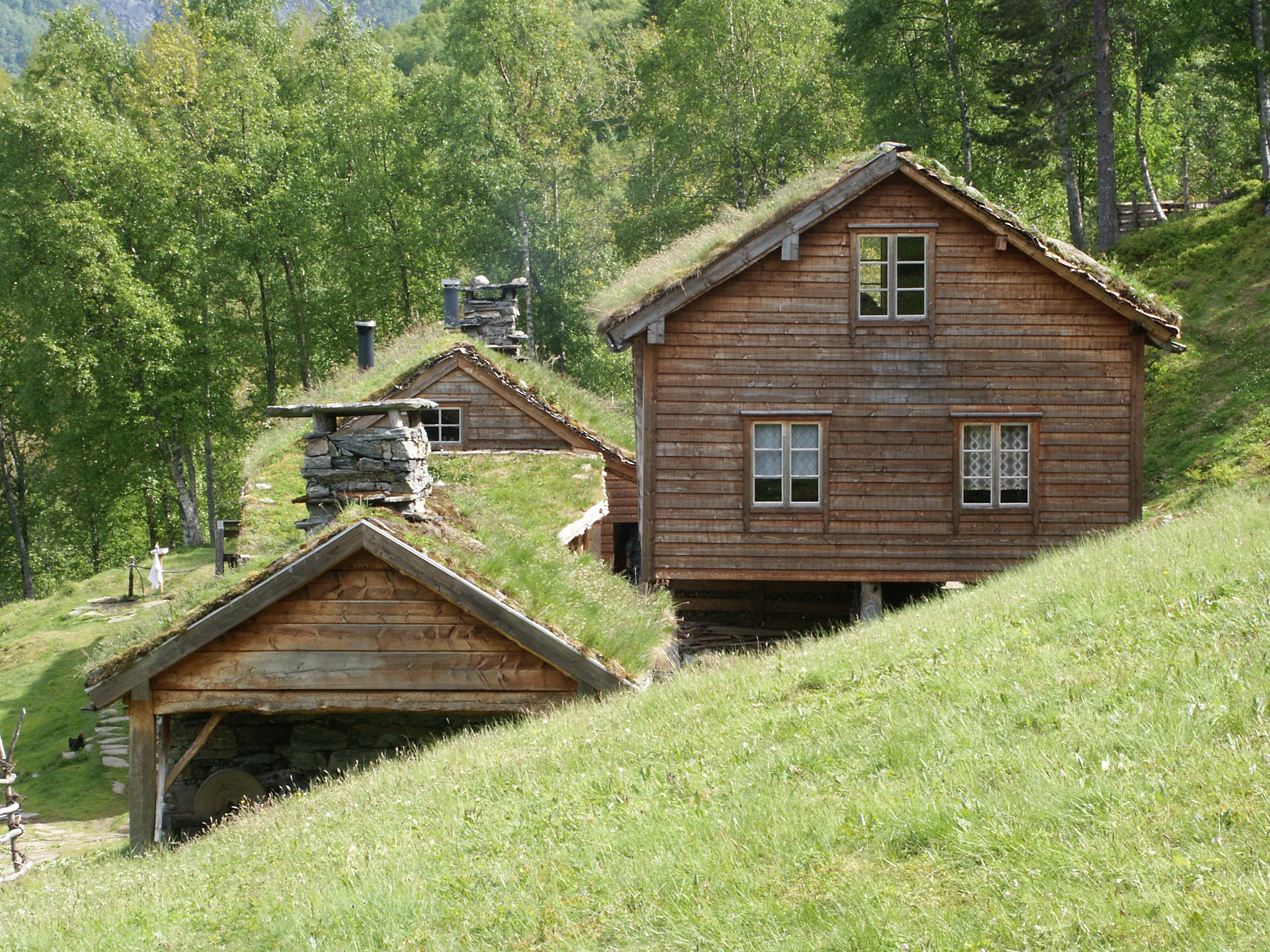
Ytste Skotet

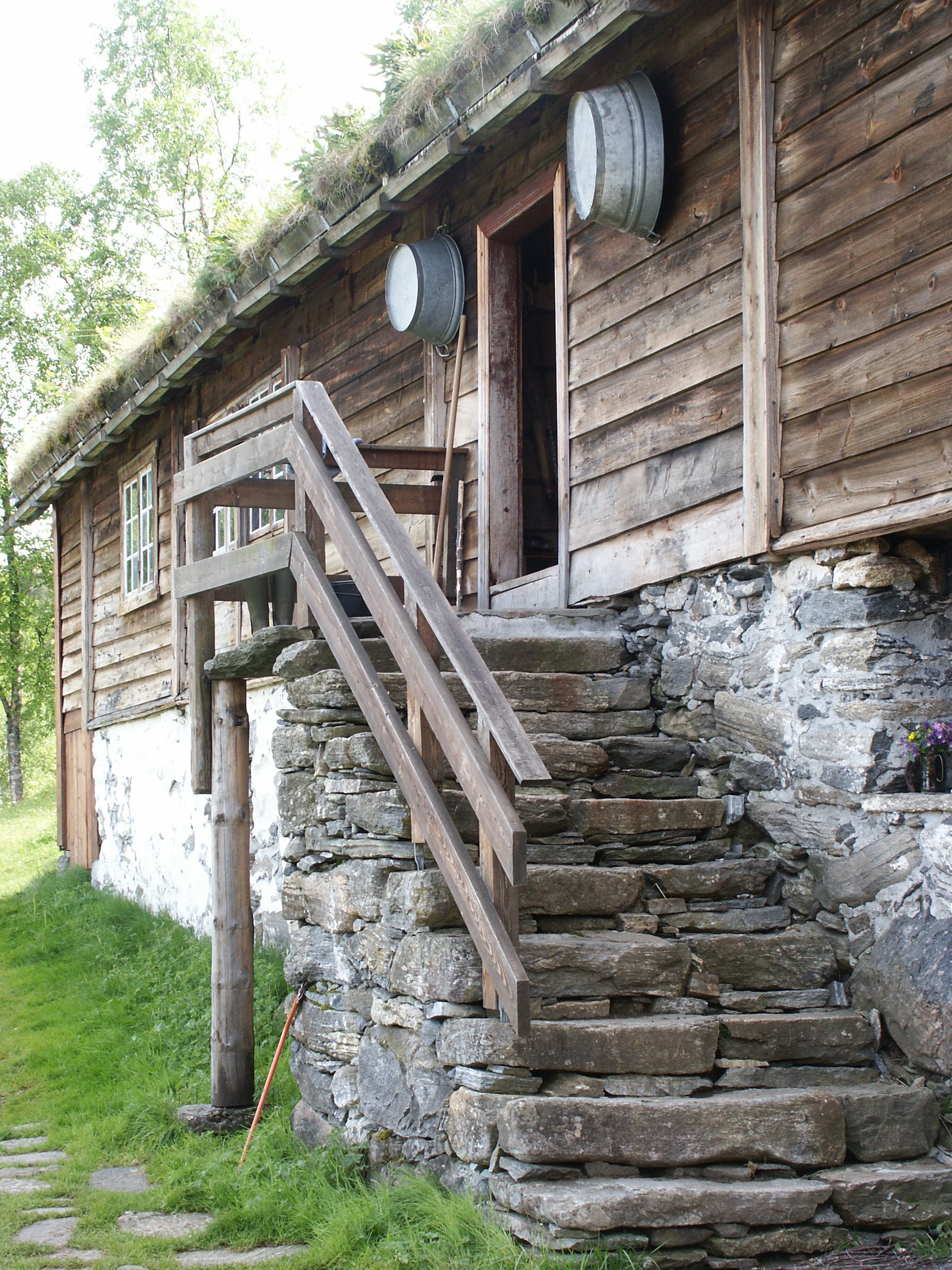
The main house

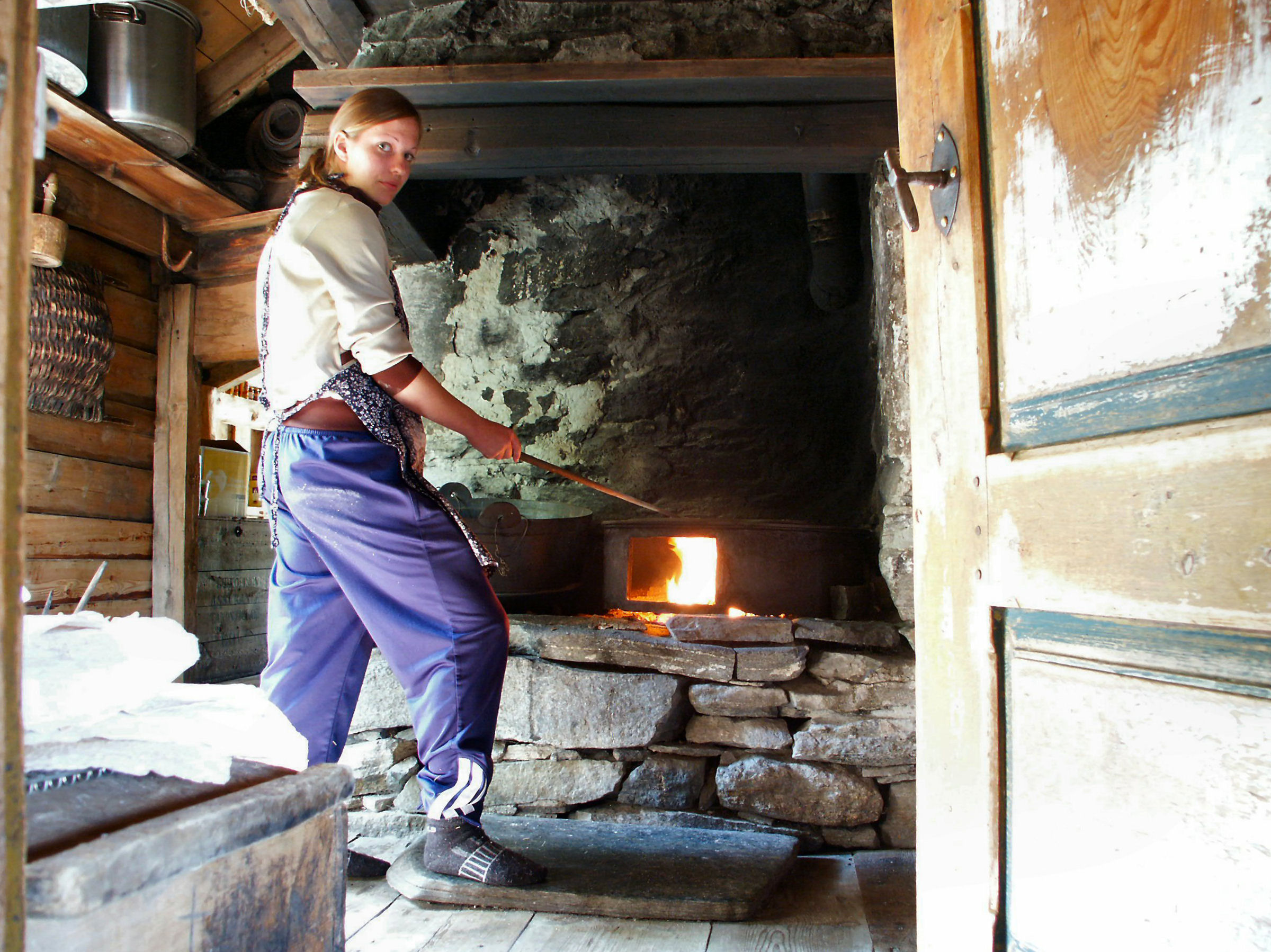
Baking crispbread in the kitchen

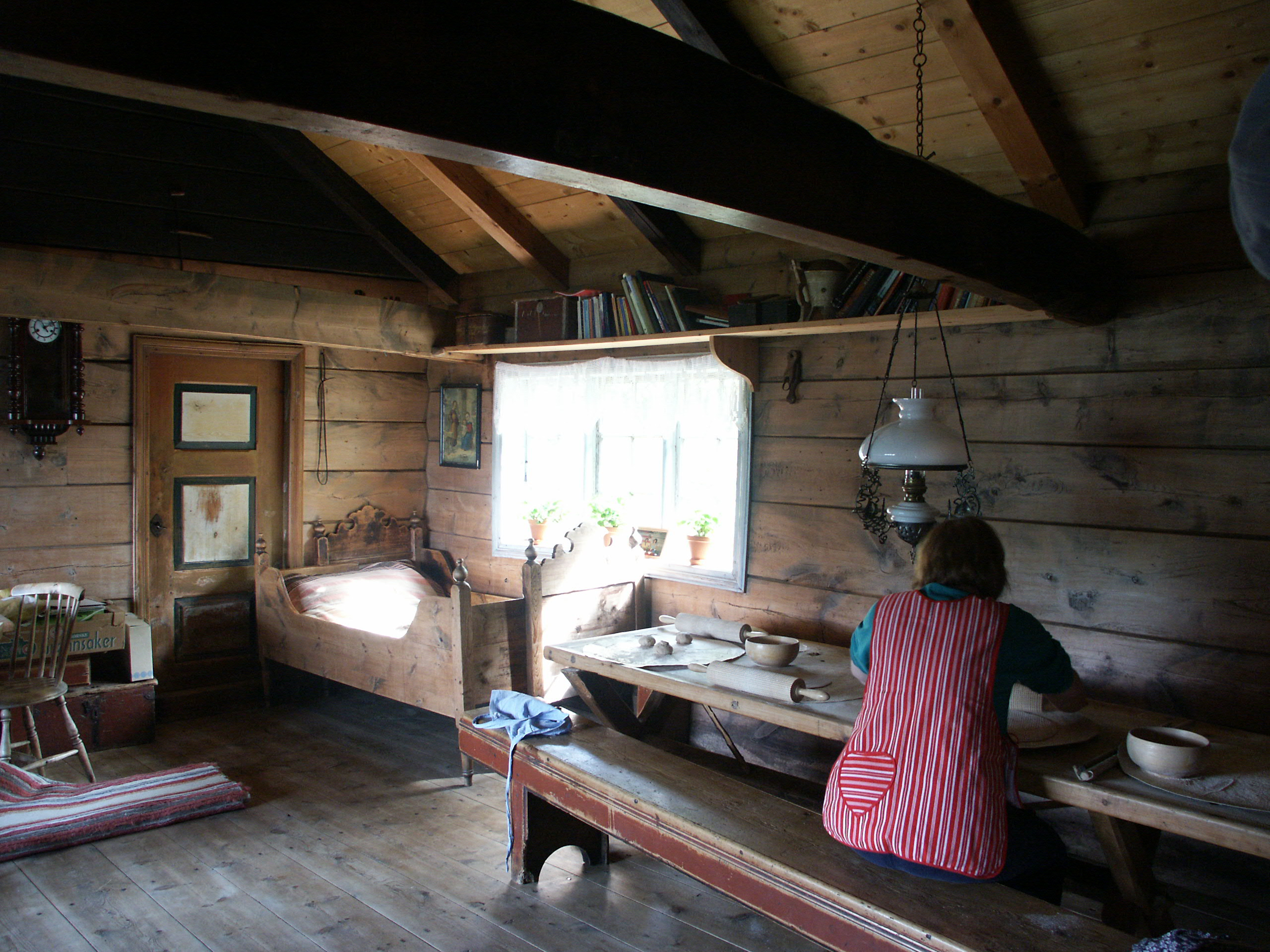
Living room

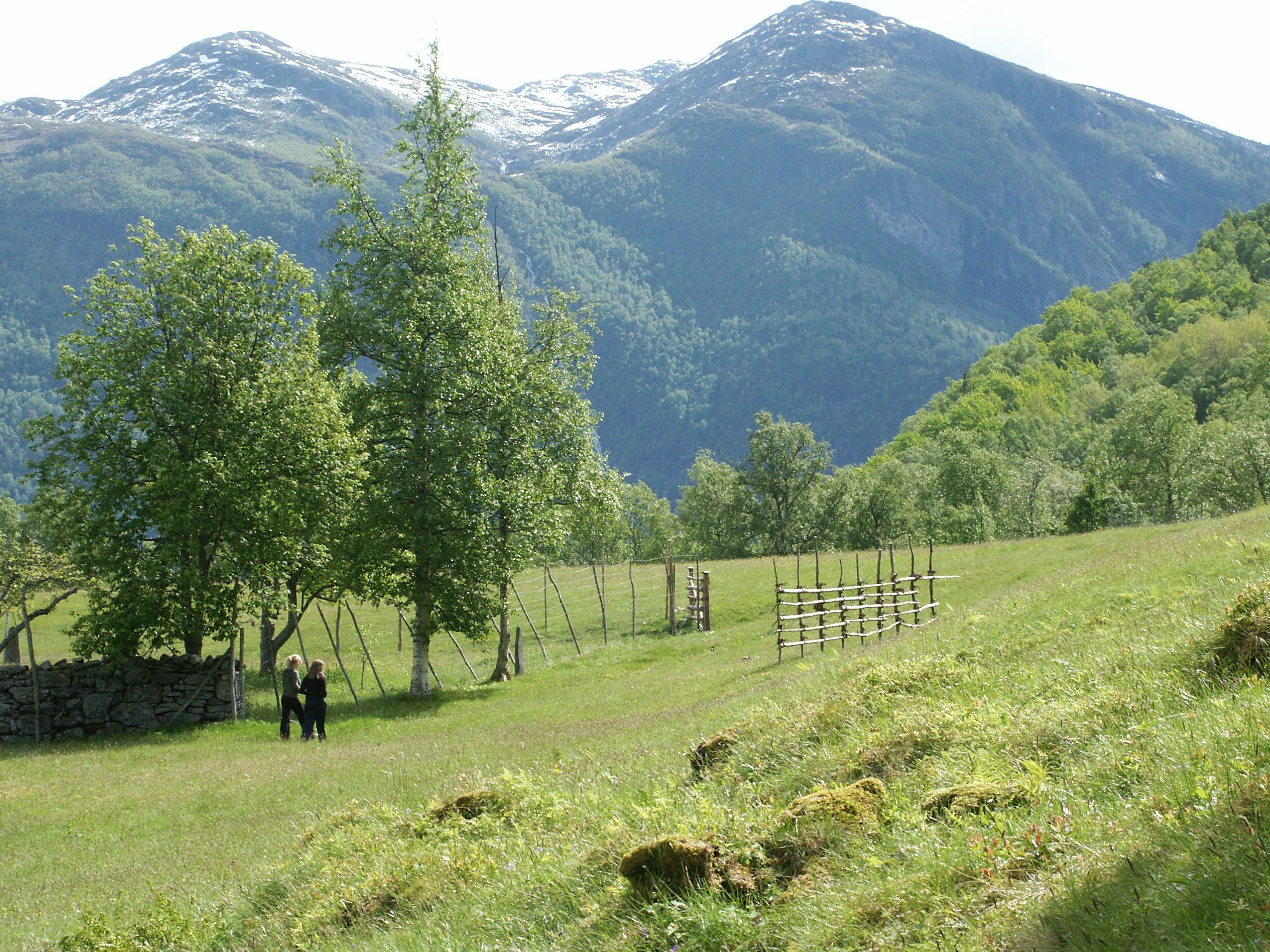
Wide and open meadows at Ytste Skotet
