= Sjøholt =

Village in Ålesund Municipality, Norway

- Village
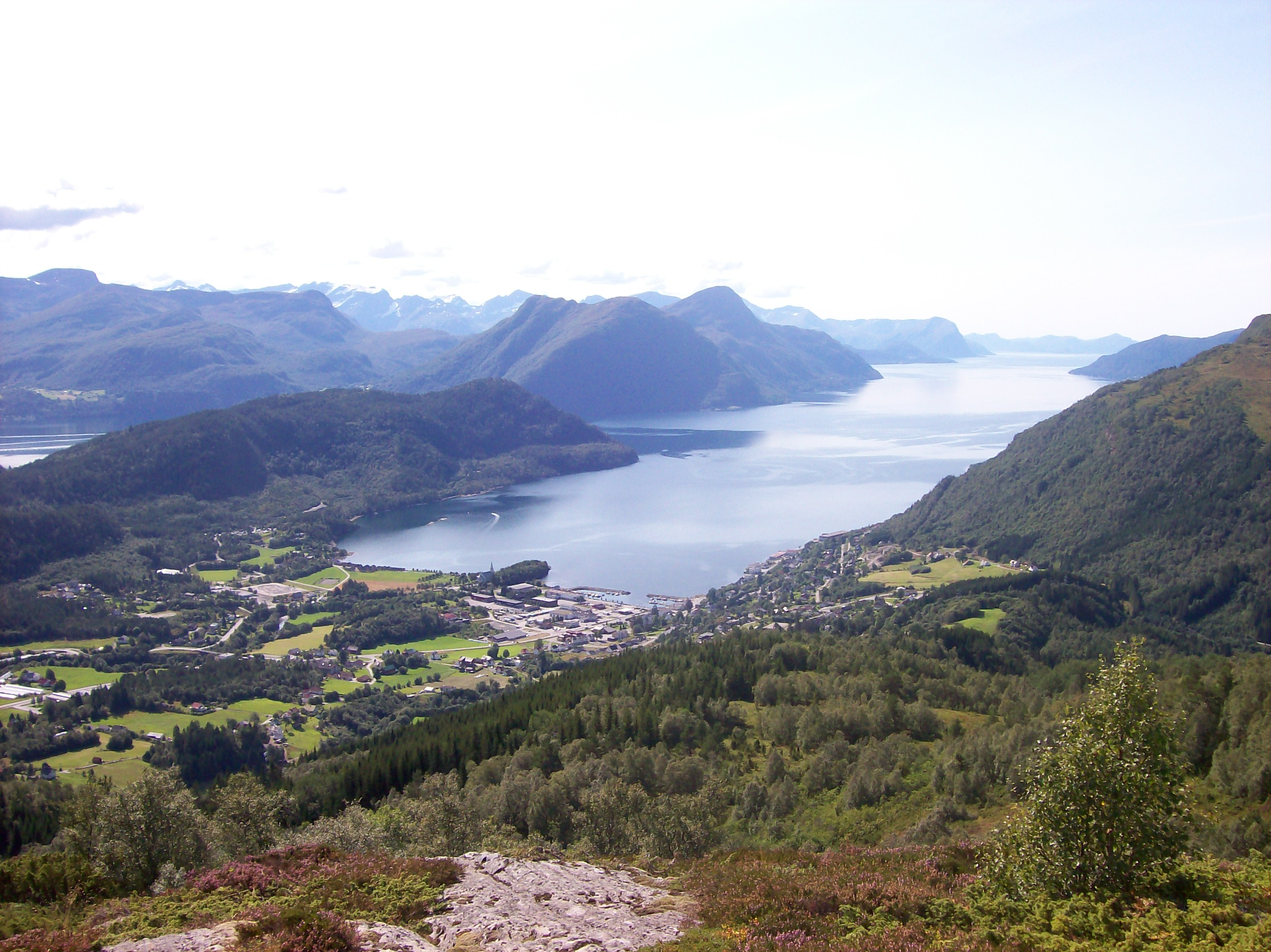
- View of Sjøholt, looking west
- Interactive map of Sjøholt
- Location within Møre og Romsdal Location within Norway
- Coordinates: 62.4826°N 6.8138°E
- Country: Norway
- Region: Western Norway
- County: Møre og Romsdal
- District: Sunnmøre
- Municipality: Ålesund

Area
  - Total: 1.61 km^{2} (0.62 sq mi)
- Elevation: 6 m (20 ft)

Population (2024)
  - Total: 1,586
  - Density: 985/km^{2} (2,550/sq mi)
- Time zone: UTC+01:00 (CET)
  - Summer (DST): UTC+02:00 (CEST)
- Post Code: 6240 Ørskog

Sjøholt is a village in Ålesund Municipality in Møre og Romsdal county, Norway. The village is located along the northern shore of the Storfjorden, about 10 kilometres (6.2 mi) east of the village of Skodje. The village of Stordal (in Fjord Municipality) is located about 18 kilometres (11 mi) to the south, through several tunnels. Sjøholt is located roughly halfway between the towns of Ålesund and Molde, along European route E39 and European route E136.

The 1.61-square-kilometre (400-acre) village has a population (2024) of 1,586 and a population density of 985 inhabitants per square kilometre (2,550/sq mi).

The village is home to furniture, wood, and plastics industries. The regional high school and Ørskog Church are also located here. The newspaper Bygdebladet is published in Sjøholt.

== History ==
The village was the administrative centre of the old Ørskog Municipality until 2020.
