= Seven Sisters Waterfall =

Waterfall in Møre og Romsdal, Norway

Seven Sisters (English) De syv søstrene (Norwegian) Dei sju systrene (Nynorsk)
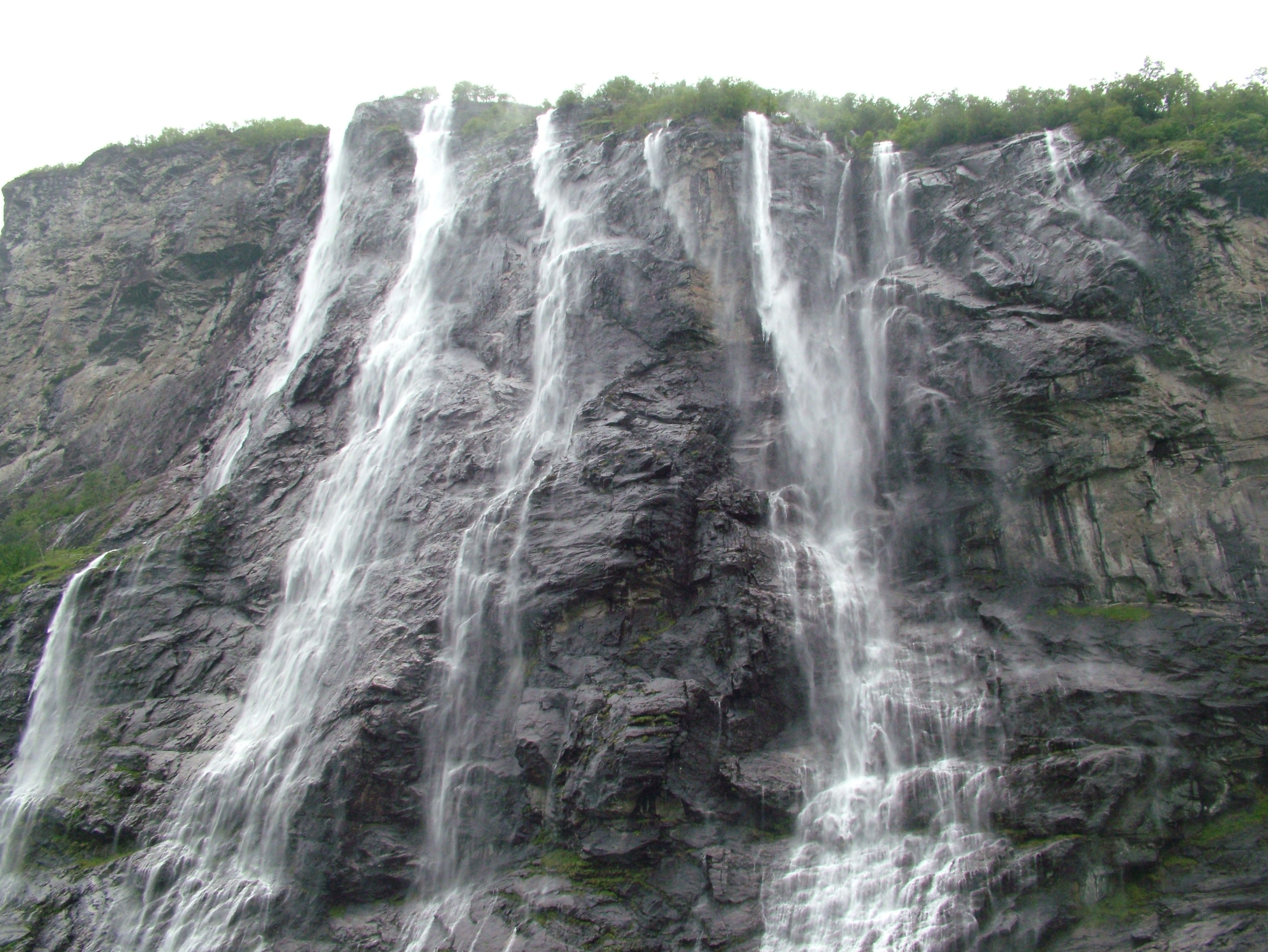
- View of the Seven Sisters Waterfall
- Interactive map of Seven Sisters (English); De syv søstrene (Norwegian); Dei sju systrene (Nynorsk)
- Location: Møre og Romsdal, Norway
- Coordinates: 62.1071°N 7.0942°E
- Type: Segmented plunges
- Elevation: 410 metres (1,350 ft)
- Total height: 410 metres (1,350 ft)
- Number of drops: 1
- Longest drop: 250 metres (820 ft)
- Total width: 229 metres (751 ft)
- Run: 213 metres (699 ft)
- Watercourse: Knivsflåelvane
- Average flow rate: 2 cubic metres per second (71 cu ft/s)

The Seven Sisters (Norwegian: De Syv Søstrene or Dei sju systrene, also known as Knivsflåfossen) is the 39th tallest waterfall in Norway. The 410-metre (1,350 ft) tall waterfall consists of seven separate streams, and the tallest of the seven has a free fall that measures 250 metres (820 ft).

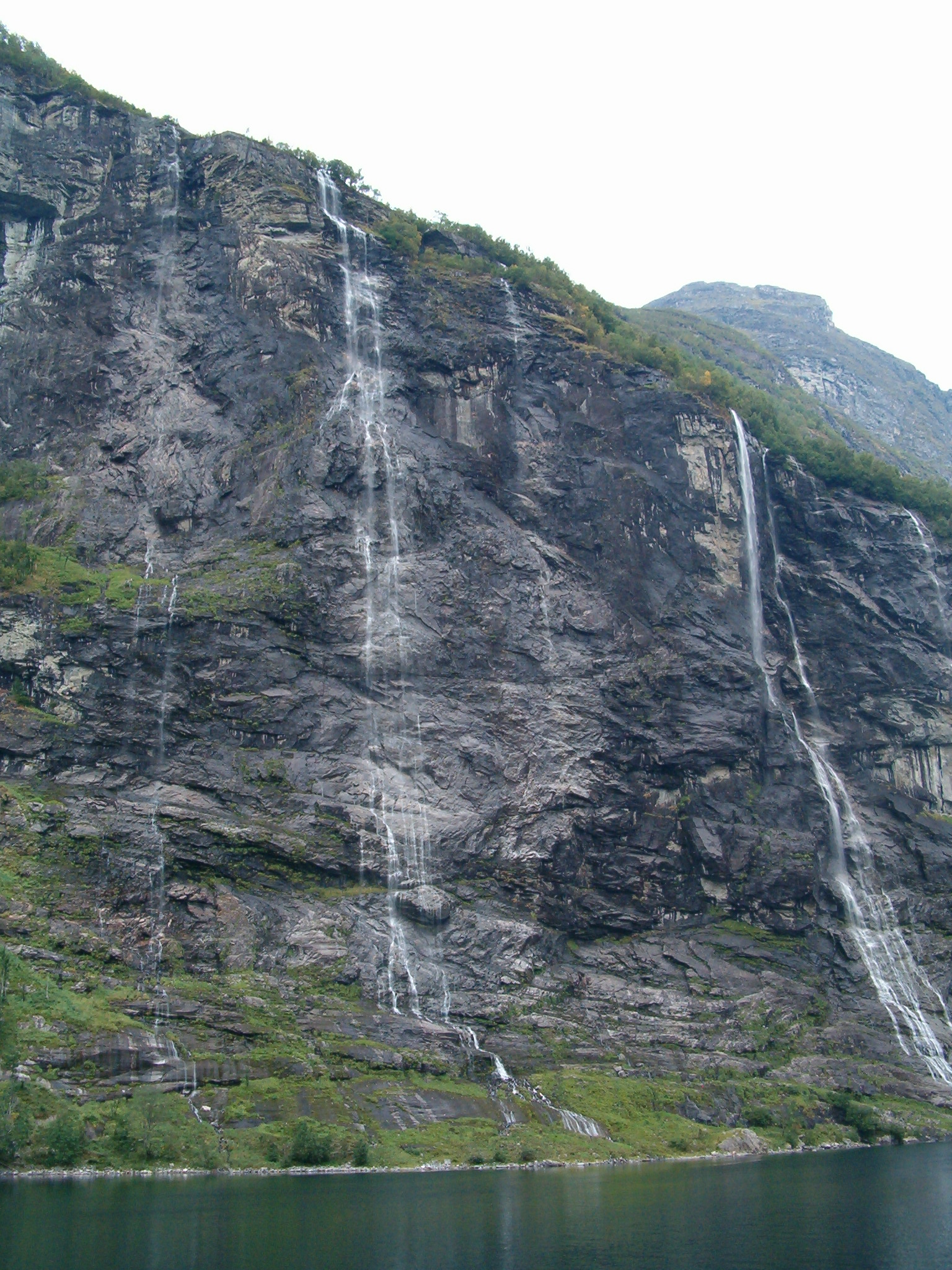
Diminished flow of the Seven Sisters Waterfall in September

The waterfall is located along the Geirangerfjorden in Stranda Municipality in Møre og Romsdal county, Norway. The waterfall is located just south of the historic Knivsflå farm, across the fjord from the old Skageflå farm. The falls are about 6.5 kilometres (4.0 mi) west of the village of Geiranger. It is part of the West Norwegian Fjords World Heritage Site.

== Name ==
"The Seven Sisters" (Norwegian: De Syv Søstrene or Nynorsk: Dei Sju Systrene) is located on the northern side of Geirangerfjorden, and directly across the fjord lies a single waterfall called "The Suitor" (Norwegian: Friaren). The legend of the seven sisters is that they dance playfully down the mountain. Meanwhile, across the fjord, the suitor (or courter) flirts playfully with them from afar.

== See also ==
- List of waterfalls
