= Geiranger Church =

Church in Møre og Romsdal, Norway

- Geiranger kyrkje
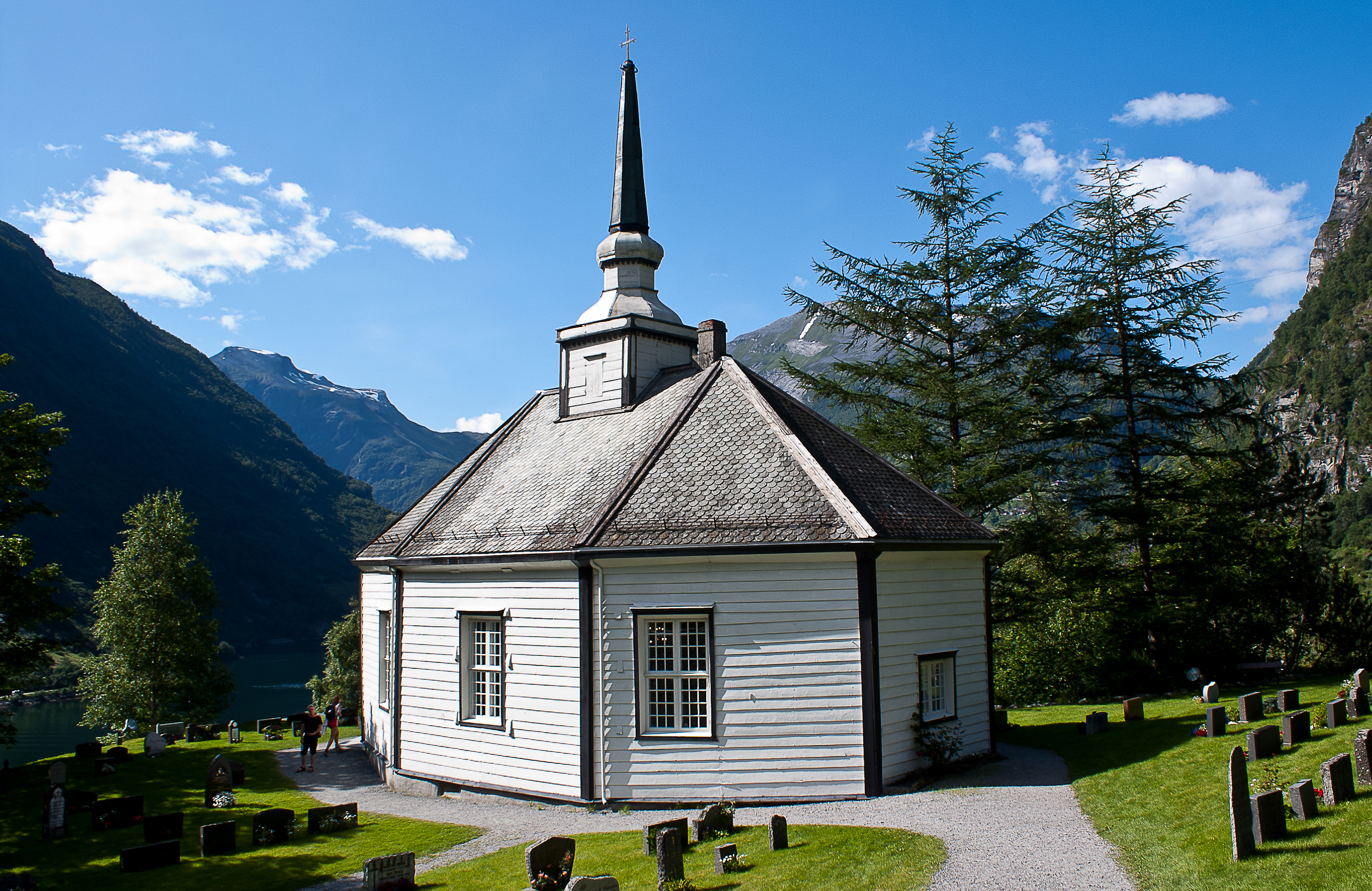
- View of the church
- Geiranger Church
- 62°05′56″N 7°12′26″E
- Location: Stranda Municipality, Møre og Romsdal
- Country: Norway
- Denomination: Church of Norway
- Churchmanship: Evangelical Lutheran

History
- Status: Parish church
- Founded: 15th century
- Consecrated: 28 August 1842

Architecture
- Functional status: Active
- Architect: Hans Klipe
- Architectural type: Octagonal
- Completed: 1842 (184 years ago)

Specifications
- Capacity: 124
- Materials: Wood

Administration
- Diocese: Møre bispedømme
- Deanery: Nordre Sunnmøre prosti
- Parish: Geiranger
- Norwegian Cultural Heritage Site
- Type: Church
- Status: Automatically protected
- ID: 84237

Geiranger Church (Norwegian: Geiranger kyrkje) is a parish church of the Church of Norway in Stranda Municipality in Møre og Romsdal county, Norway. It is located in the village of Geiranger, and the end of the famous Geirangerfjorden. It is the church for the Geiranger parish which is part of the Nordre Sunnmøre prosti (deanery) in the Diocese of Møre. The white, wooden church was built in an octagonal design in 1842 using plans drawn up by the architect Hans Klipe. The church seats about 124 people.

== History ==
The earliest existing historical records of the church date back to 1589, but it was not new at that time. The first church in Geiranger was a wooden stave church that was possibly constructed in the 15th century as a chapel. The first building measured about 6 metres (20 ft) wide and about 17 metres (56 ft) long. At some point, a timber-framed chancel and church porch were added to the building. In 1742, the old chapel was torn down. Two years later, in 1744, a new wooden cruciform church was completed on the same site. On 2 July 1841 the church burned down after a deaf-mute person who was a part of the parish set the building on fire in a case of arson. Church records say the man was 52 years old and was always known for being a "proper and Godly man." The following year in 1843, a new octagonal building was constructed on the same site. The new building has a tower on the roof over the centre of the church. The new church was completed on 16 July 1842 and it was consecrated on 28 August 1842.

The church was decorated by woodcarver Einar Flydahl on the occasion of the church's centenary. The altarpiece was carved by Flydal and painted by Harald Brun in 1902, and depicts Christ as comforter. The church bell is from 1899 and the organ from 1964.

== Media gallery ==
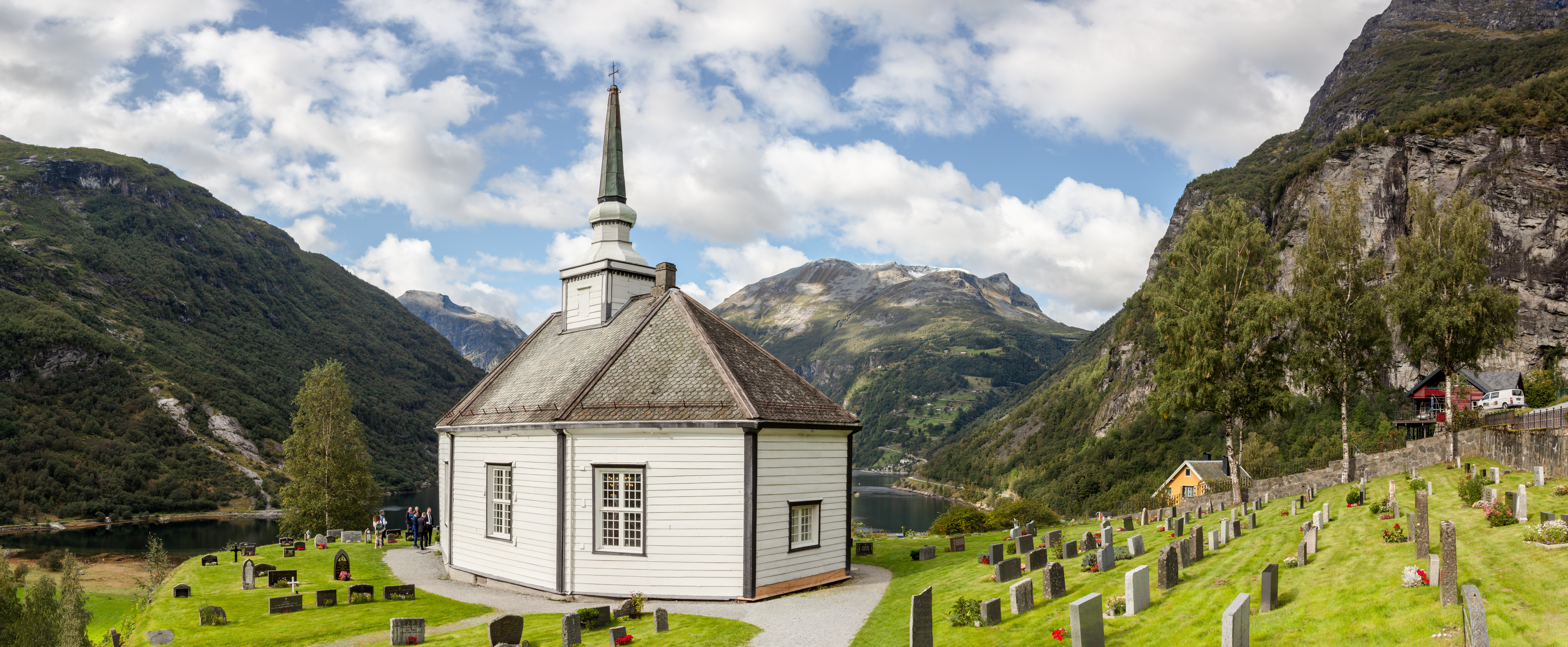

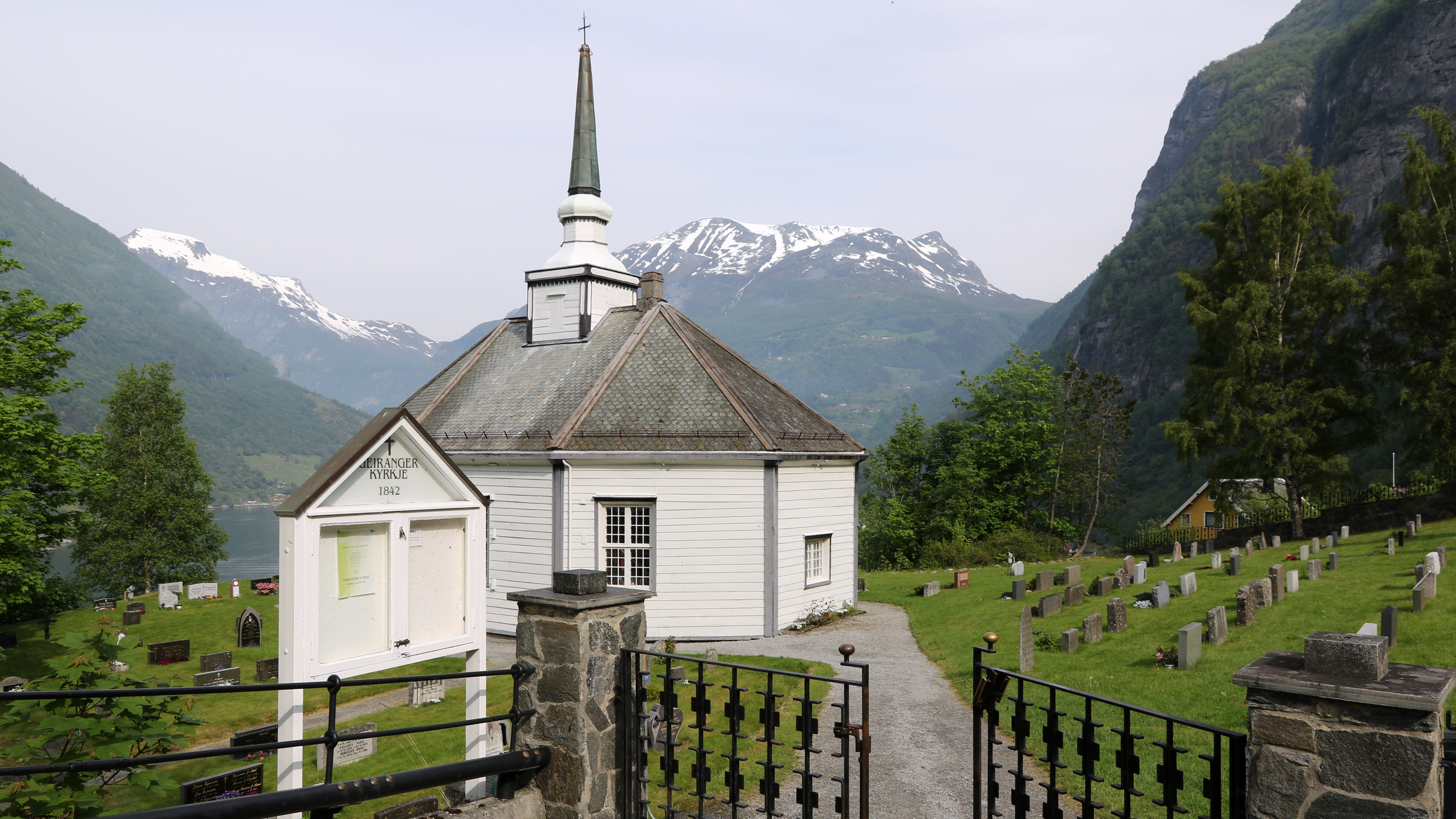

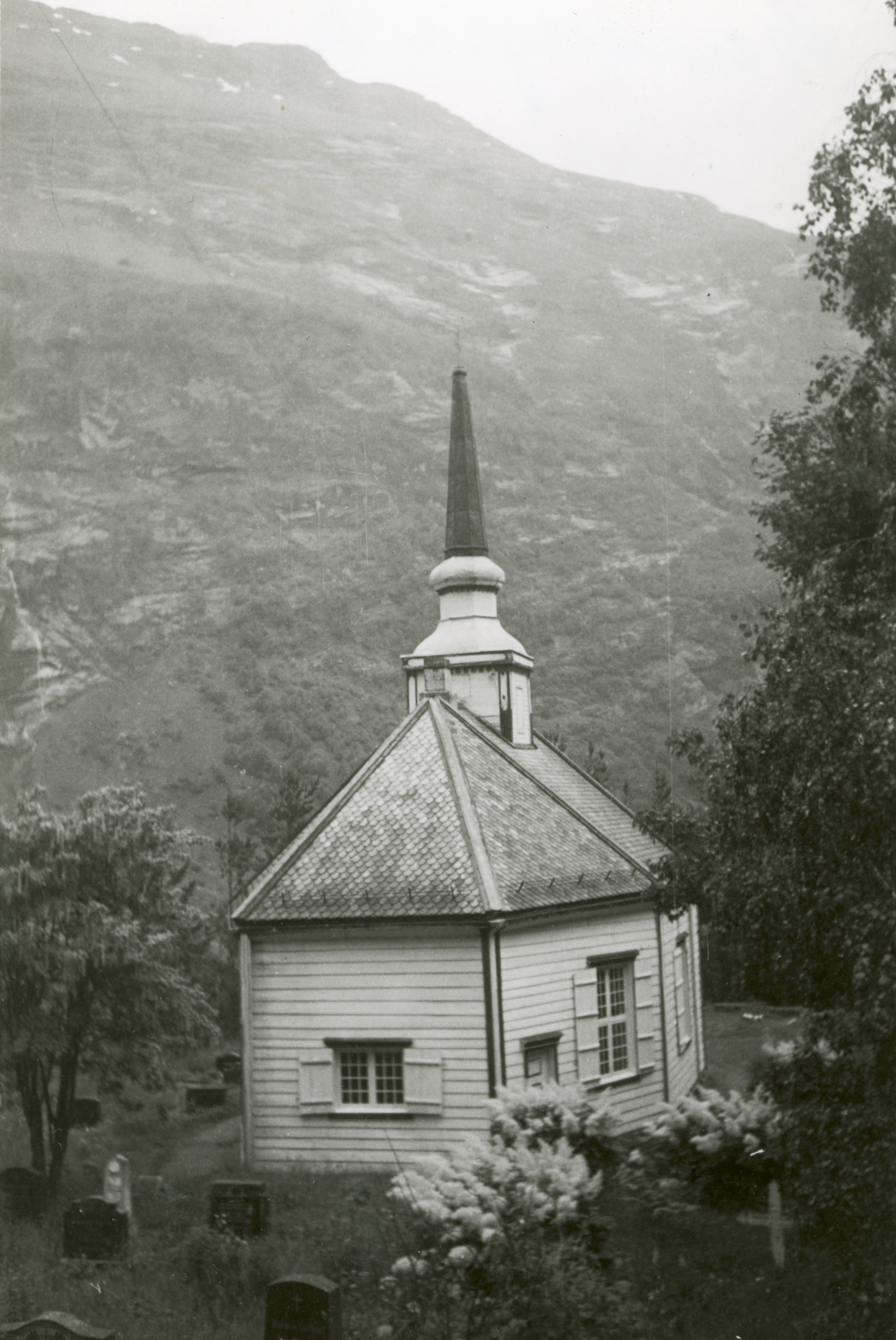

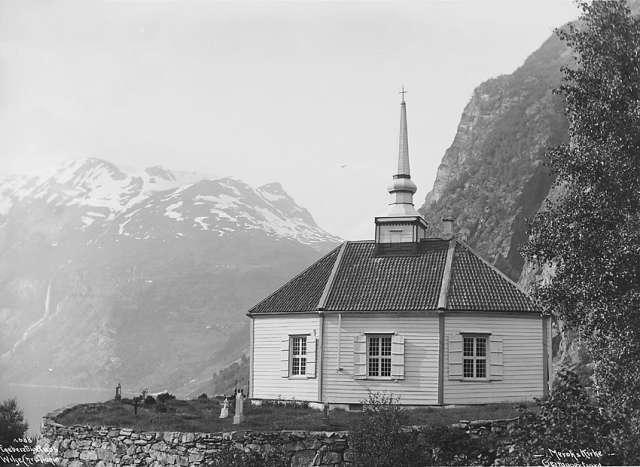

== See also ==
- List of churches in Møre
