= Geiranger – From Fjord to Summit =

Sporting event in Stranda, Norway

Geiranger and the track to Mount Dalsnibba

Geiranger – From Fjord to Summit (Norwegian: Geiranger - Frå fjord til fjell) is a sporting event in the village of Geiranger in Stranda Municipality in Møre og Romsdal county, Norway. The event was started in 1994 and consists of the Geiranger Half Marathon, the Dalsnibba Cycle Race, the Geiranger March, and the Dalsnibba Minithon. All of the competitions begin at sea level at the Geirangerfjord, and all (except for the Minithon) end on top of the mountain Dalsnibba, at 1,500 metres (4,900 ft) above sea level. The annual event draws about 400-500 participants.

== History ==
Of a total of 21 kilometres (13 mi), the first 16 kilometres (9.9 mi) is a part of the Norwegian national road 63, which was built in 1889 and received a gold medal for excellent road engineering at the World's fair in Paris in 1900.

The best time for Geiranger Half Marathon is 1:26:42, which was set by Kílian Jornet Burgada in 2019. For women, Anita Håkenstad has the record with 1:46:19 set in 2006. For the Dalsnibba Cycle Race, Alf-Roger Holme has the record with 1:07:01 for men and Frid Harstad got 1:29:02 when she was the fastest woman ever. For racing bicycle, Lars Kristian Johnsen has the time 1:06:43 and for women, Hanne Trønnes finished with 1:34:34. All four bicycle records were achieved in 2006.

The Geiranger Half Marathon was one of the first Fell running event in Norway when it started in 1994. In 2003, the Skåla Opp was started and is today the biggest in Norway.
