= Dalsnibba =

Mountain in Møre og Romsdal, Norway

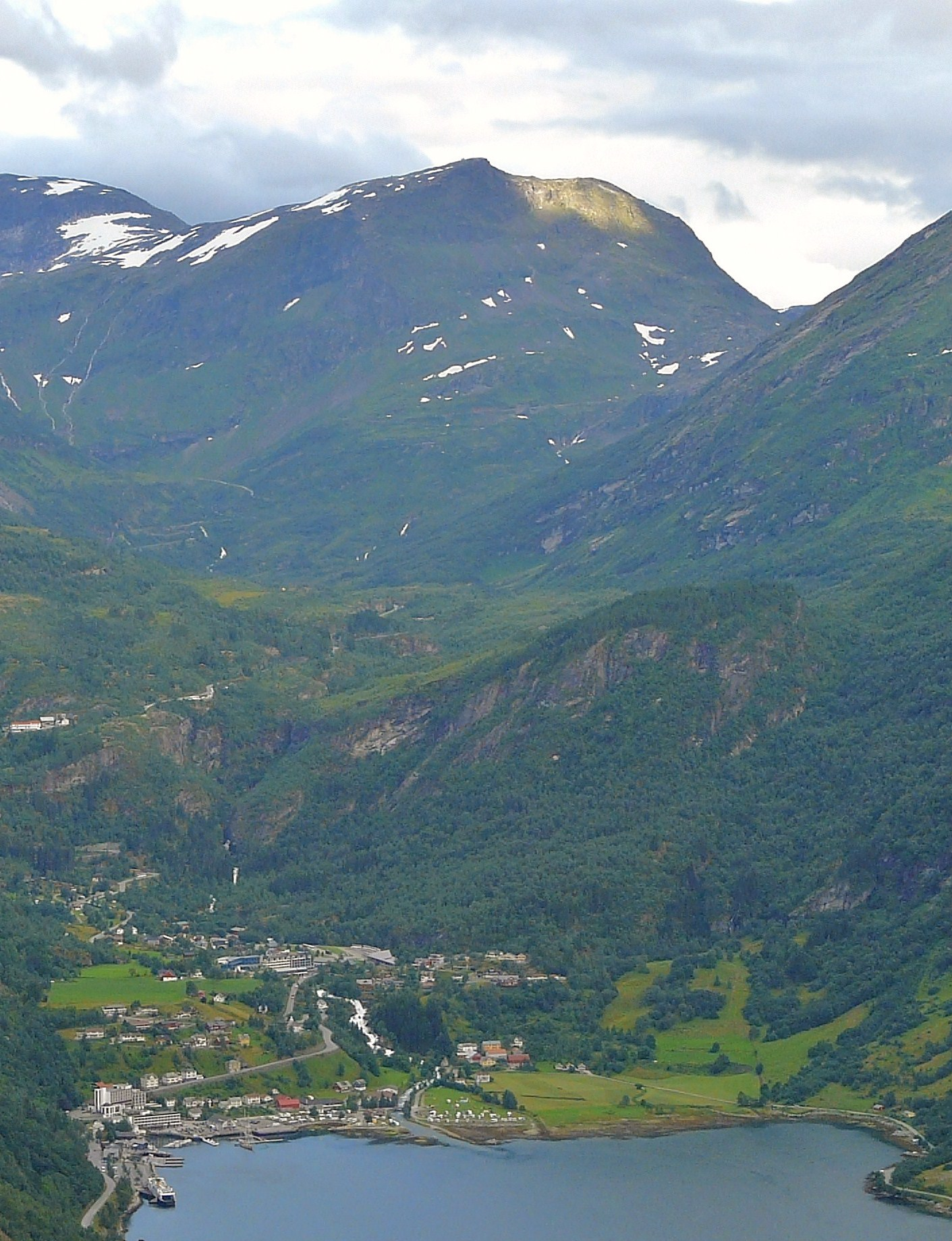

Highest point
- Elevation: 1,476 m (4,843 ft)
- Prominence: 166 m (545 ft)
- Parent peak: Storbaren
- Isolation: 2.2 km (1.4 mi)
- Coordinates: 62°02′56″N 7°16′10″E

Geography
- Interactive map of the mountain
- Location: Møre og Romsdal, Norway
- Parent range: Sunnmørsalpene
- Topo map(s): 1219 II Geiranger and 1418 IV Lodalskåpa

Dalsnibba is a mountain in Stranda Municipality in Møre og Romsdal county, Norway. It is located at the end of the Geiranger valley, about 7 km (4 mi) south of the village of Geiranger and the Geirangerfjorden. The 2-square-kilometre (0.8 sq mi) lake Djupvatnet lies directly to the southeast of the mountain. The mountain is located very near the county border with both Innlandet and Vestland counties, in the southeastern part of Møre og Romsdal county.

Dalsnibba offers a good view and is therefore a popular tourist destination. Dalsnibba is often covered by snow even in the summer. The Norwegian County Road 63 passes along the south side of the mountain, and from that road, there is a private toll road called Nibbevegen, owned and operated by Geiranger Skysslag, that goes up to the summit of Dalsnibba, a drive of about 21 km (13 mi) from Geiranger. It was completed in 1939 but due to the Second World War its official opening was delayed until 19 July 1948. The road was tarmacked in 2013.

The Geiranger – From Fjord to Summit running and cycling race begins in the village of Geiranger and ends on top of Dalsnibba.

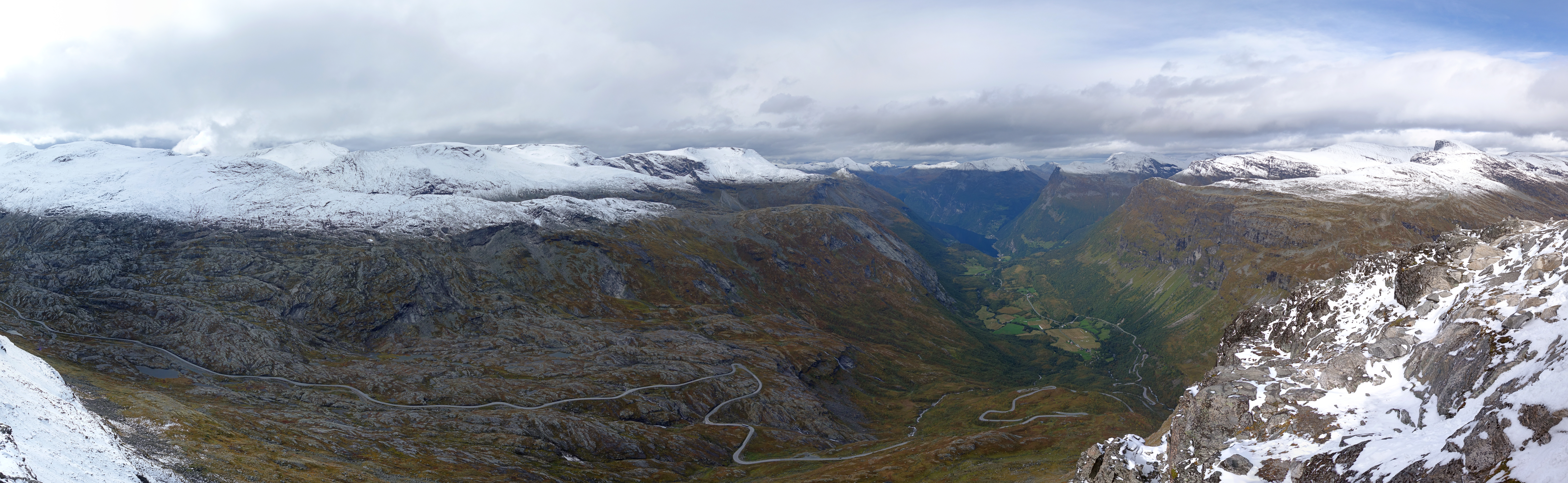
View of Geirangerfjord and Geirangervegen from Dalsnibba

== See also ==
- List of mountains of Norway
