= Nærøyfjord =

UNESCO World Heritage Site in Norway

UNESCO World Heritage Site
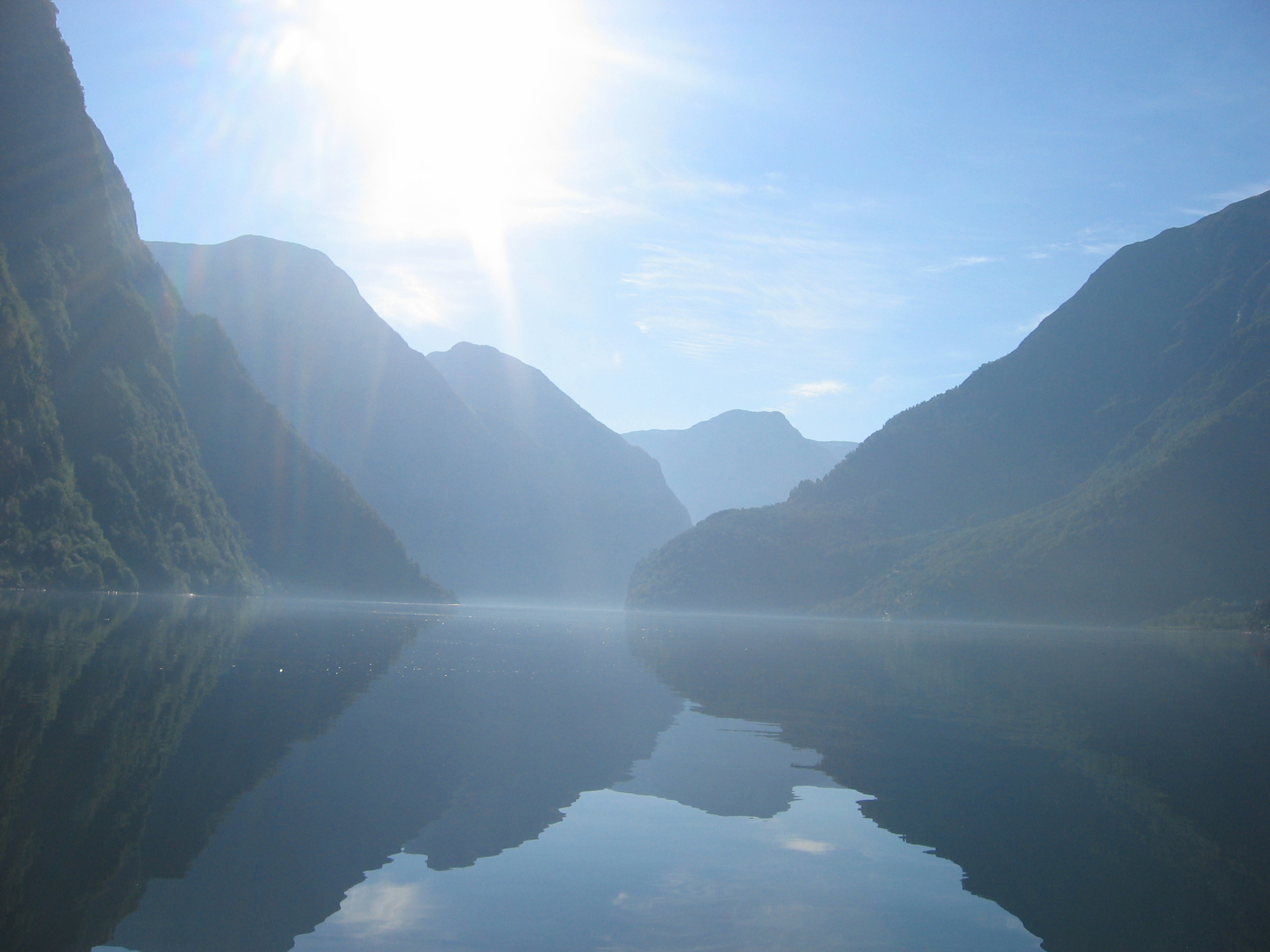
- Nærøyfjord

- Location within Norway Location within Vestland
- Official name: Nærøyfjord Area
- Location: Aurland, Norway
- Part of: West Norwegian Fjords – Geirangerfjord and Nærøyfjord
- Criteria: Natural: (vii)(viii)
- Reference: 1195-002
- Inscription: 2005 (29th Session)
- Area: 51,802 ha (128,010 acres)
- Coordinates: 60°56′37″N 6°55′53″E

The Nærøyfjord (or Nærøyfjorden, Urban East Norwegian: [ˈnæ̂ːrœʏˌfjuːɳ]) is a fjord in Aurland Municipality in Vestland county, Norway. The narrow fjord is a branch of the large Sognefjord. The 18-kilometre (11 mi) long fjord is only 500 metres (1,600 ft) wide in some parts.

The river Nærøydalselvi flows down the valley Nærøydalen into the fjord at the village of Gudvangen, near the European route E16 highway. The village of Bakka and the Bakka Church are both located on the west shore of the fjord.

Since 2005, the Nærøyfjord has been listed as a UNESCO World Heritage Site. It has also been rated by the National Geographic Society as the world's number one natural heritage site along with the Geirangerfjord.

The West Norwegian Fjords, including Nærøyfjord, are primarily presented and recognized internationally as a 'nature/landscape heritage' site rather than as cultural heritage.

The fjord is a popular tourist destination, with significant international recognition. Research from 2020 indicated that the official social media accounts for the West Norwegian Fjords (including Nærøyfjord) had attracted over 68,000 followers and more than 860,000 likes on Instagram, demonstrating its global appeal and significance.

Unlike some transboundary UNESCO Marine World Heritage sites, the West Norwegian Fjords are managed by Norway as a single-country property, which facilitates coordinated conservation and management approaches.

== In popular culture ==
Nærøyfjord was also used as an inspiration for Arendelle in Frozen.

== Media gallery ==
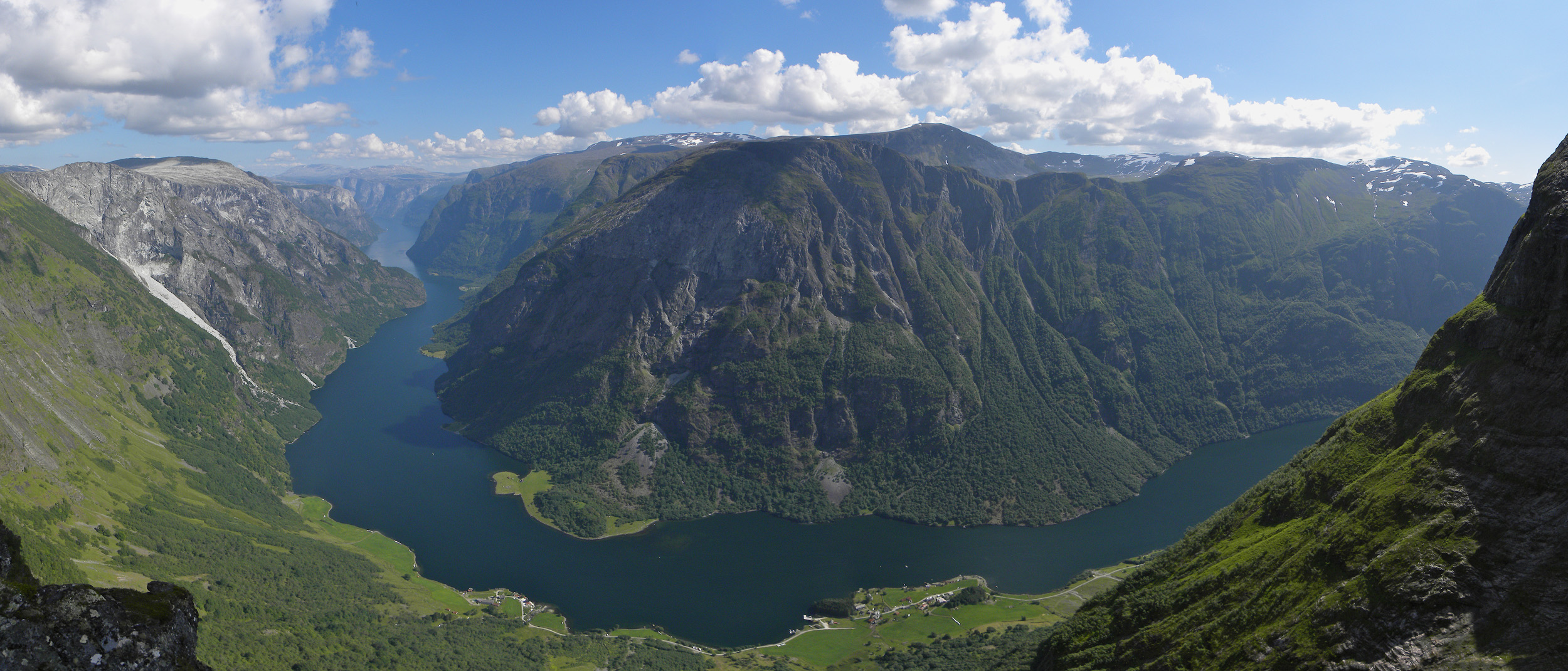
Nærøyfjorden from Bakkanosi

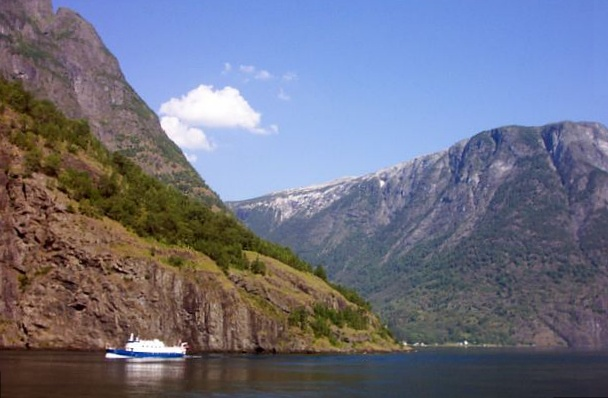
Nærøyfjord with sightseeing boat

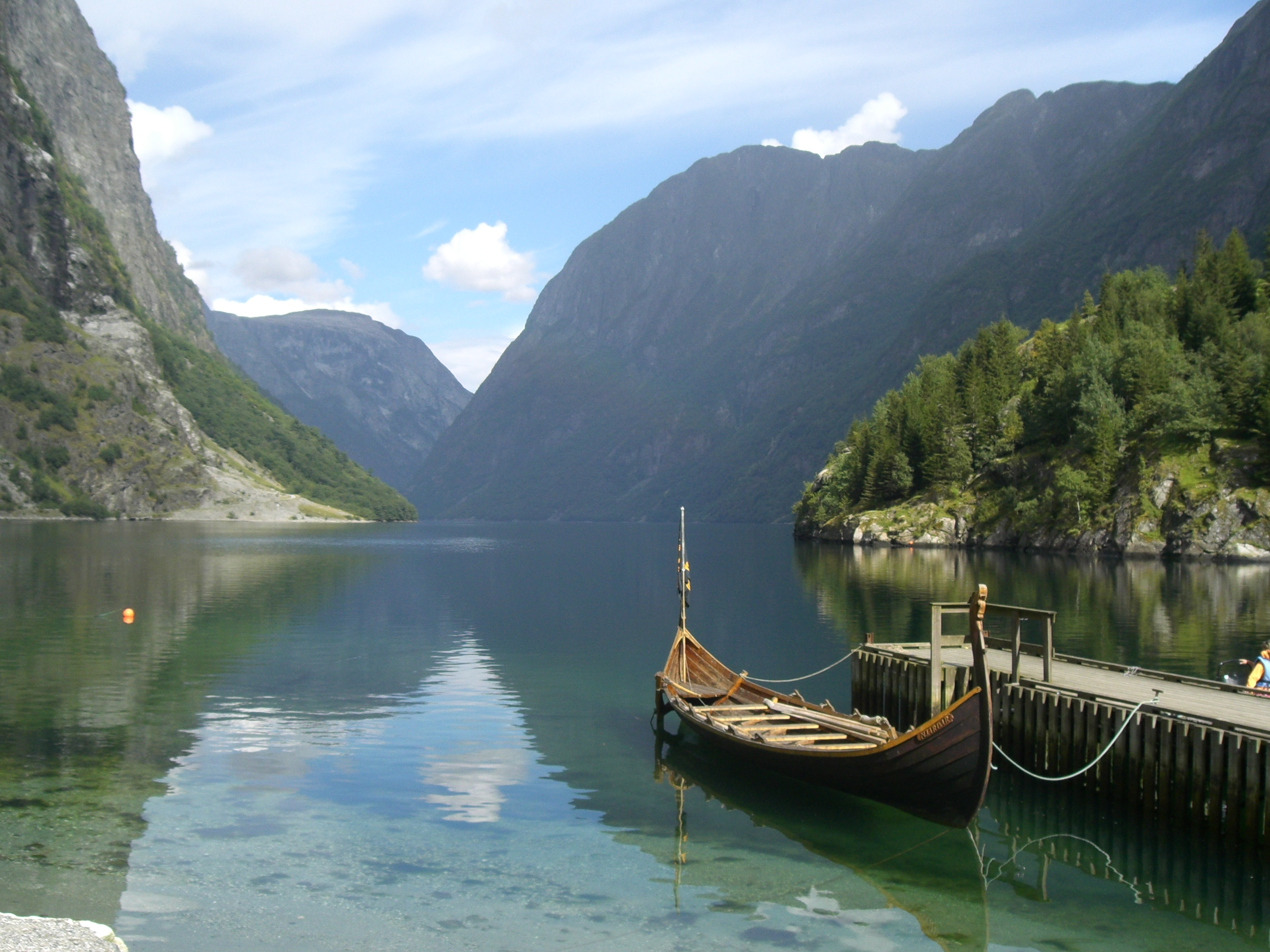
View from Gudvangen

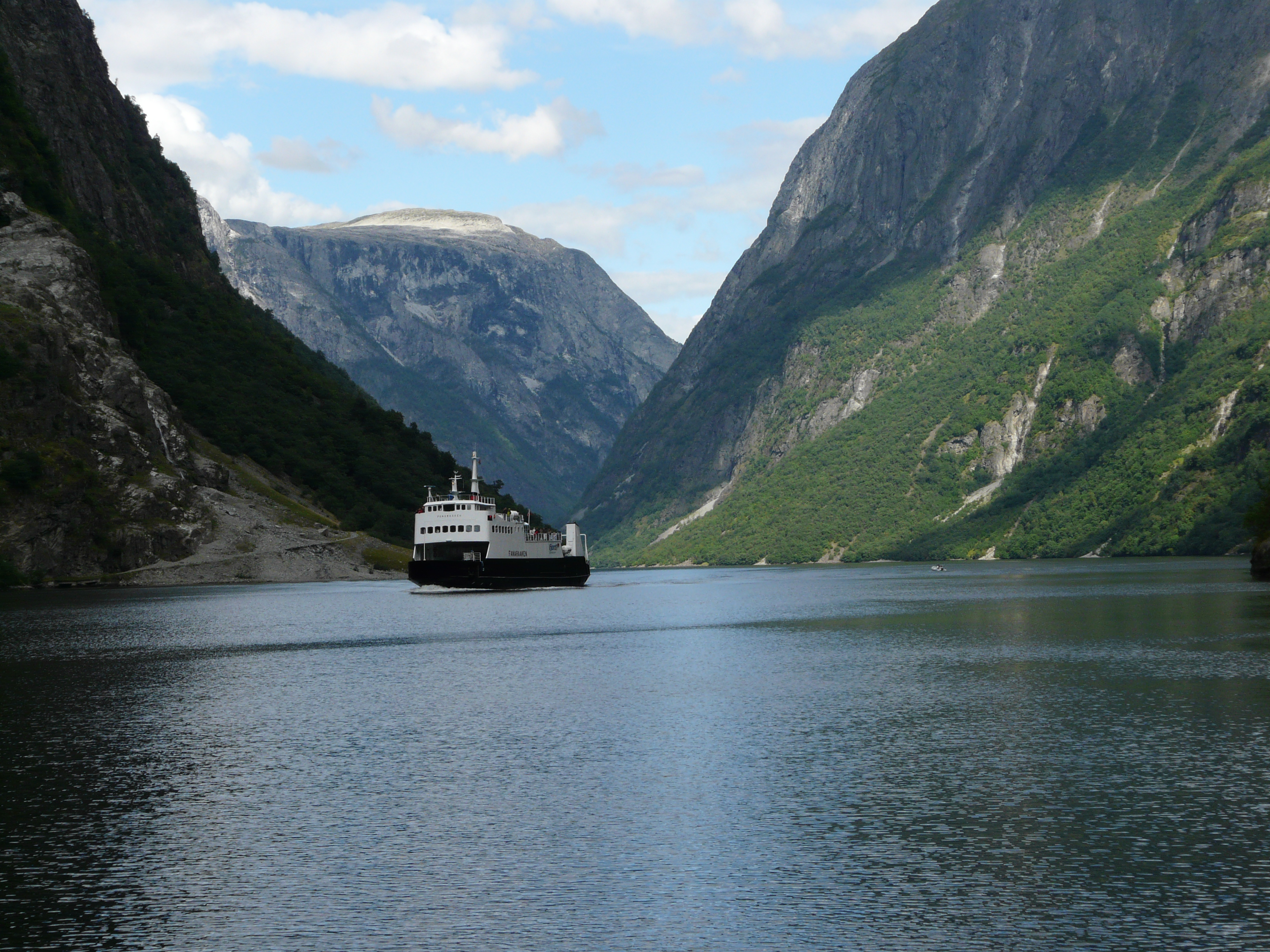
Gudvangen ferry

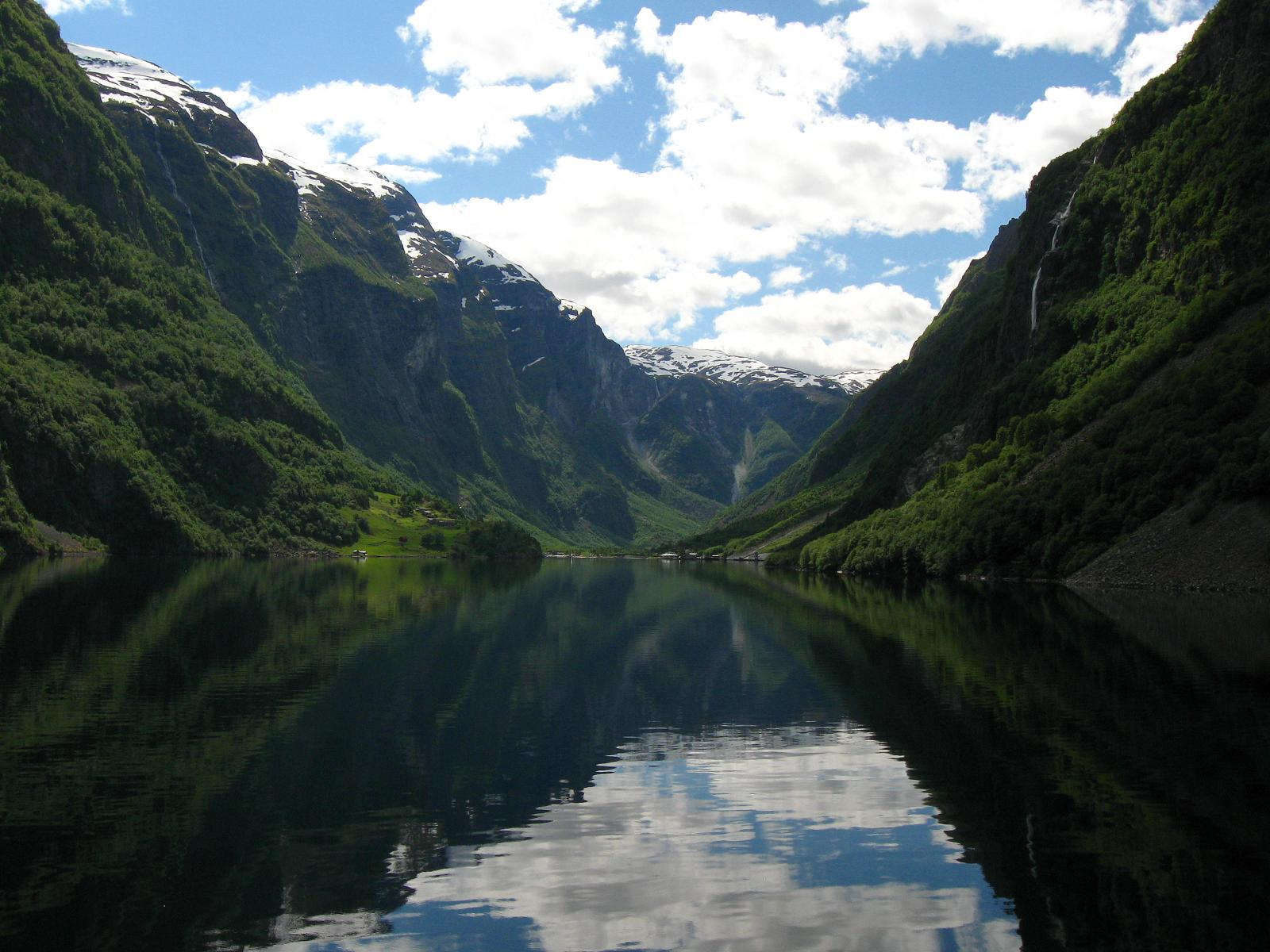
Nærøyfjord

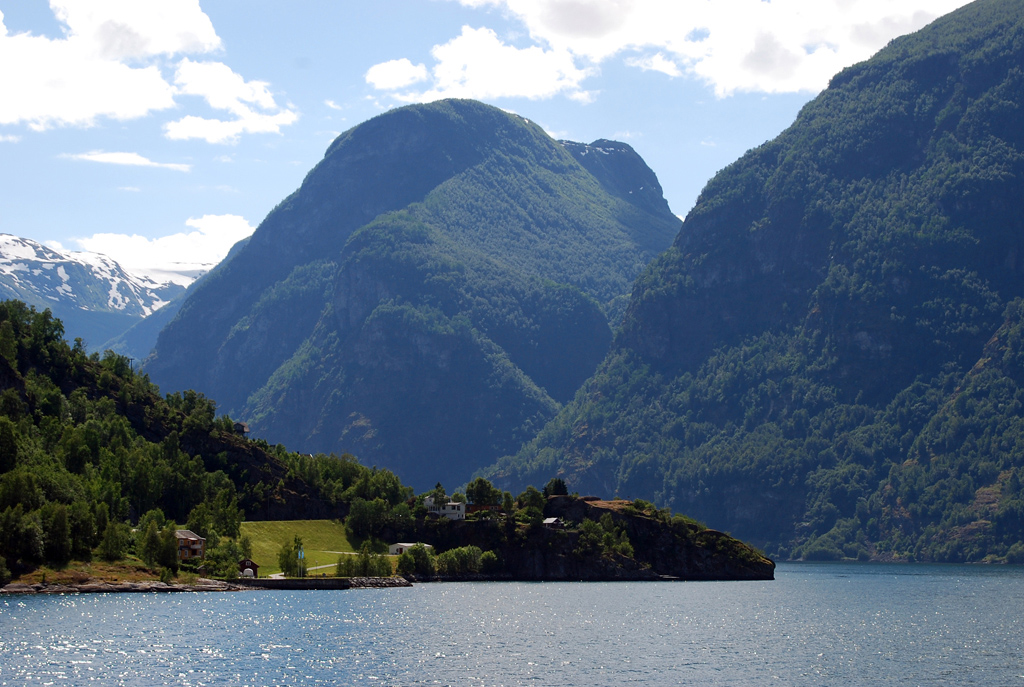
Nærøyfjord

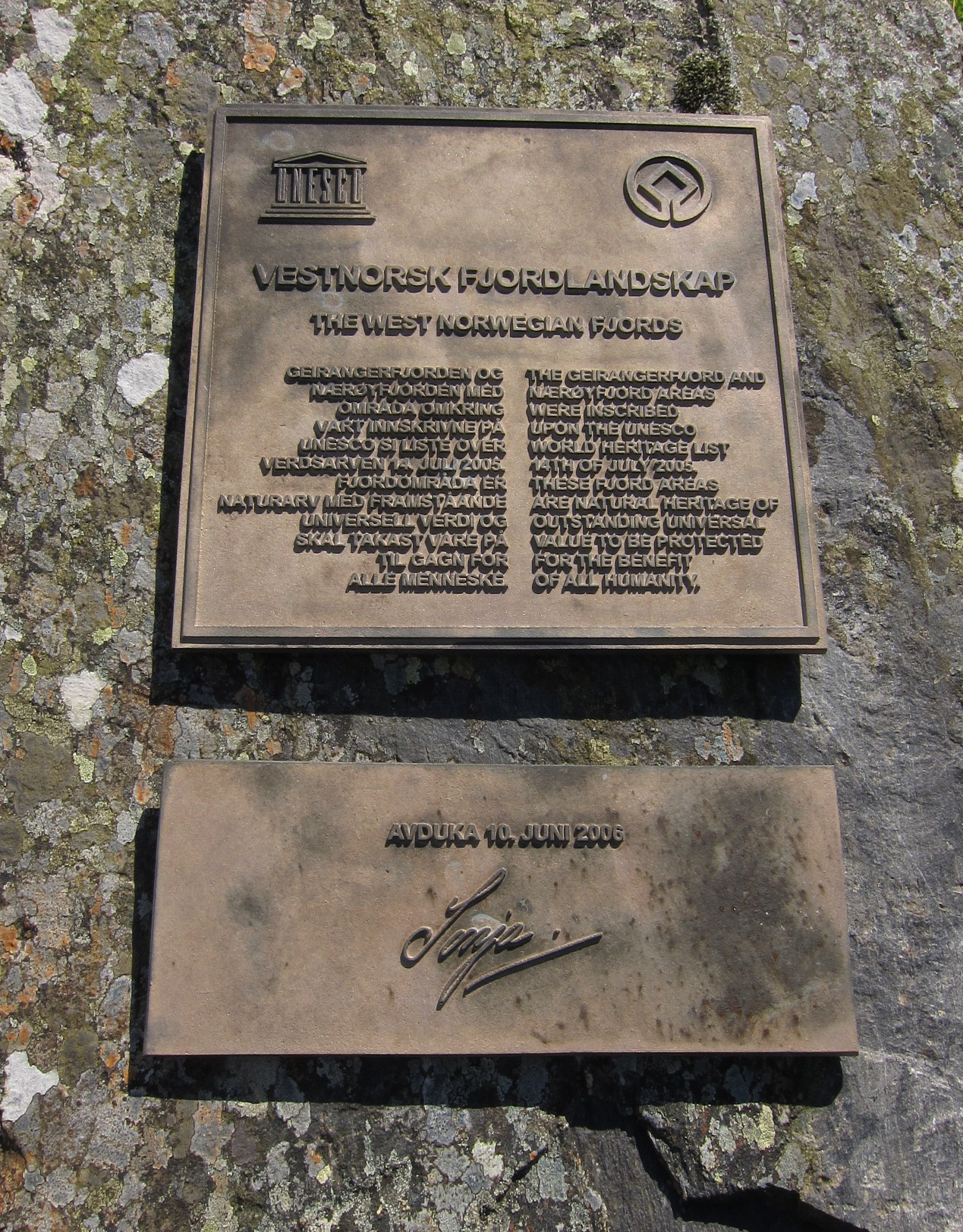
Plaquette at Bakka, signed by Queen Sonja of Norway June 10, 2006.
