= Skageflå =

Historic mountain farm in Stranda Municipality, Norway

- Historic farm
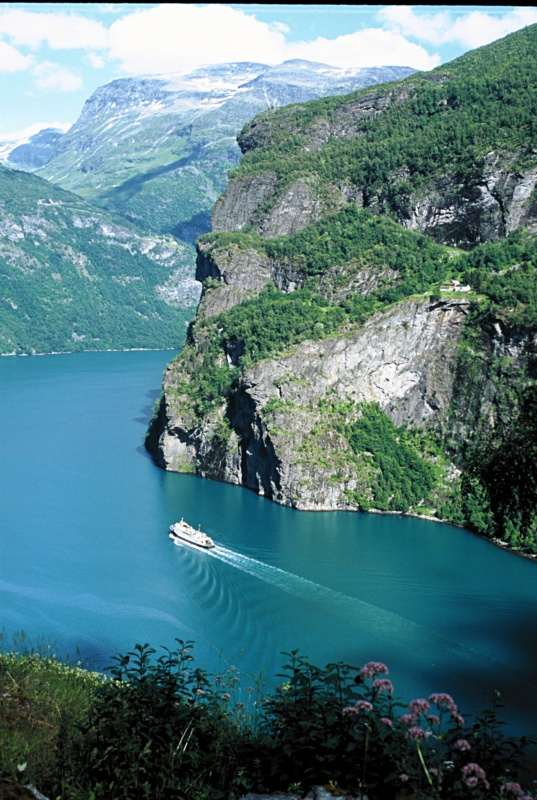
- View of the Geirangerfjord; Skageflå is on the side of the mountain, halfway up. Credit: Konrad Baginski
- Interactive map of Skageflå
- Location within Møre og Romsdal Location within Norway
- Coordinates: 62.11009°N 7.12121°E
- Country: Norway
- Region: Western Norway
- County: Møre og Romsdal
- District: Sunnmøre
- Municipality: Stranda Municipality
- Elevation: 247 m (810 ft)
- Time zone: UTC+01:00 (CET)
  - Summer (DST): UTC+02:00 (CEST)
- Post Code: 6216 Geiranger

Skageflå is one of a handful of historic mountain farms on the steep mountainsides along the Geirangerfjorden. It is located in Stranda Municipality in Møre og Romsdal county, Norway. Skageflå lies approximately 250 metres (820 ft) above the fjord. The farm is a 2 to 4 hour walk from the nearby village of Geiranger, and can also be reached with help of a local sightseeing boat (M/S Geirangerfjord). The boat takes passengers to a spot on the fjord just below the farm, from where they face a very steep half-hour climb. Coastal Odyssey, a sea kayaking company, runs guided kayaking tours with interpretation to the farm. Active Geiranger also does guided kayak trips to the farm as well as water taxi trips to the trail. Directly across the fjord is the old Knivsflå farm and the Seven Sisters waterfall.

Although it was abandoned in 1916, Skageflå was once one of the richer goat farms in the Geiranger area, and had two or three mountain pastures for its animals. The farm was inhabited from the Middle Ages until 1916; it is now a tourist attraction. A rock slide in 1873 destroyed much of the cultivated land. From the fjord, the farm has a difficult uphill hike to get to the farm.

Magdalene Thoresen, Henrik Ibsen's mother-in-law, said of the area:

This fjord is surrounded by the steepest and, one is almost tempted to say, the most preposterous mountains on the entire west coast. It is very narrow and has no habitable shore area, for the precipitous heights rise in sheer and rugged strata almost straight out of the water. Foaming waterfalls plunge into the fjord from jagged peaks. There are, however, a few mountain farms here, and of these one or two have such hazardous access, by paths that wind around steep precipices, and by bridges that are fixed to the mountain with iron bolts and rings, that they bear witness in a most striking way to the remarkable powers of invention which the challenges of nature have developed in man.

== Name ==
The first element is the genitive case of the word skagi which means headland or cape (related to the famous Danish place Skagen). The last element is the word flå which means "field on a mountainside".
