= Knivsflå =

Historic mountain farm in Stranda Municipality, Norway

- Historic farm
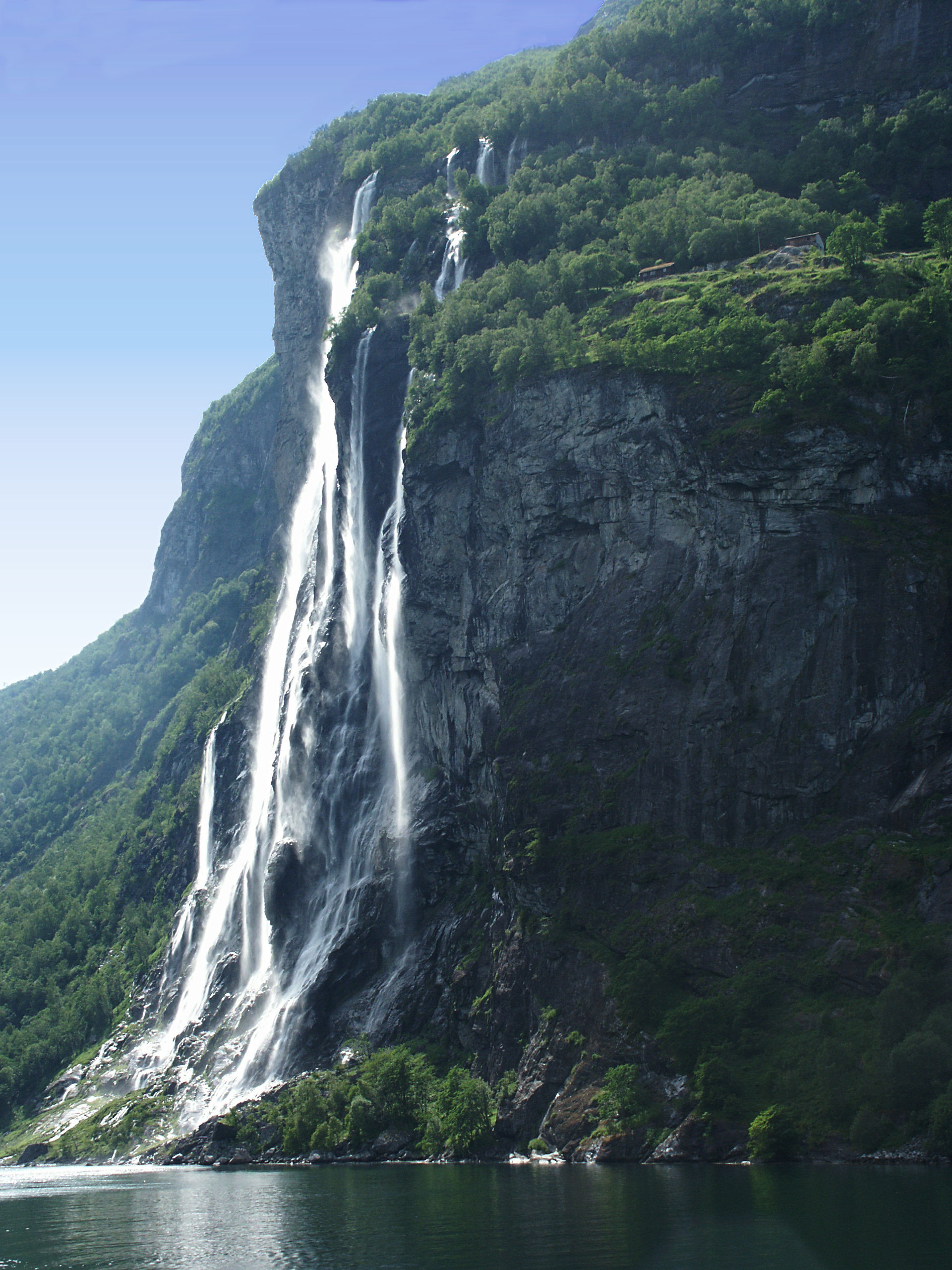
- View of Knivsflå by the Seven Sisters waterfall, 240 m (790 ft) above the Geirangerfjord. Credit: Frode Inge Helland
- Interactive map of Knivsflå
- Location within Møre og Romsdal Location within Norway
- Coordinates: 62.10956°N 7.09661°E
- Country: Norway
- Region: Western Norway
- County: Møre og Romsdal
- District: Sunnmøre
- Municipality: Stranda Municipality
- Elevation: 239 m (784 ft)
- Time zone: UTC+01:00 (CET)
  - Summer (DST): UTC+02:00 (CEST)
- Post Code: 6216 Geiranger

Knivsflå is one of a handful of historic mountain farms on the steep mountainsides along the Geirangerfjorden. It is located in Stranda Municipality in Møre og Romsdal county, Norway. Actually it was two farms sharing the location, and they have been inhabited since at least the 1600s. There is also a mountain pasture situated some 500 metres (1,600 ft) above the fjord. It is reachable by a hardly visible footpath, starting from Knivsflå. The Knivsflå farm was abandoned in 1898 due to the danger of falling rocks. The farm is located to the north of the Seven Sisters waterfall, and directly across the fjord from the old Skageflå farm.

Knivsflå lies approximately 240 metres (790 ft) above the fjord. One can reach Knivsflå from the nearby village of Geiranger with the help of the sight seeing boat (M/S Geirangerfjord) that will take one to a spot below the farm, the walk up then takes 30–60 minutes. Also, Coastal Odyssey, a sea kayaking company in Geiranger, runs guided kayaking trips to the farm with interpretation. Active Geiranger also does guided kayak trips to the farm as well as a water taxi that can take you to the trail.

== Name ==
The first element is the genitive of kniv which means "knife". The last element is flå which means "field on a mountain side". The farm is named after a sharp mountain ridge with the name Kniven (meaning "the knife").
