= West Norwegian Fjords =

UNESCO World Heritage Site
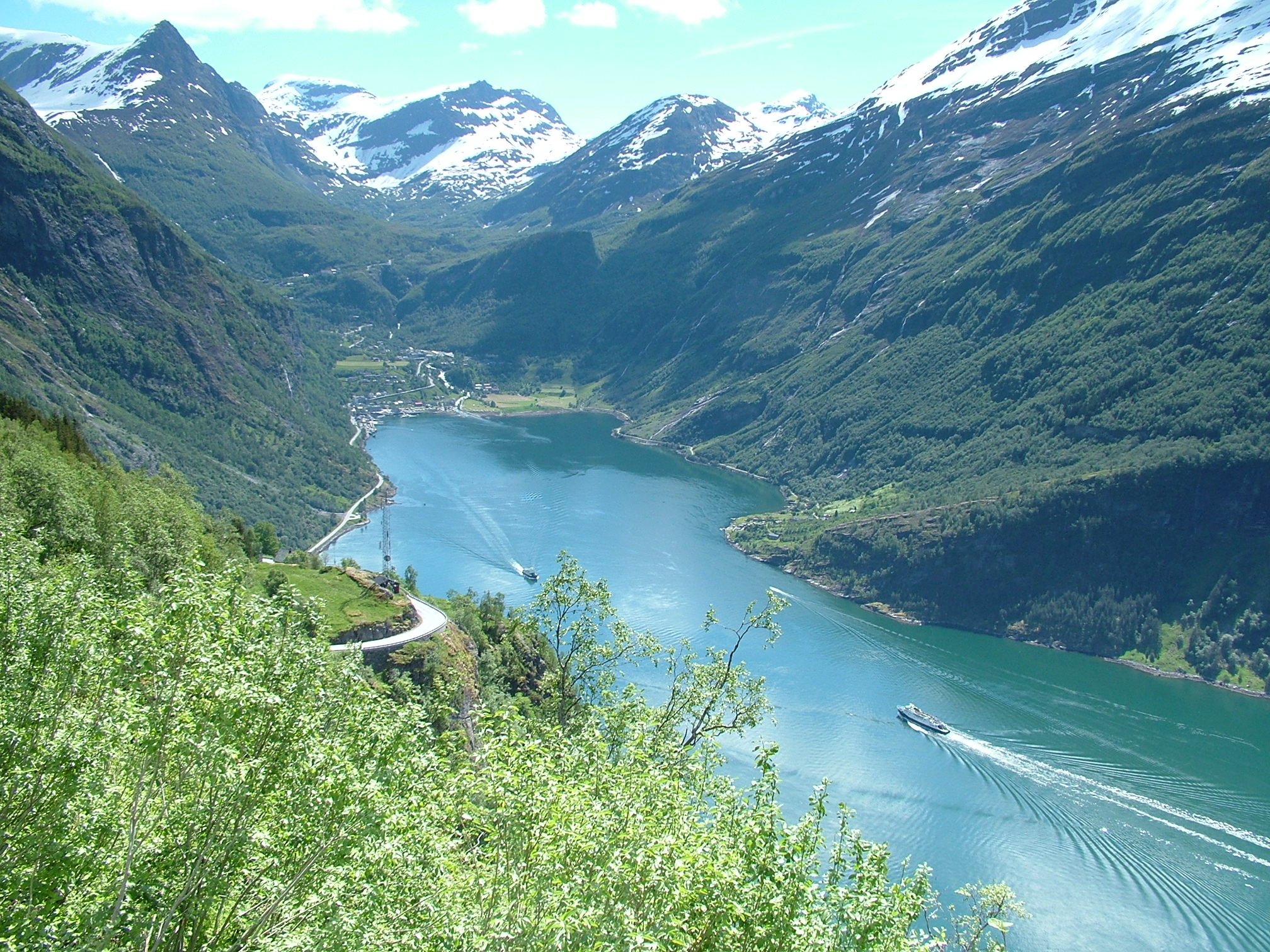
- Interactive map of West Norwegian Fjords
- Location: Norway
- Criteria: (vii) (viii)
- Reference: 1195
- Coordinates: 60°57′57″N 6°58′40″E

The West Norwegian Fjords is the common name of two fjords in Norway listed as a World Heritage Site by UNESCO: the Geirangerfjord and the Nærøyfjord.

== Geography ==
=== Location ===
The World Heritage Site consists of two areas 120 kilometres (75 mi) apart, located in south-west Norway, north-west of the city of Bergen, and part of the fjord landscape of western Norway extending over 500 kilometres (310 mi) between Stavanger in the south and Åndalsnes in the north. The areas of Geirangerfjord and Nærøyfjord total 122,712 hectares (1,227 km^{2}; 474 mi^{2}), including 111,966 hectares (1,120 km^{2}; 432 mi^{2}) on land and 10,746 hectares (107 km^{2}; 41 mi^{2}) of water.

The Geirangerfjord area is situated 60 kilometres (37 mi) inland and constitutes the Geirangerfjord itself as the upper end of Storfjorden as well as Tafjorden. The heritage site lies within Møre og Romsdal county and includes parts of Fjord Municipality and Stranda Municipality. It covers 51,802 hectares (518 km^{2}; 200 mi^{2}) including 46,151 hectares (462 km^{2}; 178 mi^{2}) on land and 5,651 hectares (57 km^{2}; 22 mi^{2}) of water.

The Nærøyfjord is situated 100 kilometres (62 mi) inland and is the upper extremity of Sognefjord. It lies in Vestland county and includes parts of Aurland Municipality, Vik Municipality, Lærdal Municipality, and Voss Municipality. In total it covers 70,910 hectares (709 km^{2}; 274 mi^{2}) of which 65,815 hectares (658 km^{2}; 254 mi^{2}) is on land and 5,095 hectares (51 km^{2}; 20 mi^{2}) are water. It is crossed by European route E16.

=== Climate ===
The two areas, though relatively distant, have a very similar climate, which is a transition between oceanic and continental climates. The region is favourable to microclimates. Snow persists from October to the end of May in the mountains and the end of November to March in the valleys. In winter, the sources of the fjords are frozen for a period of one to three weeks.

== Human presence ==
The area of Geirangerfjord had 230 inhabitants as of 2003, while Nærøyfjord had 243 inhabitants as of 2001.

== See also ==
- List of Norwegian fjords
- Geirangerfjord
- Nærøyfjord
- World Heritage Centre
