= Geiranger =

Village in Stranda Municipality, Norway

- Village
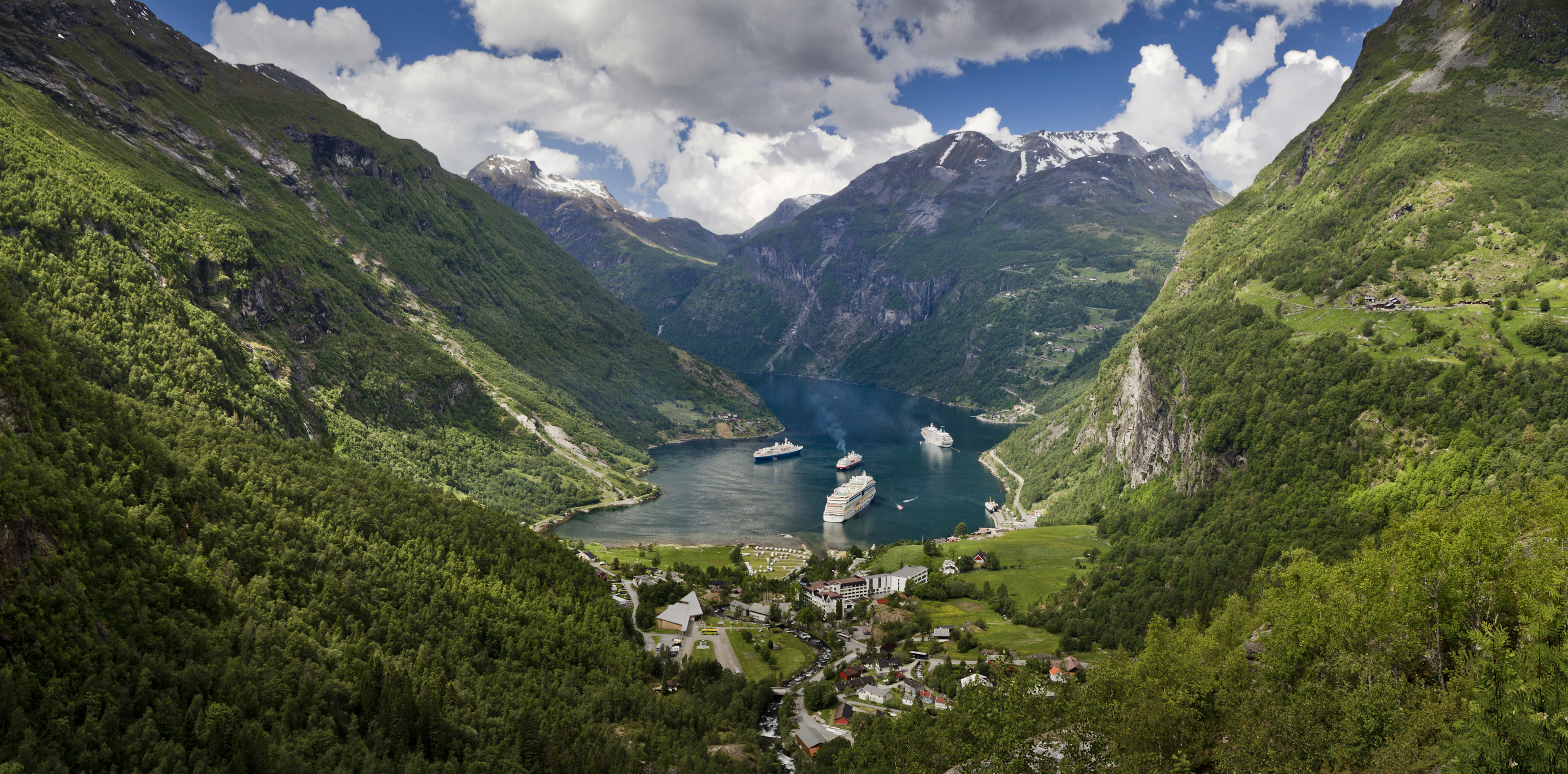
- Geiranger and Geirangerfjord from Flydalsjuvet
- Interactive map of Geiranger
- Location within Møre og Romsdal Location within Norway
- Coordinates: 62.1019°N 7.2072°E
- Country: Norway
- Region: Western Norway
- County: Møre og Romsdal
- District: Sunnmøre
- Municipality: Stranda Municipality

Area
  - Total: 0.34 km^{2} (0.13 sq mi)
- Elevation: 16 m (52 ft)

Population (2023)
  - Total: 215
  - Density: 632/km^{2} (1,640/sq mi)
- Time zone: UTC+01:00 (CET)
  - Summer (DST): UTC+02:00 (CEST)
- Post Code: 6216 Geiranger

Geiranger is a small tourist village in Sunnmøre region of Møre og Romsdal county in the western part of Norway. It is located in Stranda Municipality and at the end of the Geirangerfjorden, which is a branch of the large Storfjorden. The nearest city is Ålesund. Geiranger is home to spectacular scenery, and has been named the best travel destination in Scandinavia by Lonely Planet. Since 2005, the Geirangerfjord area has been listed as a UNESCO World Heritage Site.

Norwegian County Road 63 passes through the village and the Geiranger–Hellesylt Ferry stops at the village too. Geiranger Church is the main church for the village and surrounding area. The 0.34-square-kilometre (84-acre) village had a population (2023) of 215 and a population density of 632 inhabitants per square kilometre (1,640/sq mi). Since 2000, the population and area data for this village area has not been separately tracked by Statistics Norway.

Geiranger is under constant threat from landslides from the mountain Åkerneset into the fjord. A collapse would cause a megatsunami that could destroy the village of Geiranger. For this reason, sirens have been installed to warn residents if a landslide should occur.

== Name ==
The Old Norse form of the name was Geirangr. The suffix angr (which can mean "fjord") is a common element in Norwegian place names (such as Hardanger and Varanger). The first element could be the plural genitive of the Old Norse word geiri (which means "a piece of land" or "a field in a mountain side") which is related to the Middle English word gore (meaning a "spear-shaped piece of land"). This would then refer to the several small farms and fields lying in the steep mountain sides around the fjord (such as Knivsflå and Skageflå).

== Tourism ==
This third biggest cruise ship port in Norway, Geiranger receives 140 to 180 ships during the four-month tourist season. In 2012 some 300,000 cruise passengers visited Geiranger during the summer season. The Geiranger Port has a cruise terminal, a Seawalk, and 3–4 anchor positions depending on the size of the ships. Constructed in 2013, the Seawalk is a three-segment articulated floating pier. It is 236 metres (774 ft) long and 4.5 metres (15 ft) wide on 10 pontoons, which moves (like a floatable jetwalk) to accommodate up to 4,000 passengers per hour disembarking from a single ship.

Several hundred thousand people pass through the village every summer, and tourism is the main business for the 250 people who live there permanently. There are four hotels and over ten camping sites. The tourist season stretches from May to early September. Tours of the nearby historic farms of Knivsflå and Skageflå are available from Geiranger. The Seven Sisters waterfall is located just west of Geiranger, directly across another waterfall called "The Suitor."

Each year in June, the Geiranger – From Fjord to Summit event occurs. It comprises a half marathon run and a bicycle race, both starting from the sea level at the fjord and ending at the 1,497-metre (4,911 ft) summit of Mount Dalsnibba, near the lake Djupvatnet. Since there is still a lot of snow left in the mountains at that time of year, the race is also called "From Summer to Winter".

Nearest airport is Ørsta-Volda Airport, Hovden around 1 hour and 50 min away.

In 2025 a new floating quay was built that included enough power to allow ships of up to 400 passengers to plug in and turn off their engines with a view to preserving air quality

== Media gallery ==
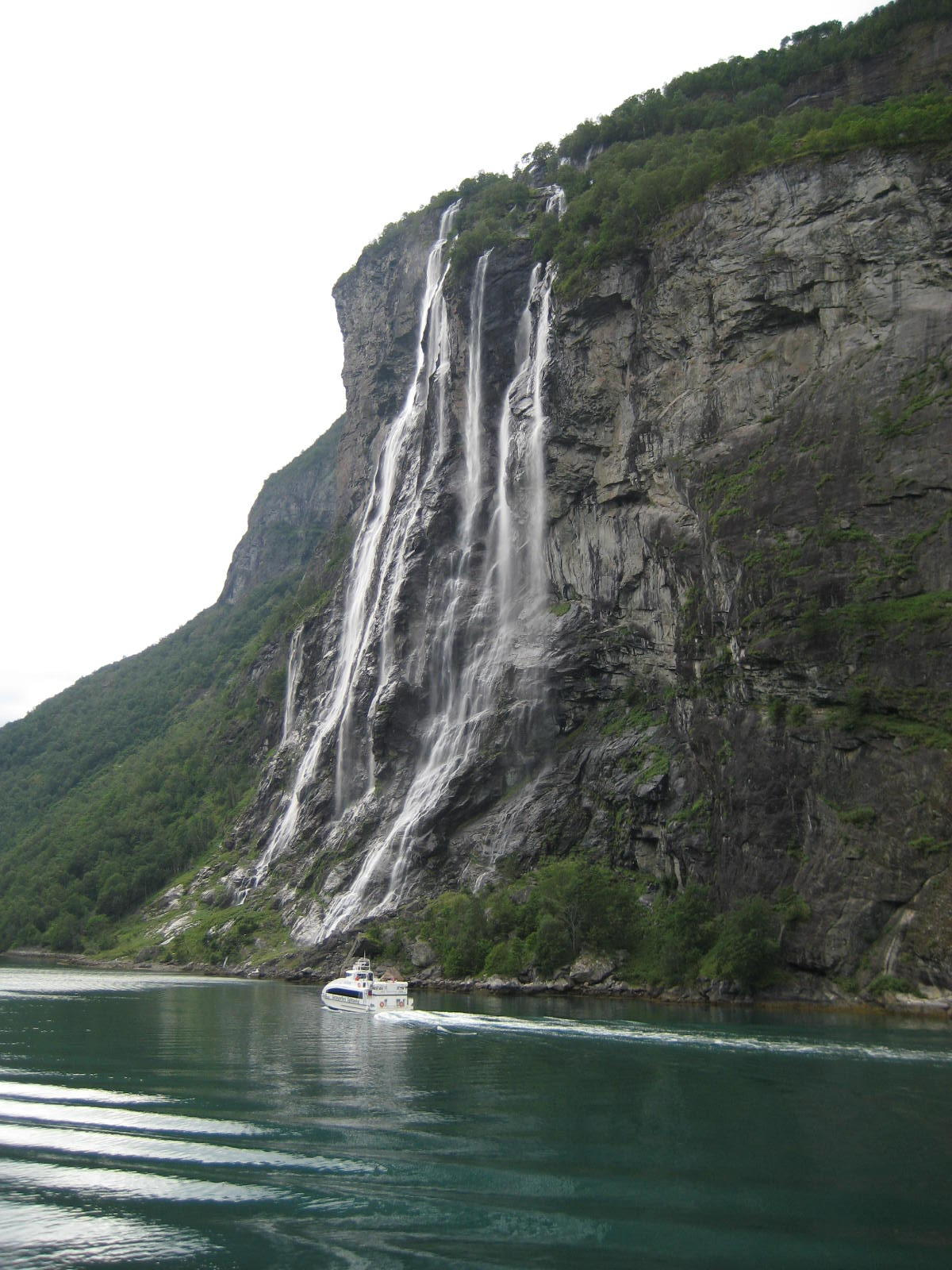
The seven sisters waterfall over Geirangerfjord

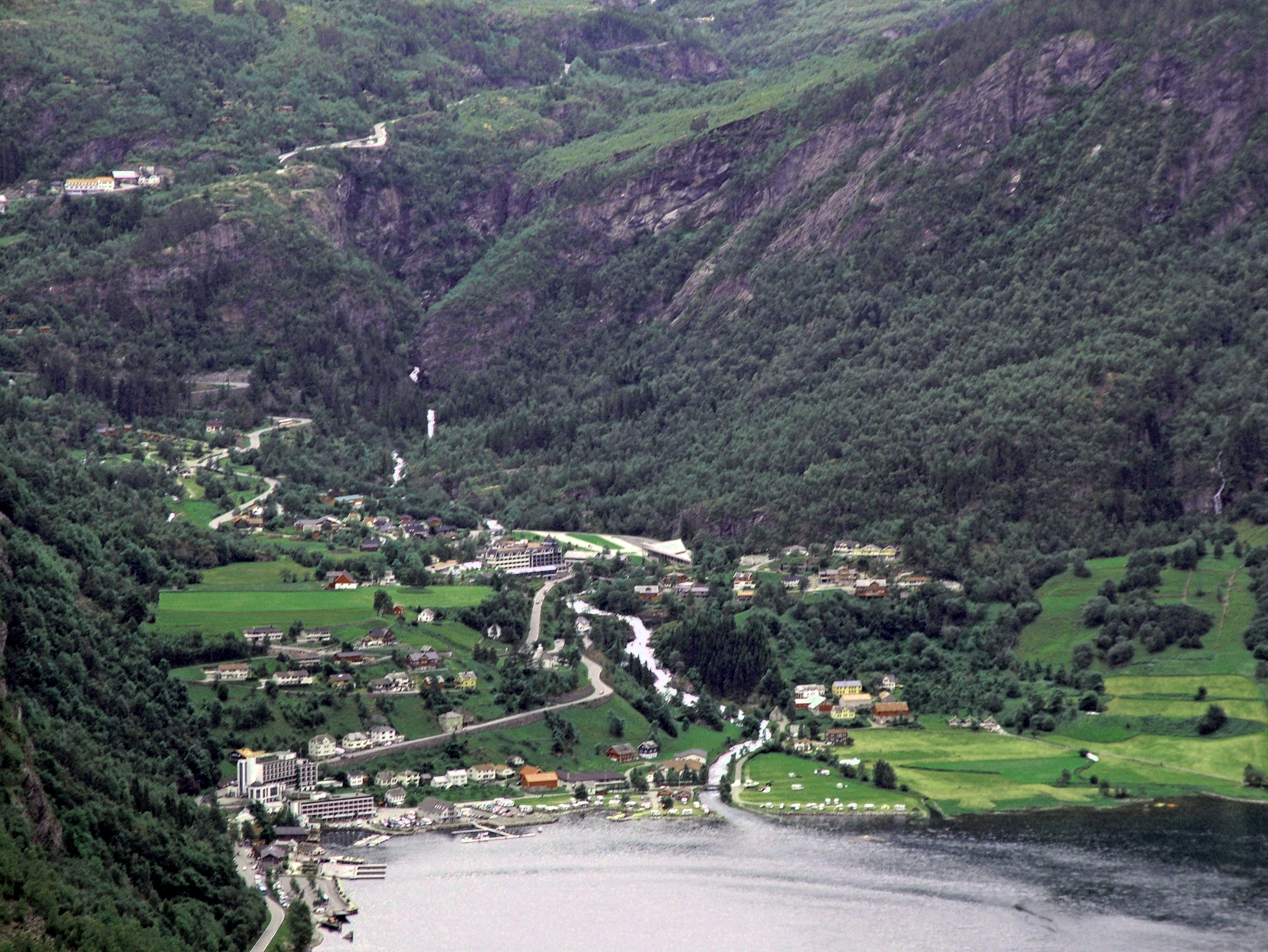
View of the village of Geiranger

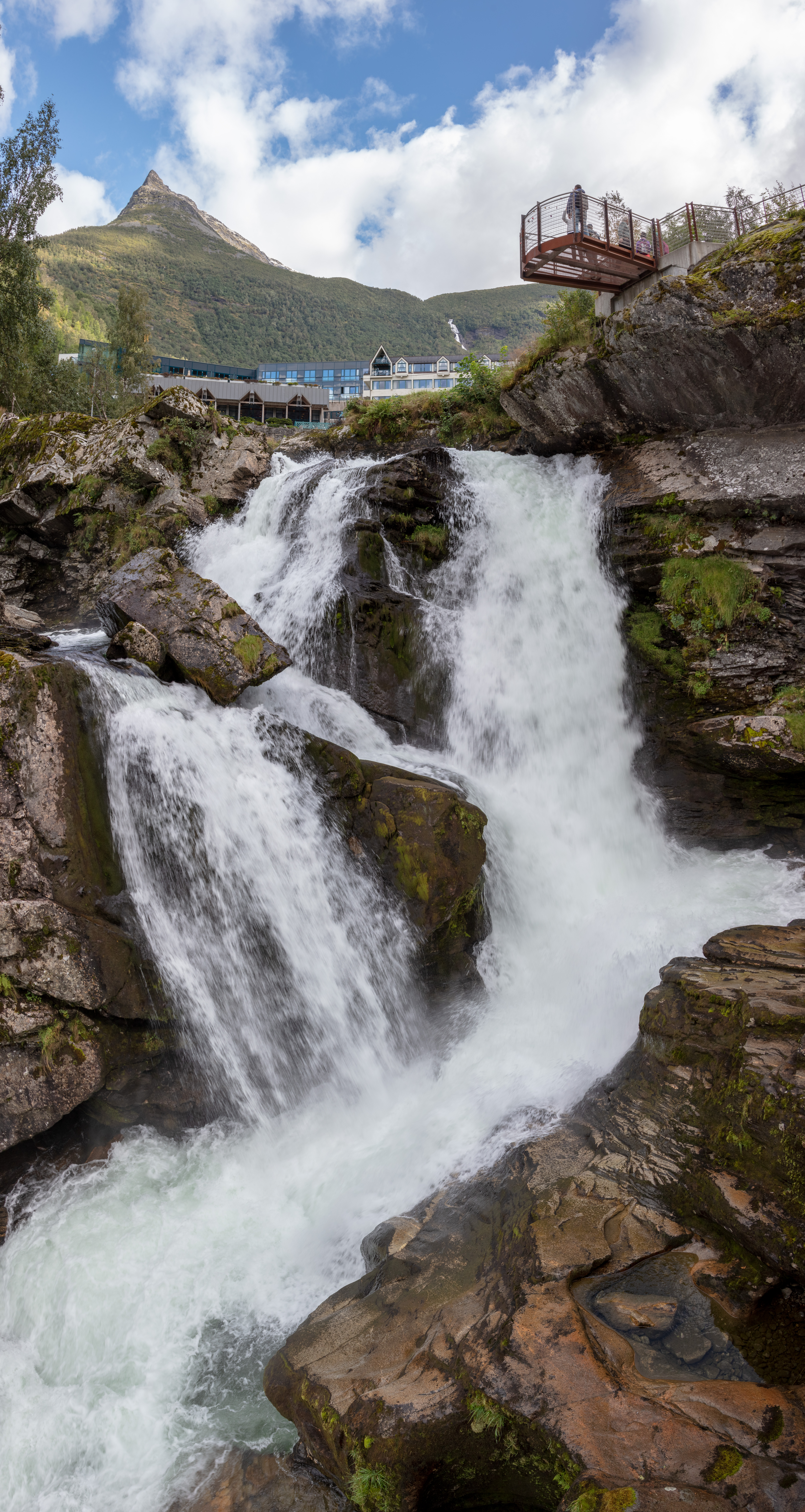
Storfossen falls in Geiranger

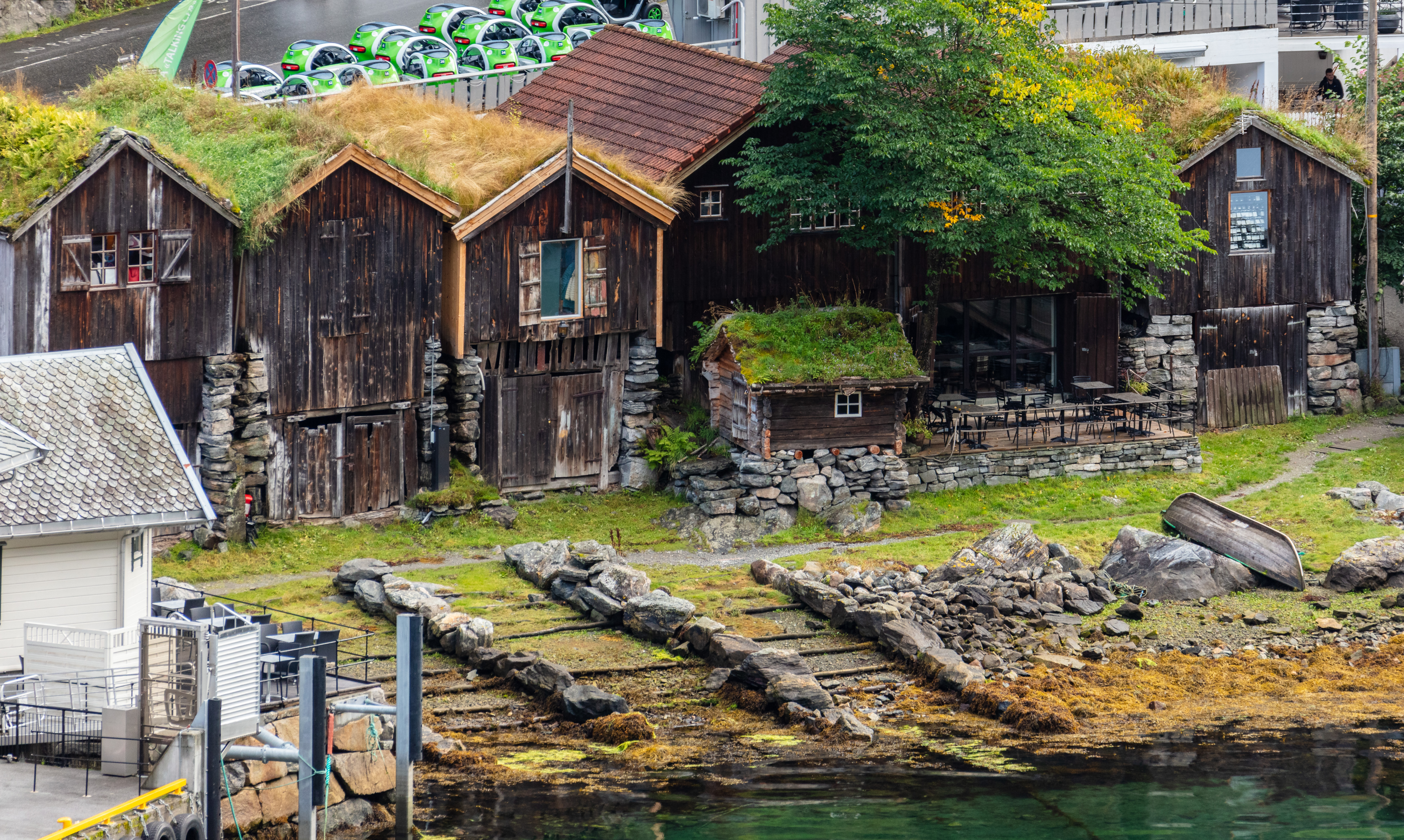
Fishermen houses

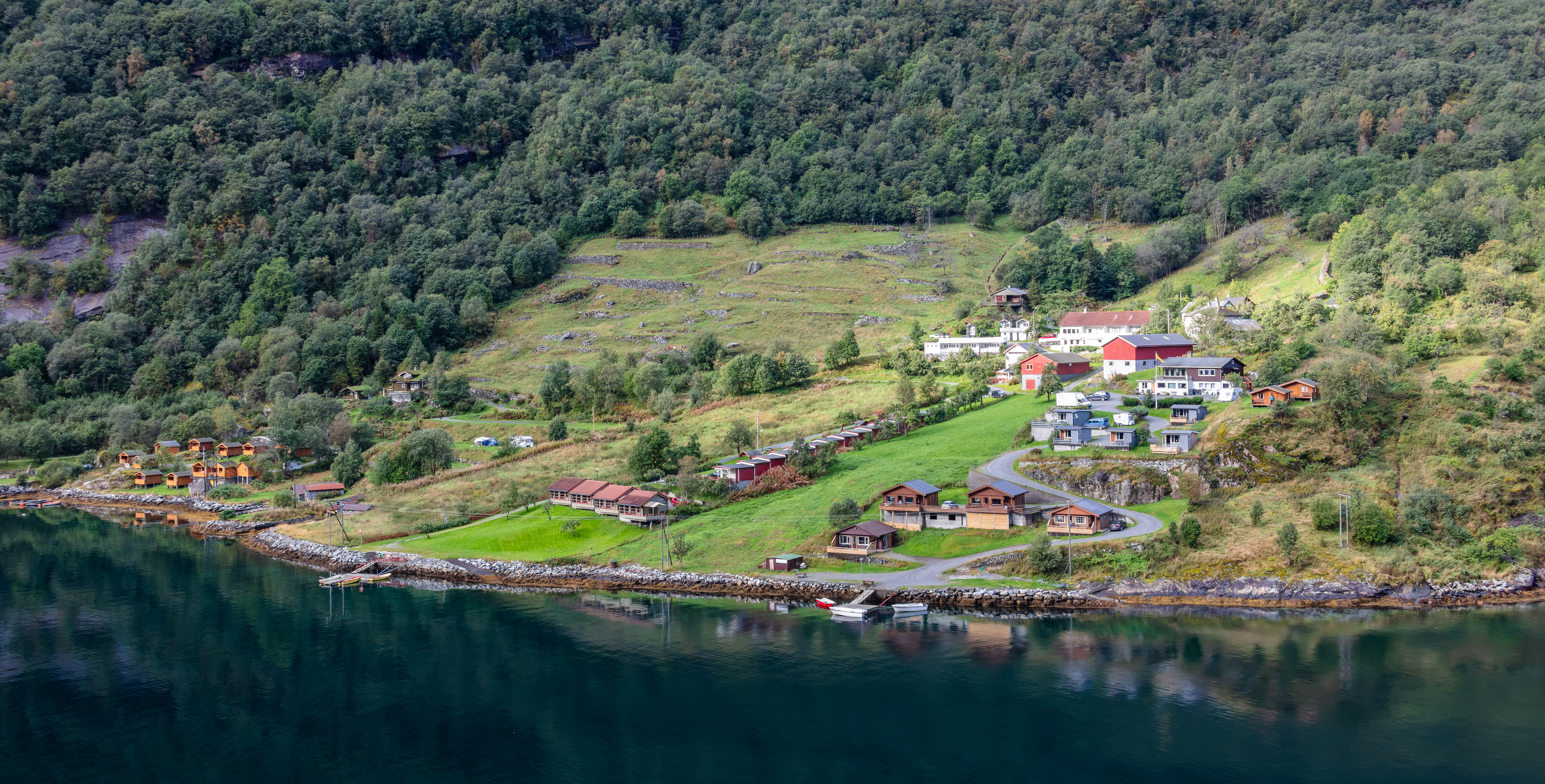
Cabins around Geiranger

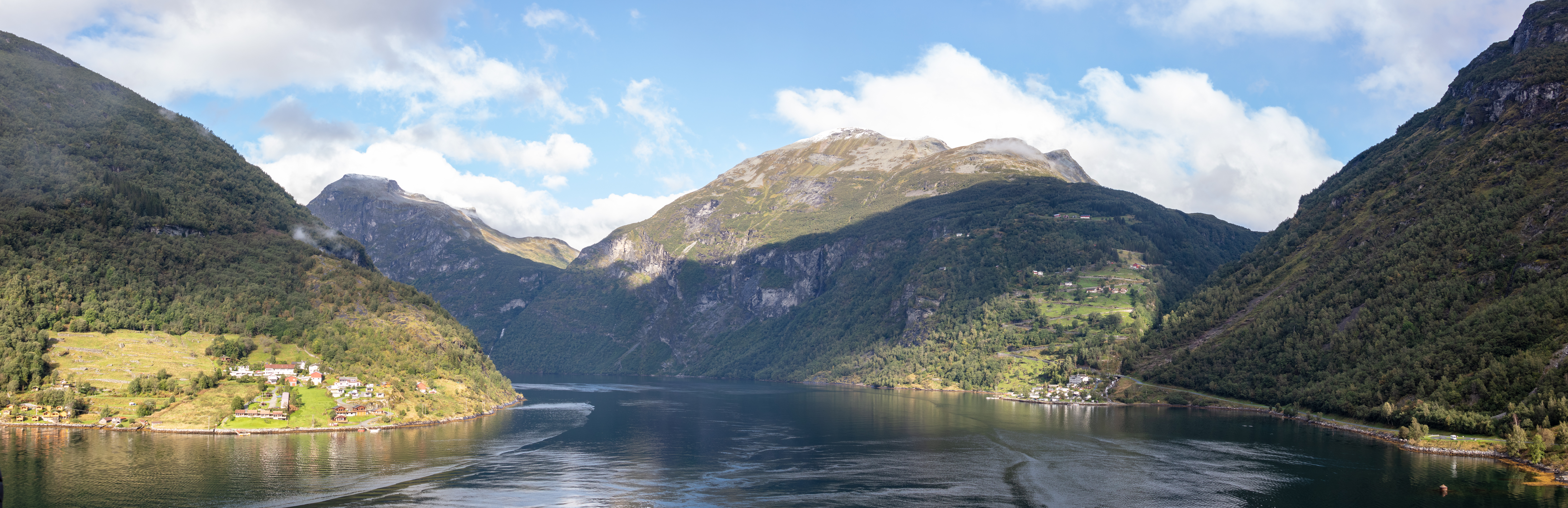
View of the Geirangerfjord

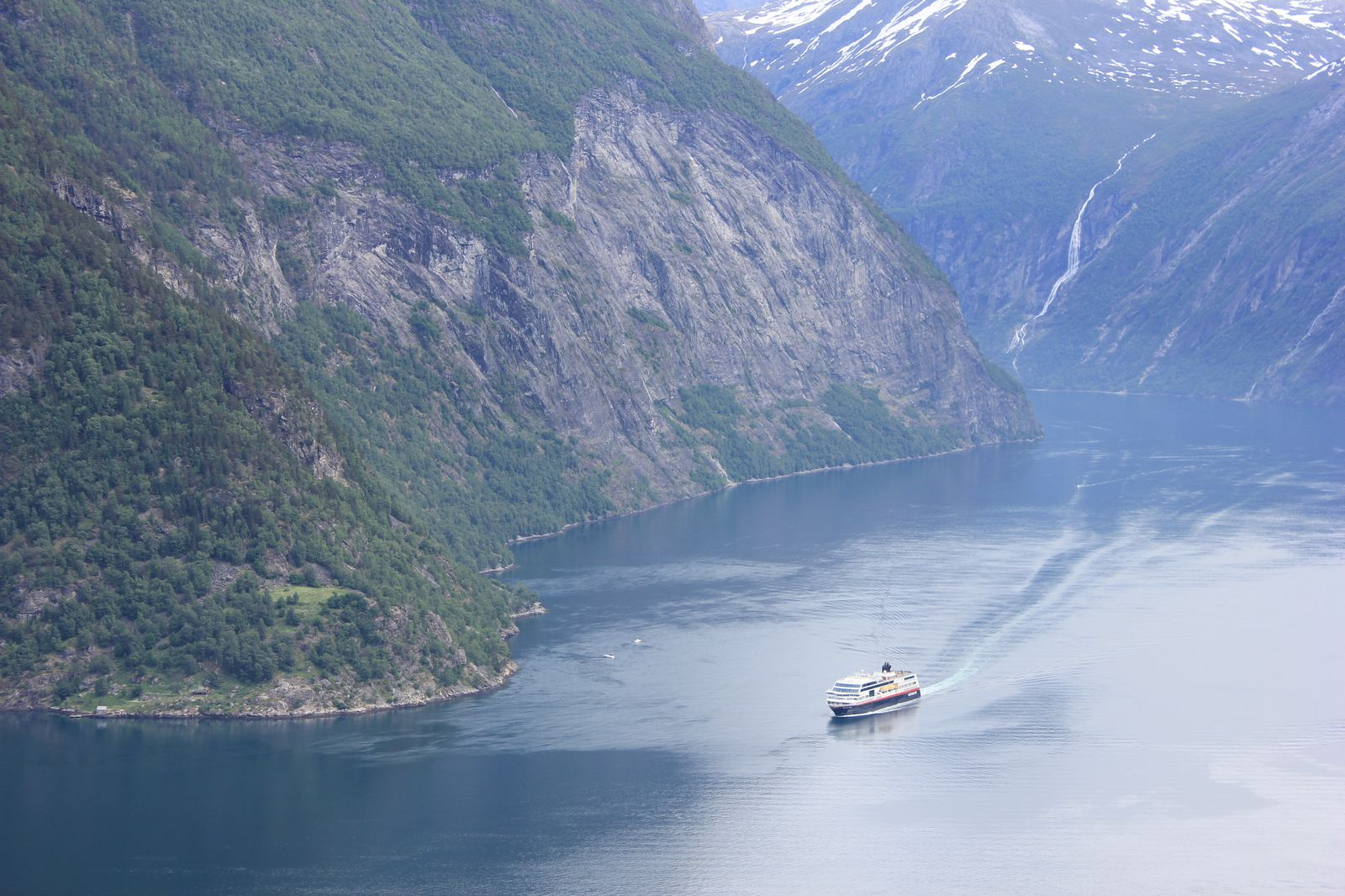
The coastal express passes the old fjord farm Lundaneset

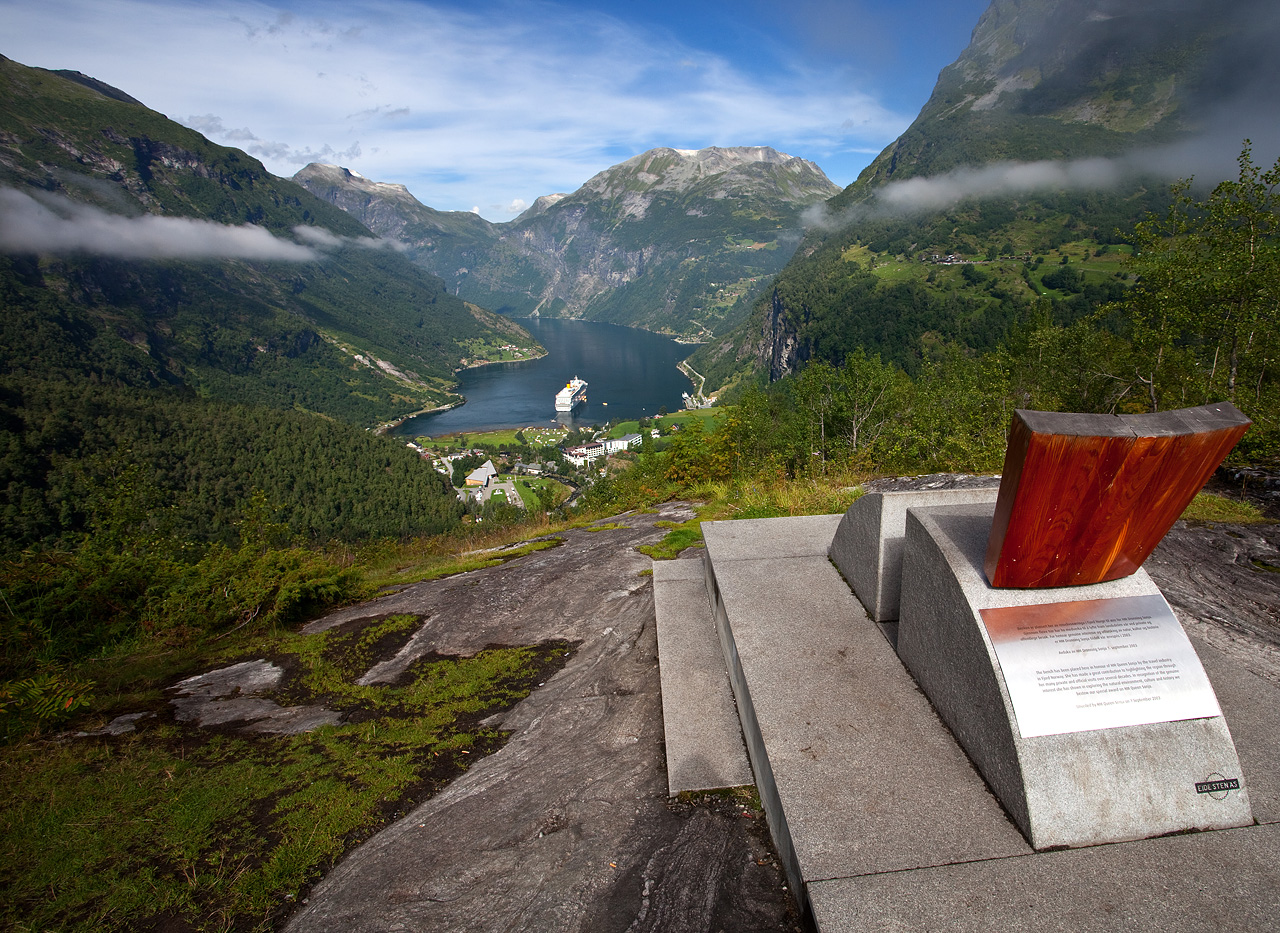
View of the fjord and of Geiranger from Flydalsjuvet

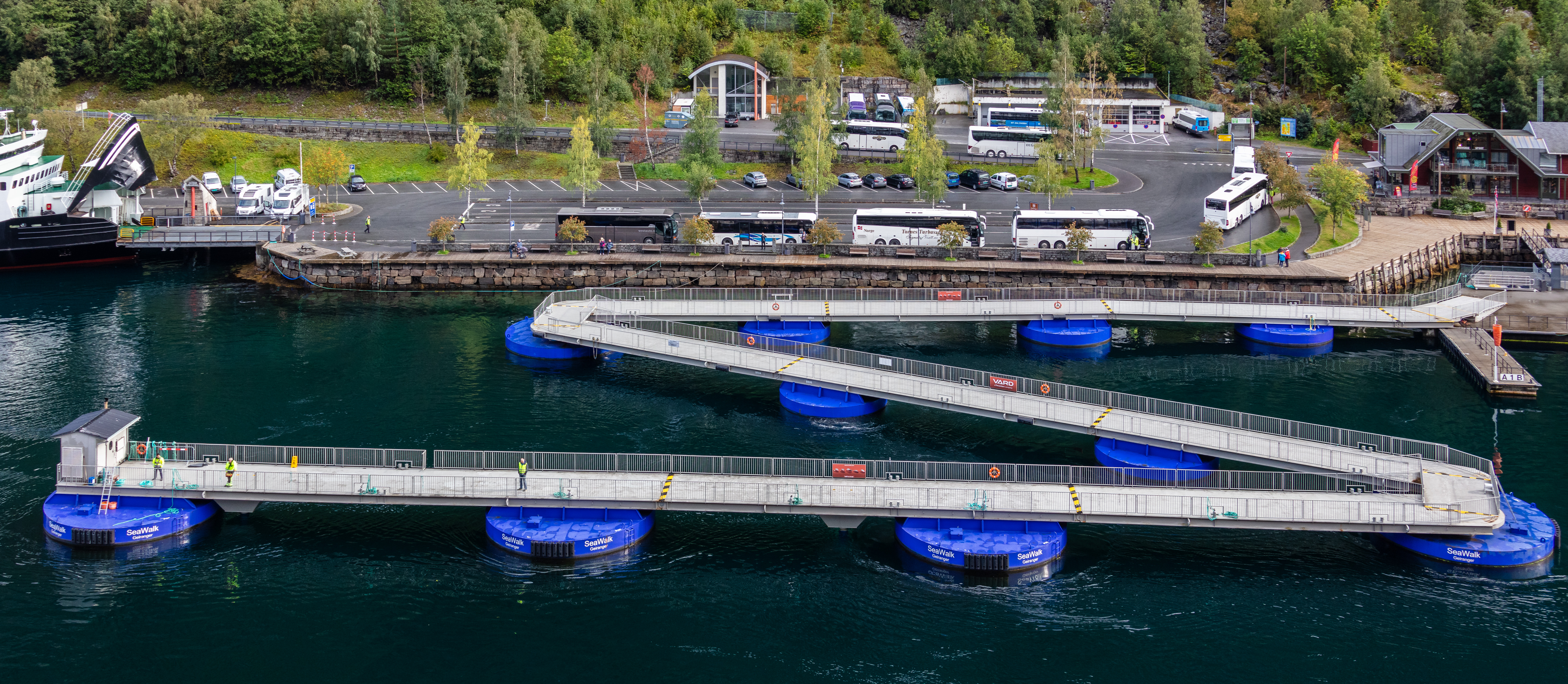
Geiranger movable Seawalk on pontoons

== In popular culture ==
- Released in August 2015, The Wave (Norwegian: Bølgen) is a Norwegian disaster movie based on the premise of a rock slide from the mountain Åkerneset inundating the town of Geiranger. A sequel, The Quake (Norwegian: Skjelvet) was released in 2018.
