= Geirangerfjord =

Fjord in Møre og Romsdal, Norway

Geirangerfjorden
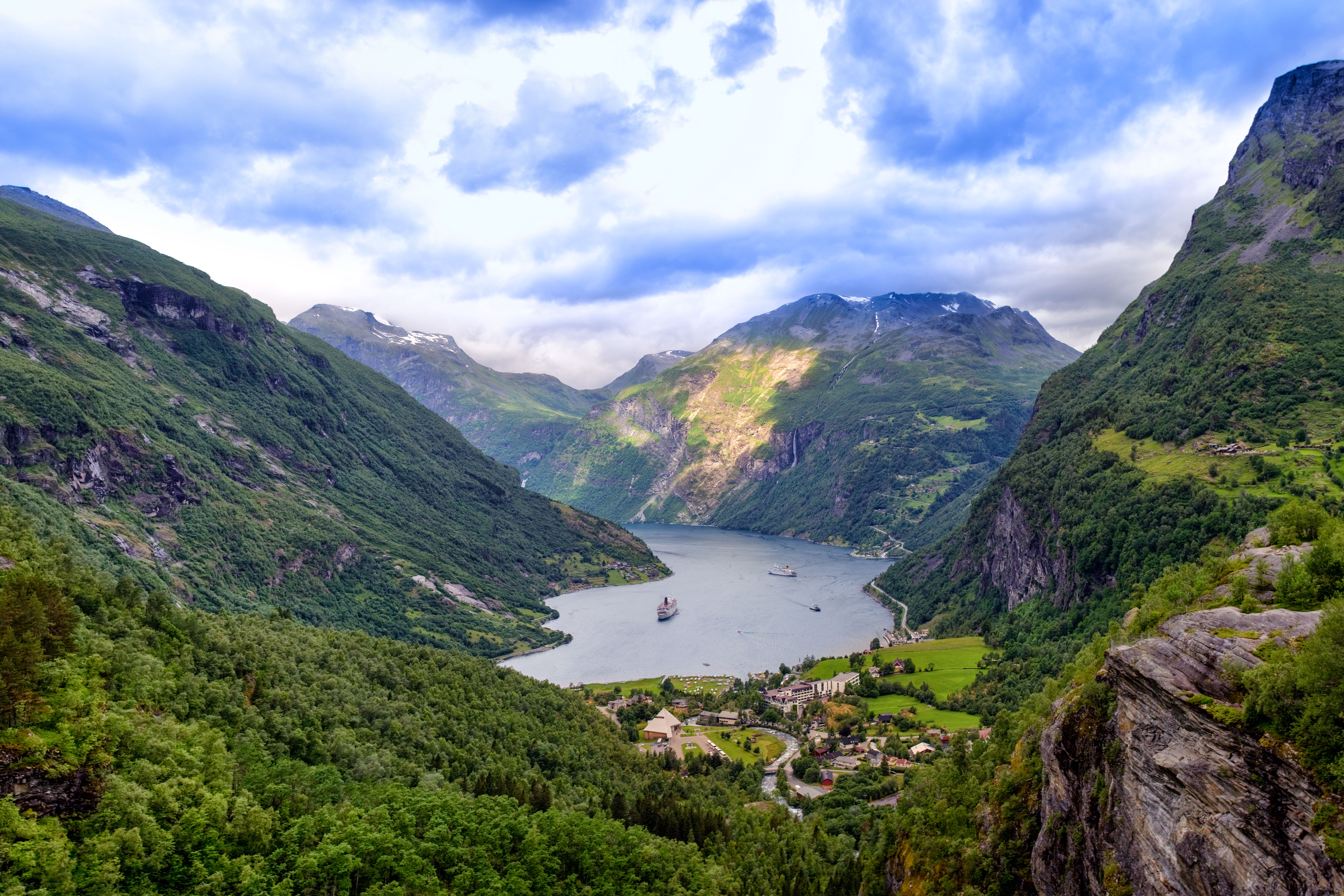
- View of the fjord
- Interactive map of the fjord
- Location: Møre og Romsdal county, Norway
- Coordinates: 62.1210°N 7.1290°E
- Type: Fjord
- Primary inflows: Geirangelva river
- Primary outflows: Sunnylvsfjorden
- Basin countries: Sunnmøre, Norway
- Max. length: 15 km (9.3 mi)
- Max. width: 1.5 km (0.93 mi)
- Settlements: Geiranger

UNESCO World Heritage Site
- Official name: West Norwegian Fjords: Geirangerfjord and Nærøyfjord
- Type: Natural
- Criteria: vii, viii
- Designated: 2005 (29th session)
- Reference no.: 1195
- Region: Europe

Geirangerfjorden (Norwegian) or Geiranger Fjord (English) is a fjord in the Sunnmøre region of Møre og Romsdal county, Norway. It is located entirely in Stranda Municipality. It is a 15-kilometre-long (9 1/2 mi) branch off the Sunnylvsfjorden, which itself is a branch off the Storfjorden (lit. 'Great Fjord'). The small village of Geiranger is located at the end of the fjord where the Geirangelva river empties into it.

== The fjord ==
The fjord is one of Norway's most visited tourist sites. In 2005, it was listed as a UNESCO World Heritage Site, jointly with the Nærøyfjorden as the "West Norwegian Fjords" site. This status was challenged by the disputed plans to build power lines across the fjord.

The Geiranger–Hellesylt Ferry, a car ferry which doubles as a sightseeing trip, is operated by Fjord1 Nordvestlandske. It runs lengthwise along the fjord between the small towns of Geiranger and Hellesylt. The fjord is scheduled to require zero-emissions ships in 2026.

Along the fjord's sides there lie a number of now-abandoned farms. Some restoration has been made by the Storfjordens venner association. The most commonly visited among these are Skageflå, Knivsflå, and Blomberg. Skageflå may also be reached on foot from Geiranger, while the others require a boat excursion. The fjord is also host to several waterfalls such as Seven Sisters Falls.

Magdalene Thoresen, Henrik Ibsen's mother-in-law, said of the area:

This fjord is surrounded by some of the steepest mountains on the entire west coast. It is very narrow and has no habitable shore area, for the precipitous heights rise in sheer and rugged strata almost straight out of the water. Foaming waterfalls plunge into the fjord from jagged peaks. There are, however, a few mountain farms here, and of these one or two have such hazardous access, by paths that wind around steep precipices, and by bridges that are fixed to the mountain with iron bolts and rings, that they bear witness in a most striking way to the remarkable powers of invention which the challenges of nature have developed in man.

== Waterfalls ==
The two most notable waterfalls along the fjord are Seven Sisters Falls and the Suitor (Nynorsk: Friaren). Both falls face one another across the fjord, and the Suitor is said to be trying to woo the sisters opposite.

The Bridal Veil is another waterfall in the fjord, so named because it falls delicately over one rocky edge, and when seen backlit by the sun it has the appearance of a thin veil over the rocks.

== Rock slides ==
The fjord is under constant threat from the mountain Åkerneset which is about to erode into the fjord. A collapse would produce a megatsunami, hitting several nearby towns including Geiranger and Hellesylt in about ten minutes.

== In popular culture ==
- The 2015 movie The Wave (Bølgen) is based on the premise of a rock slide from the mountain Åkerneset inundating the town of Geiranger.
- Frozen used the landscapes of the Geirangerfjord and Nærøyfjord as basis for the landscapes of Arendelle.

== Gallery ==
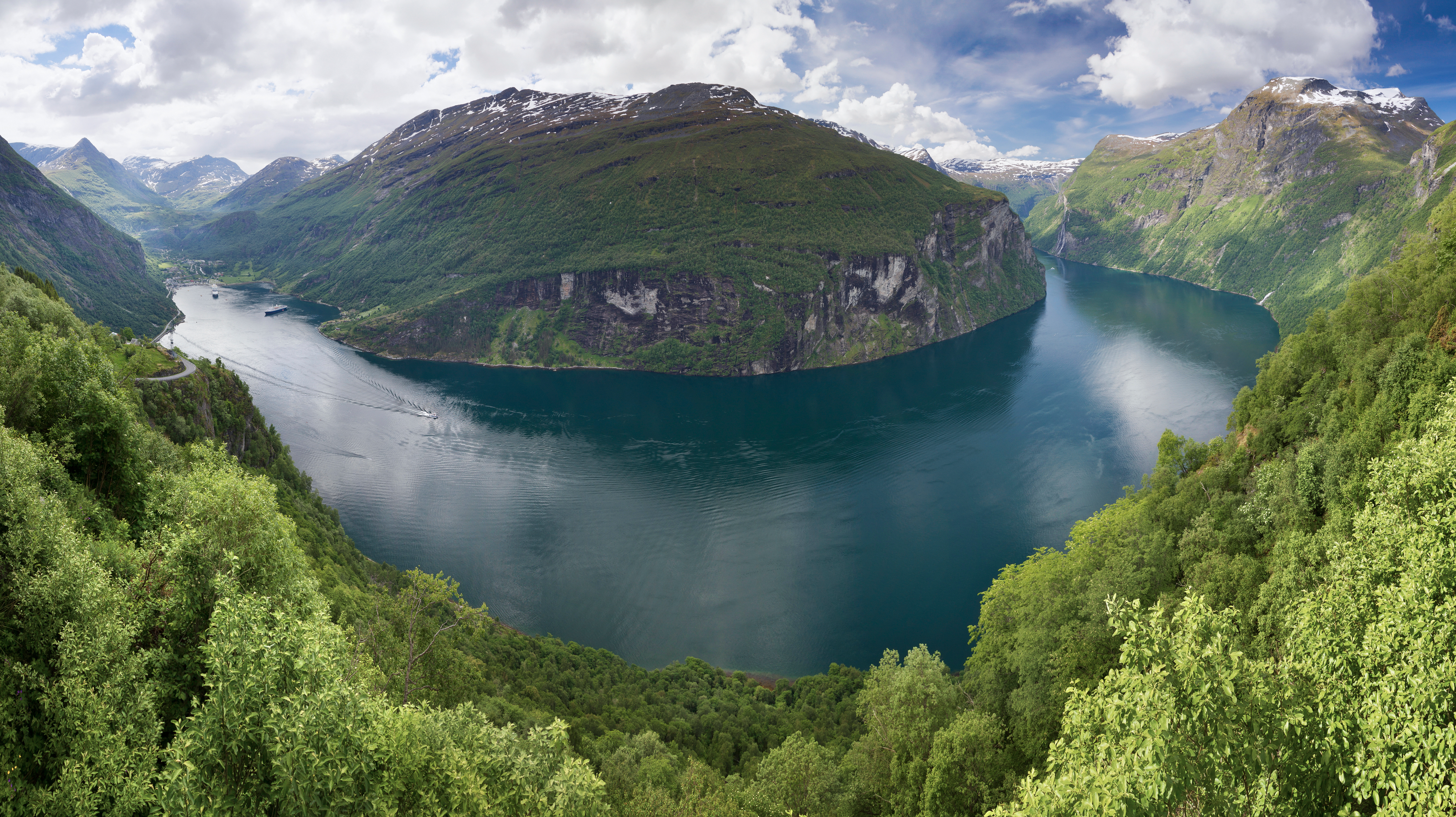
The Geiranger Fjord is a UNESCO World Heritage Site

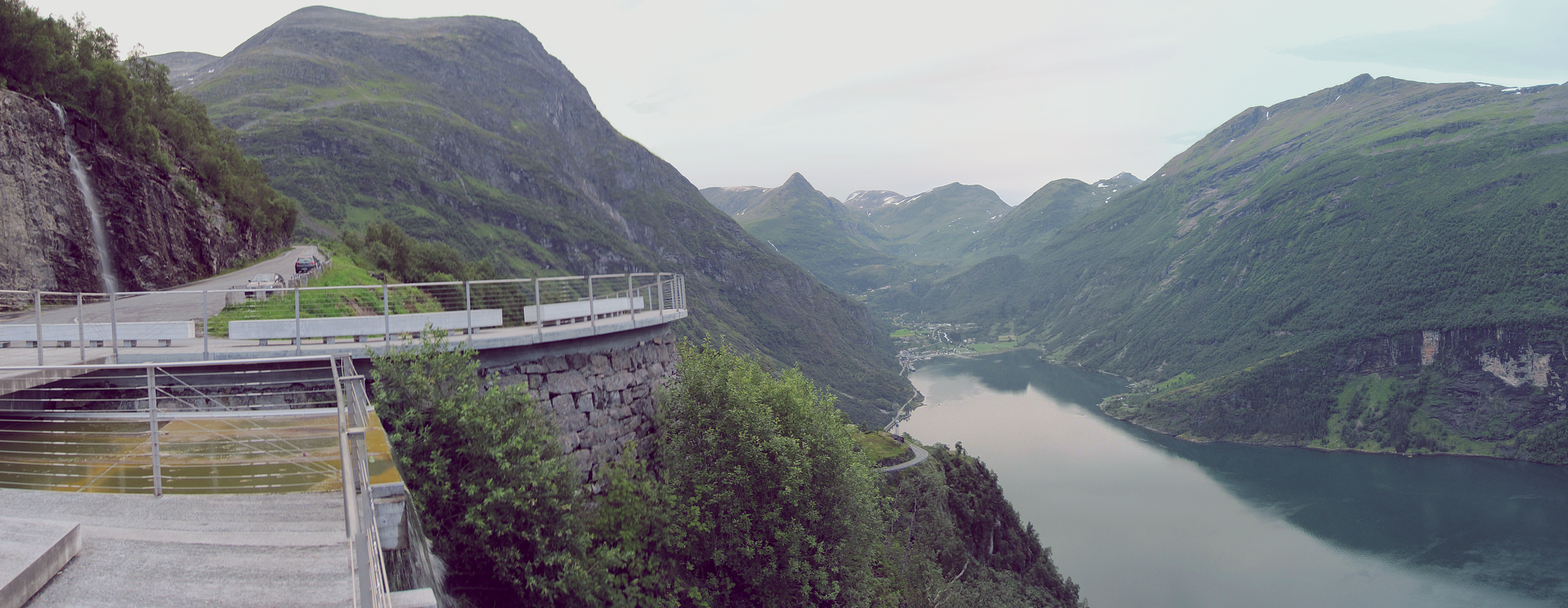
Geiranger fjord from climb parking lot (panorama)

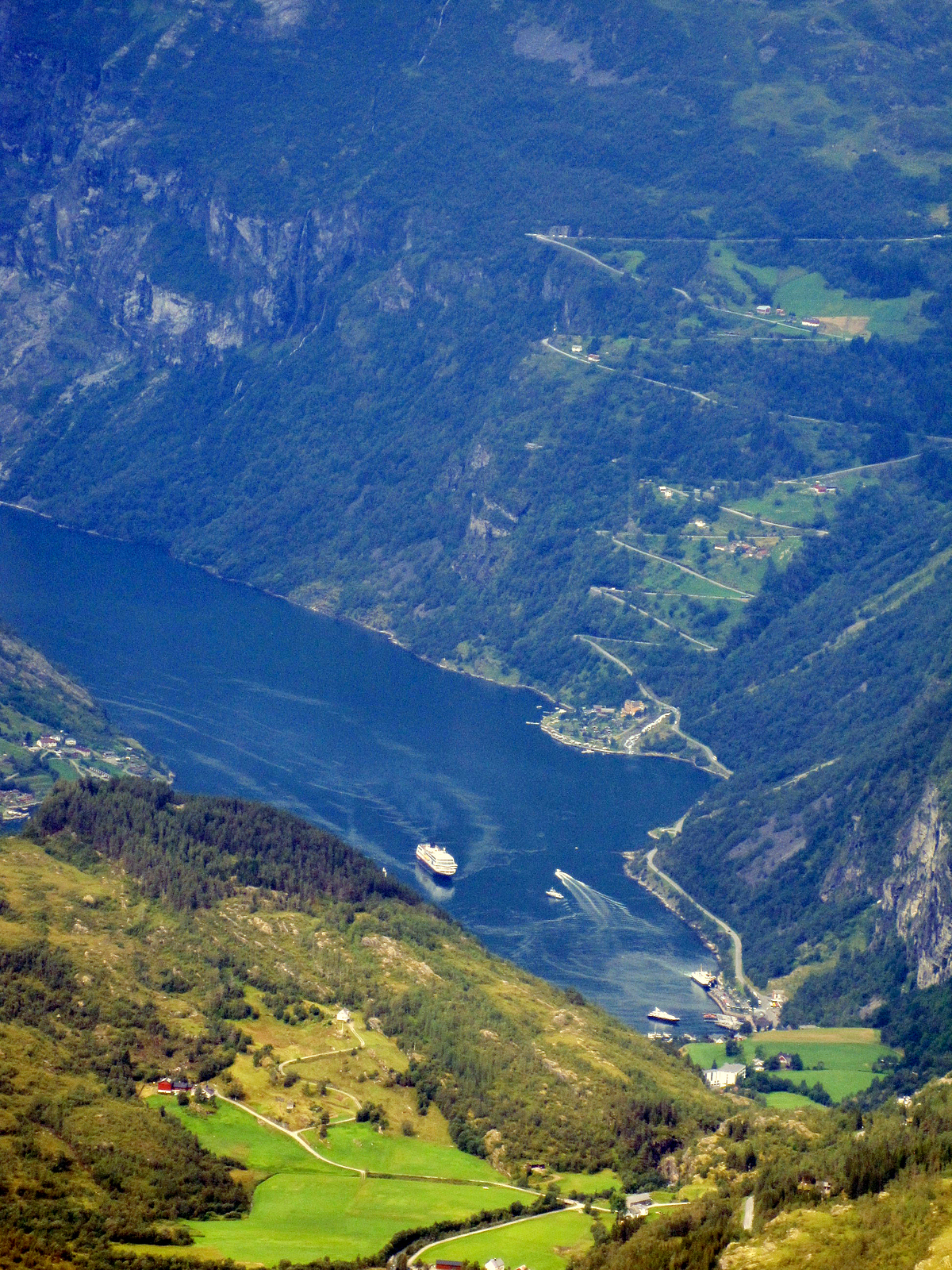
Geiranger fjord from Dalsnibba

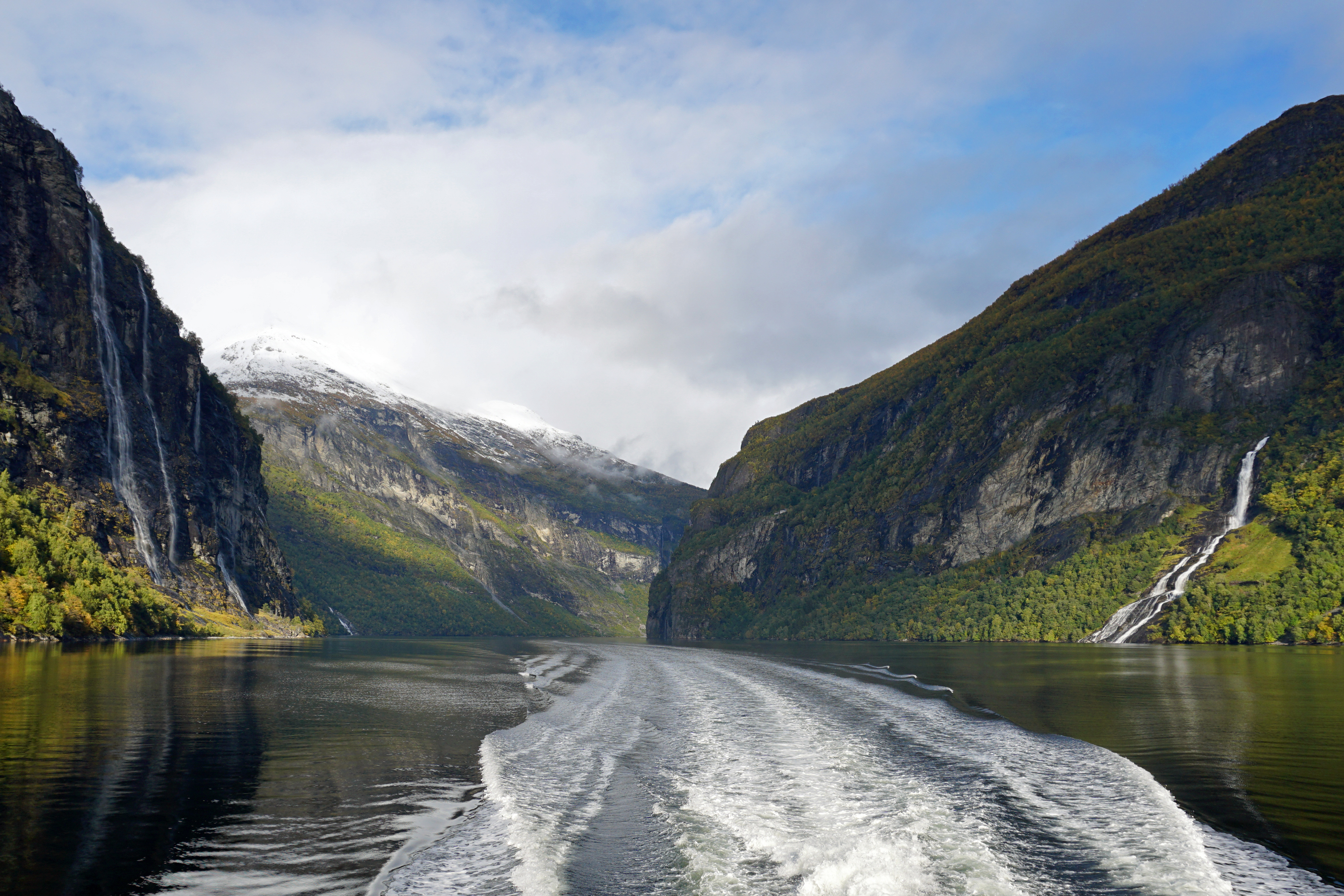
Seven Sisters (De syv søstrene) and the Suitor (Friaren) waterfalls.

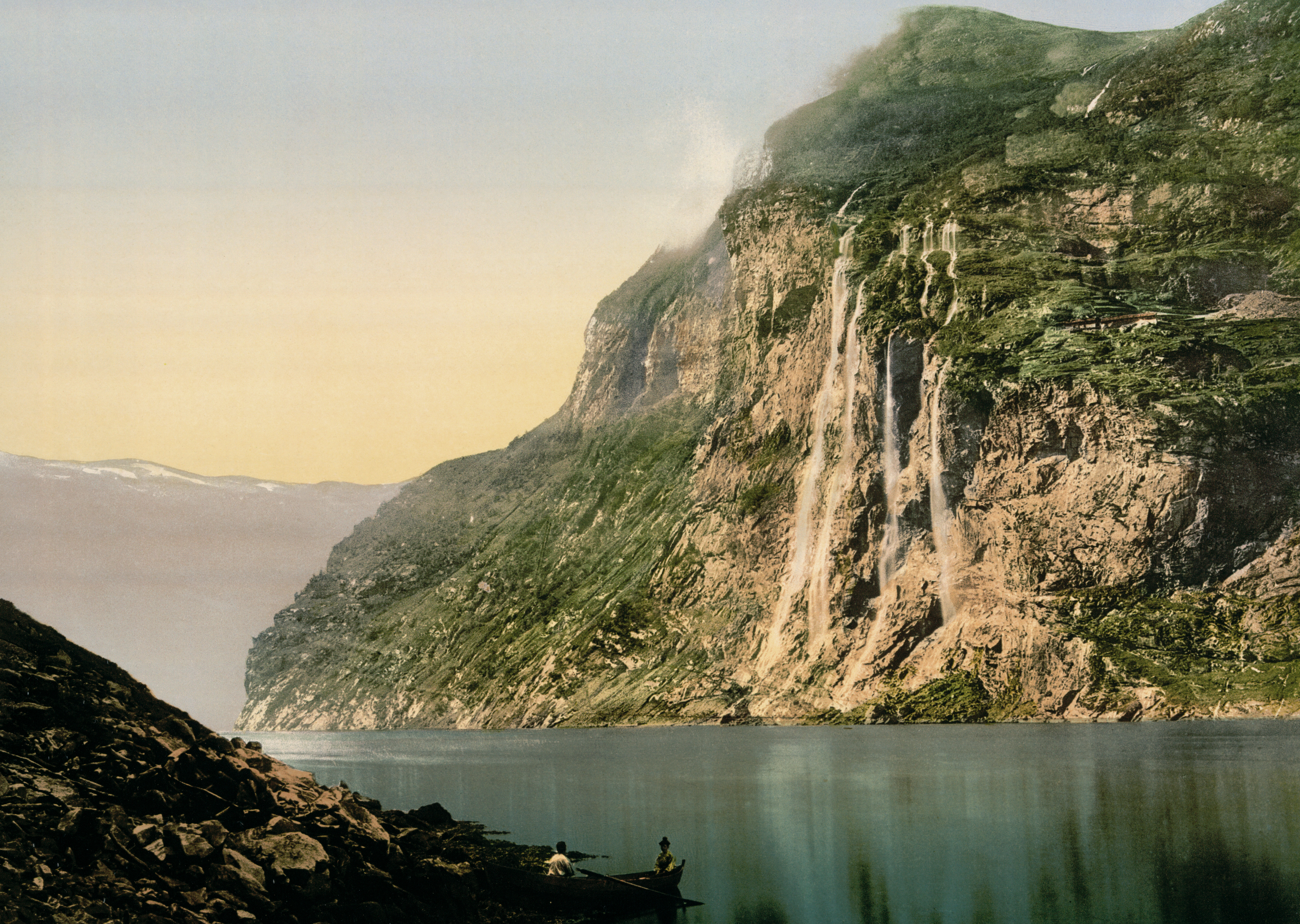
A historical photograph of the fjord with Seven Sisters Falls

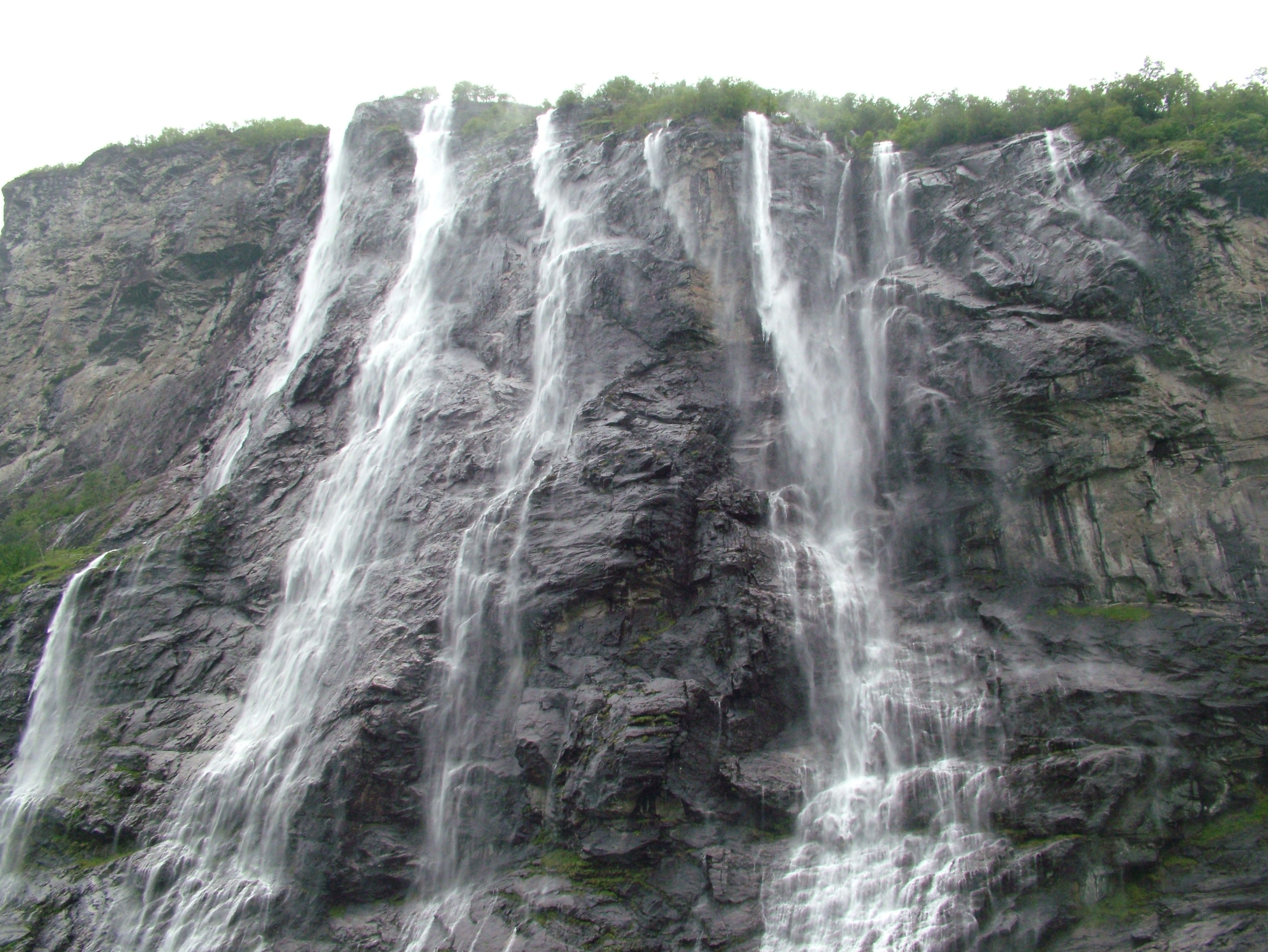
Seven Sisters Falls making its way to the Geiranger Fjord
