= List of villages in Møre og Romsdal =

This is a list of villages in Møre og Romsdal, a county of Norway. The list excludes towns and cities located in Møre og Romsdal. Villages that are the administrative centre of their municipality are marked (†).

Place	Coordinates	Postal Code	Municipality
Alnes	62°29′09″N 5°58′27″E	6055	Giske
Angvika	62°53′37″N 8°05′20″E	6636	Gjemnes
Aukrasanden (†)	62°47′28″N 6°55′06″E	6480	Aukra
Aure (†)	63°16′04″N 8°31′53″E	6690	Aure
Aure	62°23′28″N 6°34′49″E	6230	Sykkylven
Aureosen	62°48′45″N 7°06′09″E	6408	Hustadvika
Austnes	62°38′12″N 6°16′16″E	6290	Haram
Batnfjordsøra (†)	62°53′34″N 7°40′54″E	6631	Gjemnes
Boggestranda	62°44′18″N 8°04′55″E	6460	Molde
Brandal	62°24′03″N 6°00′30″E	6062	Hareid
Brattvåg (†)	62°36′01″N 6°26′36″E	6270	Haram
Bremsnes	63°05′19″N 7°39′41″E	6530	Averøy
Bringsinghaug	62°12′11″N 5°25′09″E	6087	Sande
Bruhagen (†)	63°03′06″N 7°37′55″E	6530	Averøy
Bud	62°54′24″N 6°54′48″E	6430	Hustadvika
Dravlaus	62°07′25″N 5°56′27″E	6133	Volda
Dyrkorn	62°25′18″N 6°56′46″E	6250	Fjord
Dyrnes	63°25′39″N 7°51′01″E	6570	Smøla
Eggesbønes	62°19′34″N 5°38′30″E	6092	Herøy
Eide	62°55′02″N 7°26′48″E	6493	Hustadvika
Eidsbygda	62°35′12″N 7°29′42″E	6350	Rauma
Eidsdal	62°15′40″N 7°10′18″E	6215	Fjord
Eidsvik	62°32′38″N 6°34′42″E	6264	Haram
Eidsvåg	62°46′29″N 8°03′10″E	6460	Molde
Eikesdalen	62°28′34″N 8°10′27″E	6472	Molde
Eiksund	62°15′10″N 5°54′12″E	6068	Ulstein
Elnesvågen (†)	62°51′16″N 7°08′26″E	6440	Hustadvika
Eresfjord	62°39′40″N 8°06′40″E	6470	Molde
Fiksdalen	62°37′03″N 6°51′00″E	6394	Vestnes
Fiskarstrand	62°26′23″N 6°16′18″E	6035	Sula
Fiskåbygd (†)	62°06′02″N 5°33′28″E	6143	Vanylven
Flemma	62°56′10″N 8°04′25″E	6637	Gjemnes
Flåskjer	62°16′48″N 6°01′35″E	6170	Ørsta
Folkestad	62°07′08″N 6°02′00″E	6120	Volda
Frei	63°01′28″N 7°48′27″E	6524	Kristiansund
Fyrde	62°03′47″N 6°19′31″E	6110	Volda
Geiranger	62°05′59″N 7°12′24″E	6216	Stranda
Giske	62°30′14″N 6°03′01″E	6055	Giske
Gjemnes	62°57′04″N 7°45′46″E	6633	Gjemnes
Gjerdsvika (Gjerde)	62°15′39″N 5°34′44″E	6083	Sande
Gjøra	62°32′56″N 9°06′45″E	6613	Sunndal
Glærem	62°59′28″N 8°38′11″E	6650	Surnadal
Grodås	61°58′00″N 06°31′32″E	6763	Volda
Grip	63°13′10″N 7°35′35″E	6510	Kristiansund
Grøa	62°38′38″N 8°43′48″E	6612	Sunndal
Gullstein	63°12′26″N 8°08′58″E	6590	Aure
Haddal	62°16′56″N 5°52′06″E	6064	Ulstein
Hareid (†)	62°22′17″N 6°01′35″E	6060	Hareid
Haugsbygda (Gursken)	62°13′49″N 5°37′11″E	6082	Sande
Heggem	62°52′12″N 7°53′14″E	6638	Gjemnes
Helle	62°36′36″N 6°37′34″E	6265	Haram
Hellesylt	62°05′16″N 6°51′39″E	6218	Stranda
Helsem	62°17′38″N 6°57′17″E	6200	Stranda
Hjelset	62°46′50″N 7°29′34″E	6450	Molde
Hjørungavåg	62°21′17″N 6°04′27″E	6063	Hareid
Hoelsand	62°39′41″N 8°38′41″E	6600	Sunndal
Hovland	62°29′38″N 6°11′41″E	6057	Ålesund
Hollingen	62°46′21″N 6°58′59″E	6480	Aukra
Hopen (†)	63°27′48″N 8°00′50″E	6570	Smøla
Hundeidvik	62°22′07″N 6°25′26″E	6224	Sykkylven
Hustad	62°57′21″N 7°05′20″E	6433	Hustadvika
Ikornnes	62°23′12″N 6°32′58″E	6222	Sykkylven
Indre Hornindal	61°59′52″N 06°36′19″E	6763	Volda
Innfjorden	62°29′36″N 7°33′36″E	6315	Rauma
Isfjorden	62°34′40″N 7°47′43″E	6320	Rauma
Jendem	62°47′19″N 7°00′03″E	6408	Hustadvika
Jordalsgrenda	62°46′00″N 8°19′35″E	6610	Sunndal
Kleive	62°47′43″N 7°38′02″E	6453	Molde
Kornstad	62°57′54″N 7°27′24″E	6530	Averøy
Kortgarden	62°46′39″N 7°37′12″E	6455	Molde
Kvalsund	62°20′29″N 5°35′26″E	6098	Herøy
Kvernes	63°00′23″N 7°43′31″E	6530	Averøy
Kvisvik	63°03′53″N 7°59′11″E	6674	Tingvoll
Kårvåg	63°00′49″N 7°26′36″E	6530	Averøy
Langevåg (†)	62°26′27″N 6°11′29″E	6030	Sula
Larsnes (†)	62°12′10″N 5°34′38″E	6084	Sande
Langøy	63°03′51″N 7°29′51″E	6530	Averøy
Leikong	62°14′49″N 5°46′54″E	6080	Herøy
Leira	62°07′17″N 6°35′05″E	6190	Volda
Leitebakken	62°28′47″N 6°01′45″E	6055	Giske
Liabygda	62°18′43″N 7°03′09″E	6212	Stranda
Longva	62°39′50″N 6°16′44″E	6293	Haram
Løvika	62°25′59″N 6°27′32″E	6013	Ålesund
Malme	62°47′56″N 7°13′56″E	6445	Hustadvika
Mauseidvåg	62°25′19″N 6°16′19″E	6036	Sula
Meisingset	62°51′19″N 8°16′37″E	6628	Tingvoll
Midsund	62°40′22″N 6°40′30″E	6475	Molde
Mittet	62°42′00″N 7°41′28″E	6363	Rauma
Mo	62°53′48″N 8°33′49″E	6640	Surnadal
Moltustranda	62°17′33″N 5°37′24″E	6076	Herøy
Myklebost	62°43′57″N 6°26′51″E	6488	Ålesund
Myklebost	62°05′00″N 5°44′04″E	6140	Vanylven
Myklebostad	62°43′20″N 7°56′16″E	6364	Molde
Myklebust	62°29′32″N 6°17′25″E	6057	Ålesund
Nesjestranda	62°41′50″N 7°25′54″E	6456	Molde
Nord-Heggdal	62°42′15″N 6°54′27″E	6475	Molde
Norddal	62°17′57″N 7°15′41″E	6214	Fjord
Nordre Vartdal	62°19′29″N 6°08′36″E	6170	Ørsta
Nordstrand (†)	62°30′54″N 6°07′58″E	6050	Giske
Ona	62°51′37″N 6°33′15″E	6483	Ålesund
Raudsand	62°50′07″N 8°07′24″E	6462	Molde
Rensvik	63°06′06″N 7°49′47″E	6520	Kristiansund
Roald	62°34′56″N 6°07′23″E	6040	Giske
Romfo	62°36′12″N 8°56′20″E	6613	Sunndal
Rovdane	62°10′30″N 5°44′17″E	6141	Vanylven
Råket	63°25′07″N 7°49′18″E	6570	Smøla
Røbekk	62°45′13″N 7°17′56″E	6421	Molde
Rødven	62°35′12″N 7°29′42″E	6350	Rauma
Røssøyvågen	62°49′01″N 6°48′20″E	6480	Aukra
Røvika	62°43′44″N 7°25′15″E	6456	Molde
Sande	62°14′27″N 5°26′34″E	6089	Sande
Sandshamn	62°15′16″N 5°28′38″E	6089	Sande
Sjøholt	62°29′01″N 6°48′38″E	6240	Ålesund
Skei (†)	62°58′26″N 8°43′29″E	6650	Surnadal
Skodje	62°30′08″N 6°42′12″E	6260	Ålesund
Slagnes	62°04′30″N 5°31′24″E	6146	Vanylven
Spjelkavik	62°27′22″N 6°21′24″E	6011	Ålesund
Stangvik	62°55′11″N 8°28′05″E	6642	Surnadal
Steinshamn	62°47′00″N 6°28′11″E	6487	Ålesund
Stemshaug	63°19′39″N 8°42′36″E	6690	Aure
Stordal (†)	62°22′55″N 6°59′11″E	6250	Fjord
Store-Standal	62°15′48″N 6°25′30″E	6184	Ørsta
Stranda (†)	62°18′35″N 6°56′09″E	6200	Stranda
Straumgjerde	62°20′05″N 6°35′44″E	6220	Sykkylven
Straumshamn	62°04′04″N 6°03′54″E	6120	Volda
Sundgota	62°18′57″N 5°50′26″E	6068	Ulstein
Sunndalsøra (†)	62°40′31″N 8°33′05″E	6600	Sunndal
Surnadalsøra	62°58′13″N 8°39′42″E	6650	Surnadal
Sveggen	63°06′20″N 7°35′54″E	6530	Averøy
Sylte	62°50′06″N 7°13′08″E	6440	Hustadvika
Sylte	62°17′52″N 7°15′49″E	6210	Fjord
Sylte	62°59′04″N 8°41′43″E	6650	Surnadal
Syvde	62°05′17″N 5°44′15″E	6140	Vanylven
Sølsnes	62°41′08″N 7°27′17″E	6456	Molde
Søvik	62°32′50″N 6°16′46″E	6280	Haram
Sæbø	62°12′24″N 6°28′30″E	6165	Ørsta
Sætre (Vartdal)	62°18′40″N 6°06′05″E	6170	Ørsta
Tafjord	62°13′52″N 7°24′55″E	6213	Fjord
Tennfjord	62°32′05″N 6°35′03″E	6264	Haram
Tingvollvågen (†)	62°54′27″N 8°12′19″E	6630	Tingvoll
Todalen	63°11′59″N 8°41′06″E	6690	Aure
Todalsøra	62°49′11″N 8°41′11″E	6645	Surnadal
Tomra	62°34′52″N 6°55′52″E	6393	Vestnes
Torjulvågen	62°58′29″N 8°14′33″E	6629	Tingvoll
Tornes	62°50′29″N 7°01′45″E	6443	Hustadvika
Torvikbukt	62°56′37″N 7°51′27″E	6639	Gjemnes
Trandal	62°15′41″N 6°30′12″E	6183	Ørsta
Tresfjord	62°31′38″N 7°07′36″E	6391	Vestnes
Tusvik	62°23′52″N 6°28′09″E	6224	Sykkylven
Tømmervåg	63°09′27″N 7°57′15″E	6590	Aure
Urke	62°12′46″N 6°34′01″E	6196	Ørsta
Valle	62°28′37″N 6°39′35″E	6260	Ålesund
Varhaugvika	62°48′25″N 6°53′50″E	6480	Aukra
Vatne	62°33′24″N 6°38′14″E	6265	Haram
Vebenstad	63°00′40″N 7°35′09″E	6530	Averøy
Veblungsnes	62°33′12″N 7°39′50″E	6310	Rauma
Veiholmen	63°31′08″N 7°57′12″E	6570	Smøla
Verma	62°20′36″N 8°03′35″E	6330	Rauma
Vestnes (†)	62°37′35″N 7°05′18″E	6390	Vestnes
Vevang	63°00′17″N 7°17′47″E	6494	Hustadvika
Vik	62°36′45″N 6°56′45″E	6392	Vestnes
Vikebukt	62°36′46″N 7°08′51″E	6392	Vestnes
Visnes	62°57′15″N 7°24′06″E	6493	Hustadvika
Volda (†)	62°08′51″N 6°04′27″E	6100	Volda
Voll	62°32′05″N 7°26′34″E	6386	Rauma
Vågstranda	62°36′21″N 7°19′17″E	6387	Vestnes
Ytre-Standal	62°17′54″N 6°24′35″E	6174	Ørsta
Øksendalsøra	62°43′06″N 8°25′52″E	6610	Sunndal
Øre	62°55′12″N 7°45′11″E	6631	Gjemnes
Ørsta (†)	62°12′10″N 6°07′38″E	6150	Ørsta
Åfarnes	62°39′42″N 7°30′10″E	6360	Rauma
Åheim	62°02′09″N 5°31′51″E	6146	Vanylven
Ålvund	62°50′04″N 8°30′36″E	6620	Sunndal
Ålvundeidet	62°46′11″N 8°31′51″E	6620	Sunndal
Åram	62°11′30″N 5°30′06″E	6149	Vanylven
Årset	62°17′48″N 6°05′43″E	6170	Ørsta
Årset	62°29′55″N 6°22′48″E	6057	Ålesund
Åsskard	63°01′07″N 8°29′42″E	6644	Surnadal

== See also ==
- For other counties, see the lists of villages in Norway
