= Saudehornet =

Mountain in Sunnmøre, Norway

- Sauehornet
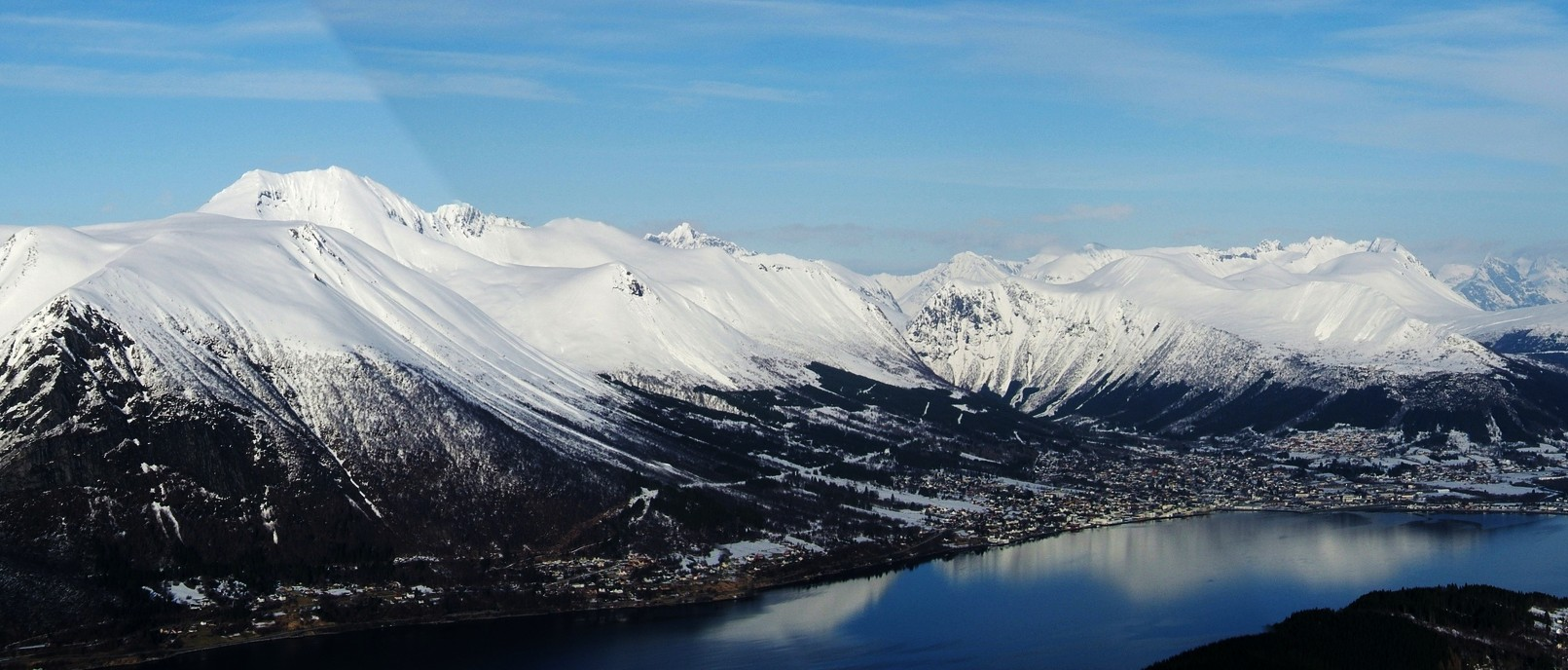
- Saudehornet (left) seen from Helgehornet. Village of Ørsta to the right and the Ørstafjorden below.

Highest point
- Elevation: 1,304 m (4,278 ft)
- Prominence: 825 m (2,707 ft)
- Parent peak: Kolåstinden
- Isolation: 9.1 km (5.7 mi)
- Coordinates: 62.2356°N 6.1425°E

Geography
- Interactive map of the mountain
- Location: Møre og Romsdal, Norway
- Parent range: Sunnmørsalpene
- Topo map: 1119 II Volda

Saudehornet is a mountain that is located 3 kilometres (1.9 mi) north of the village of Ørsta in Ørsta Municipality, Møre og Romsdal, Norway.

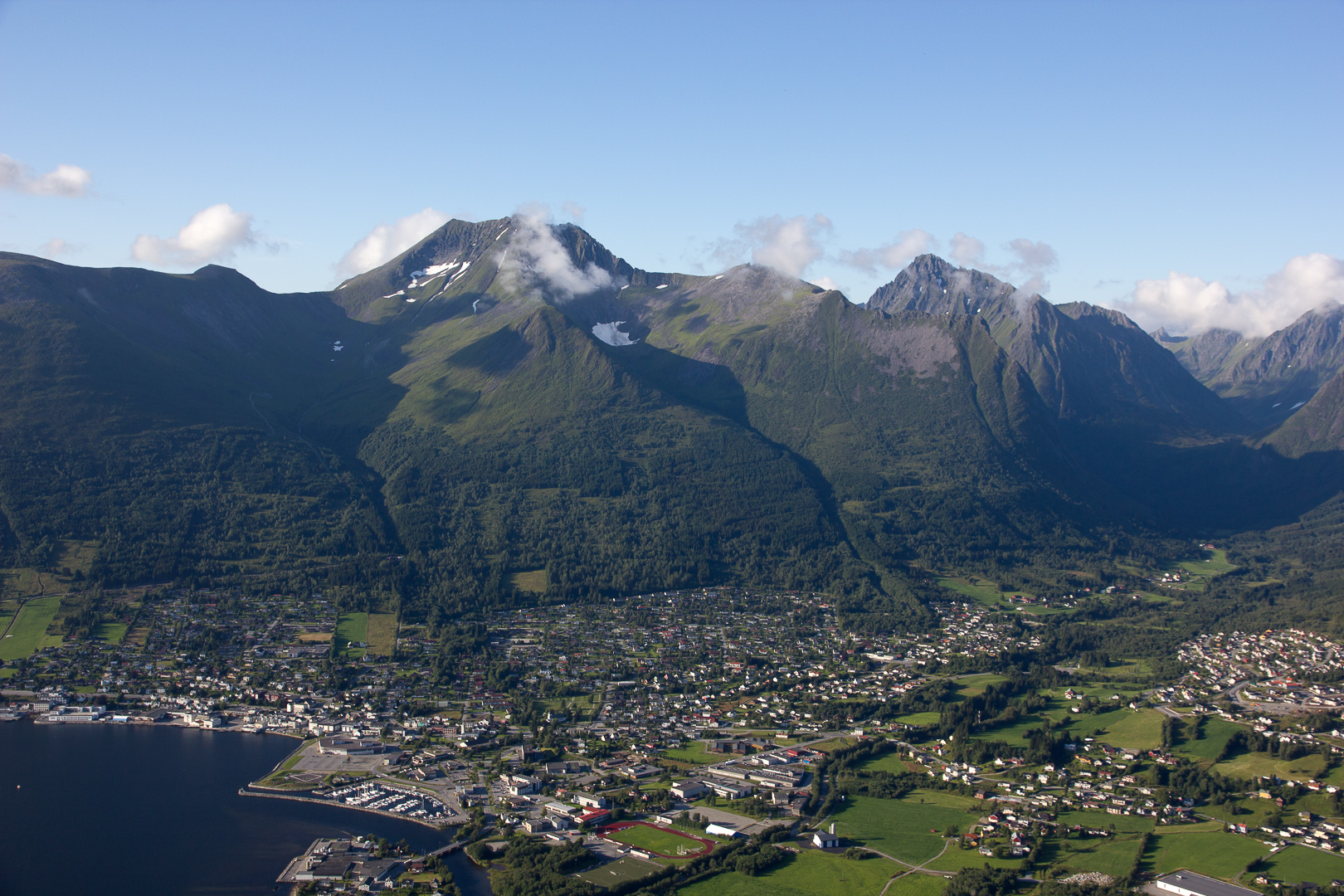
Saudehornet, towering above the village of Ørsta

The 1,303-metre (4,275 ft) is a very popular, though steep, destination for skiing in the Sunnmørsalpene range. It is located just north of the European route E39 highway, about 5 kilometres (3.1 mi) north of the Ørsta–Volda Airport, and about 7 kilometres (4.3 mi) south of the village of Vartdal.

== See also ==
- List of mountains of Norway
