= Jakta =

Mountain in Sunnmøre, Norway

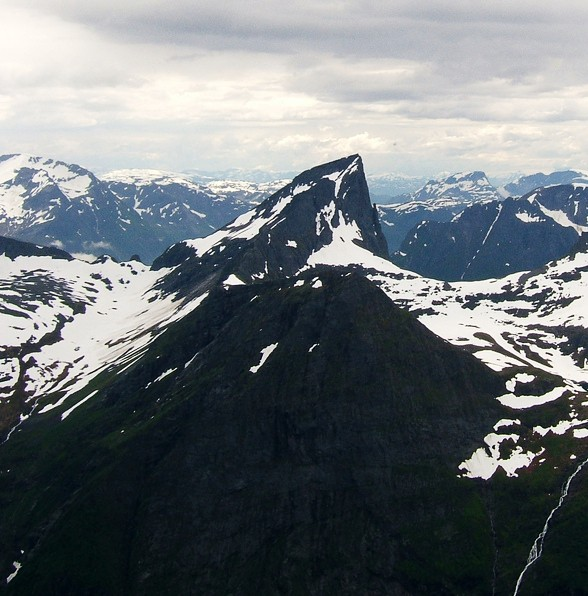
- Jakta seen from Slogen

Highest point
- Elevation: 1,588 m (5,210 ft)
- Prominence: 529 m (1,736 ft)
- Parent peak: Kvitegga
- Isolation: 6.8 km (4.2 mi)
- Coordinates: 62.1710°N 6.6167°E

Geography
- Interactive map of the mountain
- Location: Møre og Romsdal, Norway
- Parent range: Sunnmørsalpene
- Topo map: 1219 III Hjørundfjord

Climbing
- First ascent: 1896: H.C. Bowen and C.W. Patchell

Jakta is a 1,588-metre (5,210 ft) tall mountain in the Sunnmørsalpene mountain range. It is located in Ørsta Municipality in Møre og Romsdal county, Norway. Jakta lies 5 kilometres (3.1 mi) south of the nearby mountain Slogen and just across the Hjørundfjorden from the mountain Skårasalen. The village of Leira lies 5 kilometres (3.1 mi) south of Jakta.

On 2 August 1896, the two Brits H.C. Bowen and Cecil W. Patchell became the first known people to reach the top of Jakta.

== See also ==
- List of mountains of Norway
