= Hjørundfjord Municipality =

Former municipality in Møre og Romsdal, Norway

Hjørundfjord Municipality Hjørundfjord herad
- Former municipality
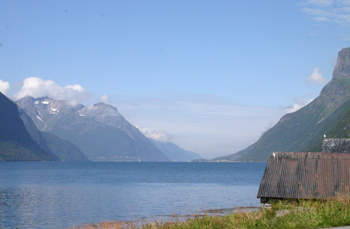
- View of the Hjørundfjorden from the south (in from the section called Storfjorden by Viddal)

- Møre og Romsdal within Norway

- Hjørundfjord within Møre og Romsdal
- Coordinates: 62°12′33″N 06°28′11″E
- Country: Norway
- County: Møre og Romsdal
- District: Sunnmøre
- Established: 1 Jan 1838
  - Created as: Formannskapsdistrikt
- Disestablished: 1 Jan 1964
  - Succeeded by: Ørsta Municipality
- Administrative centre: Sæbø

Government
  - Mayor (1960–1963): Jakob E. Øye

Area (upon dissolution)
  - Total: 479.1 km^{2} (185.0 sq mi)
  - Rank: #204 in Norway
- Highest elevation: 1,630 m (5,350 ft)

Population (1963)
  - Total: 1,776
  - Rank: #480 in Norway
  - Density: 3.7/km^{2} (9.6/sq mi)
  - Change (10 years): ▼ −3.2%
- Demonym: Hjørundfjording

Official language
  - Norwegian form: Nynorsk
- Time zone: UTC+01:00 (CET)
  - Summer (DST): UTC+02:00 (CEST)
- ISO 3166 code: NO-1522

Hjørundfjord is a former municipality in Møre og Romsdal county, Norway. The 479-square-kilometre (185 sq mi) municipality existed from 1838 until its dissolution in 1964. The area is now part of Ørsta Municipality (north) and Volda Municipality (south) in the traditional district of Sunnmøre. The administrative centre was the village of Sæbø, located on the shores of the Hjørundfjorden. The villages of Bjørke, Leira, and Store Standal were all a part Hjørundfjord Municipality.

Prior to its dissolution in 1964, the 479-square-kilometre (185 sq mi) municipality was the 204th largest by area out of the 689 municipalities in Norway. Hjørundfjord Municipality was the 480th most populous municipality in Norway with a population of about 1,776. The municipality's population density was 3.7 inhabitants per square kilometre (9.6/sq mi) and its population had decreased by 3.2% over the previous 10-year period.

== General information ==
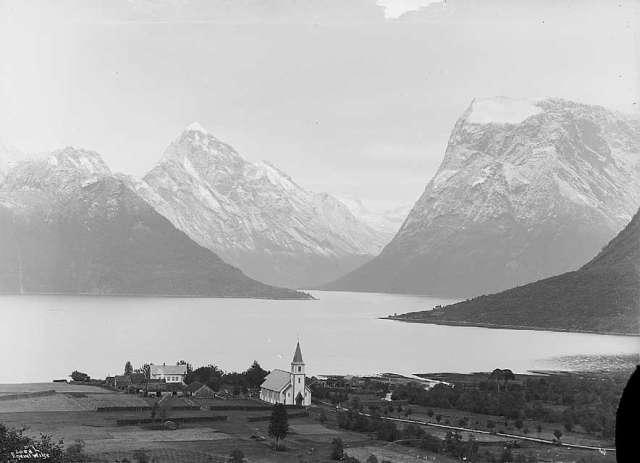
View of the Hjørundfjord Church (c. 1885)

The municipality was established on 1 January 1838 (see formannskapsdistrikt law). The original municipality was the same as the prestegjeld (parish) of Hjørundfjord.

During the 1960s, there were many municipal mergers across Norway due to the work of the Schei Committee. On 1 January 1964, Hjørundfjord Municipality (population: 1,728), Vartdal Municipality (population: 1,315), and Ørsta Municipality (population: 6,209) were merged to form a new, larger Ørsta Municipality.

On 1 January 2020, another large municipal border adjustment took place. The inner southern areas of Hjørundfjord, Bjørke and Leira, were transferred from Ørsta to Volda, along with neighboring Hornindal Municipality (previously in Sogn og Fjordane county).

=== Name ===
The municipality (originally the parish) is named after the local Hjørundfjorden (Old Norse: Hjǫrundarfjǫrdr). The first element is the old name of the fjord, Old Norse: Hjǫrund. This origin of this name is uncertain, but it may have come from the word hjǫrr which means "sword". The last element is fjǫrdr which means "fjord".

=== Churches ===
The Church of Norway had one parish (sokn) within Hjørundfjord Municipality. At the time of the municipal dissolution, it was part of the Hjørundfjord prestegjeld and the Søre Sunnmøre prosti (deanery) in the Diocese of Bjørgvin.

Churches in Hjørundfjord Municipality
Parish (sokn)	Church name	Location of the church	Year built
Hjørundfjord	Hjørundfjord Church	Sæbø	1880

== Geography ==
The municipality encircled both sides of the Hjørundfjorden as well as the Bondalen valley. The highest point in the municipality was the 1,630-metre (5,350 ft) tall mountain Smørskredtindane, whose peak was located about 300 metres (980 ft) from the border with Stranda Municipality. Vartdal Municipality was located to the northwest, Ørsta Municipality was located to the west, Volda Municipality was located to the southwest, Hornindal Municipality was located to the south (in Sogn og Fjordane county), Sunnylven Municipality was located to the southeast, Stranda Municipality was located to the east, and Sykkylven Municipality was located to the northeast.

== Government ==
While it existed, Hjørundfjord Municipality was responsible for primary education (through 10th grade), outpatient health services, senior citizen services, welfare and other social services, zoning, economic development, and municipal roads and utilities. The municipality was governed by a municipal council of directly elected representatives. The mayor was indirectly elected by a vote of the municipal council. The municipality was under the jurisdiction of the Frostating Court of Appeal.

=== Municipal council ===
The municipal council (Heradsstyre) of Hjørundfjord Municipality was made up of 17 representatives that were elected to four year terms. The tables below show the historical composition of the council by political party.

Hjørundfjord heradsstyre 1959–1963
Party name (in Nynorsk)	Number of representatives
Labour Party (Arbeidarpartiet)	2
Local List(s) (Lokale lister)	15
Total number of members:	17
Note: On 1 January 1964, Hjørundfjord Municipality became part of Ørsta Municipality.

Hjørundfjord heradsstyre 1955–1959
Party name (in Nynorsk)	Number of representatives
Labour Party (Arbeidarpartiet)	2
Local List(s) (Lokale lister)	15
Total number of members:	17

Hjørundfjord heradsstyre 1951–1955
Party name (in Nynorsk)	Number of representatives
Labour Party (Arbeidarpartiet)	2
Local List(s) (Lokale lister)	14
Total number of members:	16

Hjørundfjord heradsstyre 1947–1951
Party name (in Nynorsk)	Number of representatives
Local List(s) (Lokale lister)	16
Total number of members:	16

Hjørundfjord heradsstyre 1945–1947
Party name (in Nynorsk)	Number of representatives
List of workers, fishermen, and small farmholders (Arbeidarar, fiskarar, småbrukarar liste)	2
Local List(s) (Lokale lister)	14
Total number of members:	16

Hjørundfjord heradsstyre 1937–1941*
Party name (in Nynorsk)	Number of representatives
Labour Party (Arbeidarpartiet)	2
Local List(s) (Lokale lister)	14
Total number of members:	16
Note: Due to the German occupation of Norway during World War II, no elections were held for new municipal councils until after the war ended in 1945.

=== Mayors ===
The mayor (Nynorsk: ordførar) of Hjørundfjord Municipality was the political leader of the municipality and the chairperson of the municipal council. The following people have held this position:

- 1838–1851: Hans Olsen Stokke
- 1852–1853: Ole Olsen Saure
- 1854–1857: Ole Torstensen Standal
- 1858–1859: Edvard Storm Munch
- 1870–1898: Paul Andreas Jetmundsen Aklestad (V)
- 1899–1899: Arne Eliasson Grønningsæter
- 1900–1907: Ole Christian Larsson Tvergrov
- 1908–1916: John Olson Standal
- 1917–1919: Jetmund Jakobson Skjaastad
- 1920–1922: Ole Karlsen Tryggeseth
- 1923–1931: Bernt Ingebriktson Håndlykken
- 1932–1934: Knut Jonson Standal
- 1935–1941: Elias Christian Fanneløb
- 1941–1942: Trygve Nilsen (NS)
- 1942–1945: Ola O. Skylstad (NS)
- 1945–1945: Karl A. Tryggeseth
- 1946–1959: Johannes Bjøringsøy
- 1960–1963: Jakob E. Øye

== Notable people ==
- Knut Skram (born 1937), a baritone
- Rasmus Skylstad (1893–1972), a diplomat

== See also ==
- List of municipalities of Norway
