= Bondalen =

Valley in Sunnmøre, Norway

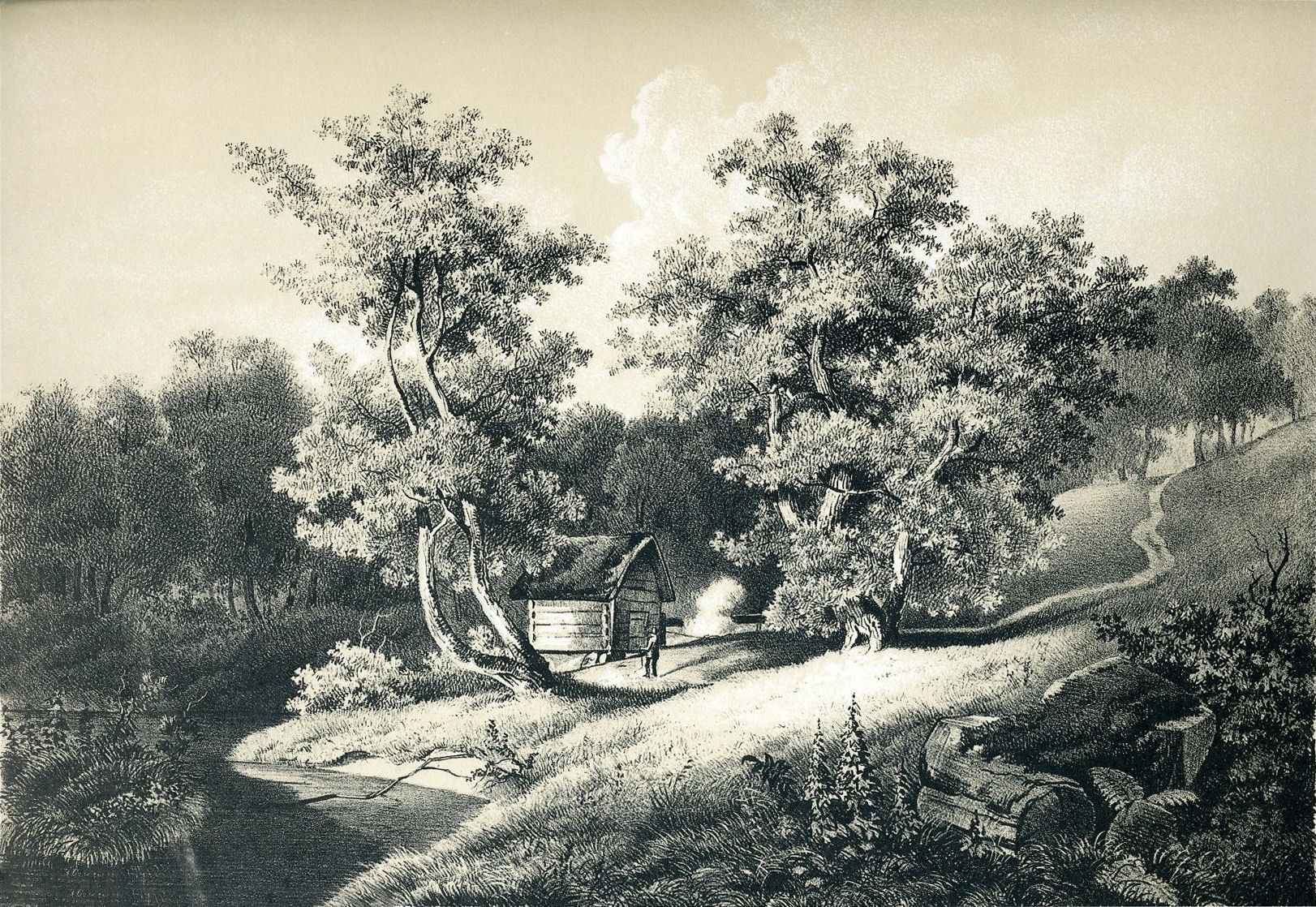
- Pictures from the Work "Norge fremstillet i billeder" 1848 by Chr. Tønsberg. Bondalen, Ørsta municipality, Møre og Romsdal county, Norway.
- Floor elevation: 440 m (1,440 ft)
- Length: 11 kilometres (6.8 mi)
- Width: 1.5 kilometres (0.93 mi)

Geography
- Population centers: Sæbø
- Coordinates: 62°11′09″N 06°26′01″E

Location
- Interactive map of the valley

Bondalen is a valley in Ørsta Municipality in Møre og Romsdal, Norway. The 11-kilometre (6.8 mi) long, sparsely populated valley runs west from the village of Sæbø, on the shore of the Hjørundfjorden.

A section of Norwegian County Road 655 (Fv655) runs through the valley, serving Sæbø and accessing the ferry that links traffic to and from the eastern leg of Fv655, across Hjørundfjorden.

Bondalen is located in the midst of the Sunnmørsalpene mountains, with the mountain Skårasalen just to the south. The Hjørundfjord Church, a primary and secondary school, and a number of other community services for the area are all located in the valley.

== See also ==
- Jon Hustad
