= Ytre-Standal =

Village in Ørsta Municipality, Norway

- Village
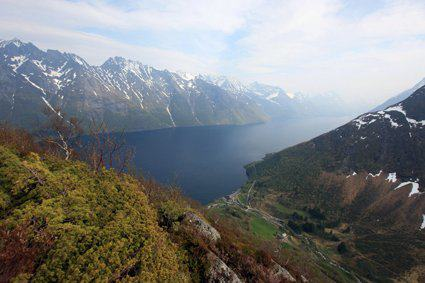
- View of Ytre Standal
- Interactive map of Ytre-Standal
- Location within Møre og Romsdal Location within Norway
- Coordinates: 62.2985°N 6.4098°E
- Country: Norway
- Region: Western Norway
- County: Møre og Romsdal
- District: Sunnmøre
- Municipality: Ørsta
- Elevation: 9 m (30 ft)
- Time zone: UTC+01:00 (CET)
  - Summer (DST): UTC+02:00 (CEST)
- Post Code: 6174 Barstadvik

Ytre-Standal is a small village in the Hjørundfjorden area of Ørsta Municipality in Møre og Romsdal, Norway. The village has a population of approximately 3 people and in the weekends above 20. Ytre-Standal is located along the Hjørundfjorden in between the villages of Store-Standal and Festøya. The village is located among the Sunnmørsalpene mountains.

As with many villages rural areas, populations have been gradually decreasing as living off the land is no longer viable in modernized countries.

At Ytre-Standal, Marine Harvest has one of their hatcheries (cold water) employing approximately 7 people.
