= Kolåstinden =

Mountain in Sunnmøre, Norway

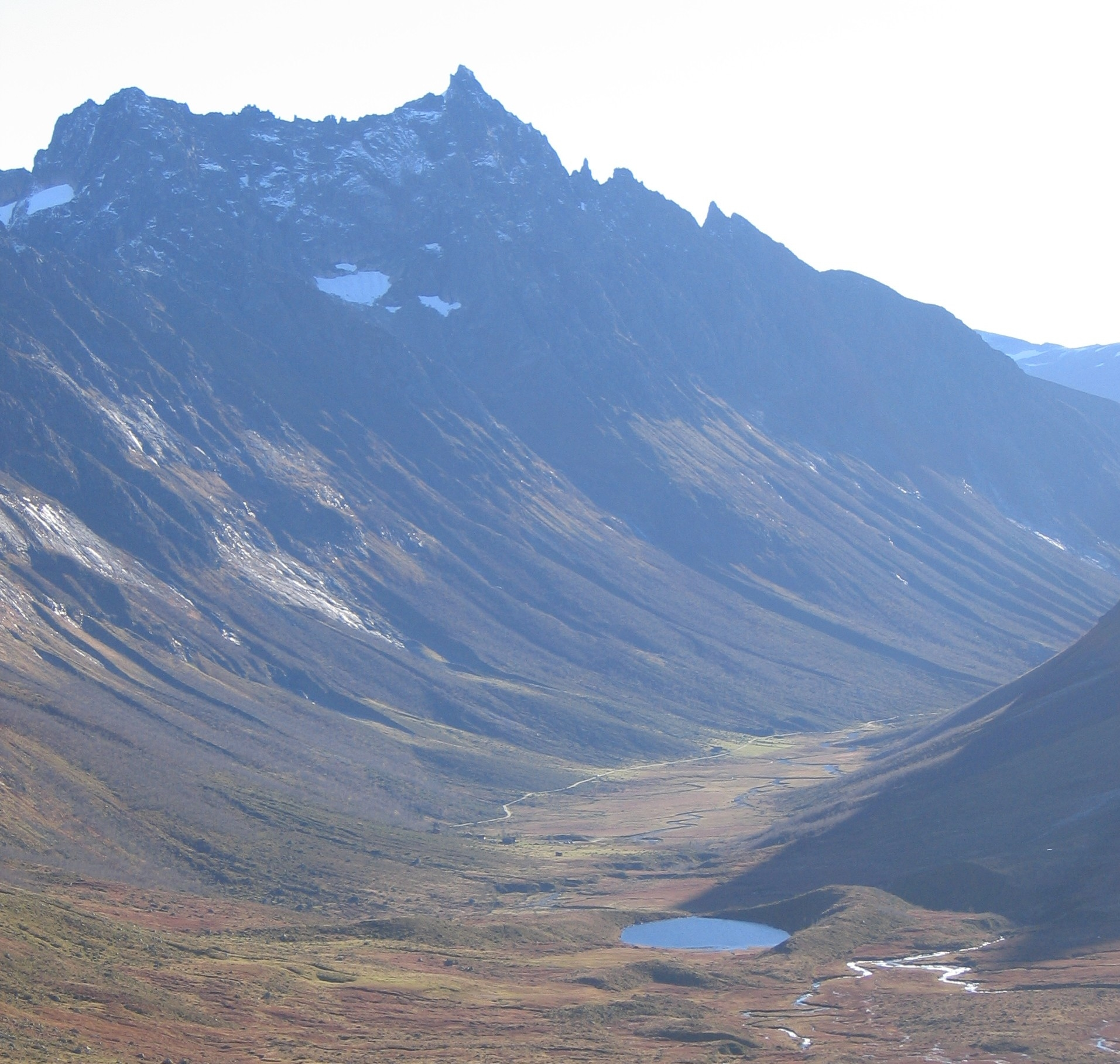
- Kolåstinden and Romedalen

Highest point
- Elevation: 1,432 m (4,698 ft)
- Prominence: 1,163 m (3,816 ft)
- Parent peak: Skårasalen
- Isolation: 12.6 km (7.8 mi)
- Coordinates: 62.2587°N 6.3106°E

Geography
- Interactive map of the mountain
- Location: Møre og Romsdal, Norway
- Parent range: Sunnmørsalpene
- Topo map: 1219 IV Sykkylven

Kolåstinden is a mountain in Ørsta Municipality in Møre og Romsdal county, Norway. The 1,432-metre (4,698 ft) tall mountain is located where the Romedalen and Standaldalen valleys converge, about 5.5 kilometres (3.4 mi) west of the village of Store-Standal and the Hjørundfjorden and it is about 12 kilometres (7.5 mi) northeast of the village of Ørsta.

The summit is most easily reached from the area around the Standalhytta chalet, operated by the Aalesunds Skiklub, southwest of Store-Standal. It is easiest to reach the peak in the winter and spring on skis, while it is recommended that those accessing in the summer bring ropes for glacier crossings.

== See also ==
- List of mountains of Norway
