= Trandal =

Village in Ørsta Municipality, Norway

- Village
- Interactive map of Trandal
- Location within Møre og Romsdal Location within Norway
- Coordinates: 62.26144°N 6.50346°E
- Country: Norway
- Region: Western Norway
- County: Møre og Romsdal
- District: Sunnmøre
- Municipality: Ørsta Municipality
- Elevation: 65 m (213 ft)
- Time zone: UTC+01:00 (CET)
  - Summer (DST): UTC+02:00 (CEST)
- Post Code: 6183 Trandal

Trandal is a small village in the Hjørundfjorden area of Ørsta Municipality in Møre og Romsdal county, Norway. The village has a population of approximately 17 people. Trandal is located along the Hjørundfjorden, midway between the villages of Leknes and Hundeidvik. The village is located among the Sunnmørsalpene mountains.

The village has no road connections to the rest of Norway. There is a ferry service from this village to Store-Standal, Leknes, and Sæbø.

Trandal has several local businesses:

- Trandal Fjordhytter that rents out cabins
- Christian Gaard Bygdetun AS a popular pub and restaurant which houses three festivals during the summer; Trandalrock, Trandalblues and Trandal Country
- Trandal Bunkers AS which sells fuel for smaller commercial and recreational vessels.
- In addition, two local residents are involved with Njord Adventures AS, a whale watching company based in Tromsø.
