= Jon Hustad =

Norwegian journalist (1968–2023)

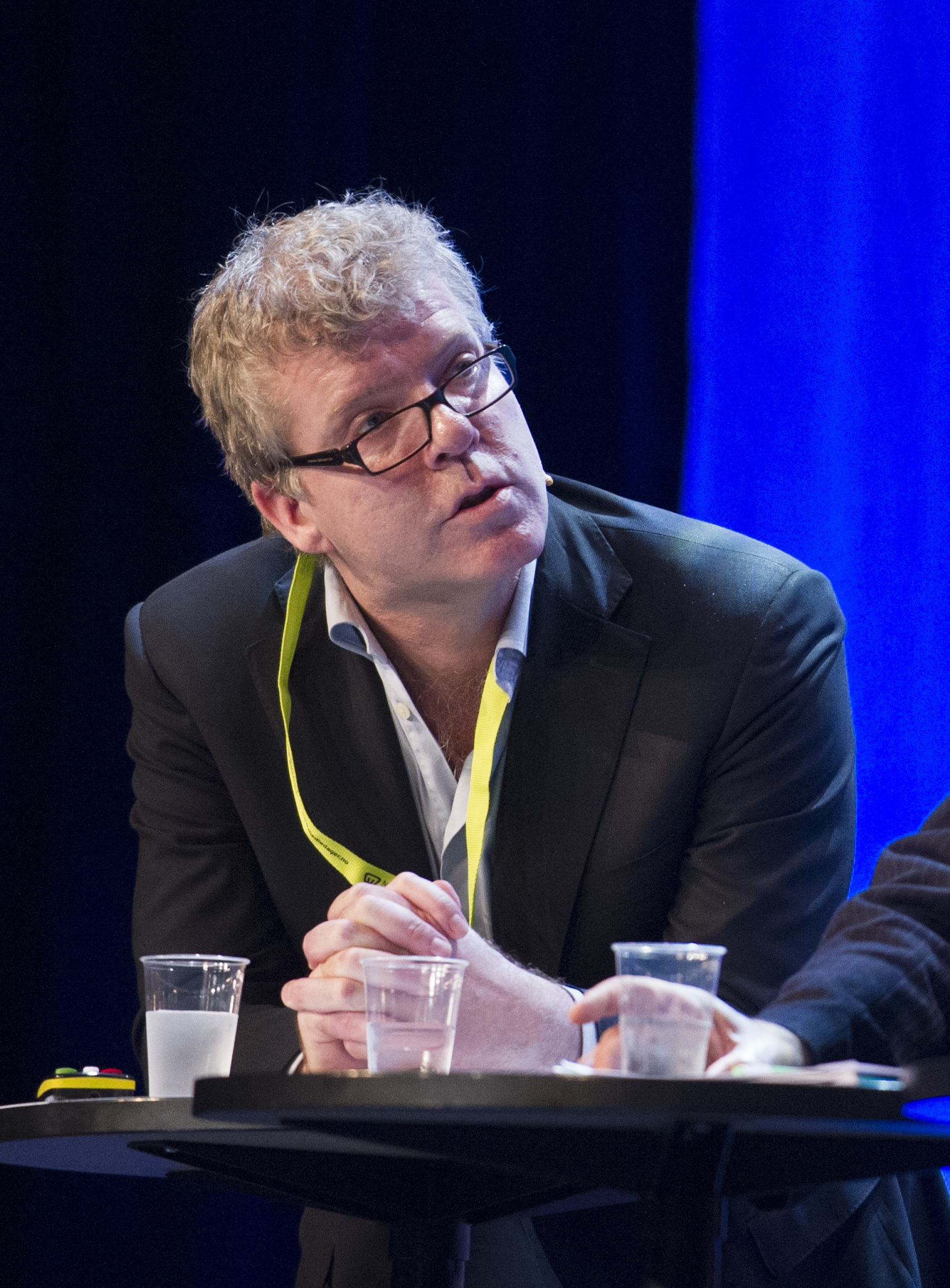
- Hustad in 2016
- Born: Jon Ottar Hustad; 25 March 1968; Ørsta Municipality, Møre og Romsdal, Norway
- Died: 12 October 2023 (aged 55)
- Occupation: Journalist

Jon Ottar Hustad (25 March 1968 – 12 October 2023) was a Norwegian journalist, writer, and lector in history.

Hustad was born in Bondalen in Ørsta Municipality. He worked in Dag og Tid until his time of death. He worked for Klassekampen from 2002 to 2003 and 2004 to 2007, and Morgenbladet from 2003 to 2004. His non-fiction books include Skolen som forsvann (2002), Hjørundfjorden (2005), and Varsleren (2006). He had a cand.philol. degree from 1997.

Hustad died on 12 October 2023 at the age of 55.

== Bibliography ==
Hustad wrote several non-fiction books:

- Skolen som forsvann (2002)
- 14 menn og ei kvinne (2004)
- Hjørundfjorden (2005)
- Varsleren (2006)
- Gjeldsslaven Europa (2012)
