= Olav Klokk =

Olav Klokk (3 September 1885 – 18 March 1964) was a Norwegian agriculturalist.

He was born in Hjørundfjord Municipality as a son of agricultural school headmaster Bernt Klokk (1857–1901) and Martine Kristiane Olava Strenge. In 1914 he married Jenny Langballe.

He took his education at Stend Agricultural School in 1905 and the Norwegian College of Agriculture in Aas Municipality in 1907. He spent most of his career as secretary of the Norwegian College of Agriculture, being hired in 1919. At the same time he also became secretary for the Nordic Association of Agricultural Scientists, Norwegian branch, and subeditor of their periodical Nordisk Jordbruksforskning. He also edited the yearbook Norske Landbrukskandidaters årbok from 1915 to 1918 and wrote several books, including Oversigt over det norske landbruks utvikling siden 1750 (1920) and the 75-year anniversary book Norges landbrukshøiskole 1859–1934. He was also an editorial committee member of the biographical dictionary Norsk biografisk leksikon.

Klokk was also engaged in agrarian politics, as a control committee member in the agrarian bank Bøndernes Bank and chair of the financial committee in the Norwegian Agrarian Association. He died in March 1964.
