= Njål Hole =

Norwegian chemical engineer and nuclear physicist

- Born: 15 November 1914; Hjørundfjord, Norway
- Died: 6 February 1988 (aged 73); Trondheim, Norway
- Occupations: chemical engineer and nuclear physicist
- Awards: Order of the British Empire

Njål Hole MBE (15 November 1914 – 6 February 1988) was a Norwegian chemical engineer and nuclear physicist. His research was primarily in the field of nuclear physics.

== Biography ==
He was born in Hjørundfjord Municipality. He graduated from the Norwegian Institute of Technology in 1938. From 1938 he was an assistant at Norwegian Institute of Technology.

During the German occupation of Norway, he participated in resistance activities, and had to flee to Sweden. In Stockholm he was appointed at the same laboratory as exiled Austrian nuclear physicist Lise Meitner, who had been part of the team that discovered nuclear fission. Hole had contacts with the British Secret Intelligence Service, reporting to Norwegian intelligence officer Leif Tronstad (1903–1945) in London. He was decorated Member of the Order of the British Empire after the war.

He was appointed professor in physics at the Norwegian Institute of Technology in Trondheim from 1947 and took his doctorate in 1950. In 1954 he became professor of experimental physics. In 1964, he took over a new professorship in general physics, which he managed until his retirement in 1981.

== Related reading ==
- Dahl, Per F. (1999). Heavy Water and the Wartime Race for Nuclear Energy. London: Taylor & Francis. ISBN 9780750306331.
