= Leira, Møre og Romsdal =

Village in Volda Municipality, Norway

Leira
- Village
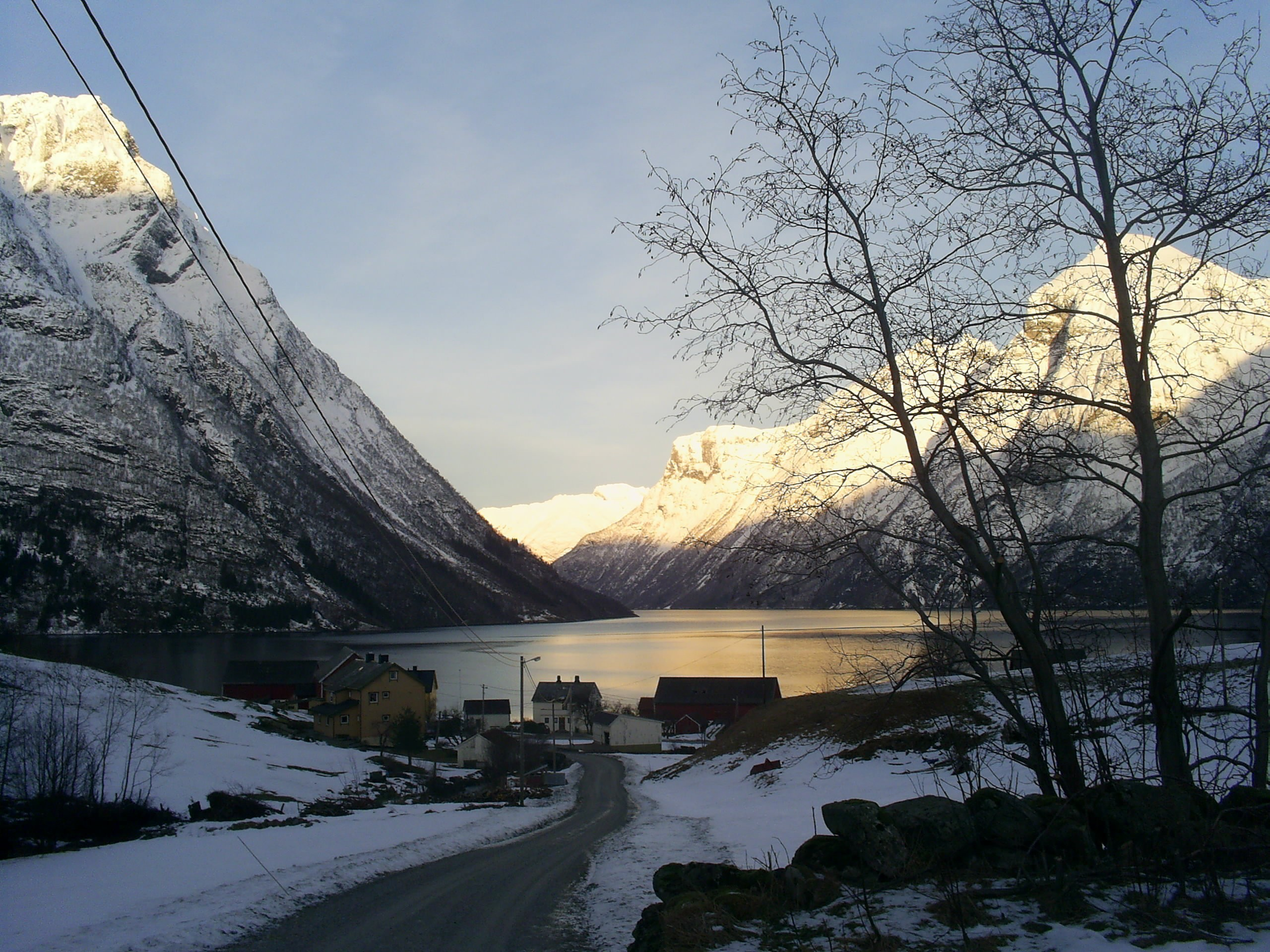
- View of Leira
- Interactive map of Leira
- Location within Møre og Romsdal Location within Norway
- Coordinates: 62.1224°N 6.5868°E
- Country: Norway
- Region: Western Norway
- County: Møre og Romsdal
- District: Sunnmøre
- Municipality: Volda
- Elevation: 5 m (16 ft)
- Time zone: UTC+01:00 (CET)
  - Summer (DST): UTC+02:00 (CEST)
- Post Code: 6190 Bjørke

Leira is a small village in Volda Municipality in Møre og Romsdal county, Norway. It lies between the villages of Bjørke and Viddal, at the end of Hjørundfjorden. The village is located in the Sunnmørsalpene mountains, about 6 kilometres (3.7 mi) from the mountains Skårasalen (to the northwest), Jakta (to the northeast), Kvitegga (to the southeast), and Hornindalsrokken (to the south).

There are about 15–20 residents in Leira, with most residents farming their land. Leira is fairly isolated, with only one road leading to it. The road goes from Bjørke, through a 2-kilometre (1.2 mi) long tunnel through the mountain, Kamben, before reaching Leira. The road continues along the fjord to Viddal where the road ends. The closest urban area is the village of Volda, about 38 kilometres (24 mi) to the northwest of Leira.

Prior to 2020, the village and surrounding area was part of the neighbouring Ørsta Municipality.

== Name ==
The name is derived from the Norwegian language word leire which means 'clay'.
