= Kari Sørbø =

Norwegian radio personality (born 1955)

Kari Sørbø (born 26 July 1955) is a Norwegian radio personality.

She was born in Bergen, but grew up in Ørsta. She finished her secondary education in 1975 and graduated from the University of Bergen in 1977. She also attended Møre og Romsdal District College. She was hired in Norwegian Broadcasting Corporation in 1979, and worked for the district office in Finnmark from 1979 to 1986 and in NRK P2 from 1986 to 1993, then in NRK P1. She hosted the radio program Her og nå for twenty-two years, but changed job to become a news reporter in 2009.
