= Bjørke =

Village in Volda Municipality, Norway

- Village
- Interactive map of Bjørke
- Location within Møre og Romsdal Location within Norway
- Coordinates: 62.1015°N 6.5569°E
- Country: Norway
- Region: Western Norway
- County: Møre og Romsdal
- District: Sunnmøre
- Municipality: Volda
- Elevation: 68 m (223 ft)
- Time zone: UTC+01:00 (CET)
  - Summer (DST): UTC+02:00 (CEST)
- Post Code: 6190 Bjørke

Bjørke is a village in Volda Municipality in Møre og Romsdal, Norway. The village is located at the innermost part of the Hjørundfjorden, just south of the village of Leira. The village is home to Bjørke Church. The village of Bjørke lies in the Sunnmørsalpene mountains.

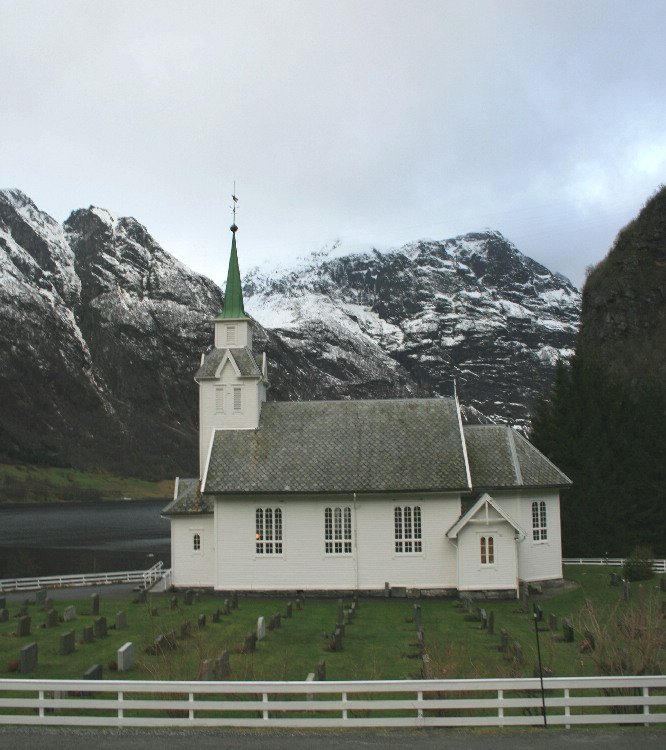
View of Bjørke Church

The Tussa hydroelectric power station is located at Bjørke. The lake up in the mountains is piped down to the power station which produces a lot of power for the area. The power station has provided a lot for the village including doctors and a swimming pool.

Bjørke is one of the oldest farm areas in the area surrounding the Hjørundfjorden. Graves found in Bjørke date back to about 600 AD.

Since 2014, Bjørke has been the location of Indiefjord, an indiepop festival, hosting such bands as The Spook School, Haiku Salut, The School and The Smittens.

Prior to 2020, the village and surrounding areas were part of Ørsta Municipality.

== Happenings ==
- (1988). Teatersensasjon på Bjørke, Newspaper Møre-Nytt (Editor-in-chief Erik Bergmann), Saturday 9th of July 1988, 54. årgang nummer 79, side 1. From nb.no (Nasjonalbiblioteket - The Norwegian National Library). Retrieved 19. februar 2026.
- (1988). Byline 'K.' Teaterliv på Bjørke: På talefot med den unge Ibsen, Newspaper Møre-Nytt (Editor-in-chief Erik Bergmann), Saturday 9th of July 1988, 54. årgang nummer 79, side 5. From nb.no (Nasjonalbiblioteket - The Norwegian National Library). Retrieved 19. februar 2026.
