= Paul Andreas Jetmundsen Aklestad =

Norwegian politician

Paul Andreas Jetmundsen Aklestad (18 December 1837 – 21 May 1924) was a Norwegian politician for the Liberal Party.

Born in Hjørundfjord Municipality, he worked as a teacher from 1854 to 1861, and then as a farmer in Hjørundfjord. He was also the director of the local savings bank, municipal treasurer and county auditor. He was a member of the municipal council of Hjørundfjord Municipality from 1866 to 1910. He served as mayor there for thirty years, although the exact years are unknown. For an unknown period he was a member of the county committee, a forerunner of the county council. He was elected to the Norwegian Parliament from the constituency Romsdals Amt in 1889, and was re-elected on six consecutive occasions. His last term ended in 1909. His foremost concern was that of public saving instead of expenditure, in the vein of Søren Jaabæk.

In June 1861, he married Berte Johanne Olsdatter Skylstad (1840–1922), who hailed from a nearby farm in Hjørundfjord. They had several children.
