= Sæbø, Møre og Romsdal =

Village in Ørsta Municipality, Norway

Sæbø
- Village
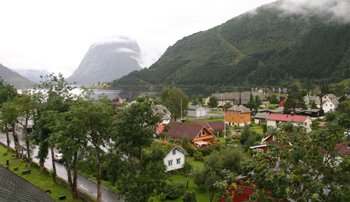
- View of Sæbø
- Interactive map of Sæbø
- Location within Møre og Romsdal Location within Norway
- Coordinates: 62.2076°N 6.4759°E
- Country: Norway
- Region: Western Norway
- County: Møre og Romsdal
- District: Sunnmøre
- Municipality: Ørsta
- Elevation: 3 m (9.8 ft)
- Time zone: UTC+01:00 (CET)
  - Summer (DST): UTC+02:00 (CEST)
- Post Code: 6165 Sæbø

Sæbø is a village in Ørsta Municipality in Møre og Romsdal, Norway. The village is located along the Hjørundfjorden, at the eastern end of the Bondalen valley, through which it connects to the village of Ørsta, the administrative centre of the municipality, via Norwegian County Road 655 (Fv655).

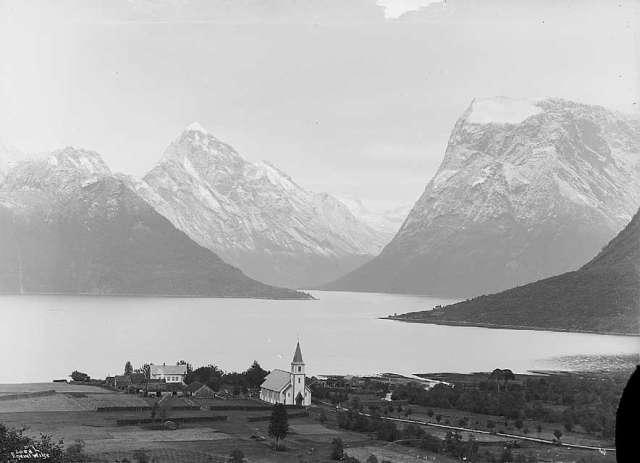
View of Sæbø from the 1880s

Sæbø is about 5 kilometres (3.1 mi) north of the mountain Skårasalen. The village of Store-Standal lies about 6 kilometres (3.7 mi) to the north and the villages of Leira and Bjørke lie about 11 kilometres (6.8 mi) to the south. The village of Urke is nearly due east, on the opposite side of Hjørundfjorden, on the north shore of the Norangsfjorden arm; the two villages are connected by ferry, which serves as a link between the eastern and western sections of Fv655.

== History ==
Sæbø was the administrative centre of the old Hjørundfjord Municipality, which was incorporated into Ørsta in 1964.
