= Urke, Møre og Romsdal =

Village in Ørsta Municipality, Norway

Urke
- Village
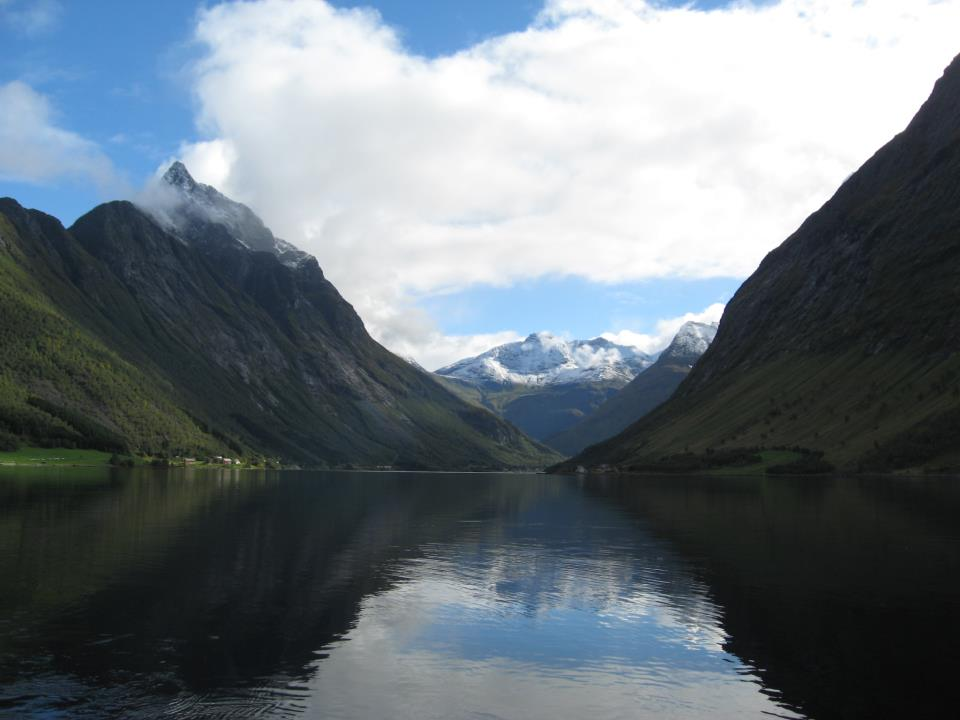
- Interactive map of Urke
- Location within Møre og Romsdal Location within Norway
- Coordinates: 62°12′46″N 06°34′00″E
- Country: Norway
- Region: Western Norway
- County: Møre og Romsdal
- District: Sunnmøre
- Municipality: Ørsta Municipality
- Elevation: 7 m (23 ft)
- Time zone: UTC+01:00 (CET)
  - Summer (DST): UTC+02:00 (CEST)
- Post Code: 6196

Urke is a village in Ørsta Municipality in Møre og Romsdal county, Norway. The village is located on the north shore of the Norangsfjorden, which is an arm on the east side of the Hjørundfjorden.

Urke is about 11 kilometres (6.8 mi) south of the mountain Slogen. The village of Sæbø is nearly due west, on the opposite side of Hjørundfjorden. A car ferry connects the two villages.

Ships serving the Hurtigruten visit Urke daily in the late summer.
