= Kvitegga =

Mountain in Møre og Romsdal, Norway

- Blåfjellet
- Interactive map of the mountain

Highest point
- Elevation: 1,717 m (5,633 ft)
- Prominence: 1,327 m (4,354 ft)
- Isolation: 23.1 km (14.4 mi)
- Listing: 10 at List of peaks in Norway by prominence
- Coordinates: 62°05′41″N 6°42′08″E

Geography
- Location: Møre og Romsdal, Norway
- Parent range: Sunnmørsalpene
- Topo map: 1219 III Hjørundfjord

Kvitegga is a mountain on the border between Stranda Municipality and Volda Municipality in Møre og Romsdal county, Norway. It is located about 7 kilometres (4.3 mi) southeast of the village of Leira (in Volda Municipality) and about 8 kilometres (5.0 mi) west of Hellesylt (in Stranda Municipality). The 1,717-metre (5,633 ft) tall Kvitegga is located about 3 kilometres (1.9 mi) northeast of the nearby mountain Hornindalsrokken.

Kvitegga is the highest mountain in the Sunnmørsalpene mountain range. It offers a very wide view, from Galdhøpiggen in the southeast (just jutting above the Sikilbreen glacier), to the impressing Hurrungane mountains further to the southeast, as well as all the local alpine surroundings and a wide swath of the ocean in the west.

== See also ==
- List of peaks in Norway by prominence (Kvitegga is number 10)
- List of mountains of Norway
