= Årset, Vartdal =

Village in Ørsta Municipality, Norway

Årset
- Hamlet
- Interactive map of Årset
- Location within Møre og Romsdal Location within Norway
- Coordinates: 62.29661°N 6.09525°E
- Country: Norway
- Region: Western Norway
- County: Møre og Romsdal
- District: Sunnmøre
- Municipality: Ørsta Municipality
- Elevation: 48 m (157 ft)
- Time zone: UTC+01:00 (CET)
  - Summer (DST): UTC+02:00 (CEST)
- Post Code: 6170 Vartdal

Årset is a small farming village in Ørsta Municipality in Møre og Romsdal in Norway. It is situated along the Storelva river in the Årsetdalen valley, about 3 kilometres (1.9 mi) inland from the village of Vartdal.

== History ==
It was first mentioned in 1520 in the tax records. In 1606, there were four farms, a number which remained largely unchanged for centuries. There is a lot of uncultivated land and pasture on the sunny side, which was used in earlier times for hayfields.

The owners of the Årset farm also had land on Årsetstøylen in Årsetdalen about 4–5 kilometres (2.5–3.1 mi) from the main village and at Årsetgjerdet on the opposite side of the Storelva river which is crossed by a bridge at Årsethølen (Årset pool).

There was a boathouse at Årsetvika by the Vartdalsfjorden until 1998.

== Population ==
Population of the small area:

- 1801: 30 persons - (5 homes)
- 1865: 23 people - (4 homes)
- 1900: 45 persons - (7 homes)
