= Ørstafjorden =

Fjord in Møre og Romsdal, Norway

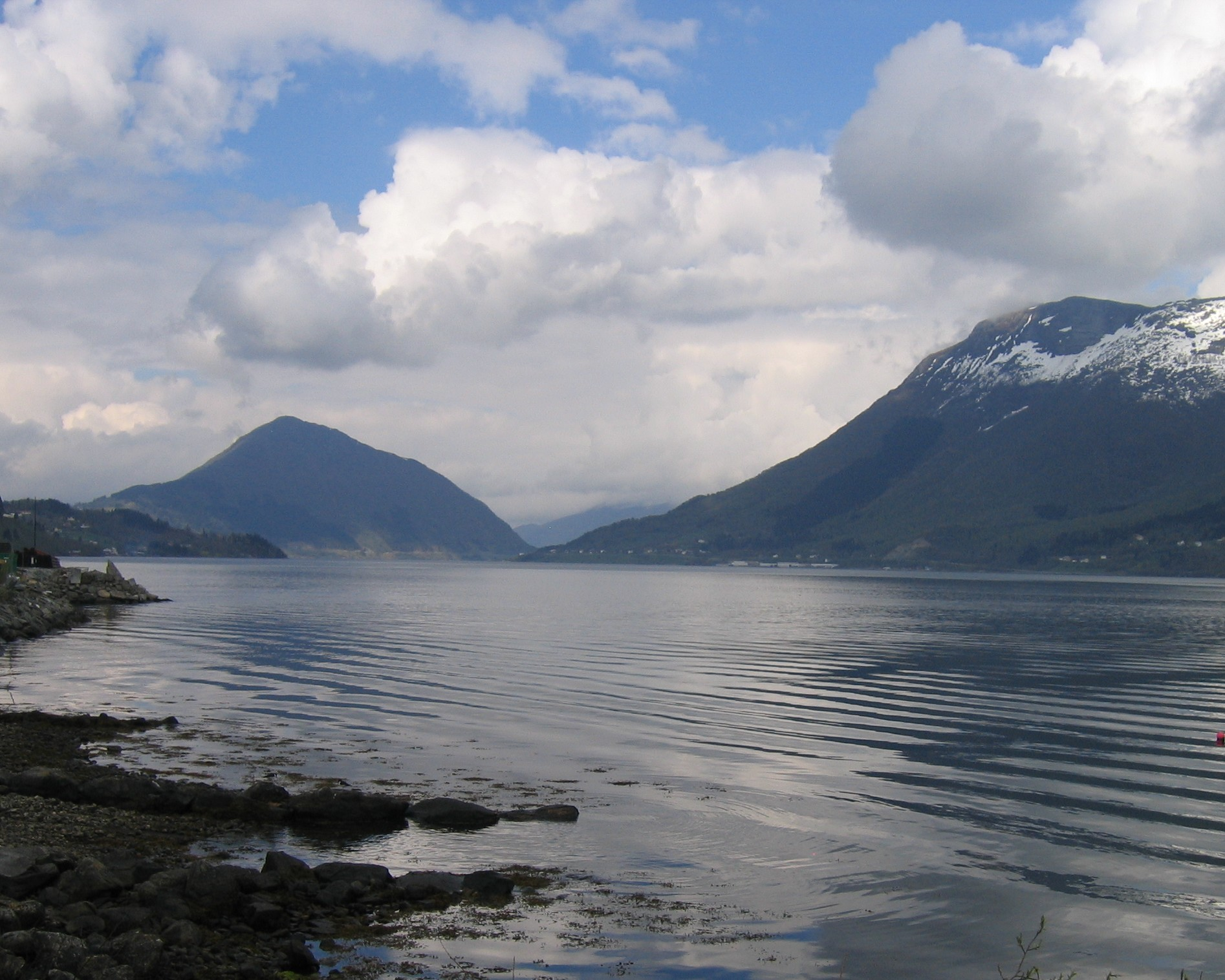
- View of the fjord
- Interactive map of the fjord
- Location: Møre og Romsdal county, Norway
- Coordinates: 62.2083°N 6.0518°E
- Type: Fjord
- Primary inflows: Storelva river
- Primary outflows: Vartdalsfjorden
- Basin countries: Norway
- Max. length: 10 kilometres (6.2 mi)
- Max. width: 2 kilometres (1.2 mi)
- Max. depth: −172 metres (−564 ft)

Ørstafjorden is a fjord in Ørsta Municipality in Møre og Romsdal, Norway. The 10-kilometre (6.2 mi) long fjord runs from the village of Ørsta to the Vartdalsfjorden. The fjord is about 2 kilometres (1.2 mi) wide and the deepest point in the fjord reaches 172 metres (564 ft) below sea level. The European route E39 highway runs along the eastern and southern shores of the fjord. The southern entrance to the Eiksund Tunnel is located along the western shore of the fjord. The inner parts of the fjord do freeze when there are extended periods of cold weather in the winters.

== See also ==
- List of Norwegian fjords
