= Ørsta Municipality =

Municipality in Møre og Romsdal, Norway

Ørsta Municipality Ørsta kommune
- Municipality
- Ørsten herred (historic name)
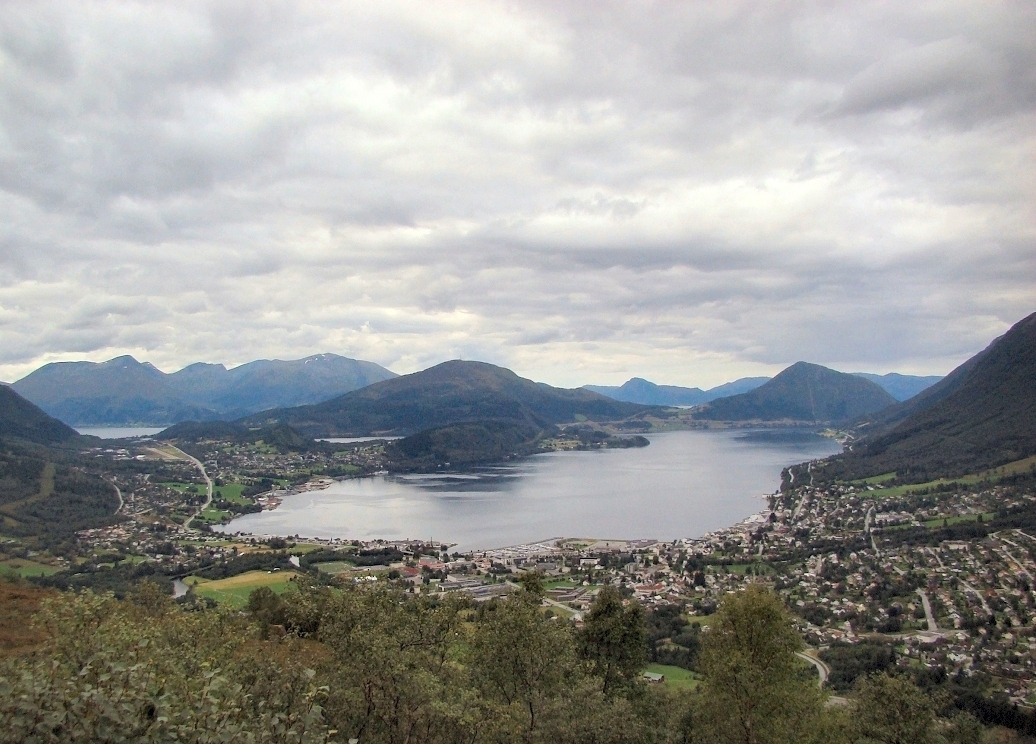
- View of the urban areas of Ørsta

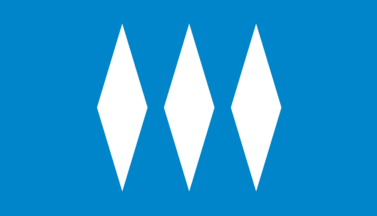
- Flag Coat of arms

- Møre og Romsdal within Norway

- Ørsta within Møre og Romsdal
- Coordinates: 62°12′01″N 06°07′56″E
- Country: Norway
- County: Møre og Romsdal
- District: Sunnmøre
- Established: 1 Aug 1883
  - Preceded by: Volda Municipality
- Administrative centre: Ørsta

Government
  - Mayor (2023): Per Are Sørheim (H)

Area
  - Total: 661.58 km^{2} (255.44 sq mi)
  - Land: 649.64 km^{2} (250.83 sq mi)
  - Water: 11.94 km^{2} (4.61 sq mi) 1.8%
  - Rank: #171 in Norway
- Highest elevation: 1,630.04 m (5,347.9 ft)

Population (2024)
  - Total: 10,958
  - Rank: #106 in Norway
  - Density: 16.6/km^{2} (43/sq mi)
  - Change (10 years): ▲ +4%
- Demonym: Ørsting

Official language
  - Norwegian form: Nynorsk
- Time zone: UTC+01:00 (CET)
  - Summer (DST): UTC+02:00 (CEST)
- ISO 3166 code: NO-1520
- Website: Official website

Ørsta (Norwegian pronunciation: [œrsta]) is a municipality in Møre og Romsdal county, Norway. It is part of the Sunnmøre region of Western Norway. The administrative centre of the municipality is the village of Ørsta. Other villages in the municipality include Barstadvik, Flåskjer, Follestaddalen, Hovdebygda, Liadal, Nordre Vartdal, Store-Standal, Sæbø, Trandal, Urke, Vartdal, Ytre-Standal, Åmdalen, and Årset.

The 662-square-kilometre (256 sq mi) municipality is the 171st largest by area out of the 357 municipalities in Norway. Ørsta Municipality is the 106th most populous municipality in Norway with a population of 10,958. The municipality's population density is 16.6 inhabitants per square kilometre (43/sq mi) and its population has increased by 4% over the previous 10-year period.

== General information ==
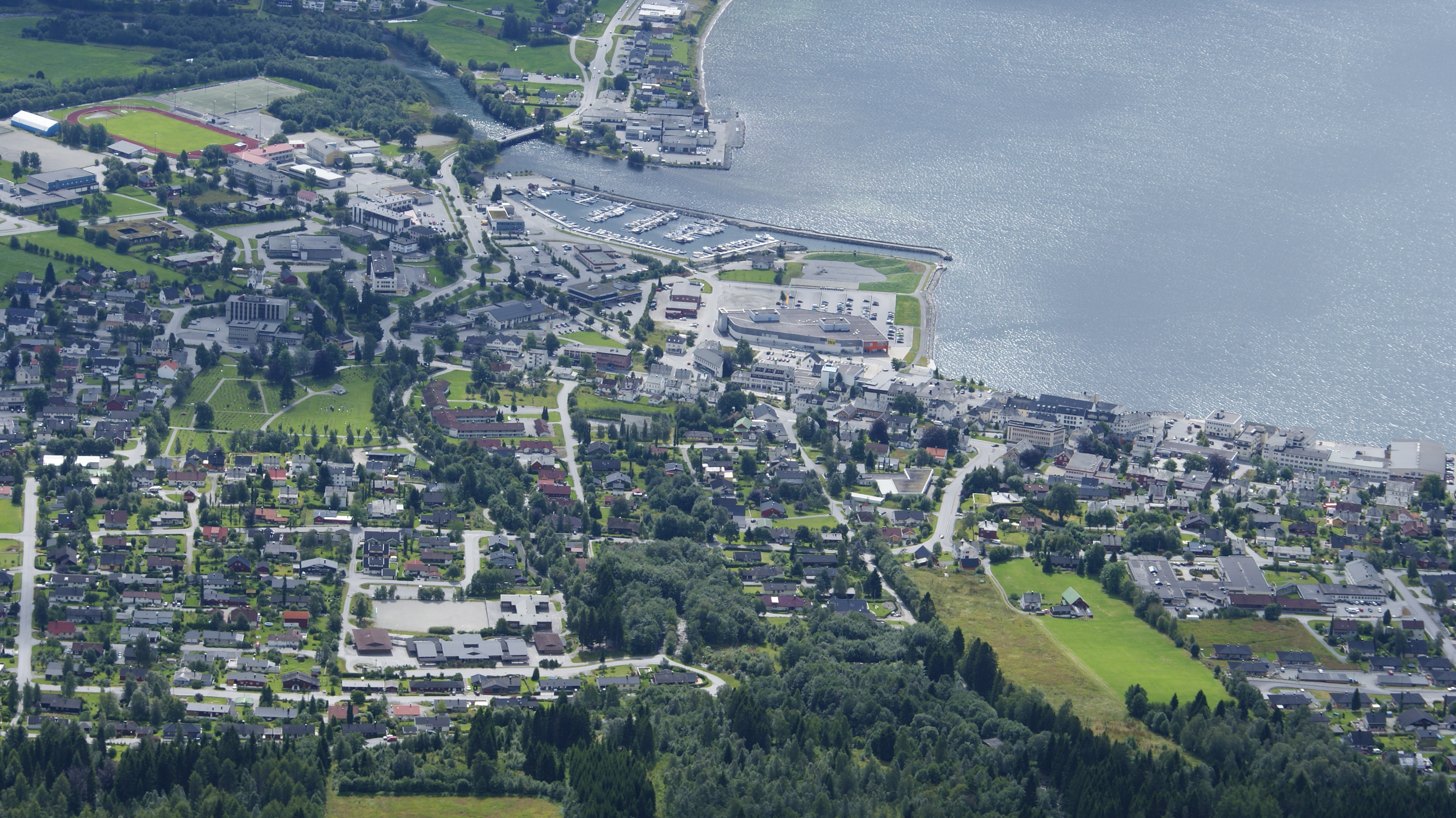
Ørsta seen from Vallahornet

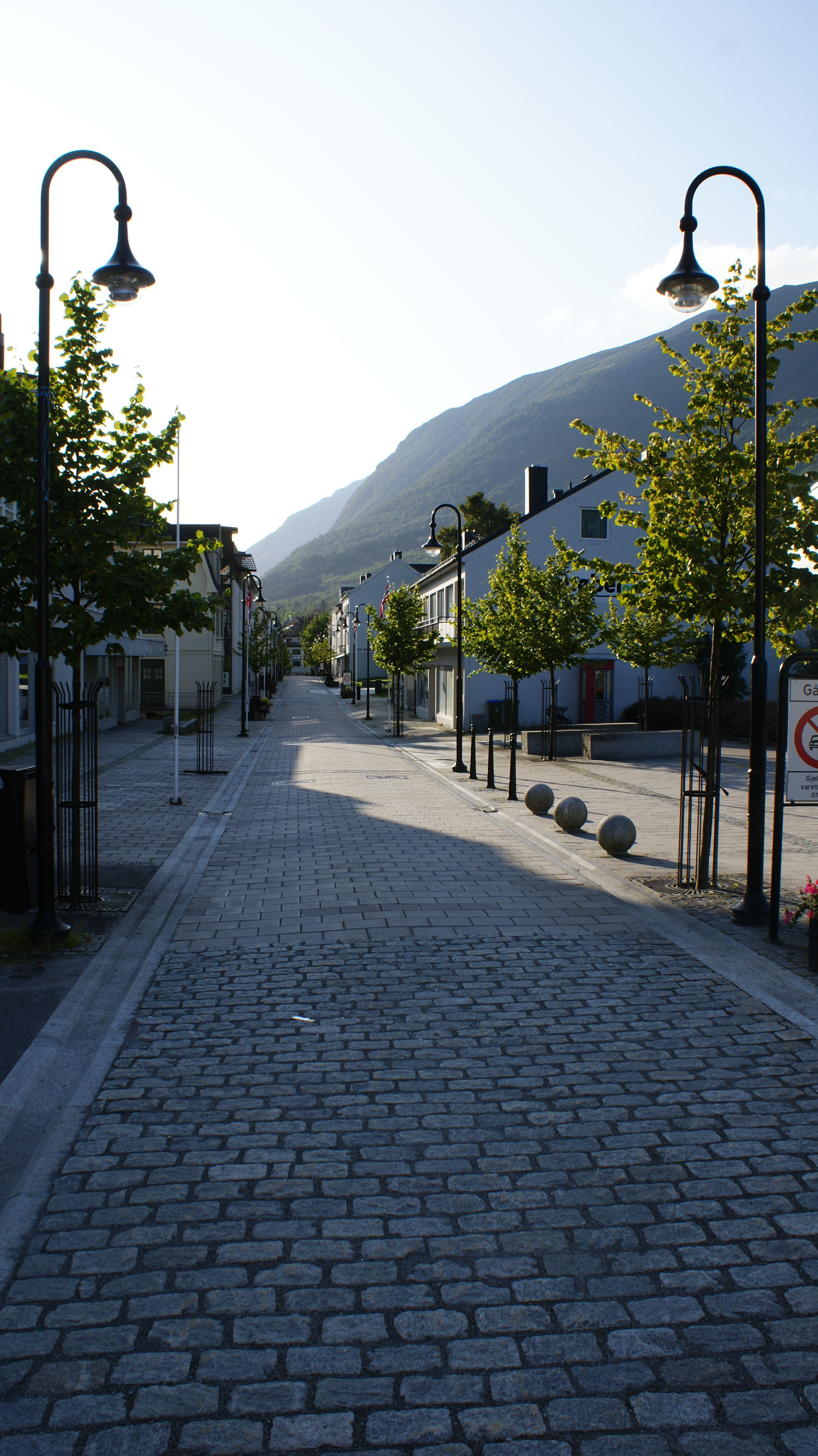
downtown Ørsta

The municipality of Ørsta was established on 1 August 1883 when it was separated from the large Volda Municipality. The initial population was 2,070. On 1 January 1893, the Ytrestølen farm (population: 13) was transferred from Ørsta Municipality to Volda Municipality. During the 1960s, there were many municipal mergers across Norway due to the work of the Schei Committee. On 1 January 1964, Ørsta Municipality (population: 6,209) was merged with Hjørundfjord Municipality (population: 1,728) and Vartdal Municipality (population: 1,315) to form a new, larger Ørsta Municipality. On 1 January 2020, the Bjørke and Leira areas of Ørsta Municipality were transferred to the neighboring Volda Municipality.

=== Name ===
The municipality (originally the parish) is named after the Ørstafjorden (Old Norse: Œrstr). The meaning of the fjord name is uncertain, but it may come from the word ǿrr which means "raging" or "mad" (possibly referring to the water in the fjord). Historically, the name of the municipality was spelled Ørsten. On 3 November 1917, a royal resolution changed the spelling of the name of the municipality to Ørsta.

=== Coat of arms ===
The coat of arms was granted on 13 July 1984. The official blazon is "Azure, three fusils in fess argent" (Norwegian: I blått tre sølv spisruter). This means the arms have a blue field (background) and the charge is a set of three fusils lined up horizontally. The charge has a tincture of argent which means it is commonly colored white, but if it is made out of metal, then silver is used. The three diamonds represent the mountains reflecting in the waters of the fjord. The arms were designed by Gudmund Nesset. The municipal flag has the same design as the coat of arms.

=== Museums ===
The Brudavoll Farm, part of the Sunnmøre Museum Foundation, is located about 5 km (3.1 mi) from the village of Ørsta.

=== Churches ===
The Church of Norway has three parishes (sokn) within Ørsta Municipality. It is part of the Søre Sunnmøre prosti (deanery) in the Diocese of Møre.

Churches in Ørsta Municipality
Parish (sokn)	Church name	Location of the church	Year built
Ørsta	Ørsta Church	Ørsta	1864
Vartdal	Vartdal Church	Nordre Vartdal	1876
Hjørundfjord	Hjørundfjord Church	Sæbø	1880

== Geography ==
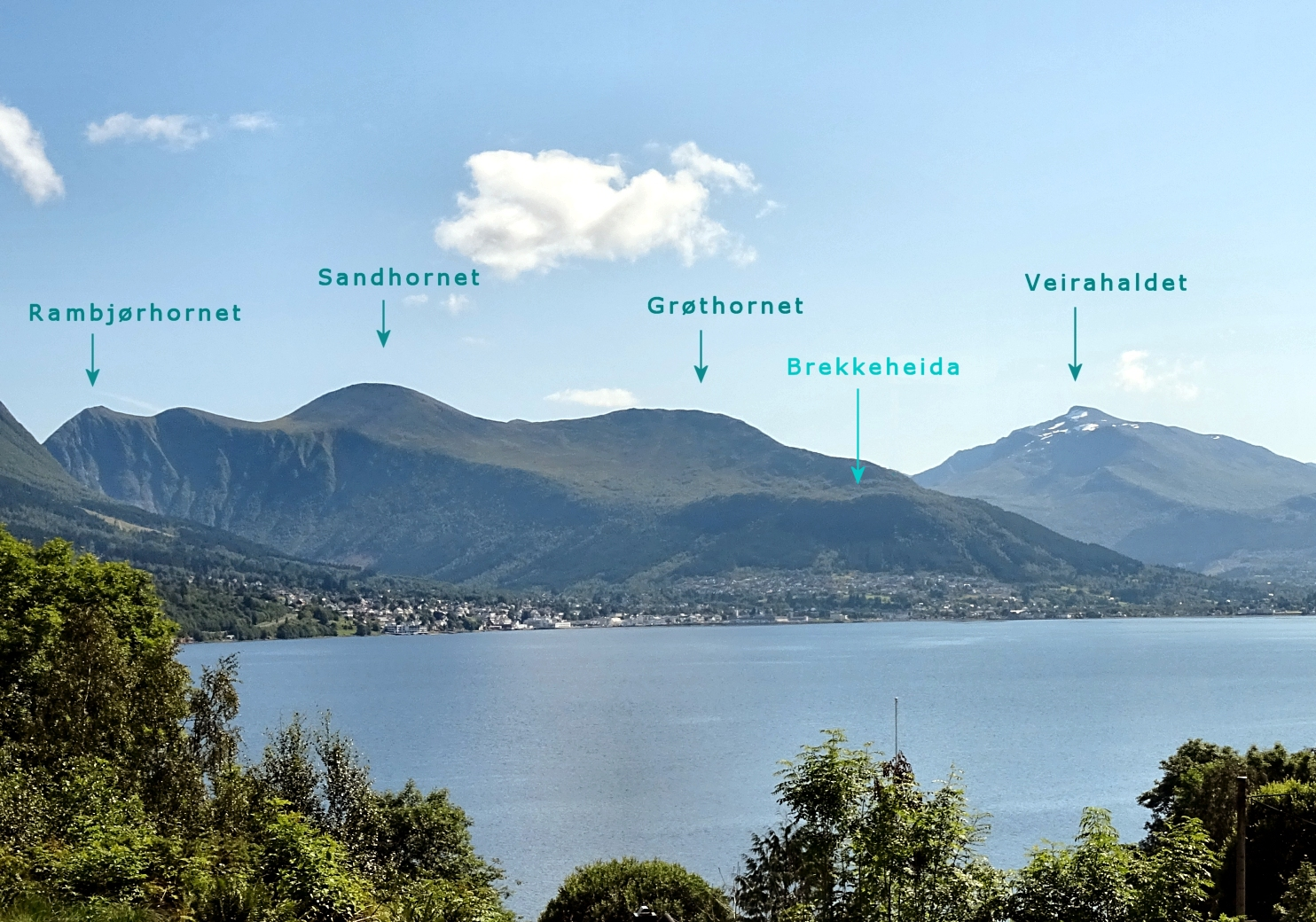
Mountains in Ørsta

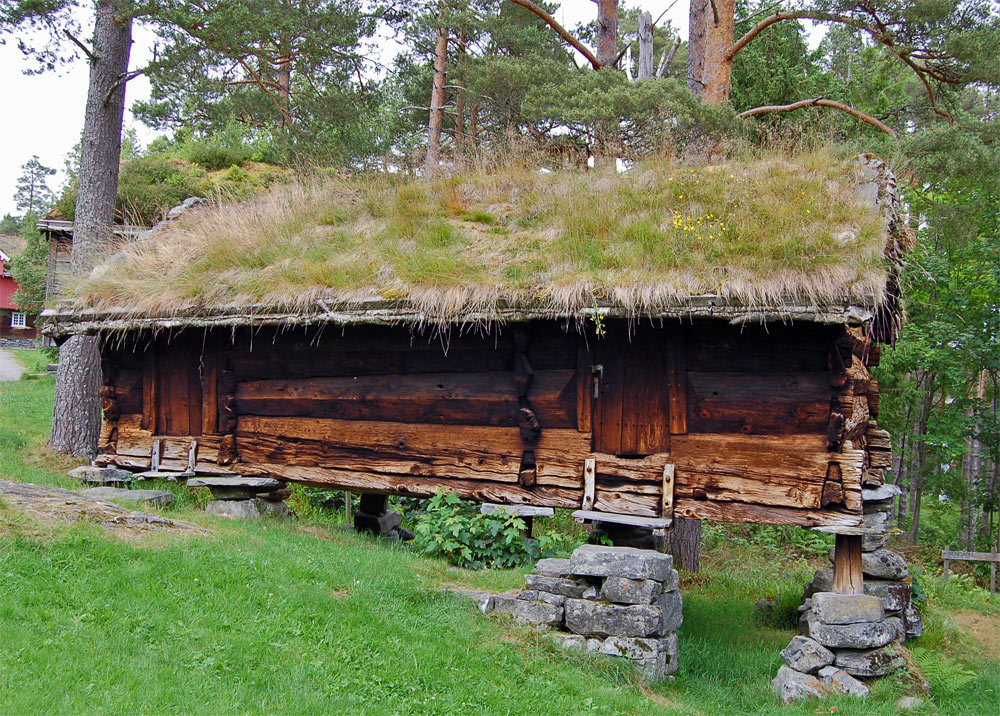
A stabbur from Ørsta (ca. 1600) in the Sunnmøre-Museum in Ålesund

Of the total area, 48% (386 square kilometres or 149 square miles) of the municipality is at an altitude of 600 metres (2,000 ft) or more above sea level.

Apart from the mountains, Ørsta's dominant geographical feature is fjords: Storfjorden in the north, Vartdalsfjorden, Ørstafjorden in the west, and Hjørundfjorden in the east. Volda Municipality lies to the south, Hareid Municipality and Ulstein Municipality are both across the fjord to the northwest, Sula Municipality lies across the fjord to the north, Sykkylven Municipality lies to the northeast, and Stranda Municipality lies to the southeast.

The municipality is also the heartland of the Sunnmørsalpene mountains, a particularly rugged and wild area of mountains in the southern part of Møre og Romsdal county. The highest point in the municipality is the 1,630.04-metre (5,347.9 ft) tall mountain Smørskredtindane. Other prolific peaks include Slogen at 1,564 metres (5,131 ft), Skårasalen at 1,542 metres (5,059 ft), Kolåstinden at 1,432 metres (4,698 ft), Ramoen at 1,419 metres (4,656 ft), Saudehornet at 1,303 metres (4,275 ft), and Romedalstinden at 1,295 metres (4,249 ft).

Ørsta has a temperate oceanic climate, with much precipitation. Autumn and winter are the wettest seasons.

Climate data for Ørsta - Volda airport 1991-2020 (74 m)
Month	Jan	Feb	Mar	Apr	May	Jun	Jul	Aug	Sep	Oct	Nov	Dec	Year
Daily mean °C (°F)	0.6 (33.1)	0 (32)	1.7 (35.1)	5.3 (41.5)	8.9 (48.0)	11.9 (53.4)	14.4 (57.9)	14 (57)	10.9 (51.6)	6.1 (43.0)	3 (37)	0.8 (33.4)	6.5 (43.6)
Average precipitation mm (inches)	185 (7.3)	155 (6.1)	160 (6.3)	110 (4.3)	75 (3.0)	85 (3.3)	100 (3.9)	130 (5.1)	245 (9.6)	230 (9.1)	225 (8.9)	240 (9.4)	1,940 (76.3)
Source: yr.no

== Economy ==
Important sectors are mechanical industry and furniture manufacturing, agriculture, commercial fishing, and aquaculture. The first two are predominant in the village of Ørsta while agriculture dominates in adjacent valleys like the Follestaddalen, Åmdalen, and Bondalen valleys. On the other hand, the northern part of the municipality has strong maritime traditions, with Vartdal being the home of one of the largest factory trawler fleets in Norway.

== Government ==
Ørsta Municipality is responsible for primary education (through 10th grade), outpatient health services, senior citizen services, welfare and other social services, zoning, economic development, and municipal roads and utilities. The municipality is governed by a municipal council of directly elected representatives. The mayor is indirectly elected by a vote of the municipal council. The municipality is under the jurisdiction of the Sunnmøre District Court and the Frostating Court of Appeal.

=== Municipal council ===
The municipal council (Kommunestyre) of Ørsta Municipality is made up of 33 representatives that are elected to four-year terms. The tables below show the current and historical composition of the council by political party.

Ørsta kommunestyre 2023–2027
Party name (in Nynorsk)	Number of representatives
Labour Party (Arbeidarpartiet)	5
Progress Party (Framstegspartiet)	10
Conservative Party (Høgre)	6
Christian Democratic Party (Kristeleg Folkeparti)	2
Centre Party (Senterpartiet)	6
Socialist Left Party (Sosialistisk Venstreparti)	3
Liberal Party (Venstre)	1
Total number of members:	33

Ørsta kommunestyre 2019–2023
Party name (in Nynorsk)	Number of representatives
Labour Party (Arbeidarpartiet)	4
Progress Party (Framstegspartiet)	5
Green Party (Miljøpartiet Dei Grøne)	1
Conservative Party (Høgre)	3
Christian Democratic Party (Kristeleg Folkeparti)	1
Centre Party (Senterpartiet)	16
Socialist Left Party (Sosialistisk Venstreparti)	2
Liberal Party (Venstre)	1
Total number of members:	33

Ørsta kommunestyre 2015–2019
Party name (in Nynorsk)	Number of representatives
Labour Party (Arbeidarpartiet)	5
Progress Party (Framstegspartiet)	5
Green Party (Miljøpartiet Dei Grøne)	1
Conservative Party (Høgre)	7
Christian Democratic Party (Kristeleg Folkeparti)	4
Centre Party (Senterpartiet)	8
Socialist Left Party (Sosialistisk Venstreparti)	1
Liberal Party (Venstre)	2
Total number of members:	33

Ørsta kommunestyre 2011–2015
Party name (in Nynorsk)	Number of representatives
Labour Party (Arbeidarpartiet)	7
Progress Party (Framstegspartiet)	6
Conservative Party (Høgre)	8
Christian Democratic Party (Kristeleg Folkeparti)	4
Centre Party (Senterpartiet)	5
Socialist Left Party (Sosialistisk Venstreparti)	1
Liberal Party (Venstre)	2
Total number of members:	33

Ørsta kommunestyre 2007–2011
Party name (in Nynorsk)	Number of representatives
Labour Party (Arbeidarpartiet)	7
Progress Party (Framstegspartiet)	10
Conservative Party (Høgre)	2
Christian Democratic Party (Kristeleg Folkeparti)	3
Centre Party (Senterpartiet)	7
Socialist Left Party (Sosialistisk Venstreparti)	2
Liberal Party (Venstre)	2
Total number of members:	33

Ørsta kommunestyre 2003–2007
Party name (in Nynorsk)	Number of representatives
Labour Party (Arbeidarpartiet)	6
Progress Party (Framstegspartiet)	8
Conservative Party (Høgre)	2
Christian Democratic Party (Kristeleg Folkeparti)	3
Centre Party (Senterpartiet)	8
Socialist Left Party (Sosialistisk Venstreparti)	4
Liberal Party (Venstre)	2
Total number of members:	33

Ørsta kommunestyre 1999–2003
Party name (in Nynorsk)	Number of representatives
Labour Party (Arbeidarpartiet)	8
Progress Party (Framstegspartiet)	5
Conservative Party (Høgre)	4
Christian Democratic Party (Kristeleg Folkeparti)	6
Centre Party (Senterpartiet)	9
Socialist Left Party (Sosialistisk Venstreparti)	4
Liberal Party (Venstre)	3
Total number of members:	39

Ørsta kommunestyre 1995–1999
Party name (in Nynorsk)	Number of representatives
Labour Party (Arbeidarpartiet)	7
Progress Party (Framstegspartiet)	4
Conservative Party (Høgre)	4
Christian Democratic Party (Kristeleg Folkeparti)	6
Centre Party (Senterpartiet)	13
Socialist Left Party (Sosialistisk Venstreparti)	2
Liberal Party (Venstre)	3
Total number of members:	39

Ørsta kommunestyre 1991–1995
Party name (in Nynorsk)	Number of representatives
Labour Party (Arbeidarpartiet)	7
Progress Party (Framstegspartiet)	2
Conservative Party (Høgre)	4
Christian Democratic Party (Kristeleg Folkeparti)	8
Centre Party (Senterpartiet)	11
Socialist Left Party (Sosialistisk Venstreparti)	4
Liberal Party (Venstre)	2
Cross-party list for Ørsta (Tverrpolitisk liste for Ørsta)	1
Total number of members:	39

Ørsta kommunestyre 1987–1991
Party name (in Nynorsk)	Number of representatives
Labour Party (Arbeidarpartiet)	8
Progress Party (Framstegspartiet)	3
Conservative Party (Høgre)	6
Christian Democratic Party (Kristeleg Folkeparti)	8
Centre Party (Senterpartiet)	6
Socialist Left Party (Sosialistisk Venstreparti)	2
Liberal Party (Venstre)	4
Cross-party list for Hjørundfjord (Tverrpolitisk liste for Hjørundfjord)	2
Total number of members:	39

Ørsta kommunestyre 1983–1987
Party name (in Nynorsk)	Number of representatives
Labour Party (Arbeidarpartiet)	8
Progress Party (Framstegspartiet)	1
Conservative Party (Høgre)	5
Christian Democratic Party (Kristeleg Folkeparti)	8
Centre Party (Senterpartiet)	7
Socialist Left Party (Sosialistisk Venstreparti)	2
Liberal Party (Venstre)	3
Cross-party election list for Ørsta (Tverrpolitisk valliste for Ørsta)	3
Cross-party election list for Hjørundfjord (Tverrpolitisk valliste for Hjørundfjord)	2
Total number of members:	39

Ørsta kommunestyre 1979–1983
Party name (in Nynorsk)	Number of representatives
Labour Party (Arbeidarpartiet)	7
Conservative Party (Høgre)	6
Christian Democratic Party (Kristeleg Folkeparti)	8
Centre Party (Senterpartiet)	8
Socialist Left Party (Sosialistisk Venstreparti)	1
Liberal Party (Venstre)	4
Cross-party election list for Ørsta (Tverrpolitisk valliste for Ørsta)	2
Cross-party list for Hjørundfjord (Tverrpolitisk liste for Hjørundfjord)	3
Total number of members:	39

Ørsta kommunestyre 1975–1979
Party name (in Nynorsk)	Number of representatives
Labour Party (Arbeidarpartiet)	6
Conservative Party (Høgre)	3
Christian Democratic Party (Kristeleg Folkeparti)	9
New People's Party (Nye Folkepartiet)	2
Centre Party (Senterpartiet)	10
Socialist Left Party (Sosialistisk Venstreparti)	1
Liberal Party (Venstre)	4
Cross-party Nature and Environment List (Tverrpolitisk Natur- og Miljøvernliste)	1
Cross-party list for Hjørundfjord (Tverrpolitisk liste for Hjørundfjord)	3
Total number of members:	39

Ørsta kommunestyre 1971–1975
Party name (in Nynorsk)	Number of representatives
Labour Party (Arbeidarpartiet)	8
Conservative Party (Høgre)	2
Christian Democratic Party (Kristeleg Folkeparti)	8
Centre Party (Senterpartiet)	13
Socialist People's Party (Sosialistisk Folkeparti)	2
Liberal Party (Venstre)	6
Total number of members:	39

Ørsta kommunestyre 1967–1971
Party name (in Nynorsk)	Number of representatives
Labour Party (Arbeidarpartiet)	8
Conservative Party (Høgre)	3
Christian Democratic Party (Kristeleg Folkeparti)	8
Centre Party (Senterpartiet)	10
Socialist People's Party (Sosialistisk Folkeparti)	2
Liberal Party (Venstre)	7
Local List(s) (Lokale lister)	1
Total number of members:	39

Ørsta kommunestyre 1963–1967
Party name (in Nynorsk)	Number of representatives
Labour Party (Arbeidarpartiet)	9
Conservative Party (Høgre)	2
Christian Democratic Party (Kristeleg Folkeparti)	9
Centre Party (Senterpartiet)	9
Liberal Party (Venstre)	9
Local List(s) (Lokale lister)	1
Total number of members:	39
Note: On 1 January 1964, Hjørundfjord Municipality and Vartdal Municipality became part of Ørsta Municipality.

Ørsta heradsstyre 1959–1963
Party name (in Nynorsk)	Number of representatives
Labour Party (Arbeidarpartiet)	5
Conservative Party (Høgre)	2
Christian Democratic Party (Kristeleg Folkeparti)	5
Centre Party (Senterpartiet)	5
Liberal Party (Venstre)	6
Local List(s) (Lokale lister)	2
Total number of members:	25

Ørsta heradsstyre 1955–1959
Party name (in Nynorsk)	Number of representatives
Labour Party (Arbeidarpartiet)	5
Conservative Party (Høgre)	1
Christian Democratic Party (Kristeleg Folkeparti)	6
Farmers' Party (Bondepartiet)	5
Liberal Party (Venstre)	5
Local List(s) (Lokale lister)	3
Total number of members:	25

Ørsta heradsstyre 1951–1955
Party name (in Nynorsk)	Number of representatives
Labour Party (Arbeidarpartiet)	5
Christian Democratic Party (Kristeleg Folkeparti)	5
Farmers' Party (Bondepartiet)	5
Liberal Party (Venstre)	5
Total number of members:	20

Ørsta heradsstyre 1947–1951
Party name (in Nynorsk)	Number of representatives
Labour Party (Arbeidarpartiet)	5
Local List(s) (Lokale lister)	15
Total number of members:	20

Ørsta heradsstyre 1945–1947
Party name (in Nynorsk)	Number of representatives
Labour Party (Arbeidarpartiet)	6
Local List(s) (Lokale lister)	14
Total number of members:	20

Ørsta heradsstyre 1937–1941*
Party name (in Nynorsk)	Number of representatives
Labour Party (Arbeidarpartiet)	4
Local List(s) (Lokale lister)	16
Total number of members:	20
Note: Due to the German occupation of Norway during World War II, no elections were held for new municipal councils until after the war ended in 1945.

=== Mayors ===
The mayor (Nynorsk: ordfører) of Ørsta Municipality is the political leader of the municipality and the chairperson of the municipal council. Here is a list of people who have held this position:

- 1883–1885: Hans A. Velle
- 1886–1893: Sivert Nossen
- 1894–1901: Jon I. Skare
- 1902–1910: Lars A. Rebbestad
- 1911–1916: Peder A. Moe
- 1917–1934: Laurits N. Myklebust
- 1935–1941: Otto N. Øye
- 1941–1945: Hans Brungot
- 1945–1945: Otto N. Øye
- 1946–1951: Peter Kjeldseth Moe (Ap)
- 1952–1955: Martin B. Moe (V)
- 1956–1959: Ragnar Unhjem (KrF)
- 1960–1967: Pål Sandvik (V)
- 1968–1973: Jakob E. Øye (Sp)
- 1974–1979: Karsten Standal (Sp)
- 1980–1983: Oddmund Breiteig (Ap)
- 1984–1991: Sigbjørn Kvistad (KrF)
- 1992–2003: Nils Taklo (Sp)
- 2003–2007: Hans Olav Myklebust (FrP)
- 2007–2011: Gudny Fagerhol (Ap)
- 2011–2015: Rune Hovde (H)
- 2015–2023: Stein Aam (Sp)
- 2023–present: Per Are Sørheim (H)

== Transportation ==
Ørsta–Volda Airport (in Hovdebygda) is the regional airport for people living in the municipalities of Ørsta, Volda, Vanylven, Sande, Ulstein, Hareid, and Herøy. European Route E39 transects the municipality in a north–south direction. Ørsta Municipality is linked to Sula Municipality and Sykkylven Municipality by a ferry at Festøy, the northernmost point in Ørsta. It is also linked to Ulstein Municipality (and Hareid, Herøy, and Sande municipalities) by the Eiksund Tunnel, an undersea tunnel that opened on 23 February 2008 that is, currently, the world's deepest at 287 metres (942 ft) below the sea surface.

== Notable people ==
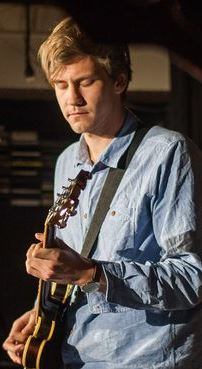
Torgeir Standal, 2013

- Ivar Aasen (1813–1896), a Norwegian language philologist, lexicographer, playwright, and poet.
- Anders Hovden (1860–1943), a Church of Norway clergyman, hymnwriter, poet, and author
- Njål Hole (1914–1988), a chemical engineer and nuclear physicist
- Torbjørn Digernes (born 1947), a physicist and professor of marine systems design
- Kari Sørbø (born 1955), a radio personality who was brought up in Ørsta
- Eldar Sætre (born 1956), a businessman and CEO of Equinor
- Bjarte Engeset (born 1958), a classical conductor
- Odd Magne Gridseth (1959–2025), a jazz musician and composer
- Yngve Sætre (born 1962), a record producer, musician on vocals, and keyboard
- Marit Velle Kile (born 1978), an actress in film and on TV
- Audun Ellingsen (born 1979), a jazz musician who plays upright bass
- Torgeir Standal (born 1990), a jazz guitarist
- Vassendgutane (formed 1996), a band that plays country and danseband music
