= Store-Standal =

Village in Ørsta Municipality, Norway

Store-Standal Indre Standal
- Village
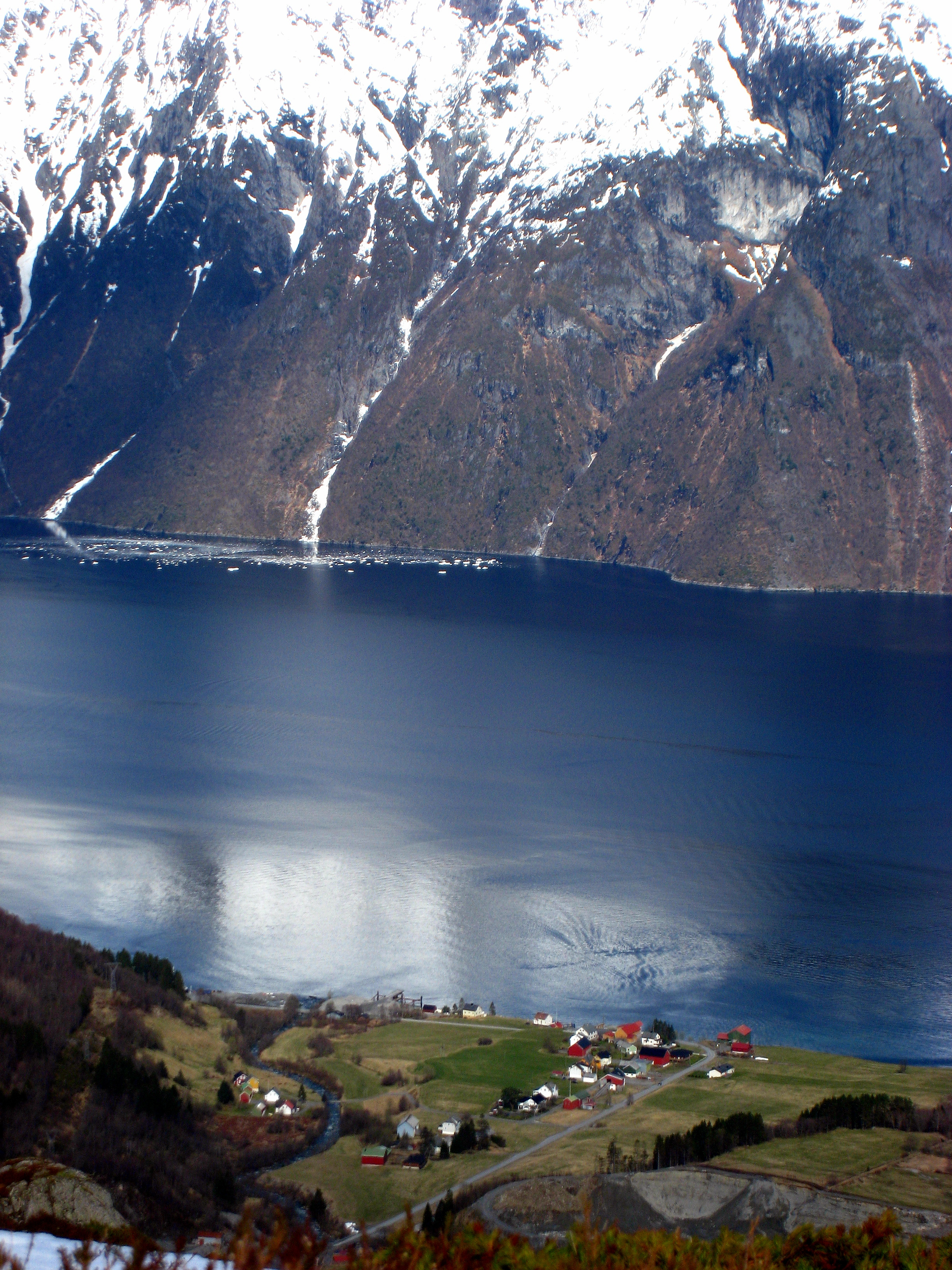
- View of Store-Standal with Hjørundfjorden in background
- Interactive map of Store-Standal
- Location within Møre og Romsdal Location within Norway
- Coordinates: 62.2638°N 6.4256°E
- Country: Norway
- Region: Western Norway
- County: Møre og Romsdal
- District: Sunnmøre
- Municipality: Ørsta
- Elevation: 4 m (13 ft)
- Time zone: UTC+01:00 (CET)
  - Summer (DST): UTC+02:00 (CEST)
- Post Code: 6184 Storestandal

Store-Standal is a small village in the Hjørundfjorden area of Ørsta Municipality in Møre og Romsdal, Norway. The village has a population of approximately 20 people. Store-Standal is located along the Hjørundfjorden midway between the villages of Sæbø and Festøy. The village is located among the Sunnmørsalpene mountains, about 5.5 kilometres (3.4 mi) east of the mountain Kolåstinden. There is a ferry service from this village to Trandal (across the fjord) and the on to Sæbø (further down the fjord).

As with many villages in rural areas, populations have been gradually decreasing as living off the land is no longer viable in modernized countries. In an effort to increase the influx of people again, Store-Standal is undertaking projects to modernize the local industries and create tourism. Here there is a new power station, wireless internet service, and development of an Alpine Center for new residents and tourists.
