= Skårasalen =

Mountain in Sunnmøre, Norway

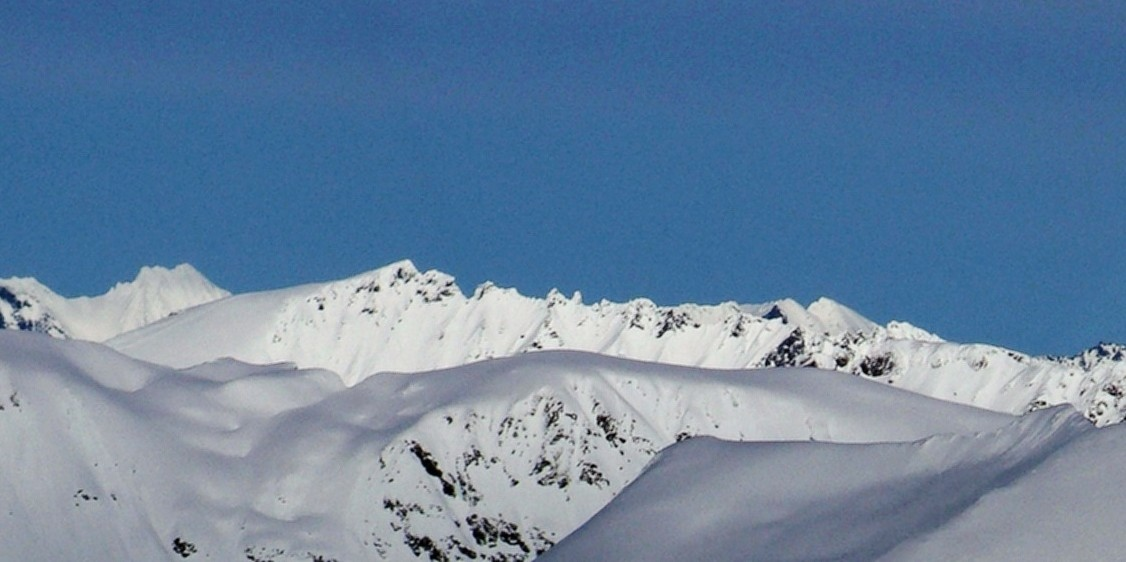
- Skårasalen and its southern ragged ridge seen from Eidskyrkja (in the south). Parts of Storetind in front.

Highest point
- Elevation: 1,542 m (5,059 ft)
- Prominence: 1,383 m (4,537 ft)
- Isolation: 6.8 km (4.2 mi) to Jakta
- Listing: #7 at List of peaks in Norway by prominence
- Coordinates: 62.1656°N 6.4859°E

Geography
- Interactive map of the mountain
- Location: Møre og Romsdal, Norway
- Parent range: Sunnmørsalpene
- Topo map: 1219 III Hjørundfjord

Skårasalen is a mountain in Ørsta Municipality in Møre og Romsdal county, Norway. The 1,542-metre (5,059 ft) tall mountain has the seventh largest prominence (1,383 metres or 4,537 feet) of all mountains in Norway. The mountain is located about 5 kilometres (3 mi) south of the village of Sæbø and the Bondalen valley in the Hjørundfjorden area of the municipality. The nearby mountain, Jakta, lies directly to the east on the opposite side of the fjord.

Skårasalen lies within the Sunnmørsalpene mountain range along the southern shores of the Hjørundfjorden. Access is easiest from the Kvistad valley on the western side. An alternative descent for skiing is a steep route straight down to the fjord on the eastern side, and then to return via a hired boat.

== See also ==
- List of mountains of Norway
