= Ørsta (village) =

Village in Ørsta Municipality, Norway

- Town
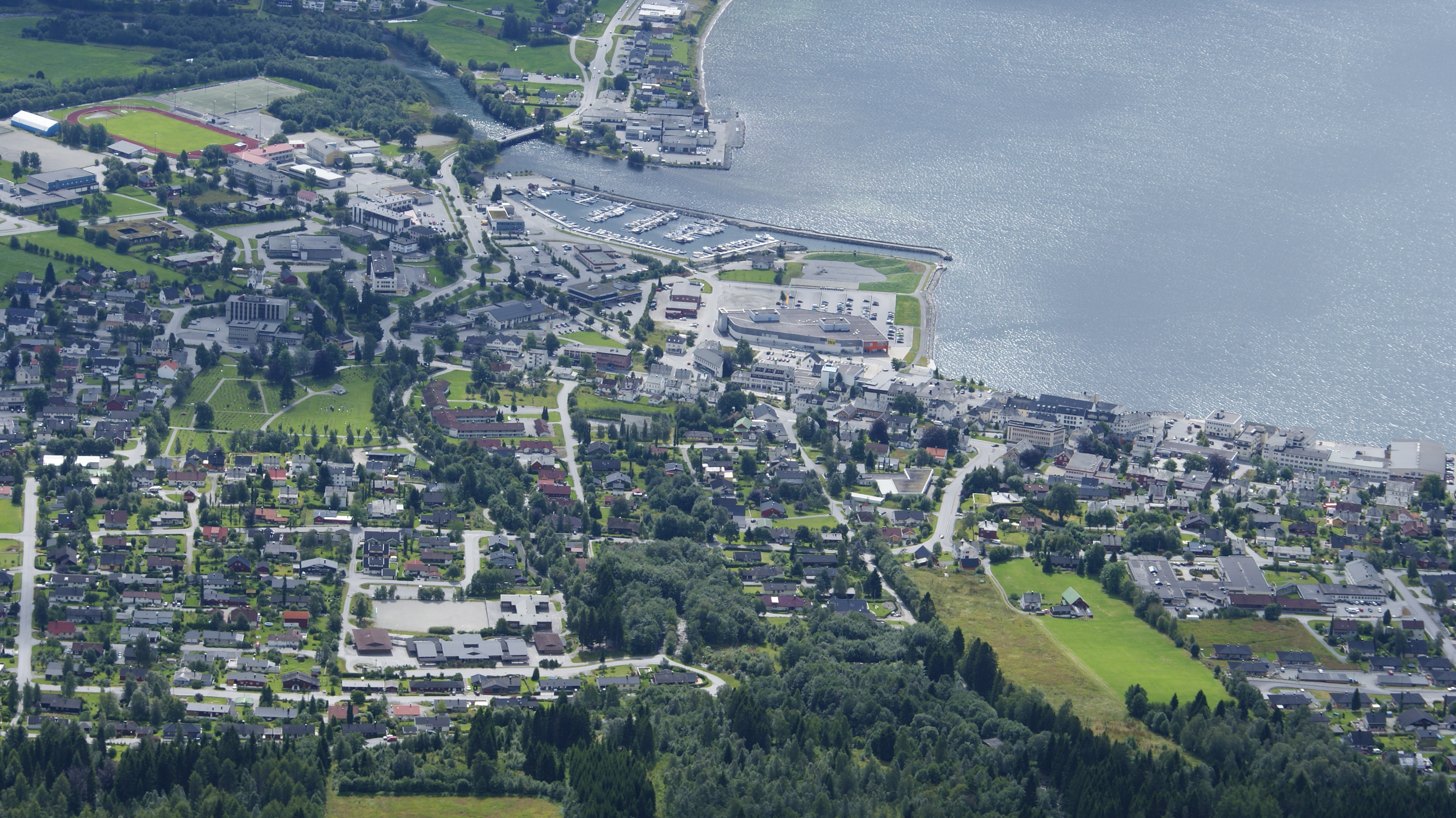
- View of the village
- Interactive map of Ørsta
- Location within Møre og Romsdal Location within Norway
- Coordinates: 62.1998°N 6.1290°E
- Country: Norway
- Region: Western Norway
- County: Møre og Romsdal
- District: Sunnmøre
- Municipality: Ørsta

Area
  - Total: 5.84 km^{2} (2.25 sq mi)
- Elevation: 6 m (20 ft)

Population (2024)
  - Total: 7,609
  - Density: 1,303/km^{2} (3,370/sq mi)
- Time zone: UTC+01:00 (CET)
  - Summer (DST): UTC+02:00 (CEST)
- Post Code: 6150 Ørsta

Ørsta is the administrative centre of Ørsta Municipality in Møre og Romsdal, Norway. The village is located at the innermost part of the Ørstafjorden, surrounded by the Sunnmørsalpene mountains. The village of Volda is located about 10 kilometres (6.2 mi) southwest of Ørsta.

The 5.84-square-kilometre (1,440-acre) village has a population (2024) of 7,609 and a population density of 1,303 inhabitants per square kilometre (3,370/sq mi). This makes it the fourth largest urban area in all of Møre og Romsdal county.

Ørsta is the seat of the municipal government and it is also the commercial centre of the municipality. There is a shopping center, industry, and Ørsta–Volda Airport (on the southwest side of the village area). Ørsta Church is also located in central part of Ørsta. A regional high school and the Møre Folkehøgskule are both located in Ørsta.
