= Sunnmørsalpane =

Mountain range in Sunnmøre, Norway

- Sunnmørsalpene
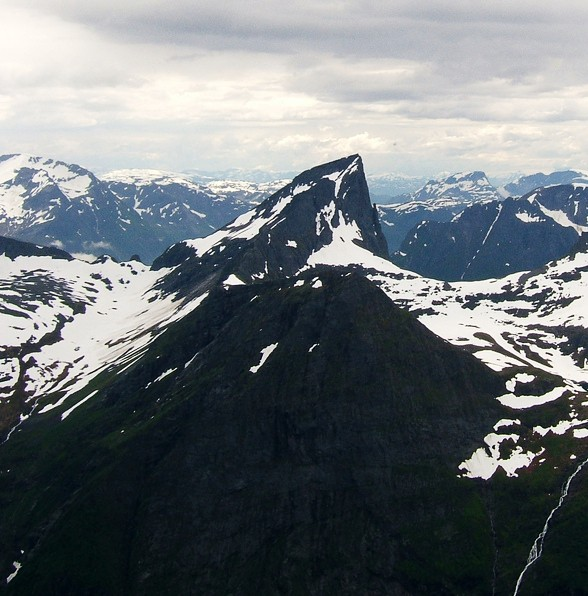
- Jakta seen from Slogen in the summer.

Highest point
- Peak: Kvitegga
- Elevation: 1,717 m (5,633 ft)
- Coordinates: 62°05′41″N 06°42′07″E

Geography
- Location: Møre og Romsdal, Norway
- Range coordinates: 62°13′N 6°34′E

Sunnmørsalpane (English: Sunnmøre Alps) is a collective term for the mountains range in the Sunnmøre region of Møre og Romsdal county, Norway. The mountain range encircles the Hjørundfjorden in the municipalities of Volda, Ørsta, Stranda, and Sykkylven. These mountains have peaks reaching 1,700 metres (5,600 ft) straight up from the fjord.

Well-known peaks include Slogen, Randers Topp, Jakta, Kolåstinden, Hornindalsrokken, Kvitegga, Skårasalen, and Råna. The area is well known to hiking and skiing enthusiasts, especially for its long skiing season until beginning of June. The mountain range is visible from Ålesund's eastern suburbs.

In the heart of Sunnmøre there is a wondrous alpine world of tall, steep, jagged mountains, which constitute Sunnmøre's landmark and presents the most striking image of its peculiar and magnificent scenery. And amidst this chaos of edges and summits, the Hjørundfjord cuts into the south as a powerful wedge, 36 km long and 2 km wide.

— Kristofer Randers (1890)

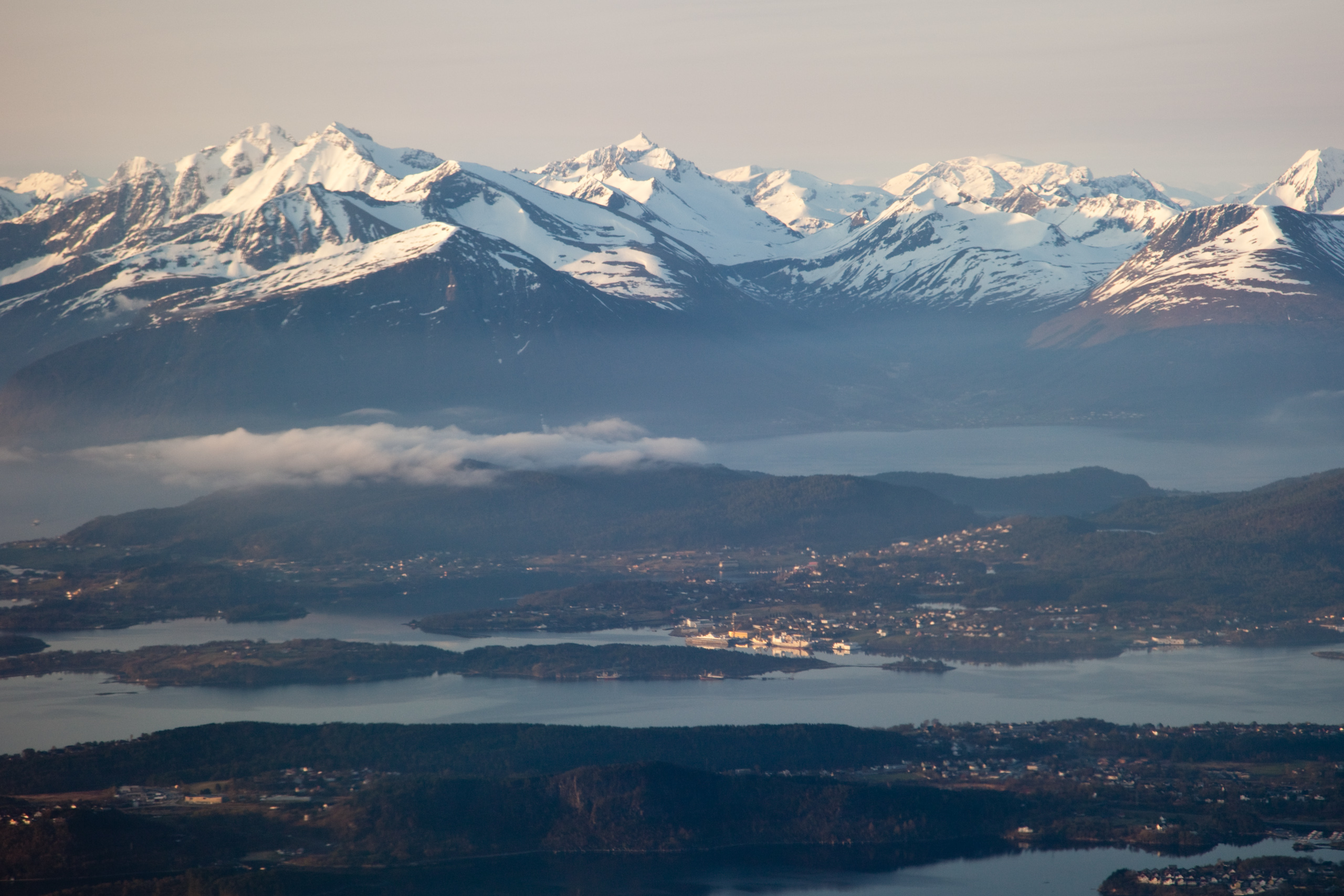
Sunnmørsalpane as seen from air over Ålesund.
