= Hjørundfjorden =

Fjord in Møre og Romsdal, Norway

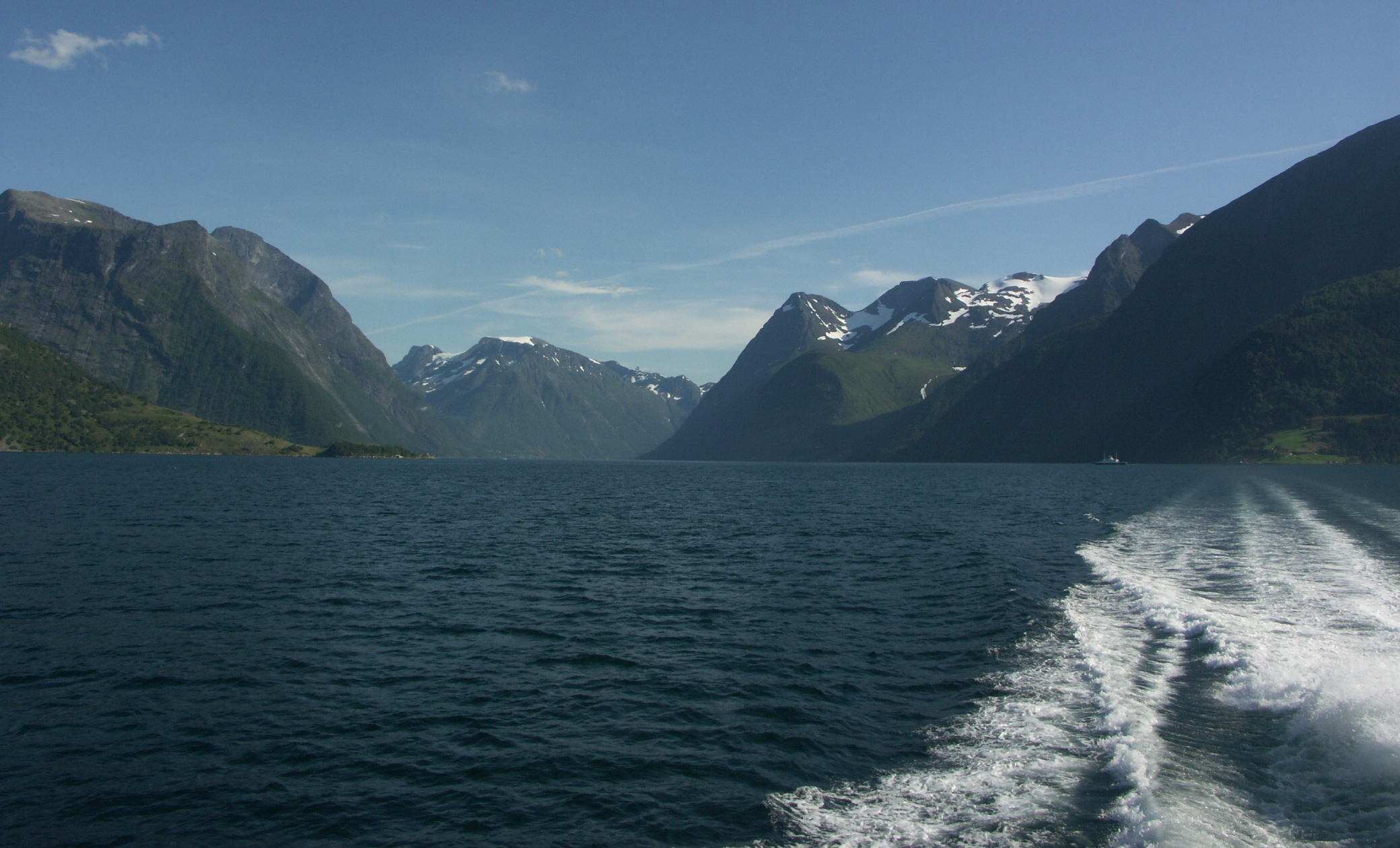
- View of the Sunnmørsalpene from the Hjørundfjorden
- Interactive map of the fjord
- Location: Møre og Romsdal, Norway
- Coordinates: 62.3479°N 6.3951°E
- Type: Fjord
- Primary outflows: Storfjorden
- Basin countries: Norway
- Max. length: 20 kilometres (12 mi)
- Max. width: 3 kilometres (1.9 mi)
- Max. depth: 441 metres (1,447 ft)

Hjørundfjorden is a fjord in the traditional district of Sunnmøre in Møre og Romsdal county, Norway. It is located mostly within Ørsta Municipality, although part of the mouth of the fjord lies in Sykkylven Municipality and the innermost part of the fjord lies in Volda Municipality. The 20-kilometre (12 mi) long fjord is an arm off of the larger Storfjorden. Villages along the shores of the fjord include Molaupen, Hundeidvik, Trandal, Sæbø, and Store-Standal.

The Hjørundfjorden is surrounded by the Sunnmørsalpene mountain range, with mountain peaks reaching 1,700 metres (5,600 ft) straight up from the fjord, including Skårasalen and Skopphorn. Both sides of the fjord are heavily wooded, the result of extensive rainfall in one of the world's wettest fjords.

== History ==
The area surrounding the Hjørundfjorden was part of the old Hjørundfjord Municipality from 1838 until 1964.

== See also ==
- List of Norwegian fjords
