= Tangen Church (Buskerud) =

Church in Buskerud, Norway

- Tangen kirke
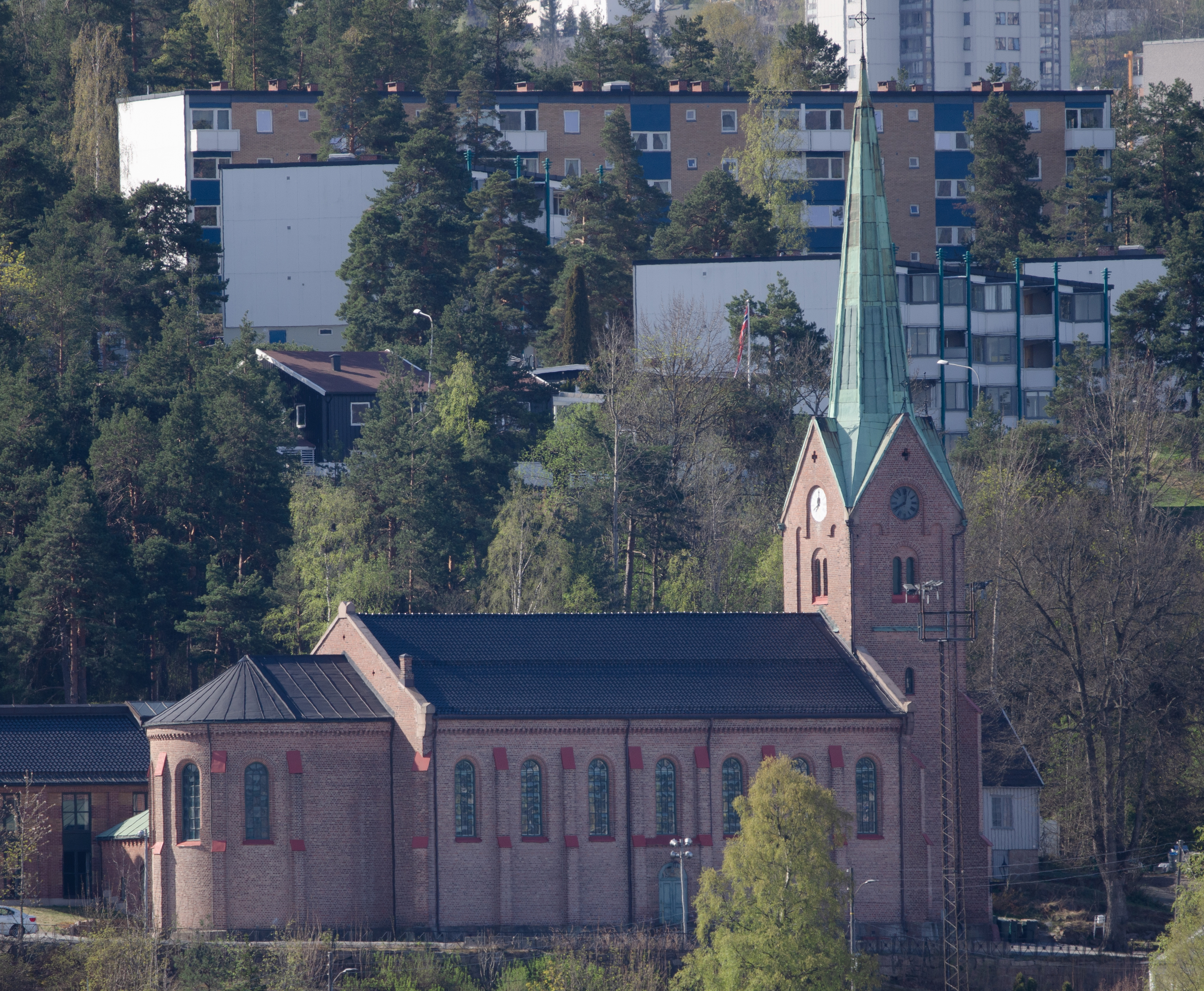
- View of the church
- Tangen Church
- 59°43′48″N 10°14′05″E
- Location: Drammen Municipality, Buskerud
- Country: Norway
- Denomination: Church of Norway
- Churchmanship: Evangelical Lutheran

History
- Status: Parish church
- Founded: 1696
- Consecrated: 25 Jan 1854

Architecture
- Functional status: Active
- Architect: Heinrich Ernst Schirmer
- Architectural type: Long church
- Completed: 1854 (172 years ago)

Specifications
- Capacity: 600
- Materials: Brick

Administration
- Diocese: Tunsberg bispedømme
- Deanery: Drammen og Lier prosti
- Parish: Tangen og Strømsø
- Norwegian Cultural Heritage Site
- Type: Church
- Status: Listed
- ID: 85607

Tangen Church (Norwegian: Tangen kirke) is a parish church of the Church of Norway in Drammen Municipality in Buskerud county, Norway. It is located in the village of Tangen. It is one of the churches for the Tangen og Strømsø parish which is part of the Drammen og Lier prosti (deanery) in the Diocese of Tunsberg. The red brick church was built in a long church design in 1854 using plans drawn up by the architect Heinrich Ernst Schirmer. The church seats about 600 people.

== History ==
The first church at Tangen was a wooden cruciform church called "Gjenløserens kirke" that was completed in 1696. Soon after it became clear that the site was problematic. The bedrock made it difficult to bury coffins in many places on the church grounds. In 1832, a cemetery was built about 1 kilometre (0.62 mi) further east at "Løkken" on the Hedensrud farm. In 1837, Christian H. Grosch was asked to come up with plans for the restoration of the churches in the city of Drammen. He concluded that Tangen Church was so bad that it was pointless to spend money on it. It was then proposed to demolish it and let the congregation use Strømsø Church instead. The congregation opposed this, and in 1847 Heinrich Ernst Schirmer presented plans for a new brick church at Tangen. The old church was demolished in 1849. Considerable terrain work was carried out to avoid bedrock problems with the new church. The foundation stone was laid in 1850, and the new church was consecrated on 25 January 1854.

The church was renovated and redesigned for the 100th anniversary in 1954 under the leadership of Arnstein Arneberg. In 1992, an addition was built on the south side. The extension is 270 square metres (2,900 ft^{2}) and has two floors.

== Media gallery ==

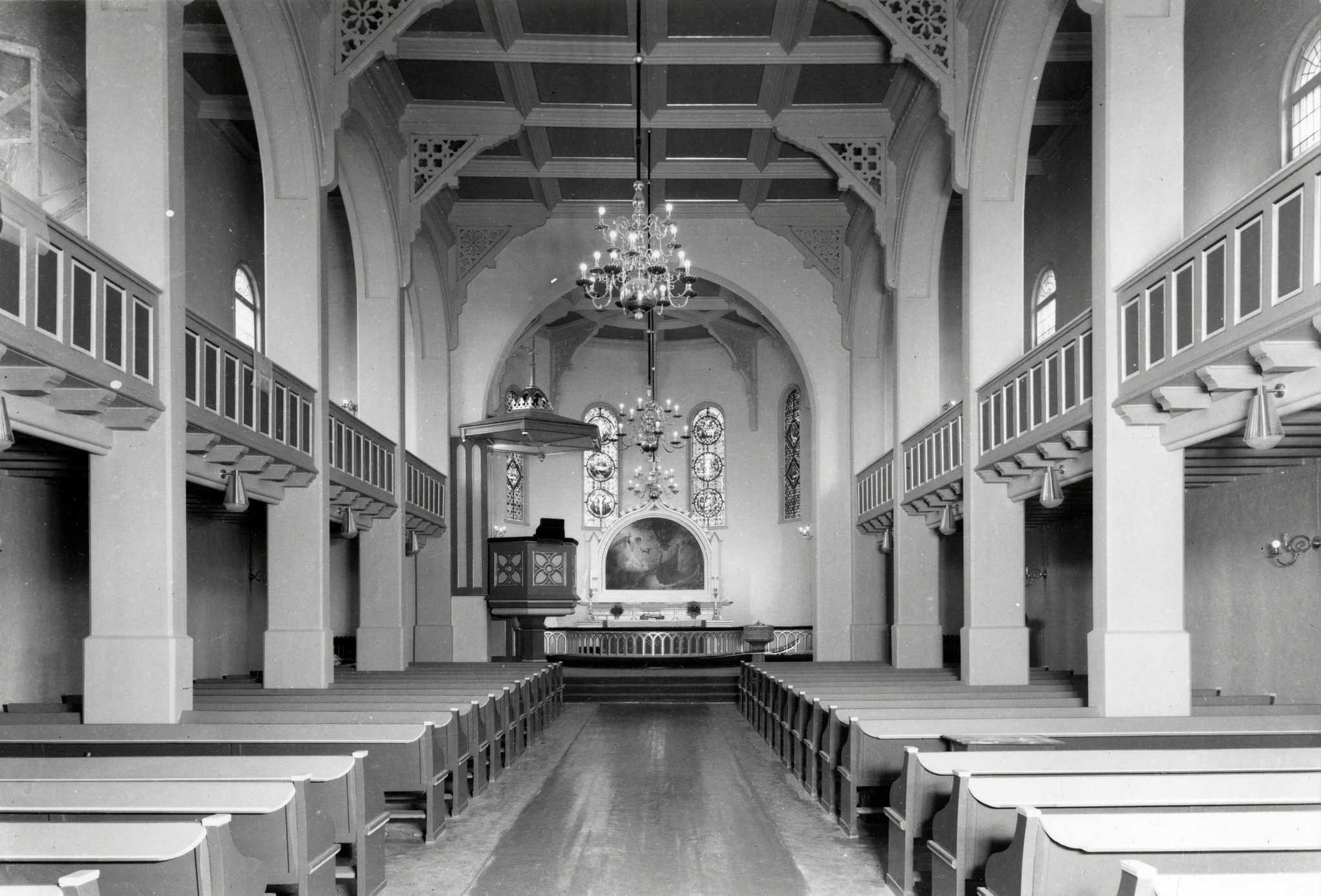

== See also ==
- List of churches in Tunsberg
