= Herman Major Schirmer =

Norwegian architect (1845–1913)

Herman Major Schirmer (20 June 1845 – 11 April 1913) was a Norwegian architect, educator and historian of art. He has been described as "one of the chief ideologues" of Norwegian romantic nationalism. He was also a diligent writer and Norway's first national antiquary.

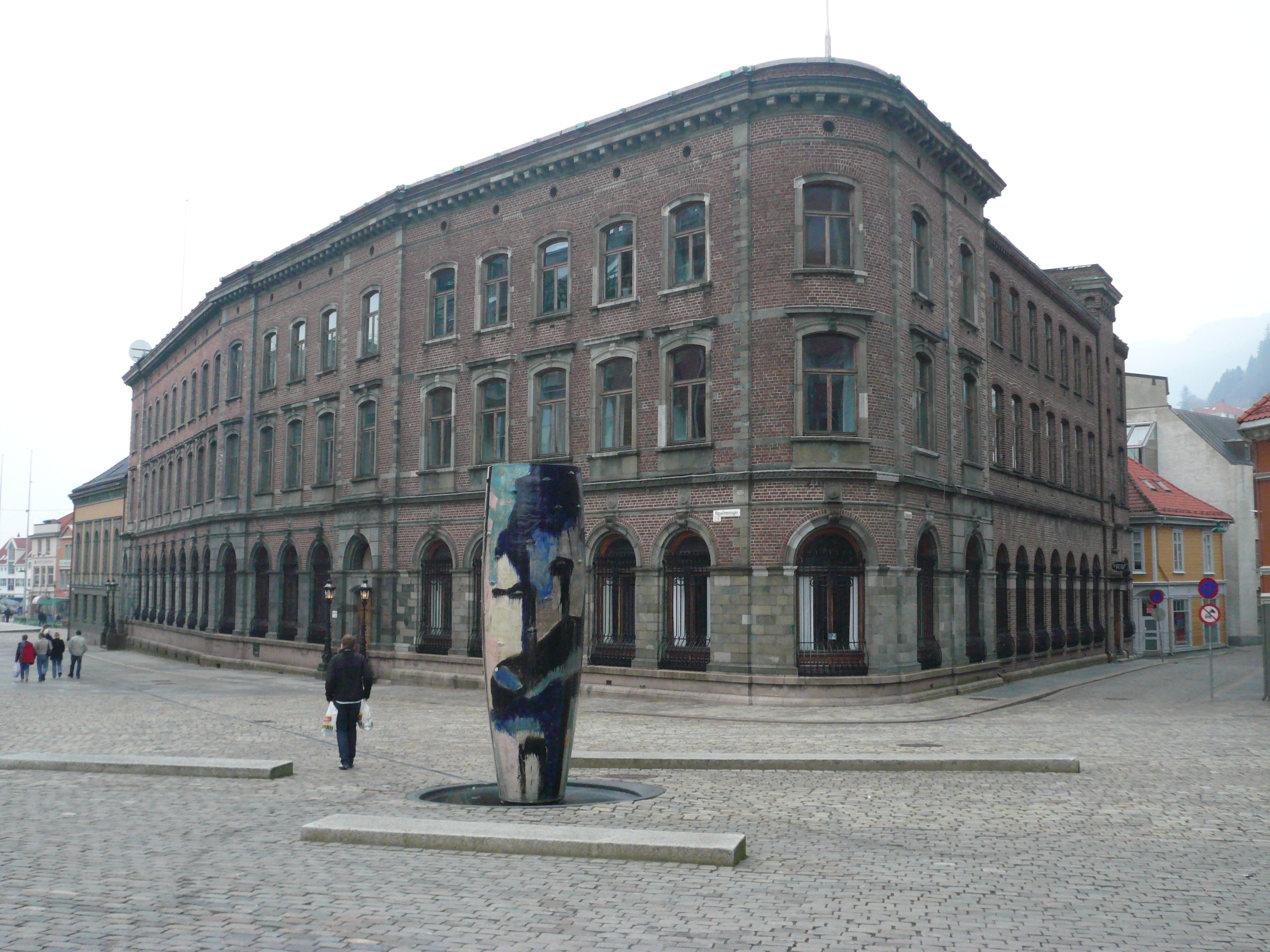
Bergens Kreditbank Building Banco Rotto (1876)

== Biography ==
Schirmer was born in Kristiania (now Oslo), Norway. He was the son of the architect Heinrich Ernst Schirmer (1814–1887) and his wife Sophie Ottilia Major (1821–61). His brother was architect Adolf Schirmer and his uncle psychiatrist Herman Wedel Major. At the age of 15, Schirmer was educated in drawing by the German-Norwegian architect and painter Franz Wilhelm Schiertz. Two years later, he worked in his father's architect office before receiving a travel grant from the government in 1866. He travelled to Germany to study architecture and history of art at the Dresden Academy of Fine Arts. He also travelled to Italy, Switzerland and Sweden at the end of the 1860s.

Even though Schirmer was not an overly prolific architect, he did design the Bergens Kreditbank Building (commonly known as Banco Rotto) in Bergen in 1876. He also designed Heftyevillaen på Frognerseteren, a villa in the neighborhood of Frognerseteren in Oslo (1867); and Eventyrgården at Kristian IVs gate in Oslo (1873).

Schirmer preferred teaching and studying architecture to designing structures. He became most famous through his work at the Royal Drawing School, which he renamed to Norwegian National Academy of Craft and Art Industry in 1911. Schirmer taught at the school for 39 years, from 1873 to 1912, where he had a large influence on architecture in Norway. He notably drew the first draft for the preservation of the Nidaros Cathedral. In 1891, he founded Yngre Arkitektforening ("Younger Architect Association"). He chaired the Society for the Preservation of Ancient Norwegian Monuments from 1899 to 1911, and published many treatises in the society's yearbook.

Schirmer was also a diligent writer who penned Kristkirken i Nidaros ("The Christchurch in Nidaros") and Femti daterede norske bygninger fra middelalderen ("Fifty Dated Norwegian Buildings From the Middle Ages"). On 3 June 1905, he married Annette Magdalene Riis Wiese (1874–1927).In 1913, five months before his death, he was appointed the first national antiquary of Norway.
