= Østre Aker Church =

- Østre Aker kirke
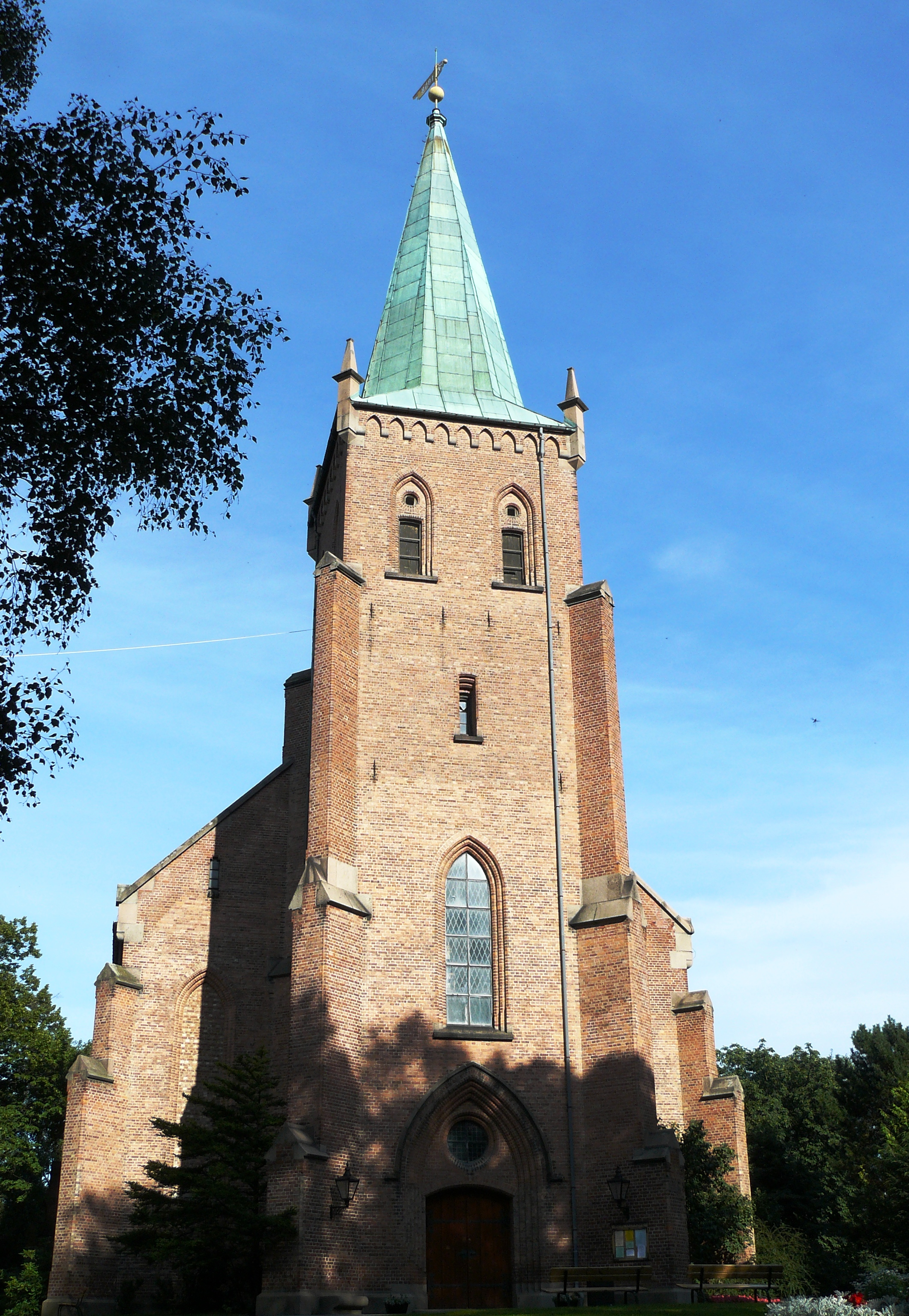
- Østre Aker Church
- 59°55′20″N 10°49′12″E
- Location: Ulvenveien 114, Oslo,
- Country: Norway
- Denomination: Church of Norway
- Churchmanship: Evangelical Lutheran
- Website: kirken.no

History
- Status: Parish church
- Consecrated: 1860

Architecture
- Functional status: Active
- Architect: Heinrich Ernst Schirmer
- Style: Neo Gothic

Specifications
- Capacity: 500
- Materials: Brick, Wood

Administration
- Diocese: Diocese of Oslo
- Parish: Østre Aker og Haugerud

Østre Aker Church is a parish church at the neighborhood of Ulven in northeastern part of Oslo, Norway. The church building from 1860 in neo-Gothic style has exterior walls of brick, while the interior walls are covered with wood. The master masonry brothers Carl, Ferdinand and Albert Unger was commissioned to make the church the most alike Vestre Aker Church as possible. Østre Aker Church was consecrated 5 September 1860 with, among others, Prince Oscar present. Electricity was installed in 1925 and the church got chandeliers in 1928. Architect Helge Thiis was at the same time commissioned to make changes to improve the church interior.

The church is in a picturesque landscape and surrounded by many large trees on a green cemetery. In front of the church's main entrance is the sculpture "Hvilende kvinne" ("Reclining woman"), made by sculptor Maria Vigeland from 1970.

Inside the church are eight monolith columns, carved in whole pieces of local grefsensyenitt. The church has a rose window promoting the church, designed by Frøydis Haavardsholm and created by art glazier G. A. Larsen. It shows blessing by Jesus of small children. The baptismal font in sandstone is from 1860. The altarpiece in wood from 1928 is created by woodcarver Thorleif Sohlberg. The pulpit is located to the left of the chancel. The origin of the 46-voice church organ from the second half of the nineteenth century is disputed.

Østre Aker Church is listed 85915 by the Norwegian Directorate for Cultural Heritage.
