= Ørsta =

Ørsta may refer to:

== Places ==
- Ørsta (village), an urban village area within Ørsta Municipality in Møre og Romsdal county, Norway
- Ørsta Municipality, a municipality in Møre og Romsdal county, Norway
- Ørsta Church, a church in Ørsta Municipality in Møre og Romsdal county, Norway

== Other ==
- Ørsta IL, a sports club based in Ørsta Municipality in Møre og Romsdal county, Norway
- Ørsta Ski Centre, a skiing facility in Ørsta Municipality in Møre og Romsdal county, Norway
- Ørsta-Volda Airport, an airport in Ørsta Municipality in Møre og Romsdal county, Norway
