= Heinrich Ernst Schirmer =

German architect (1814–1887)

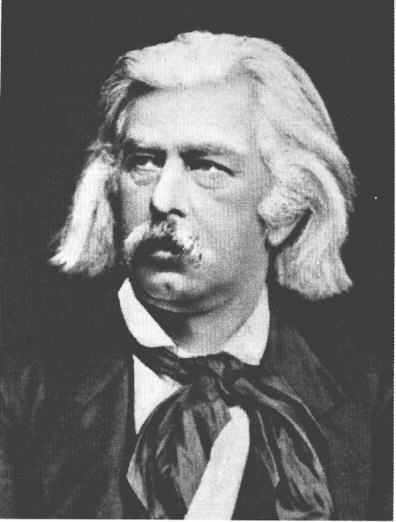
Heinrich Ernst Schirmer

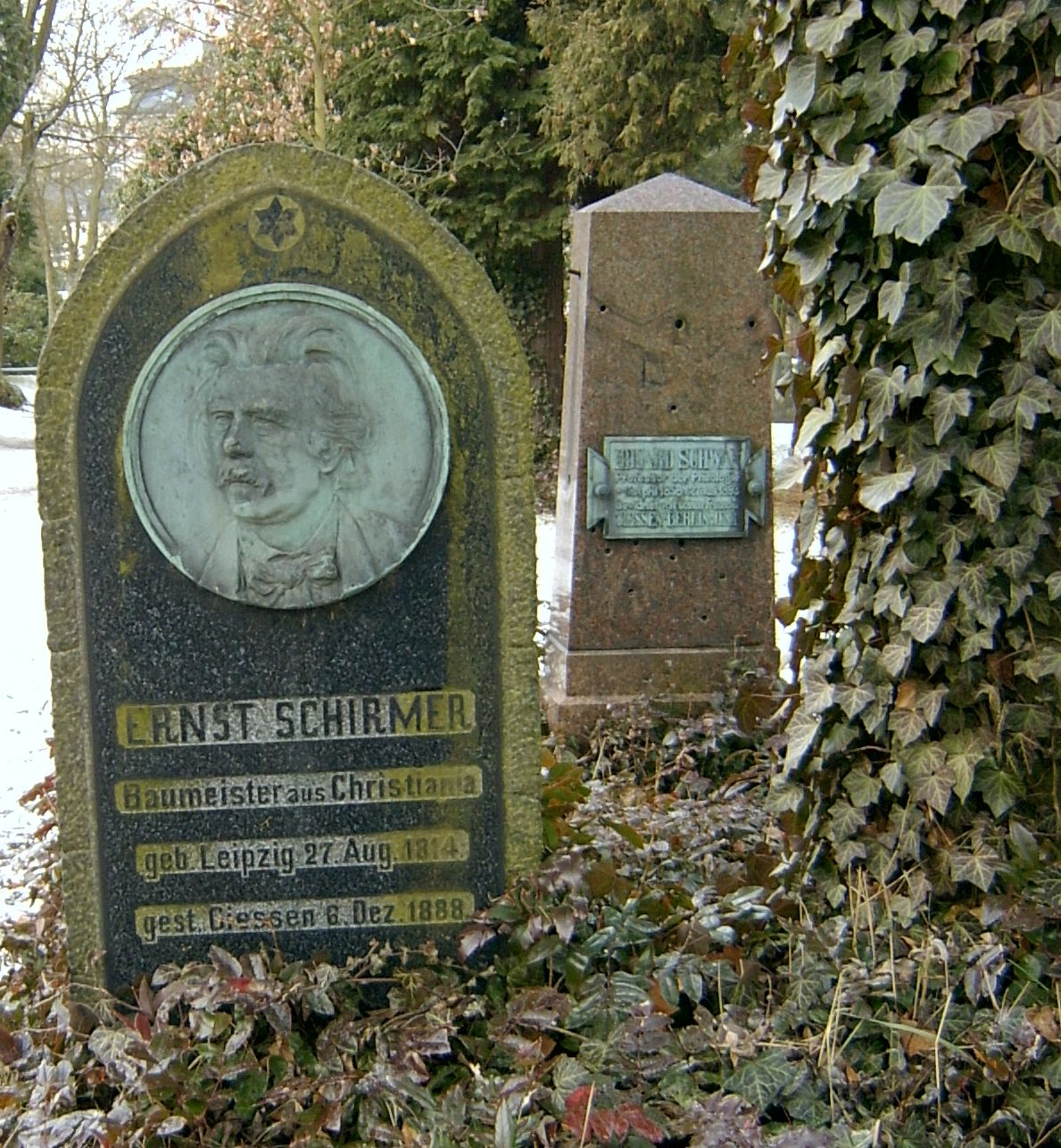
Grave in Gießen, Germany

Heinrich Ernst Schirmer (27 August 1814 – 6 December 1887) was a German-born architect most noted for his work in Norway. Schirmer worked in Norway from 1838 to 1883 and left his mark on a number of public buildings. He contributed significantly to the introduction of the so-called Swiss architectural style in Norway, based partly on Italian villa style, Gothic Revival, and neoclassicism.

== Biography ==
Schirmer was born in Leipzig, Germany. He was the son of Johan Gottlieb Schirmer and Johanne Sophie Kühne. He was the father of architect Adolf Schirmer. He received his architectural education at art academies in Dresden from 1831 to 1834, and in Munich from 1834 to 1837. In Munich he was influenced by German neoclassicist architect Leo von Klenze and his nation-building and urban design ideas.

Schirmer was construction manager for the rebuilding of the Oslo Cathedral between 1849 and 1850. In 1853 he entered into a partnership with fellow German-born architect Wilhelm von Hanno. Their partnership lasted until 1864. Among their works were Gaustad Hospital, Tangen Church (1854), Vestre Aker Church (1853–1855) and Østre Aker Church (1857–1860). Schirmer and Hanno designed all stations on Norway's first railway line, the Hoved Line between Christiania and Eidsvoll, finished in 1854. His partnership with Hanno ended in 1864.

Among Schirmer's later works are the designs of Øksendal Church (1864), Ørsta Church (1864), Fiskum Church (1866, burned 1902), Hareid Church (1877) and Vartdal Church (1877).

Schirmer's first large commission was the restoration of the Nidaros Cathedral, which was then in ruins. He started his preliminary investigations in 1841, finished the drawings in 1845, and the reconstruction work started in 1869. Schirmer's last major works in Norway were the creation of the hospitals Rikshospitalet, built between 1874 and 1883, and Ullevål Hospital from 1887.

== Personal life ==
Schirmer was appointed a knight of the Royal Norwegian Order of St. Olav in 1860.

Schirmer married Sophie Ottilia Major (1821–1861). They were the parents of architects Adolf Schirmer (1850–1930) and Herman Major Schirmer (1845–1913).

== Gallery ==
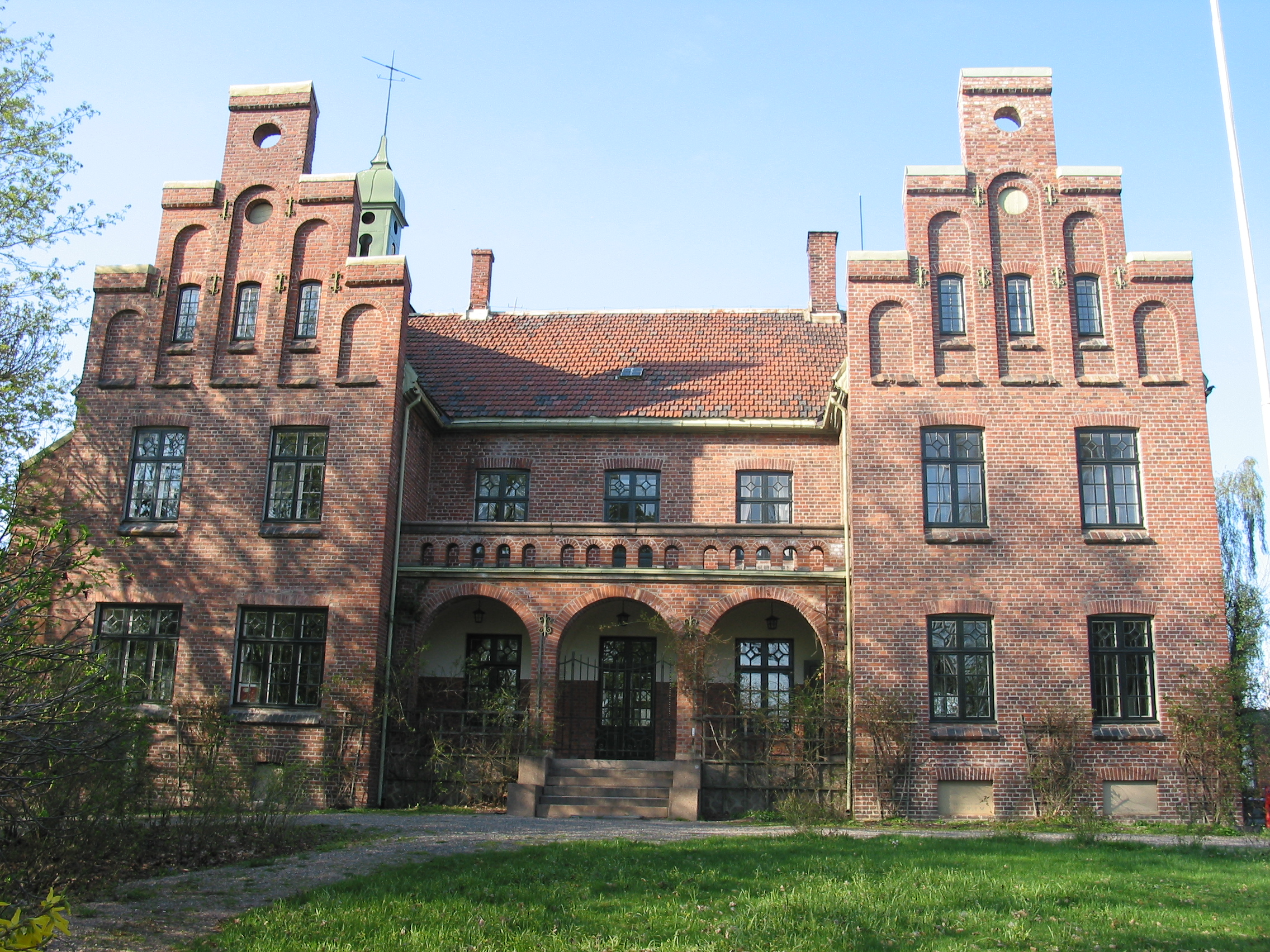
Slottet at Ringstabekk in Bærum Municipality (1851)

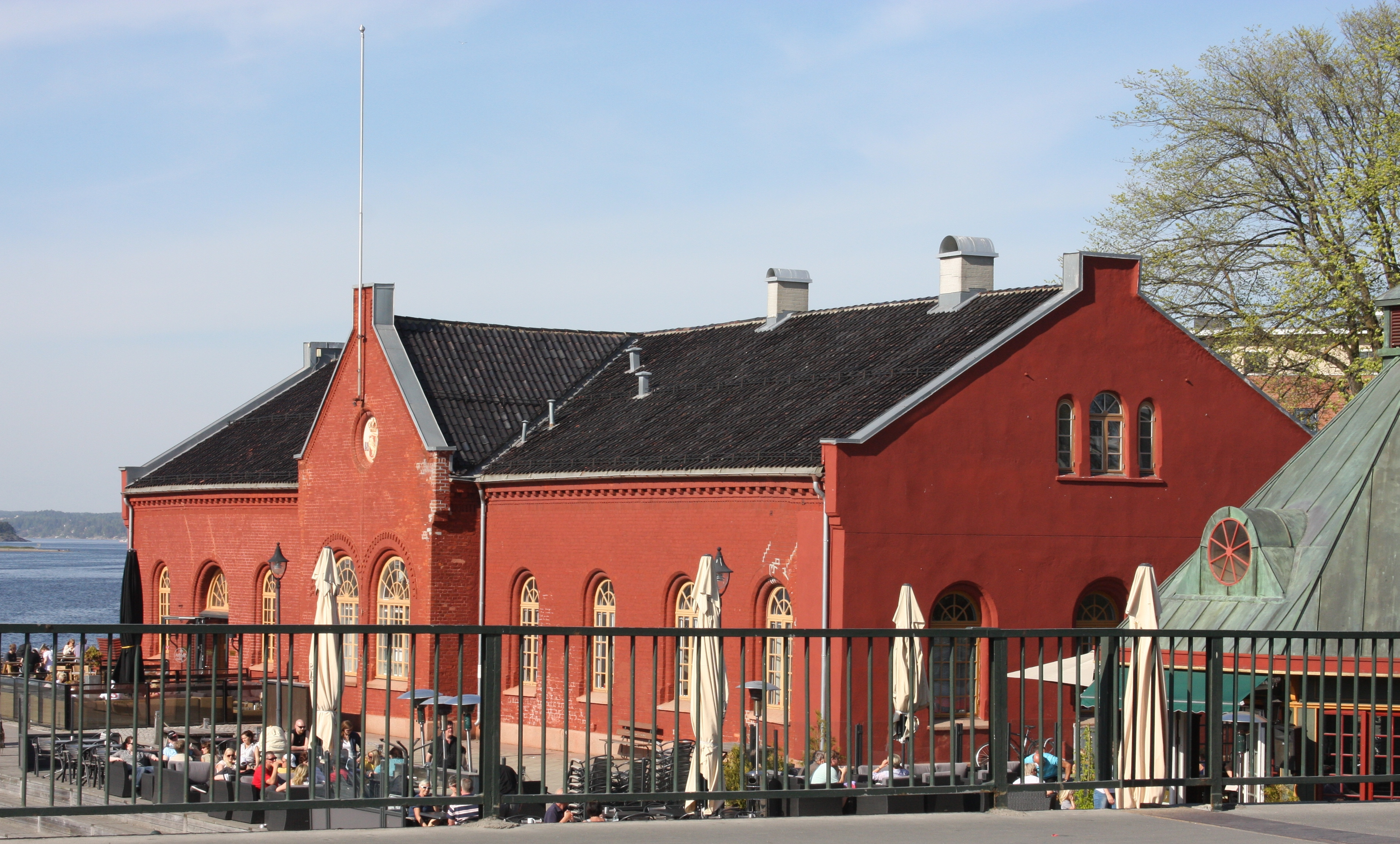
Cultural Heritage Building at Moss (1859)

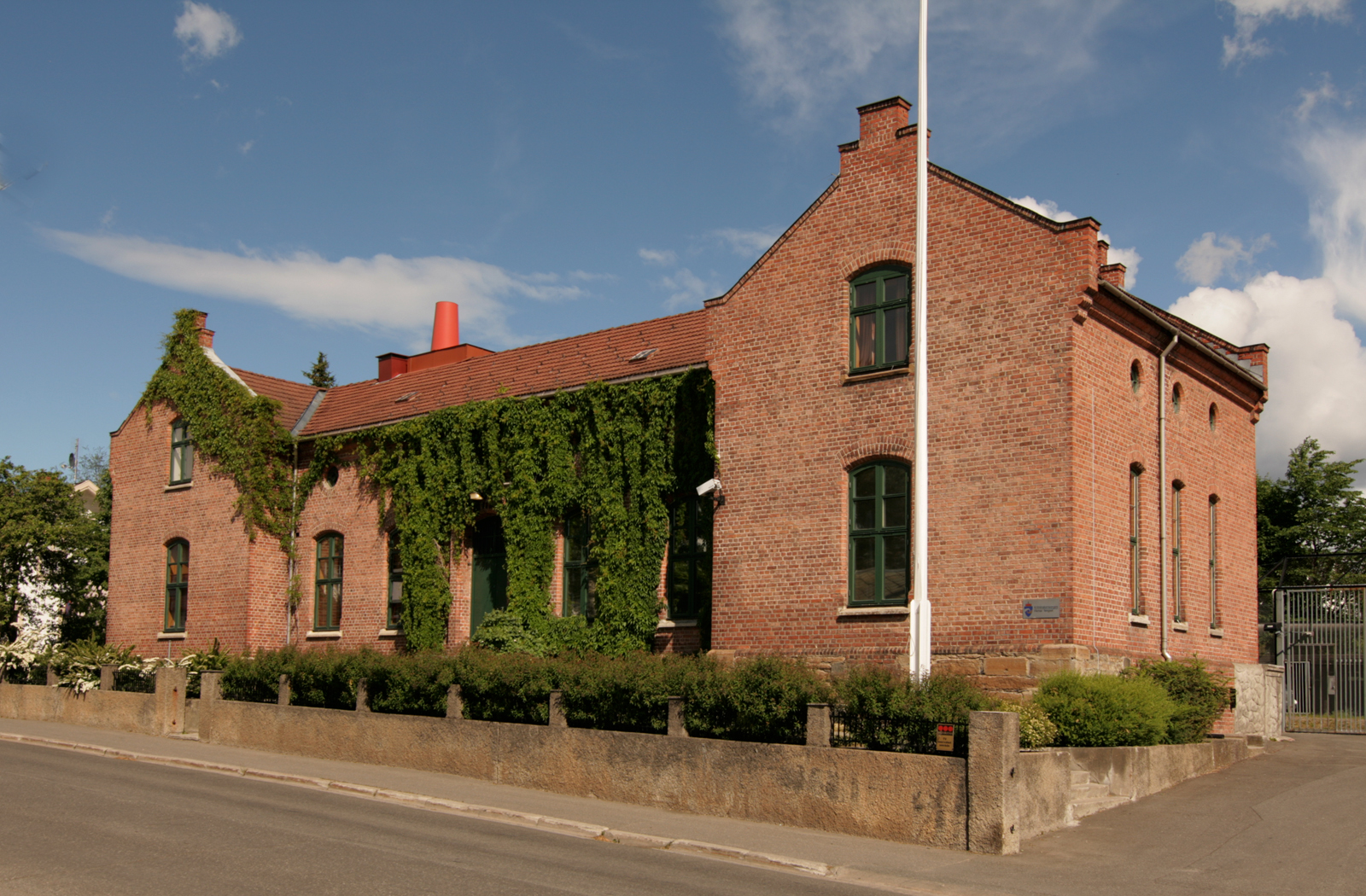
Hamar Prison at Hamar in Hedmark (1864)

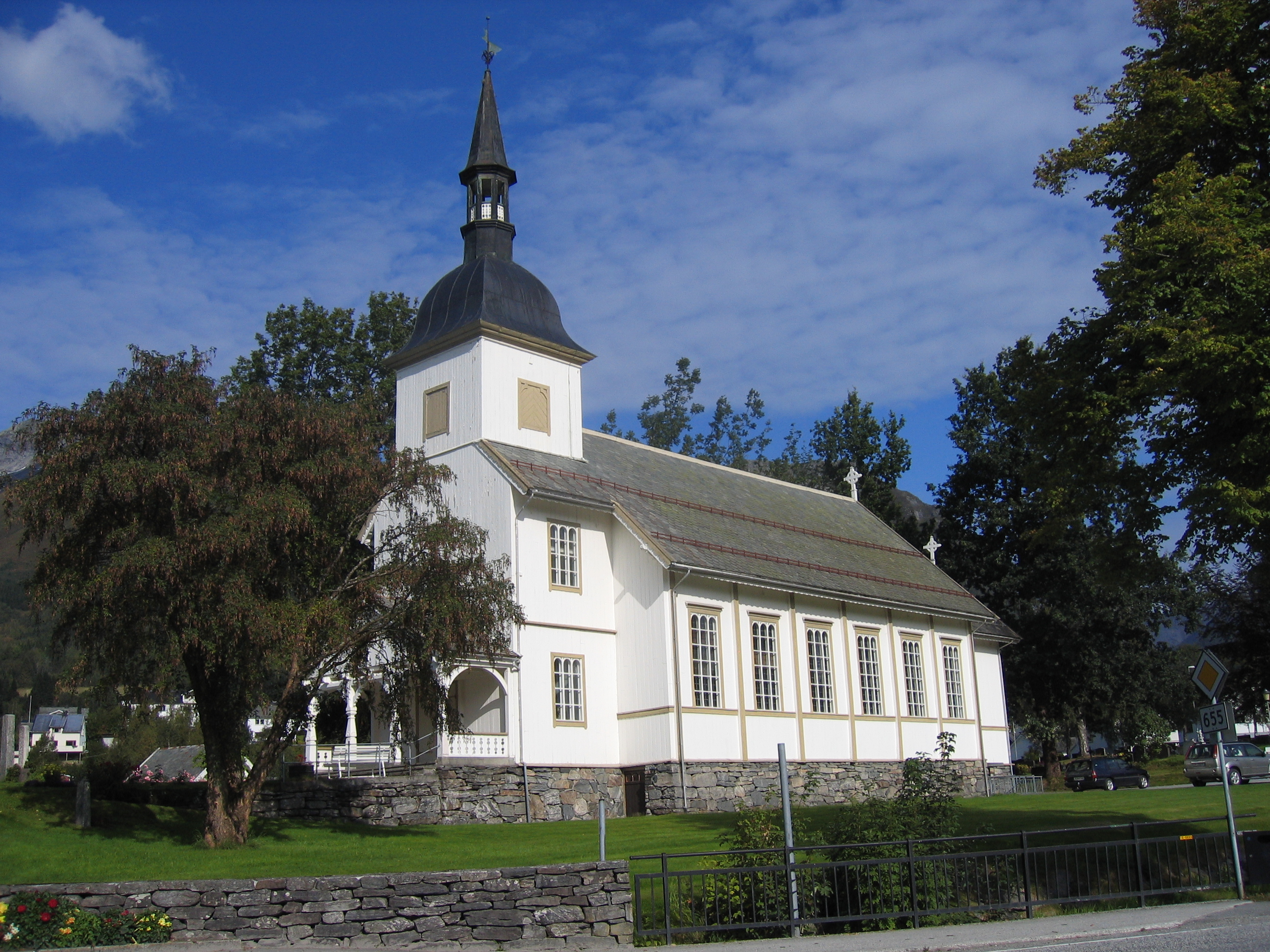
Ørsta Church in Ørsta in Møre og Romsdal (1864)

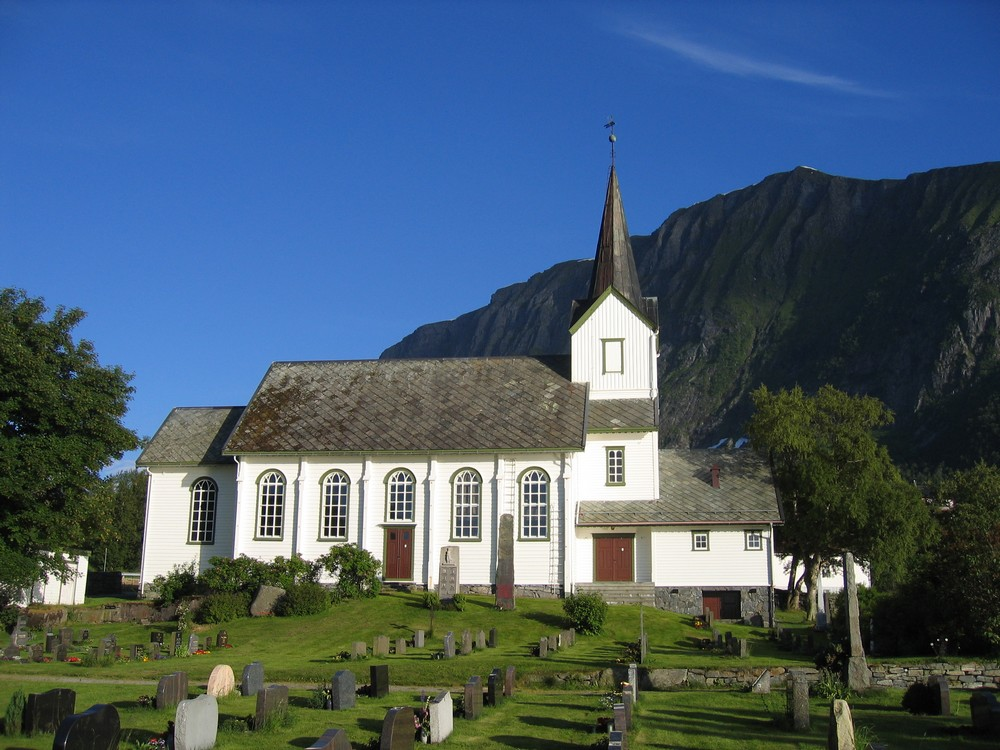
Vartdal Church at Nordre Vartdal in Møre og Romsdal (1876)
