= Fiskum Church =

Church in Buskerud, Norway

- Fiskum kirke
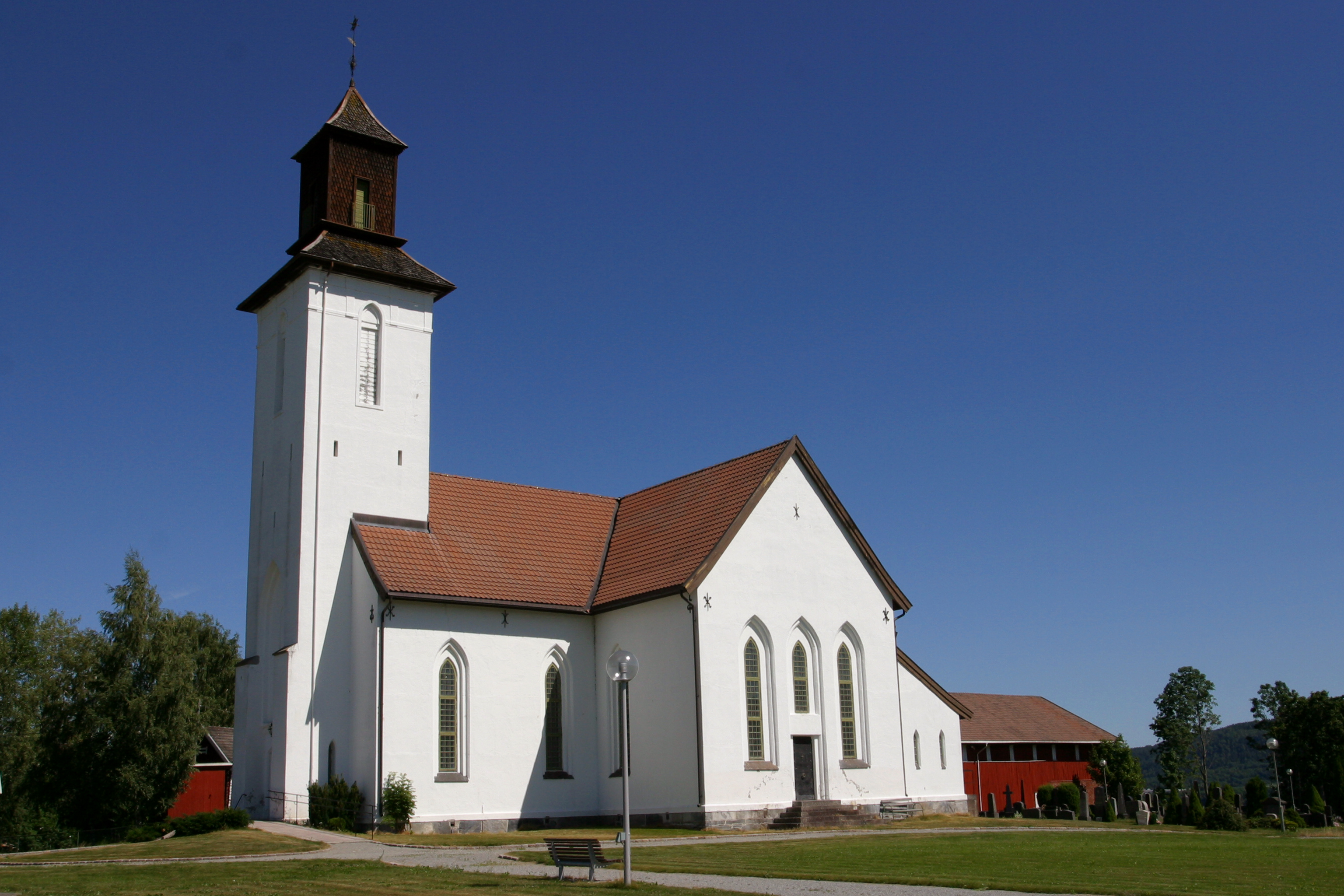
- View of the church
- Fiskum Church
- 59°42′10″N 9°48′22″E
- Location: Øvre Eiker, Buskerud
- Country: Norway
- Denomination: Church of Norway
- Churchmanship: Evangelical Lutheran

History
- Status: Parish church
- Founded: 1866
- Consecrated: 25 April 1866

Architecture
- Functional status: Active
- Architect(s): Adolf Schirmer and Wilhelm von Hanno
- Architectural type: Cruciform
- Completed: 1866 (160 years ago)

Specifications
- Capacity: 320
- Materials: Stone

Administration
- Diocese: Tunsberg
- Deanery: Eiker prosti
- Parish: Fiskum
- Norwegian Cultural Heritage Site
- Type: Church
- Status: Not protected
- ID: 176619

Fiskum Church (Norwegian: Fiskum kirke) is a parish church of the Church of Norway in Øvre Eiker Municipality in Buskerud county, Norway. It is located in the village of Darbu. It is one of the churches for the Fiskum parish which is part of the Eiker prosti (deanery) in the Diocese of Tunsberg. The white, stone church was built in a cruciform design in 1866 using plans drawn up by the architects Adolf Schirmer and Wilhelm von Hanno. The church seats about 320 people.

== History ==
The Old Fiskum Church was in use for centuries until Øvre Eiker Municipality took over ownership in 1856. The following year there were plans from Wilhelm Hanstein to renovate and enlarge the old church. These plans were rejected, however, and it was decided to build a new church instead. Land about 500 metres (1,600 ft) to the northwest was purchased and a new building was designed by the architects Adolf Schirmer and Wilhelm von Hanno. Construction took place from 1864 to 1866 and was led by master builder Christoffersen from Christiania and carpenter Becker from Kongsberg. The new church was consecrated on 25 April 1866. On 12 January 1902, the church burned down. Afterwards, upon inspection, the walls were considered to still be usable so the church was rebuilt in 1903, reusing the walls of the old church. Jørgen Berner designed the new brick building and he based his work on Schirmer & von Hanno's original drawings. The church was re-consecrated on 8 April 1903. On the night of 1 January 1940, the church burned down again. The subsequent reconstruction was led by Arnstein Arneberg. The church as we see it now was built during World War II, but it was not consecrated until after the war ended. It is supposedly the first Norwegian church to be consecrated after the war, but sources disagree about the date. Some sources say 22 May 1945, 1 June 1945, and 31 May 1945.

== Media gallery ==
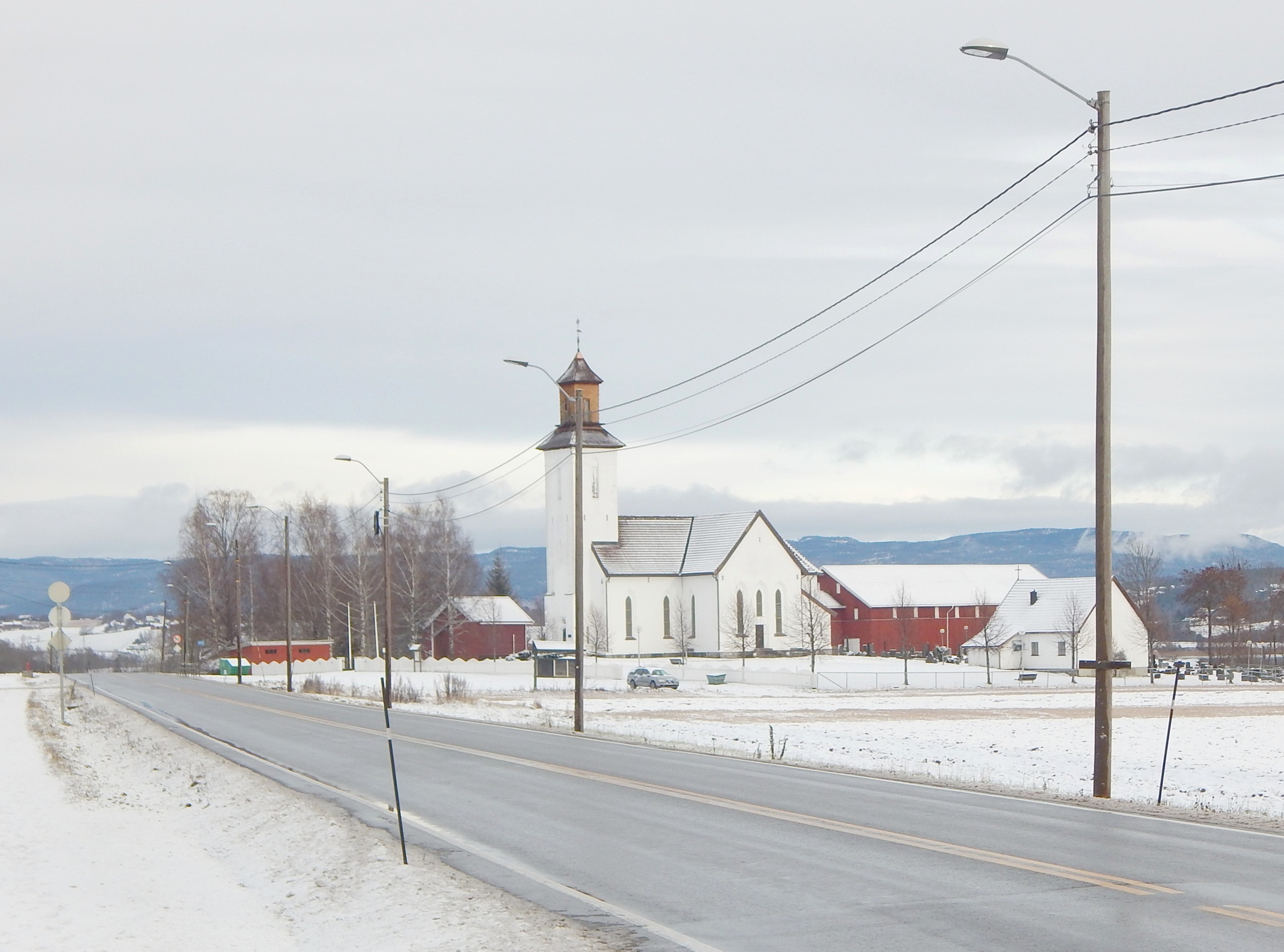
Present building (since 1940)

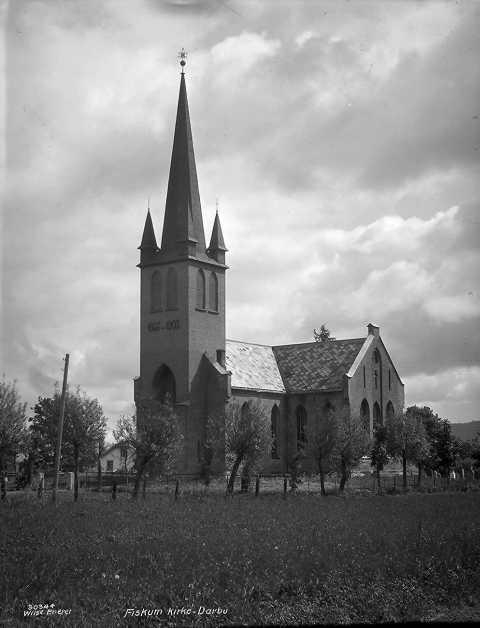
Second building (1903–1940)

First building (1866–1903)

== See also ==
- List of churches in Tunsberg
