= Old Fiskum Church =

Church in Buskerud, Norway

- Fiskum gamle kirke
- View of the church
- Old Fiskum Church
- 59°41′56″N 9°48′36″E
- Location: Øvre Eiker, Buskerud
- Country: Norway
- Denomination: Church of Norway
- Previous denomination: Catholic Church
- Churchmanship: Evangelical Lutheran

History
- Status: Parish church
- Founded: c. 1250
- Consecrated: c. 1250

Architecture
- Functional status: Active
- Architectural type: Long church
- Completed: c. 1250 (776 years ago)

Specifications
- Capacity: 150
- Materials: Stone

Administration
- Diocese: Tunsberg
- Deanery: Eiker prosti
- Parish: Fiskum
- Norwegian Cultural Heritage Site
- Type: Church
- Status: Automatically protected
- ID: 84141

Old Fiskum Church (Norwegian: Fiskum gamle kirke) is a parish church of the Church of Norway in Øvre Eiker Municipality in Buskerud county, Norway. It is located in the village of Darbu. It is one of the churches for the Fiskum parish which is part of the Eiker prosti (deanery) in the Diocese of Tunsberg. The white, wooden church was built in a long church design around the year 1250. The church seats about 150 people.

The film I Am Dina was partly filmed at the church.

== History ==
The earliest existing historical records of the church date back to the year 1400, but the church was not built that year. The church is believed to have been built around the middle of the 13th century, probably as a private church for Fiskum farm. It was dedicated to St. Olav. After the Reformation it was an annex to Haug Church (the main church for the Eiker parish). The church has stone walls, but the gables are made out of tarred wood. The nave is rectangular and the choir is also rectangular, but it is narrower and has a lower roof line than the nave.

The church, like most other churches in Norway, was sold into private ownership during the Norwegian church sale in 1723 to help the King pay off war debts. It had a number of owners before the municipality took over in 1856. By then the church was far too small for the congregation. Plans for enlarging the church were drawn up by Wilhelm Hanstein were presented to the parish in 1857, but they were rejected. Instead, it was decided to build a new church. The parish selected a site at the Nordre Darbu farm, about 500 metres (1,600 ft) to the northwest of the old church site. The new Fiskum Church was completed in 1866. At the time, the intention was to demolish the old medieval church, but the parish priest, H. Kiær, led a local public campaign to preserve it as a museum. Money was raised, and the old church was purchased in 1876. It is now owned and operated by a separate foundation. The church is still used for church services on special occasions (such as on Constitution Day and Olsok) as well as for concerts and weddings. The Society for the Preservation of Ancient Norwegian Monuments helped restore the building from 1966 to 1973.

== Media gallery ==
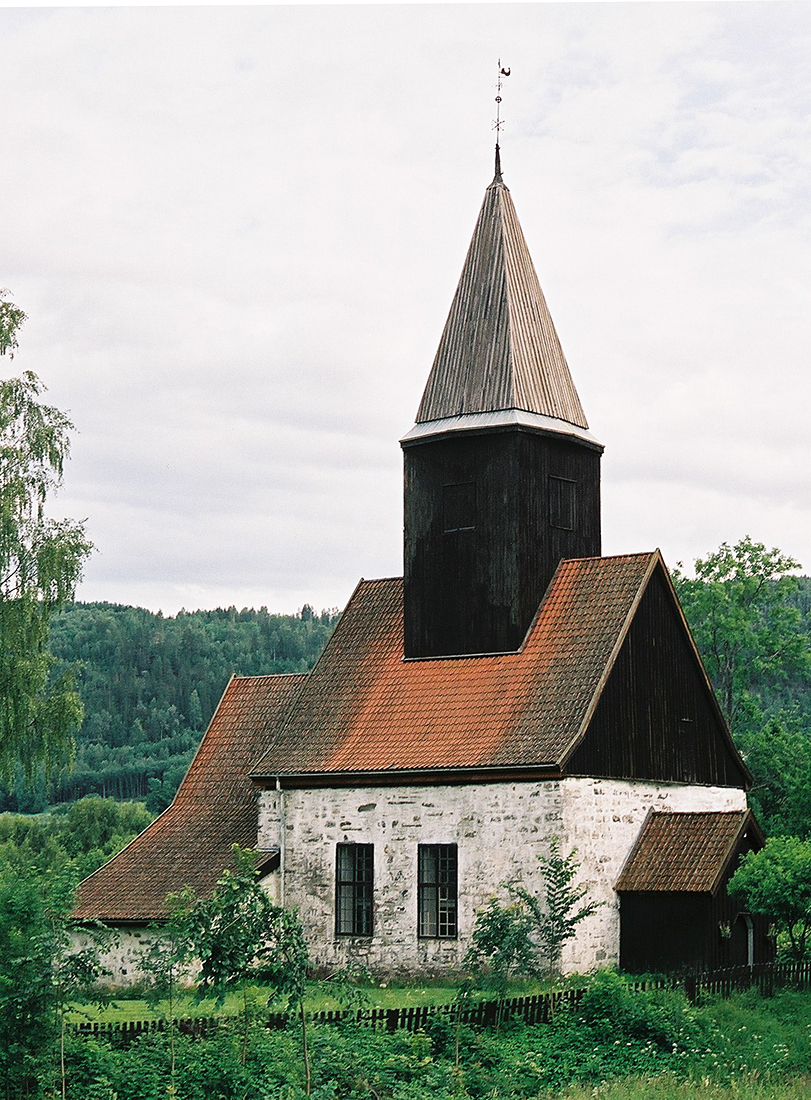

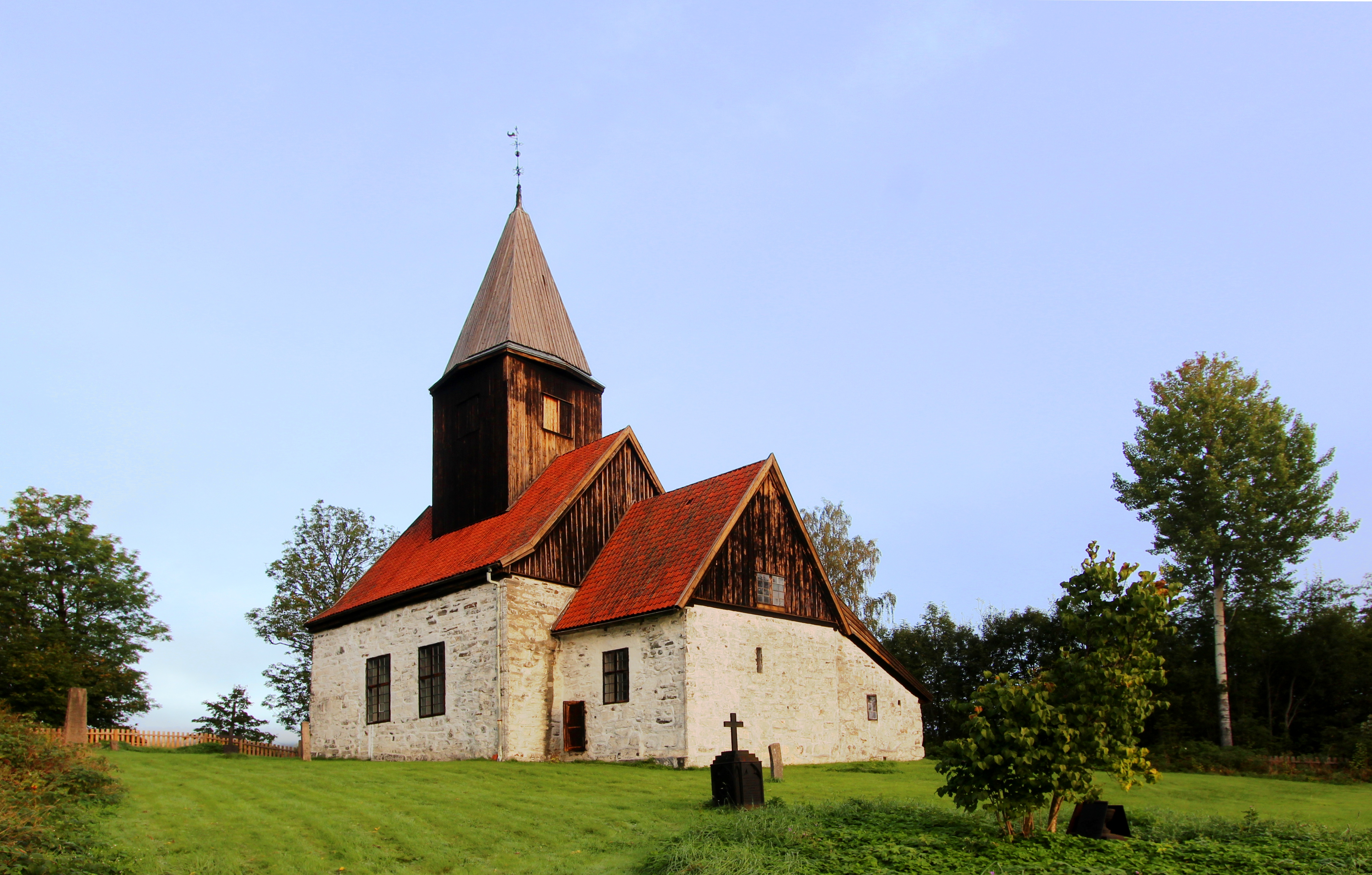

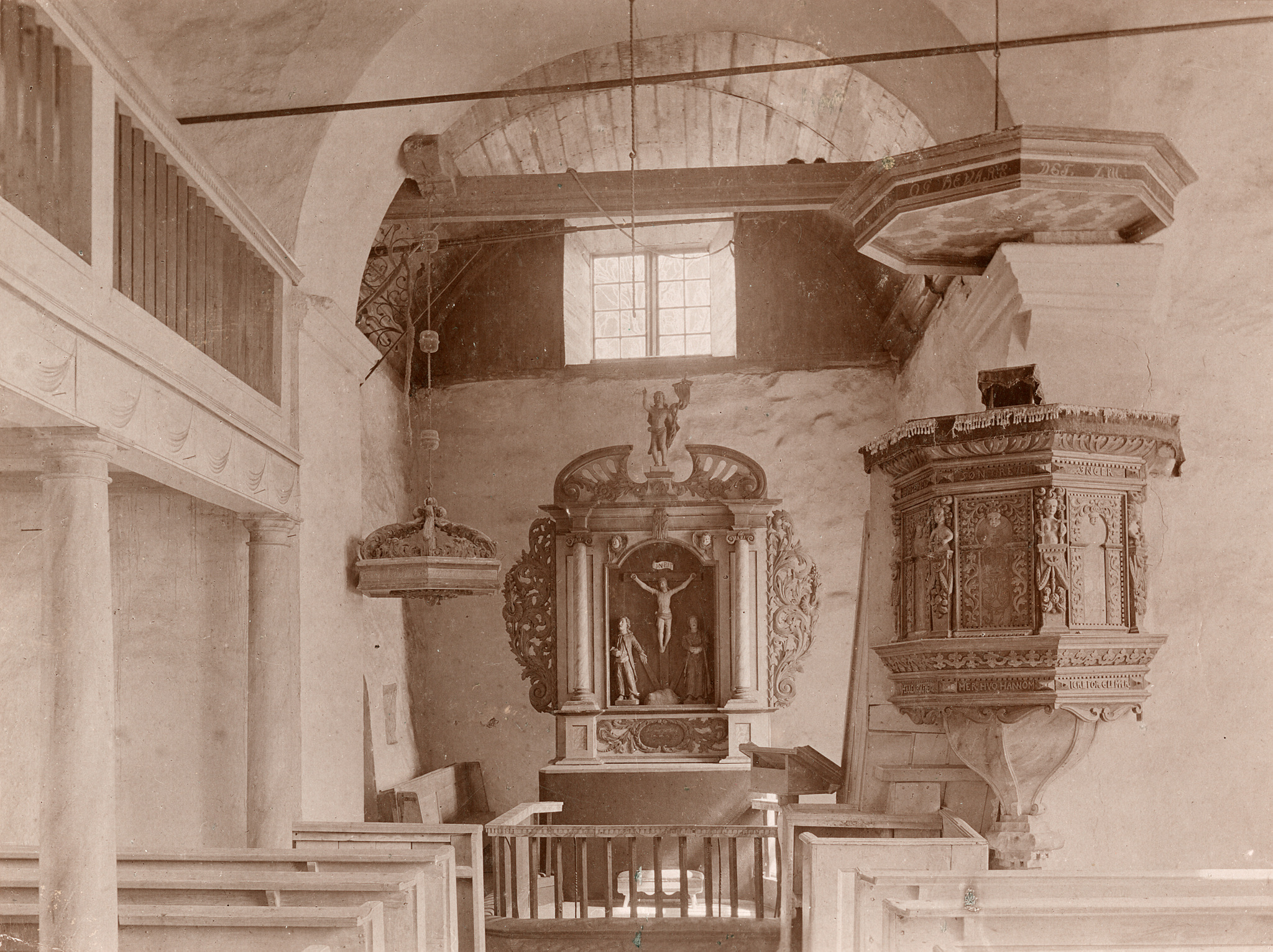

== See also ==
- List of churches in Tunsberg
