= Øksendal Church =

Church in Møre og Romsdal, Norway

- Øksendal kyrkje
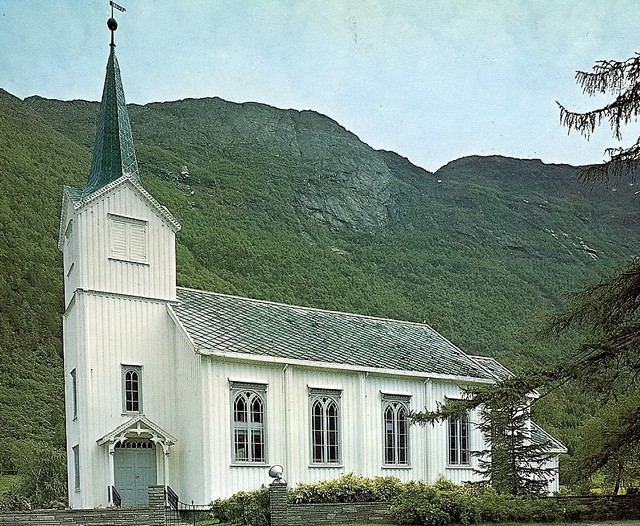
- View of the church
- Øksendal Church
- 62°42′59″N 8°25′52″E
- Location: Sunndal Municipality, Møre og Romsdal
- Country: Norway
- Denomination: Church of Norway
- Churchmanship: Evangelical Lutheran

History
- Status: Parish church
- Founded: 13th century
- Consecrated: 13 July 1894

Architecture
- Functional status: Active
- Architect: Adolf Schirmer
- Architectural type: Long church
- Style: Neo-Gothic
- Completed: 1894 (132 years ago)

Specifications
- Capacity: 260
- Materials: Wood

Administration
- Diocese: Møre bispedømme
- Deanery: Indre Nordmøre prosti
- Parish: Øksendal
- Norwegian Cultural Heritage Site
- Type: Church
- Status: Listed
- ID: 85899

Øksendal Church (Norwegian: Øksendal kirke) is a parish church of the Church of Norway in Sunndal Municipality in Møre og Romsdal county, Norway. It is located in the village of Øksendalsøra. It is the church for the Øksendal parish which is part of the Indre Nordmøre prosti (deanery) in the Diocese of Møre. The white, wooden church was built in a long church style with a neo-Gothic design in 1894 by the architect Adolf Schirmer. The church seats about 260 people.

== History ==
The earliest existing historical records of the church date back to 1309, but that was not the year the church was built. The original church was located at Husby, about 300 metres (980 ft) south of the present location of the church. It was likely built during the 13th century. The church was a stave church. At some point before the 1600s, the church was enlarged by adding stave transepts to the north and south to give the church a cruciform design. In 1655, the eastern cross-arm which held the chancel was torn down and rebuilt. The new chancel was re-built using the more modern timber-framed construction while the rest of the building was still the old stave church construction from the 13th century. At the end of the 1660s, the old corridors that ran around the church were removed. In 1711, the church was described as being in very poor condition with many sections of wood that were rotting. In 1712, the medieval church was torn down and a new building was constructed on the same site. The new building was a timber-framed cruciform design with a church porch and sacristy. Some of the materials from the old church were reused in the new building.

By the late-1800s, the church was again in very poor condition and it was decided to tear down the building and construct a new church. This time, however, it was decided to move the church 300 metres (980 ft) to the north, a little closer to the village of Øksendalsøra. The new church was built in 1894 using designs by Adolf Schirmer and the lead builder was Ole Eriksen Schei. The church was a neo-Gothic long church. The new church was built in a north–south orientation (most old Norwegian churches are in an east–west orientation). The new church was consecrated on 13 July 1894.

== Media gallery ==
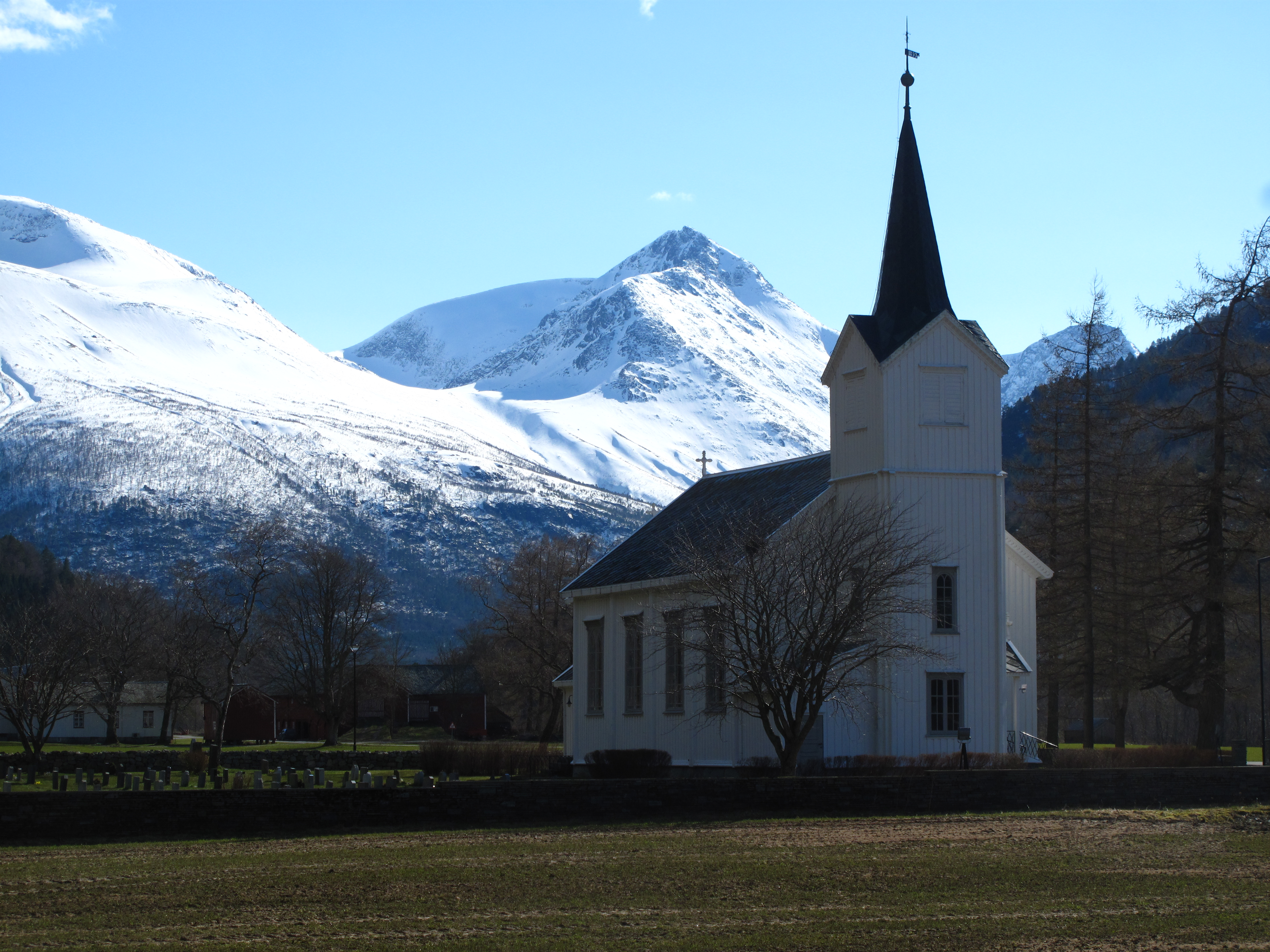

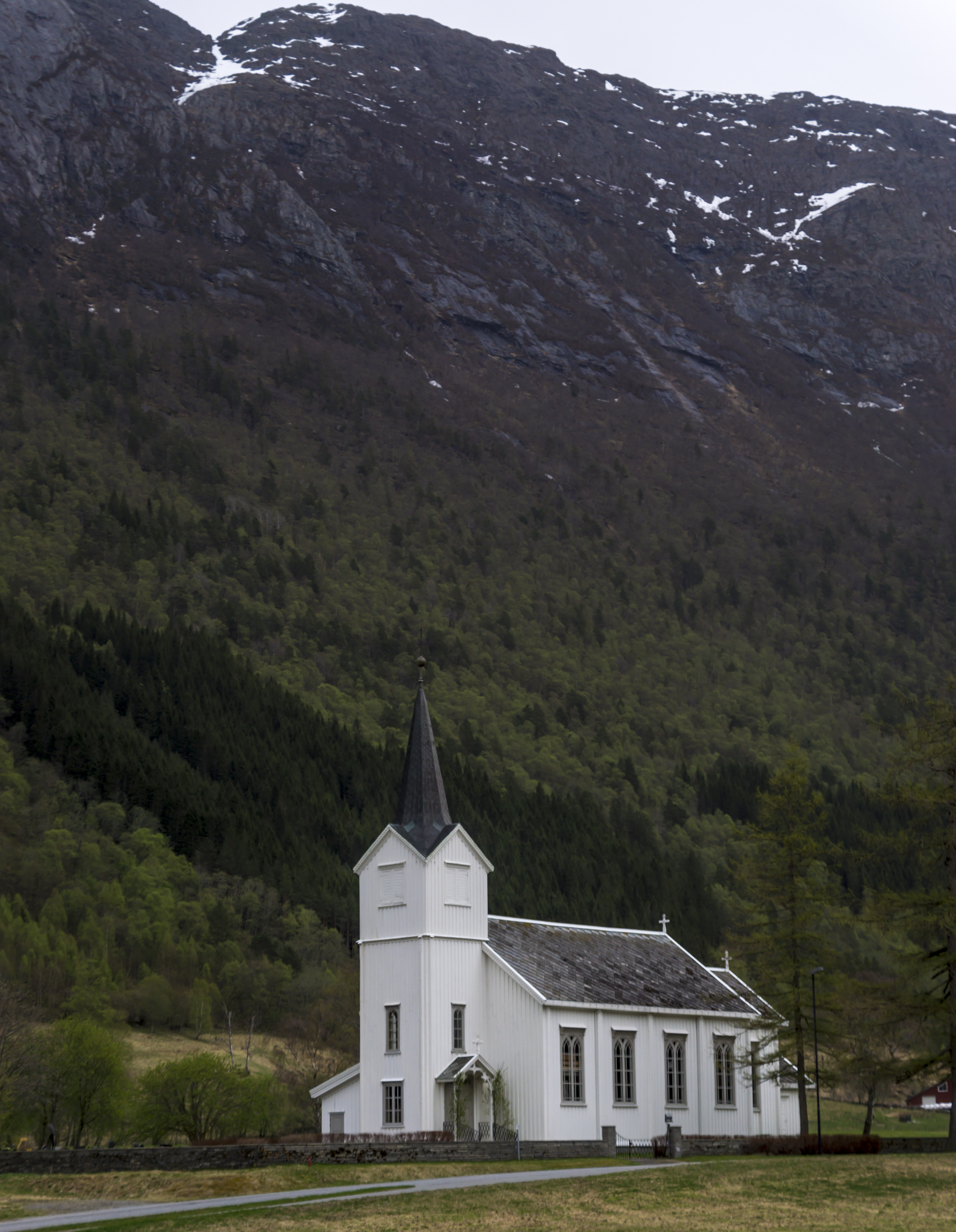

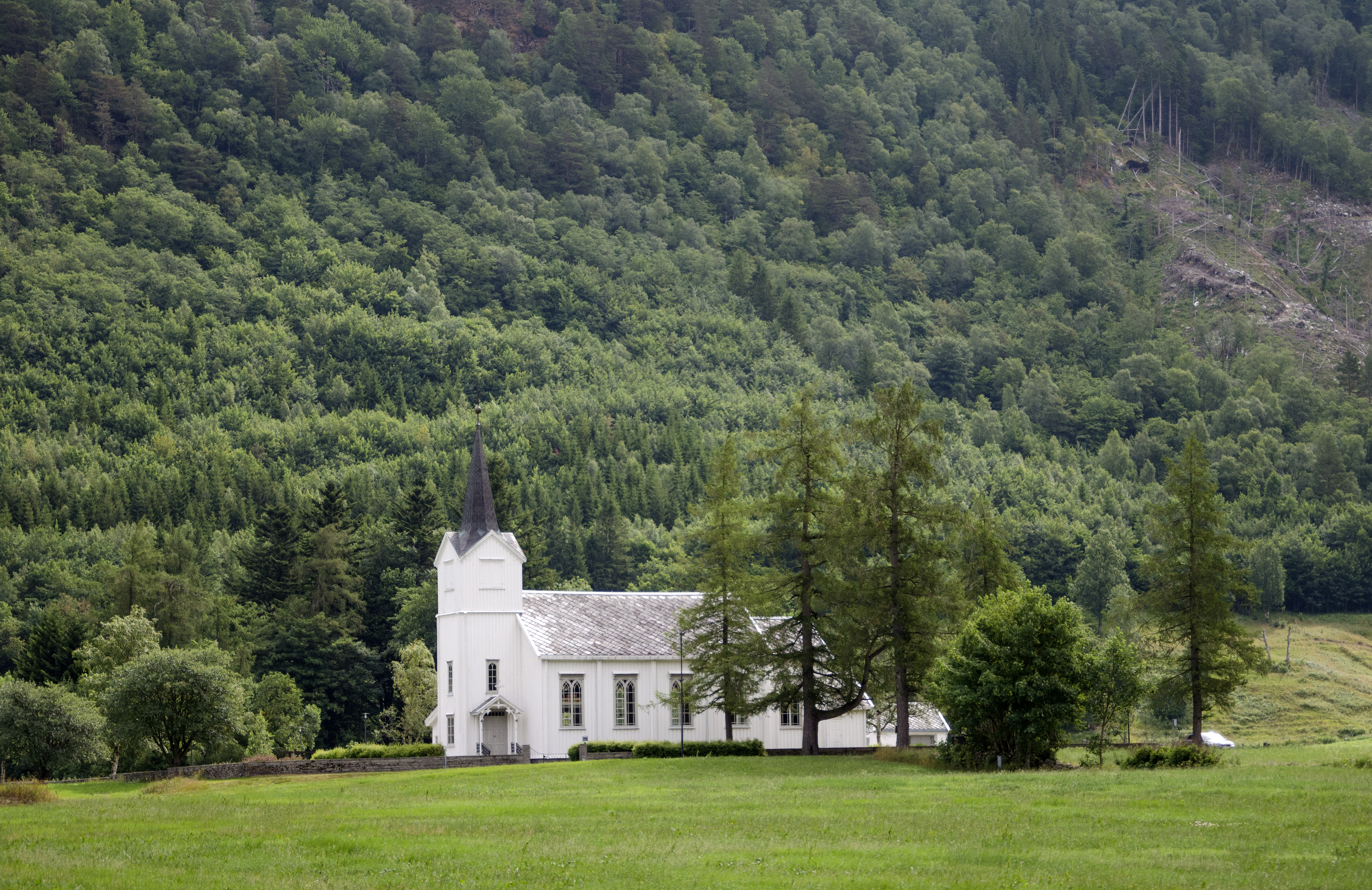

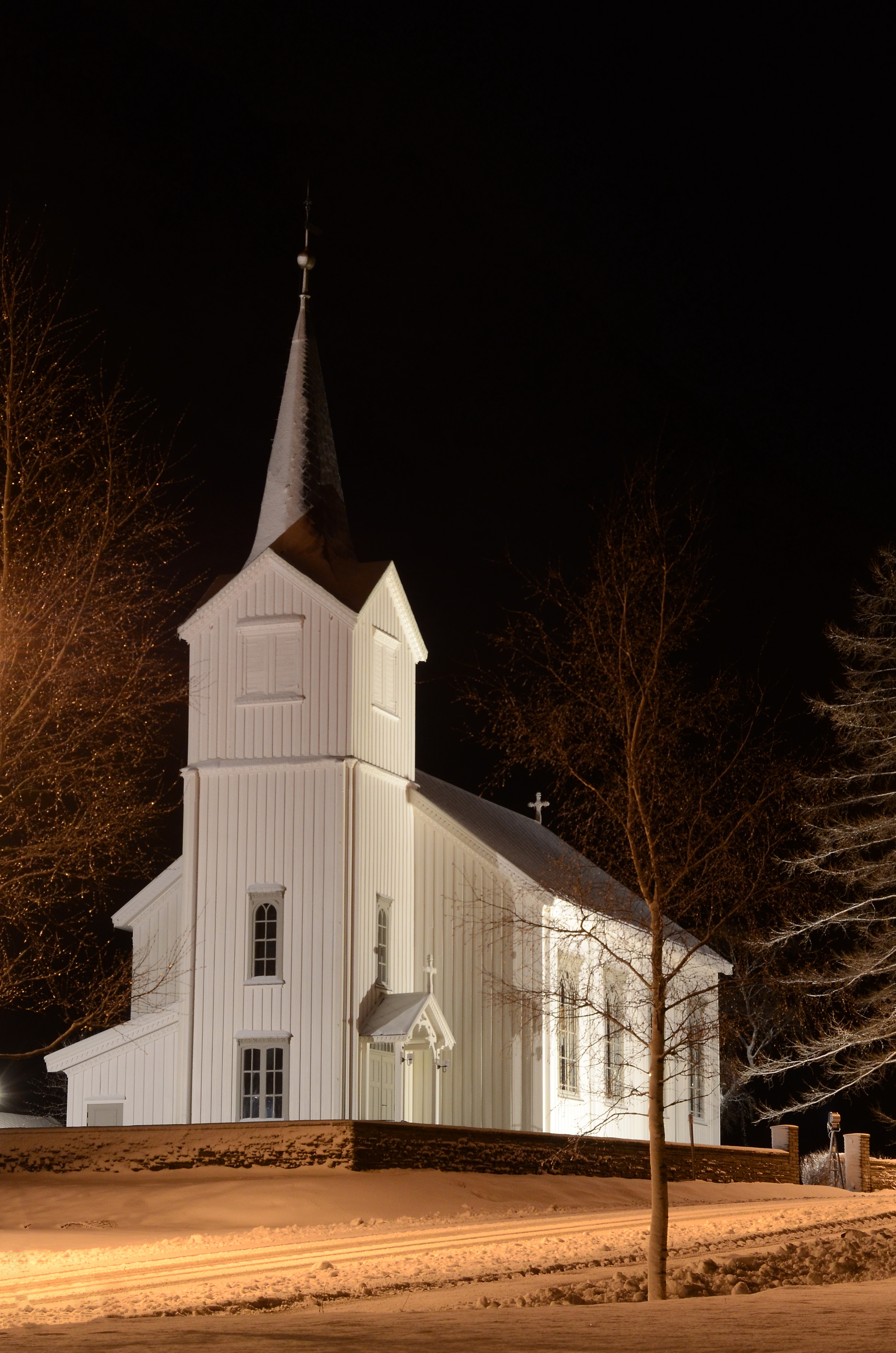

== See also ==
- List of churches in Møre
