= Ørsta Church =

Church in Møre og Romsdal, Norway

- Ørsta kyrkje
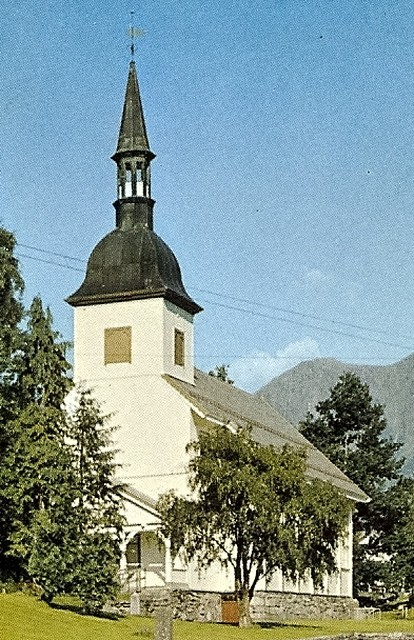
- View of the church
- Ørsta Church
- 62.20019969847°N 6.1306232213°E
- Location: Ørsta, Møre og Romsdal
- Country: Norway
- Denomination: Church of Norway
- Churchmanship: Evangelical Lutheran

History
- Status: Parish church
- Founded: 12th century
- Consecrated: 4 December 1864

Architecture
- Functional status: Active
- Architect(s): Heinrich Ernst Schirmer and Wilhelm von Hanno
- Architectural type: Long church
- Completed: 1864 (162 years ago)

Specifications
- Capacity: 350
- Materials: Wood

Administration
- Diocese: Møre bispedømme
- Deanery: Søre Sunnmøre prosti
- Parish: Ørsta
- Norwegian Cultural Heritage Site
- Type: Church
- Status: Listed
- ID: 85910

Ørsta Church (Norwegian: Ørsta kyrkje) is a parish church of the Church of Norway in Ørsta Municipality in Møre og Romsdal county, Norway. It is located in the village of Ørsta. It is the church for the Ørsta parish which is part of the Søre Sunnmøre prosti (deanery) in the Diocese of Møre. The white, wooden church was built in a long church design in 1864 using plans drawn up by the architects Heinrich Ernst Schirmer and Wilhelm von Hanno. The church seats about 350 people.

== History ==
The earliest existing historical records of the church date back to 1385, but the church wasn't new at that time. The first church was a wooden stave church that was likely built during the 12th century. The original church was located about 50 metres (160 ft) west of the present-day church site. The original floor plan was that it was a rectangular long church design with a narrower chancel, very similar to the Kvernes Stave Church. Probably during the 1500s or 1600s, the church was enlarged by building transepts to the north and south of the nave, creating a cruciform floor plan. The additions were all built using stave church construction. After this renovation, the church nave measured about 20 by 9 metres (66 ft × 30 ft) and the church porch on the west end measured 4.3 by 4.3 metres (14 ft × 14 ft). In 1665, the roof was severely damaged due to a lightning strike and a new roof was built. In 1699, the old, medieval church was renovated and refurbished.

By the 1860s, the old church was in poor condition and it was decided to build a new church and tear down the old church. In 1862, the parish hired the architects Heinrich Ernst Schirmer and Wilhelm von Hanno to design the new church and Jacob Ørstenvig was hired as the lead builder. In 1864, the old church was torn down and work began on a new church about 50 metres (160 ft) to the east of the old church site. Some of the building materials as well as some of the interior furnishings of the old church were reused in the new church. Some of the interior design elements were inspired by the historic Urnes Stave Church. The new building was consecrated on 4 December 1864. In 1953, the church porch was torn down and rebuilt. The porch originally had a stave church-inspired design with a triangular gable in the middle, but when it was rebuilt it was given a wide gable shape, much like a temple front. In 1967–1970, the ground underneath the church was excavated to create a basement space where a new church hall and other utility rooms were constructed.

== Media gallery ==
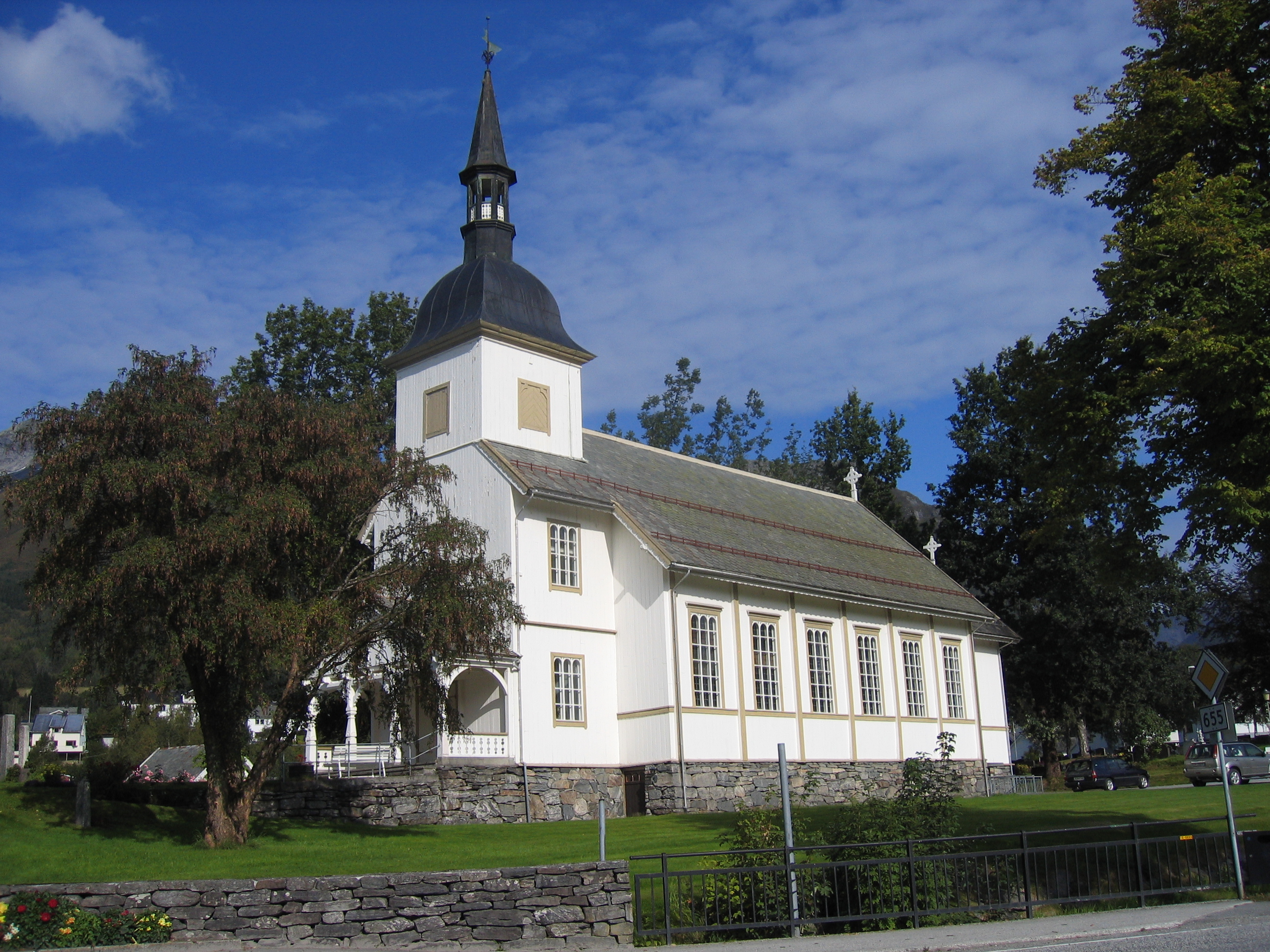

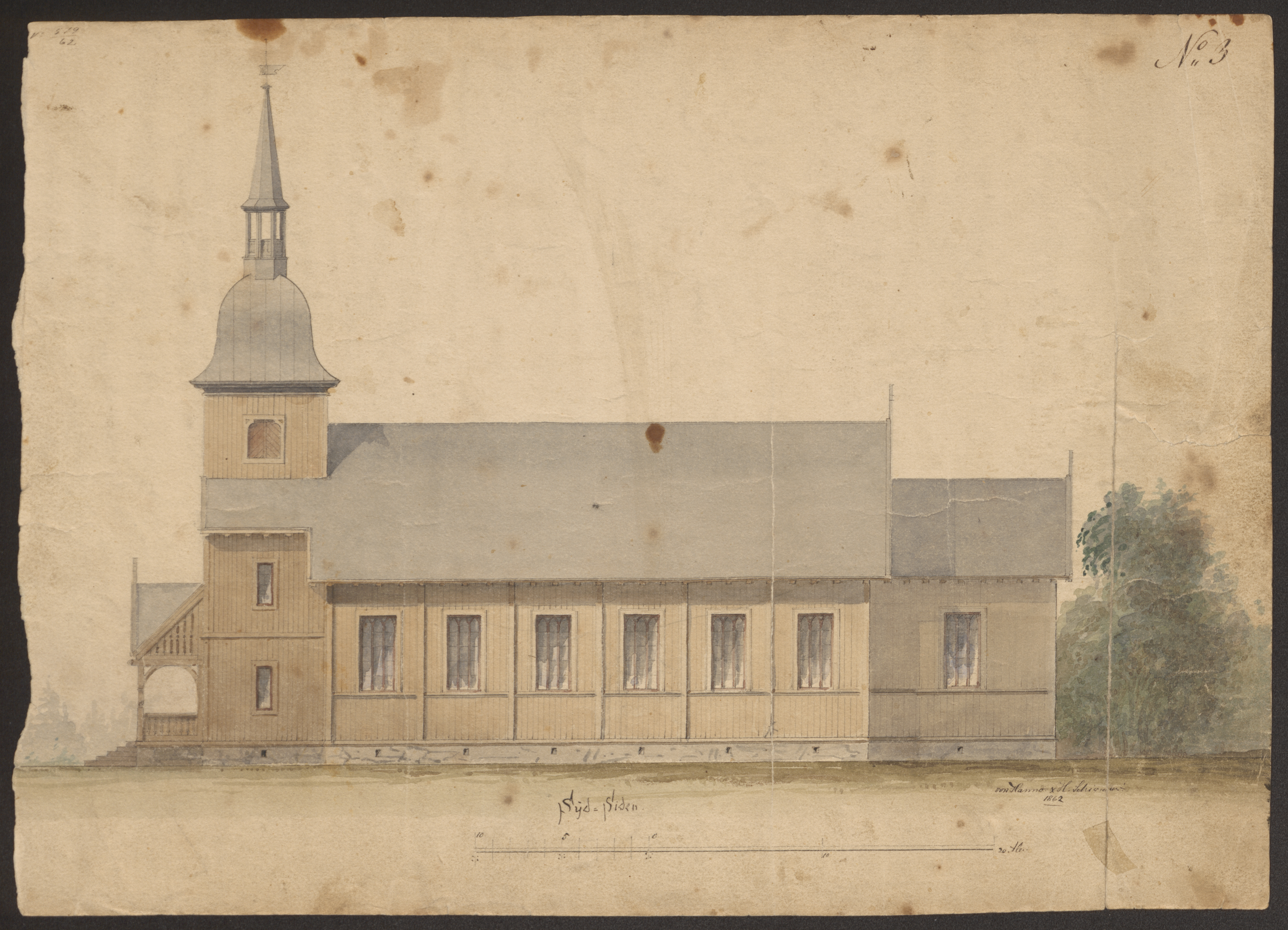

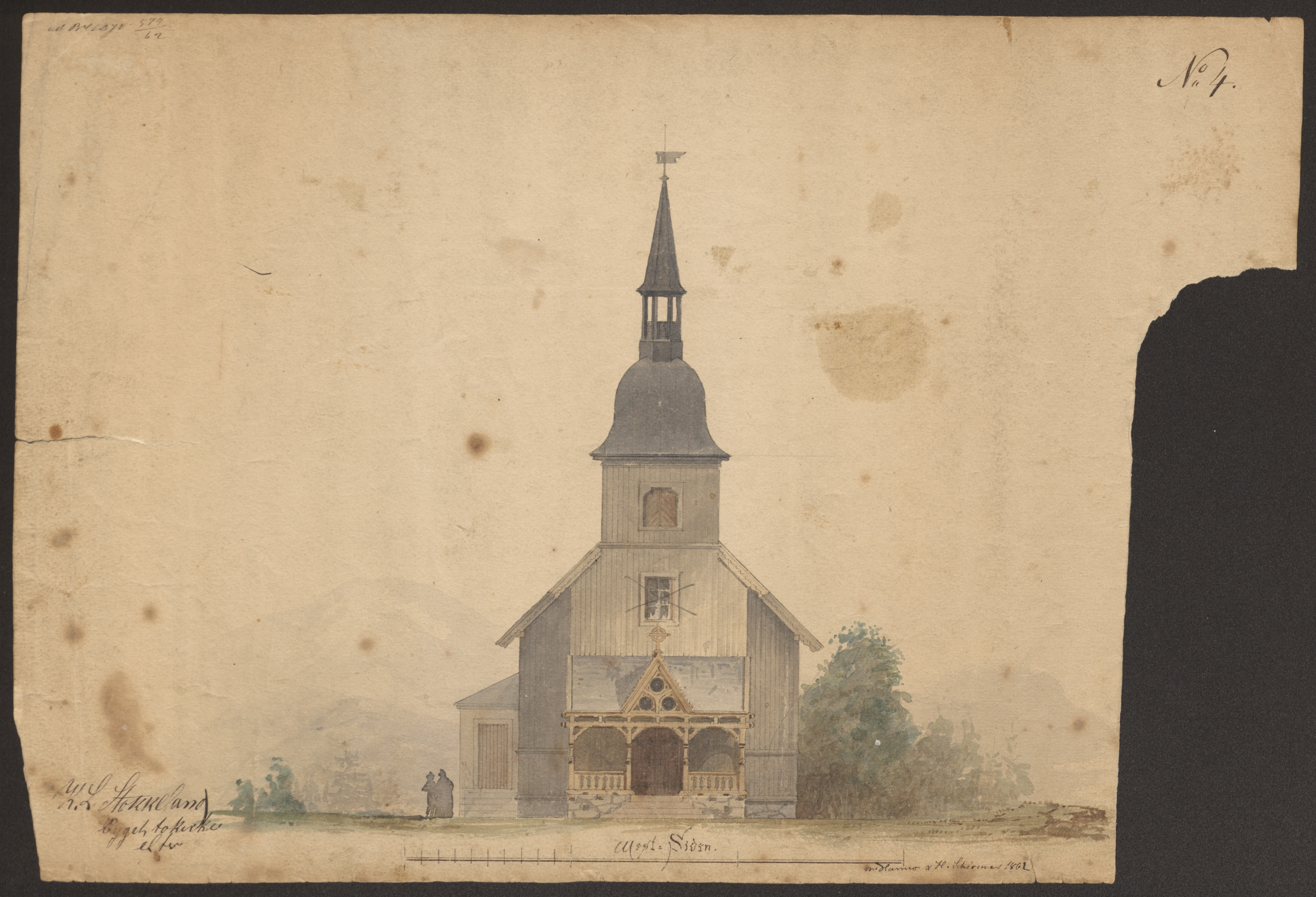

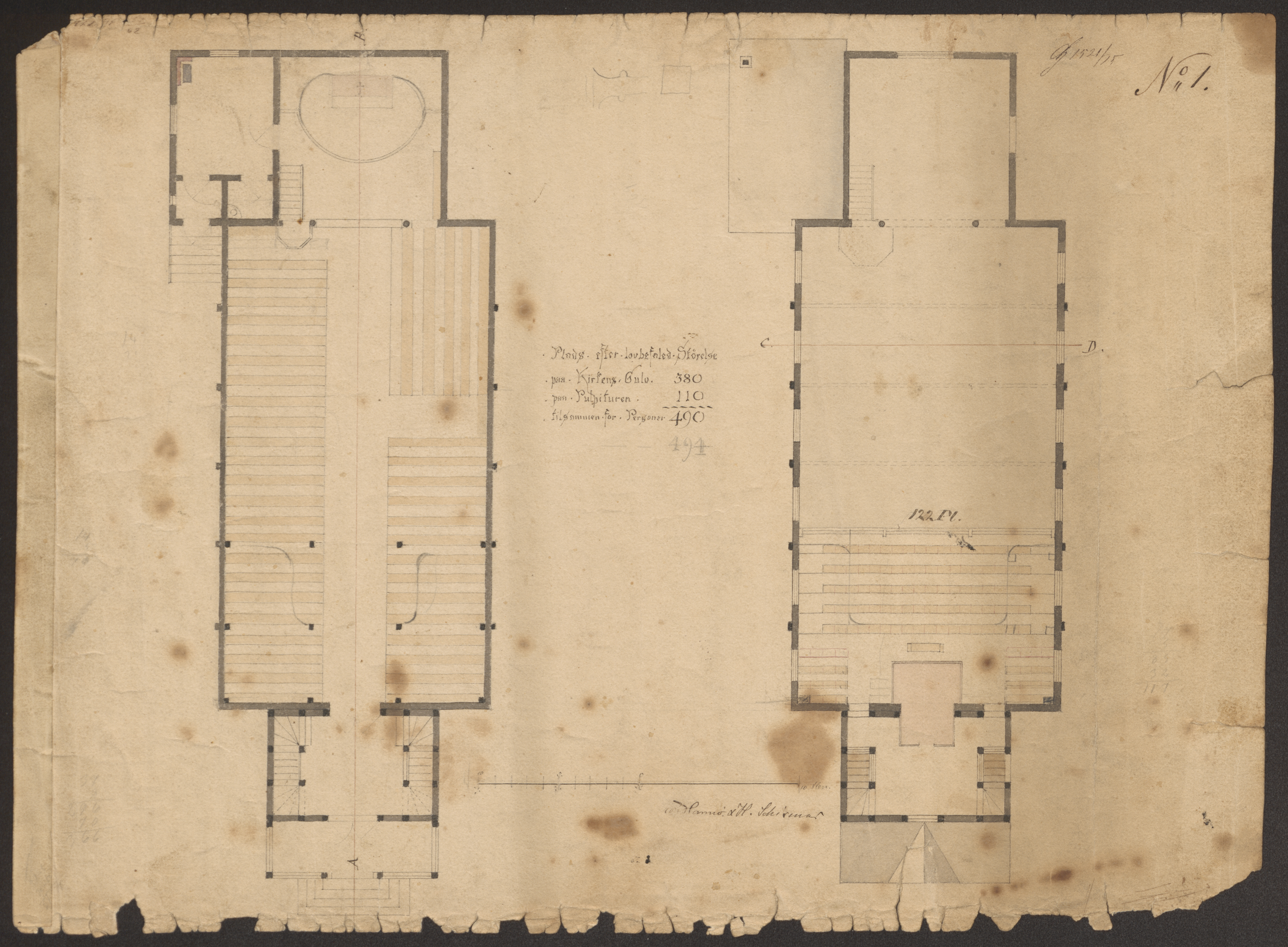

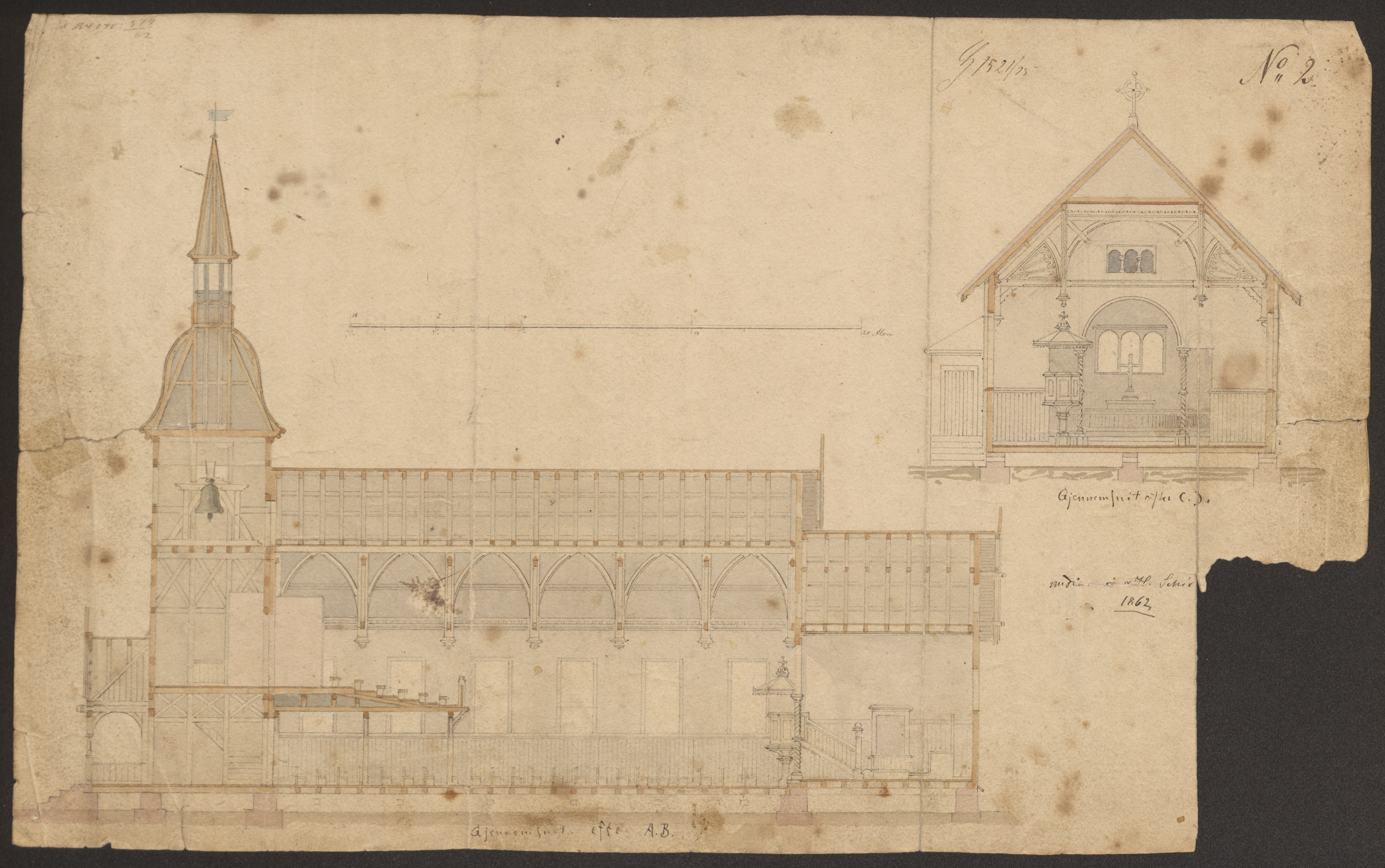

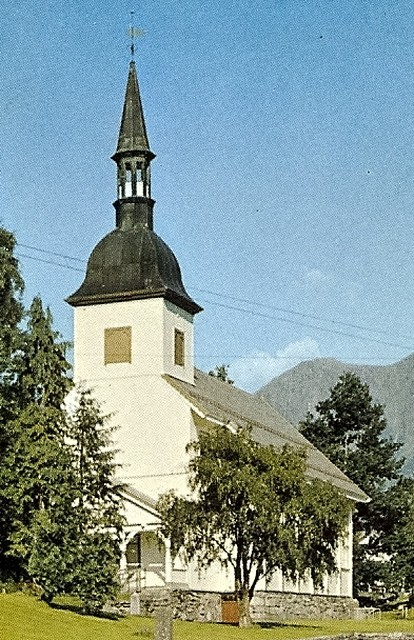

== See also ==
- List of churches in Møre
