= Adolf Schirmer =

Norwegian architect

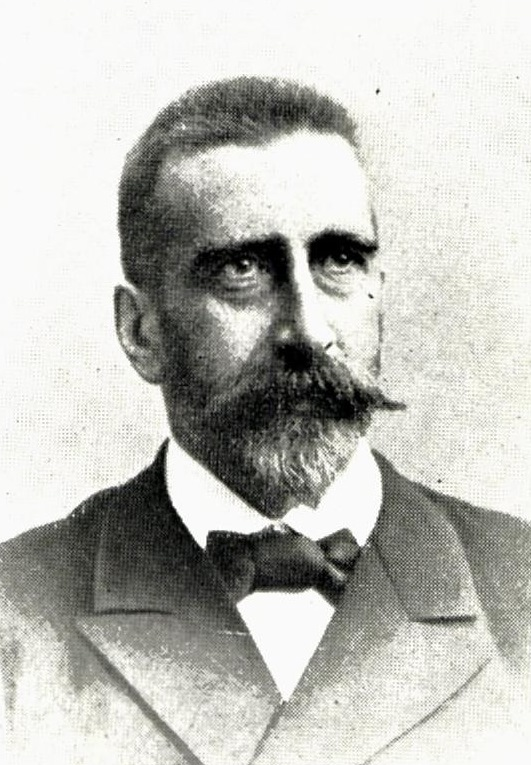
Adolf Schirmer

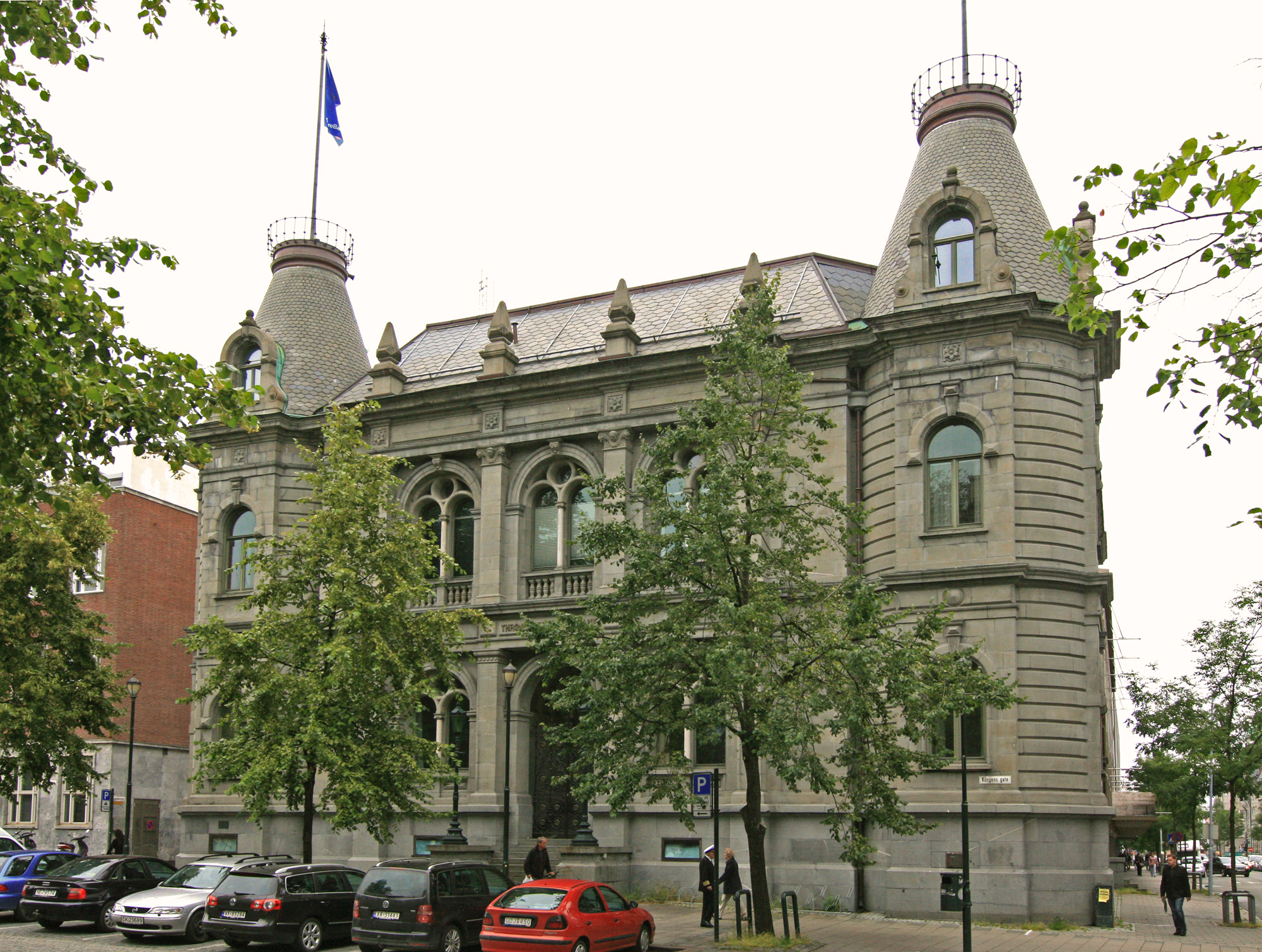
The head office of Sparebanken Midt-Norge was designed by Schirmer

Adolf Schirmer (1 October 1850 – 11 August 1930) was a Norwegian architect.

== Personal life ==
Adolf Schirmer was born in Christiania (now Oslo), Norway. He was the son of architect Heinrich Ernst Schirmer and Sophie Ottilia Major (1821–1861). He was a brother of Herman Major Schirmer and nephew of Herman Wedel Major. In November 1878 in Braunschweig he married Hildur Koch (1856–1914). He died in August 1930 in Bærum.

== Career ==
His initial training was with his father's practice and at the Royal School of Drawing under sculptor Julius Middelthun. He stayed a short period in Germany in 1870, before being employed by Georg Andreas Bull in Christiania from 1871 to 1872. He then took lessons at the Bauakademie in Berlin and École des Beaux-Arts in Paris, graduating in 1874.

Schirmer ran his own company in Christiania until 1886. In 1887, he was appointed the state's building inspector with responsibility for the state-owned properties. He has designed several public buildings, however for most major projects he was responsible for regulation and planning. Among Schirmer's most known work is the New Renaissance central section of the National Gallery, which was started by his father, but taken over by Adolf after his father had a disagreement with the owner. Other prominent works include the Trondhjems Sparebank building (1882), today the head office of Sparebanken Midt-Norge, Privatbanken i Trondhjem (1883), parts of Ullevål University Hospital (1886) and the Customs House (Tollboden) in Oslo (1896). One of his first known works was a stabbur built at Frognerseteren outside Oslo, and an early example of national romanticism.

Schirmer was also a judge in several architectural competitions and an active member of the Norwegian Engineer and Architect Association. He was appointed a Knight of the Order of the Dannebrog in 1888 and Knight of the Order of St. Olav in 1896.

== Gallery ==
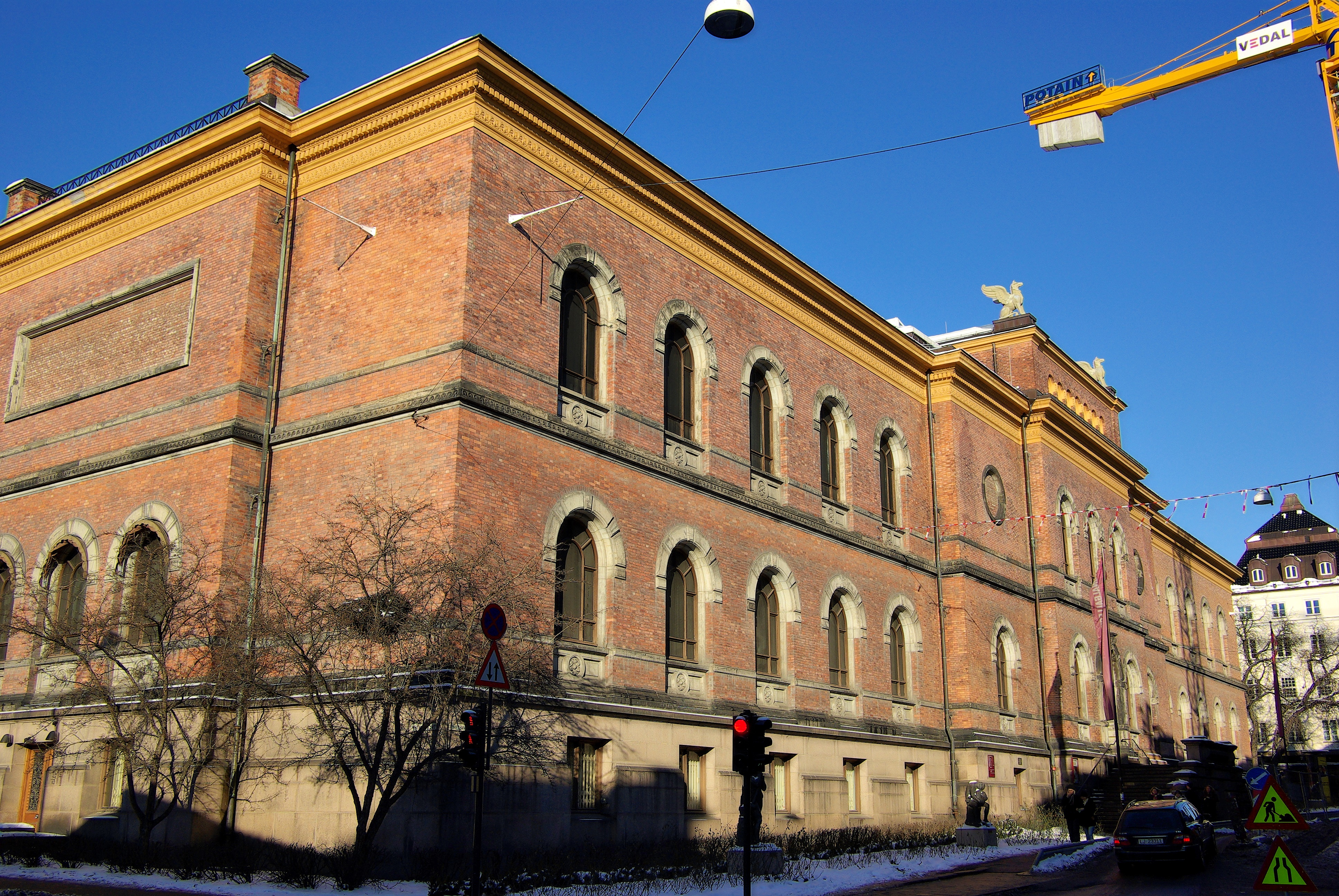
National Gallery in Oslo, with Heinrich Ernst Schirmer (1882)

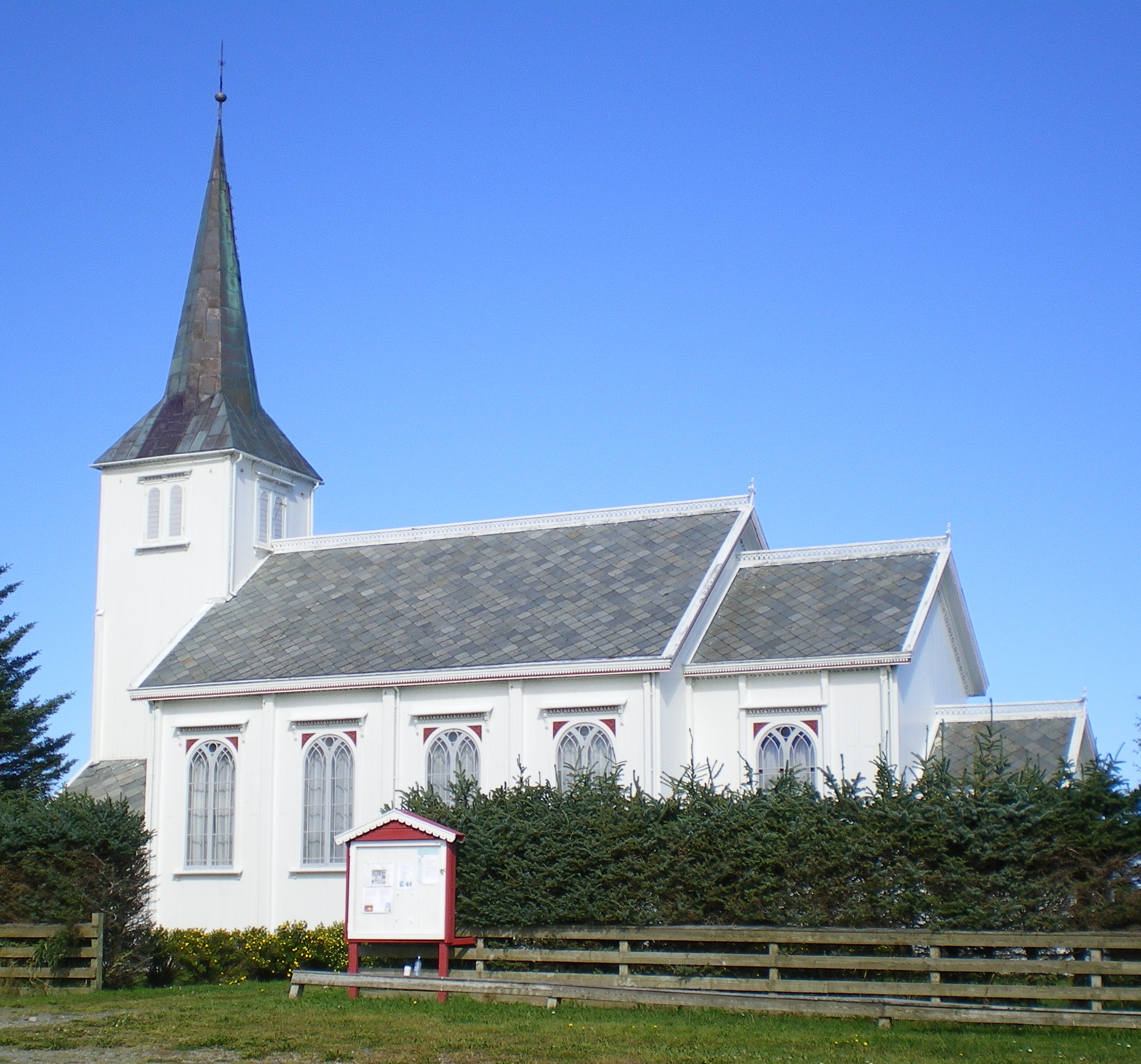
Hopen Church at Smøla in Møre og Romsdal (1892)

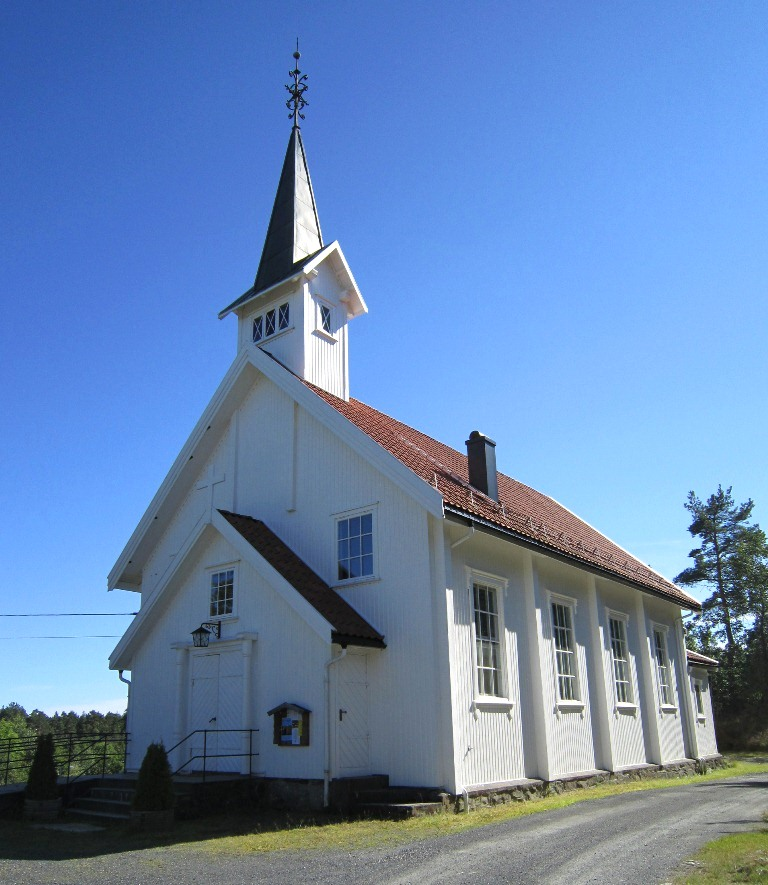
Støle Church at Kragerø in Telemark (1892)

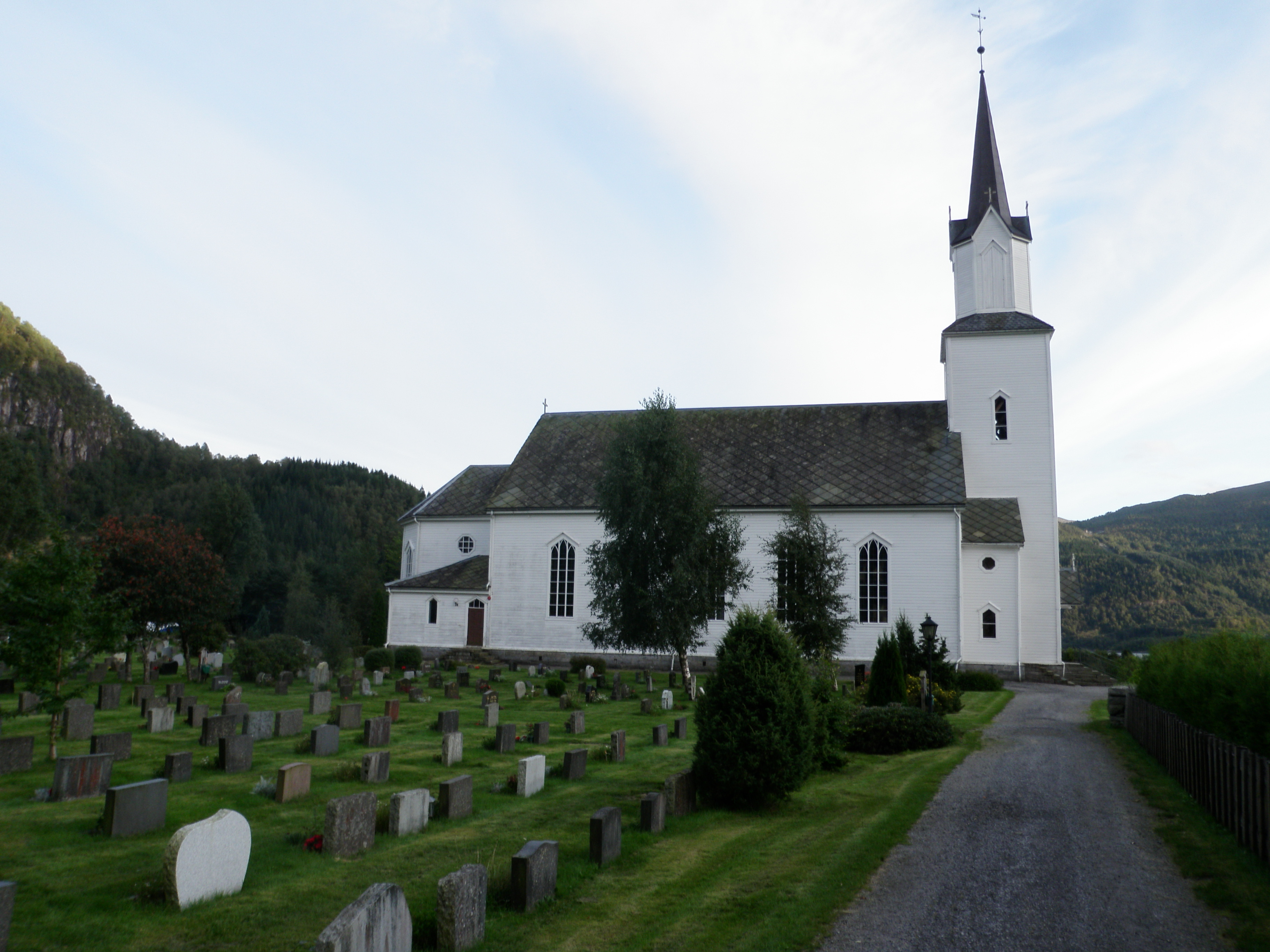
Naustdal Church in Sogn og Fjordane (1891)

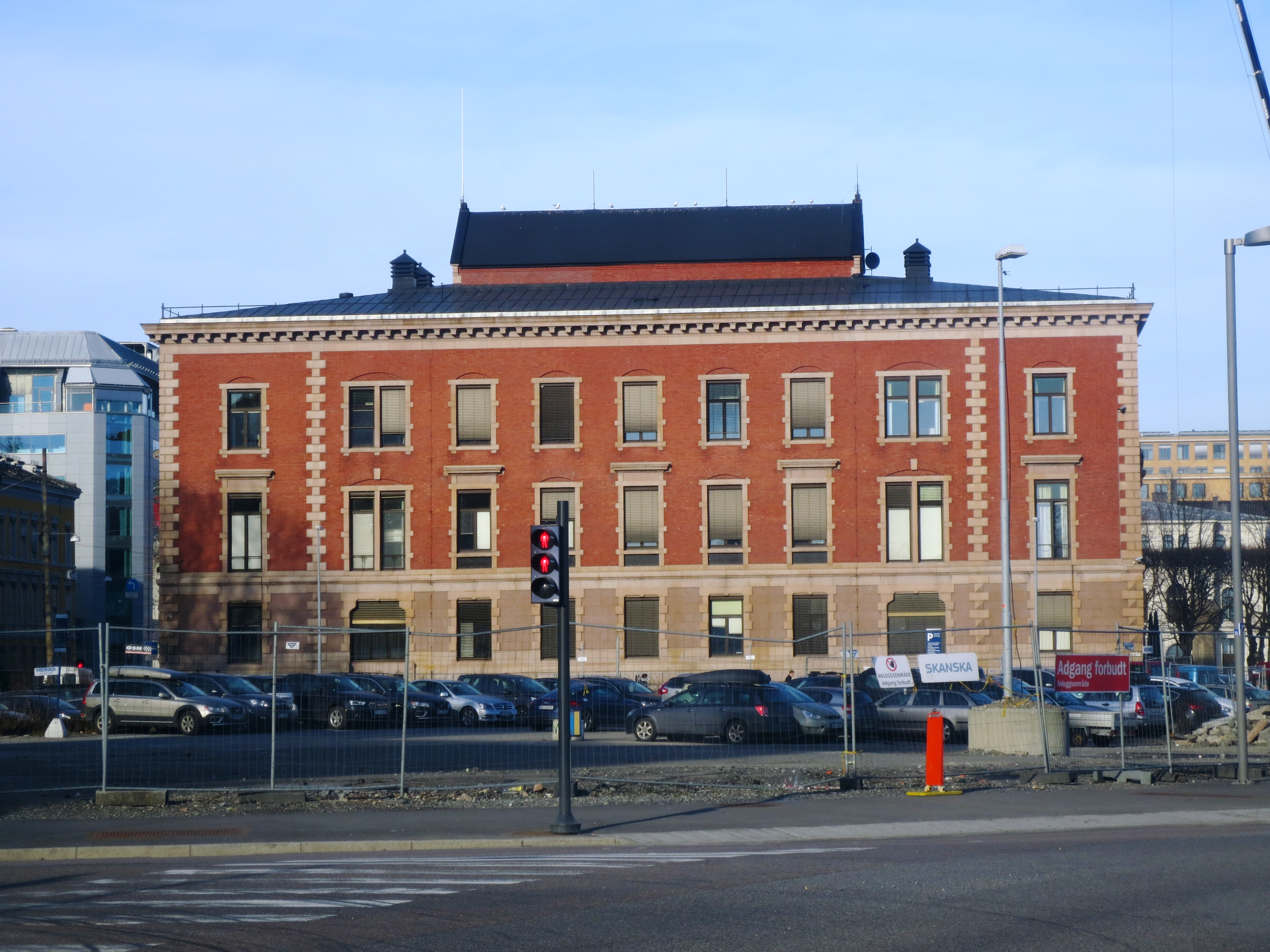
Oslo Customs House (1896)
