= Vestre Aker Church =

- Vestre Aker kirke
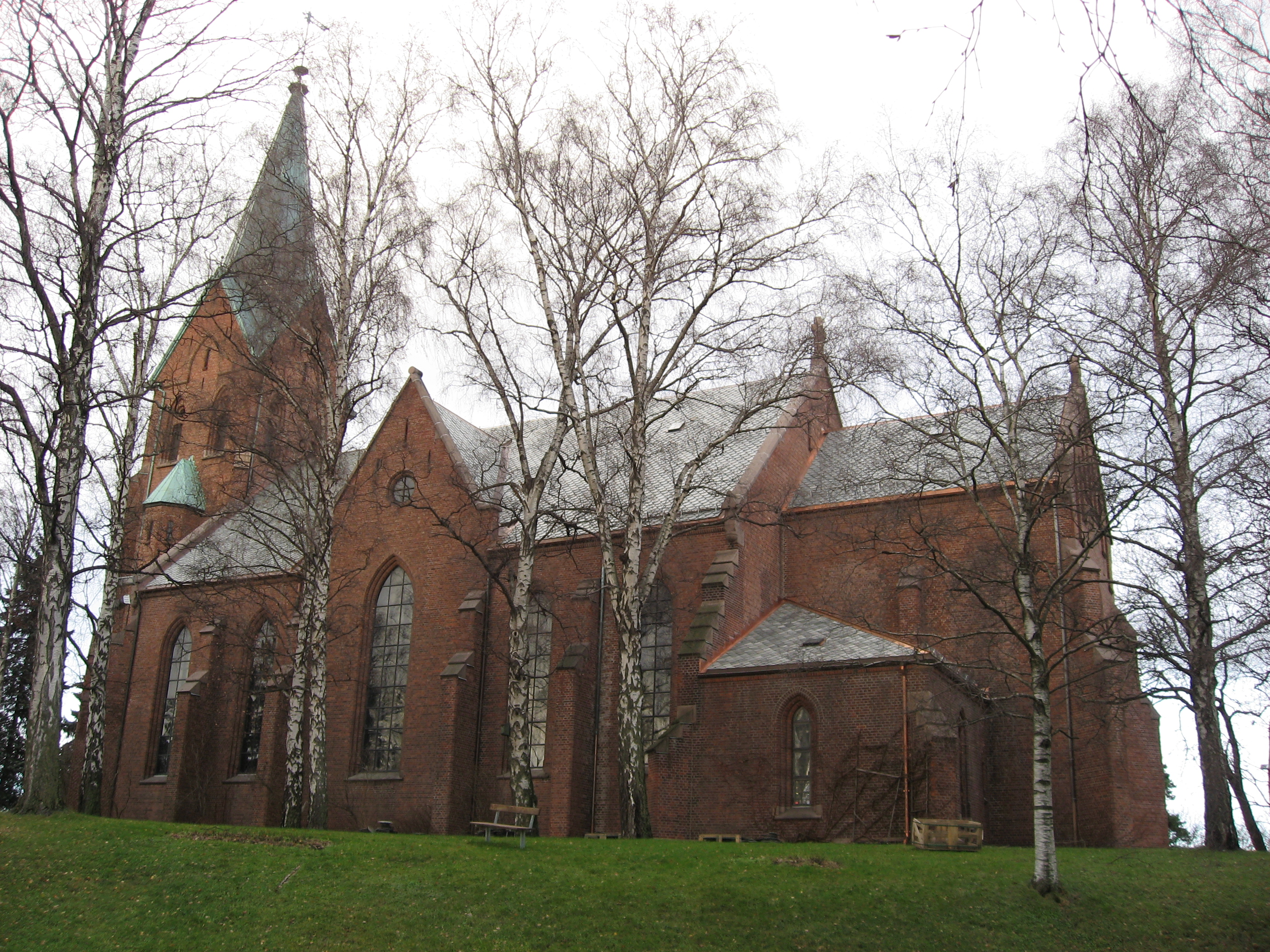

- Location within Oslo Location within Norway
- 59°56′11.57″N 10°43′45.9″E
- Location: Ullevålsveien 117, Oslo,
- Country: Norway
- Denomination: Church of Norway
- Churchmanship: Evangelical Lutheran
- Website: kirken.no/bmv

History
- Former name: Aker kirke
- Status: Parish church
- Consecrated: 1855

Architecture
- Functional status: Active
- Architect: Heinrich Ernst Schirmer
- Style: Neo Gothic

Specifications
- Capacity: 500
- Materials: Brick

Administration
- Diocese: Diocese of Oslo
- Parish: Bakkehaugen, Majorstuen og Vestre Aker

Vestre Aker Church is a church at Ullevaal in Oslo that was consecrated in 1855. The church was at first named Aker Church, but was renamed to Vestre Aker Church in 1861.

The church is built in Neo Gothic style, drawn by architect Heinrich Ernst Schirmer. After the last restoration in 1969 it has about 500 seats. The pulpit was drawn by Alexis de Chateauneuf about 1850, and did originally appear in Oslo Cathedral. Stained glass windows are made by Bernhard Greve, center field in 1939 and the side windows in 1955. The church has a church organ with 27 voices. The bell tower contains two church bells.

By the church is Vestre Aker Cemetery that was inaugurated simultaneously with the church in 1855 and a parish house that was built in 1983.

Vestre Aker Church is protected by law as a cultural monument, and has the number 85816 in the heritage data base of the Norwegian Directorate for Cultural Heritage.
