= Herman Wedel Major =

Norwegian psychiatrist

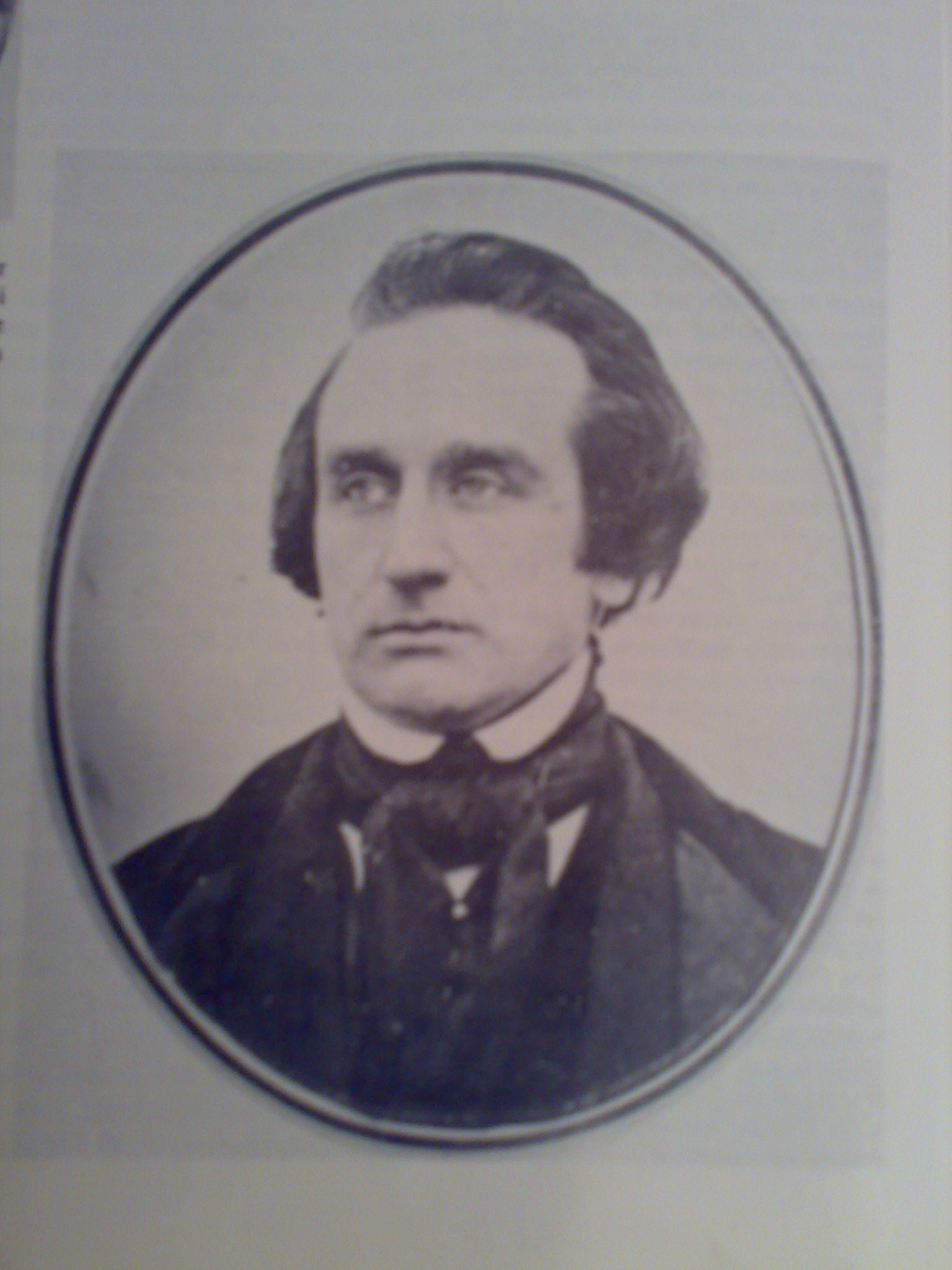
- Born: 23 February 1814; Kristiansand, Norway
- Died: 26 September 1854 (aged 40)
- Occupation: Psychiatrist

Herman Wedel Major (23 February 1814 – 26 September 1854) was a Norwegian psychiatrist. He is regarded as the father of the first Norwegian psychiatric hospital, Gaustad Hospital (Gaustad sykehus) and of the Norwegian Mental Health Act of 1848 regarding mental illness.

Major was born at the Kristiansand borough of Oddernes in Vest-Agder, Norway. He was one of nine children born to Irish immigrant Robert Gonsalvo Major (1766–1839) and Benedicte Sophie Weidemann (1783–1859). His father had left Ireland in the aftermath of the Irish Rebellion of 1798.

Major became a medical student in 1832 and was licensed as a physician in November 1842. He received a grant from the Norwegian Parliament and traveled to institutions in Schleswig, Great Britain, France and Belgium to study the conditions for the mentally ill (1843-1845). Major was for several years a doctor at the Oslo Hospital and was authorized as manager there from 1851.

During 1845, the Norwegian Parliament allocated funds to purchase land for an intended state asylum. In 1847, Gaustad outside Christiania (now Oslo) submitted a plan and in 1850 it was formally decided that the institution should be built there. Gaustad Hospital was not completed until 1855, after the death of Herman Wedel Major.

In 1850, Major married Ida Cathrine Grüning (1821-1854). They had two daughters. He and his family all died in the ship collision between the American Paddle steamer SS Arctic and the French steamship SS Vesta on 26 September 1854 off the coast of Newfoundland.

== See also ==
- SS Arctic disaster
