= Vartdal =

Vartdal may refer to:

== Places ==
- Vartdal, Møre og Romsdal, a village in Ørsta Municipality in Møre og Romsdal county, Norway
- Vartdal Municipality, a former municipality in Møre og Romsdal county, Norway
- Vartdal Church, a church in Ørsta Municipality in Møre og Romsdal county, Norway
- Vartdal Fjord, or Vartdalsfjorden, a fjord in Møre og Romsdal county, Norway
- Mount Vartdal, a mountain along the east coast of Graham Land, Antarctica

== People ==
- Knut Vartdal (born 1940), a Norwegian politician from the Centre Party

== See also ==
- Vardal Municipality
