= Vartdal Municipality =

Former municipality in Møre og Romsdal, Norway

Vartdal Municipality Vartdal herred
- Former municipality
- Vartdalsstranden herred (historic name)
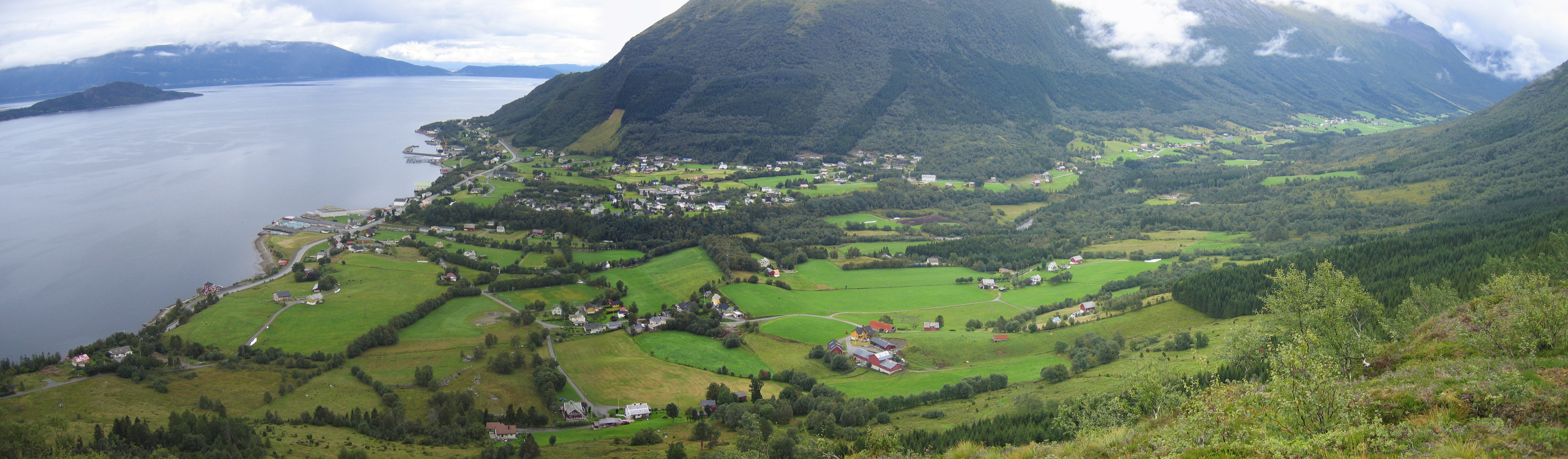
- View of Sætre in Vartdal

- Møre og Romsdal within Norway

- Vartdal within Møre og Romsdal
- Coordinates: 62°18′01″N 06°04′59″E
- Country: Norway
- County: Møre og Romsdal
- District: Sunnmøre
- Established: 1 Jan 1895
  - Preceded by: Ulstein Municipality
- Disestablished: 1 Jan 1964
  - Succeeded by: Ørsta Municipality
- Administrative centre: Sætre

Government
  - Mayor (1961–1963): Olav Myklebust

Area (upon dissolution)
  - Total: 123.5 km^{2} (47.7 sq mi)
  - Rank: #473 in Norway
- Highest elevation: 1,419 m (4,656 ft)

Population (1963)
  - Total: 1,315
  - Rank: #563 in Norway
  - Density: 10.6/km^{2} (27/sq mi)
  - Change (10 years): ▲ +14%
- Demonym: Vartdaling

Official language
  - Norwegian form: Nynorsk
- Time zone: UTC+01:00 (CET)
  - Summer (DST): UTC+02:00 (CEST)
- ISO 3166 code: NO-1521

Vartdal is a former municipality in Møre og Romsdal county, Norway. The 123.5-square-kilometre (47.7 sq mi) municipality existed from 1895 until its dissolution in 1964. The area is now part of Ørsta Municipality in the traditional district of Sunnmøre. The administrative centre was the village of Sætre (which is also known as Vartdal). Other villages in the municipality included Flåskjer and Nordre Vartdal. The main church for Vartdal was Vartdal Church, located in the village of Nordre Vartdal.

Prior to its dissolution in 1964, the 123.5-square-kilometre (47.7 sq mi) municipality was the 473rd largest by area out of the 689 municipalities in Norway. Vartdal Municipality was the 563rd most populous municipality in Norway with a population of about 1,315. The municipality's population density was 10.6 inhabitants per square kilometre (27/sq mi) and its population had increased by 14% over the previous 10-year period.

== General information ==
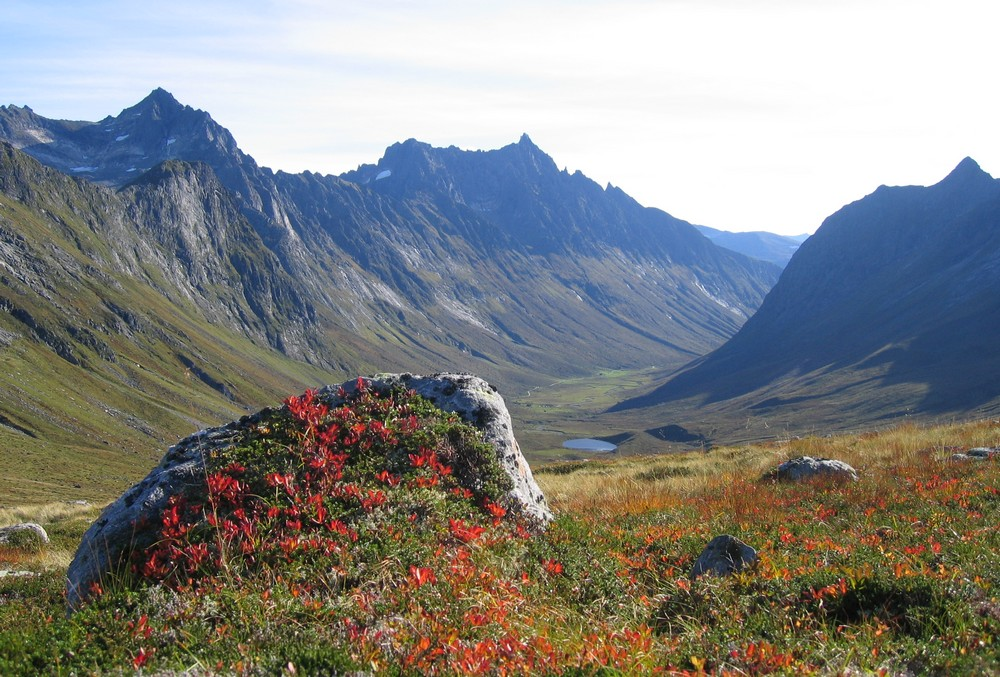
View of the Romedalen valley in Vartdal

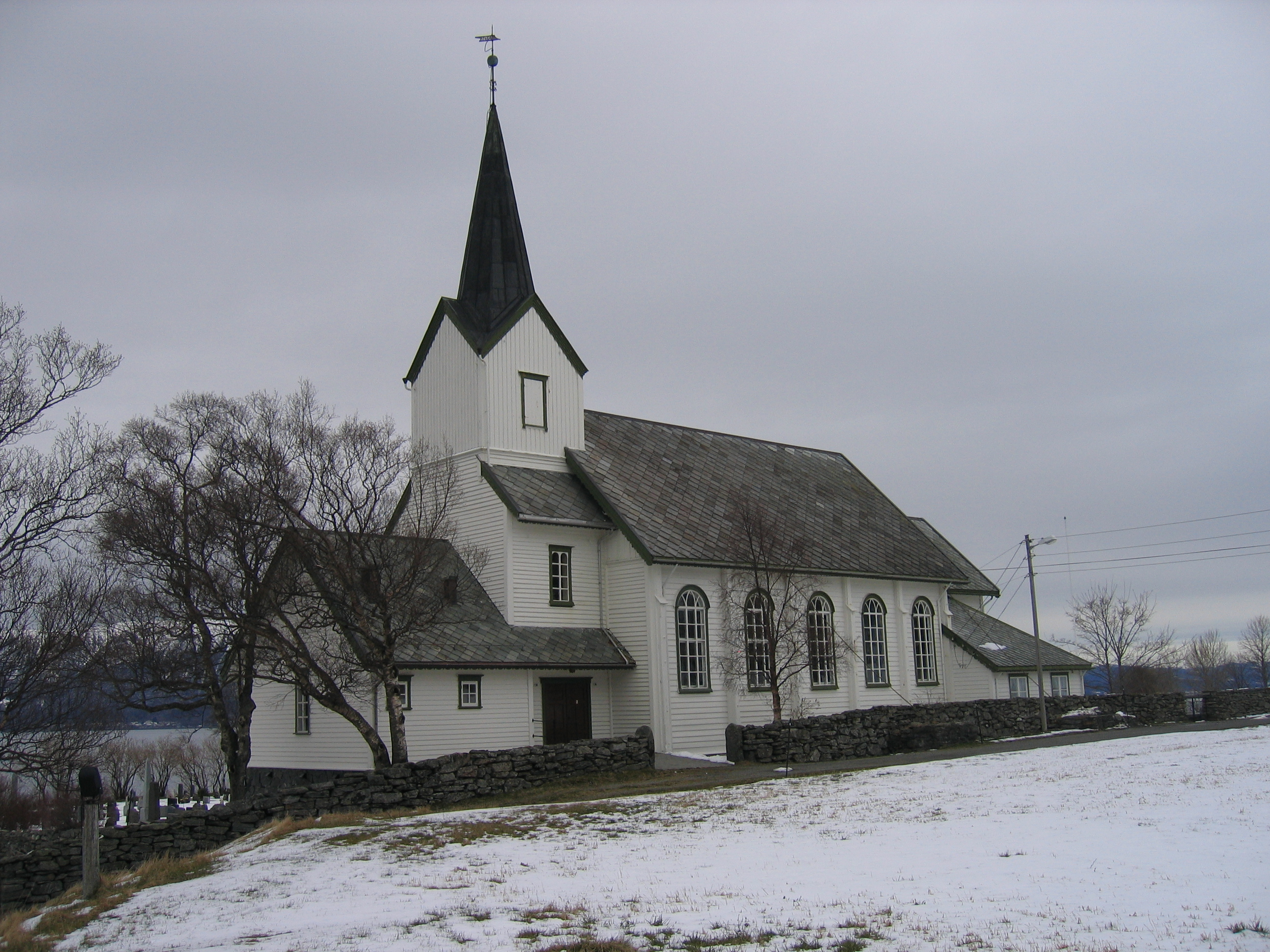
View of Vartdal Church

The municipality was established on 1 January 1895 when Ulstein Municipality was divided into two municipalities. The part of Ulstein Municipality located north of the Vartdalsfjorden (population: 2,996) remained as a smaller Ulstein Municipality and the part of the old Ulstein Municipality located south of the Vartdalsfjorden (population: 736) became the new Vartdalsstrand Municipality. The name was officially shortened to Vartdal Municipality in 1918.

During the 1960s, there were many municipal mergers across Norway due to the work of the Schei Committee. On 1 January 1964, Vartdal Municipality (population: 1,315) was merged with Hjørundfjord Municipality (population: 1,728) and Ørsta Municipality (population: 6,209) to form a new, larger Ørsta Municipality.

=== Name ===
The municipality (originally the parish) is named after the old Vartdal farm (Old Norse: Varpdalr or Verpdalr) since the first Vartdal Church was built there. The first element comes from the old name for a local river. The name of the river comes from the word verpa, or its past tense form varp, which means "to cast" or "to throw" a fishing net. The last element is dalr which means "valley" or "dale". Historically, the municipal name was Vartdalsstranden. The suffix -stranden is the definite singular form of the Old Norse word strǫnd which means "beach" or "shore". Historically, the name of the municipality was spelled Vartdalsstranden. On 3 November 1917, a royal resolution changed the spelling of the name of the municipality to Vartdal.

=== Churches ===
The Church of Norway had one parish (sokn) within Vartdal Municipality. At the time of the municipal dissolution, it was part of the Ørsta prestegjeld and the Søre Sunnmøre prosti (deanery) in the Diocese of Bjørgvin.

Churches in Vartdal Municipality
Parish (sokn)	Church name	Location of the church	Year built
Vartdal	Vartdal Church	Nordre Vartdal	1876

== Geography ==
Vartdal Municipality was located on the southern shore of the Vartdalsfjorden, in the Sunnmørsalpane mountains. The highest point in the municipality was the 1,419-metre (4,656 ft) tall mountain Jønshornet, located on the border with Hjørundfjord Municipality. Ørsta Municipality was located to the south, Hjørundfjord Municipality was located to the east, Hareid Municipality was located to the northwest (across the Vartdalsfjorden), and Ålesund Municipality was located to the north (also across the fjord).

== Government ==
While it existed, Vartdal Municipality was responsible for primary education (through 10th grade), outpatient health services, senior citizen services, welfare and other social services, zoning, economic development, and municipal roads and utilities. The municipality was governed by a municipal council of directly elected representatives. The mayor was indirectly elected by a vote of the municipal council. The municipality was under the jurisdiction of the Frostating Court of Appeal.

=== Municipal council ===
The municipal council (Heradsstyre) of Vartdal Municipality was made up of 17 representatives that were elected to four year terms. The tables below show the historical composition of the council by political party.

Vartdal heradsstyre 1959–1963
Party name (in Nynorsk)	Number of representatives
Local List(s) (Lokale lister)	17
Total number of members:	17
Note: On 1 January 1964, Vartdal Municipality became part of Ørsta Municipality.

Vartdal heradsstyre 1955–1959
Party name (in Nynorsk)	Number of representatives
Local List(s) (Lokale lister)	17
Total number of members:	17

Vartdal heradsstyre 1951–1955
Party name (in Nynorsk)	Number of representatives
Labour Party (Arbeidarpartiet)	2
Local List(s) (Lokale lister)	14
Total number of members:	16

Vartdal heradsstyre 1947–1951
Party name (in Nynorsk)	Number of representatives
Labour Party (Arbeidarpartiet)	2
Local List(s) (Lokale lister)	14
Total number of members:	16

Vartdal heradsstyre 1945–1947
Party name (in Nynorsk)	Number of representatives
List of workers, fishermen, and small farmholders (Arbeidarar, fiskarar, småbrukarar liste)	3
Local List(s) (Lokale lister)	13
Total number of members:	16

Vartdal heradsstyre 1937–1941*
Party name (in Nynorsk)	Number of representatives
Labour Party (Arbeidarpartiet)	3
Local List(s) (Lokale lister)	13
Total number of members:	16
Note: Due to the German occupation of Norway during World War II, no elections were held for new municipal councils until after the war ended in 1945.

=== Mayors ===
The mayor (Nynorsk: ordførar) of Vartdal Municipality was the political leader of the municipality and the chairperson of the municipal council. The following people have held this position:

- 1895–1911: Hans O. Vartdal
- 1911–1912: Olav O. Myklebust
- 1912–1922: Laurits K. Grønnevet
- 1923–1925: Ola Erdal
- 1926–1928: Laurits K. Grønnevet
- 1929–1937: Steinar Buset
- 1937–1942: Knut Vartdal
- 1942–1945: Bernt R. Festøy (NS)
- 1945–1947: Knut Vartdal
- 1947–1951: Bergsvein Aarset
- 1951–1955: Olav Myklebust
- 1955–1957: Bergsvein Aarset
- 1957–1961: Pål Myklebust
- 1961–1963: Olav Myklebust

== Notable people ==
- Helge Barstad, a politician
- Eldar Westre, a baker

== See also ==
- List of former municipalities of Norway
