= Vikebladet Vestposten =

Norwegian newspaper

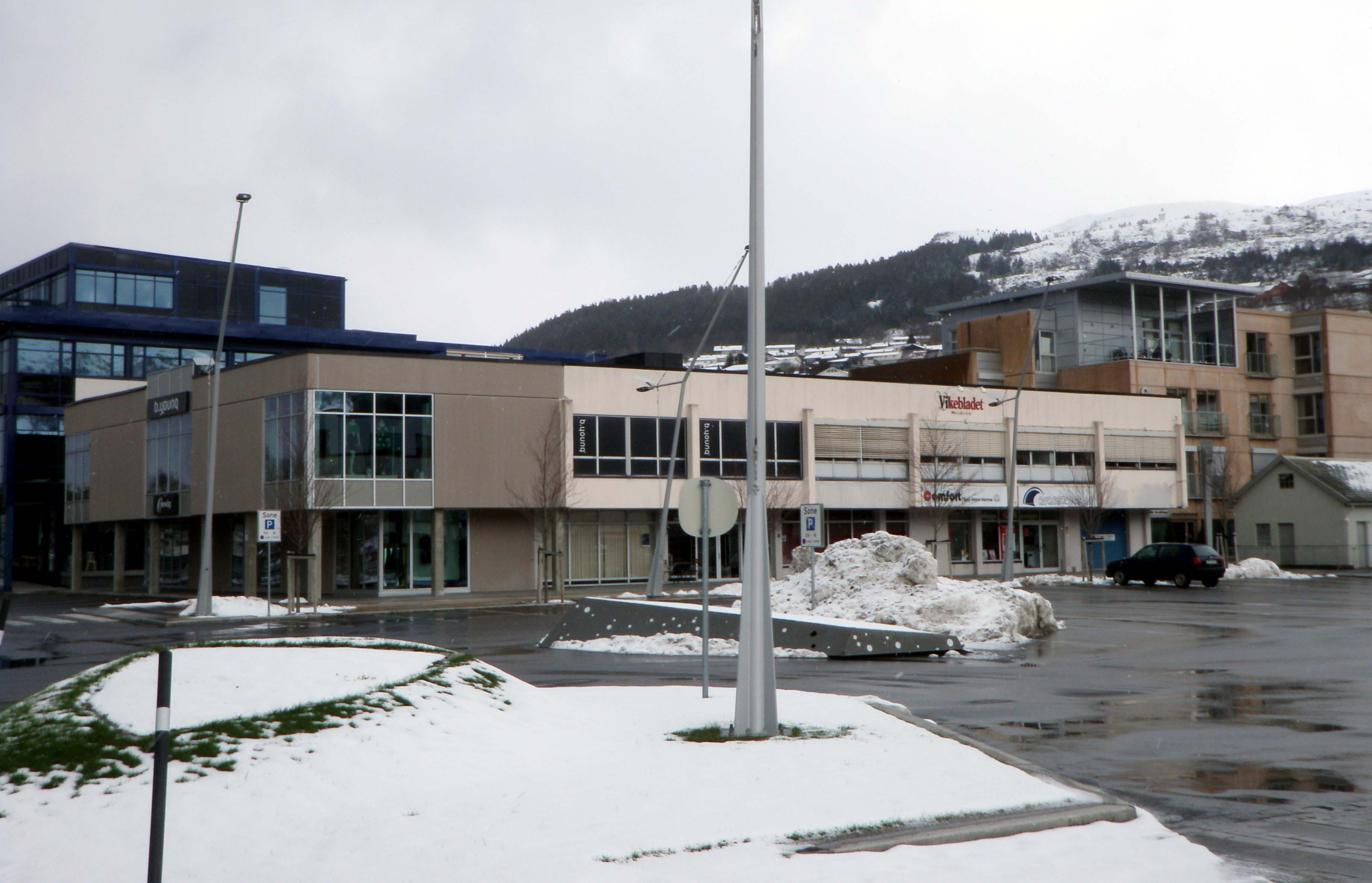
Offices of Vikebladet in Ulsteinvik

Vikebladet Vestposten is the major local newspaper for Ulstein Municipality and Hareid Municipality in the Sunnmøre region of Norway.

== History and profile ==
Vikebladet Vestposten is owned by Sunnmørsposten, which again is owned by Edda Media. The newspaper originally was named Vikebladet. In 1989 however, Vikebladet bought Vestposten, thus becoming Vikebladet Vestposten AS.

The newspaper is published three times weekly, and had a circulation of 4,504 copies in 2008, approximately one copy for every 2.6 residents of the two municipalities it serves. The editor of Vikebladet Vestposten is Asle Geir Johansen, while the manager is Heidi Myklebust.

Vikebladet Vestposten is published in Nynorsk.
