= Sundgota =

Village in Ulstein Municipality, Norway

Sundgota Sundgot
- Village
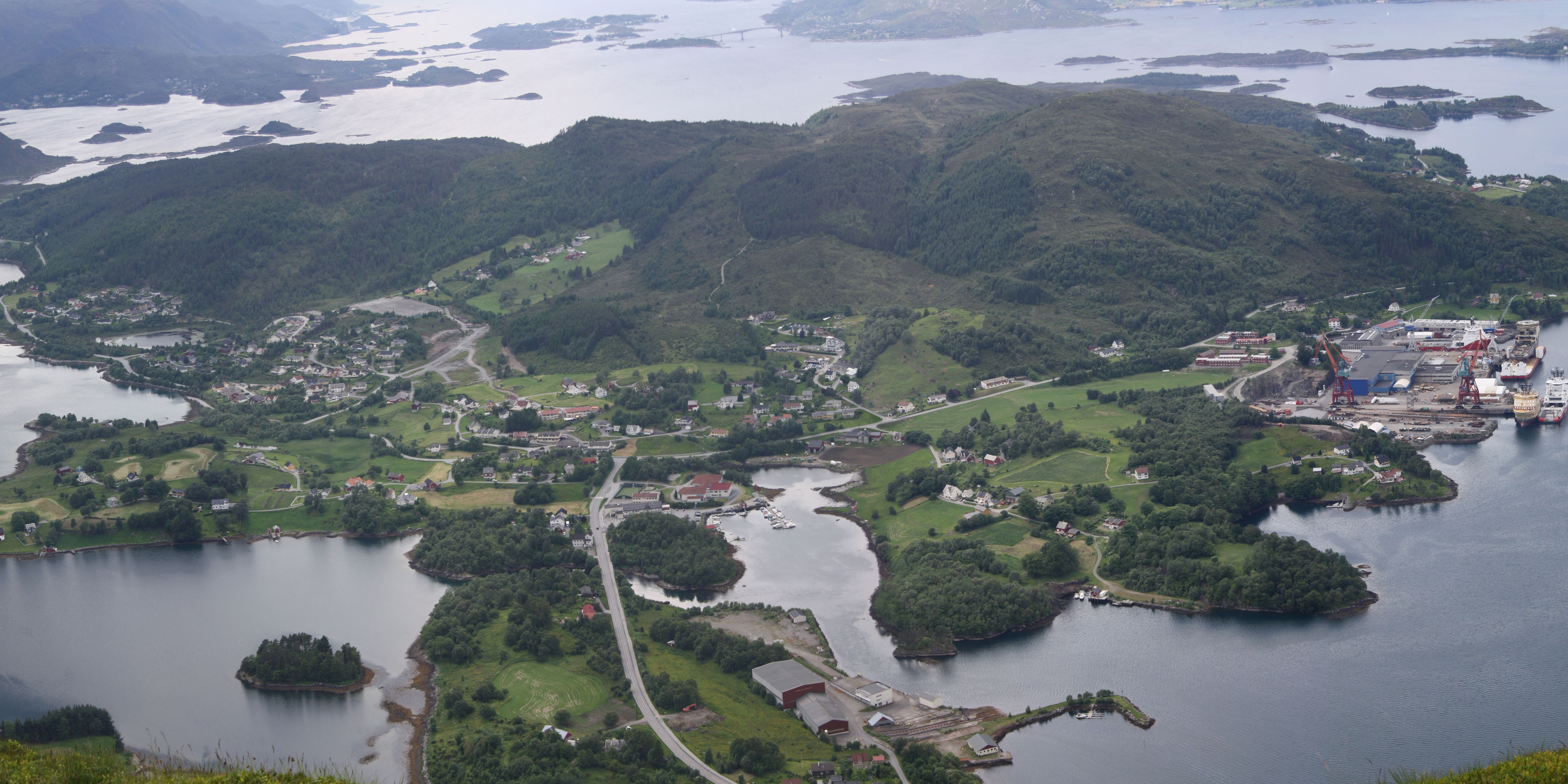
- View of the village area
- Interactive map of Sundgota
- Location within Møre og Romsdal Location within Norway
- Coordinates: 62.31571°N 5.84053°E
- Country: Norway
- Region: Western Norway
- County: Møre og Romsdal
- District: Sunnmøre
- Municipality: Ulstein Municipality

Area
  - Total: 0.74 km^{2} (0.29 sq mi)

Population (2024)
  - Total: 912
  - Density: 1,232/km^{2} (3,190/sq mi)
- Time zone: UTC+01:00 (CET)
  - Summer (DST): UTC+02:00 (CEST)
- Post Code: 6065 Ulsteinvik

Sundgota is a village in Ulstein Municipality in Møre og Romsdal county, Norway. The village is located on the island of Dimna, about 5 kilometres (3.1 mi) south of the town of Ulsteinvik.

The village is also home to Hasundgot Stadium, which is the home ground for Hasundgot IL.

The 0.74-square-kilometre (180-acre) village has a population (2024) of 912 and a population density of 1,232 inhabitants per square kilometre (3,190/sq mi).
