= Flåskjer =

Village in Ørsta Municipality, Norway

- Village
- Interactive map of Flåskjer
- Location within Møre og Romsdal Location within Norway
- Coordinates: 62.2801°N 6.0265°E
- Country: Norway
- Region: Western Norway
- County: Møre og Romsdal
- District: Sunnmøre
- Municipality: Ørsta
- Elevation: 36 m (118 ft)
- Time zone: UTC+01:00 (CET)
  - Summer (DST): UTC+02:00 (CEST)
- Post Code: 6170 Vartdal

Flåskjer is a small village in Ørsta Municipality in Møre og Romsdal county, Norway. It is located along the European route E39 highway about 3.5 kilometres (2.2 mi) southwest of the village of Vartdal. It lies at the entrance to the Flåskjer valley, along the shore of the Vartdalsfjorden.

Fishing in one of the activities available in Flåskjer.
