= Haddal =

Village in Ulstein Municipality, Norway

- Village
- Interactive map of Haddal
- Location within Møre og Romsdal Location within Norway
- Coordinates: 62.28209°N 5.86887°E
- Country: Norway
- Region: Western Norway
- County: Møre og Romsdal
- District: Sunnmøre
- Municipality: Ulstein Municipality

Area
  - Total: 0.35 km^{2} (0.14 sq mi)
- Elevation: 17 m (56 ft)

Population (2012)
  - Total: 323
  - Density: 923/km^{2} (2,390/sq mi)
- Time zone: UTC+01:00 (CET)
  - Summer (DST): UTC+02:00 (CEST)
- Post Code: 6064 Haddal

Haddal is a settlement in Ulstein Municipality in Møre og Romsdal county. Haddal is located on the southern part of the island of Hareidlandet about 9 kilometres (5.6 mi) south of the town of Ulsteinvik and about 6 kilometres (3.7 mi) northwest of the village of Eiksund.

The 0.35-square-kilometre (86-acre) village had a population (2012) of 323 and a population density of 923 inhabitants per square kilometre (2,390/sq mi). Since 2012, the population and area data for this village area has not been separately tracked by Statistics Norway.
