= Eiksund Bridge =

Bridge in Møre og Romsdal, Norway

Eiksund Bridge Eiksundbrua
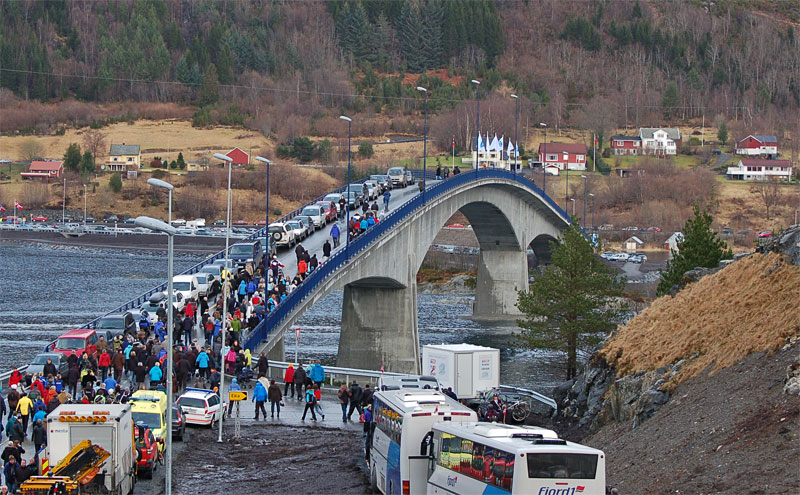
- The opening of the bridge
- Coordinates: 62°14′55″N 5°53′47″E
- Carries: Fv653
- Locale: Ulstein Municipality, Norway

Characteristics
- Design: Cantilever bridge
- Material: Concrete
- Total length: 405 m (1,329 ft)
- Width: 9.3 m (31 ft)
- Longest span: 132 m (433 ft)
- No. of spans: 5
- Clearance below: 16 m (52 ft)

History
- Construction end: 2005
- Construction cost: 86 million kr

The Eiksund Bridge (Norwegian: Eiksundbrua) is a cantilever bridge in Ulstein Municipality in the Sunnmøre region of Møre og Romsdal county, Norway. The bridge is connected to the Eiksund Tunnel as part of the Eiksund Sambandet which joins several islands in the municipalities of Ulstein, Herøy, Sande, and Hareid to the mainland, without the use of ferries.

The bridge runs from the village of Eiksund on Hareidlandet island to the western part of the island of Eika. The bridge is 405 metres (1,329 ft) long and 9.3 metres (31 ft) wide. It has 5 spans, of which the longest is 132 metres (433 ft). The sailing space underneath is 20 metres (66 ft) across, with a maximum height of 16 metres (52 ft).

The bridge was finished in 2005, but connections with the Eiksund Tunnel were not available until it officially opened in February 2008. Until then, only local traffic between Hareidlandet and Eika could use the bridge.

In February 2006, the Mechanical Contractors Association stated that Eiksund Bridge had been built too small, and was dangerous to use, especially in the snow.

== See also ==
- List of bridges in Norway
- List of bridges in Norway by length
