= Dimnøya =

Island in Møre og Romsdal, Norway

Dimna Dimnøya
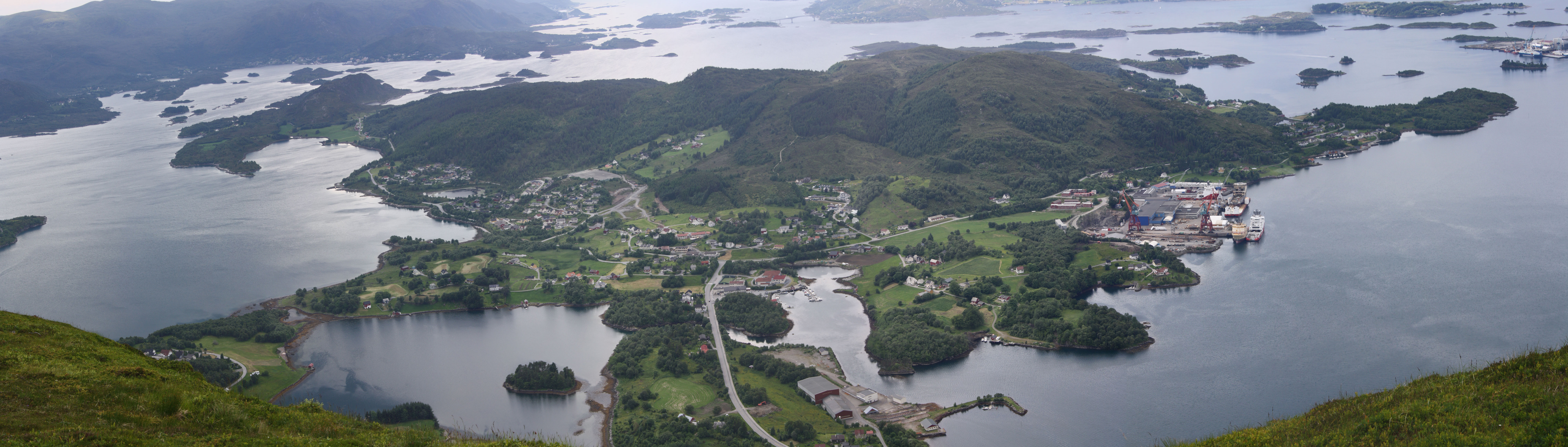
- Interactive map of Dimna; Dimnøya

Geography
- Location: Møre og Romsdal, Norway
- Coordinates: 62.3117°N 5.8076°E
- Area: 9 km^{2} (3.5 sq mi)
- Length: 5 km (3.1 mi)
- Width: 4 km (2.5 mi)
- Highest elevation: 240 m (790 ft)
- Highest point: Høgåsen

Administration
- Norway
- County: Møre og Romsdal
- Municipality: Ulstein Municipality

Demographics
- Population: 1347 (2020)

Dimnøya or Dimna an island in Ulstein Municipality in Møre og Romsdal county, Norway. The island had 1,347 residents in 2020, many of whom live in the village of Sundgota, the largest settlement on the island. Dimna is connected to the neighboring island of Hareidlandet to the east by a 20-metre (66 ft) wide bridge. The town of Ulsteinvik lies 2 kilometres (1.2 mi) northeast of the island.

The 9-square-kilometre (3.5 sq mi) island is about 5 kilometres (3.1 mi) long and about 4 kilometres (2.5 mi) wide. It is located about 1 kilometre (0.62 mi) north of the island of Gurskøya and about 1.5 kilometres (0.93 mi) north of the island of Leinøya, both in neighboring Herøy Municipality.

The island is best known for its sports team Dimna IL, the club of athlete Karsten Warholm.

== See also ==
- List of islands of Norway
