= Eiksund =

Village in Ulstein Municipality, Norway

- Village
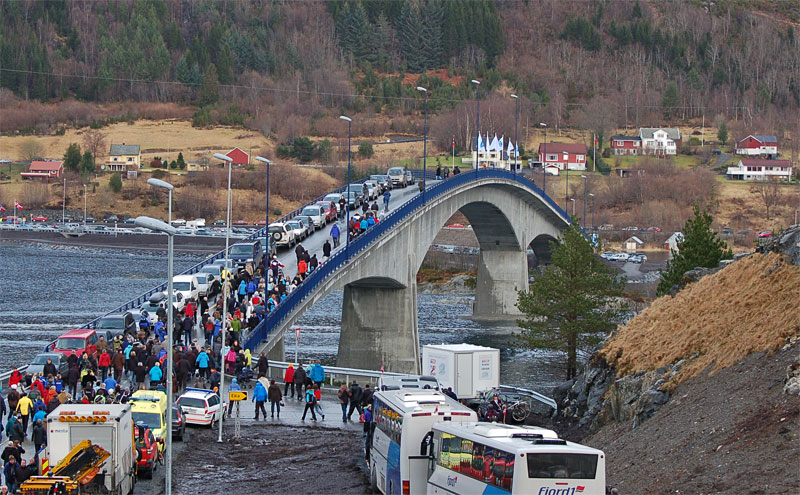
- Eiksund Bridge
- Interactive map of Eiksund
- Location within Møre og Romsdal Location within Norway
- Coordinates: 62.2529°N 5.9032°E
- Country: Norway
- Region: Western Norway
- County: Møre og Romsdal
- District: Sunnmøre
- Municipality: Ulstein Municipality
- Elevation: 25 m (82 ft)
- Time zone: UTC+01:00 (CET)
  - Summer (DST): UTC+02:00 (CEST)
- Post Code: 6068 Eiksund

Eiksund is a village in Ulstein Municipality in Møre og Romsdal county, Norway. It is located on the southern tip of the island of Hareidlandet. The small island of Eika lies just off the shore from Eiksund. The village is located about 5 kilometres (3.1 mi) southeast of the village of Haddal and about 15 kilometres (9.3 mi) southeast of the town of Ulsteinvik.

== History ==
Since 1838, Eiksund was administratively a part of Sande Municipality, despite being separated from the rest of Sande by the sea (see formannskapsdistrikt law). On 1 January 1889, the Eiksund area and the island of Eika (population: 119) were transferred to Herøy Municipality. Then on 1 January 1964, Eiksund and Eika (population: 222) were transferred to Ulstein Municipality.

== Transportation ==
Until 2008, Eiksund was connected to Rjåneset in the neighbouring Ørsta Municipality on the mainland by a ferry, since there were no road connections to Eiksund on the island of Hareidlandet. In 2005, the Eiksund Bridge connected Eiksund to the nearby island of Eika. On 23 February 2008, the Eiksund Tunnel was opened by the Norwegian Minister of Transport and Communications, Liv Signe Navarsete. The undersea tunnel connects Eika (and thus Eiksund) to the mainland in Ørsta. The Eiksund Tunnel is the world's deepest road tunnel, with its lowest point at 287 metres (942 ft) below sea level.
