= Nordre Vartdal =

Village in Ørsta Municipality, Norway

- Village
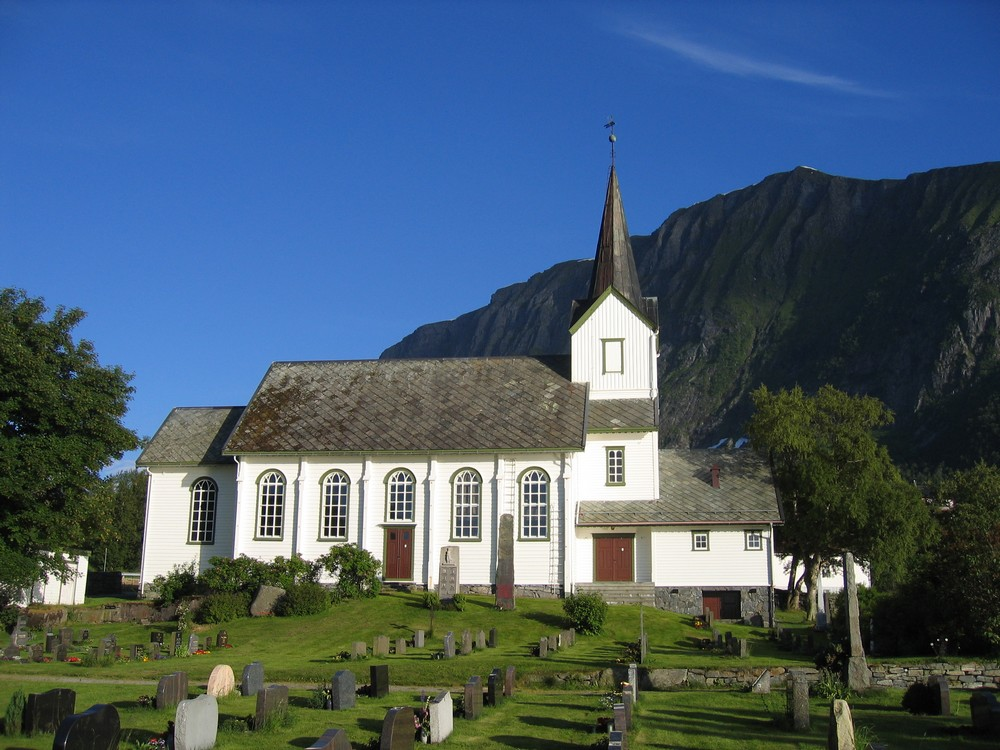
- View of the local church
- Interactive map of Nordre Vartdal
- Location within Møre og Romsdal Location within Norway
- Coordinates: 62.3248°N 6.1433°E
- Country: Norway
- Region: Western Norway
- County: Møre og Romsdal
- District: Sunnmøre
- Municipality: Ørsta
- Elevation: 5 m (16 ft)
- Time zone: UTC+01:00 (CET)
  - Summer (DST): UTC+02:00 (CEST)
- Post Code: 6170 Vartdal

Nordre Vartdal is a village in Ørsta Municipality in Møre og Romsdal, Norway. The village is located along the Vartdalsfjorden about 4 kilometres (2.5 mi) northeast of the village of Vartdal. The village sits at the entrance to the Ådalen valley, at the mouth of the Storelva river. The European route E39 highway runs through Nordre Vartdal, right past Vartdal Church, which sits on the shore of the fjord.
