= Ulstein Church =

Church in Møre og Romsdal, Norway

- Ulstein kyrkje
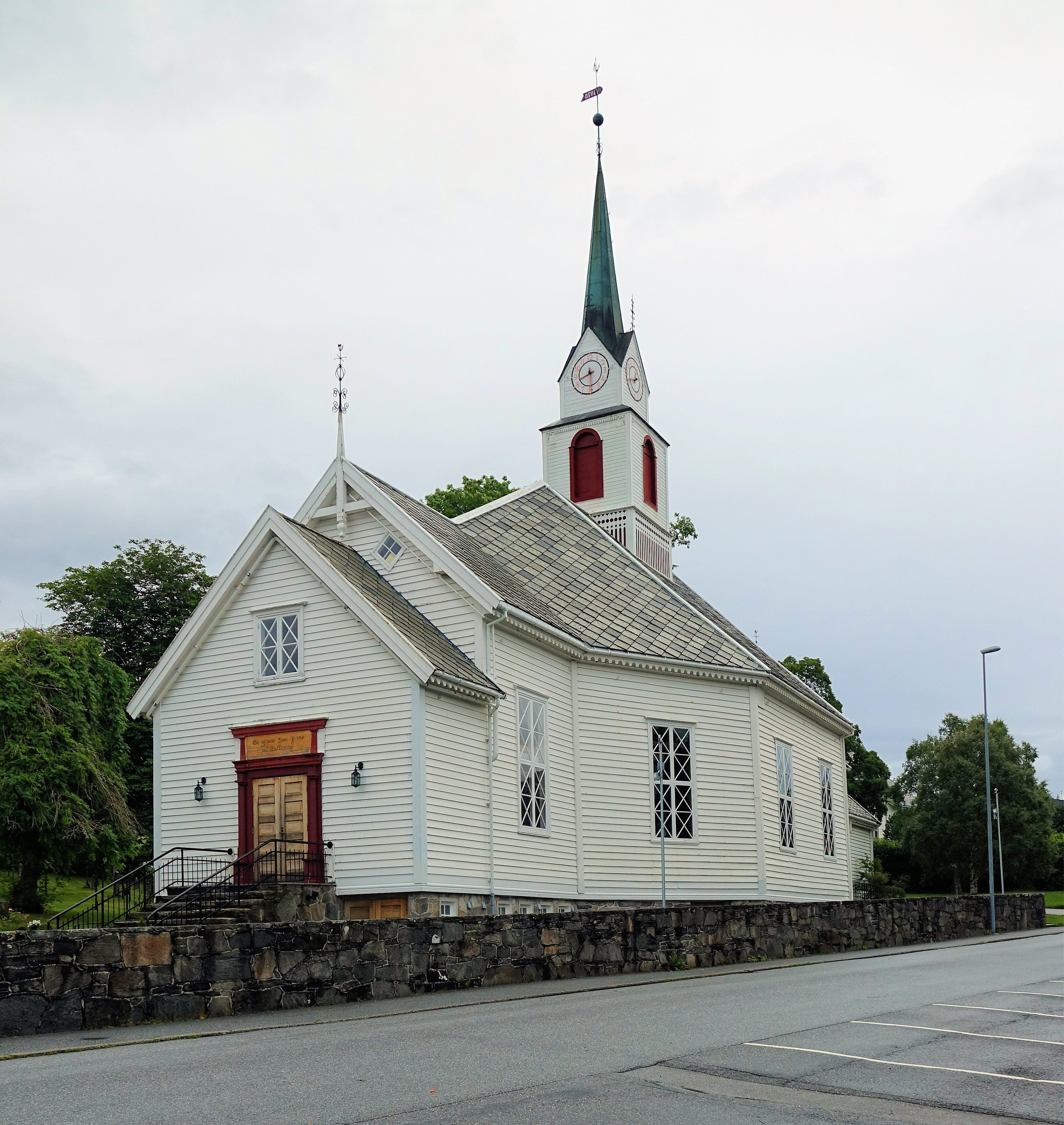
- View of the church
- Ulstein Church
- 62°20′40″N 5°50′46″E
- Location: Ulstein, Møre og Romsdal
- Country: Norway
- Denomination: Church of Norway
- Churchmanship: Evangelical Lutheran

History
- Status: Parish church
- Founded: 12th century
- Consecrated: 13 May 1849

Architecture
- Functional status: Active
- Architect: Hans Nicolai Wraamann
- Architectural type: Octagonal
- Completed: 1849 (177 years ago)

Specifications
- Capacity: 400
- Materials: Wood

Administration
- Diocese: Møre bispedømme
- Deanery: Søre Sunnmøre prosti
- Parish: Ulstein
- Norwegian Cultural Heritage Site
- Type: Church
- Status: Automatically protected
- ID: 85721

Ulstein Church (Norwegian: Ulstein kyrkje) is a parish church of the Church of Norway in Ulstein Municipality in Møre og Romsdal county, Norway. It is located in the town of Ulsteinvik on the western side of the island of Hareidlandet. It is the church for the Ulstein parish which is part of the Søre Sunnmøre prosti (deanery) in the Diocese of Møre. The white, wooden church was designed in an octagonal design in 1849 using plans drawn up by Hans Nicolai Wraamann, the local parish priest. The church seats about 400 people. Originally, the church was built about 2 kilometres (1.2 mi) north of Ulsteinvik, but in 1878 it was taken down and moved into Ulsteinvik.

== History ==
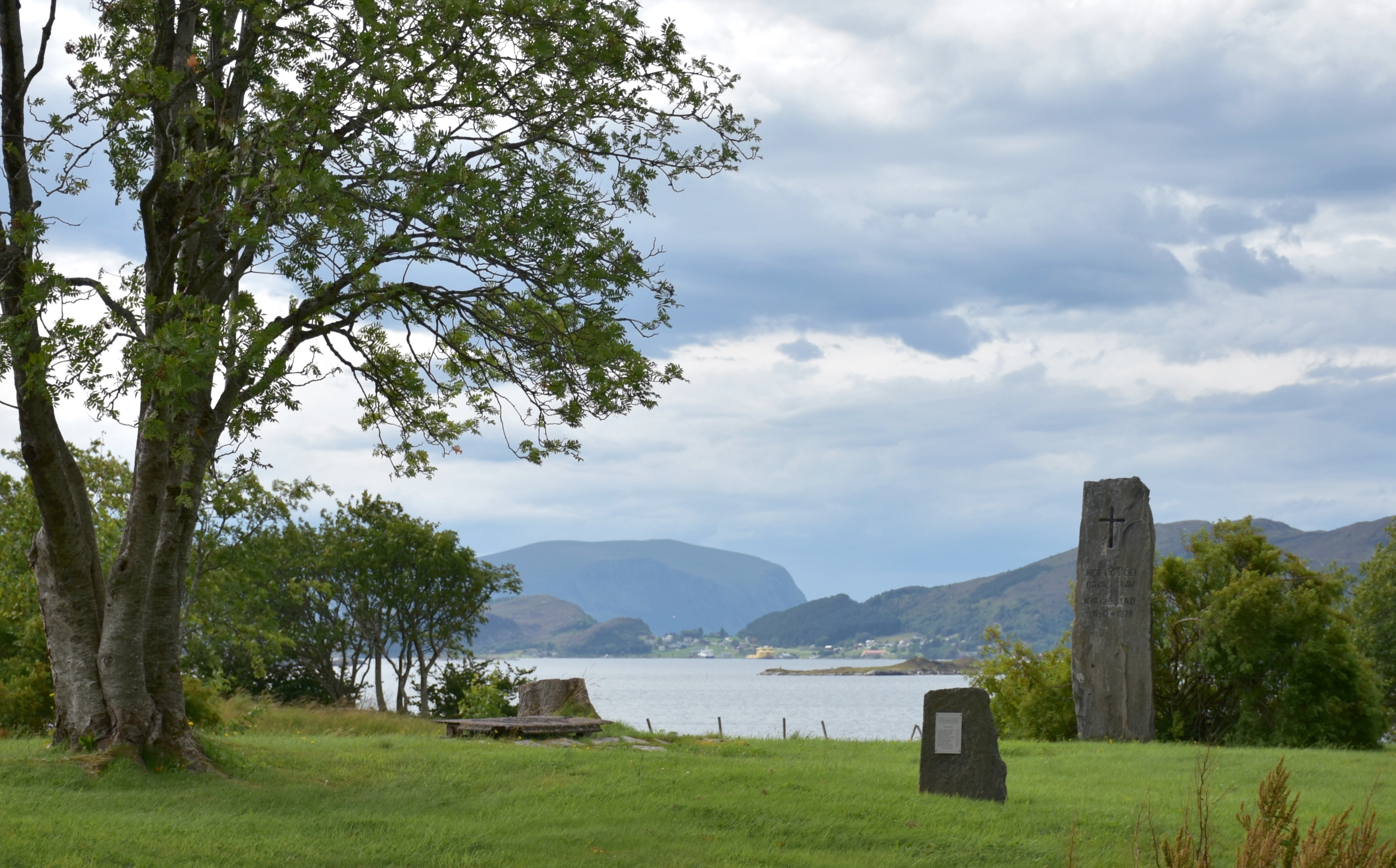
Site of the first church in Ulsteinvik.

The earliest existing historical records of the church date back to 1432, but the church was not new that year. The first church in Ulstein was a stone church that was likely built in the 12th century. The church was originally located about 2.7 kilometres (1.7 mi) northwest of Ulsteinvik. The old medieval church was made of stone and whitewashed on the inside and outside, measuring approximately 12 by 9 metres (39 ft × 30 ft) for the nave and the choir measured about 5 by 6.5 metres (16 ft × 21 ft). The nave had a main entrance on the west end and there was a small entrance on the south side of the choir. The church was not a perfect rectangle. The south wall of the nave was a little longer than the north wall, which meant the chancel was at an oblique angle to the nave. In 1660, a timber-framed transept extension was built to the south side of the nave and a new timber-framed church porch and main entrance was built on the north side of the nave. The old entrance on the west end of the nave was walled up.

On 30 October 1847, lightning struck the church tower and the building (which already was in poor condition) was heavily damaged beyond repair. The church was completely demolished and a new church was built a few meters to the west to the old church site. The new church was a timber-framed, octagonal building that had a choir and sacristy on the east end of the nave and a church porch on the west end of the nave. The new church was designed by the local parish priest Hans Nicolai Wraamann. The new church was completed in the late fall of 1848 and it was formally consecrated on 13 May 1849. During the 1870s, the parish made the big decision to move the church site from its medieval location, about 2.7 kilometres (1.7 mi) to the southeast into the village of Ulsteinvik where the majority of the parish lived. Since the current church building was relatively new and in good condition, it was decided to disassemble to the old building and move the materials to the new site where it would be rebuilt there. So, in 1878, the old church was disassembled and moved to Ulsteinvik where it was rebuilt. The new structure was nearly identical to the old building, using almost all the same materials, but there were some changes were made during the reconstruction, including making the choir larger than before. The new building was re-consecrated on 27 October 1878. In 1914, the church was restored and redecorated. In 1961, the sacristy was enlarged, and in 1968 the church porch was enlarged.

== See also ==
- List of churches in Møre
