= Ottar Kaldhol =

Norwegian politician

- Born: 30 September 1946 (age 79); Ulstein Municipality, Norway
- Occupation: Politician

Ottar Kaldhol (born 30 September 1946) is a Norwegian politician.

He was born in Ulstein Municipality to Hans Kaldhol and Judith Løseth. He was elected representative to the Storting for the period 1993–1997 for the Labour Party.
