= Vartdal Church =

Church in Møre og Romsdal, Norway

- Vartdal kyrkje
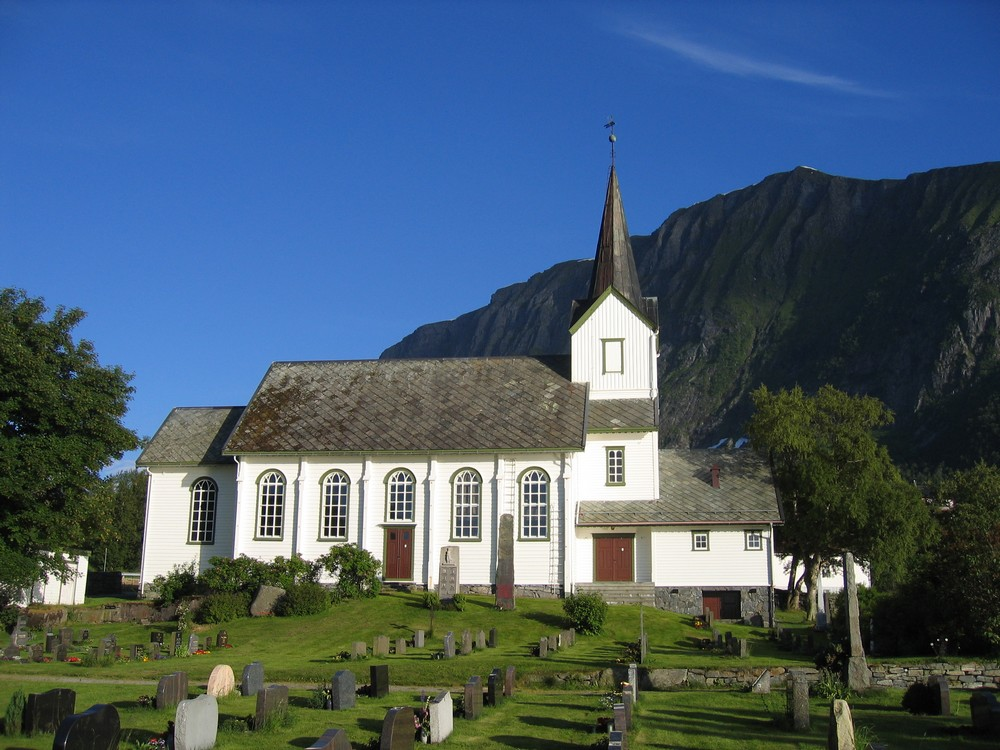
- View of the church
- Vartdal Church
- 62.3245663547°N 6.14128768444°E
- Location: Ørsta, Møre og Romsdal
- Country: Norway
- Denomination: Church of Norway
- Churchmanship: Evangelical Lutheran

History
- Status: Parish church
- Founded: 1876
- Consecrated: 1876

Architecture
- Functional status: Active
- Architect(s): Heinrich Ernst Schirmer; Wilhelm von Hanno
- Architectural type: Long church
- Completed: 1876 (150 years ago)

Specifications
- Capacity: 360
- Materials: Wood

Administration
- Diocese: Møre bispedømme
- Deanery: Søre Sunnmøre prosti
- Parish: Vartdal
- Norwegian Cultural Heritage Site
- Type: Church
- Status: Not protected
- ID: 85774

Vartdal Church (Norwegian: Vartdal kyrkje) is a parish church of the Church of Norway in Ørsta Municipality in Møre og Romsdal county, Norway. It is located in the village of Nordre Vartdal, along the Vartdalsfjorden. It is the church for the Vartdal parish which is part of the Søre Sunnmøre prosti (deanery) in the Diocese of Møre. The white, wooden church was built in a long church design in 1876 using plans drawn up by the architects Heinrich Ernst Schirmer and Wilhelm von Hanno. The church seats about 360 people.

== History ==
Historically, the people of Vartdal were part of the Ulstein Church parish. On 26 December 1841, some people from Vartdal were on a boat crossing the Vartdalsfjorden on their way to church when the boat capsized and people drowned. After this incident, demands grew for a church in Vartdal. In the 1870s, permission was granted to build a church in Vartdal. The parish decided to use Heinrich Ernst Schirmer and Wilhelm von Hanno's drawings for the recently built Ørsta Church as the plans for the new Vartdal Church. Knut L. Stokkeland was hired as the builder, and he scaled down the building somewhat from the original size based on the drawings. The tower is a little different from the one on the Ørsta Church, and also some details inside the church are different as well. A building permit for the new church was granted in May 1876, and it took just over five months to build the church (although it is possible that the foundation wall was erected before the building permit was granted). Despite being essentially completed in fall of 1867, the church was not formally consecrated until 8 April 1877, which was the first Sunday after Easter. A severe storm in March 1879 caused some damage to the new building which was repaired soon after. Since then, it has been repaired or restored several times. In 1938, the choir was renovated and the sacristy was enlarged. In 1976, the church porch was enlarged to add bathroom facilities.

== Media gallery ==
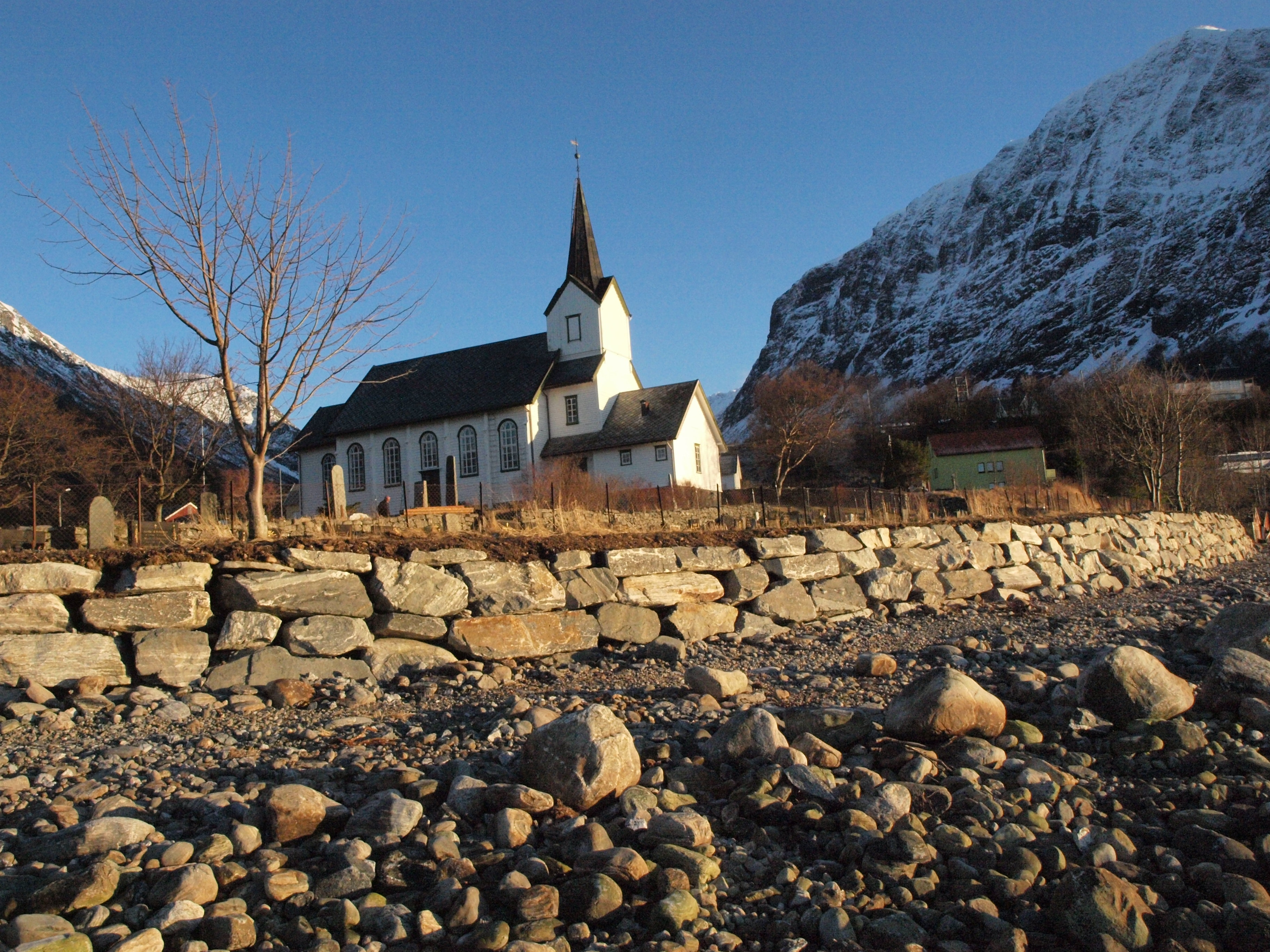

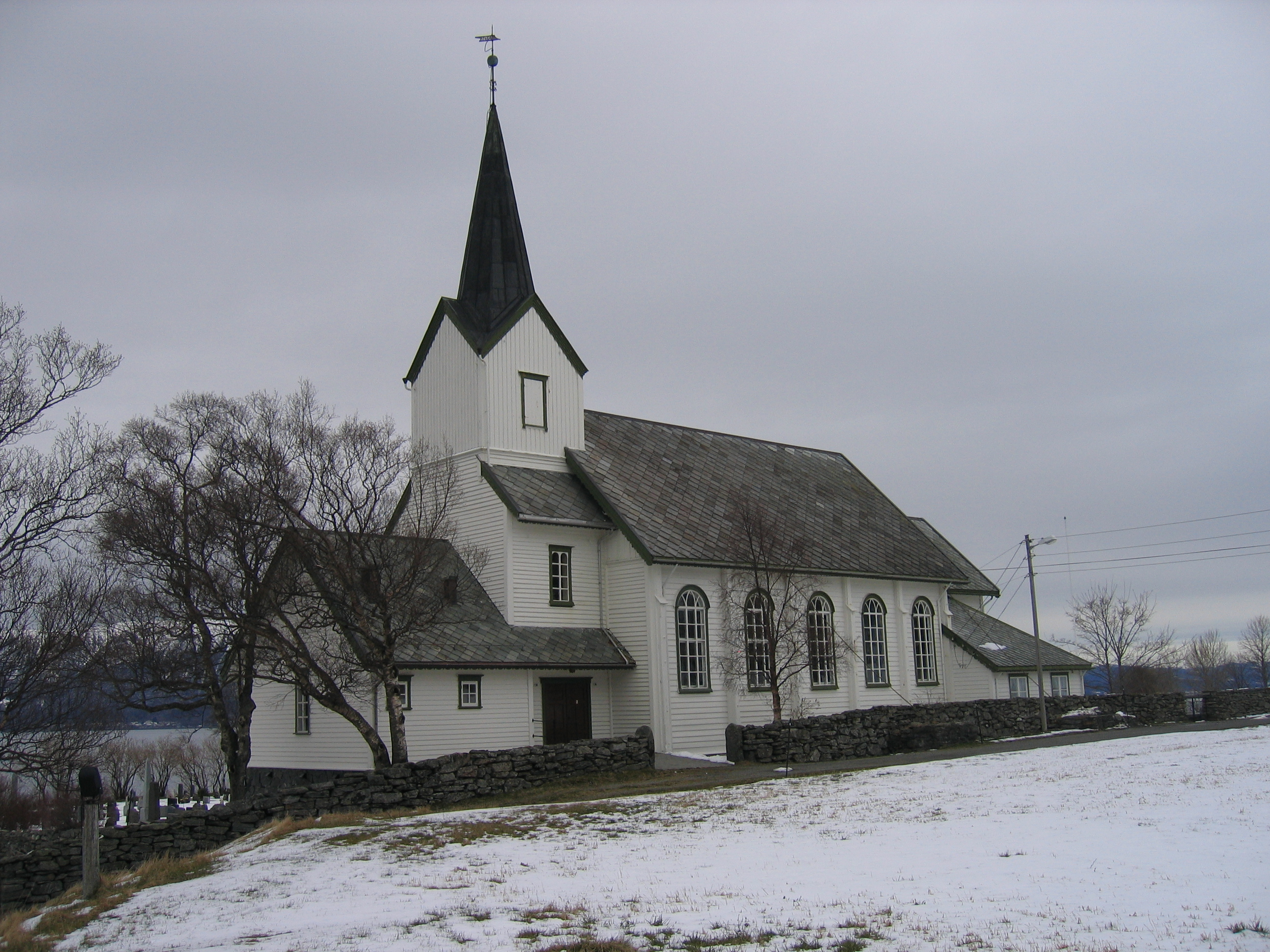

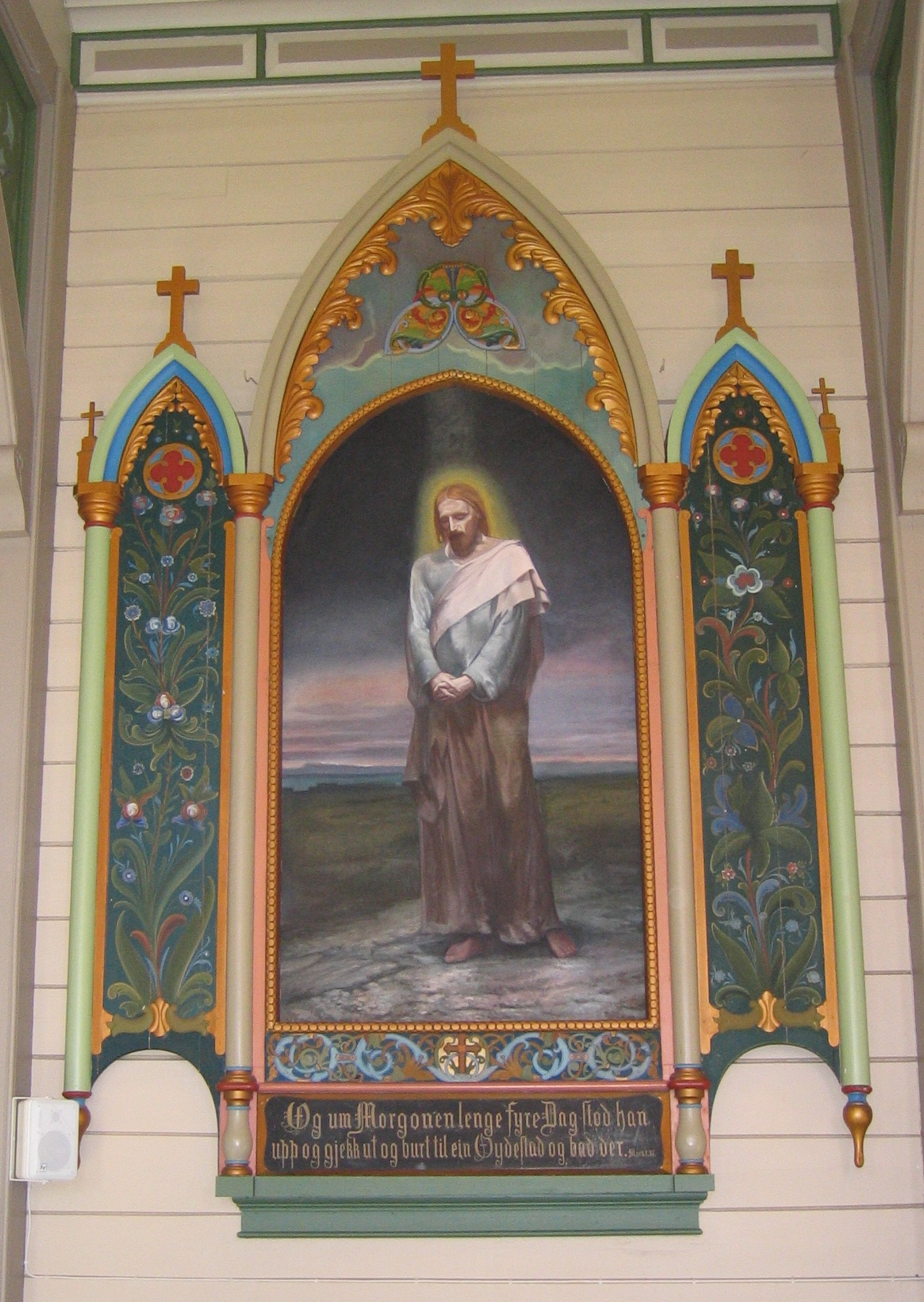

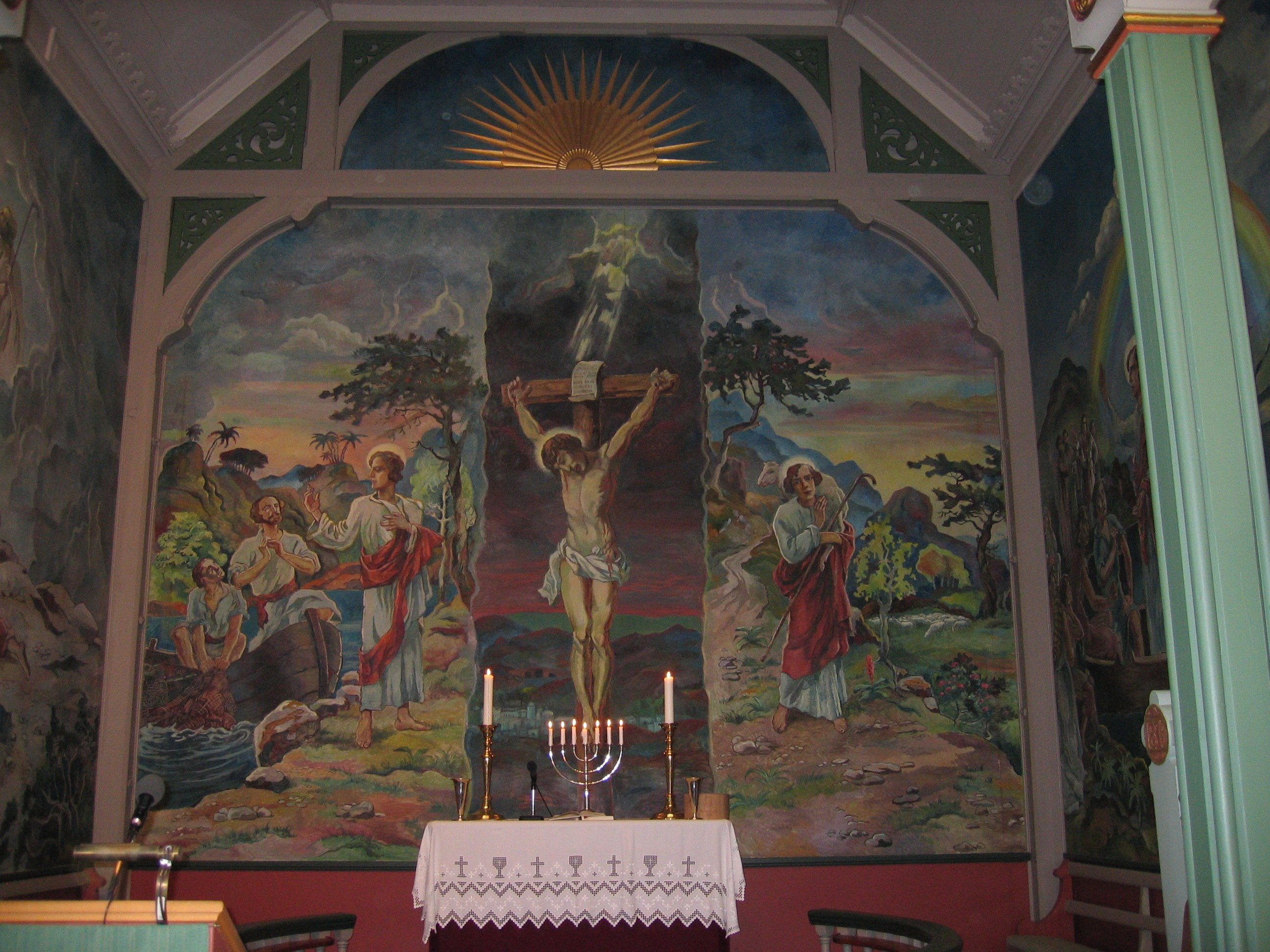

== See also ==
- List of churches in Møre
