= Ulstein Municipality =

Municipality in Møre og Romsdal, Norway

Ulstein Municipality Ulstein kommune
- Municipality
- Ulvsten herred (historic name); Ulfsten herred (historic name)
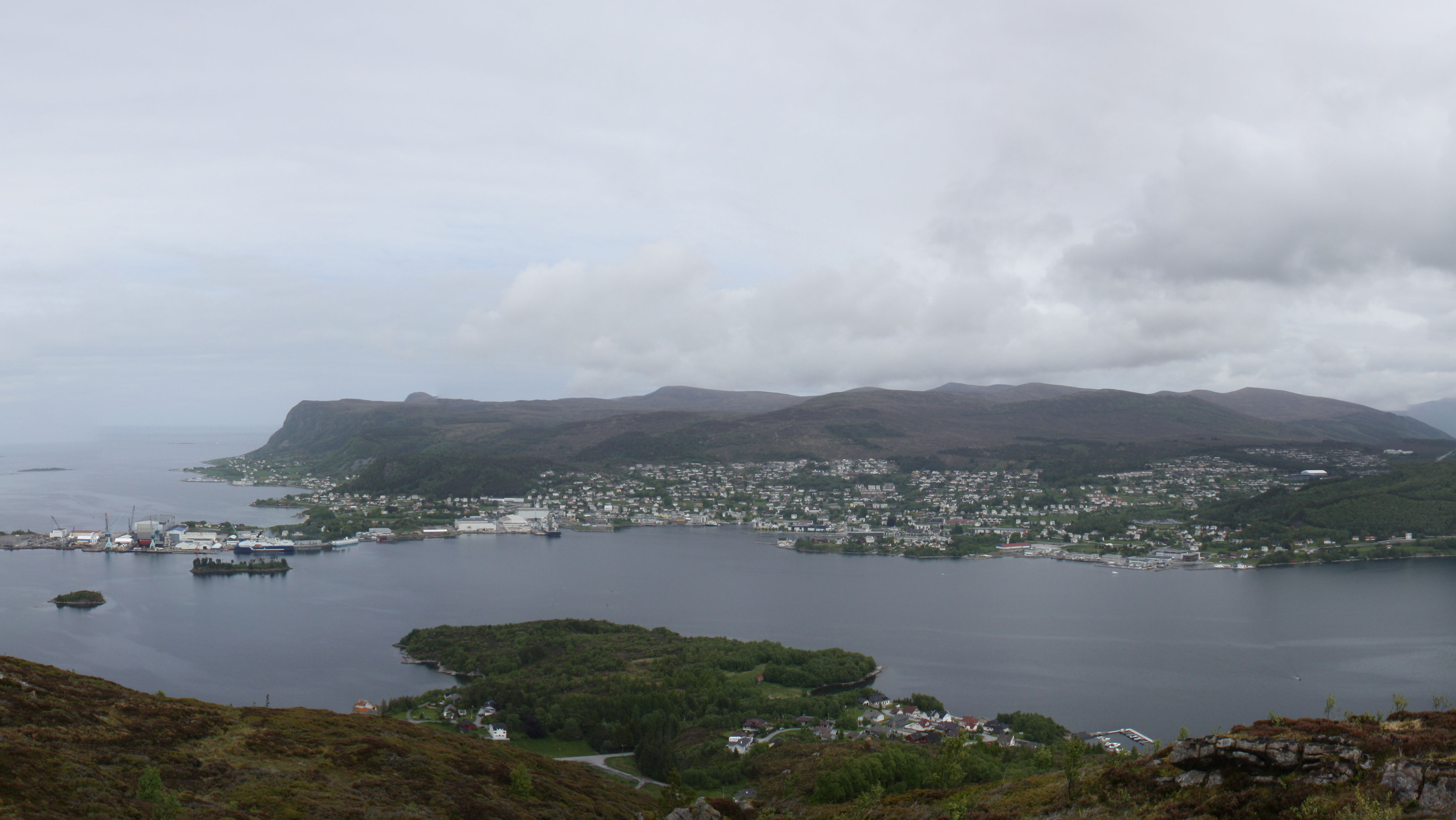
- View of Ulsteinvik

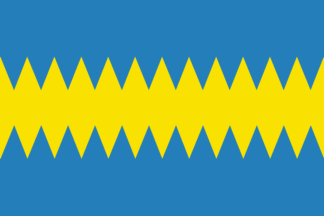
- Flag Coat of arms

- Møre og Romsdal within Norway

- Ulstein within Møre og Romsdal
- Coordinates: 62°21′23″N 05°51′14″E
- Country: Norway
- County: Møre og Romsdal
- District: Sunnmøre
- Established: 1 Jan 1838
  - Created as: Formannskapsdistrikt
- Administrative centre: Ulsteinvik

Government
  - Mayor (2023): Stian Skorgen Scheide (H)

Area
  - Total: 97.20 km^{2} (37.53 sq mi)
  - Land: 94.88 km^{2} (36.63 sq mi)
  - Water: 2.32 km^{2} (0.90 sq mi) 2.4%
  - Rank: #331 in Norway
- Highest elevation: 697.54 m (2,288.5 ft)

Population (2024)
  - Total: 8,861
  - Rank: #125 in Norway
  - Density: 91.2/km^{2} (236/sq mi)
  - Change (10 years): ▲ +9.5%
- Demonym: Ulsteining

Official language
  - Norwegian form: Nynorsk
- Time zone: UTC+01:00 (CET)
  - Summer (DST): UTC+02:00 (CEST)
- ISO 3166 code: NO-1516
- Website: Official website

Ulstein is a municipality in Møre og Romsdal county, Norway. It is part of the Sunnmøre region. The commercial and administrative centre of Ulstein is the town of Ulsteinvik. The municipality occupies the western half of the island of Hareidlandet, as well as about 30 smaller islands, four of which are populated.

Ulstein is connected to the mainland of Norway by the Eiksund Bridge (to the island of Eika) and then the Eiksund Tunnel to Ørsta Municipality on the mainland. The Grasøyane Lighthouse is located on a small island in the northwestern part of Ulstein Municipality.

The 97.2-square-kilometre (37.5 sq mi) municipality is the 331st largest by area out of the 357 municipalities in Norway. Ulstein Municipality is the 125th most populous municipality in Norway with a population of 8,861. The municipality's population density is 91.2 inhabitants per square kilometre (236/sq mi) and its population has increased by 9.5% over the previous 10-year period.

== General information ==
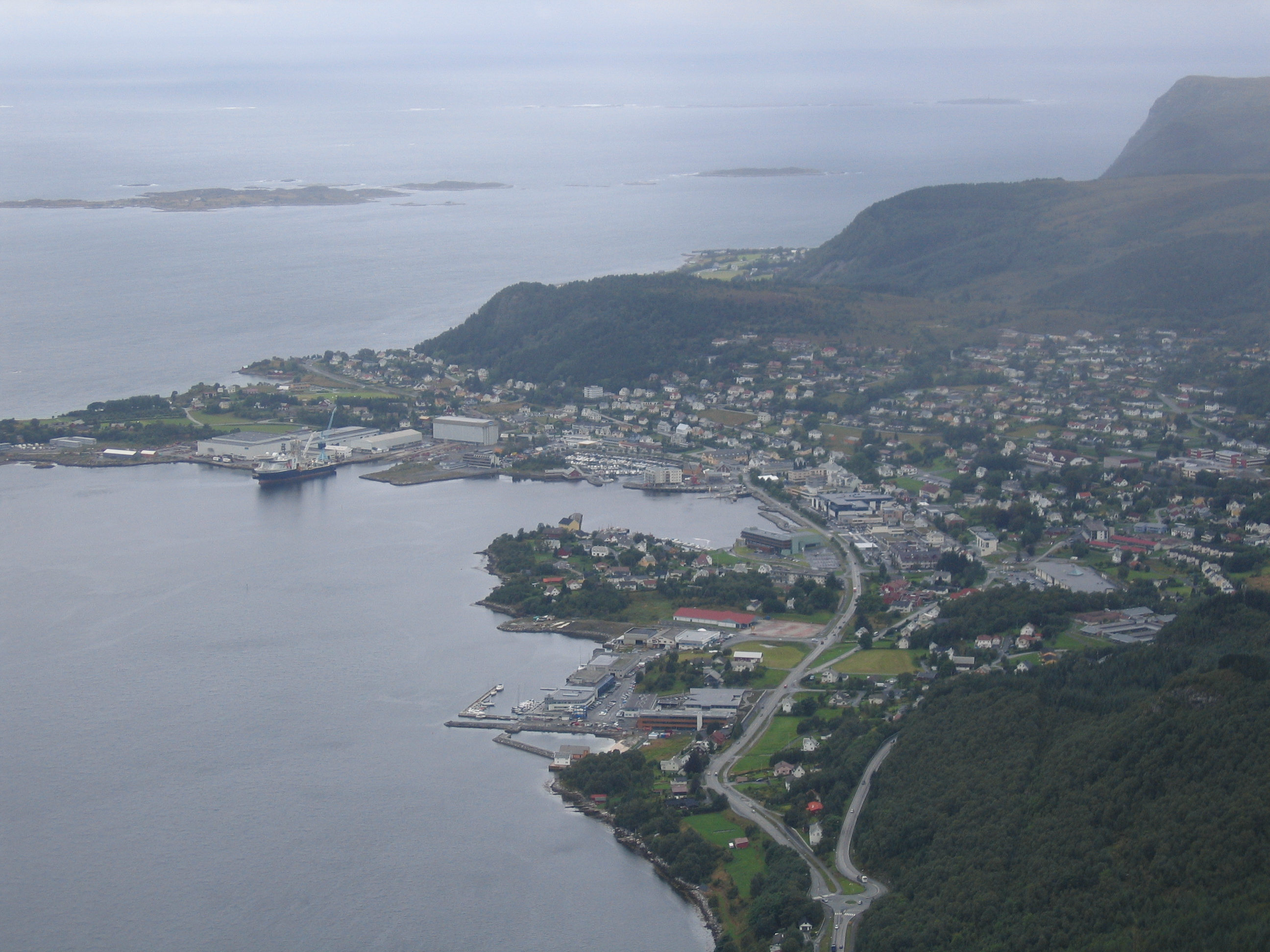
View of Ulsteinvik

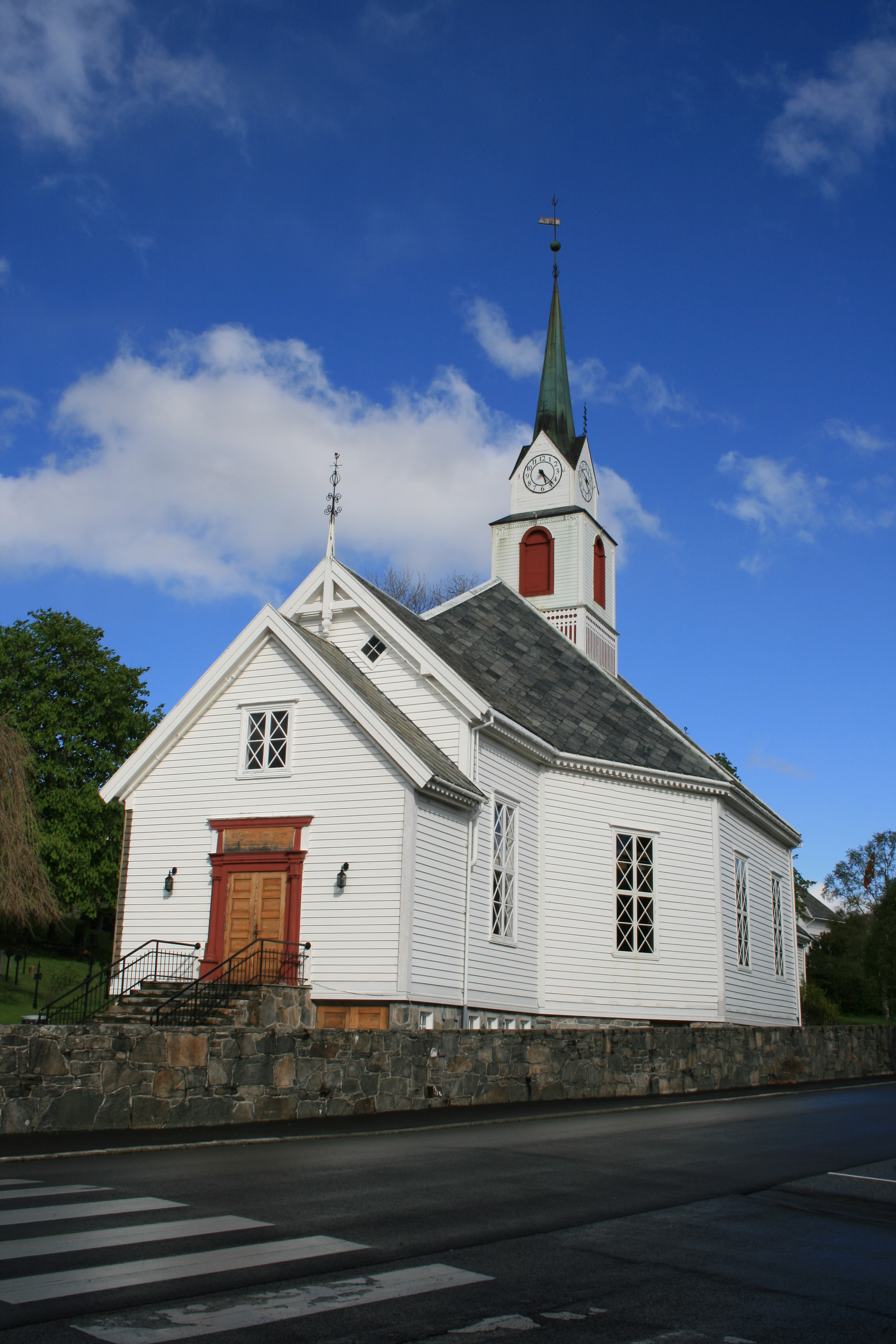
Ulstein Church

The municipality of Ulstein (originally spelled Ulfsteen) was established as a municipality on 1 January 1838 (see formannskapsdistrikt law). It originally included most of the island of Hareidlandet (except the Eiksund area) and the Vartdalsstrand area southeast of the Vartdalsfjorden on the mainland. On 1 January 1895, Ulstein Municipality was divided into two separate municipalities: the area southeast of the Vartdalsfjorden (population: 736) became the new Vartdalsstranden Municipality and the rest of the old municipality (population: 2,996) remained as a smaller Ulstein Municipality. Then on 1 January 1917, the municipality was divided again. The eastern half of the island of Hareidlandet (population: 2,310) became the new Hareid Municipality and the western half (population: 2,336) remained as a smaller Ulstein Municipality.

During the 1960s, there were many municipal mergers across Norway due to the work of the Schei Committee. On 1 January 1964, the island of Eika, the village of Eiksund, and the surrounding area (population: 222) were transferred from Herøy Municipality to Ulstein Municipality.

=== Name ===
The municipality (originally the parish) is named after the old Ulstein farm (Old Norse: Ulfsteinn) since the first Ulstein Church was built there. The first element is ulfr which means "wolf" (possibly an old name for the local river Ulva or referring to the male name Ulfr). The last element is steinn which means "stone mountain", probably referring to a small mountain (now called Ulsteinhetta) which is located behind the farm. Before 1879, the name was written Ulfsten or Ulfsteen, then between 1879 and 1888 it was spelled Ulvsten, and since 1889 it has been spelled Ulstein.

=== Coat of arms ===
The coat of arms was granted on 30 May 1986. The official blazon is "Azure, a fess indented Or" (Norwegian: På blå grunn ein gull bjelke laga med ulvetannsnitt). This means the arms have a blue field (background) and the charge is a fess (horizontal bar) with indented edges. The fess has a tincture of Or which means it is commonly colored yellow, but if it is made out of metal, then gold is used. The arms show a bar that is described as wolf-toothed, which makes the bar a canting since the municipality is named after the Ulva river (a name which sounds like the word for wolf (Norwegian: ulv). The blue colour represents the sea and the gold represents wheat. The arms were designed by Jarle Skuseth after an idea by Asbjørn Waage. The municipal flag has the same design as the coat of arms.

=== Churches ===
The Church of Norway has one parish (sokn) within Ulstein Municipality. It is part of the Søre Sunnmøre prosti (deanery) in the Diocese of Møre.

Churches in Ulstein Municipality
Parish (sokn)	Church name	Location of the church	Year built
Ulstein	Ulstein Church	Ulsteinvik	1849

== Geography ==
The municipality is located on the western part of the island of Hareidlandet, plus the island of Dimnøya and many smaller surrounding islands. The highest point in the municipality is the 697.54-metre (2,288.5 ft) tall mountain Blåtinden near the southern tip of the island of Hareidlandet. Hareid Municipality shares the only land border with Ulstein to the east. Herøy Municipality lies to the west, Volda Municipality lies to the south, and Ørsta Municipality lies to the southeast. The Vartdalsfjorden and Rovdefjorden form the southern border of Ulstein.

There are several villages throughout the municipality. The largest is the town of Ulsteinvik and others include the villages of Haddal, Flø, Eiksund, Ringstad, Sundgota, Hasund, and Varleite. The island of Dimnøya is just outside Ulsteinvik, and there are many residents there. There are also several small populated islands surrounding the main island of Hareidlandet: Eika, Vattøya, and Hatløya.

== Government ==
Ulstein Municipality is responsible for primary education (through 10th grade), outpatient health services, senior citizen services, welfare and other social services, zoning, economic development, and municipal roads and utilities. The municipality is governed by a municipal council of directly elected representatives. The mayor is indirectly elected by a vote of the municipal council. The municipality is under the jurisdiction of the Sunnmøre District Court and the Frostating Court of Appeal.

=== Municipal council ===
The municipal council (Kommunestyre) of Ulstein Municipality is made up of 25 representatives that are elected to four year terms. The tables below show the current and historical composition of the council by political party.

Ulstein kommunestyre 2023–2027
Party name (in Nynorsk)	Number of representatives
Labour Party (Arbeidarpartiet)	4
Progress Party (Framstegspartiet)	5
Conservative Party (Høgre)	6
Industry and Business Party (Industri‑ og Næringspartiet)	2
The Conservatives (Konservativt)	1
Christian Democratic Party (Kristeleg Folkeparti)	2
Centre Party (Senterpartiet)	3
Socialist Left Party (Sosialistisk Venstreparti)	1
Liberal Party (Venstre)	1
Total number of members:	25

Ulstein kommunestyre 2019–2023
Party name (in Nynorsk)	Number of representatives
Labour Party (Arbeidarpartiet)	5
Progress Party (Framstegspartiet)	6
Conservative Party (Høgre)	5
Christian Democratic Party (Kristeleg Folkeparti)	3
Centre Party (Senterpartiet)	3
Socialist Left Party (Sosialistisk Venstreparti)	1
Liberal Party (Venstre)	2
Total number of members:	25

Ulstein kommunestyre 2015–2019
Party name (in Nynorsk)	Number of representatives
Labour Party (Arbeidarpartiet)	5
Progress Party (Framstegspartiet)	6
Conservative Party (Høgre)	5
Christian Democratic Party (Kristeleg Folkeparti)	3
Centre Party (Senterpartiet)	2
Socialist Left Party (Sosialistisk Venstreparti)	1
Liberal Party (Venstre)	3
Total number of members:	25

Ulstein kommunestyre 2011–2015
Party name (in Nynorsk)	Number of representatives
Labour Party (Arbeidarpartiet)	6
Progress Party (Framstegspartiet)	4
Conservative Party (Høgre)	8
Christian Democratic Party (Kristeleg Folkeparti)	3
Centre Party (Senterpartiet)	1
Liberal Party (Venstre)	3
Total number of members:	25

Ulstein kommunestyre 2007–2011
Party name (in Nynorsk)	Number of representatives
Labour Party (Arbeidarpartiet)	7
Progress Party (Framstegspartiet)	5
Conservative Party (Høgre)	5
Christian Democratic Party (Kristeleg Folkeparti)	4
Centre Party (Senterpartiet)	2
Socialist Left Party (Sosialistisk Venstreparti)	1
Liberal Party (Venstre)	1
Total number of members:	25

Ulstein kommunestyre 2003–2007
Party name (in Nynorsk)	Number of representatives
Labour Party (Arbeidarpartiet)	6
Progress Party (Framstegspartiet)	4
Conservative Party (Høgre)	5
Christian Democratic Party (Kristeleg Folkeparti)	4
Centre Party (Senterpartiet)	2
Socialist Left Party (Sosialistisk Venstreparti)	2
Liberal Party (Venstre)	2
Total number of members:	25

Ulstein kommunestyre 1999–2003
Party name (in Nynorsk)	Number of representatives
Labour Party (Arbeidarpartiet)	5
Progress Party (Framstegspartiet)	2
Conservative Party (Høgre)	8
Christian Democratic Party (Kristeleg Folkeparti)	5
Centre Party (Senterpartiet)	2
Socialist Left Party (Sosialistisk Venstreparti)	1
Liberal Party (Venstre)	2
Total number of members:	25

Ulstein kommunestyre 1995–1999
Party name (in Nynorsk)	Number of representatives
Labour Party (Arbeidarpartiet)	5
Progress Party (Framstegspartiet)	2
Conservative Party (Høgre)	6
Christian Democratic Party (Kristeleg Folkeparti)	6
Centre Party (Senterpartiet)	4
Socialist Left Party (Sosialistisk Venstreparti)	1
Liberal Party (Venstre)	1
Total number of members:	25

Ulstein kommunestyre 1991–1995
Party name (in Nynorsk)	Number of representatives
Labour Party (Arbeidarpartiet)	6
Progress Party (Framstegspartiet)	2
Conservative Party (Høgre)	5
Christian Democratic Party (Kristeleg Folkeparti)	5
Centre Party (Senterpartiet)	3
Socialist Left Party (Sosialistisk Venstreparti)	2
Liberal Party (Venstre)	2
Total number of members:	25

Ulstein kommunestyre 1987–1991
Party name (in Nynorsk)	Number of representatives
Labour Party (Arbeidarpartiet)	5
Progress Party (Framstegspartiet)	1
Conservative Party (Høgre)	8
Christian Democratic Party (Kristeleg Folkeparti)	5
Centre Party (Senterpartiet)	2
Socialist Left Party (Sosialistisk Venstreparti)	1
Liberal Party (Venstre)	3
Total number of members:	25

Ulstein kommunestyre 1983–1987
Party name (in Nynorsk)	Number of representatives
Labour Party (Arbeidarpartiet)	5
Conservative Party (Høgre)	8
Christian Democratic Party (Kristeleg Folkeparti)	6
Centre Party (Senterpartiet)	3
Socialist Left Party (Sosialistisk Venstreparti)	1
Liberal Party (Venstre)	2
Total number of members:	25

Ulstein kommunestyre 1979–1983
Party name (in Nynorsk)	Number of representatives
Labour Party (Arbeidarpartiet)	4
Conservative Party (Høgre)	6
Christian Democratic Party (Kristeleg Folkeparti)	7
Centre Party (Senterpartiet)	5
Liberal Party (Venstre)	3
Total number of members:	25

Ulstein kommunestyre 1975–1979
Party name (in Nynorsk)	Number of representatives
Labour Party (Arbeidarpartiet)	4
Conservative Party (Høgre)	4
Christian Democratic Party (Kristeleg Folkeparti)	7
New People's Party (Nye Folkepartiet)	1
Centre Party (Senterpartiet)	6
Liberal Party (Venstre)	2
Non-party common list (Upolitisk Samlingsliste)	1
Total number of members:	25

Ulstein kommunestyre 1971–1975
Party name (in Nynorsk)	Number of representatives
Labour Party (Arbeidarpartiet)	5
Conservative Party (Høgre)	3
Christian Democratic Party (Kristeleg Folkeparti)	6
Centre Party (Senterpartiet)	5
Liberal Party (Venstre)	4
Local List(s) (Lokale lister)	2
Total number of members:	25

Ulstein kommunestyre 1967–1971
Party name (in Nynorsk)	Number of representatives
Labour Party (Arbeidarpartiet)	6
Conservative Party (Høgre)	3
Christian Democratic Party (Kristeleg Folkeparti)	6
Centre Party (Senterpartiet)	4
Liberal Party (Venstre)	6
Total number of members:	25

Ulstein kommunestyre 1963–1967
Party name (in Nynorsk)	Number of representatives
Labour Party (Arbeidarpartiet)	5
Conservative Party (Høgre)	5
Christian Democratic Party (Kristeleg Folkeparti)	6
Centre Party (Senterpartiet)	4
Liberal Party (Venstre)	5
Total number of members:	25

Ulstein heradsstyre 1959–1963
Party name (in Nynorsk)	Number of representatives
Labour Party (Arbeidarpartiet)	2
Conservative Party (Høgre)	4
Christian Democratic Party (Kristeleg Folkeparti)	4
Centre Party (Senterpartiet)	2
Liberal Party (Venstre)	5
Local List(s) (Lokale lister)	4
Total number of members:	21

Ulstein heradsstyre 1955–1959
Party name (in Nynorsk)	Number of representatives
Labour Party (Arbeidarpartiet)	3
Liberal Party (Venstre)	7
Local List(s) (Lokale lister)	11
Total number of members:	21

Ulstein heradsstyre 1951–1955
Party name (in Nynorsk)	Number of representatives
Labour Party (Arbeidarpartiet)	4
Local List(s) (Lokale lister)	16
Total number of members:	20

Ulstein heradsstyre 1947–1951
Party name (in Nynorsk)	Number of representatives
Labour Party (Arbeidarpartiet)	2
Local List(s) (Lokale lister)	18
Total number of members:	20

Ulstein heradsstyre 1945–1947
Party name (in Nynorsk)	Number of representatives
Labour Party (Arbeidarpartiet)	2
Local List(s) (Lokale lister)	18
Total number of members:	20

Ulstein heradsstyre 1937–1941*
Party name (in Nynorsk)	Number of representatives
Labour Party (Arbeidarpartiet)	3
Local List(s) (Lokale lister)	17
Total number of members:	20
Note: Due to the German occupation of Norway during World War II, no elections were held for new municipal councils until after the war ended in 1945.

=== Mayors ===
The mayor (Nynorsk: ordførar) of Ulstein Municipality is the political leader of the municipality and the chairperson of the municipal council. Here is a list of people who have held this position:

- 1838–1841: Andreas Hofgaard Winsnæs
- 1842–1843: Nils Toresen Nedrelid
- 1844–1845: Martinus Mortensen Overaae
- 1846–1849: Hans Nicolai Wraamann
- 1850–1853: Martinus Mortensen Overaae
- 1854–1855: Hans Nicolai Wraamann
- 1855–1855: Jon Pedersen Branda
- 1856–1859: Martinus Mortensen Overaae
- 1860–1867: Knut Guliksen Hareide
- 1868–1871: Johannes Pedersen Scheide
- 1872–1873: Elling Ellingsen Ulfsteen
- 1874–1875: Lars Hansen Hareide
- 1876–1881: Johannes Pedersen Scheide
- 1882–1883: Ole Johannessen Teigene
- 1884–1895: Martinus Kolbeinsen Bjørndal
- 1896–1897: Ole Johannessen Teigene
- 1898–1901: Martinus Kolbeinsen Bjørndal
- 1902–1904: Ole Johannessen Teigene
- 1905–1910: Hans Nilsen Rise
- 1911–1913: Arne Ingebrigtsen Grimstad
- 1914–1922: Hans B. Osnes
- 1923–1928: Knut Andreassen Strand
- 1929–1931: Sverre J. Lynge
- 1932–1934: Knut Andreassen Strand
- 1935–1945: Leif H. Saunes (V)
- 1946–1947: Knut Andreassen Strand
- 1948–1948: Martin Ulstein (V)
- 1948–1959: Knut A. Ertesvåg
- 1960–1963: Jan Remø (H)
- 1964–1967: Per A. Dimmen (H)
- 1967–1967: Peter K. Saunes (Ap)
- 1968–1975: Oskar V. Sundgot (KrF)
- 1976–1979: Olav B. Urke (KrF)
- 1979–1987: Asbjørn Flø (Sp)
- 1987–1993: Ottar Kaldhol (Ap)
- 1993–1995: Arne Walderhaug (KrF)
- 1995–2003: Jan Berset (H)
- 2003–2011: Hannelore Måseide (Ap)
- 2011–2015: Jan Berset (H)
- 2015–2023: Knut Erik Engh (FrP)
- 2023–present: Stian Skorgen Scheide (H)

== Industry ==
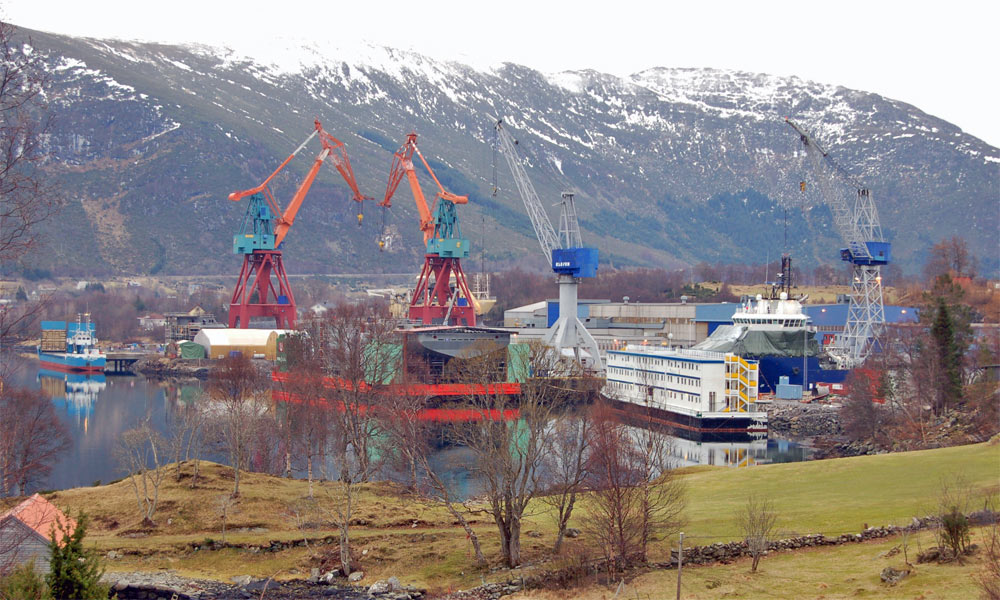
Kleven Verft

=== Maritime Cluster ===
The Headquarters of the Ulstein Group, Rolls-Royce Marine, and Kleven Verft are located in Ulstein Municipality. The maritime industry is renowned for its creativity in the ship industry, which currently employs more than 1,000 people in Ulstein.

Ulstein is known as a central community in the maritime cluster that has been created within the Sunnmøre region, Norway. Large shipyards and ship design companies are situated in Ulsteinvik. Technological innovation has played an import role in the recent history of the town. For example, the Ulstein Group has designed a new hull shape with an inverted bow called the Ulstein Group's X-Bow, examples of which are regularly docked in Ulsteinvik, outside the drydocks of Ulstein Verft.

== Notable people ==
- Ragnar Ulstein (1920–2019), a journalist, writer, and resistance member
- Martin Tore Bjørndal (1944−2015), a Norwegian diplomat in South America
- Øystein Runde (born 1979), a comics writer and comics artist

=== Sport ===
- Ole Bjørn Sundgot (born 1972), a former footballer with 270 club caps
- Arild Sundgot (born 1978), a former football striker with 312 caps with Lillestrøm SK
- Magnus Myklebust (born 1985), a football striker with 350 club caps
- Karsten Warholm (born 1996), an athlete who competes in the sprints and hurdles
