= Helge Barstad =

Norwegian politician (1928–2012)

Helge Barstad (9 May 1928 – 22 September 2012) was a Norwegian judge and politician for the Conservative Party. He was born in Vartdal Municipality.

He was mayor of Førde Municipality from 1979 to 1981. In 1981, when the Willoch's First Cabinet assumed office, he was appointed state secretary in the Ministry of Agriculture. He held this position until 1983. Outside of politics, he was a land consolidation judge. He died in September 2012.

His daughter, Hilde Barstad, became a politician too.
