= Vartdal, Møre og Romsdal =

Village in Ørsta Municipality, Norway

Vartdal Sætre Søre Vartdal
- Village
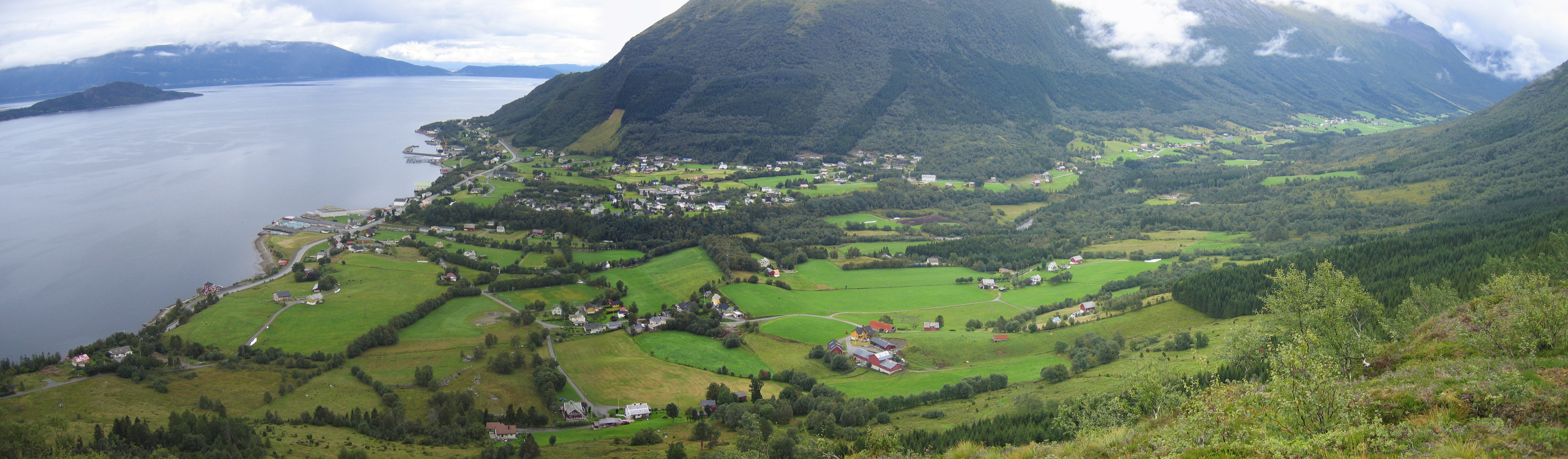
- View of the village along the Vartdalsfjorden
- Interactive map of Vartdal; Sætre
- Location within Møre og Romsdal Location within Norway
- Coordinates: 62.30047°N 6.0822°E
- Country: Norway
- Region: Western Norway
- County: Møre og Romsdal
- District: Sunnmøre
- Municipality: Ørsta

Area
  - Total: 0.75 km^{2} (0.29 sq mi)
- Elevation: 32 m (105 ft)

Population (2024)
  - Total: 400
  - Density: 533/km^{2} (1,380/sq mi)
- Time zone: UTC+01:00 (CET)
  - Summer (DST): UTC+02:00 (CEST)
- Post Code: 6170 Vartdal

Vartdal or Sætre is a village in Ørsta Municipality in Møre og Romsdal county, Norway. It is located along the shore of the Vartdalsfjorden in the Årset valley. The village sits along the European route E39 highway about 3.5 kilometres (2.2 mi) northeast of the village of Flåskjer and about 4 kilometres (2.5 mi) southwest of the village of Nordre Vartdal. The mountain Saudehornet is located about 7 kilometres (4.3 mi) south of the village.

The 0.75-square-kilometre (190-acre) village has a population (2024) of 400 and a population density of 533 inhabitants per square kilometre (1,380/sq mi).

== History ==
This village was the administrative centre of the old Vartdal Municipality from 1895–1964. The village was known as Sætre for a long time. After the merger of Vartdal Municipality with Ørsta Municipality, the village area became commonly known as Vartdal since it was the centre of the old municipality. Statistics Norway still refers to the area as Sætre.
