= Martin Tore Bjørndal =

Norwegian diplomat (1944–2015)

Martin Tore Bjørndal (27 April 1944 − 11 April 2015) was a Norwegian diplomat.

He was born in Ulsteinvik. He graduated from the University of Oslo with a cand.philol. degree in 1972, and started working in the Norwegian Ministry of Foreign Affairs in 1973. He was the Norwegian ambassador to Chile for a period before returning to the Ministry of Foreign Affairs. In 1999, he was decorated as a Knight of the Royal Norwegian Order of Merit.

In May 2004, he was appointed as Norway's ambassador to Venezuela. His responsibility was extended to Colombia in January 2005, Haiti and Ecuador from February 2005, and the Dominican Republic in March 2006. In June 2008, he was moved back to Chile. In November 2008 his Chilean ambassadorship was extended to Peru.
