= Karpf Point =

Headland in Antarctica

Karpf Point (66°54′S 64°23′W) is a point along the north side of Mill Inlet, 3 nautical miles (6 km) south of Mount Vartdal, on the east coast of Graham Land, Antarctica. It was charted by the Falkland Islands Dependencies Survey (FIDS) and photographed from the air by the Ronne Antarctic Research Expedition in 1947, and was named by the FIDS for Alois Karpf, librarian of the Kaiserliche and Konigliche Geographische Gesellschaft in Vienna and joint author of a polar bibliography.
