= Eiksund Tunnel =

Undersea road tunnel in Møre og Romsdal, Norway

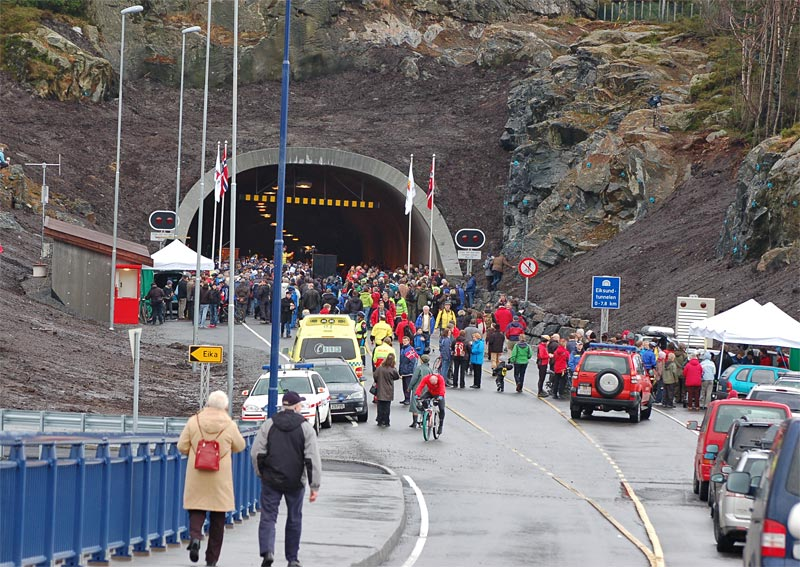
- Opening ceremony, 23 February 2008
- Interactive map of Eiksund Tunnel

Overview
- Location: Møre og Romsdal, Norway
- Coordinates: 62.2182°N 5.9862°E
- Route: Fv653

Operation
- Opened: 23 February 2008
- Operator: Statens vegvesen
- Traffic: Automotive
- Character: Passenger
- Vehicles per day: 2884

Technical
- Length: 7,765 m (25,476 ft)
- No. of lanes: 2 + 1 crawling
- Min elevation: −287 m (−942 ft)
- Width: 10 m (33 ft)
- Grade: Maximum: 9.6%

The Eiksund tunnel (Norwegian: Eiksundtunnelen) is an undersea tunnel in Møre og Romsdal county, Norway, which runs under the Vartdalsfjorden connecting the municipalities of Ørsta and Ulstein. The tunnel is 7,765 metres (25,476 ft) long and reaches a depth of 287 metres (942 ft) below sea level, and was the deepest undersea tunnel in the world until Norway's Rogaland county opened its 292 m (958 ft) deep Ryfast tunnel system in December 2019.

== Localities served ==
The tunnel was built as part of a large project including three tunnels and a bridge connecting several islands to the mainland. The bridge–tunnel complex serves the municipalities of Herøy, Sande, Ulstein, Hareid, Ørsta, and Volda, which together have over 40,000 inhabitants. The Eiksund Bridge joins Hareidlandet island and the village of Eiksund with the nearby island of Eika. The Eiksund Tunnel begins at the south end of the bridge (on Eika island) goes under the Vartdalsfjorden and connects to the mainland near the village of Ørsta.

These three structures are a part of Norwegian County Road 653 (Fv653), a highway that links Fv61 between Ulstein and Herøy to the European route E39 highway between Ørsta and Volda.

== Construction ==
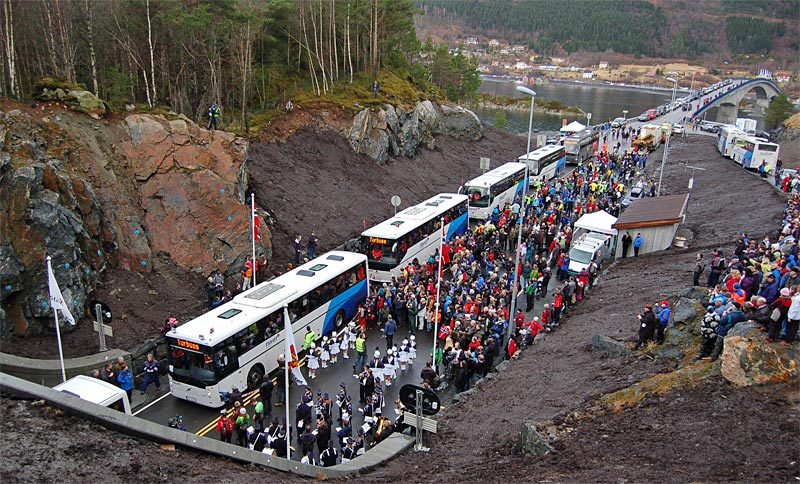
Opening ceremony, 23 February 2008

The 405-metre (1,329 ft) long Eiksund Bridge and the 1,160-metre (3,810 ft) long Helgehorn Tunnel were built along with the tunnel. The total cost of the tunnel was about 500m kr. The tunnel was originally intended to be opened to the public in July 2007, but numerous delays pushed the date back to December 2007 and then eventually to 2008. The tunnel was opened to traffic on 23 February 2008.

The Eiksund Tunnel is an undersea rock tunnel created by drilling and blasting, with 1,300 tonnes (1,300 long tons; 1,400 short tons) of explosive used. About 660,000 cubic metres (23,000,000 cu ft) of rock were removed during construction.

== Usage ==
The tunnel carries two lanes on the Ørsta side, and two lanes + one crawling lane on the Eiksund side. Prior to construction the average daily traffic through the Eiksund Tunnel was projected to be 1,000 vehicles per day (VPD). The ease of crossing the fjord, however, rapidly increased traffic to 2,200 VPD. When the tunnel was fully financed after six years and became toll-free, traffic jumped again to 2,880 VPD.

=== Incidents ===
On 28 June 2009, there was a severe accident in the tunnel, leaving five men dead. A young driver with three male passengers in their 20s was thought to have been driving at around 150–200 kilometres per hour (93–124 mph) when he hit the side of the tunnel and flipped his car over, which then struck an oncoming vehicle carrying only its driver.

== See also ==
- Extreme points of Earth
- Rogfast, a deeper Norwegian undersea tunnel whose construction was halted in 2019.
