= Eika, Møre og Romsdal =

Island in Møre og Romsdal, Norway

Eika
- Interactive map of Eika

Geography
- Location: Møre og Romsdal, Norway
- Coordinates: 62.2402°N 5.8877°E
- Area: 2.5 km^{2} (0.97 sq mi)
- Length: 3.7 km (2.3 mi)
- Width: 2 km (1.2 mi)
- Coastline: 12 km (7.5 mi)
- Highest elevation: 123 m (404 ft)
- Highest point: Eikenakken

Administration
- Norway
- County: Møre og Romsdal
- Municipality: Ulstein Municipality

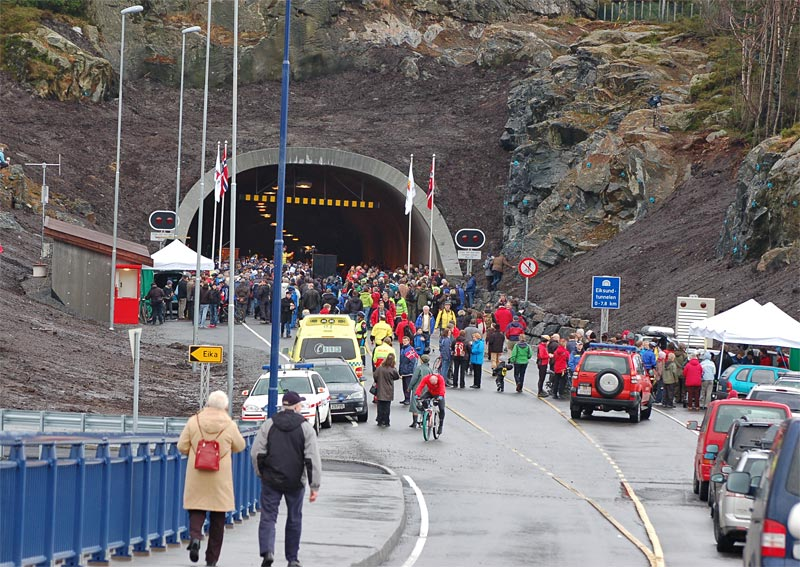
Eiksund Tunnel

Eika is an island in the southern part of Ulstein Municipality in Møre og Romsdal county, Norway. It is connected to the village of Eiksund on the island of Hareidlandet by the Eiksund Bridge. Eika is connected to the mainland of Norway by the Eiksund Tunnel.

The 2.5-square-kilometre (0.97 sq mi) island is about 3.7 kilometres (2.3 mi) long and about 2 kilometres (1.2 mi) wide. It is located about 200 metres (660 ft) south of the large island of Hareidlandet. There are only a few permanent residents on the island. The island was part of Herøy Municipality until 1964.

== See also ==
- List of islands of Norway
