= Mount Vartdal =

Mountain in Graham Land, Antarctica

Coordinates: 66°51′S 64°23′W

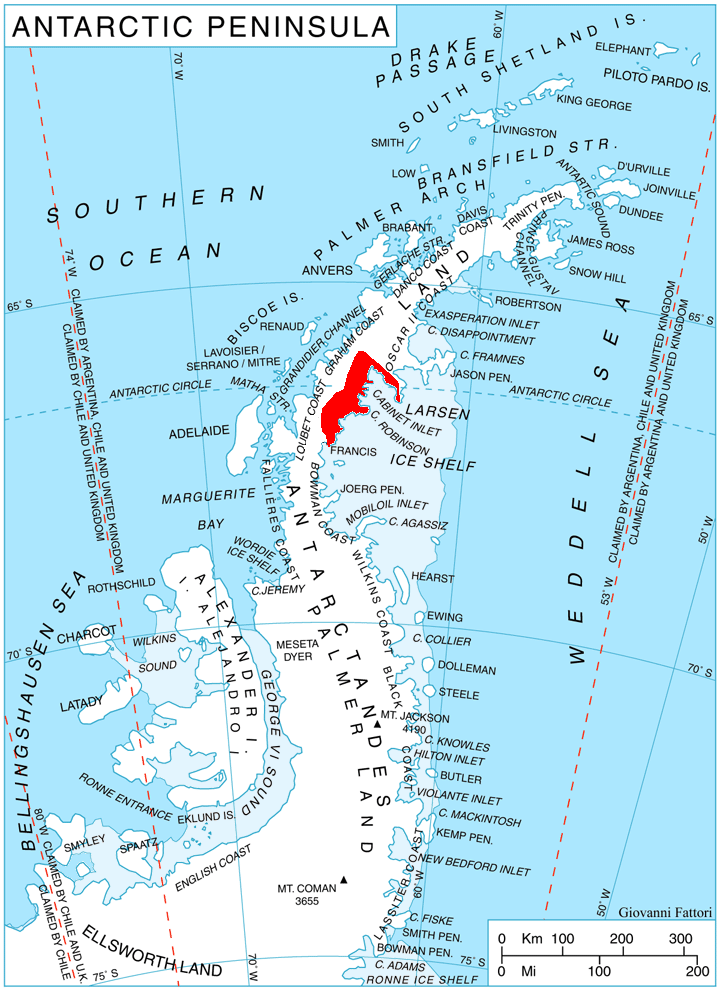
Location of Foyn Coast on Antarctic Peninsula.

Mount Vartdal is a 1,505 m tall snow-capped peak surmounting and forming part of the plateau escarpment along the east coast of Graham Land. It is situated 4 nautical miles (7 km) northeast of Karpf Point on the north side of Mill Inlet. It was charted by the Falkland Islands Dependencies Survey (FIDS) in 1947 and named for Hroar Vartdal, a Norwegian polar bibliographer. This feature was photographed from the air during 1947 by the Ronne Antarctic Research Expedition (RARE) under Ronne.
