= Hareidlandet =

Island in Møre og Romsdal, Norway

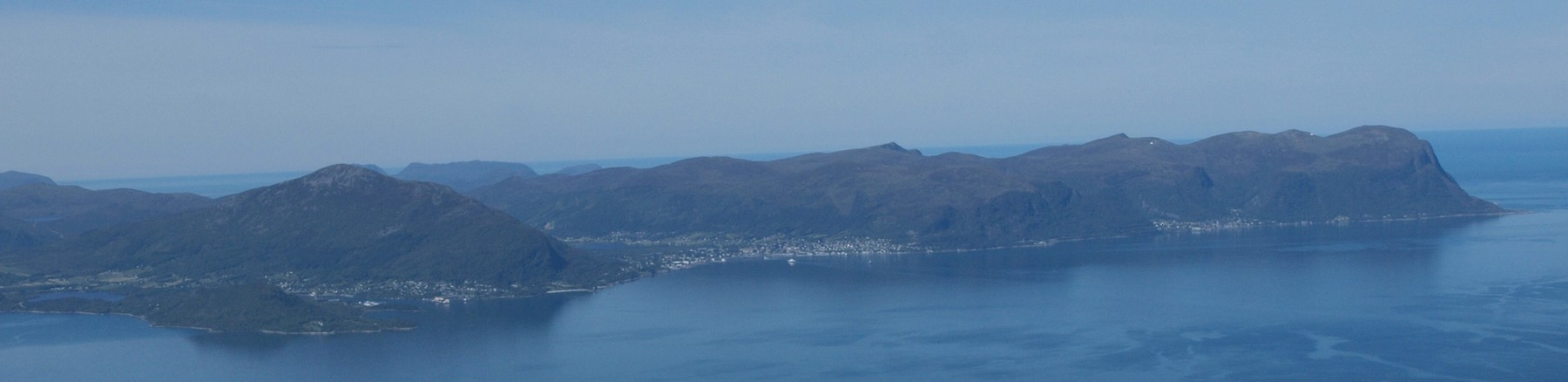
- View of the island (looking west)
- Interactive map of Hareidlandet

Geography
- Location: Møre og Romsdal, Norway
- Coordinates: 62.4076°N 5.9389°E
- Area: 165 km^{2} (64 sq mi)
- Length: 20 km (12 mi)
- Width: 15 km (9.3 mi)
- Highest elevation: 697 m (2287 ft)
- Highest point: Blåtind

Administration
- Norway
- County: Møre og Romsdal
- Municipality: Hareid Municipality and Ulstein Municipality

Demographics
- Population: 13,030 (2015)
- Pop. density: 79/km^{2} (205/sq mi)

Hareidlandet is an island in Møre og Romsdal county, Norway. The island is divided between Hareid Municipality and Ulstein Municipality. The 165-square-kilometre (64 sq mi) island has a population of 13,683 (as of 2022).

The island is home to one town, Ulsteinvik, and several larger villages: Eiksund, Haddal, Hasund, Brandal, Hareid, and Hjørungavåg. The island is connected to the mainland to the south via the Eiksund Bridge to the island of Eika which in turn is connected to the mainland through the Eiksund Tunnel. On the west side, the island has bridge connections to the islands of Dimnøya and Gurskøya. On the east side, there is a ferry connection to the island of Sula.

== Name ==
The Old Norse name of the island was feminine Höð (modern har- from the Old Norse genitive haðar). The etymology of the name is unknown; a suggested meaning of "lake" is speculative, the connection with höð, "battle", is spurious.

== History ==
The island is mentioned by Snorri in his reports about the Battle of Hjörungavágr (now Hjørungavåg) in 986, where Haakon Jarl defeated Bue Digre and the Jomsvikings. Snorri refers to the island as Höð.

The Old Norse name of the island was adopted by the local association football team of the municipality of Ulstein, IL Hødd, when the team was established in 1919.

== See also ==
- List of islands of Norway
