= Ulsteinvik =

Town in Møre og Romsdal, Norway

- Town/City
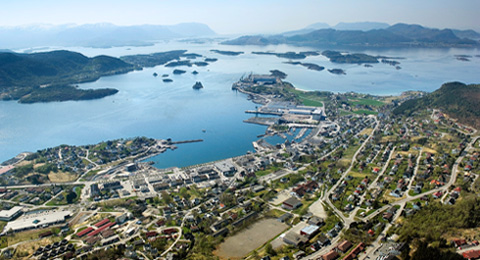
- View of the town (looking west)
- Interactive map of Ulsteinvik
- Location within Møre og Romsdal Location within Norway
- Coordinates: 62.3432°N 5.8487°E
- Country: Norway
- Region: Western Norway
- County: Møre og Romsdal
- District: Sunnmøre
- Municipality: Ulstein Municipality
- Established as
- Town (By): 1 July 2000

Area
  - Total: 3.93 km^{2} (1.52 sq mi)
- Elevation: 5 m (16 ft)

Population (2024)
  - Total: 6,208
  - Density: 1,580/km^{2} (4,100/sq mi)
- Demonyms: Ulsteinvikar; Ulsteinviker
- Time zone: UTC+01:00 (CET)
  - Summer (DST): UTC+02:00 (CEST)
- Post Code: 6065 Ulsteinvik

Ulsteinvik is a town in Ulstein Municipality in Møre og Romsdal county, Norway. The town is the commercial and administrative centre of the municipality and as such, Ulsteinvik contains 74% of the municipal population. The 3.93-square-kilometre (970-acre) town has a population (2024) of 6,208 and a population density of 1,580 inhabitants per square kilometre (4,100/sq mi).

The town of Ulsteinvik is located on the west side of the island of Hareidlandet, about 23 kilometres (14 mi) southwest of the city of Ålesund. Ulstein Church is located in the town, serving the population of the whole municipality. Ulsteinvik received town status on 1 July 2000.

== Economy ==
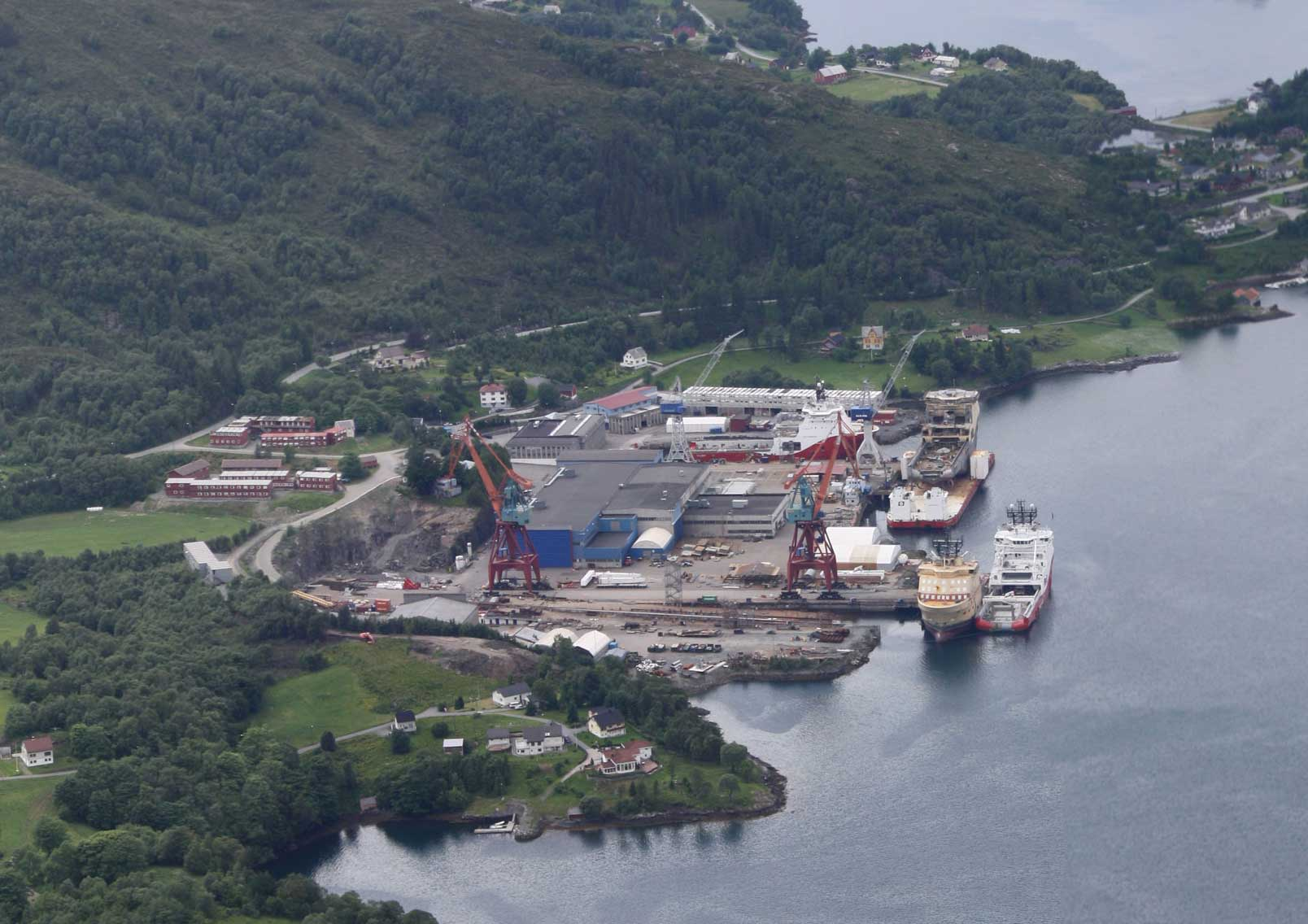
View of Kleven Verft

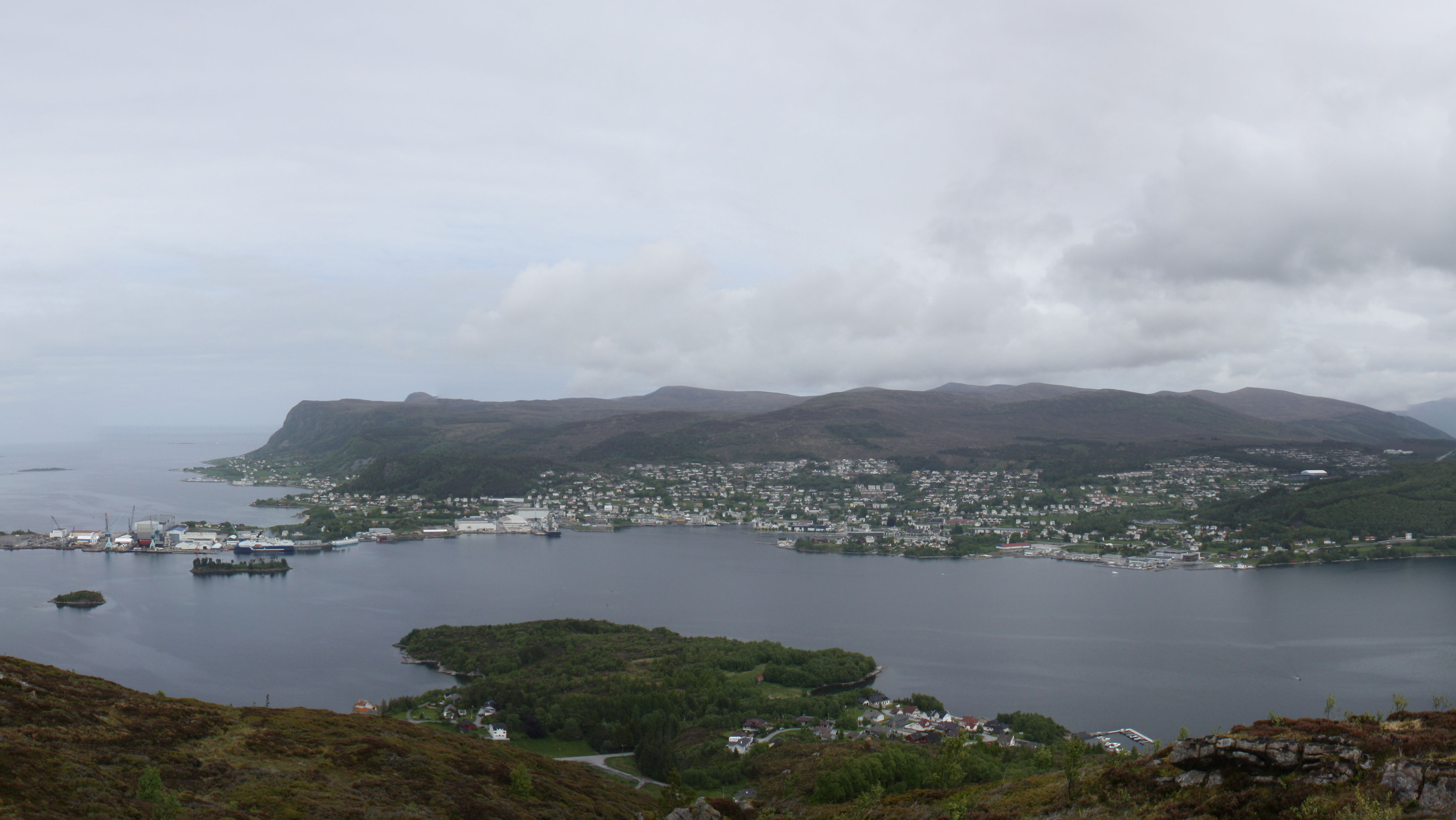
View of the town, looking northeast

The town is built in a natural harbour (in fact, the town's name means "Ulstein cove" or "Ulstein inlet"), and has an industry driven largely by shipbuilding, with two major shipyards: Ulstein Verft and Kleven Verft.

The Ulstein Group includes the Ulstein Verft shipyard and a growing number of other marine-related companies, the largest of which are Ulstein Power & Control AS and Ulstein Design & Solutions AS. The town has dozens of other maritime-related firms of all sizes, including the global head office of Rolls-Royce plc's marine division. The strength of this industry through the middle of the first decade of the 21st century has led to significant expansion and new construction, both residential and commercial.

In 2012, Ulsteinvik was the winner of the most attractive town in Norway.

== Culture and sports ==
The Sjøborg theatre, on Ulsteinvik's waterfront, has both film and live theatre venues. It shows a mixture of "global" and Norwegian feature films (3-5 different films at a time over 10-12 showings per week). In addition, it welcomes a mixture of local and touring live acts, including big band, operatic revues, English- and Norwegian-language dramatic productions and stand-up comedy.

Ulsteinvik is the home of IL Hødd, a multi-sport club that includes a Norwegian First Division (as of 2011) football team. The team has a large local following, and generates strong attendance at their stadium, Høddvoll. Hødd also offers several other sports, including handball and rhythmic gymnastics. In 2012, Hødd became national cup champions of Norway, beating Tromsø IL in the final of the 2012 Norwegian Football Cup in the Ullevaal Stadion in Oslo. In addition, Ulsteinvik is the home of smaller clubs in each of basketball and rugby union (Sunnmøre Rugby). It is also the hometown of men's 400m hurdles world record holder and Olympic champion Karsten Warholm, as well as Norway's first-choice football goalkeeper in the Beijing Olympics, Erika Skarbø.

Ulsteinvik is the birthplace of the underground cartoonist Øystein Runde.

== Media ==
Ulsteinvik is the headquarters of the local subscription-based newspaper Vikebladet Vestposten (commonly known by only the first name), formed by a 1989 merger of two previously-existing newspapers (Vikebladet & Vestposten). The community is also served by the free regional weekly RegionAvisa and the Ålesund-based daily Sunnmørsposten.

== Transport ==
Norwegian county road Fv 61 runs along the south edge of the town centre, and is the major route connecting Ulsteinvik to points northeast (Hareid and Sula, with connections to Ålesund) and south (the villages of Eiksund and Haddal as well as the municipalities of Herøy Municipality, Sande, and others). Since its completion in 2008, the Eiksund Tunnel, the world's deepest undersea tunnel, connects Ulsteinvik by road to the mainland via Fv 653.

Ulsteinvik is served by one bus company, Vy Buss, with the express route directly to Oslo operated under its Vy express brand.

Ulsteinvik is 30 kilometres (19 mi) from the Ørsta–Volda Airport, Hovden, which has several-daily flights to Oslo Airport, Gardermoen and Sogndal Airport, Haukåsen. It is also served by Ålesund Airport, Vigra, 60 kilometres (37 mi) away, which has a broader selection of national and international flights.

== See also ==
- List of towns and cities in Norway
