= Vartdalsfjorden =

Fjord in Sunnmøre, Norway

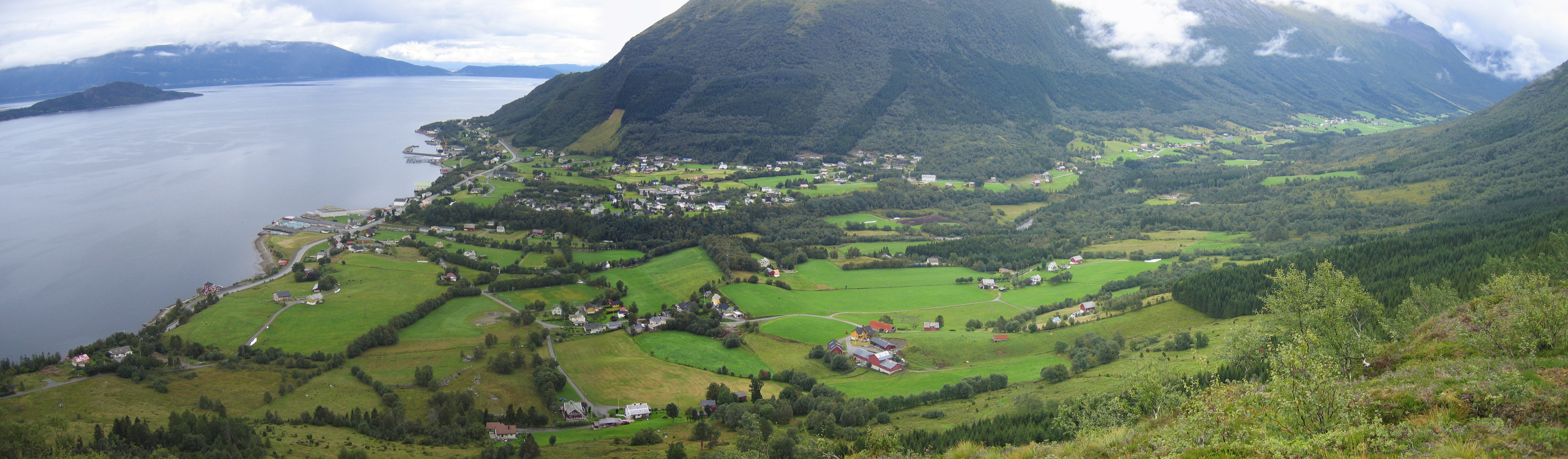
- View of Vartdal and the Vartdalsfjorden
- Interactive map of the fjord
- Location: Møre og Romsdal county, Norway
- Coordinates: 62.3120°N 6.0565°E
- Type: Fjord
- Primary inflows: Rovdefjorden, Voldsfjorden, Ørstafjorden
- Primary outflows: Storfjorden, Sulafjorden
- Basin countries: Norway
- Max. length: 20 kilometres (12 mi)
- Max. width: 3 kilometres (1.9 mi)
- Max. depth: 365 metres (1,198 ft)
- Islands: Eika

Vartdalsfjorden is a fjord (more technically, a strait) in Møre og Romsdal county, Norway. It begins at the Storfjorden and Sulafjorden in the northeast and flows through Hareid Municipality and Ulstein Municipality on the northern shore of the fjord and through Ørsta Municipality and Volda Municipality on the southern shore.

The 20-kilometre (12 mi) long fjord has one road crossing, the Eiksund Tunnel. The deepest part of the fjord reaches 365 metres (1,198 ft) below sea level. The village of Vartdal lies on the southern shore of the fjord in Ørsta Municipality.

== History ==
From 1895 until 1964, the southern banks of the fjord were part of the old Vartdal Municipality.

== See also ==
- List of Norwegian fjords
