= Sunnmøre =

Traditional district in Møre og Romsdal, Norway

Coordinates: 62°9′N 6°20′E

Sunnmøre (highlighted in red) within Møre og Romsdal

Sunnmøre (Urban East Norwegian: [ˈsʉ̂nːmøːrə], lit. 'South-Møre') is the southernmost traditional district of the western Norwegian county of Møre og Romsdal. Its main city is Ålesund. The region comprises the municipalities (Norwegian: kommuner) of Fjord, Giske, Hareid, Herøy, Sande, Haram, Stranda Municipality, Sula, Sykkylven, Ulstein, Vanylven, Volda, Ørsta, and Ålesund.

Though it is one of the three traditional districts in Møre og Romsdal, Sunnmøre is home to more than half the population of the county—with 141,755 residents, or about 54% of the population of the county. The district is made up of mainland as well as several large islands such as Gurskøy and Hareidlandet, plus many small islands.

While Sunnmøre has no formal administration, many national organizations chose to have separate divisions for Sunnmøre. For example, the Football Association of Norway has a separate Regional Association for Sunnmøre, separate from Nordmøre and Romsdal. This is also true for the national police.

All municipalities in Sunnmøre have adopted Nynorsk as their form of the Norwegian language, with the exception of Ålesund Municipality, which has declared itself to be "neutral", though almost all of the education in Ålesund is conducted using Bokmål.

There are many local newspapers throughout Sunnmøre, as well as one that aims to cover the entire region, published from Ålesund, called Sunnmørsposten.

== Urban areas ==
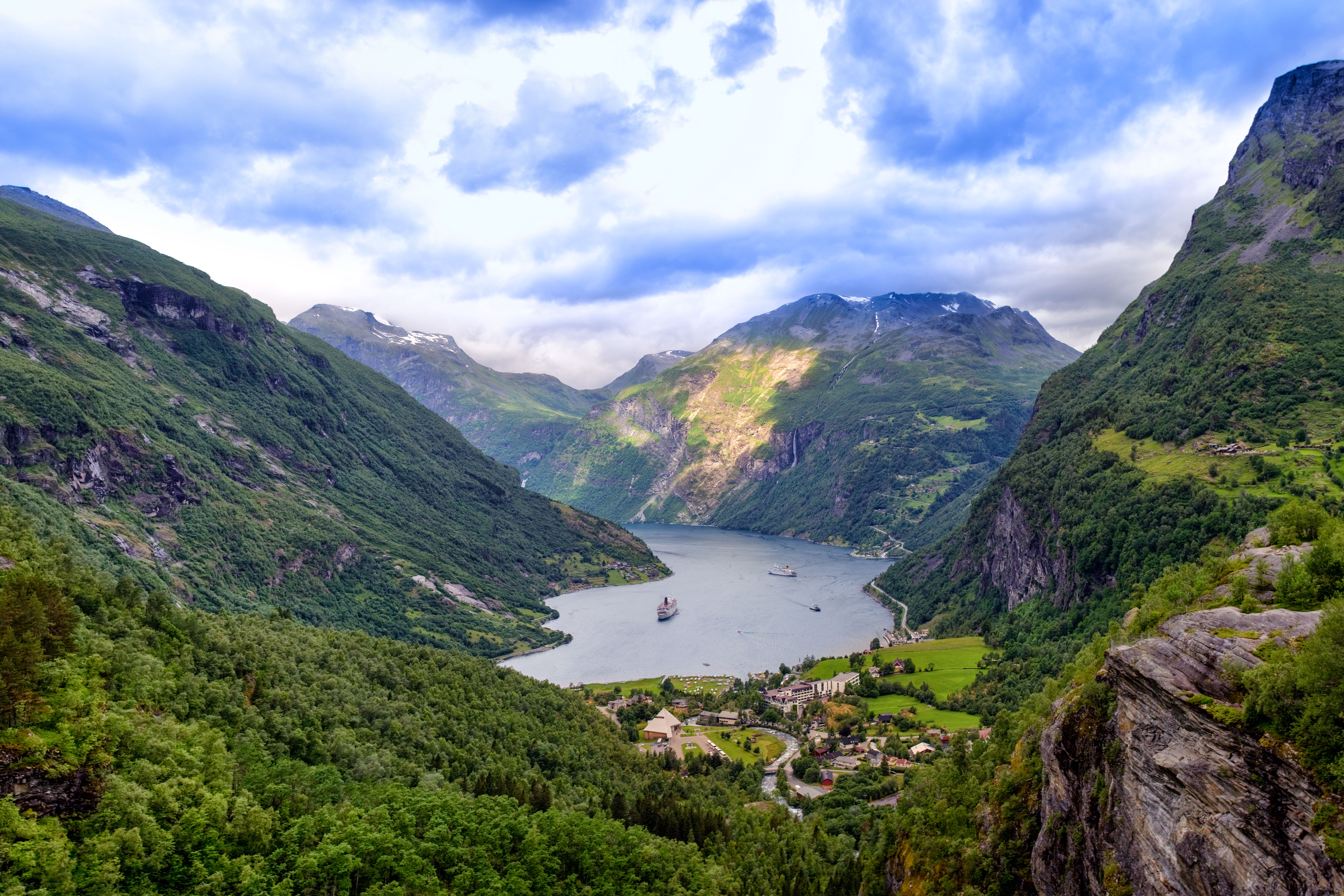
The Geiranger Fjord is listed as a UNESCO World Heritage Site.

The major urban centres (by urban population) of Sunnmøre are:

Rank	Town/Village	Municipality	Population (2024)
1	Ålesund	Ålesund Municipality and Sula Municipality	55,684
2	Ørsta	Ørsta Municipality	7,609
3	Volda	Volda Municipality	7,143
4	Ulsteinvik	Ulstein Municipality	6,208
5	Sykkylven	Sykkylven Municipality	4,452
6	Nordstrand	Giske Municipality	4,317
7	Hareid	Hareid Municipality	3,662
8	Fosnavåg	Herøy Municipality	3,626
9	Stranda	Stranda Municipality	2,571
10	Skodje	Ålesund Municipality	2,544
11	Vatne	Haram Municipality	2,439
12	Brattvåg	Haram Municipality	2,437

== See also ==
- Ny-Sunnmøre
- Romsdal
- Nordmøre
