= Søre Sunnmøre District Court =

Former district court in Volda, Norway

- Søre Sunnmøre tingrett
- 62.147106°N 6.073846°E
- Established: 1798
- Dissolved: 26 April 2021
- Jurisdiction: Southern Sunnmøre
- Location: Volda, Norway
- Coordinates: 62.147106°N 6.073846°E
- Appeals to: Frostating Court of Appeal
- Website: Official website

Chief Judge (Sørenskriver)
- Currently: Elisabeth Wiik

Søre Sunnmøre District Court (Norwegian: Søre Sunnmøre tingrett) was a district court in Møre og Romsdal county, Norway. The court was based in the village of Volda. The court existed until 2021. It had jurisdiction over southern part of the county which included the municipalities of Herøy, Sande, Vanylven, Volda, and Ørsta. Cases from this court could be appealed to Frostating Court of Appeal. The court was led by the chief judge (Sorenskriver) Elisabeth Wiik. This court employed a chief judge, two other judges, and three prosecutors.

The court was a court of first instance. Its judicial duties were mainly to settle criminal cases and to resolve civil litigation as well as bankruptcy. The administration and registration tasks of the court included death registration, issuing certain certificates, performing duties of a notary public, and officiating civil wedding ceremonies. Cases from this court were heard by a combination of professional judges and lay judges.

== History ==
In 1798, the old Sunnmøre district court was divided into Søre Sunnmøre District Court (based in Volda) and Nordre Sunnmøre District Court (based in Ålesund). The name of the northern court was later changed to simply Sunnmøre District Court. In 1967, Ulstein Municipality and Hareid Municipality were transferred from the Søre Sunnmøre District Court to the Sunnmøre District Court. On 26 April 2021, this court was merged with the Sunnmøre District Court, Romsdal District Court, and Nordmøre District Court to create the new Møre og Romsdal District Court.
