= Møre og Romsdal District Court =

Former district court in Norway

- Møre og Romsdal tingrett
- 62°28′31″N 6°09′11″E
- Established: 26 April 2021
- Dissolved: 9 June 2025
- Jurisdiction: Møre og Romsdal, Norway
- Location: Ålesund, Molde, and Kristiansund
- Coordinates: 62°28′31″N 6°09′11″E
- Appeals to: Frostating Court of Appeal
- Website: Official website

Møre og Romsdal District Court (Norwegian: Møre og Romsdal tingrett) was a district court located in Møre og Romsdal county, Norway. This court was based at four different courthouses which were located in Volda, Ålesund, Molde, and Kristiansund. The court was subordinate to the Frostating Court of Appeal. The court served the whole county which included 26 municipalities.

- The courthouse in Volda accepted cases from the municipalities of Herøy, Sande, Vanylven, Volda, and Ørsta.
- The courthouse in Ålesund accepted cases from the municipalities of Fjord, Giske, Haram, Hareid, Stranda, Sykkylven, Sula, Ulstein, and Ålesund.
- The courthouse in Molde accepts cases from the municipalities of Aukra, Hustadvika, Molde, Rauma, and Vestnes.
- The courthouse in Kristiansund accepts cases from the municipalities of Aure, Averøy, Gjemnes, Kristiansund, Smøla, Sunndal, Surnadal, and Tingvoll.

The court was a court of first instance. Its judicial duties were mainly to settle criminal cases and to resolve civil litigation as well as bankruptcy. The administration and registration tasks of the court included death registration, issuing certain certificates, performing duties of a notary public, and officiating civil wedding ceremonies. Cases from this court were heard by a combination of professional judges and lay judges.

== History ==
This court was established on 26 April 2021 after the old Nordmøre District Court, Romsdal District Court, Sunnmøre District Court, and Søre Sunnmøre District Court were all merged into one court. The new district court system continue to use the courthouses from the predecessor courts. On 10 June 2025, the court was dissolved and divided into two new courts: Sunnmøre District Court and Nordmøre og Romsdal District Court.
