= Sulafjorden =

Fjord in Møre og Romsdal, Norway

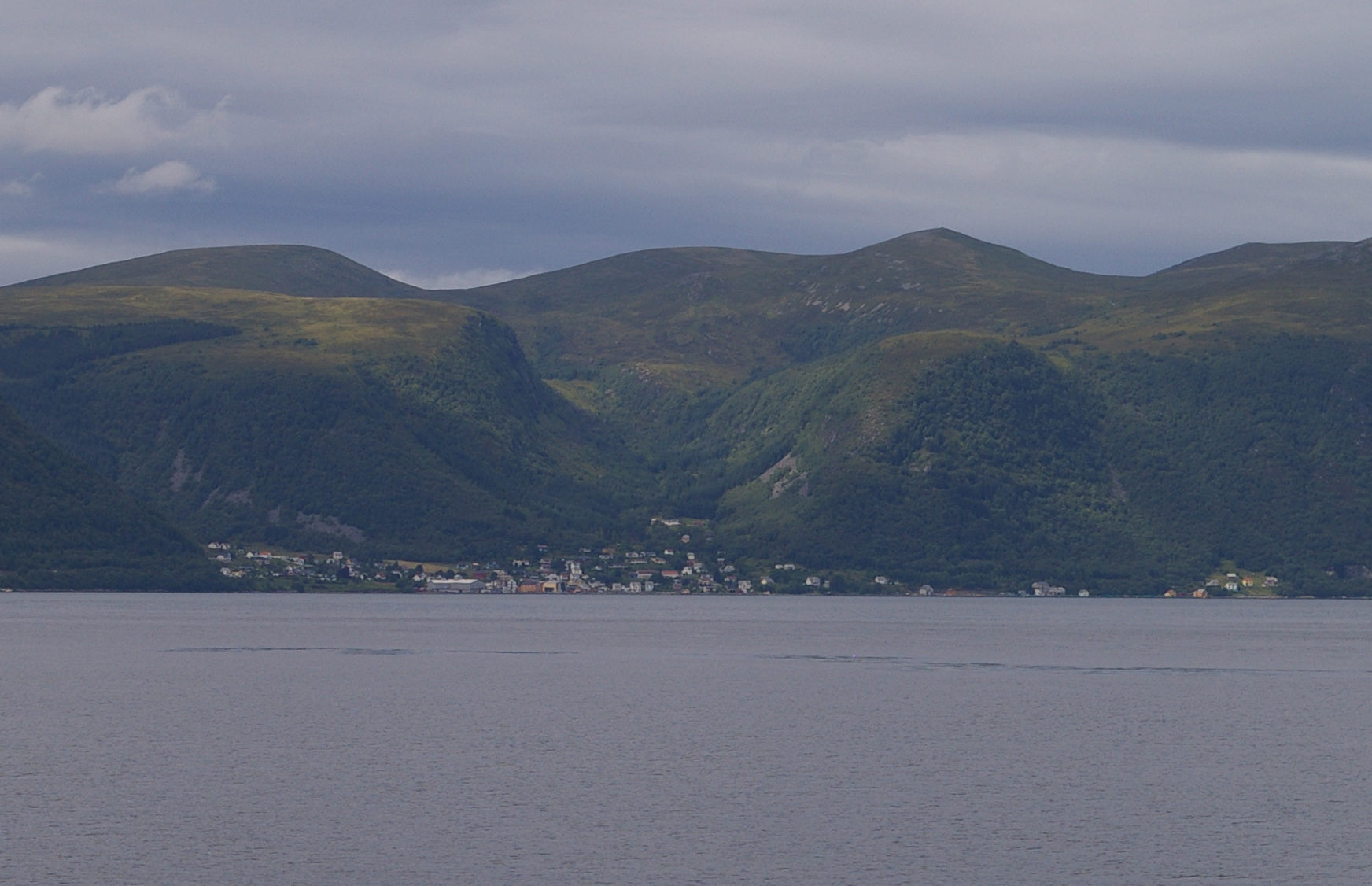
- View of the looking southwest across the fjord towards Hareidlandet
- Interactive map of the fjord
- Location: Møre og Romsdal county, Norway
- Coordinates: 62.4153°N 6.1337°E
- Type: Fjord
- Basin countries: Norway
- Max. length: 9 kilometres (5.6 mi)
- Max. width: 5 kilometres (3.1 mi)
- Max. depth: 445 metres (1,460 ft)

Sulafjorden (Urban East Norwegian: [ˈsʉ̀ːɽɑˌfjuːɳ]) is a fjord (more accurately, a sound) in Sula Municipality in Møre og Romsdal county, Norway. It is located on the border of Sula Municipality and Hareid Municipality. The great Storfjorden flows out into the Sulafjorden which then flows out into the Breidsundet sound, and on into the ocean.

The 9-kilometre (5.6 mi) long fjord is about 4 to 5 kilometres (2.5 to 3.1 mi) wide and it reaches a maximum depth of 445 metres (1,460 ft) below sea level. The island of Sula sits on the northeast side of the fjord and the island of Hareidlandet is to the southwest. The main settlements along the fjord include the villages of Brandal, Hareid, and Hjørungavåg, all on Hareidlandet. The island of Sula has very few inhabitants along the Sulafjorden.

== See also ==
- List of Norwegian fjords
