= Kilsfjord =

Kilsfjord or Kilsfjorden may refer to:

== Places ==
- Kilsfjord, Telemark, a fjord in Kragerø Municipality in Telemark county, Norway
- Kilsfjord, Møre og Romsdal, a fjord in Volda Municipality in Møre og Romsdal county, Norway
- Kilsfjord Church, a church in Volda Municipality in Møre og Romsdal county, Norway
