= Straumshamn =

Village in Volda Municipality, Norway

Straumshamn Straume
- Village
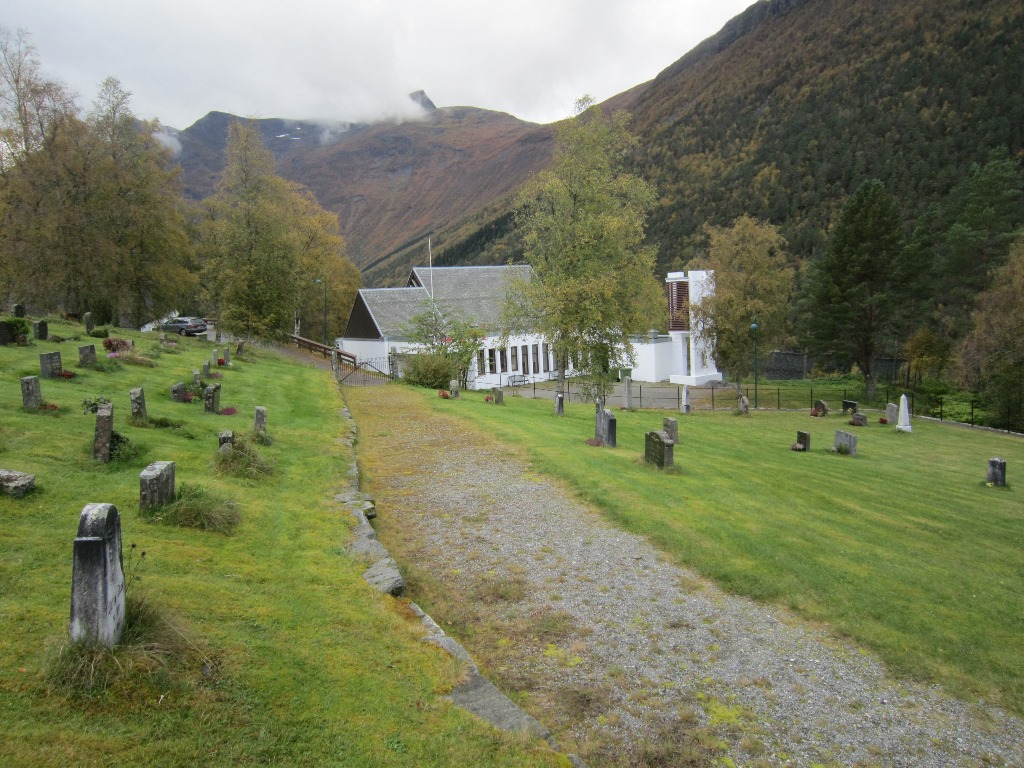
- View of the village church
- Interactive map of Straumshamn; Straume
- Location within Møre og Romsdal Location within Norway
- Coordinates: 62.0678°N 6.0650°E
- Country: Norway
- Region: Western Norway
- County: Møre og Romsdal
- District: Sunnmøre
- Municipality: Volda Municipality
- Elevation: 24 m (79 ft)
- Time zone: UTC+01:00 (CET)
  - Summer (DST): UTC+02:00 (CEST)
- Post Code: 6120 Folkestad

Straumshamn or Straume is a village in Volda Municipality in Møre og Romsdal county, Norway. The village is located at the southern end of the Kilsfjorden branch of the Voldsfjorden. The Bjørkedalen valley runs south from Straumshamn cutting between the Sunnmørsalpene mountains. The village of Folkestad lies about 8 kilometres (5.0 mi) to the northwest and the village of Fyrde lies about 20 kilometres (12 mi) to the east. Kilsfjord Church is located in Straumshamn.
