= Yri =

Yri may refer to:

- Yarí language (ISO 639 code "yri")
- Rivière-du-Loup Airport (IATA code "YRI")
- Kjell Magne Yri (born 1943), Norwegian linguist
- Yri Naelapea (1896–1969), Estonian writer, journalist, and publisher
