= Austefjord Church =

Church in Møre og Romsdal, Norway

- Austefjord kyrkje
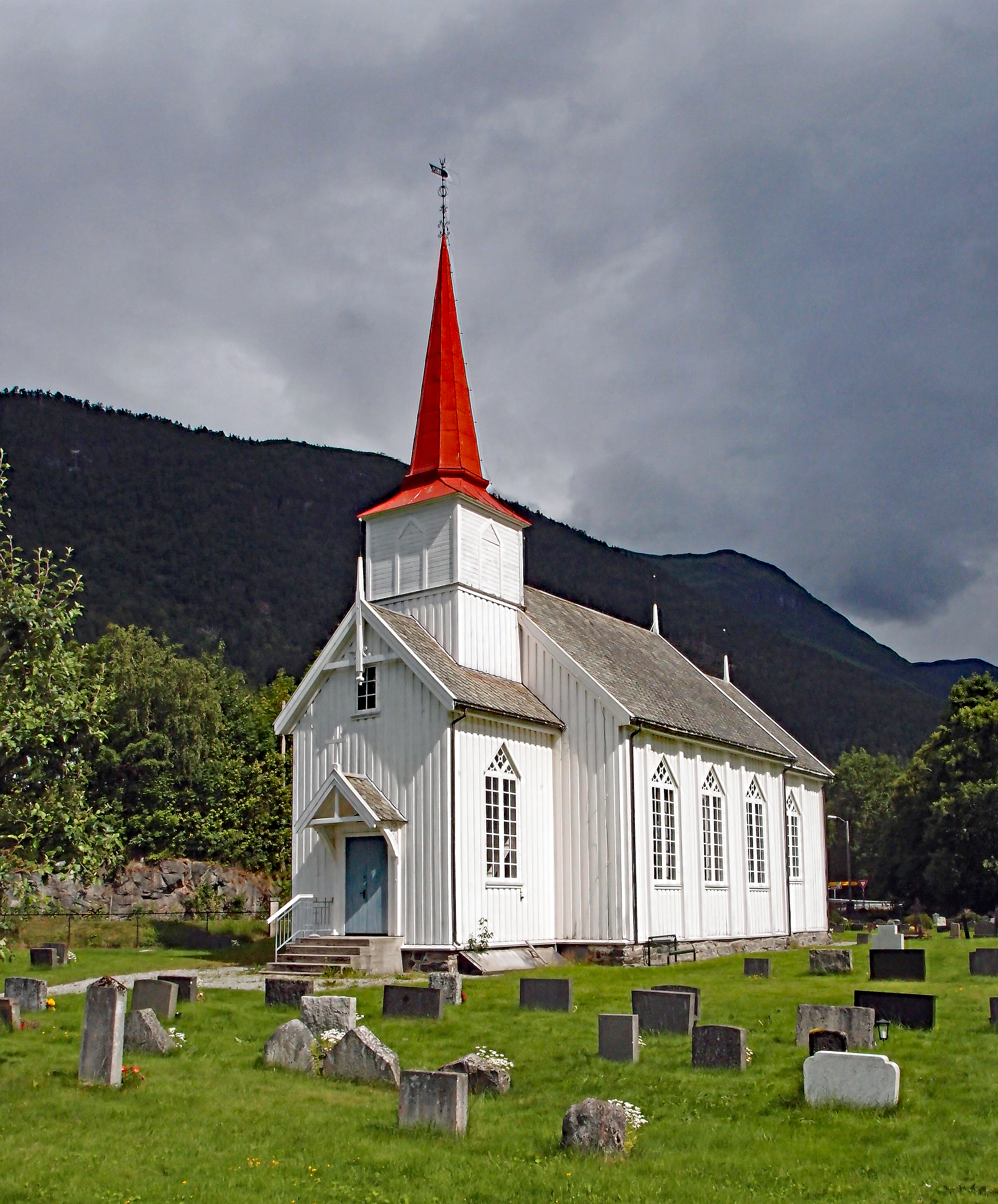
- View of the church
- Austefjord Church
- 62.061778207°N 6.3258799911°E
- Location: Volda Municipality, Møre og Romsdal
- Country: Norway
- Denomination: Church of Norway
- Churchmanship: Evangelical Lutheran

History
- Status: Parish church
- Founded: November 1879
- Consecrated: 1 July 1880
- Events: Moved from Bjugn Municipality in 1879

Architecture
- Functional status: Active
- Architectural type: Long church
- Completed: 1773 (253 years ago)

Specifications
- Capacity: 150
- Materials: Wood

Administration
- Diocese: Møre bispedømme
- Deanery: Søre Sunnmøre prosti
- Parish: Austefjord
- Norwegian Cultural Heritage Site
- Type: Church
- Status: Automatically protected
- ID: 83823

Austefjord Church (Norwegian: Austefjord kyrkje) is a parish church of the Church of Norway in Volda Municipality in Møre og Romsdal county, Norway. It is located in the village of Fyrde, at the eastern end of the Austefjorden. It is the church for the Austefjord parish which is part of the Søre Sunnmøre prosti (deanery) in the Diocese of Møre. The white, wooden church was built in a long church design in 1879 using plans drawn up by an unknown architect. The church seats about 150 people.

== History ==
The church was originally built in 1773 (some sources say 1766) in the village of Nes in Bjugn Municipality (now part of Ørland Municipality), where it was known as Nes Church. The Bjugn parish sold the church to the parish of Volda in April 1879 for 2800 kr. The church was then disassembled and moved from Nes to the village of Fyrde. It was reassembled there and renamed Austefjord Chapel (it was later renamed as a church). The builder was Gjert Lien from Nordfjord. The new church was completed and put into use in November 1879. The building was consecrated on 1 July 1880 by the local parish priest Lars Gledistch. Originally, the church was painted red, but later this was changed to white.

== Media gallery ==
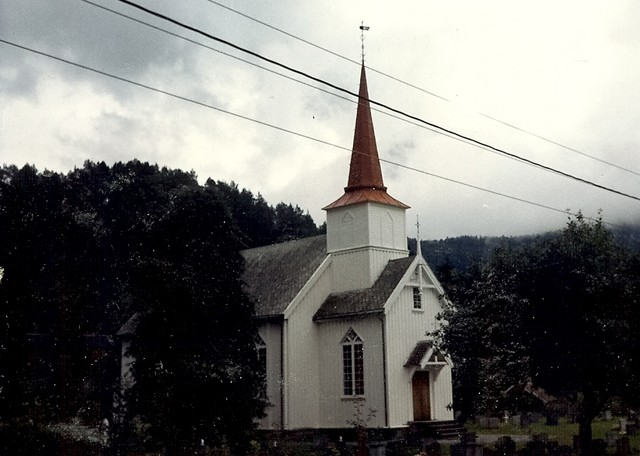

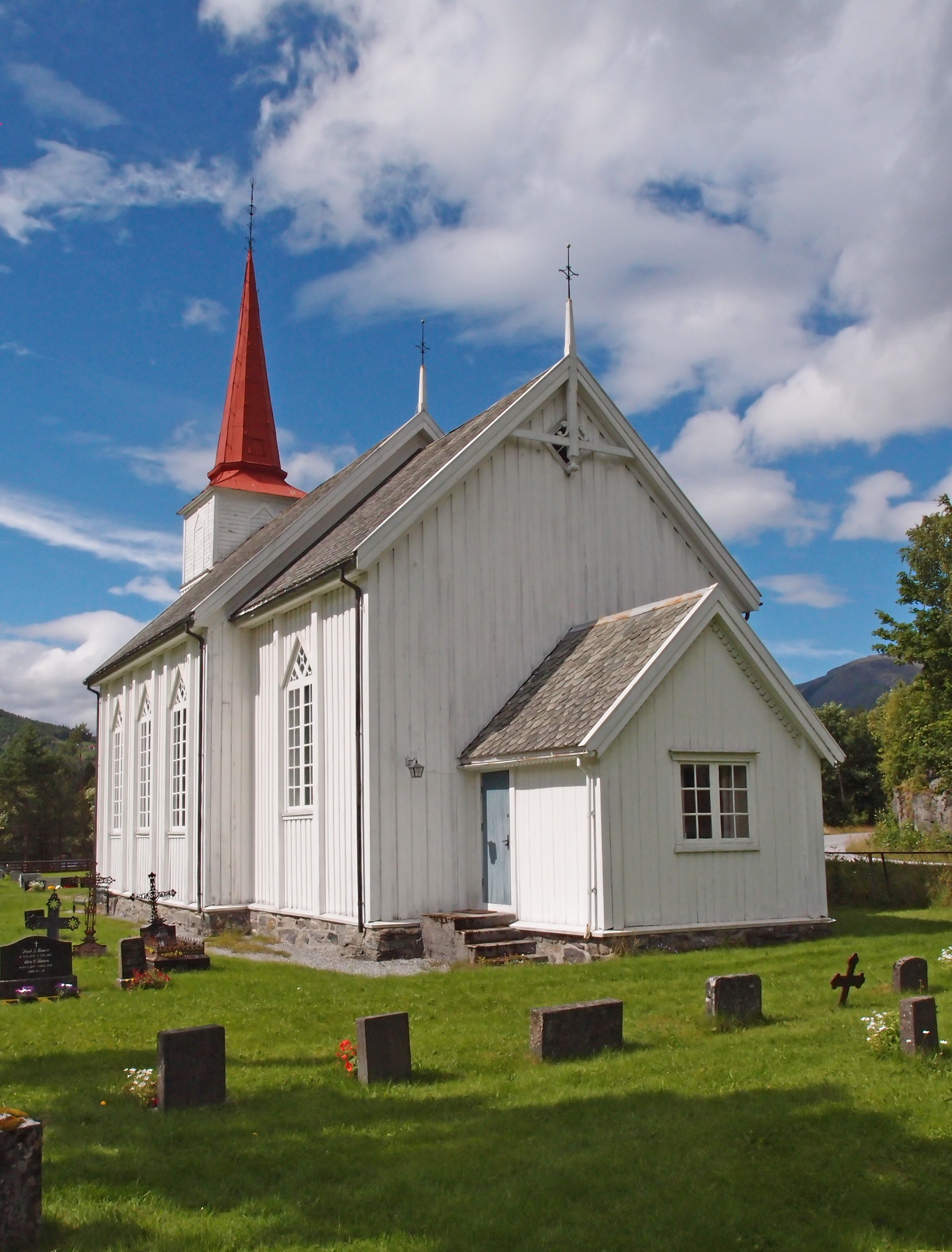

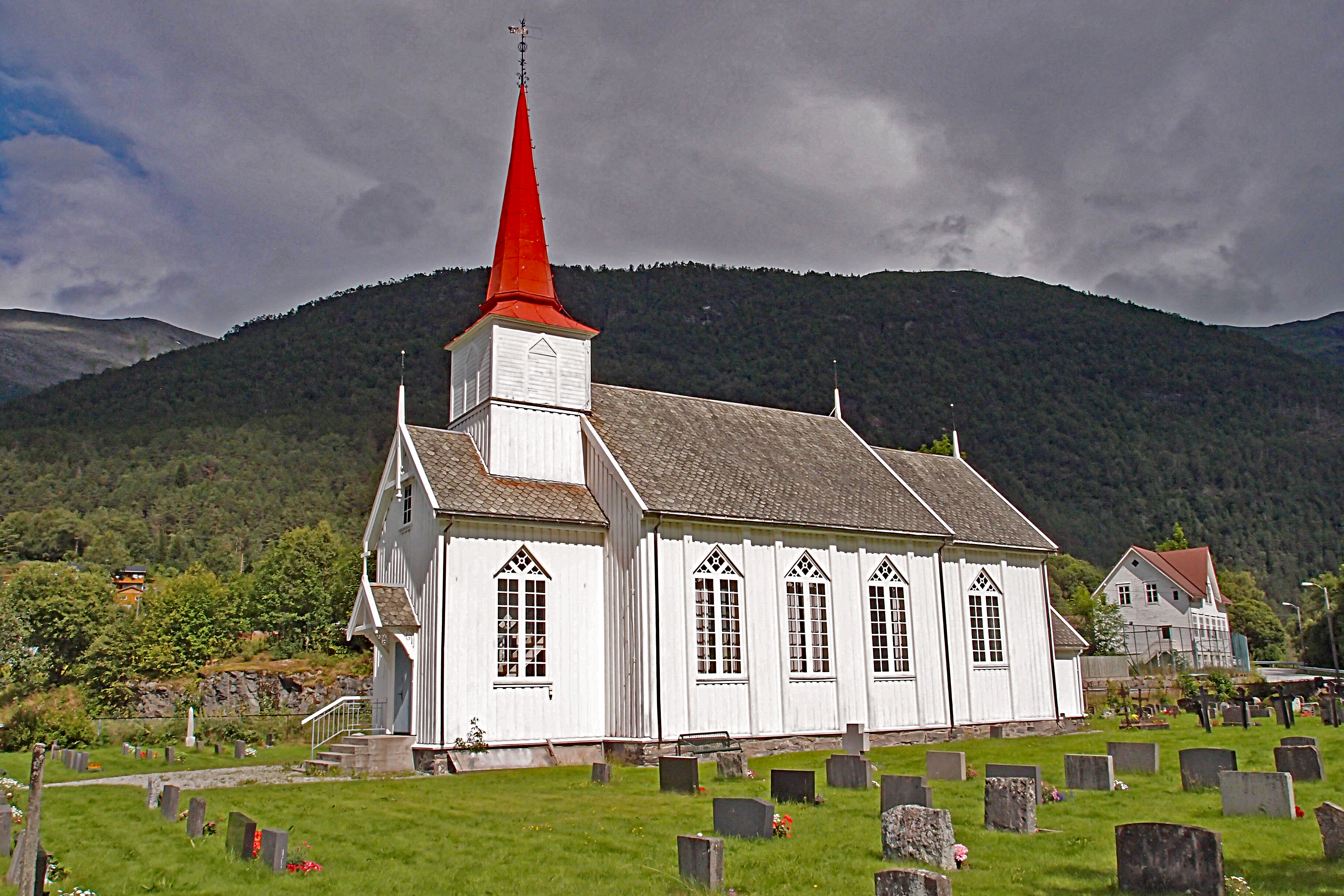

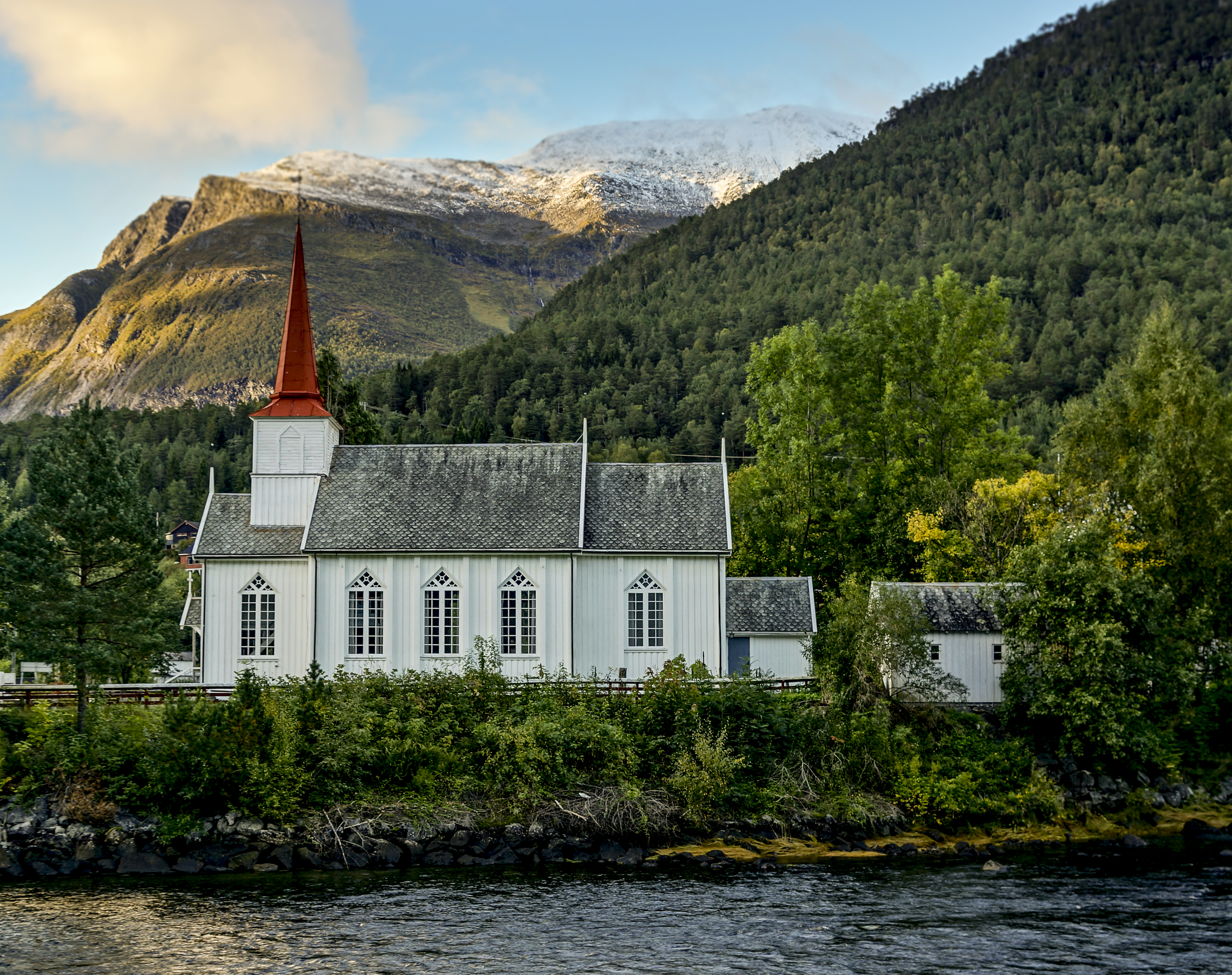

== See also ==
- List of churches in Møre
