= Eidskyrkja =

Mountain in Volda, Norway

- Kyrkjefjellet
- Interactive map of the mountain

Highest point
- Elevation: 1,482 m (4,862 ft)
- Prominence: 1,039 m (3,409 ft)
- Parent peak: Kvitegga
- Isolation: 17.1 km (10.6 mi)
- Coordinates: 62.0170°N 6.2624°E

Geography
- Location: Møre og Romsdal, Norway
- Parent range: Sunnmørsalpene
- Topo map: 1219 III Hjørundfjord

Eidskyrkja is a mountain in Volda Municipality in Møre og Romsdal county, Norway. The mountain is located about 5.5 kilometres (3.4 mi) south of the Austefjorden and the village of Fyrde and about 15 kilometres (9.3 mi) northwest of the village of Grodås.

The 1,482-metre (4,862 ft) mountain is part of the Sunnmørsalpene range and it has a prominence of 1,039 metres (3,409 ft).

== See also ==
- List of mountains of Norway
