= Sunnmøre District Court =

First-instance law court in Norway

- Sunnmøre tingrett
- 62.47526°N 6.153097°E
- Established: 10 June 2025
- Jurisdiction: Sunnmøre
- Location: Ålesund, Norway
- Coordinates: 62.47526°N 6.153097°E
- Appeals to: Frostating Court of Appeal

Sunnmøre District Court (Norwegian: Sunnmøre tingrett) is a district court in Møre og Romsdal county, Norway. The court is based at two different courthouses in Ålesund and Volda. The court existed for hundreds of years until 2021, but it was re-established in 2025. Cases from this court can be appealed to Frostating Court of Appeal. The court serves the Sunnmøre region of the county which includes cases from 14 municipalities.

- The courthouse in Volda accepts cases from the municipalities of Herøy, Sande, Vanylven, Volda, and Ørsta.
- The courthouse in Ålesund accepts cases from the municipalities of Fjord, Giske, Haram, Hareid, Stranda, Sula, Sykkylven, Ulstein, and Ålesund.

The court is led by a chief judge (sorenskriver) and several other judges. The court is a court of first instance. Its judicial duties are mainly to settle criminal cases and to resolve civil litigation as well as bankruptcy. The administration and registration tasks of the court include death registration, issuing certain certificates, performing duties of a notary public, and officiating civil wedding ceremonies. Cases from this court are heard by a combination of professional judges and lay judges.

== History ==
Historically, the Sunnmøre District Court had jurisdiction over all of Sunnmøre. In 1798, the old Sunnmøre district court was divided into two new district courts: Søre Sunnmøre District Court (based in Volda) and Nordre Sunnmøre District Court (based in Ålesund). The name of the northern court was later changed to simply "Sunnmøre District Court". This court had jurisdiction over approximately the southern third of the county, except the far southern part, and it included the municipalities of Ålesund, Giske, Haram, Norddal, Skodje, Stordal, Stranda, Sula, Sykkylven, and Ørskog.

In 1967, Ulstein Municipality and Hareid Municipality were transferred from the Søre Sunnmøre District Court to the Sunnmøre District Court.

On 26 April 2021, the Sunnmøre District Court was dissolved and merged with the Søre Sunnmøre District Court, Romsdal District Court, and Nordmøre District Court to create the new Møre og Romsdal District Court.

On 10 June 2025, the Møre og Romsdal District Court was divided into two new courts: Nordmøre og Romsdal District Court and Sunnmøre District Court. The newly re-created Sunnmøre District Court included all the municipalities in Sunnmøre, so it had a larger geographical jurisdiction than the previous version of the Sunnmøre court that existed prior to 2021.
