= Austfjorden =

Austfjorden may refer to:

- Austfjorden (Vestland), a fjord in Alver and Masfjorden municipalities in Vestland county, Norway
- Austfjorden (Svalbard), a fjord in Svalbard, Norway

== See also ==
- Austefjorden, a fjord in Volda municipality, Møre og Romsdal county, Norway
