= Romsdal District Court =

Former district court in Romsdal, Norway

- Romsdal tingrett
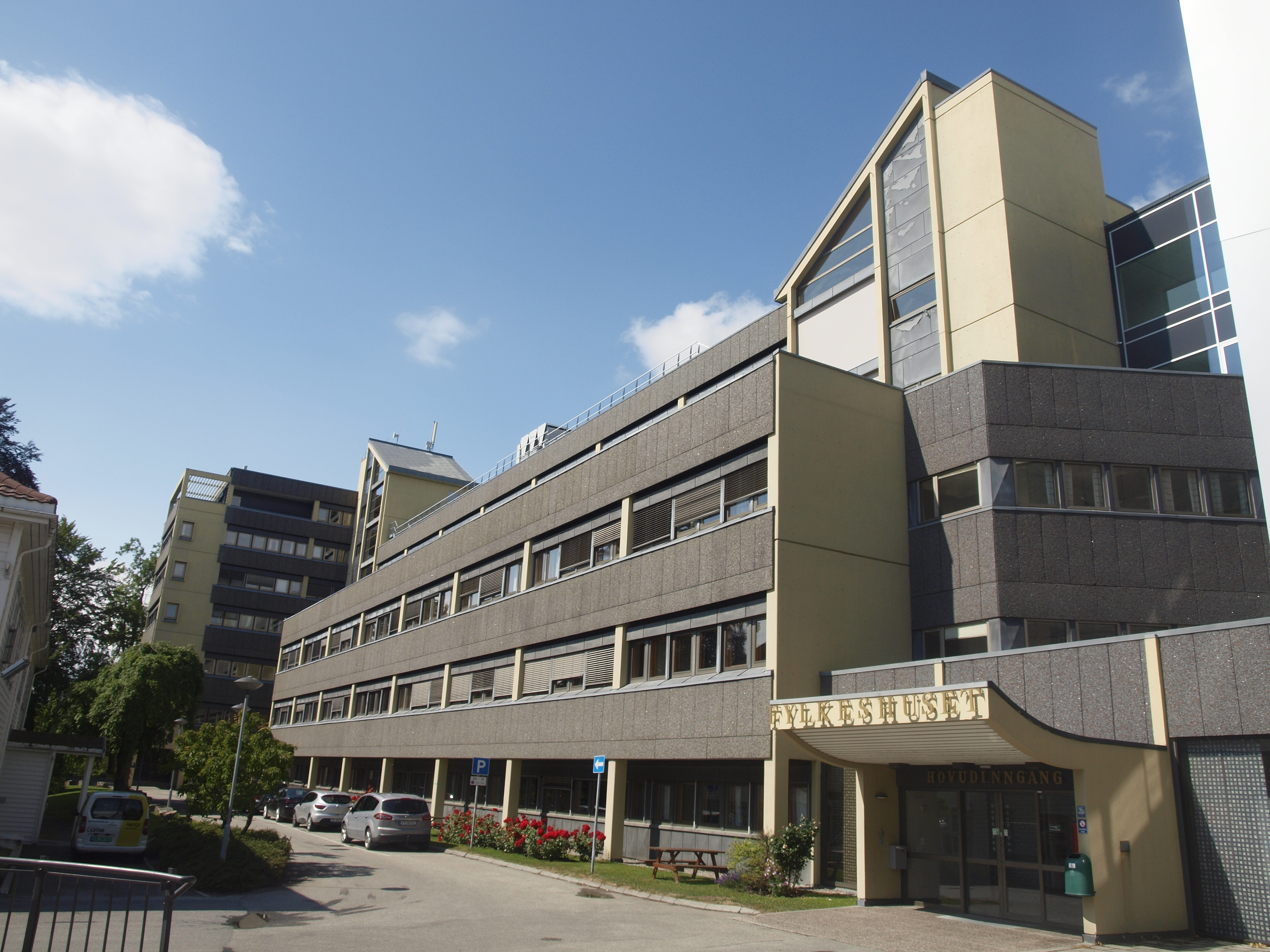
- View of the building where the court is located
- 62.73458°N 7.15084°E
- Established: 1591
- Dissolved: 26 April 2021
- Jurisdiction: Romsdalen, Norway
- Location: Julsundvegen 9 Molde, Molde Municipality
- Coordinates: 62.73458°N 7.15084°E
- Appeals to: Frostating Court of Appeal

Romsdal District Court (Norwegian: Romsdal tingrett) was a district court in Møre og Romsdal county, Norway. The court was based in the town of Molde. The court existed until 2021. It had jurisdiction over the central part of the county which included the municipalities of Aukra, Fræna, Midsund, Molde, Nesset, Rauma, Sandøy, and Vestnes. Cases from this court could be appealed to Frostating Court of Appeal. The court was led by the chief judge (Sorenskriver) Svein Eikrem. This court employed a chief judge and three other judges.

The court was a court of first instance. Its judicial duties were mainly to settle criminal cases and to resolve civil litigation as well as bankruptcy. The administration and registration tasks of the court included death registration, issuing certain certificates, performing duties of a notary public, and officiating civil wedding ceremonies. Cases from this court were heard by a combination of professional judges and lay judges.

== History ==
This court was established in 1591 when district courts were established in Norway. On 26 April 2021, this court was merged with the Sunnmøre District Court, Søre Sunnmøre District Court, and Nordmøre District Court to create the new Møre og Romsdal District Court.
