= Nordmøre District Court =

Former district court in Romsdal, Norway

- Nordmøre tingrett
- Interactive map of Nordmøre District Court
- 63.108337°N 7.7279038°E
- Established: 1591
- Dissolved: 26 April 2021
- Jurisdiction: Nordmøre
- Location: Kristiansund, Norway
- Coordinates: 63.108337°N 7.7279038°E
- Appeals to: Frostating Court of Appeal

Nordmøre District Court (Norwegian: Nordmøre tingrett) was a district court in Møre og Romsdal county, Norway. The court was based in the town of Kristiansund. The court existed until 2021. It had jurisdiction over the northern part of the county which included the municipalities of Kristiansund, Aure, Averøy, Eide, Gjemnes, Halsa, Smøla, Sunndal, Surnadal and Tingvoll. Cases from this court could be appealed to Frostating Court of Appeal. This court employed a chief judge, three other judges, and eight prosecutors.

The court was a court of first instance. Its judicial duties were mainly to settle criminal cases and to resolve civil litigation as well as bankruptcy. The administration and registration tasks of the court included death registration, issuing certain certificates, performing duties of a notary public, and officiating civil wedding ceremonies. Cases from this court were heard by a combination of professional judges and lay judges.

== History ==
This court was established in 1591 when district courts were established in Norway. On 1 January 1991, the old Kristiansund District Court (which served only the town of Kristiansund) was merged with the Nordmøre District Court (which served the surrounding region). On 26 April 2021, this court was merged with the Sunnmøre District Court, Søre Sunnmøre District Court, and Romsdal District Court to create the new Møre og Romsdal District Court.
