= Nordmøre and Romsdal District Court =

First-instance law court in Norway

- Nordmøre og Romsdal tingrett
- Interactive map of Nordmøre and Romsdal; District Court
- 62°44′04″N 7°09′03″E
- Jurisdiction: Nordmøre and Romsdal, Norway
- Location: Molde, Møre og Romsdal
- Coordinates: 62°44′04″N 7°09′03″E
- Appeals to: Frostating Court of Appeal
- Website: Official website

Nordmøre and Romsdal District Court (Norwegian: Nordmøre og Romsdal tingrett) is a district court located in Møre og Romsdal county, Norway. This court is based at two different courthouses which are located in Molde and Kristiansund. The court is subordinate to the Frostating Court of Appeal. The court serves the northern part of the county which includes cases from 17 municipalities.

- The court in Kristiansund accepts cases from the municipalities of Aure, Averøy, Gjemnes, Kristiansund, Smøla, Sunndal, Surnadal, and Tingvoll.
- The court in Molde accepts cases from the municipalities of Aukra, Hustadvika, Molde, Rauma, and Vestnes.

The court is led by a chief judge (sorenskriver) and several other judges. The court is a court of first instance. Its judicial duties are mainly to settle criminal cases and to resolve civil litigation as well as bankruptcy. The administration and registration tasks of the court include death registration, issuing certain certificates, performing duties of a notary public, and officiating civil wedding ceremonies. Cases from this court are heard by a combination of professional judges and lay judges.

== History ==
This court was established on 10 June 2025 after the old Møre og Romsdal District Court was dissolved and divided into two separate courts with the new Sunnmøre District Court having jurisdiction over the southern part of the county and the new Nordmøre og Romsdal District Court having jurisdiction over the northern part of the county. The new district court system continues to use the courthouses from the predecessor court.
