= Gunn Berit Gjerde =

Norwegian politician (born 1954)

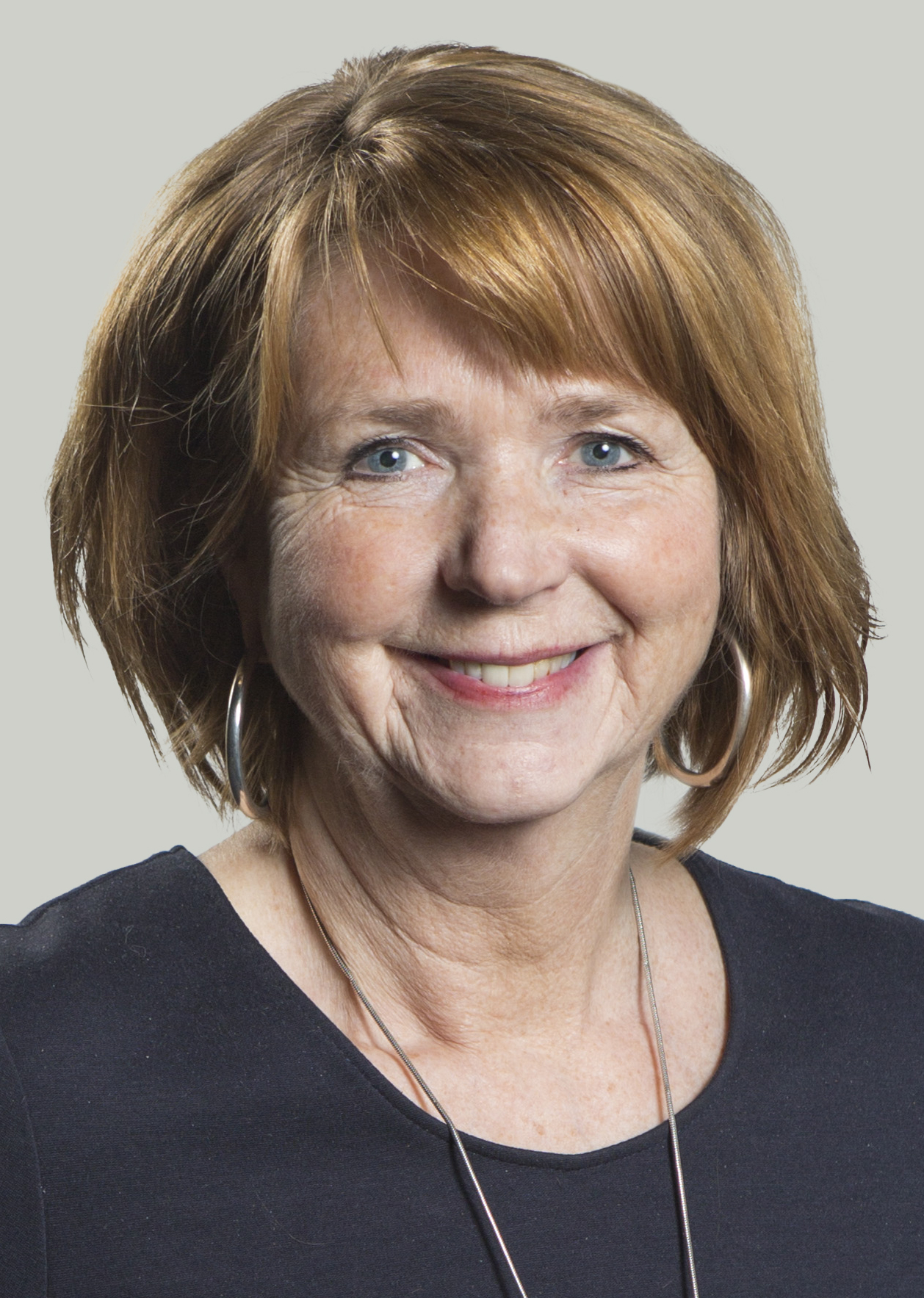
Gunn Berit Gjerde

Gunn Berit Gjerde (born 28 April 1954) is a Norwegian politician for the Liberal Party.

She serves as a deputy representative to the Norwegian Parliament from Møre og Romsdal during the term 2005–2009.

On the local level Gjerde was a member of the municipal council for Hareid Municipality from 1987 to 1991, and later served as mayor from 1999 to 2007.
