= Anders Riise =

Norwegian politician

Anders Riise (born 25 January 1969) is a Norwegian politician for the Conservative Party.

He served as a deputy representative to the Parliament of Norway from Møre og Romsdal during the term 2017–2021. He became mayor of Hareid Municipality in 2011, and is also a member of Møre og Romsdal county council.
