= Hareid Church =

Church in Møre og Romsdal, Norway

- Hareid kyrkje
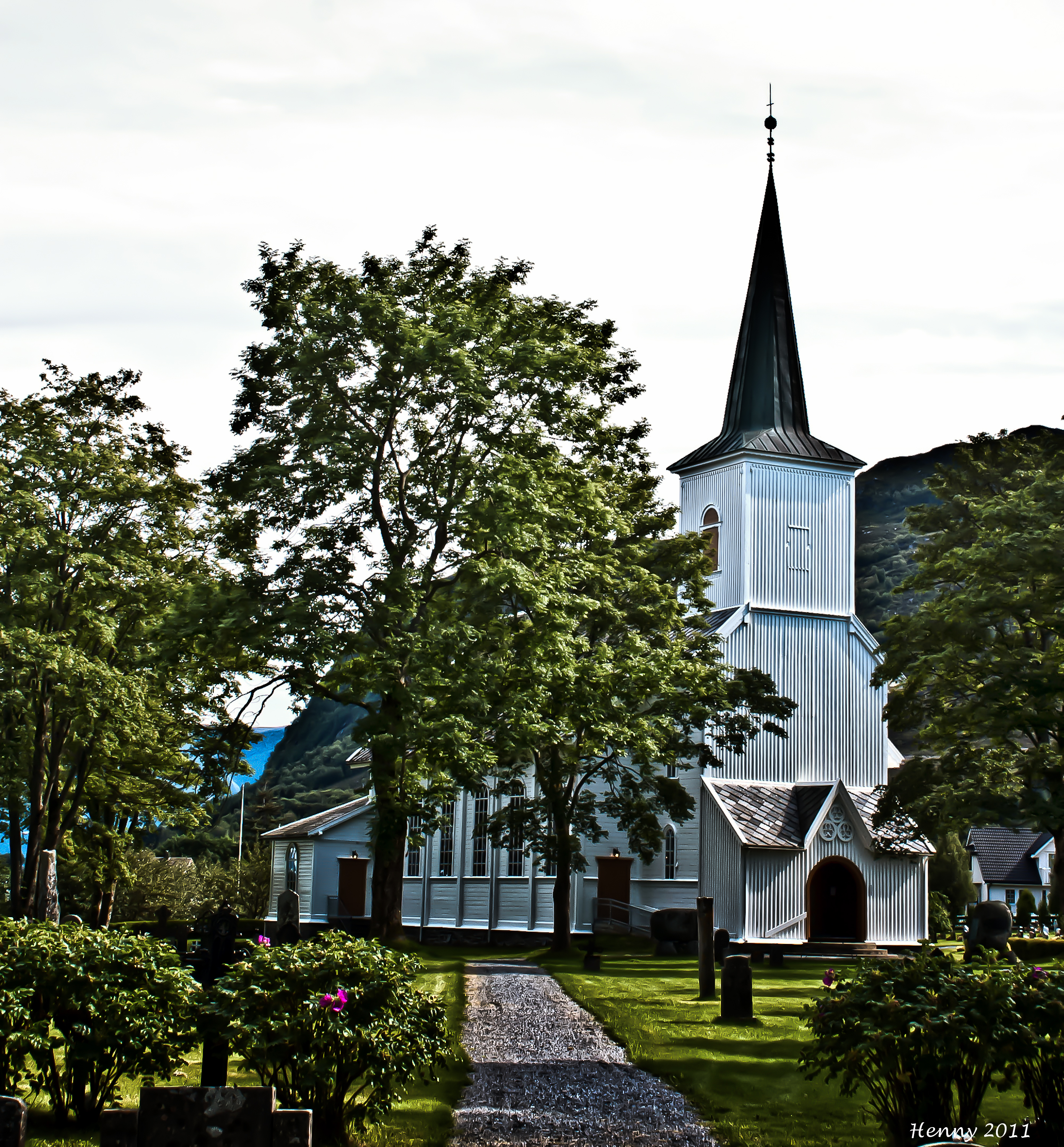
- View of the church
- Hareid Church
- 62°22′02″N 6°01′48″E
- Location: Hareid Municipality, Møre og Romsdal
- Country: Norway
- Denomination: Church of Norway
- Churchmanship: Evangelical Lutheran

History
- Status: Parish church
- Founded: 13th century
- Consecrated: 13 December 1877

Architecture
- Functional status: Active
- Architect(s): Heinrich Ernst Schirmer and Wilhelm von Hanno
- Architectural type: Long church
- Completed: 1877 (149 years ago)

Specifications
- Capacity: 400
- Materials: Wood

Administration
- Diocese: Møre bispedømme
- Deanery: Søre Sunnmøre prosti
- Parish: Hareid
- Norwegian Cultural Heritage Site
- Type: Church
- Status: Listed
- ID: 84483

Hareid Church (Norwegian: Hareid kyrkje) is a parish church of the Church of Norway in Hareid Municipality in Møre og Romsdal county, Norway. It is located in the village of Hareid on the eastern side of the island of Hareidlandet. It is the church for the Hareid parish which is part of the Søre Sunnmøre prosti (deanery) in the Diocese of Møre. The white, wooden church was built in a long church design in 1877 using plans drawn up by the architects Heinrich Ernst Schirmer and Wilhelm von Hanno. The church seats about 400 people.

== History ==
The earliest existing historical records of the church date back to 1432, but it was not new that year. The first church in Hareid was a wooden stave church was likely built in the 13th century. The church was located about 80 metres (260 ft) to the northwest of the present site of the church. The original building had a nave that measured about 20 by 8.15 metres (65.6 ft × 26.7 ft), a choir that measured about 5.6 by 6.9 metres (18 ft × 23 ft), and a church porch that measured 5 by 5 metres (16 ft × 16 ft). Around the year 1640, a timber-framed transept was built off of the north side of the nave as a way of adding more seats in the church, but also to help support the old medieval structure. After the addition, the building reached a size of about 240 square metres (2,600 sq ft).

On 25 February 1806, the church was struck by lightning and it burned to the ground. A replacement church was built about 80 metres (260 ft) to the east of the old stave church. It was a timber-framed, octagonal building that was designed by the local parish priest, Peder Thomas Buschmann and Elling Valbø from Ørskog was the lead builder. Work on the new church was carried out in 1807-1808 when the main building was built and enclosed with a roof. The altar, pulpit, sacristy, and windows were started, but then the work stopped for several years. The building was not completed fully until 1820.

In 1814, this church served as an election church (Norwegian: valgkirke). Together with more than 300 other parish churches across Norway, it was a polling station for elections to the 1814 Norwegian Constituent Assembly which wrote the Constitution of Norway. This was Norway's first national elections. Each church parish was a constituency that elected people called "electors" who later met together in each county to elect the representatives for the assembly that was to meet at Eidsvoll Manor later that year.

The new church was fully completed in 1820 and it was consecrated on 25 June 1820. Soon after, it was realized that the ground under the new church site was not suitable for supporting the building. The timber structure began to sag and shift soon after its completion. After nearly 60 years of use, the church was torn down in 1876. In 1876–1877, a new church was built on the same site. The parish hired the architects Heinrich Ernst Schirmer and Wilhelm von Hanno and the lead builder was Knut Stokkeland. The new building was designed in a Romanesque Revival style and it was consecrated on 13 December 1877 by the local parish priest Christian Wisløff. On 3 January 1902, the church was struck by lightning and the ensuing fire caused significant damage, but the church was repaired soon after.

== See also ==
- List of churches in Møre
