= Hareid (village) =

Village in Hareid Municipality, Norway

- Village
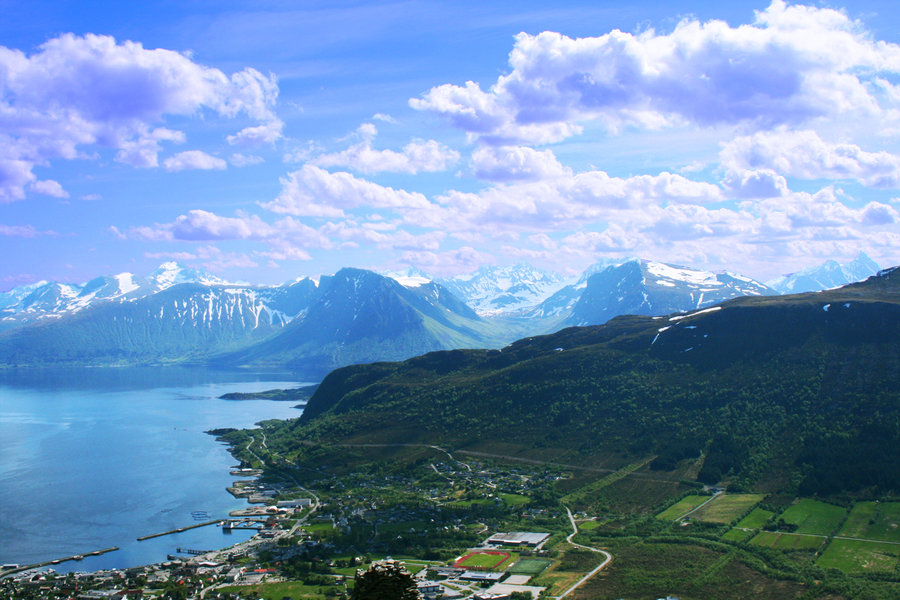
- View of the village
- Interactive map of Hareid
- Location within Møre og Romsdal Location within Norway
- Coordinates: 62.3704°N 6.0290°E
- Country: Norway
- Region: Western Norway
- County: Møre og Romsdal
- District: Sunnmøre
- Municipality: Hareid Municipality

Area
  - Total: 2.63 km^{2} (1.02 sq mi)
- Elevation: 3 m (9.8 ft)

Population (2024)
  - Total: 3,662
  - Density: 1,392/km^{2} (3,610/sq mi)
- Time zone: UTC+01:00 (CET)
  - Summer (DST): UTC+02:00 (CEST)
- Post Code: 6060 Hareid

Hareid is the administrative centre of Hareid Municipality in Møre og Romsdal county, Norway. The village is located on the eastern coast of the island of Hareidlandet, along the Sulafjorden. The village has a shopping center, some industry, a hotel, and Hareid Church.

The 2.63-square-kilometre (650-acre) village has a population (2024) of 3,662 and a population density of 1,392 inhabitants per square kilometre (3,610/sq mi).

The Norwegian County Road 61 runs from Hareid to the town of Ulsteinvik on the other side of the island. There is also a ferry that runs between Hareid and Sulesund across the Sulafjorden on the island of Sula. There is another road heading north from Hareid to the village of Brandal, and it heads south to the village of Hjørungavåg.
