= Brandal =

Village in Hareid Municipality, Norway

Brandal Branddal (historic)
- Village
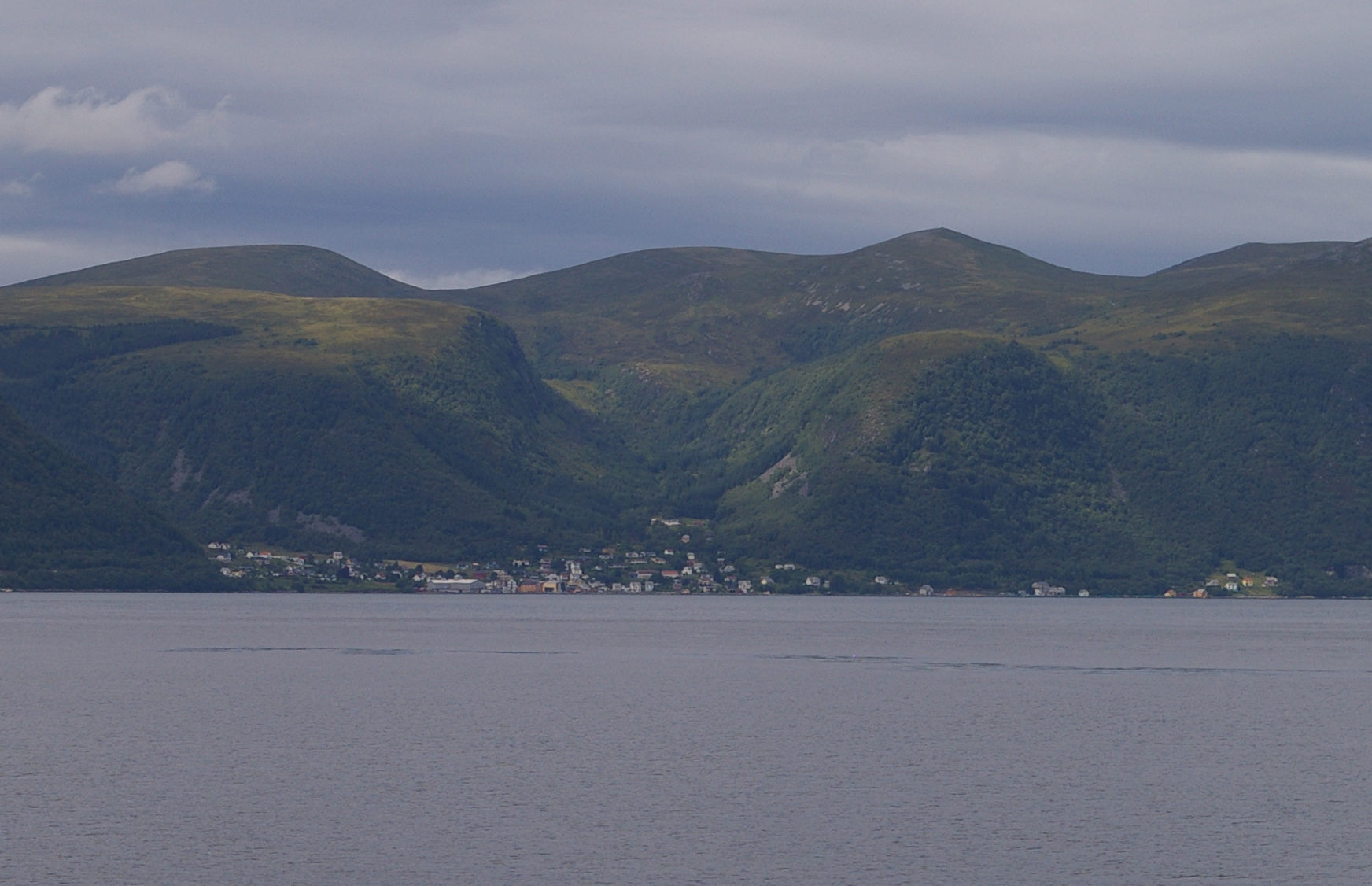
- View of Brandal
- Interactive map of Brandal
- Location within Møre og Romsdal Location within Norway
- Coordinates: 62.4008°N 6.0083°E
- Country: Norway
- Region: Western Norway
- County: Møre og Romsdal
- District: Sunnmøre
- Municipality: Hareid Municipality

Area
  - Total: 0.32 km^{2} (0.12 sq mi)
- Elevation: 4 m (13 ft)

Population (2024)
  - Total: 319
  - Density: 997/km^{2} (2,580/sq mi)
- Time zone: UTC+01:00 (CET)
  - Summer (DST): UTC+02:00 (CEST)
- Post Code: 6062 Brandal

Brandal is a village in Hareid Municipality in Møre og Romsdal county, Norway. It is located on the eastern shores of the island of Hareidlandet, along the Sulafjorden. The village lies about 3.5 kilometres (2.2 mi) north of the municipal centre of Hareid and about 15 kilometres (9.3 mi) northeast of the town of Ulsteinvik on the other side of the island.

The 0.32-square-kilometre (79-acre) village has a population (2024) of 319 and a population density of 997 inhabitants per square kilometre (2,580/sq mi).

== Seal hunting ==
Brandal was historically known as the home of seal hunters, which had annual hunting trips to the White Sea from 1898 until 1939, and to West Ice and Newfoundland from 1939 until 1982. A pioneer in seal hunting was captain and shipowner Peter S. Brandal. The Museum Aarvak (founded in 1981) is located in Brandal. On the grounds of the museum stands the monument Ishavskjerringa, made by Bjørn Tore Skjølsvik and was unveiled on 18 June 2005.
