= Kilsfjord Church =

Church in Møre og Romsdal, Norway

- Kilsfjord kyrkje
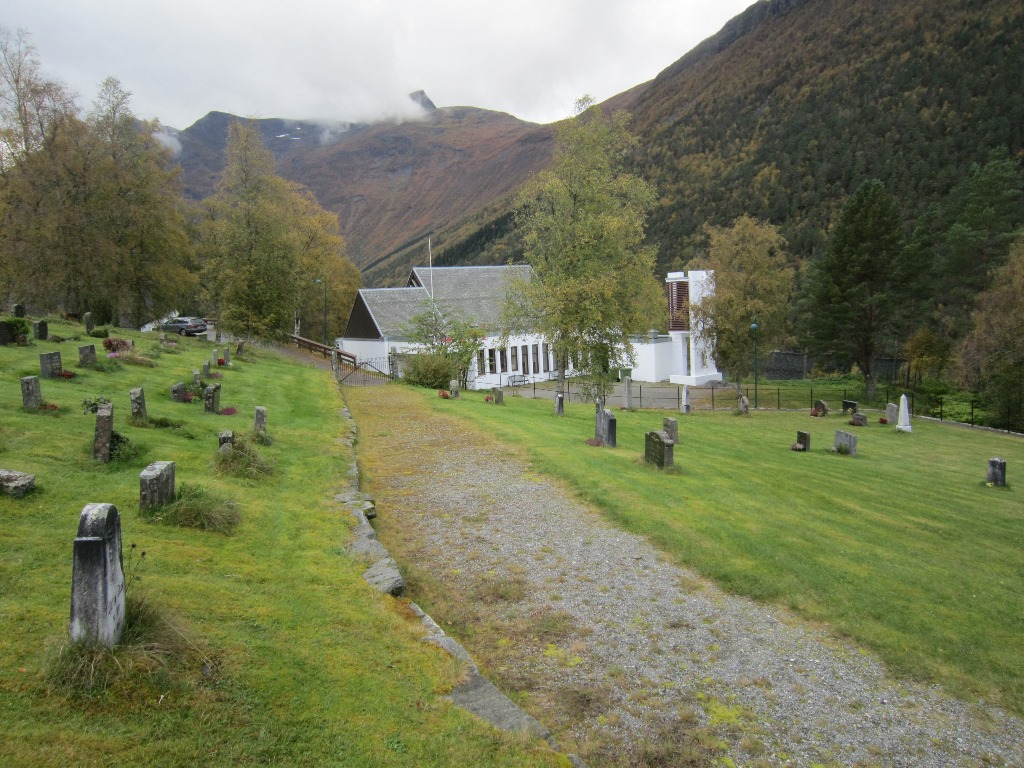
- View of the church
- Kilsfjord Church
- 62.064328379°N 6.06456148631°E
- Location: Volda, Møre og Romsdal
- Country: Norway
- Denomination: Church of Norway
- Churchmanship: Evangelical Lutheran

History
- Status: Parish church
- Founded: 1974
- Consecrated: 1974

Architecture
- Functional status: Active
- Architect: Alf Apelseth
- Architectural type: Rectangular
- Completed: 1974 (52 years ago)

Specifications
- Capacity: 200
- Materials: Concrete

Administration
- Diocese: Møre bispedømme
- Deanery: Søre Sunnmøre prosti
- Parish: Kilsfjord
- Norwegian Cultural Heritage Site
- Type: Church
- Status: Not protected
- ID: 84772

Kilsfjord Church (Norwegian: Kilsfjord kyrkje) is a parish church of the Church of Norway in Volda Municipality in Møre og Romsdal county, Norway. It is located in the village of Straumshamn, at the southern end of the Kilsfjorden. It is the church for the Kilsfjord parish which is part of the Søre Sunnmøre prosti (deanery) in the Diocese of Møre. The concrete church was built in a rectangular "modern" design in 1974 using plans drawn up by the architect Alf Apelseth. The church seats about 200 people.

== History ==
The church in Straumshamn was established in 1974. The concrete church was designed by Alf Apelseth. The church has a rectangular design meaning that the nave and chancel areas are both in the same room. The church has striking similarities to Nordsida Church in Stryn Municipality, which was designed by the same architect and was consecrated the year before. This church was consecrated on 28 April 1974.

== See also ==
- List of churches in Møre
