= Kjell Magne Yri =

Norwegian priest, linguist and translator (born 1943)

- Born: 5 November 1943 (age 82); Hareid Municipality, Norway
- Education: MF Norwegian School of Theology; University of Oslo
- Known for: Bible translations
- Scientific career
- Fields: Linguistics
- Workplaces: University of Oslo

Kjell Magne Yri (born 5 November 1943) is a Norwegian priest, linguist and translator.

He hails from Hareid Municipality. He was interested in linguistics at an early age; during Norwegian classes in secondary school he read books in Greek and Esperanto. During his spare time he read Swahili. He combined the language interest with religious studies after a friend encouraged him to become a bible translator, eventually graduating from the MF Norwegian School of Theology with the cand.theol. degree in 1970. He also minored in Greek at the University of Oslo, as well as studying Latin and Hebrew. He was eventually given an assignment to translate the New Testament for the Norwegian Lutheran Mission, who found the official Norwegian translation too liberal. He was occupied with this translation from 1968 to 1973.

In 1973 he travelled with his family to work as a priest in Ethiopia. He learned both the Amharic and Oromo languages, and was later sent to work in the Sidama Zone. While staying here, he translated the New Testament into Sidamo. It took twelve years, and he was finished in 1988.

In 1989 Yri reached what he describes as a "crossroads" in his life. He left the Norwegian Lutheran Mission, and took up studies again at the University of Oslo. He ultimately took the dr.philos. degree in 1996, and in 2000 he was appointed as an associate professor. From 2002 to 2007 he conducted a large research project on languages in Ethiopia.

His marriage broke down in 1989, but he later remarried, this time to a Chilean linguist. This prompted Yri to learn Spanish, and to attempt to learn Mapudungun. Yri resides in Nittedal Municipality, and from 1998 to 2002 he was the local church organist there.

== Publications by Yri ==
- Mitike, Nigussie Meshesha, and Kjell Magne Yri. "socio-political discourse and communication in sidaama folk media." Oslo Studies in Language 8.1 (2017).
- Yri, Kjell Magne. 2016. School Grammars with Everyday Vocabulary. Binyam Sisay Mendisu & Janne Bondi Johannessen (eds.) Multilingual Ethiopia: Linguistic Challenges and Capacity Building Efforts, pp. 319–338. Oslo: University of Oslo.
- Yri, Kjell Magne. My father taught me how to cry, but now I have forgotten: the semantics of religious concepts with an emphasis on meaning, interpretation and translatability. Universitetsforlaget, 1998.
- Yri, Kjell Magne. "Orthography and phonology in Sidaamu Afoo (Sidamo)." Journal of Ethiopian Studies 37.1 (2004): 41–56.
- Yri, Kjell Magne. "A Contribution to the Understanding of Metathesis and Assimilation in Sidaamu Afó." Lunde forlag. Oslo (1990).
- Yri, Kjell Magne. "Decategorialization of Nouns as Postpositions in Sidaamu? afo and Amharic." Current Issues in the Analysis of Semitic Grammar and Lexicon II: Oslo-Göteborg Cooperation fourth-5 November 2005 2 (2006): 116.
- Yri, Kjell Magne. "The singulative in Sidaamu Afó." Folia Orientalia 45 (2006): 157–67.
- Yri, Kjell Magne. "La producción de alfabetos como guerra de liberación." Discurso, sociedad y lenguaje: una anamorfósis en el nuevo milenio. Lincom Europa, 2002.
- Yri, Kjell Magne. "Recreating religion. The translation of central religious terms in the light of a cognitive approach to semantics." In The Bible through metaphor and translation. A cognitive semantic perspective, edited by Kurt Feyaerts (2003): 187–203. (Religion and Discourse, ed. by James M.M. Francis, vol. 15.) Oxford: Peter Lang.
- Yri, Kjell Magne. "The Phonology of" Sidaamu Afii Jirte": Implications for the Orthography of Sidaama." Journal of Ethiopian Studies 44 (2011): 149-161.
- Yri, Kjell Magne. "School grammars with everyday vocabulary: suggestion for a culture specific approach, with sidaamu afoo as an example." Oslo Studies in Language 8.1 (2017).
- Yri, Kjell Magne. "Cleft sentences in Amharic, with special reference to reference." Current issues in the analysis of Semitic grammar and lexicon 56.3 (2005): 41.
- Yri, Kjell Magne. "A Learner's Grammar of Beja (East Sudan)." (2012): 471–474.
