= Fyrde =

Village in Volda Municipality, Norway

- Village
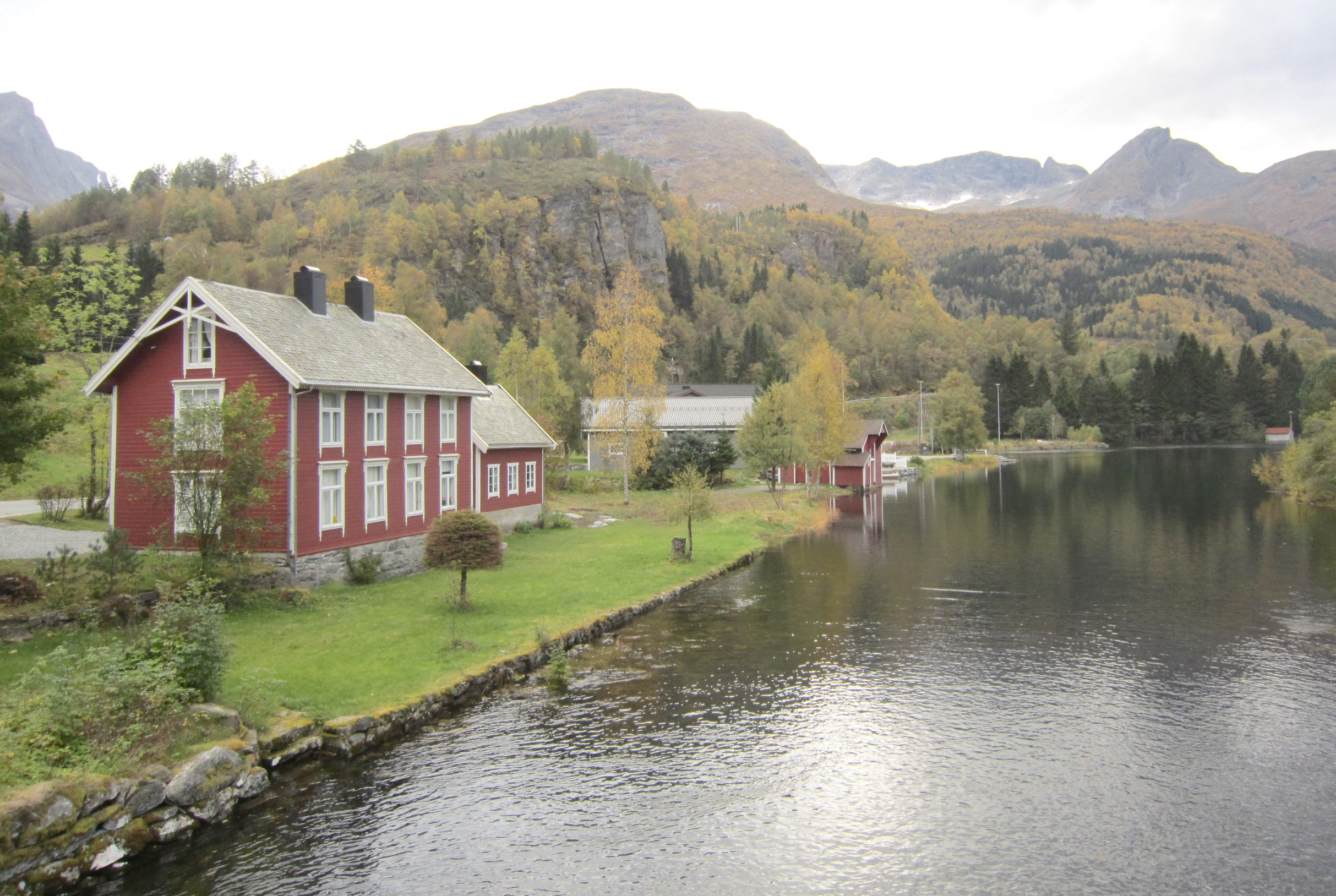
- View of the river which runs through the village
- Interactive map of Fyrde
- Location within Møre og Romsdal Location within Norway
- Coordinates: 62.0631°N 6.3252°E
- Country: Norway
- Region: Western Norway
- County: Møre og Romsdal
- District: Sunnmøre
- Municipality: Volda Municipality
- Elevation: 8 m (26 ft)
- Time zone: UTC+01:00 (CET)
  - Summer (DST): UTC+02:00 (CEST)
- Post Code: 6110 Austefjorden

Fyrde is a village in Volda Municipality in Møre og Romsdal county, Norway. The village is located at the end of the Austefjorden branch of the main Voldsfjorden. Austefjord Church is located in Fyrde.

In 2012, the European route E39 highway was re-routed so that it goes through the village of Fyrde. The 6,563-metre (4.1 mi) long Kviven Tunnel was built just southeast of the village of Fyrde, through the mountain Kviven, and it connected the Fyrde area to the village of Grodås in neighboring Hornindal Municipality in Sogn og Fjordane county. In 2020, Hornindal Municipality became part of Volda Municipality in part because of the new tunnel connecting the two formerly separate areas.
