= Hjørungavåg =

Village in Hareid Municipality, Norway

- Village
- Interactive map of Hjørungavåg
- Location within Møre og Romsdal Location within Norway
- Coordinates: 62.35274°N 6.07175°E
- Country: Norway
- Region: Western Norway
- County: Møre og Romsdal
- District: Sunnmøre
- Municipality: Hareid Municipality

Area
  - Total: 0.78 km^{2} (0.30 sq mi)
- Elevation: 28 m (92 ft)

Population (2024)
  - Total: 716
  - Density: 918/km^{2} (2,380/sq mi)
- Time zone: UTC+01:00 (CET)
  - Summer (DST): UTC+02:00 (CEST)
- Post Code: 6063 Hjørungavåg

Hjørungavåg is a village in Hareid Municipality in Møre og Romsdal county, Norway. The village is located on the eastern shore of the island of Hareidlandet, just southeast of the municipal centre of Hareid.

The 0.78-square-kilometre (190-acre) village has a population (2024) of 716 and a population density of 918 inhabitants per square kilometre (2,380/sq mi).

The area was historically known as Liavåg. Due to the fact that the historic Battle of Hjörungavágr in 986 may have been fought in the vicinity of the village, the village was renamed Hjørungavåg in 1897. The village celebrated the 1000-year anniversary of the battle in 1986.
