= Austefjord =

Fjord in Volda, Norway

Austefjorden
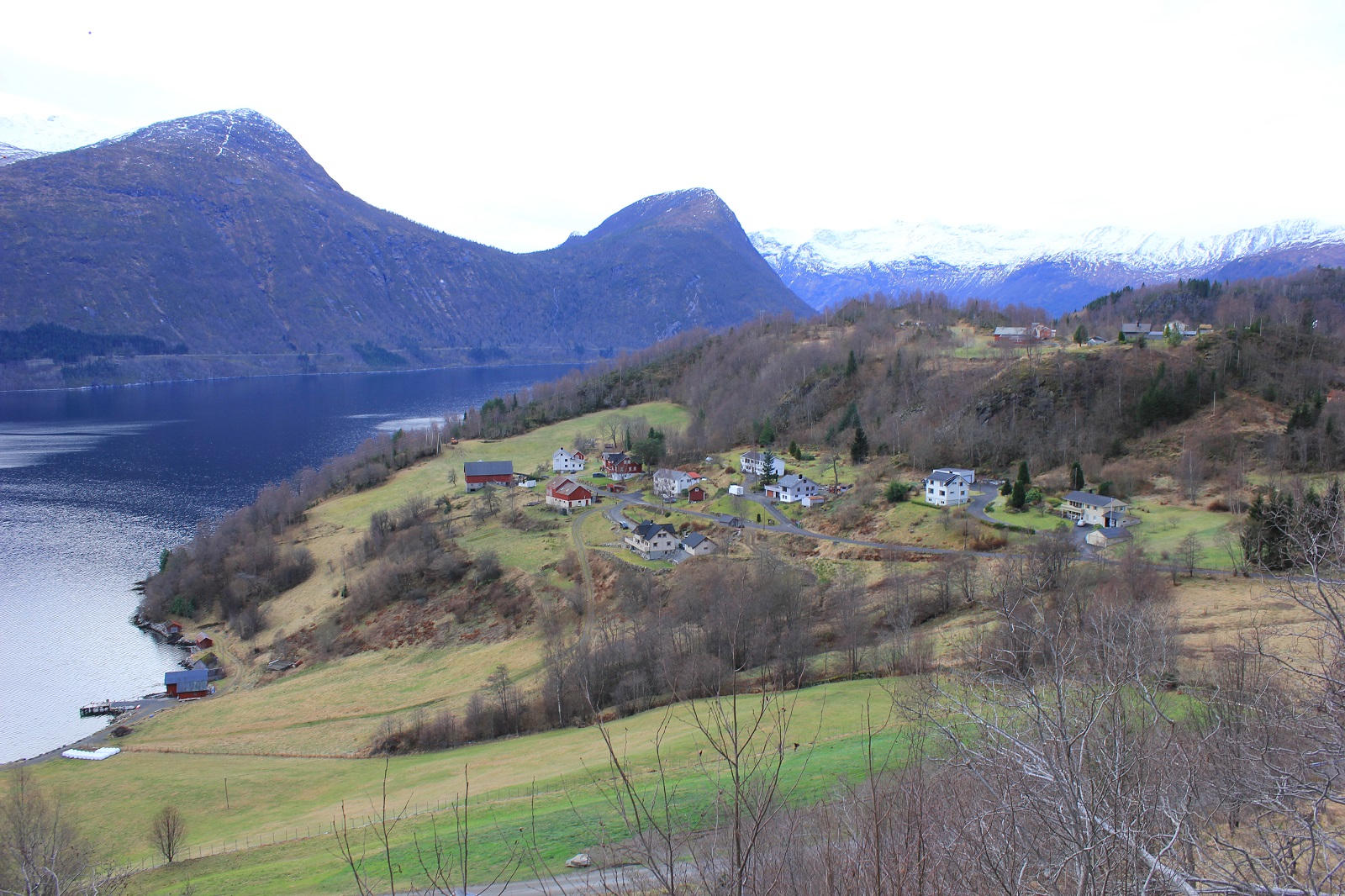
- View of the fjord and local landscape
- Interactive map of the fjord
- Location: Møre og Romsdal county, Norway
- Coordinates: 62.0871°N 6.1607°E
- Type: Fjord
- Primary inflows: Fyrdselva river
- Primary outflows: Voldsfjorden
- Basin countries: Norway
- Max. length: 11 kilometres (6.8 mi)
- Max. width: 2 kilometres (1.2 mi)
- Settlements: Fyrde

Austefjorden is a small fjord which branches off of the main Voldsfjorden in Volda Municipality in Møre og Romsdal county, Norway. The 11-kilometre (6.8 mi) long fjord lies in the Sunnmørsalpene mountains about 5 kilometres (3.1 mi) north of the mountain Eidskyrkja in the northeastern part of the municipality. The Austefjorden and the Kilsfjorden join together to form the Voldsfjorden. The village of Fyrde is located at the innermost part of the fjord. There are several small peninsulas and outcroppings that jut out into the fjord, giving the fjord a meandering S-shaped path.

== See also ==
- List of Norwegian fjords
