= Hareid Municipality =

Municipality in Møre og Romsdal, Norway

Hareid Municipality Hareid kommune
- Municipality
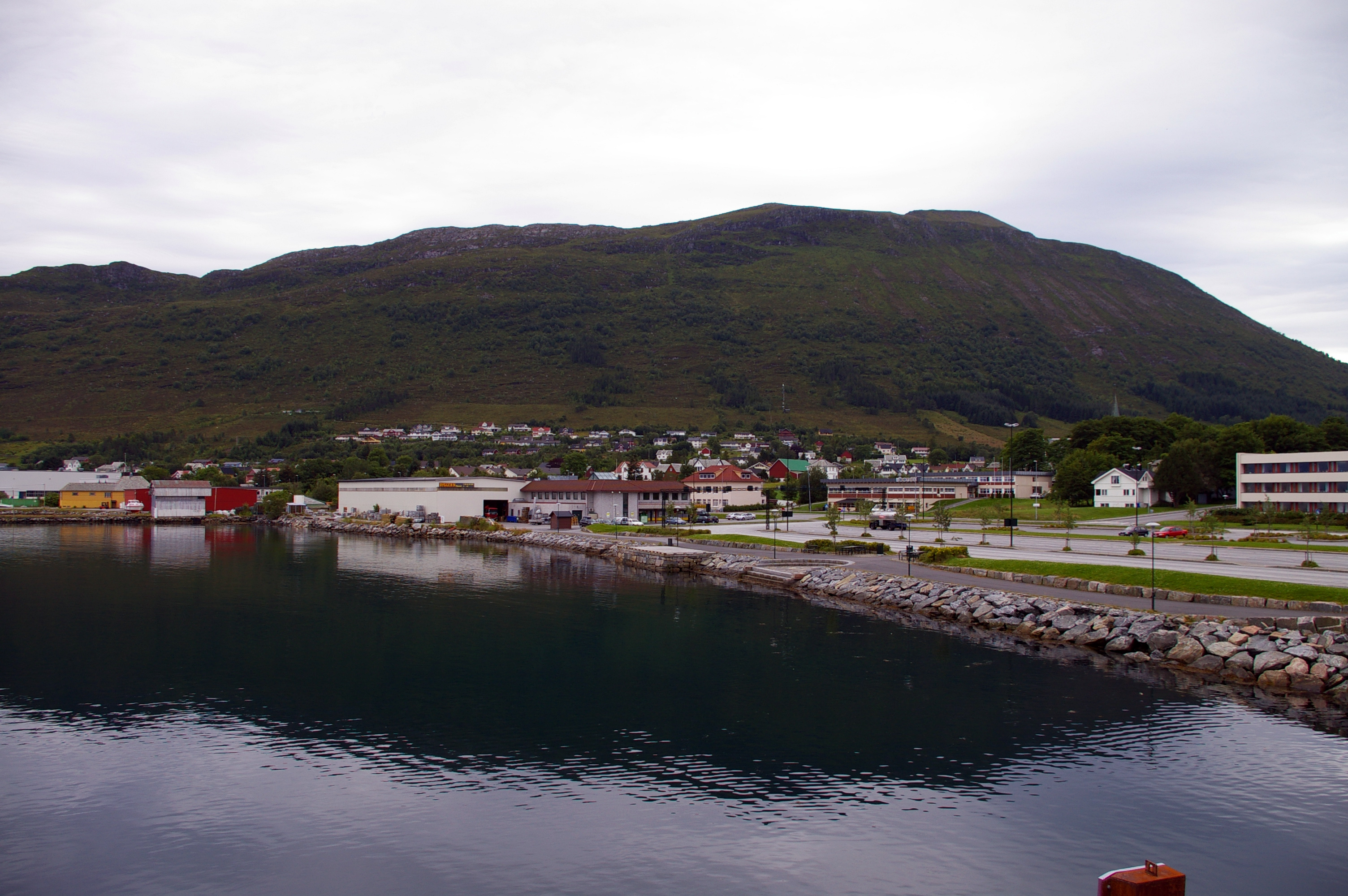

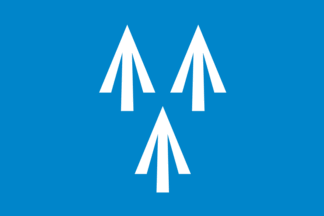
- Flag Coat of arms

- Møre og Romsdal within Norway

- Hareid within Møre og Romsdal
- Coordinates: 62°21′51″N 06°00′05″E
- Country: Norway
- County: Møre og Romsdal
- District: Sunnmøre
- Established: 1 Jan 1917
  - Preceded by: Ulstein Municipality
- Administrative centre: Hareid

Government
  - Mayor (2019): Bernt Brandal (LL)

Area
  - Total: 82.27 km^{2} (31.76 sq mi)
  - Land: 76.82 km^{2} (29.66 sq mi)
  - Water: 5.45 km^{2} (2.10 sq mi) 6.6%
  - Rank: #337 in Norway
- Highest elevation: 682.79 m (2,240.1 ft)

Population (2024)
  - Total: 5,322
  - Rank: #179 in Norway
  - Density: 64.7/km^{2} (168/sq mi)
  - Change (10 years): ▲ +6%
- Demonym: Hareidstøling

Official language
  - Norwegian form: Nynorsk
- Time zone: UTC+01:00 (CET)
  - Summer (DST): UTC+02:00 (CEST)
- ISO 3166 code: NO-1517
- Website: Official website

Hareid is a municipality in Møre og Romsdal county, Norway. It is part of the Sunnmøre region. The administrative centre is the village of Hareid. The other main population centers are Brandal and Hjørungavåg, known for the viking Battle of Hjörungavágr.

The municipality is situated off the mainland coast of Sunnmøre, on an island named Hareidlandet, which it shared with Ulstein Municipality, the commercial capital of the area. Hareid Municipality is regarded as the cultural capital with its annual Hareidsstemne and many choirs. It is also an important traffic hub in Sunnmøre and is connected by ferry to the neighboring island of Sula which in turn is connected to the city of Ålesund and the island of Valderøya. The municipality is connected to the mainland via the Eiksund Bridge and Eiksund Tunnel through the neighboring Ulstein Municipality.

The 82-square-kilometre (32 sq mi) municipality is the 337th largest by area out of the 357 municipalities in Norway. Hareid Municipality is the 179th most populous municipality in Norway with a population of 5,322. The municipality's population density is 64.7 inhabitants per square kilometre (168/sq mi) and its population has increased by 6% over the previous 10-year period.

== General information ==
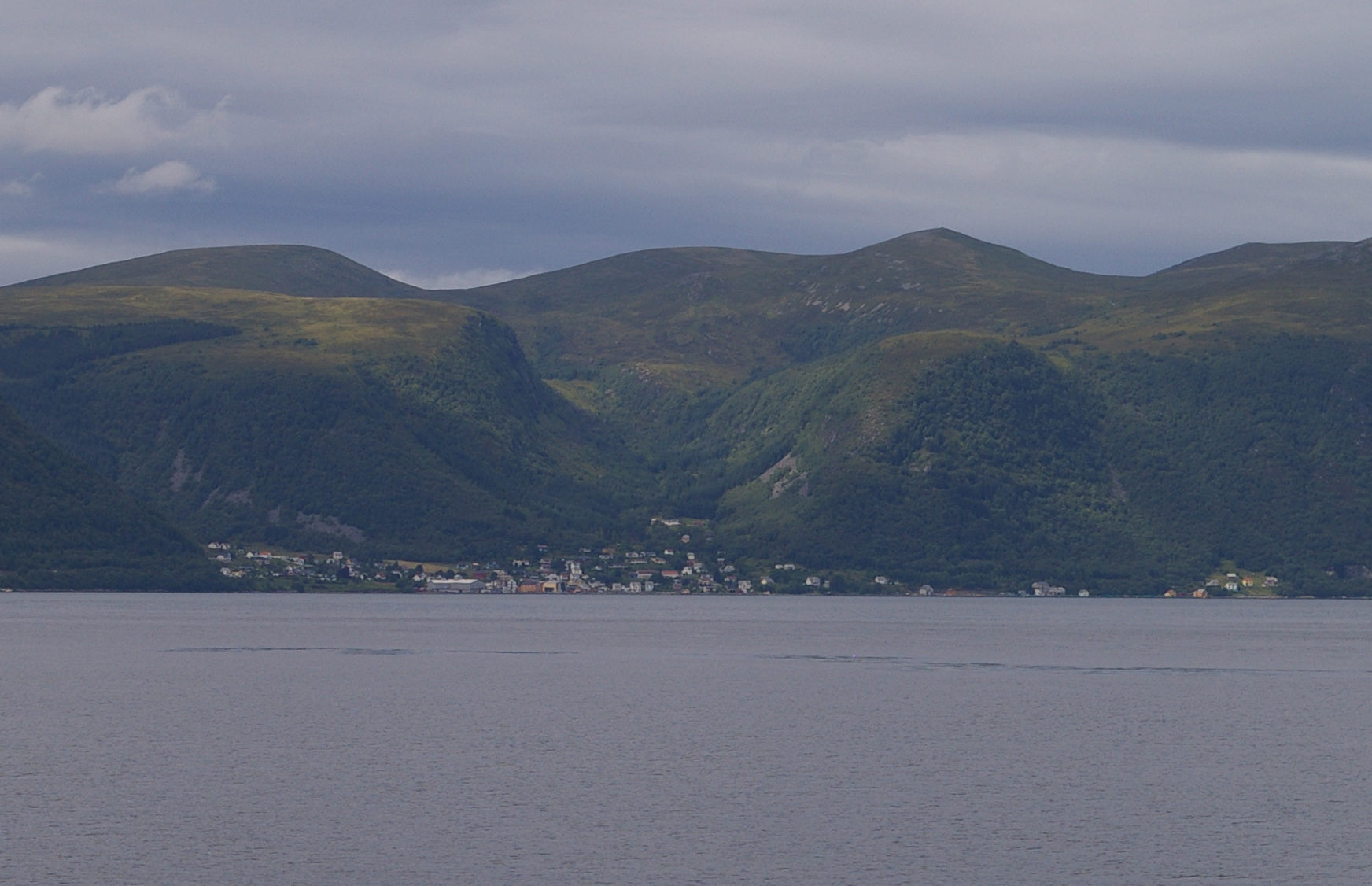
View of Brandal in Hareid

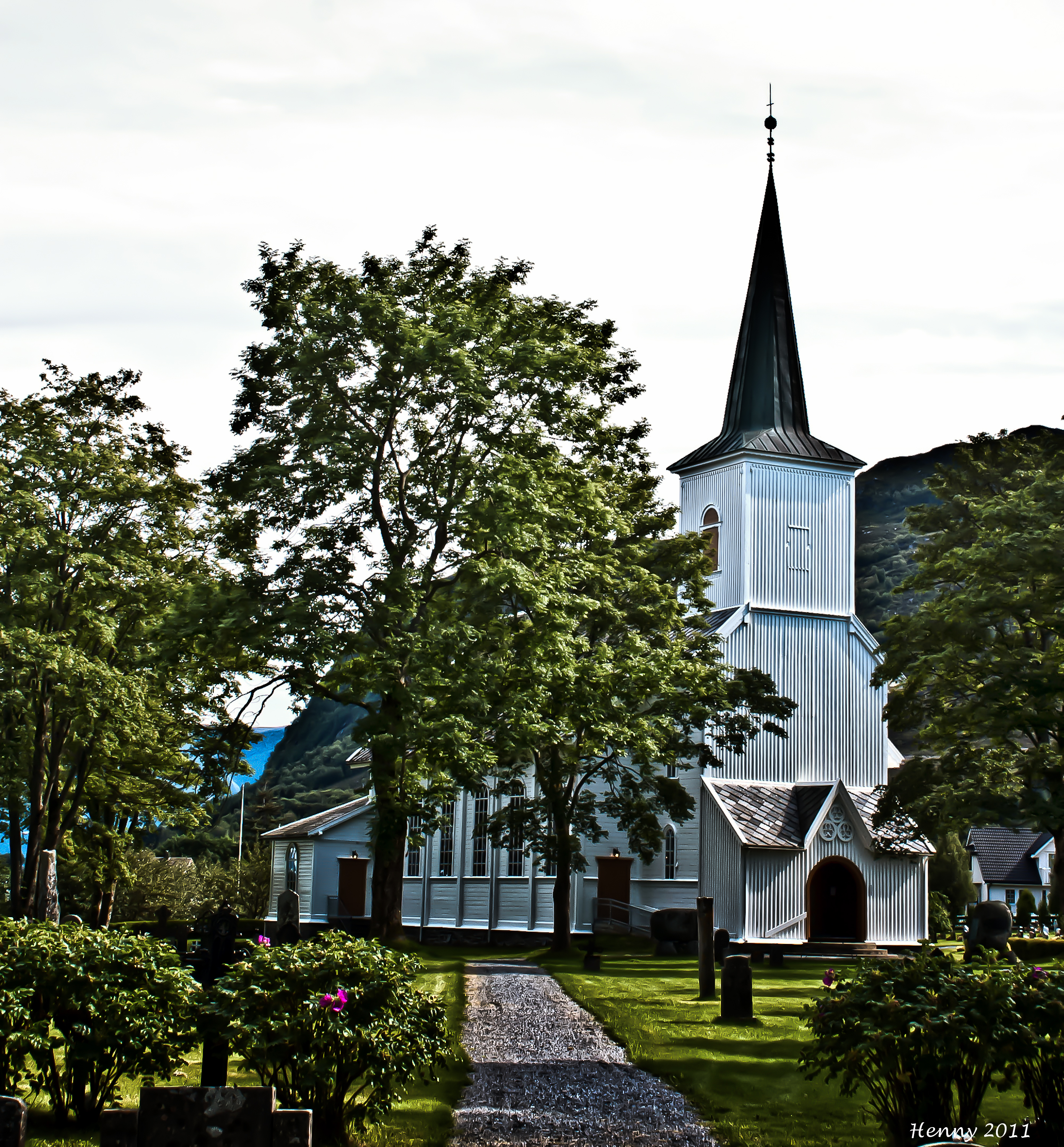
View of Hareid Church

The municipality of Hareid was established on 1 January 1917 when it was separated from Ulstein Municipality to form a municipality of its own. Originally, the municipality included the eastern part of Hareidlandet island and the southwestern part of the nearby island of Sula. The initial population of the municipality was 2,310. On 1 July 1958, the southwestern part of the island of Sula (population: 68) was transferred from Hareid Municipality to Borgund Municipality.

=== Name ===
The municipality (originally the parish) is named after the old Hareid farm (Old Norse: Haðareið), since the first Hareid Church was built there. The first element is the genitive case of the name of the island Hǫð (now Hareidlandet). The meaning of the old island name is uncertain, but it is speculated that it might be connected to the Norse god, Höðr. The last element is eið which means "isthmus".

=== Coat of arms ===
The coat of arms was granted on 11 January 1985. The official blazon is "Azure, three arrowheads argent points to chief" (Norwegian: På blå grunn tre opprette sølv piloddar, to over ein). This means the arms have a blue field (background) and the charge is three arrowhead symbols that are pointing upwards. The charge has a tincture of argent which means it is commonly colored white, but if it is made out of metal, then silver is used. The arrowheads were chosen as a symbol for the Battle of Hjörungavágr in 986, in which Earl Håkon defeated the Danish Vikings. This battle played an important role in the struggle by Håkon to unite the whole of Norway. Since the battle took place in the municipality, the arrowheads were considered an appropriate symbol. The arms were designed by Jarle Skuseth. The municipal flag has the same design as the coat of arms.

=== Churches ===
The Church of Norway has one parish (sokn) within Hareid Municipality. It is part of the Søre Sunnmøre prosti (deanery) in the Diocese of Møre.

Churches in Hareid Municipality
Parish (sokn)	Church name	Location of the church	Year built
Hareid	Hareid Church	Hareid	1877

== Geography ==
The municipality lies on the eastern part of the island of Hareidlandet. The highest point in the municipality is the 682.79-metre (2,240.1 ft) tall mountain Laupen, located on the border with Ulstein Municipality to the west. The island municipality is surrounded by Giske Municipality to the north, Sula Municipality to the east, and Ørsta Municipality to the south. The only shared land border is with Ulstein Municipality to the west.

== Government ==
Hareid Municipality is responsible for primary education (through 10th grade), outpatient health services, senior citizen services, welfare and other social services, zoning, economic development, and municipal roads and utilities. The municipality is governed by a municipal council of directly elected representatives. The mayor is indirectly elected by a vote of the municipal council. The municipality is under the jurisdiction of the Sunnmøre District Court and the Frostating Court of Appeal.

=== Municipal council ===
The municipal council (Kommunestyre) of Hareid Municipality is made up of 21 representatives that are elected to four year terms. The tables below show the current and historical composition of the council by political party.

Hareid kommunestyre 2023–2027
Party name (in Nynorsk)	Number of representatives
Labour Party (Arbeidarpartiet)	2
Progress Party (Framstegspartiet)	3
Conservative Party (Høgre)	2
Industry and Business Party (Industri‑ og Næringspartiet)	2
Liberal Party (Venstre)	1
People's list for Hareid (Folkelista for Hareid)	11
Total number of members:	21

Hareid kommunestyre 2019–2023
Party name (in Nynorsk)	Number of representatives
Labour Party (Arbeidarpartiet)	3
Progress Party (Framstegspartiet)	7
Conservative Party (Høgre)	2
Christian Democratic Party (Kristeleg Folkeparti)	1
Liberal Party (Venstre)	3
People's list for Hareid (Folkelista for Hareid)	5
Total number of members:	21

Hareid kommunestyre 2015–2019
Party name (in Nynorsk)	Number of representatives
Labour Party (Arbeidarpartiet)	3
Progress Party (Framstegspartiet)	4
Conservative Party (Høgre)	5
Christian Democratic Party (Kristeleg Folkeparti)	2
Liberal Party (Venstre)	2
People's list for Hareid (Folkelista for Hareid)	5
Total number of members:	21

Hareid kommunestyre 2011–2015
Party name (in Nynorsk)	Number of representatives
Labour Party (Arbeidarpartiet)	2
Progress Party (Framstegspartiet)	4
Conservative Party (Høgre)	5
Christian Democratic Party (Kristeleg Folkeparti)	2
Liberal Party (Venstre)	3
People's list for Hareid (Folkelista for Hareid)	5
Total number of members:	21

Hareid kommunestyre 2007–2011
Party name (in Nynorsk)	Number of representatives
Labour Party (Arbeidarpartiet)	3
Progress Party (Framstegspartiet)	4
Conservative Party (Høgre)	4
Christian Democratic Party (Kristeleg Folkeparti)	1
Socialist Left Party (Sosialistisk Venstreparti)	1
Liberal Party (Venstre)	3
People's list for Hareid municipality (Folkelista for Hareid kommune)	5
Total number of members:	21

Hareid kommunestyre 2003–2007
Party name (in Nynorsk)	Number of representatives
Labour Party (Arbeidarpartiet)	2
Progress Party (Framstegspartiet)	7
Conservative Party (Høgre)	3
Christian Democratic Party (Kristeleg Folkeparti)	2
Socialist Left Party (Sosialistisk Venstreparti)	1
Liberal Party (Venstre)	7
Cross-party election list in Hareid (Tverrpolitisk valliste i Hareid)	3
Total number of members:	25

Hareid kommunestyre 1999–2003
Party name (in Nynorsk)	Number of representatives
Labour Party (Arbeidarpartiet)	2
Progress Party (Framstegspartiet)	5
Conservative Party (Høgre)	4
Christian Democratic Party (Kristeleg Folkeparti)	3
Centre Party (Senterpartiet)	1
Socialist Left Party (Sosialistisk Venstreparti)	1
Liberal Party (Venstre)	5
Cross-party list (Tverrpolitisk liste)	4
Total number of members:	25

Hareid kommunestyre 1995–1999
Party name (in Nynorsk)	Number of representatives
Labour Party (Arbeidarpartiet)	3
Progress Party (Framstegspartiet)	4
Conservative Party (Høgre)	4
Christian Democratic Party (Kristeleg Folkeparti)	3
Centre Party (Senterpartiet)	2
Socialist Left Party (Sosialistisk Venstreparti)	1
Liberal Party (Venstre)	2
Cross-party list (Tverrpolitisk liste)	6
Total number of members:	25

Hareid kommunestyre 1991–1995
Party name (in Nynorsk)	Number of representatives
Labour Party (Arbeidarpartiet)	4
Progress Party (Framstegspartiet)	2
Conservative Party (Høgre)	2
Christian Democratic Party (Kristeleg Folkeparti)	3
Centre Party (Senterpartiet)	2
Socialist Left Party (Sosialistisk Venstreparti)	1
Liberal Party (Venstre)	2
Cross-party list (Tverrpolitisk liste)	9
Total number of members:	25

Hareid kommunestyre 1987–1991
Party name (in Nynorsk)	Number of representatives
Labour Party (Arbeidarpartiet)	4
Conservative Party (Høgre)	6
Christian Democratic Party (Kristeleg Folkeparti)	5
Centre Party (Senterpartiet)	2
Socialist Left Party (Sosialistisk Venstreparti)	1
Liberal Party (Venstre)	7
Total number of members:	25

Hareid kommunestyre 1983–1987
Party name (in Nynorsk)	Number of representatives
Labour Party (Arbeidarpartiet)	4
Conservative Party (Høgre)	7
Christian Democratic Party (Kristeleg Folkeparti)	5
Centre Party (Senterpartiet)	2
Socialist Left Party (Sosialistisk Venstreparti)	1
Liberal Party (Venstre)	6
Total number of members:	25

Hareid kommunestyre 1979–1983
Party name (in Nynorsk)	Number of representatives
Labour Party (Arbeidarpartiet)	3
Conservative Party (Høgre)	6
Christian Democratic Party (Kristeleg Folkeparti)	5
Centre Party (Senterpartiet)	2
Liberal Party (Venstre)	5
Total number of members:	21

Hareid kommunestyre 1975–1979
Party name (in Nynorsk)	Number of representatives
Labour Party (Arbeidarpartiet)	3
Conservative Party (Høgre)	5
Christian Democratic Party (Kristeleg Folkeparti)	5
Centre Party (Senterpartiet)	4
Liberal Party (Venstre)	4
Total number of members:	21

Hareid kommunestyre 1971–1975
Party name (in Nynorsk)	Number of representatives
Labour Party (Arbeidarpartiet)	4
Conservative Party (Høgre)	3
Christian Democratic Party (Kristeleg Folkeparti)	4
Centre Party (Senterpartiet)	2
Liberal Party (Venstre)	4
Local List(s) (Lokale lister)	4
Total number of members:	21

Hareid kommunestyre 1967–1971
Party name (in Nynorsk)	Number of representatives
Labour Party (Arbeidarpartiet)	4
Conservative Party (Høgre)	3
Christian Democratic Party (Kristeleg Folkeparti)	5
Centre Party (Senterpartiet)	2
Liberal Party (Venstre)	5
Local List(s) (Lokale lister)	2
Total number of members:	21

Hareid kommunestyre 1963–1967
Party name (in Nynorsk)	Number of representatives
Labour Party (Arbeidarpartiet)	3
Conservative Party (Høgre)	2
Christian Democratic Party (Kristeleg Folkeparti)	5
Centre Party (Senterpartiet)	3
Liberal Party (Venstre)	6
Local List(s) (Lokale lister)	2
Total number of members:	21

Hareid heradsstyre 1959–1963
Party name (in Nynorsk)	Number of representatives
Labour Party (Arbeidarpartiet)	1
Local List(s) (Lokale lister)	20
Total number of members:	21

Hareid heradsstyre 1955–1959
Party name (in Nynorsk)	Number of representatives
Labour Party (Arbeidarpartiet)	2
Local List(s) (Lokale lister)	19
Total number of members:	21

Hareid heradsstyre 1951–1955
Party name (in Nynorsk)	Number of representatives
Labour Party (Arbeidarpartiet)	3
Local List(s) (Lokale lister)	17
Total number of members:	20

Hareid heradsstyre 1947–1951
Party name (in Nynorsk)	Number of representatives
Labour Party (Arbeidarpartiet)	3
Local List(s) (Lokale lister)	17
Total number of members:	20

Hareid heradsstyre 1945–1947
Party name (in Nynorsk)	Number of representatives
Labour Party (Arbeidarpartiet)	3
Local List(s) (Lokale lister)	17
Total number of members:	20

Hareid heradsstyre 1937–1941*
Party name (in Nynorsk)	Number of representatives
Labour Party (Arbeidarpartiet)	4
Local List(s) (Lokale lister)	16
Total number of members:	20
Note: Due to the German occupation of Norway during World War II, no elections were held for new municipal councils until after the war ended in 1945.

=== Mayors ===
The mayor (Nynorsk: ordførar) of Hareid Municipality is the political leader of the municipality and the chairperson of the municipal council. Here is a list of people who have held this position:

- 1917–1925: Arne I. Grimstad
- 1926–1941: Randulf R. Rise
- 1941–1942: Hans Dybhavn (NS)
- 1942–1945: Asbjørn Riise (NS)
- 1945–1945: Bernhard Harkjerr
- 1946–1947: Martin Karlsen
- 1948–1951: Joakim P. Måseide
- 1952–1955: Håkon A. Riise (Ap)
- 1956–1967: Sverre A. Riise (Sp)
- 1968–1971: Ola L. Grønevet (V)
- 1972–1976: Endre Hareide (KrF)
- 1976–1983: Einar Holm (V)
- 1984–1987: Olav Fure (KrF)
- 1988–1990: Johan E. Hareide (H)
- 1990–1991: Olav Fure (KrF)
- 1992–1999: Einar Holm (V)
- 1999–2007: Gunn Berit Gjerde (V)
- 2007–2011: Hans Gisle Holstad (Ap)
- 2011–2019: Anders Riise (H)
- 2019–present: Bernt Brandal (LL)

== Economy ==
=== Primary industries ===
Primary industries such as fisheries and agriculture have traditionally been important ways of life in Hareid, and continue to be so for some of the population.

=== Industry ===
In recent years Hareid has developed into a modern industrial municipality with a variety of industries, including furniture, fish farming, offshore and subsea ship systems, and other manufacturers of ship equipment. Many Hareid companies specialize in manufacturing maritime equipment and components, and are part of the maritime cluster of Sunnmøre. Such clusters are considered by the EU to be powerful engines of economic development and drivers for innovation in Europe.

==== Industrial companies ====
- Ekornes (furniture)
- Hareid Group (electrical systems)
- Jets (vacuum sanitation)
- Kvalsvik Produksjon (kitchen furniture)
- Libra Plast (ship doors)
- Norway Pelagic (fish processing plant)
- Rolls-Royce Marine (maritime equipment)
- Spenncon (precast concrete)
- Stromek (maritime equipment)
- Vital Base (specialized pillows and cushions)

== Education ==
The village of Hareid is home to Hareid elementary school and Hareid junior high school, with two more elementary schools in more rural parts of the municipality.

- Hareid elementary school, grades 1 through 7
- Bigset elementary school, grades 1 through 7
- Hjørungavåg elementary school, grades 1 through 7
- Hareid junior high school, grades 8 through 10

After finishing junior high school in Hareid, students can complete a high school education in one of Hareid's neighbouring communities such as Ulsteinvik or Ålesund.

== Notable people ==
- Marie Lovise Widnes (born 1930), a poet, author, singer, composer, and local politician in Hareid
- Kjell Magne Yri (born 1943 in Hareid), a priest, linguist, and translator
- Åge Hareide (born 1953 in Hareid), a former footballer with 266 club caps and 50 for Norway and national team manager for Norway from 2003–2008, and Denmark for 2016–2020
- Fredrik Aursnes (born 1995 in Hareid), a footballer with over 240 club caps
