= Volda (village) =

Village in Volda Municipality, Norway

- Village
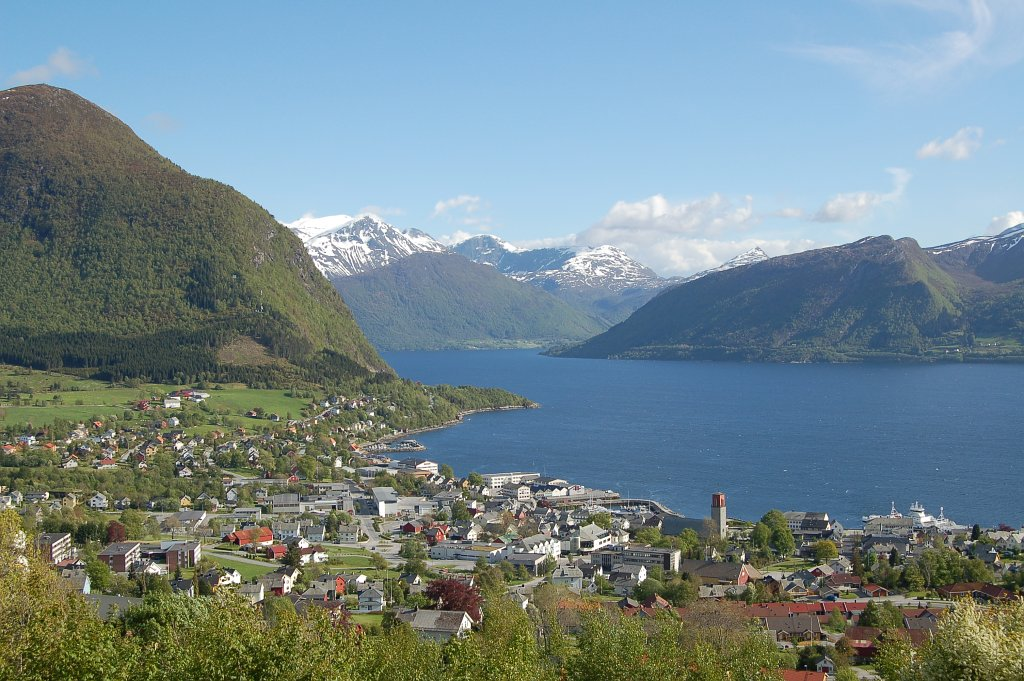
- View of the village
- Interactive map of Volda
- Location within Møre og Romsdal Location within Norway
- Coordinates: 62.1460°N 6.0711°E
- Country: Norway
- Region: Western Norway
- County: Møre og Romsdal
- District: Sunnmøre
- Municipality: Volda

Area
  - Total: 3.78 km^{2} (1.46 sq mi)
- Elevation: 9 m (30 ft)

Population (2024)
  - Total: 7,143
  - Density: 1,890/km^{2} (4,900/sq mi)
- Time zone: UTC+01:00 (CET)
  - Summer (DST): UTC+02:00 (CEST)
- Post Code: 6100 Volda

Volda is the administrative centre of Volda Municipality, in Møre og Romsdal county, Norway. The village is located on the northeastern shore of the Voldsfjorden, just less than 10 kilometres (6.2 mi) south of the village of Ørsta.

The 3.78-square-kilometre (930-acre) village has a population (2024) of 7,143 and a population density of 1,890 inhabitants per square kilometre (4,900/sq mi).

Volda is home to the municipal administration, municipal schools, and the regional hospital. Volda University College is located there; the college enrolls about 3,000 students and specializes in education of teachers, animators, documentarists, and journalists. Volda has a shopping center as well as some industry. Volda Church is located in the central part of the village. The local newspaper is Avisa Møre. The Møre og Romsdal District Court has a court in Volda and the Søre Sunnmøre prosti (church deanery) is based in Volda.

The Ørsta–Volda Airport lies at Hovden, a site between the two villages of Volda and Ørsta, along the European route E39 highway which runs through both villages. There are also ferry connections to villages across the Voldsfjorden, linking Volda northwest to Lauvstad and southwest to Folkestad.

== Media gallery ==
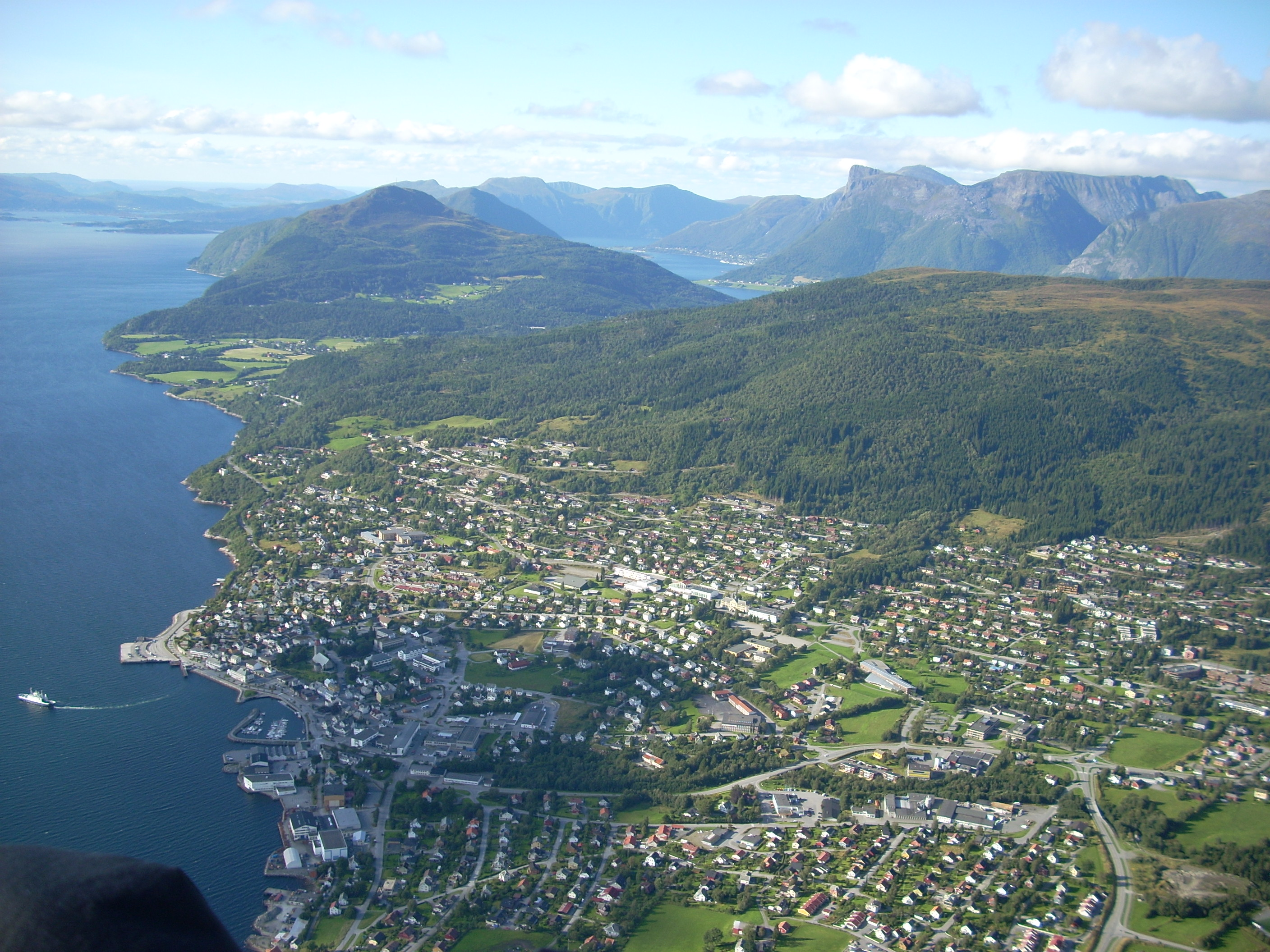

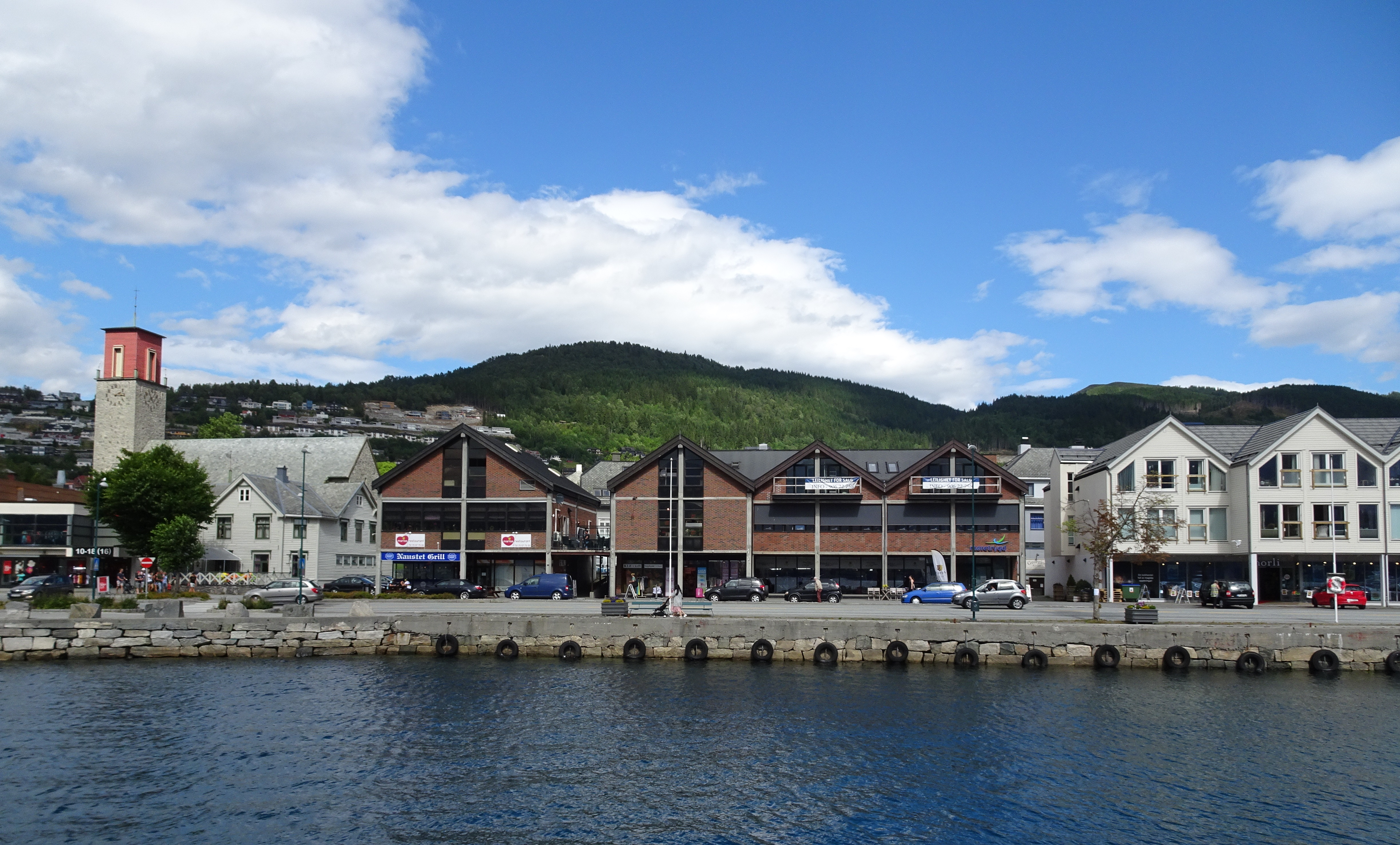

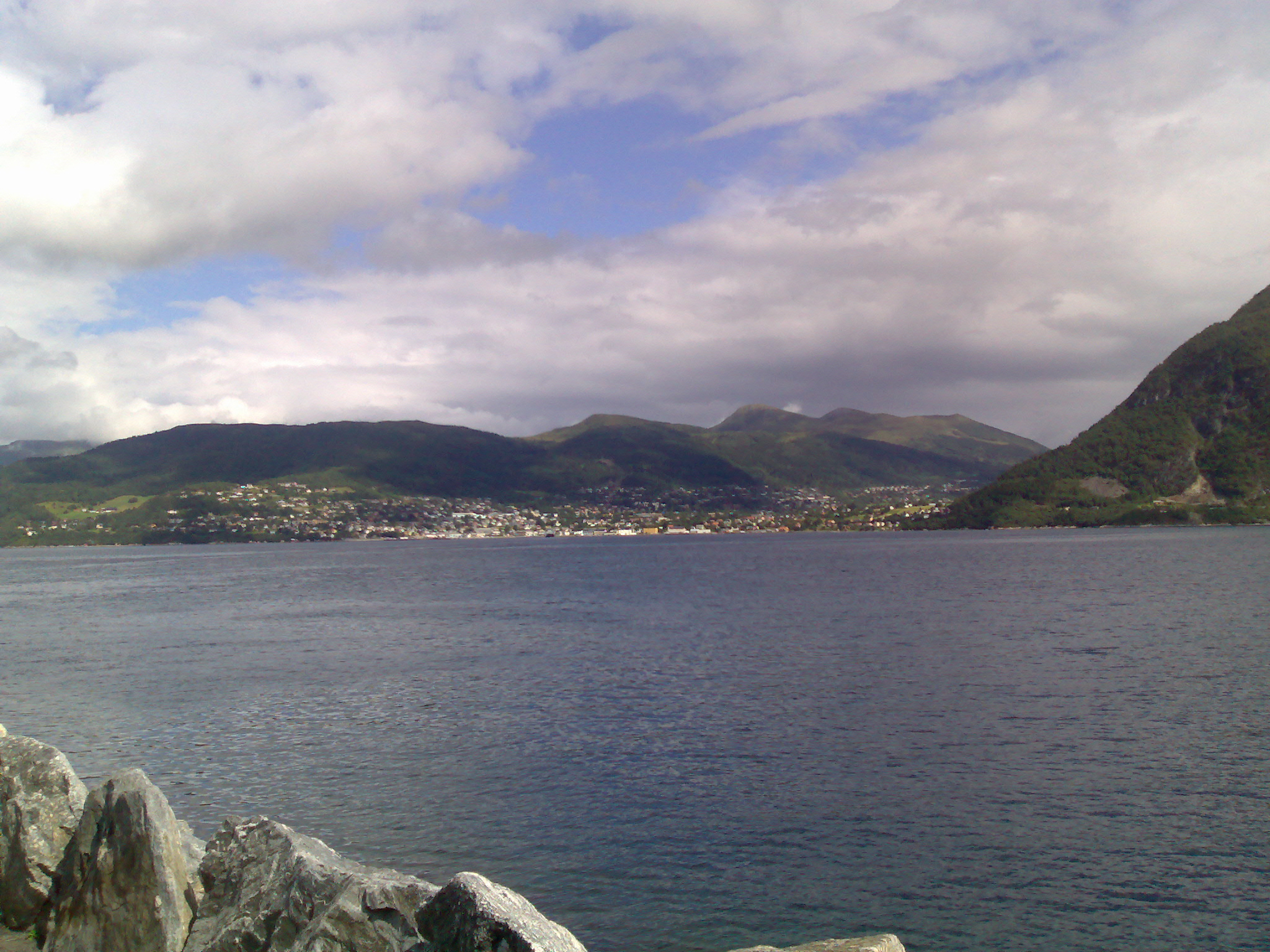

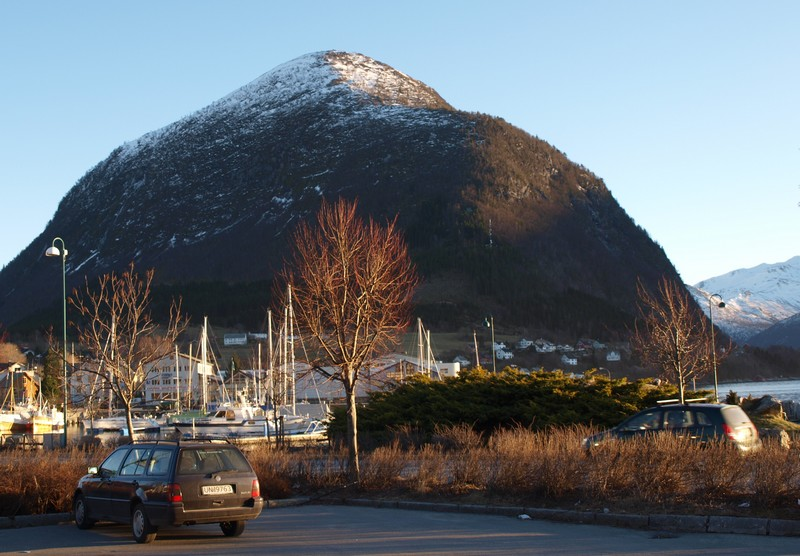

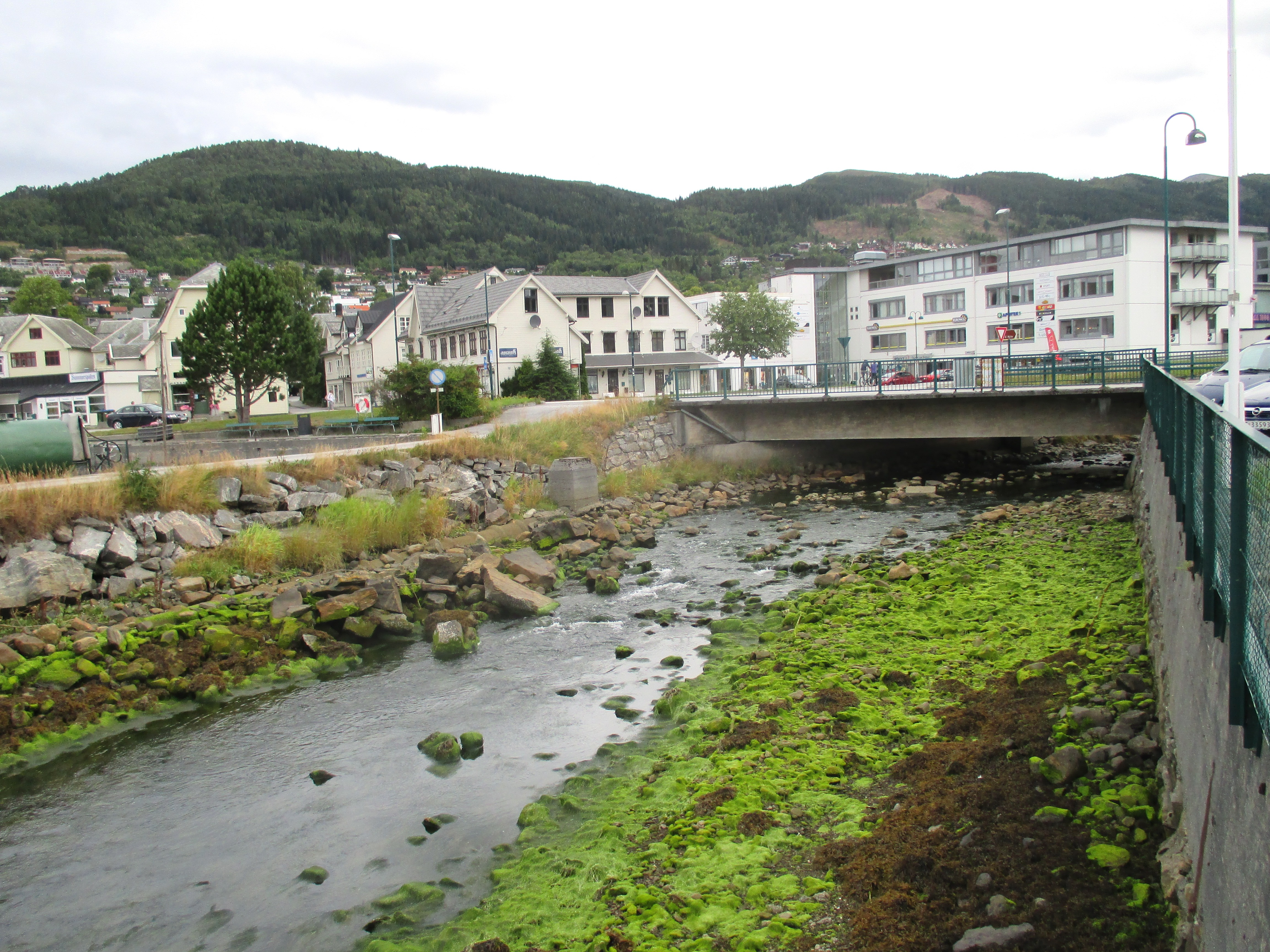

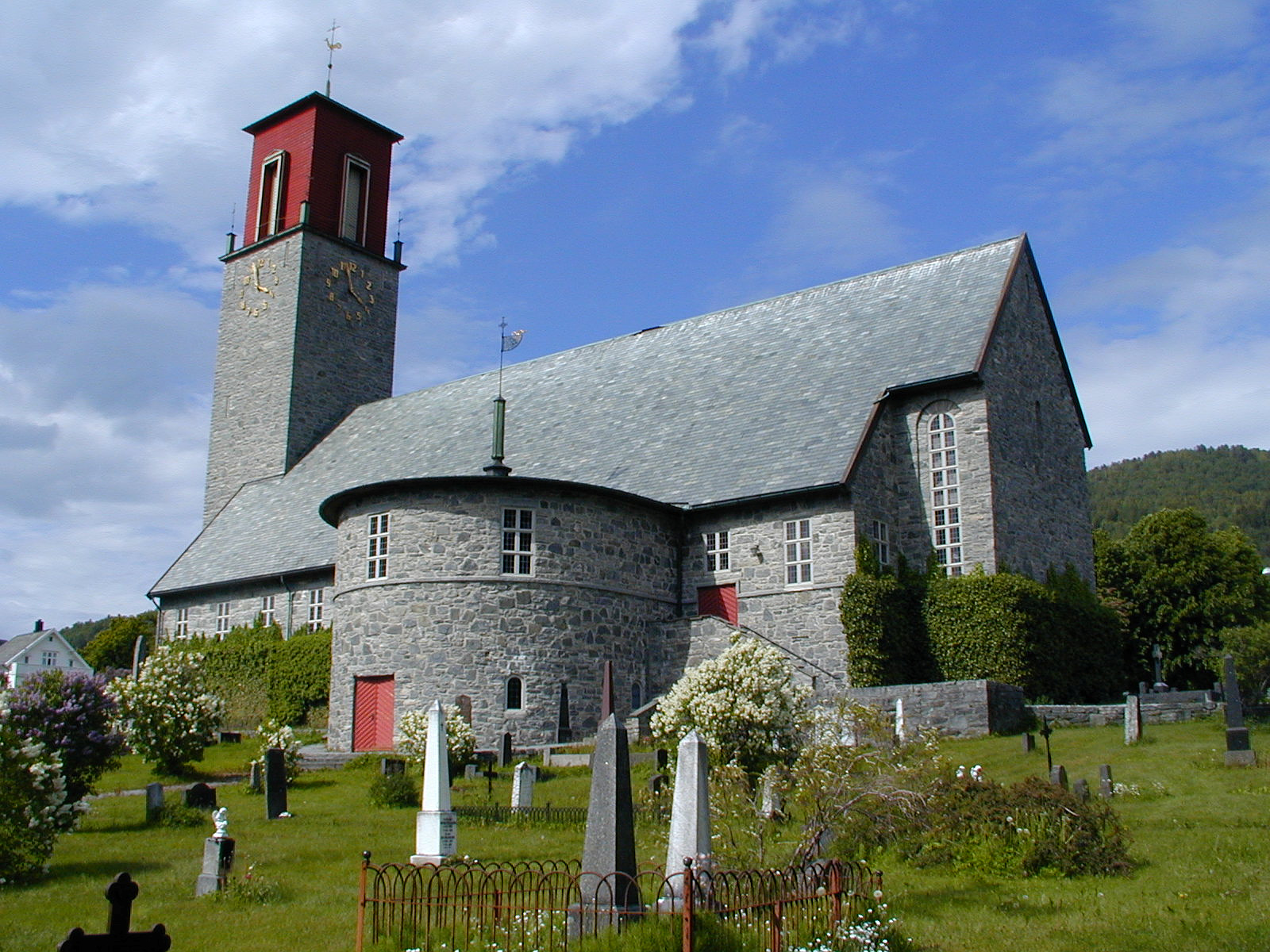
