= Voldsfjorden =

Fjord in Volda, Norway

- Voldafjorden
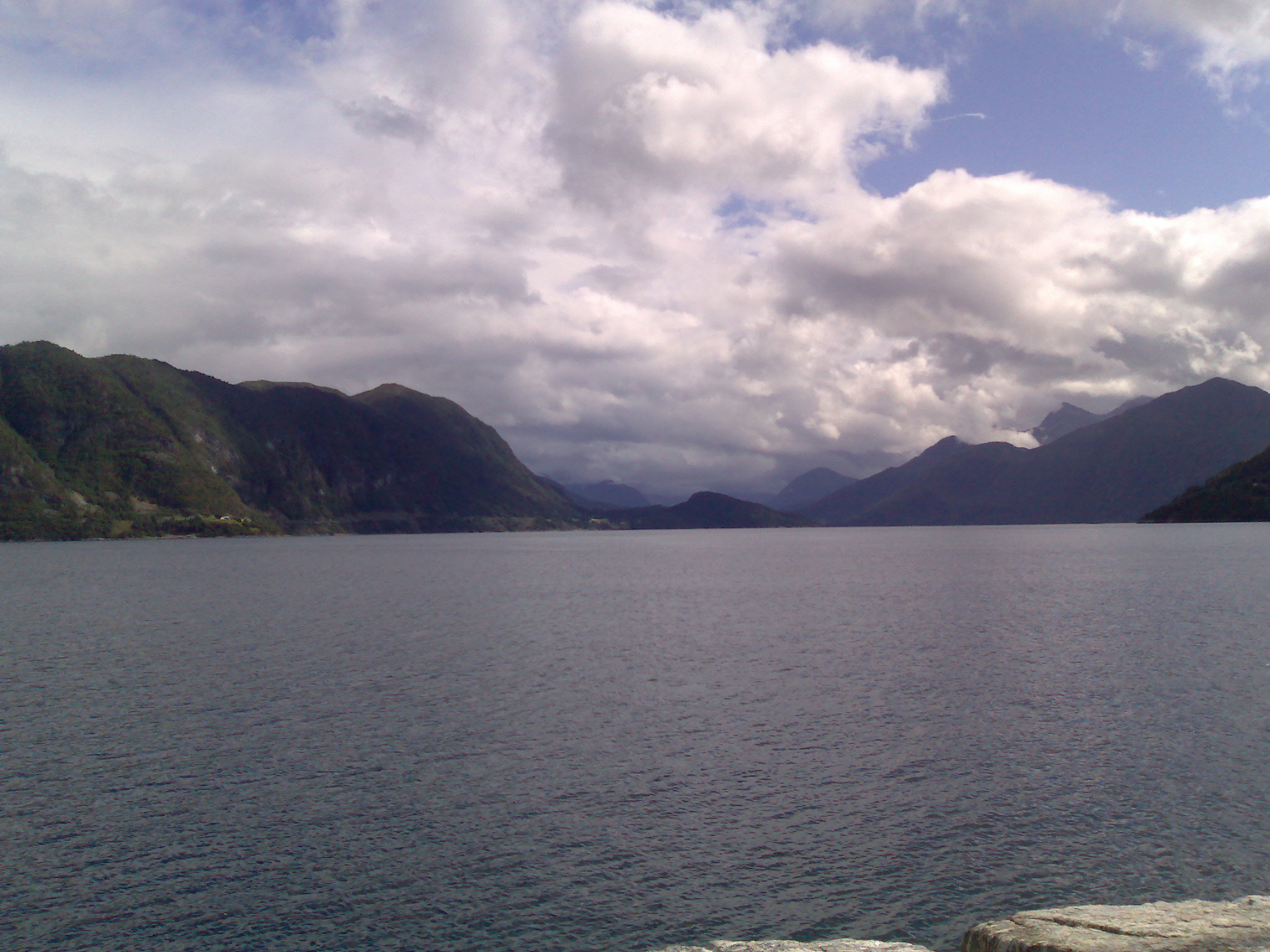
- View of the fjord
- Interactive map of the fjord
- Location: Møre og Romsdal county, Norway
- Coordinates: 62.153637°N 5.995045°E
- Type: Fjord
- Primary inflows: Austefjorden, Kilsfjorden, Dalsfjorden
- Primary outflows: Vartdalsfjorden, Rovdefjorden
- Basin countries: Norway
- Max. length: 18 kilometres (11 mi)
- Max. depth: 697 metres (2,287 ft)
- Settlements: Volda

Voldsfjorden is a fjord in Volda Municipality in Møre og Romsdal county, Norway. The 18-kilometre (11 mi) long fjord begins at the confluence of the Austefjorden and the Kilsfjorden.

The Voldsfjorden reaches a maximum depth of 697 metres (2,287 ft) below sea level, making it the deepest fjord in all of Sunnmøre. The fjord cuts into the mainland of Norway and it is surrounded by the Sunnmørsalpene mountains. The Dalsfjorden branches off the Voldsfjorden just south of the village of Lauvstad.

The main urban area along the fjord is the village of Volda, located on the east side of the fjord. The European route E39 highway runs along the shore of part of the fjord. The fjord is crossed by two ferries going from Lauvstad to Volda, and Folkestad to Volda.

== See also ==
- List of Norwegian fjords
