= Kilsfjord, Møre og Romsdal =

Fjord in Volda, Møre og Romsdal, Norway

Kilsfjorden
- Interactive map of the fjord
- Location: Møre og Romsdal county, Norway
- Coordinates: 62.0808°N 6.0885°E
- Type: Fjord
- Primary inflows: Kilspollen
- Primary outflows: Voldsfjorden
- Basin countries: Norway
- Max. length: 3 kilometres (1.9 mi)
- Max. width: 1.5 kilometres (0.93 mi)
- Settlements: Straumshamn

Kilsfjorden is a fjord in Volda Municipality in Møre og Romsdal county, Norway. It is located in the central part of the municipality, about 6 kilometres (3.7 mi) east of the Dalsfjorden. The Kilsfjorden is located in the Sunnmørsalpene mountains and it flows north and joins the Austefjorden to form the Voldsfjorden. The village of Straumshamn lies on the southwestern coast of the fjord, at the entrance to the Kilspollen, a nearly 3-kilometre (1.9 mi) long inlet that comes off of the Kilsfjorden.

== See also ==
- List of Norwegian fjords
