= Frostating Court of Appeal =

Court in Norway

- Frostating lagmannsrett
- Seal of the Frostating Court of Appeal

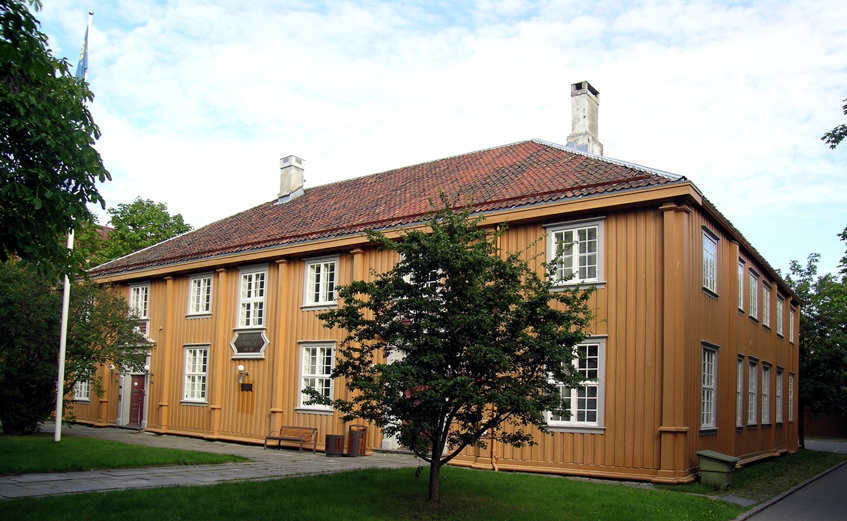
- The former court building at Kalvskinnet in Trondheim
- Interactive map of Frostating Court of Appeal
- 63°25′46″N 10°23′42″E
- Established: 1 Jan 1936
- Jurisdiction: Trøndelag and Møre og Romsdal
- Location: Trondheim, Norway
- Coordinates: 63°25′46″N 10°23′42″E
- Composition method: Court of Appeal
- Appeals to: Supreme Court of Norway
- Appeals from: District Courts
- Number of positions: 19
- Annual budget: 22.7 million kr
- Website: Official website

Chief Judge (Førstelagmann)
- Currently: Sven-Jørgen Lindsetmo

The Frostating Court of Appeal (Norwegian: Frostating lagmannsrett) is one of six courts of appeal in the Kingdom of Norway. The Court is located in the city of Trondheim. The court has jurisdiction over the counties of Trøndelag and Møre og Romsdal. These areas constitute the Frostating judicial district (Norwegian: Frostating lagdømme). This court can rule on both civil and criminal cases that are appealed from one of its subordinate district courts. Court decisions can be, to a limited extent, appealed to the Supreme Court of Norway. There are 19 permanent judges on this court. The chief judicial officer of the court (Norwegian: førstelagmann) is currently Sven-Jørgen Lindsetmo. The court is administered by the Norwegian National Courts Administration.

== Location ==
The Court has its seat in the city of Trondheim, the largest city in Central Norway. Additionally, the Court permanently sits in the towns of Ålesund, Molde, and Kristiansund. The Court may also sit in other places within its jurisdiction as needed.

== Jurisdiction ==
This court accepts appeals from all of the district courts from its geographic jurisdiction. This court is divided into judicial regions (Norwegian: lagsogn) and there is one or more district courts (Norwegian: tingrett) that belongs to each of these regions.

Judicial Regions (lagsogner)	District courts (tingretter)
Møre og Romsdal	Sunnmøre District Court; Nordmøre og Romsdal District Court
Trööndelagen/Trøndelag	Trøndelag District Court

== History ==
The Frostating court stems back to the traditional thing called the Frostating that was created in the mid-10th century. The current court was transformed from an assembly to a court during the Middle Ages. These courts have changed their names and locations over time and became pawns in the absolute monarchy. The old Frostating was dissolved in 1797, and a new court of appeal in Trondheim took its place.

In 1890, a new law took effect that created several new courts of appeal across Norway. On 1 January 1890 the Frostating Court of Appeal was established, hut it did not last long. In 1892, some courts were consolidated. The Trøndelag area became part of the new Eidsiva- og Frostating Court of Appeal and the Møre og Romsdal area became part of the Gulating Court of Appeal. In 1908, the court jurisdictions were re-arranged again and Trøndelag was moved to the Gulating Court of Appeal and at the same time, that court was renamed the Gula- og Frostating Court of Appeal. On 1 July 1936, that court was divided into the present Gulating Court of Appeal (including Rogaland, Hordaland, and Sogn og Fjordane in the south) and the present Frostating Court of Appeal (including Trøndelag and Møre og Romsdal in the north).
