= Tin tabernacle =

Prefabricated church buildings made from corrugated, galvanised iron

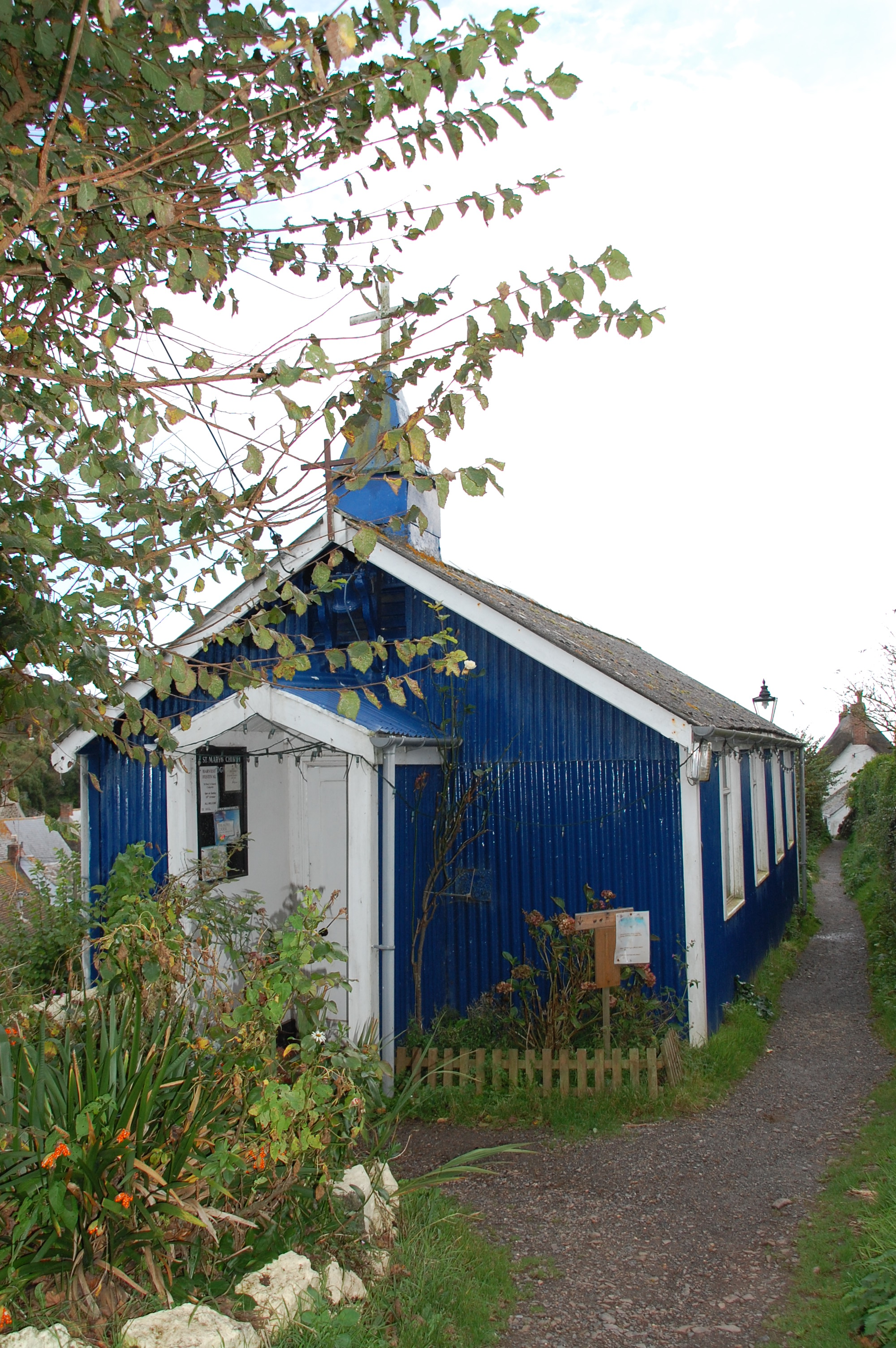
St Mary's Church at Cadgwith in Cornwall, a blue-painted "tin church".

A tin tabernacle, also known as an iron church, is a type of prefabricated ecclesiastical building made from corrugated galvanised iron. They were developed in the mid-19th century, initially in the United Kingdom. Corrugated iron was first used for roofing in London in 1829 by civil engineer Henry Robinson Palmer, and the patent was later sold to Richard Walker who advertised "portable buildings for export" in 1832. The technology for producing the corrugated sheets improved and, to prevent corrosion, the sheets were galvanised with a coating of zinc, a process developed by Stanislas Sorel in Paris in the 1830s. After 1850, many types of prefabricated buildings were produced, including churches, chapels and mission halls.

== History ==
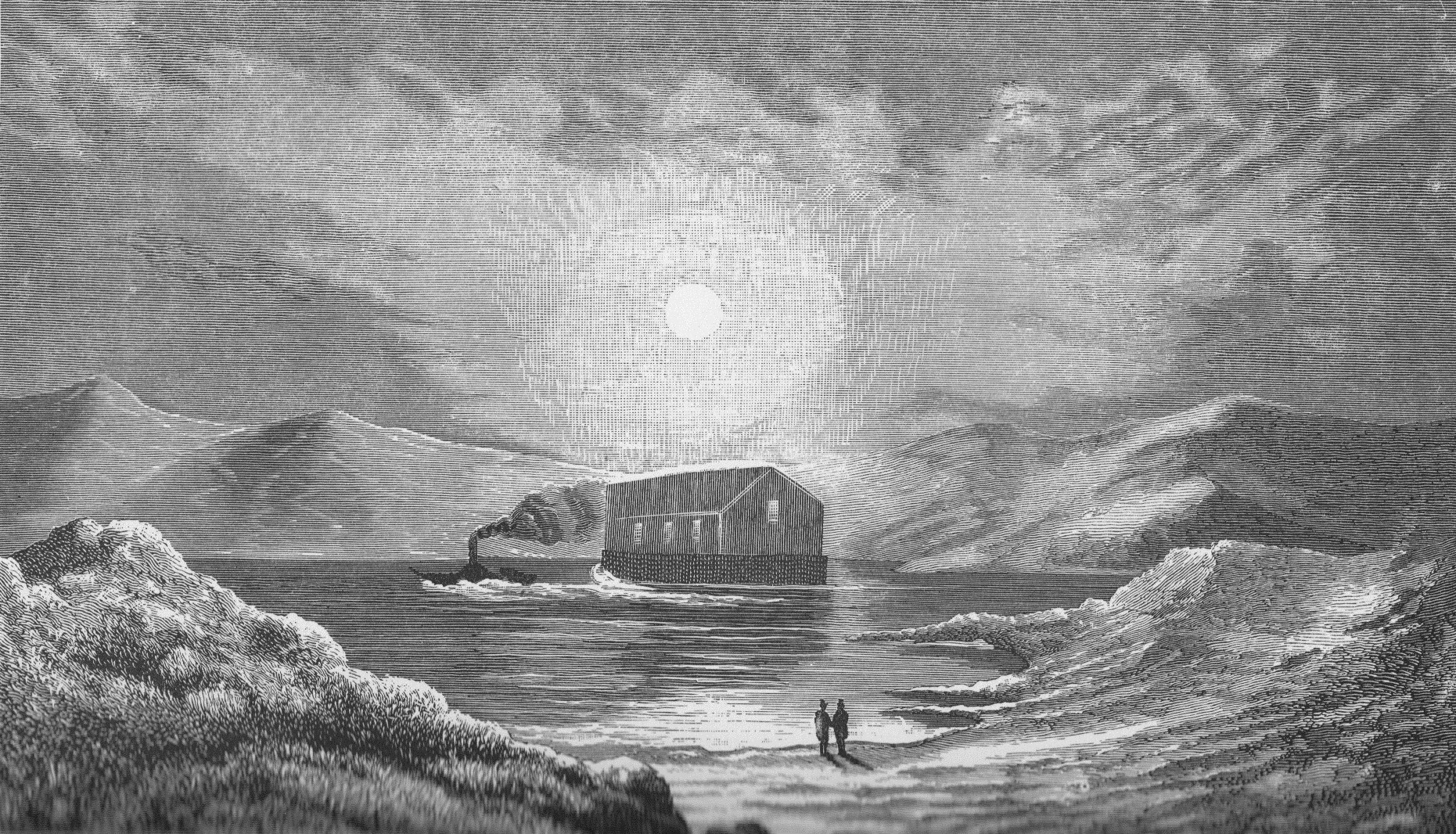
A floating iron church in the Scottish Highlands (1840s)

The Industrial Revolution was a time of great population expansion and movement in Europe. Towns and cities expanded as the workforce moved into the new industrial areas, resulting in the building of more than 4,000 churches during the mid-19th century, and an upsurge of nonconformism led to a demand for even more buildings. The Church of England, influenced by Pugin, the Cambridge Camden Society and John Ruskin, was initially sceptical about corrugated-iron buildings. However, manufacturers found other markets, notably in the colonies of the British Empire where 19 such churches were erected in Melbourne, Australia, alone by 1851. A 65-by-40-foot (20 by 12 m) church built entirely of cast and wrought iron clad in corrugated iron was built in Jamaica at a cost of £1,000. William Morris, founder of the Arts and Crafts Movement, wrote a pamphlet in 1890 decrying the construction of corrugated-iron buildings "that were spreading like a pestilence over the country."

Opening of a New Iron Meeting-House.
On Thursday last the "United Free Church Primitive Methodists" opened a new iron building at the corner of Argyle Street and the Woodbridge Road. The building has an odd appearance, and as it is but a temporary structure, it has been not inaptly termed the "tin tabernacle". [...] The sides and roof are of corrugated iron, and present the appearance externally of a huge tin cannister."

— Ipswich Journal, 1874.

Churches, chapels and mission halls were built in new industrial areas, pit villages, near railway works and in more isolated rural and coastal locations. Landowners or employers frequently donated plots of land and sometimes donated the cost of the building, although many were funded by public subscription. The 3rd Marquess of Bute provided the first Roman Catholic cathedral to be erected in Oban in 1886. It was lavishly decorated and furnished and lasted for 50 years until it was replaced.

Early tin churches were easily erected, but at an average cost of between £2 and £4 per sitting, were expensive. St Mark's Church in Birkenhead, built in 1867, cost more than £2,000 for 500 seats. Prices decreased to almost £1 per sitting towards the end of the century. David Rowell & Co.'s 1901 catalogue advertised a church to seat 400 persons, delivered to the nearest railway station and erected on the purchaser's foundation, at a cost of £360. Isaac Dixon's 1896 catalogue mentioned that the company had supplied nearly 150 churches over the previous ten years and the price had dropped from 35 shillings to 20 shillings (£1.75 to £1) per sitting plus the cost of foundations, heating and lighting, which could add another £70 for a church to seat 200.

Several tin tabernacles survive as places of worship; some have listed building status and some have been converted to other uses. Some redundant chapels have been moved to museums for preservation. St Chad's Mission Church was moved from near Telford to the Ironbridge Gorge Museum Trust's Blists Hill Victorian Town in Shropshire, while St Saviour's Church from Westhouses in Derbyshire may be seen at the Midland Railway Centre's Swanwick Junction site. St Margaret's Church from South Wonston, near Winchester, Hampshire, is now at the Weald and Downland Open Air Museum in West Sussex.

== Manufacturers ==
Several firms, such as David Rowell & Co., Humphrey's and Frederick Braby in London, Isaac Dixon and Co and Francis Morton in Liverpool, E T Bellhouse in Manchester and A & J Main & Co of Glasgow, manufactured a range of iron buildings that included houses, village halls, sports pavilions, warehouses, hospital wards, chapels and churches. Many of their products were exported to Canada, Africa, and to California and Australia during the gold rushes. Other manufacturers of corrugated-iron churches in Glasgow included Braby & Company and R. R. Speirs who supplied 75 churches between 1908 and 1914. Corrugated-iron buildings were exhibited at the Great Exhibition in 1851. Isaac Dixon's 1874 catalogue was aimed at the landed gentry, railway proprietors and shippers, while Francis Morton's company had a dedicated church building department and its 1879 catalogue reported nearly 70 churches, chapels and school houses built in the United Kingdom.

== Churches and chapels ==
Symbol	Key
(*)	This tin tabernacle has been demolished.

=== England ===
Name	Location	Photograph	Denomination	Notes	Listing grade
Addiscombe Baptist Church	Addiscombe, London; 51.3839°N 0.0775°W		Baptist	A site for the church was bought for £550 and a 264-capacity tin tabernacle was erected in December 1901.	
Ashington Mission Church	Ashington, Wimborne 50.78102°N 2.00226°W	The Old Church, Ashington - geograph.org.uk - 2770467	Anglican	The Ashington Mission Church was built in 1900 on land leased from the Canford Estate. After years of disuse, it was converted into a three-bedroom house.	
St John's Church	Adlington, Cheshire; 53.3195°N 2.1137°W		Anglican	St John's Church was built in 1892 and continues in active use as an Anglican mission church to St Peter's Church, Prestbury.	
Mission Church	Alhampton, Somerset; 51.1098°N 2.5327°W		Anglican	The church was built in 1892 at a cost of £250; it seats 55 people. It continues in active use as a mission church to St Mary Magdalene, Ditcheat.	
Areley Kings Methodist Church	Areley Kings, Worcestershire; 52.3251°N 2.2924°W		Methodist	Located at Astley Cross in the village of Areley Kings, and registered for worship in November 1905 with the name Wesleyan Mission Hall, this tin tabernacle was built in 1905 and remains in use as a Methodist church with one service each Sunday. It is in the Kidderminster and Stourport Circuit.	
Free Church Mission Hall	Ashtead, Surrey; 51.3135°N 0.3102°W		None (formerly Baptist)	Ashtead's first Baptist church was opened in 1895 and appears in that year's Ordnance Survey map as a mission hall. A new church superseded it in 1924, but the building survives and is used by the Epsom and Ewell Conservative Association.	
St Felix Chapel	Babingley, Norfolk; 52.8089°N 0.4839°E		British Orthodox Church (formerly Anglican)	St Felix Chapel is a thatched, cruciform tin tabernacle. It was erected in 1880 and was at one time an Anglican parish church. It was made redundant by the Church of England and is used by the British Orthodox Church.	
Catholic church of St Vincent de Paul	Barnwell, Cambridge, Cambridgeshire; 52.215°N 0.168°E		Roman Catholic	Originally part of the First Eastern General Hospital, Cambridge. After World War I it was moved to the rectory garden of the church of Our Lady and the English Martyrs and named Houghton Hall. In 1939 it became St Laurence's Church, Chesterton. Following the opening of the new St Laurence's Church in 1958, the tin tabernacle was moved to its present site and became the Church of St Vincent de Paul.	
Bartley Tin Church	Bartley, Hampshire; 50.90909°N 1.55435°W		None (formerly Anglican)	The church was built in 1900 and continued in use as an Anglican church until 1992. In 1998 it was sold by the Diocese of Winchester to the local community, who have developed it into a village hall.	
Oldfield Park Methodist Church (*)	Bath, Somerset		(formerly Methodist)	Built in about 1892, Oldfield Park Methodist Church closed in 2009.	
Former Bailbrook Mission Church	Bath, Somerset			Opened 4 July 1892. Elaborate example and most expensive design from a catalogue by William Cooper, Old Kent Road. Applications for residential conversion being prepared by new owners. Grade II listed by Historic England on 25 August 1992.	Grade II
Church of the Ascension	Bedmond, Hertfordshire; 51.7230°N 0.4108°W		Anglican	The Church of the Ascension was built in 1880 at a cost of £80. A copper-coated steeple was added in 2005. It continues as an active church in the parish of St Lawrence, Abbots Langley, and has Grade II listed status.	Grade II
St Peter's Church	Beech, Hampshire; 51.144258°N 1.011909°W		Anglican	St Peter's is part of the four-church Anglican Parish of the Resurrection serving Alton, Beech and Holybourne. Cdr du Santoy Anstis donated the land and erected the tin tabernacle in 1902. Its bell came from a ship he commanded.	
Christ Church (Blackgang Mission)	Blackgang, Isle of Wight; 50.5948°N 1.3168°W		None (formerly Baptist)	The chapel opened in 1895 in the hamlet of Blackgang within Chale parish and was registered for marriages in July 1900, replacing an earlier mission hall. In 1912 it was described as undenominational. It is now used as a holiday cottage.	
St Barnabas' Church	Blackwater, Isle of Wight; 50.67505°N 1.2835°W		None (formerly Anglican)	St Barnabas' Church is now used by a retail business. It was erected in the late 19th century as a chapel of ease in the parish of St George's Church, Arreton, but became redundant in the late 20th century.	
Blennerhasset Evangelical Mission	Blennerhasset, Cumbria; 54.761222°N 3.279884°W		Evangelical	In 2007 weekly services were held on Sundays and prayer meetings and bible study on Wednesdays. Today the church has a weekly meeting at 6.15 every Sunday, though in October 2025 a notice saying 10:45 was on display.	
St Matthew's Church (*)	Boultham, Lincoln; 53.2206°N 0.5532°W		None (formerly Anglican)	St Matthew's was created as a chapel of ease to St Helen's, Boultham, in 1912, to serve workers in local factories. It was extended in 1924 but was later closed, damaged by fire and has since been demolished.	
Shaftesbury Hall	Bowes Park, London; 51.6071°N 0.1210°W		None (formerly Baptist)	The hall was built in 1885 as a chapel for railway workers next to Bowes Park railway station. It also became the nucleus of Bounds Green Board School, with lessons held there in the 1880s. As of 2011 the hall, in Herbert Road, is owned by the Samaritans. Plans have been submitted for the development of the site, but are opposed by local residents.	
Church in the Woods	Bramdean Common, Hampshire; 51.058926°N 1.099818°W		Anglican	This tin tabernacle was erected in the middle of a wood at Bramdean Common. It was built in 1883 at the expense of Rev. A.C. Bishop of Bramdean for "the commoners, charcoal burners and itinerant gypsies who seasonally occupied Bramdean Common". Services are held twice a month in the summer.	
All Saints' Church	Brokerswood, Wiltshire; 51.2685°N 2.2348°W		Anglican	All Saints' Church was originally built in Southwick to replace an iron church that had been destroyed by fire in 1897. In 1905 it was moved to Brokerswood. It was restored in the 1990s and remains in active use. The church was listed at Grade II in January 2014.	Grade II
St Mary's Church	Burgh Parva, Melton Constable, Norfolk; 52.8607°N 1.0340°E		Anglican	St Mary's was built in 1903 in the churchyard of an abandoned medieval church to serve as the parish church of Melton Constable. It continues in active use, its benefice being united with those of three other local churches.	
Former Railway Mission	Bury St Edmunds, Suffolk; 52.2539°N 0.7138°W		Seventh-Day Adventist (formerly Anglican)	A Railway Mission by Bury St Edmunds railway station was opened for railway workers who raised money to build it in 1900. The chapel was supplied by Boulton and Paul from Norwich with furniture and fittings costing £317 7s 7d. It is now used as a Seventh-day Adventist Church.	
St Mary's Church	Cadgwith, Cornwall; 49.9877°N 5.1806°W		Anglican	St Mary's Church is on a footpath in the valley between the car park and the village centre. It was built in 1898 as a mission church for the village fishermen. It is a chapel of ease to St Rumon, the parish church of Ruan Minor, and a service is held monthly. Largely unaltered, it was Grade II-listed in February 2024.	Grade II
Castle End Mission and Working Mens Institute and attached Iron Hall	Cambridge, Cambridgeshire		Cambridge Chinese Christian Church	Iron Hall was present in 1886 and may have been present prior to the construction of the Castle End Mission and Working Mens Institute in 1884. The Mission closed in 2014. It was listed at Grade II by Historic England on 8 April 2026.	Grade II
Old St Columba's Church (*)	Catisfield, Fareham, Hampshire; 50.8532°N 1.2240°W		(formerly Anglican)	The original St Columba's Church was built in 1891 as a mission church to Holy Trinity, Fareham. It continued in active use until 1993 when it became redundant. It was then used as a youth club before being demolished in the 1990s. The photograph shows the building in 1991.	
St Aidan's Church	Caythorpe, Nottinghamshire; 53.0040°N 0.9789°W		Anglican	St Aidan's Church opened in 1900 as a chapel of ease to St Mary's Church, Lowdham, four miles distant. It remains in active use as part of Lowdham parish. It may have been built by C. Kent, who was responsible for putting up several tin tabernacles in this part of Nottinghamshire. The church cost £250 (the land was given free by a local family) and was opened and dedicated on 8 March 1900 by George Ridding, Bishop of Southwell. Considerable structural work was undertaken in 1992. It was Grade II-listed in July 2022.	Grade II
Sealand Road URC	Chester, Cheshire; 53.1944°N 2.9004°W		(formerly United Reformed Church)	The church was built in 1909 and closed for worship in May 2011. It has been converted for use as a holiday cottage.	
St Saviour's Church	Chiddingstone Causeway, Kent; 51.1986°N 0.1715°E		None (formerly Anglican)	This was built in about 1875 to serve the village. When a large stone-built church, St Luke's, was erected next to it, the building became surplus to requirements and was moved further along the road to serve as the village hall—a function it has had since about 1902.	
Chilworth Mission Church	Chilworth, Surrey; 51.2135°N 0.5374°W		None (formerly Anglican)	This tin tabernacle was erected in the centre of Chilworth in 1896. It was linked with the parish church of Shalford, although it was in the parish of St Martha's. When St Thomas's Church opened the iron building became the village hall.	
Clara Vale Methodist Church	Clara Vale, Tyne and Wear; 54.97815°N 1.7923°W		Methodist	A tin church next to a stone built Wesleyan church inscribed 1908. The tin church is now holiday accommodation with a notice saying the congregation outgrew it and built the bigger building. Latterly the tin building was the Methodist Sunday School.	
St Hugh's	Cockernhoe, Hertfordshire; 51.898958°N 0.3644°W		Anglican	St Hugh's, in the parish of St Francis, Luton, with St Hugh, Cockernhoe, was erected as a temporary structure in 1904. One side has been replaced and pews from St Francis installed. The church hosts a carol service, a service on Easter Sunday and the local primary school use it for a monthly service.	
St Andrew's Mission Church	Crabtree, Burscough, Lancashire; 53.6044°N 2.8650°W		Anglican	St Andrew's Mission Church continues in active use as a mission church in the parish of Burscough.	
St John's Church (*)	Croydon, London		Anglican	The medieval Church of St John in Croydon was gutted by fire in January 1867. Plans were put in place to rebuild it, but as a temporary measure an unidentified London clergyman lent the parish an iron church, which was erected on a site near the public baths in Scarbrook Road. It opened for services on Good Friday (19 April) 1867, with seating for up to 1,000; and closed and was dismantled when the new church was consecrated in January 1870.	
St Barbara's Church	Deepcut Barracks, Surrey; 51.3062°N 0.7048°W		Anglican	St Barbara's Church was built at the barracks in 1901 dedicated to St Michael and All Angels. It is now dedicated to St Barbara and remains in use by the barracks and local community. A Grade II listed building, it is "a good and relatively ambitious example" of a tin tabernacle, possibly a Humphrey's of Croydon design. There are several stained-glass windows of various dates. The church exterior features in the 2015 film Kingsman: The Secret Service representing a church in Kentucky, USA.	Grade II
St Saviour's Church	Dottery, Dorset; 50.7535°N 2.7693°W		Anglican	St Saviour's Church was built in 1881–82 and continues to serve the small hamlet of Dottery.	
Edge End Methodist Church	Edge End, Gloucestershire; 51.816754°N 2.590388°W		Methodist	Located in a hamlet in the Forest of Dean, Edge End Methodist Church is a tin tabernacle in its natural habitat.	
Edithmead Mission Church	Edithmead, Somerset; 51.2390°N 2.9637°W		Anglican	The church was constructed in East Brent as an adult school around 1896, and moved to Edithmead in Burnham Without in 1919. It was Grade II-listed in 2024.	Grade II
Glyn Hall	Ewell, Surrey; 51.3491°N 0.2485°W		None (formerly Open Brethren)	This was originally registered for use by Open Brethren until their permanent building, Staneway Chapel, was opened in 1955. Today it is a community venue used by a variety of groups and individuals without any religious connection.	
St Saviour's Church	Faversham, Kent; 51.3143°N 0.8973°E		None (formerly Anglican)	St Saviour's Church was built in 1885 as a mission church for the parish church. It has a cruciform plan, bellcote and spire and was elaborately decorated. It is a Grade II listed building. It is now in use as a private dwelling.	Grade II
Main Street Community Church	Frodsham, Cheshire; 53.2947°N 2.7291°W		Evangelical (formerly Anglican)	St Dunstan's Church cost £600 and opened with 230 seats in 1872 as a chapel of ease to the parish church. It was licensed as the parish church for two years from 1880 while St Laurence's Church was refurbished and retained as a mission church after that. After some years of disuse the building was taken over by the present evangelical congregation in the 1980s. The structure was moved on rollers ten feet to the left and refurbished in 1995 and acquired its current name in 2007.	
Golden Green Mission Church	Golden Green, Kent; 51.2100°N 0.3431°E		Anglican	This green-painted building has a chancel and nave under a single-pitched roof. It was erected in about 1914 to serve a tiny hamlet near Hadlow in the Kentish Weald. An extension was added later in complementary style. The chapel was listed at Grade II in 1990.	Grade II
St Francis's Church	Gosport, Hampshire; 50.7826°N 1.1339°W		Anglican	St Francis's Church is one of three within the parish of St Mary, Alverstoke. It serves the Clayhall area in the south-east of Gosport. Erected in 1905 to house the church institute, it was converted into a church in 1960–61.	
Urswick United Reformed Church	Great Urswick, Cumbria; 54.1625°N 3.1193°W		United Reformed Church (formerly Church of Christ)	The plot of land was purchased in 1914 and the church was built on 22 April 1915. The total cost was £13.19s.4d. A full body immersion font remains under the Communion table platform; it was still used regularly until about 1970. Appeared derelict in September 2025	
Seventh Day Baptist Church	Greet, Birmingham; 52.4548°N 1.8573°W		Baptist	The Seventh Day Baptist Church is in active use.	
Gate House Baptist Chapel	Hadlow Down, East Sussex; 51.0013°N 0.1747°E		Baptist	Henry Donkin moved to the village in 1885 and founded this mission room ("the Tin Heaven") on his land soon afterwards. It was moved nearer the village centre in 1907 and was registered for marriages in 1918. It became a full-time chapel in 1922 but closed after incumbent pastor's death in 1940, after which the building became a canteen then commercial premises.	
Evangelical Church	Haggerston, Hackney, London; 51.5389°N 0.0650°W		Evangelical (formerly Presbyterian)	Haggerston's iron church was built in 1868. Originally clad in corrugated iron, it has been re-clad in asbestos sheeting. It is described as "An early, rare and complete example of a temporary iron Mission Church", and is listed at Grade II.	Grade II
Halse Mission Church	Halse, Northamptonshire; 52.0586°N 1.1751°W		Anglican	Built in the late 19th century as a community room for railway workers, Halse Mission Church was bought by the Earl of Ellesmere and moved to its present site. It opened for worship in 1900 and continues in use as a mission church in the parish of St Peter with St James, Brackley.	
St Philip's Church	Hassall Green, Cheshire; 53.1208°N 2.3336°W		Anglican	St Philip's Church originated in 1883 as St Mary's Church, Alsager, and was moved to its present site at Hassall Green in 1895. It continues in use as an Anglican church in the benefice of Sandbach Heath with Wheelock.	
Hazeleigh Church (*)	Hazeleigh, Essex		(formerly Anglican)	The iron church was erected in the late 19th century by the rector, the Rev William Stuart, M.A., because the original parish church had become dilapidated and was far from the centre of the village. Both churches were demolished in the 20th century and Hazeleigh now forms part of the parish of Woodham Mortimer.	
Heathrow Chapel (*)	Heathrow, Middlesex		(formerly Baptist)	A tin mission hall was built by Sipson Baptist Church on the east side of Cain's Lane in 1901 to serve the hamlet's rural population. The chapel was demolished in 1944 when Heathrow Airport was constructed.	
Henton Mission Room	Chiltern Open Air Museum, Chalfont St Giles, Buckinghamshire			Erected in 1886 on land in the hamlet of Henton leased to the Rector and Church wardens of Chinnor, Oxfordshire, by Magdalen College, Oxford. The college granted the land with the specific purpose of erecting a mission room. Supplied by Boulton and Paul of Norwich. The Tin Chapel served as a place of worship until 1973. Acquired by the Chiltern Open Air Museum after two decades of disuse. Dismantling began in October 1993 and it was reconstructed at the museum between 1994 and 1997.	
Pentecostal Mission Hall	Hermitage, Southbourne, West Sussex; 50.8436°N 0.9275°W		Pentecostal	This abandoned tin tabernacle is on the road leading to Thorney Island. It was used by a group of Pentecostal worshippers who originally met at a house on the same road. The building was acquired second-hand from Selsey, where it was in secular use, taken apart and transported to Hermitage, where it was rebuilt on a site where a footpath leaves Thorney Road.	
St Peter's Church	High Salvington, West Sussex; 50.8485°N 0.4081°W		Anglican	The vicar of St Symphorian's Church at Durrington paid for this tin tabernacle to be erected in High Salvington in 1928. It was part of that church's parish between 1951 and 2010—since when it has been linked to All Saints Church at Findon Valley—and is Worthing's only iron church.	
Good Shepherd Mission	Hurlston Green, Scarisbrick, Lancashire; 53.5968°N 2.9090°W		Anglican	The Good Shepherd Mission was built in 1907, having been delivered via the Leeds and Liverpool Canal. It continues to be an active mission church in the parish of St Mark, Scarisbrick. As of October 2025 it appears disused and is marked as private land.	
St Michael and All Angels' Church	Hythe, Kent; 51.0698°N 1.0822°E		Anglican	St Michael and All Angels' Church is a Grade II listed building built in 1893. It is a pre-fabricated structure supplied by Humphrey's of Croydon. Its exterior walls and roof are made of corrugated iron on a steel frame. The interior is boarded throughout and the church has wooden window frames.	Grade II
St Barnabas' Church	Kenilworth, Warwickshire; 52.3500°N 1.5716°W		Anglican	This church was built in 1886 as a chapel of ease within the parish of St Nicholas Church, Kenilworth, and remains in use as part of that parish.	
Kilburn tin tabernacle / Cambridge Hall	Kilburn, London; 51.5362°N 0.1923°W		None (formerly Congregational)	This was built by James Bailey in 1863, and used for worship until the 1920s, when it was used by sea cadets. In 2010 there was a campaign to repair and restore it. It is a Grade II listed building.	Grade II
Knowle Mission Room	Knowle, Shropshire; 52.3632°N 2.5925°W		Anglican	This is an Anglican mission hall within the Tenbury Team Ministry.	
St Stephen-on-the-Downs Church (*)	Langley Vale, Epsom, Surrey		(formerly Anglican)	This outlying part of the parish of St Martin's Church, Epsom, was provided with a tin tabernacle dedicated to St Stephen in 1919. A new church with the same dedication was built next to in the early 1960s and was consecrated on 17 December 1961, and the tin tabernacle was demolished.	
Community of Christ (known locally as the "Little Blue Church" and sometimes as the "Iron Church"), Leicester	Leicester; 52.6596°N 1.1333°W		Originally Anglican. Now Community of Christ (formerly called Reorganized Church of Jesus Christ of Latter Day Saints, (RLDS))	Originally a Mission Church associated with St Peter's Parish Church, Belgrave. Following a period of secular use, the building has been used since 1977 by the RLDS (now called Community of Christ), a community that has had a Leicester congregation since 1891. Location: 330 Abbey Lane, Leicester LE4 2AB	
Linwood Methodist Chapel	Linwood, Lincolnshire; 53.364096°N 0.334163°W		None (formerly Methodist)	Linwood Methodist Chapel may have been moved from Holton cum Beckering or it may have been the temporary church erected in Walesby in 1881 and moved in 1914 after St Mary's Church was built. It is currently disused.	
Mission Hall	Liss, Hampshire; 51.043127°N 0.890176°W		Plymouth Brethren	This was briefly in religious use for a Brethren assembly: the planning application raised in 2011 for its conversion into a house stated that it dated from c. 1922, and A List of Some Assemblies of the British Isles (1933), a directory of Brethren assemblies, identifies a "Central Gospel Hall" in Liss.	
St Saviour's Church (*)	Liss Forest, Hampshire; 51.0542°N 0.8852°W		(formerly Anglican)	This Anglican church was in the joint parish of Liss and Liss Forest. It closed in 2012, and planning permission was granted for its demolition and replacement with houses.	
St Peter's Church	Littlebury Green, Essex; 52.02477°N 0.17051°E		Anglican	Built in 1885 as a chapel of ease for Holy Trinity Church in Littlebury. It was Grade II listed in November 2025.	Grade II
St Mary's Church	Long Eaton, Derbyshire; 52.8874°N 1.2873°W		Anglican	This tin tabernacle originally stood in Heanor, also in Derbyshire, but was moved to its present location in the New Sawley area of Long Eaton in 1912. It remains in use as a chapel of ease in the parish of All Saints' Church, Sawley and is the only tin tabernacle still in use as a church in the Diocese of Derby.	
St Peter's Church	Lower Withington, Cheshire; 53.2285°N 2.2915°W		Anglican	St Peter's Church was built in 1891 as a chapel of ease to St John, Chelford. The benefice of the churches has been united. It is still in active use.	
Ludgershall Mission Hall	Ludgershall, Wiltshire51.2546°N 1.6156°W		Evangelical	This tin tabernacle was registered for worship by the Ludgershall Evangelical Mission in 1921, then for marriages the following July.	
St John the Baptist Church	Maesbury, Shropshire; 52.8236°N 3.0250°W		Anglican	St John the Baptist Church is an active church in the village of Maesbury.. Bought from Harrods and built by local labour.	
St Mary's Church	Moorcourt Kington, Herefordshire		Anglican	Built for Reverend James Davies of Moorcourt as a chapel of ease to replace a room at Boxford that had been used for worship by the outlying communities in the Parish of Pembridge. Davies commissioned Hemming and Co. of 23 Moorgate Street, London, to construct the prefabricated chapel. It was to be a variation on Hemming's advertised 'Iron Church' design with nave, chancel and porch. The church was opened on Easter Monday 1860. It is still active use and was listed at Grade II by Historic England on 25 August 2020.	Grade II
St Mary's Church	Newton-by-the-Sea, Northumberland; 55.5172°N 1.6225°W		Anglican	St Mary's Church was built as a mission room in the later part of the 19th century, and continues in active use as a church and a meeting room in the parish of Embleton.	
Newton Heath Evangelical Church	Newton Heath, Manchester; 53.4991°N 2.1769°W		Evangelical	A member of the Fellowship of Independent Evangelical Churches. The church was established in 1901.	
New Bradwell Gospel Hall	New Bradwell, Milton Keynes; 52.0643°N 0.7985°W		None (formerly Open Brethren)	Currently closed and for sale. In the past, New Bradwell Gospel Hall was linked with the Open Brethren and was involved with the Evangelical Chapel in Stony Stratford, part of the orphanage run by J. W. C. Fegan, in the formation in 1917 of Emmanuel Chapel in Wolverton, now Wolverton Evangelical Church. The building was registered for worship as "The Iron Room" in August 1891 and for marriages the following month; at this time its location was described as Stantonbury.	
Congregational Chapel	Old Heath, Colchester, Essex; 51.8684°N 0.9282°E		Congregational	The Congregational Chapel was built in 1869 as an outreach mission for Lion Walk Congregational Church. It was enlarged in 1888, and 1898. It continues in use as a Congregational chapel. The building, which had been unused since the early 2010s, burned down on 20 May 2025.	
Sandown Mission Hall	Ore, Hastings, East Sussex; 50.8707°N 0.6038°E		Anglican	The mission, now in secular use, stood at the corner of School Road and Sandown Road in Ore. It was built in late 1894 and formally opened on 5 December 1894 by Sir James Colquhoun, 5th Baronet. Initially run by a Mrs Holt, from 27 September 1902 it was taken over and run by nearby Christ Church. By 1952 part of the building was in use as an overflow classroom for a nearby primary school.	
St Michael's Church	Peasmarsh, Surrey; 51.2087°N 0.5815°W		Anglican	Occasional services are held in this tin tabernacle in the hamlet of Peasmarsh, part of Shalford parish.	
Christchurch	Pointon, Bourne, Lincolnshire; 52.8728°N 0.3462°W		Anglican	Christchurch in Pinfold Lane is an Anglican mission church, erected in 1893 to support the work of St Andrew's Parish Church at Sempringham. It continues in use as an active church and, as the parish church lacks electricity, Christchurch is the focus during the darker days of the year.	
Heath Church	Reigate, Surrey; 51.2380°N 0.2242°W		Anglican	The first service at Heath Church was held in 1907, and the church continues in use in the parish of St Mary Magdalene, Reigate.	
St John's Church	Rookley, Isle of Wight; 50.6562°N 1.2841°W		None (formerly Anglican)	Like St Barnabas' Church in nearby Blackwater, this tin tabernacle dates from the late 19th century and was a chapel of ease to St George's Church, Arreton. After closing it became a builder's yard.	
St Gabriel's Church	Rough Common, Kent; 51.2930°N 1.0486°E		Anglican	This was built in 1890 as an Anglican mission room in the parish of Harbledown. It was renamed in the 1940s and gained the status of a full church. The wood-panelled interior features a stained-glass window retrieved from a former church in Ramsgate which was damaged by World War II bombing. Two services are held monthly.	
Cuxton Chapel, Kent Life	Sandling, Kent; 51.2976°N 0.5049°E		None (formerly Anglican)	Originally a chapel in the village of Cuxton, Kent, Cuxton Chapel was moved to the Kent Life museum in 2000.	
St Mary the Virgin's Church	Shepperdine, South Gloucestershire; 51.6637°N 2.5548°W		Anglican	This tin tabernacle was listed at Grade II in July 2016. It was erected on land near a farm in the Severnside hamlet of Shepperdine in spring 1914, but originally stood elsewhere (possibly in Wales). The timber interior retains its original features. The church has been part of the parish of Oldbury-on-Severn since 1956, and has services at least once per month.	Grade II
St Mary's Church Room	Sole Street, Cobham, Kent; 51.3836°N 0.3794°E		Anglican	St Mary's Church Room continues in use as part of the parish of St Mary Magdalene, Cobham.	
Great Moulton Chapel, Museum of East Anglian Life	Stowmarket, Suffolk; 52.1829°N 0.9928°E		None (formerly Non-denominational)	Great Moulton Chapel was a non-denominational chapel with ties with other chapels, including Surrey Chapel. It was built in the 1890s by the Norwich firm of Boulton and Paul at a cost of £105 18s 0d. The chapel closed in 1990 and was moved the 30 miles (48 km) from Great Moulton to the Museum of East Anglian Life.	
St Paul's Church	Strines, Marple, Greater Manchester; 53.3747°N 2.0432°W		Anglican	St Paul's is 1.5 miles (2.4 km) south-east of Marple, Greater Manchester, in the parish of All Saints, Marple. It was built in 1880 by the owners of Strines (Calico) Print Works. The church continues in active use, and in November 2011 was designated by English Heritage as a Grade II listed building.	Grade II
St Saviour's Church, Midland Railway Centre	Swanwick Junction, Derbyshire; 53.0617°N 1.3829°W		None (formerly Anglican)	St Saviour's Church, originally at Westhouses, Nottinghamshire, was dismantled and rebuilt at Swanwick Junction by the Midland Railway Trust. The church was consecrated in 1898, became redundant in the 1990s and was acquired for the museum site.	
Thorlby Chapel	Thorlby, North Yorkshire; 53.9716°N 2.0527°W		None (formerly Methodist)	Original built as a Wesleyan Methodist chapel, now abandoned.	
All Saints' Church (*)	Thrupp, Gloucestershire; 51.7267°N 2.2015°W		(formerly Anglican)	The church was established in 1889, dedicated to All Saints and part of the parish of Holy Trinity, Stroud. It closed in 1968, some of its fittings were moved to Holy Trinity, and there were plans for it to be dismantled and stored. The photograph shows the building in 2002.	
St Andrew's Church	Tonbridge, Kent; 51.2086°N 0.3049°E		Anglican	Previously known as Hadlow Stair Mission, Fish Hall Mission and Fish Hall Church, this grew out of an Anglican mission held at Fish Hall, a mansion in north Tonbridge. A disused tin tabernacle was purchased in Brighton, transported to Tonbridge and re-erected on a plot of land gifted by A. E. Peters of Fish Hall.	
St Antony of Padua Roman Catholic Church	Trafford Park Village, Greater Manchester; 53.4665°N 2.3110°W		None (formerly Roman Catholic)	Three tin tabernacles were built in Trafford Park Village: a Methodist chapel in 1901, the Anglican St Cuthbert's Church in 1902, and the Roman Catholic St Antony of Padua in 1904. Much of the village was demolished by the early 1980s leaving the church with no resident population. Its parish of St Antony of Padua became an industrial chaplaincy. The church closed in 2009 but the building was retained for use by the Centre for Church and Industry.	
Twitton Mission Church	Twitton, Otford, Kent; 51.3135°N 0.1678°E		Anglican	This village west of Otford was served by an iron mission room from 1900 until 1982. It was extended in 1950 and rededicated as the Church of the Good Shepherd.	
St James's Church (*)	Vines Cross, East Sussex; 50.9378°N 0.2665°E		(formerly Anglican)	Originally used for storage, this building was converted into an Anglican chapel of ease in 1911 and was served from the church at Horam. A freestanding timber bell-tower supported a single bell. The church closed in 2004 when it became uneconomic to repair and was demolished in favour of housing.	
St Paul's Mission Church	Warren Row, Berkshire; 51.5194°N 0.8309°W		Anglican	St Paul's Mission Church was bought as a kit in 1894 for just over £100. It continues in active use as a mission church in the parish of Wargrave.	
West End Free Church	West End, Hampshire; 50.9238°N 1.3352°W		Baptist	West End Evangelical Mission Hall was erected in 1884 or 1885 in the garden of its founder, John St Barbe Baker. The church joined the Baptist Union in the 1960s and was registered as a Baptist church in August 1968. It is now owned by West End Christian Fellowship, who maintain worship of an Evangelical character in the building.	
St George's Church	West End, Surrey; 51.3611°N 0.3819°W		Anglican	This chapel of ease to St George's Church in Esher existed by 1911. It remains in active use as part of the parish of Esher; one service is held every Sunday.	
Westergate Mission Hall	Westergate, West Sussex; 50.8425°N 0.6676°W		None (formerly Anglican)	Apparently built in about October 1905 as a mission room for the parish church at Aldingbourne, this building later had various social functions (such as a Scout hut) until planning permission was granted in 2007 for its conversion into a house.	
Church of St Francis	Westhope, Canon Pyon, Herefordshire; 52.1551°N 2.7850°W		Anglican	Church of St Francis continues in use as an Anglican mission church in the parish of St Lawrence, Canon Pyon.	
Winterslow Baptist Church	Winterslow, Wiltshire; 51.0876°N 1.6661°W		Baptist	Winterslow Baptist Church remains in active use as a Baptist church.	
Church Hall at Braemar Avenue Baptist Church	Wood Green, London; 51.600512°N 0.117562°W		Baptist (church hall)	The church hall was built some time in the period 1904–1914. It is in need of repair and apparently disused. The church is in use, and a Grade II listed building, and the church hall is listed by virtue of being within the curtilage of the listed building.	
St Mary's Church	Woodland, County Durham; 54.6334°N 1.8878°W		Anglican	St Mary's Church has been in use as an Anglican church, latterly in the parish of Lynesack, since it was built at a cost of £150 in 1905.	
Woodmancote Mission Church	Woodmancote, West Sussex; 50.8623°N 0.8999°W		Anglican	The hamlet of Woodmancote in Westbourne parish is served by this "modest chapelry"—a rare prefabricated green-painted tin tabernacle with an entrance porch. It was erected in 1892 and licensed in 1928.	
Yeading Christian Fellowship	Yeading, London; 53.7693°N 2.6983°W		Apostolic Church	This was registered by its present congregation, members of the Apostolic Church, in March 1954.	

=== Scotland ===
Name	Location	Photograph	Denomination	Notes
Dalswinton Mission or Barony Church	Dalswinton, Dumfries and Galloway; 55.148°N 3.66241°W		Church of Scotland	Dalswinton Mission was built in 1881 and stained-glass windows were added in 1950 and 1975. The walls and roof are clad with red-painted corrugated-iron sheets. It has Gothic windows, a bellcote and spire. The building remains in active use.
Tin Church, Isle of Seil	Ellenabeich, Seil, Argyll and Bute; 56.290°N 5.628°W		None (formerly Free Church of Scotland)	A tin church built in the early 1900s for the Free Church of Scotland on Seil was used until the 1950s. It fell into disrepair but was renovated for residential and business use.
Hallmuir Ukrainian Chapel	Hallmuir Camp, Dumfries and Galloway; 55.0995°N 3.3670°W		Ukrainian Orthodox Greek Catholic Church	This was converted from a temporary army building into a church to serve prisoners of war in 1942. The prisoners were Ukrainians belonging to the 14th Waffen Grenadier Division of the SS (1st Galician).
St Fillan's Church	Killin, Stirling; 56.4689°N 4.3168°W		Scottish Episcopal	Built in 1876 by the Marquess of Breadalbane for members of his shooting party, St Fillan's Church was extended in the early 20th century. It continues in active use in the Scottish Episcopal Church. It has been listed as Grade C(S).
Kinlochewe Church of Scotland	Kinlochewe, Highland 57.6039°N 5.2985°W		Church of Scotland	
Italian Chapel	Lamb Holm, Orkney; 58.8897°N 2.8901°W		Roman Catholic	The Italian Chapel on the uninhabited island of Lamb Holm is a tin chapel made from corrugated iron from two Nissen huts by Italian prisoners of war during World War II.
Limerigg Church (*)	Limerigg, Falkirk 55.9152°N 3.8309°W		Church of Scotland	Initially commissioned by Slamannan Parish Church in the early 1880s, this church finished construction in 1885. The church was wrecked by a gale in 1951 and then rebuilt (again out of corrugated iron) in 1953. The church was finally demolished in 2003 after it was discovered that the building was structurally unstable.
St James' Roman Catholic Church (*)	St. Andrews, Fife; 56.3353°N 2.8007°W		(formerly Roman Catholic)	Consecrated in 1884, this building is notable for being moved (in three sections) across town from the Scores to James St., on wagons towed by traction engine, in 1909–10, by John D. Spence, who transformed it into a venue for roller-skating and to house the town's first fixed-site cinema, La Scala. It was extended, then used as a warehouse, and finally demolished in 2003.
Syre Church	Syre, Strathnaver; 58.3639°N 4.2375°W		Church of Scotland	The corrugated-iron church at Syre was built by Frederick Braby & Company of Glasgow in 1891.

=== Wales ===
Name	Location	Photograph	Denomination	Notes
Good Shepherd	Drury, Flintshire; 53.172704°N 3.060247°W		Church in Wales	The Church of the Good Shepherd is a mission church for St Matthew's in Buckley. It is clad in steel sheets.
St Thomas's Church	Birchgrove, Cardiff; 51.5146°N 3.2054°W		Church in Wales	This was built in 1913 as a mission church within the parish of Whitchurch. The seating capacity as originally designed was 200.
St Peter's Church (*)	Goytre, Neath Port Talbot; 51.5924°N 3.7549°W		Church in Wales	Opened in 1915, closed in or before 2020.
St Andrew's Mission Church	Minera, Wrexham; 53.044186°N 3.076884°W		Church in Wales	The corrugated-iron church with a timber frame was built near Wern Farm for the Esclusham district in 1892. It had four windows with pointed Y-tracery, a small spire and a gabled porch at its west end and small vestry at its south-east corner. It was given Grade II listed status in 1998 because of its unaltered state.
St Anne's Church	New Hedges, Tenby, Pembrokeshire; 51.6892°N 4.7087°W		Church in Wales	St Anne's Church was built in 1928, and continues in active use in the Tenby Benefice.
Mission Hall	Pembroke; 51.6735°N 4.9057°W		Apostolic	Erected in 1913, in use in 2018
St Telio's Church	Pembroke Dock; 51.69355°N 4.92805°W		Church in Wales	Used as the church hall
St David's Church (*)	Pensarn, Abergele, Conwy; 53.2938°N 3.5797°W		(formerly Church in Wales)	St David's Church was built in 1880, its replacement opened in 2011. The church was built to meet the needs of English residents who had moved to the area. It was intended as a temporary building but was used for 130 years.
Methodist Chapel	Rhosnesni, Wrexham; 53.0560°N 2.9746°W		Methodist	The Methodist Chapel at Rhosnesni remains in active use.
Calvary Evangelical Church	Rhymney, Caerphilly; 51.7596°N 3.2828°W		Evangelical	Calvary Evangelical Church continues in use as an evangelical church.
Treorchy Gospel Hall	Treorchy, Rhondda Cynon Taf; 51.6574°N 3.5076°W		Gospel Hall	In the later vernacular style, with the entry in a long wall.
Bethel Presbyterian Church	Abenbury, Wrexham; 53.0407°N 2.9487°W		Presbyterianism	Privately owned, on private land within the Cefn Park estate. A picture taken in 2008 shows it in a poor state, and fenced off for safety reasons.

=== Ireland ===
Name	Location	Photograph	Denomination	Notes
St. Matthias' Church	Andersonstown, Belfast, Northern Ireland; 54.583667°N 5.98227°W		None (formerly Church of Ireland and Roman Catholic)	Dating from 1892, St Matthias was built for the local British military garrison and originally belonged to the Church of Ireland. It was manufactured by Harland & Wolff, and became a Roman Catholic church in 1970. It is now somewhat derelict.
St Peter's Church	Laragh, Castleblayney, County Monaghan, Republic of Ireland; 54.8833°N 6.7668°W		None (formerly Church of Ireland)	St Peter's Church was built in 1890 by mill operator James McKean and consecrated on 13 August 1891. It was deconsecrated in 1962. Built in a wooded glen for the Church of Ireland in the Swiss Gothic style, it has a three-stage spire. The church was restored by Laragh Heritage Group in 2014; the spire, main structure and the stained-glass windows were repaired. The building is now in regular use for small local events.
Lurganboy Chapel of Ease	Lurganboy, County Leitrim, Republic of Ireland 54.3132°N 8.2148°W		Church of Ireland	Built for the Church of Ireland as a chapel of ease for Manorhamilton Parish in 1862, it is still in use as a church, and also functions as a community space.
Church of Our Lady of the Visitation	Rearcross, County Tipperary, Republic of Ireland; 52.6866°N 8.2367°W		Roman Catholic (formerly Wesleyan)	Originally built in Northumbria for a Wesleyan congregation and moved to Rearcross in 1887. It is in use as a Catholic church and was renovated around the year 2000.
Rossnowlagh Church	Rossnowlagh, County Donegal, Republic of Ireland; 54.547912°N 8.203657°W		Presbyterian	Built in 1906 and renovated in 1990. It remains in use, with a weekly service during July and August.
Church of Our Lady of the Rosary and the Guardian Angels	Sallins, County Kildare, Republic of Ireland; 53.24849°N 6.66400°W		Roman Catholic	Erected in 1924. Still in regular use year-round.

=== New Zealand ===
Name	Location	Photograph	Denomination	Notes
Naseby Athenæum	Naseby, Otago; 45.0242°S 170.14595°E		None (formerly Union Church)	A corrugated-iron church erected in 1865. It now houses the township's public library.
Church of St Alban the Martyr	St Bathans, Otago; 44.87246°S 169.81125°E		Anglican (formerly non-denominational)	The prefabricated corrugated-iron church was sent to New Zealand in 1883 by absentee runholder Frederick Dalgety. It was initially an interdenominational church and was known as the 'Mission House' or the 'Dalgety Church'.
St Mary's Church	Tokomaru Bay, Gisborne District; 38.13115°S 178.3149°E		Anglican	St Mary's Church is the third Anglican church to stand at Tuatini marae, and was probably built by Duncan Stirling between 1883 and 1886. It is thought to be the earliest of a group of corrugated-iron churches built and used by Maori communities on the East Coast region of New Zealand.

=== Australia ===
Name	Location	Photograph	Denomination	Notes
Wesleyan Church	Darwin, Northern Territory, Australia; 12.44615°S 130.83595°E		None (formerly Wesleyan Methodist Church of Australia)	Originally built in Adelaide, South Australia. It was shipped to Darwin in 1897. It was restored and moved to the George Brown Darwin Botanic Gardens in 2001, where it is used as a café.
St Barnabas' Church	Oxley, New South Wales, Australia; 34.193146°S 144.102292°E		Anglican	Along with Booligal, part of the Hay Parish in the Diocese of Riverina.
St Alban's Church	Booligal, New South Wales, Australia; 33.867554°S 144.886035°E		Anglican	Along with Oxley, part of the Hay Parish in the Diocese of Riverina.
