= St Peter's Church, Littlebury Green =

Church of St Peter
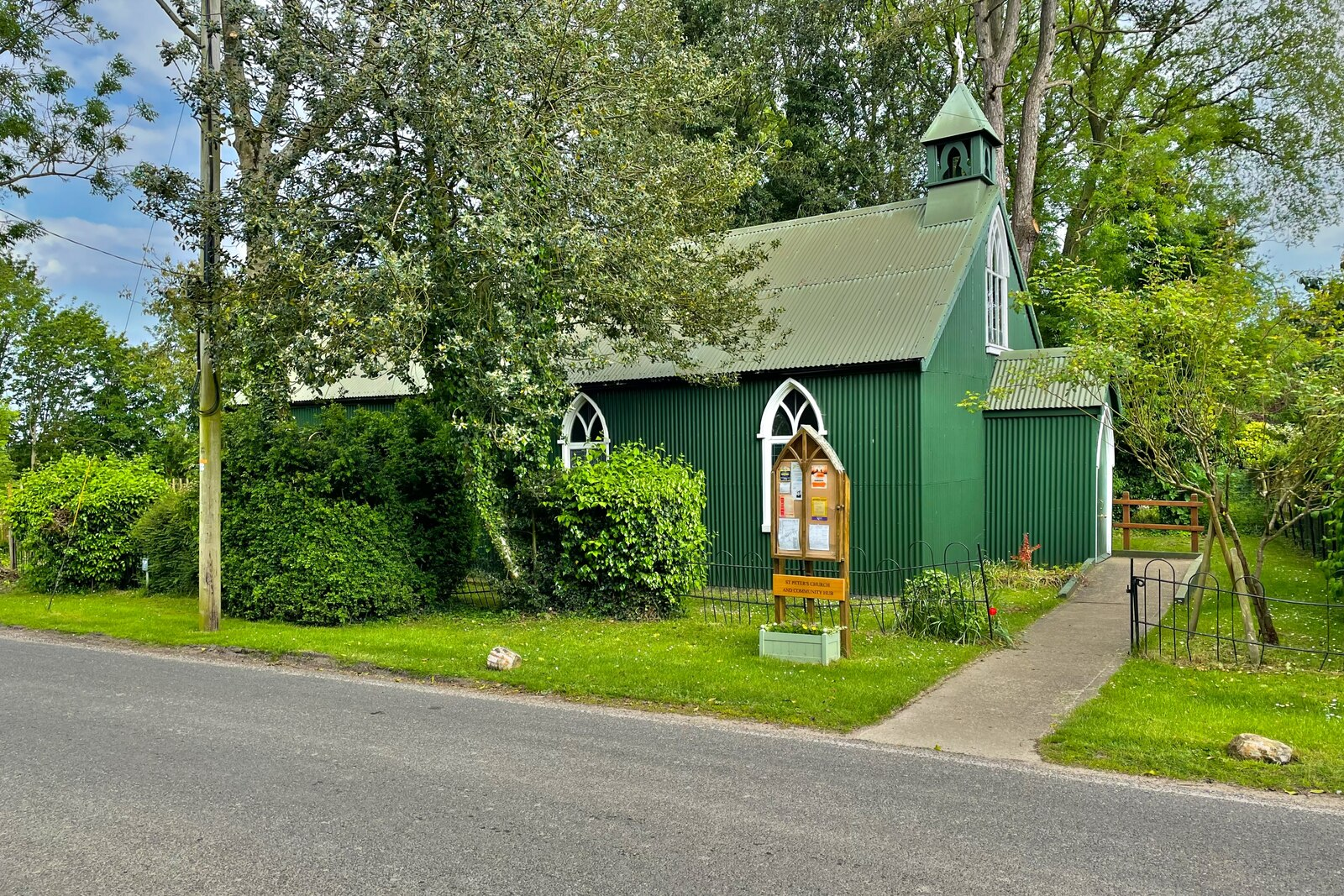
- Church of St Peter
- 52°01′29.18″N 0°10′13.84″E
- OS grid reference: TL 49021 38485
- Location: Littlebury Green, Essex
- Country: England
- Denomination: Church of England
- Website: www.camvillages.org.uk

Architecture
- Heritage designation: Grade II
- Designated: 4 November 2025
- Completed: 1885

Administration
- Diocese: Diocese of Chelmsford

St Peter's Church is an Anglican church in the village of Littlebury Green, near Saffron Walden in Essex, England. It is in the Diocese of Chelmsford and one of the Cam Village Churches.

It is a "tin tabernacle" dating from 1885, and retains most of the features of the original building. It was given Grade II listed status in November 2025; it was described by Historic England as a "rare Victorian gem of corrugated iron, faith and rural ingenuity".

== History and description ==
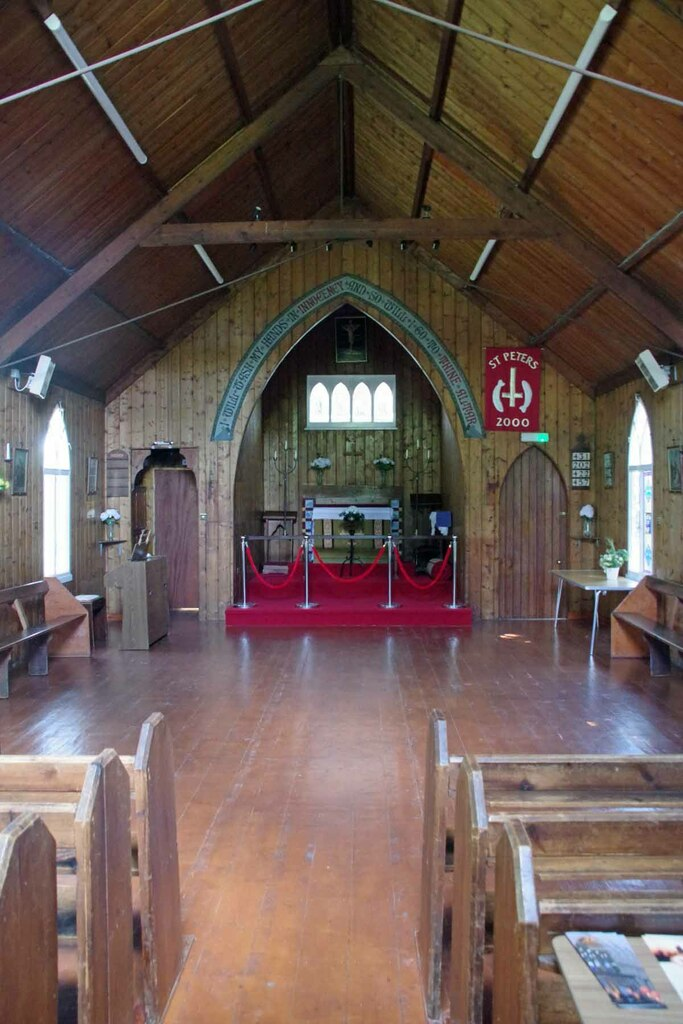
Interior, looking towards the chancel

The church was a project initiated by Rev. Cyril Wix, curate of Holy Trinity Church in Littlebury, to provide a chapel of ease for Holy Trinity Church, about 2 miles (3.2 km) away. It was built in 1885, in less than six months, from a kit supplied by C. Kelfer of London. The corrugated iron parts in the kit were supplied by Frederick Braby and Co. under the name Sun Brand. The church was opened on St Peter's Day, 29 June 1885.

It is made of corrugated iron with a timber frame on a brick base, and has a gabled roof and a west porch. The windows and doors are in Gothic style. At the west end is a wooden cupola with a bell.

The interior has a nave, chancel, and vestry south of the chancel. The floor and cladding is of pine. The side windows, and the chancel window, have original coloured transfers depicting biblical figures and saints. Furnishings are original, including most of the pews, font, altar rail, and pictures of the Stations of the Cross. The reredos, dating from 1890–1910, is of stone and wood, bordered with Delft tiles.

The chancel arch has a decorative tin border on the nave side, bearing the text, from Psalm 26:6: "I will wash my hands in innocency, and so will I go to thine altar".

There were modifications in the early 21st century including kitchen fittings installed in the vestry, and some pews movable to provide an open space. The roof covering was renewed.
