= Hallmuir Ukrainian Chapel =

Church and war memorial in Lockerbie, Scotland

Coordinates: 55°05′58″N 3°22′01″W

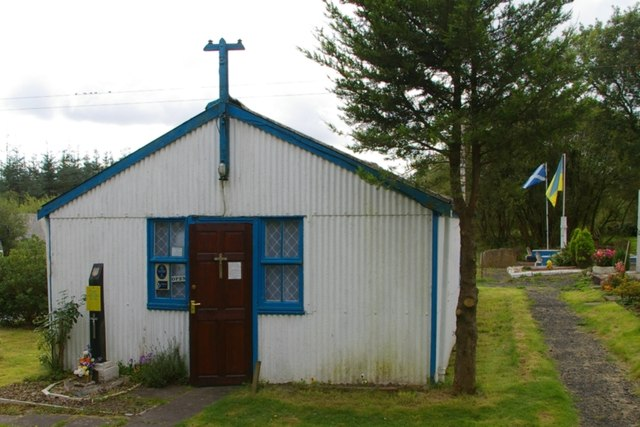
The Hallmuir Ukrainian Chapel in 2012

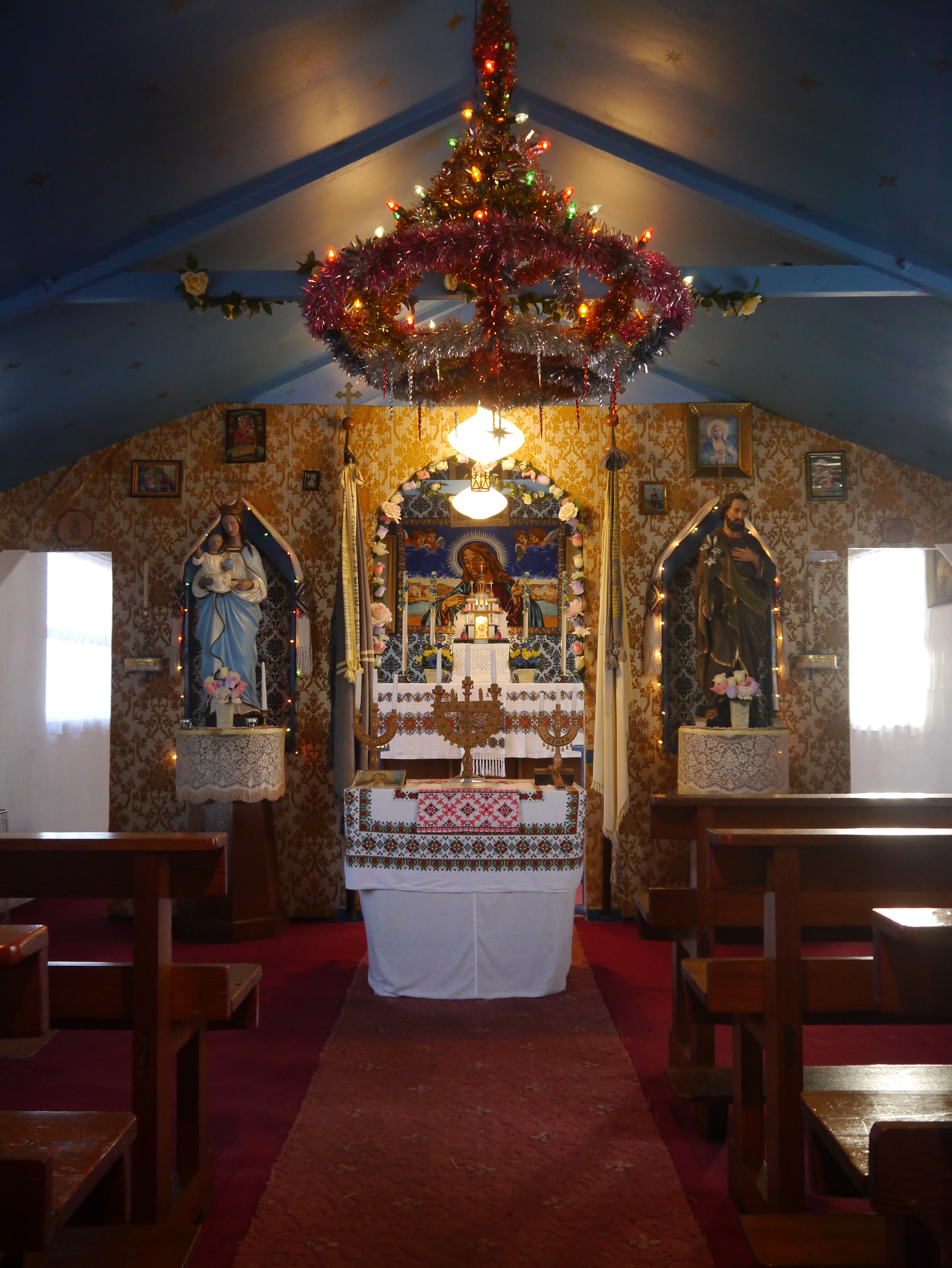
Interior in 2014

The Hallmuir Ukrainian Chapel is a chapel built at a Hallmuir prisoner of war camp near Lockerbie in Scotland. After the Second World War, this camp housed Ukrainian soldiers from the Galician Division of the Waffen SS. The soldiers built the chapel from converted army huts. It was listed in 2003 as a Category B building.

The chapel became a site for collected donations to help Ukrainians affected by the Russian invasion that began in February 2022.

== See also ==
- Tin tabernacle
- Italian Chapel
