= Listed buildings in Caythorpe, Nottinghamshire =

Caythorpe is a civil parish in the Newark and Sherwood district of Nottinghamshire, England. The parish contains five listed buildings that are recorded in the National Heritage List for England. All the listed buildings are designated at Grade II, the lowest of the three grades, which is applied to "buildings of national importance and special interest". The parish contains the village of Caythorpe and the surrounding area. All the listed buildings are in the village, and consist of two houses, two former workshops and a church.

== Buildings ==
| Name and location | Photograph | Date | Notes |
|---|---|---|---|
| The Croft; 53.00641°N 0.98148°W | | Early 17th century | The cottage has the remains of timber framing with brick nogging, the rest encased in red brick with a blue brick band, and a pantile roof. There is a single storey and attics, and two bays. On the front are a doorway and casement windows. |
| Ivy Cottage; 53.00313°N 0.97658°W | | Late 18th century | The house is in red brick, and has a pantile roof with brick coped gables and kneelers. There are two storeys and an attic, and three bays. Steps lead up to the central doorway that has a fanlight and a concrete wedge lintel. The windows are tripartite casements with segmental heads. |
| Framework-knitters workshop, Bridge Cottage; 53.00357°N 0.97731°W | | Early 19th century | The former workshop is in brick with a pantile roof, a single storey and two bays. The doorway is in the gable end, and the windows are large casements. |
| Framework-knitters workshop, Home Farm; 53.00245°N 0.97448°W | | Early 19th century | The former workshop is in brick with a raised eaves band and a pantile roof. There are two storeys and two bays. It has three doorways, two with segmental-arched heads, and the windows are large casements, some with segmental heads. |
| St Aidan's Church; 53.00414°N 0.97892°W | | 1900 | A tin tabernacle, it has a timber frame clad in galvanised corrugated iron, on a brick plinth, with a corrugated iron roof. It consists of a nave and a chancel under one roof, with vestries on each side, and a south porch. The porch has a Tudor arched door, and a pitched roof. Both the porch and the chancel end have bargeboards and an apex cross, and at the south end of the roof is a timber bellcote. |
