= St Aidan's Church, Caythorpe =

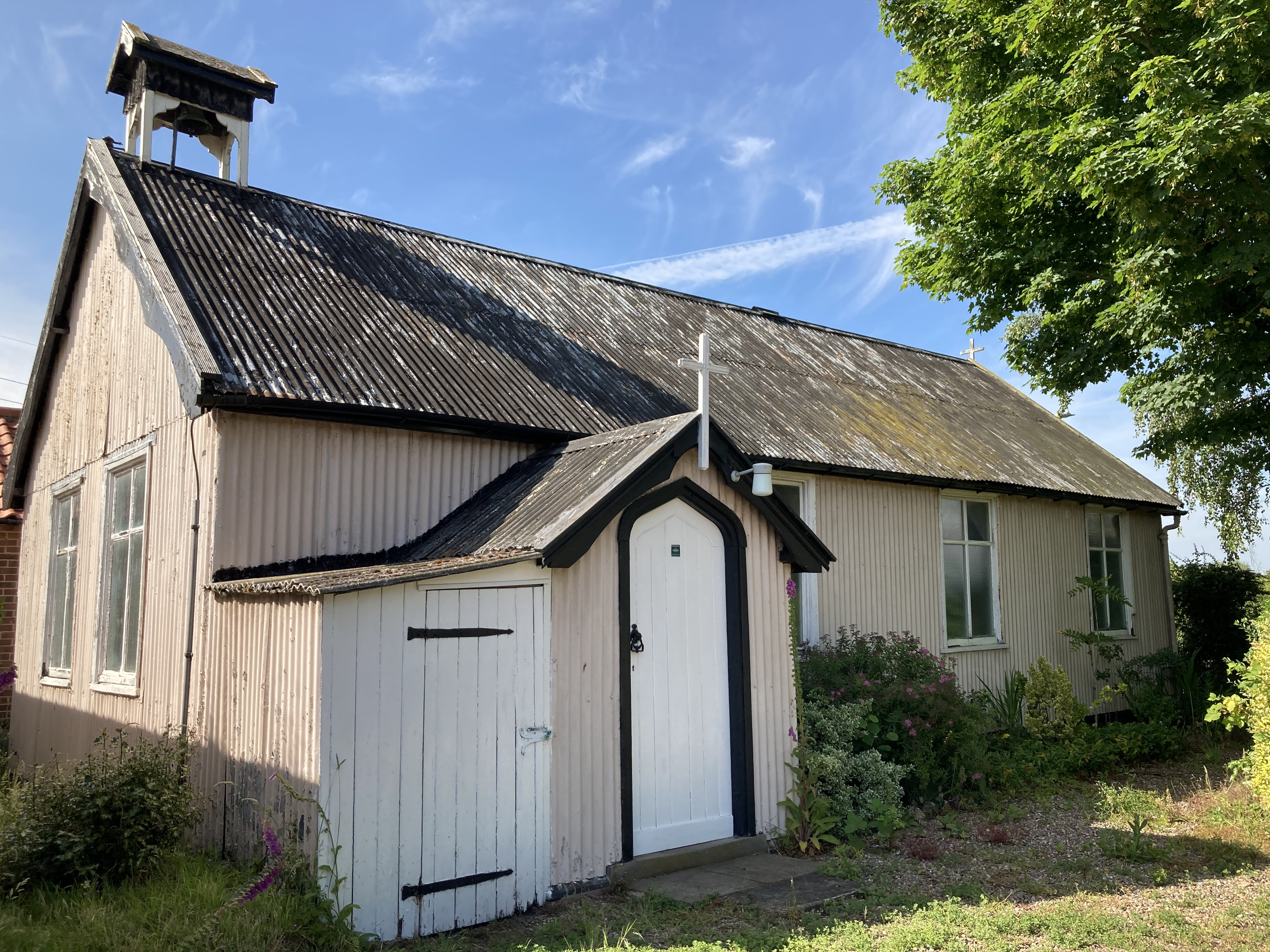
- St Aidan's Church, Caythorpe, in June 2022
- St Aidan's Church, Caythorpe
- 53°0′13.28″N 0°58′43.98″W
- OS grid reference: SK 68617 45687
- Location: Caythorpe, Nottinghamshire
- Country: England
- Denomination: Church of England

History
- Dedication: St Aidan
- Dedicated: 1900

Architecture
- Heritage designation: Grade II listed
- Designated: 18 July 2022

Administration
- Diocese: Diocese of Southwell and Nottingham
- Archdeaconry: Nottingham
- Deanery: Gedling
- Parish: Caythorpe

St Aidan's Church, Caythorpe is a Chapel of Ease in the Church of England in Caythorpe, Nottinghamshire. It is notable as being one of very few surviving 'tin tabernacles' still in ecclesiastical use. It was granted Grade II listed status by Historic England in July 2022.

== History ==
The church was built in 1900 as a Chapel of Ease in the parish of Lowdham, and it remains in a joint parish with:

- St Mary's Church, Lowdham
- St John the Baptist's Church, Gunthorpe

== Organ ==
There is a pipe organ and a Canadian reed organ.

== See also ==
- Listed buildings in Caythorpe, Nottinghamshire
