= Caythorpe =

Caythorpe could be

- Caythorpe, Lincolnshire
- Caythorpe, Nottinghamshire
