= Samuel Shaw (New Zealand) =

New Zealand labour reformer

Samuel Shaw (1819–?) was a New Zealand labour reformer. He was born in Littlebury, Essex, England in about 1819.
