= Lockerbie Town Hall =

Municipal building in Lockerbie, Scotland

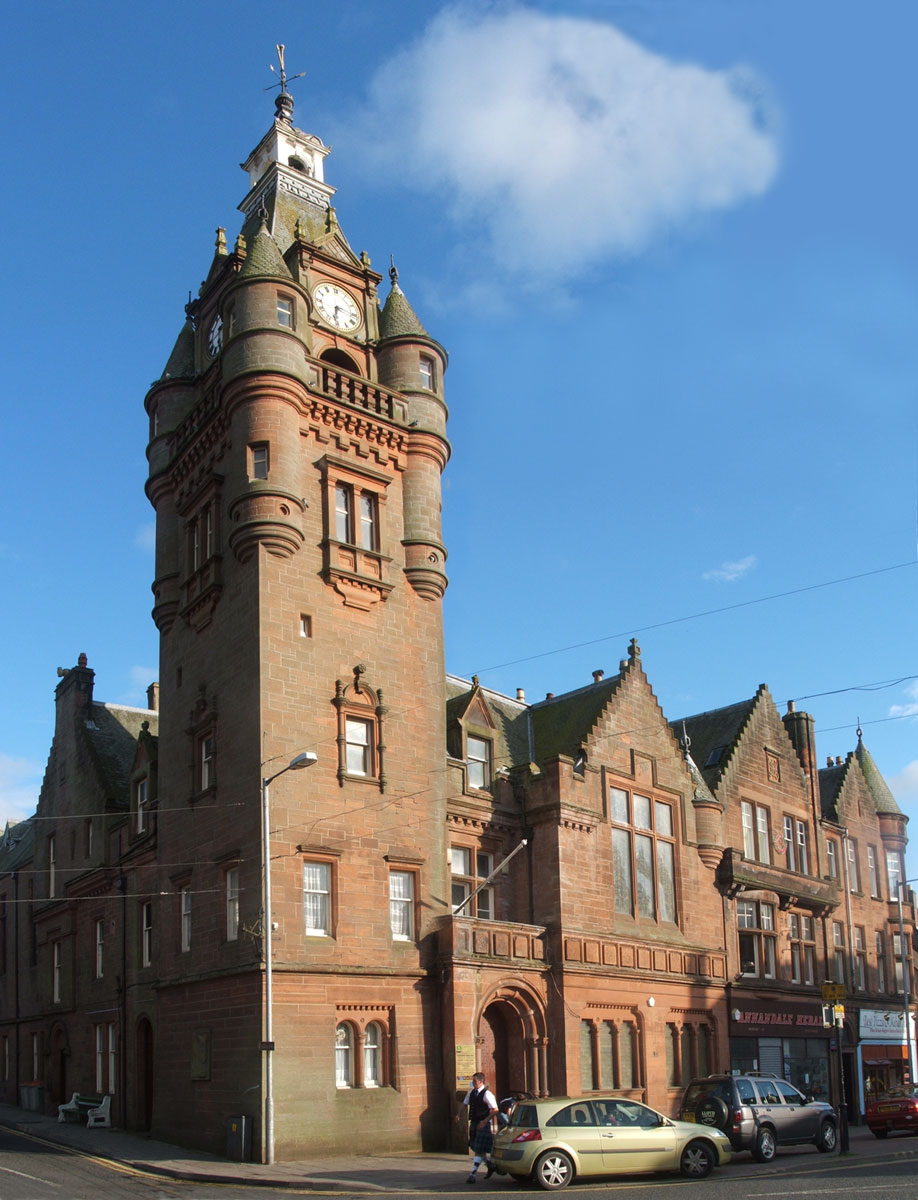
- Lockerbie Town Hall

- Shown in Dumfries and Galloway
- 55.1217°N 3.3550°W
- Location: High Street, Lockerbie

History
- Built: 1891

Site notes
- Architect(s): David Bryce and Frank Carruthers
- Architectural style: Scottish baronial style

Listed Building – Category A
- Official name: High Street, Town Hall
- Designated: 4 October 1988
- Reference no.: LB37579

Lockerbie Town Hall is a municipal building in the High Street in Lockerbie, Dumfries and Galloway, Scotland. The structure, which is used as a venue for the provision of local services, is a Category A listed building.

== History ==
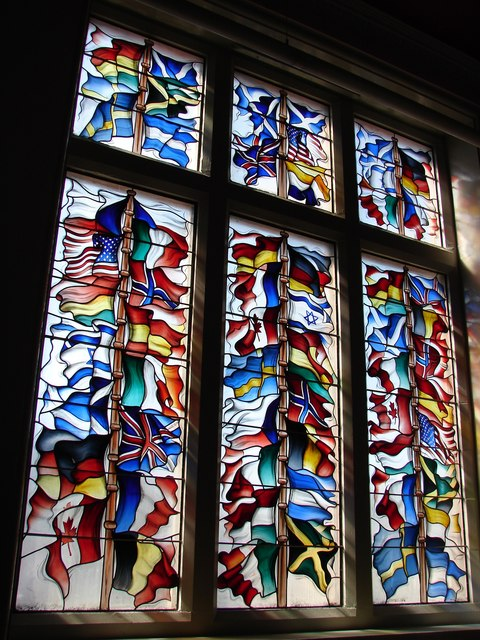
The Pan Am Flight 103 Memorial Window in the Lesser Hall

Although Lockerbie became a burgh in 1851, it was only in the mid-1870s that the burgh leaders decided to commission plans for a dedicated municipal building. The foundation stone for the new building was laid on 22 January 1889. It was designed by David Bryce and his nephew, John Bryce, in the Scottish baronial style with much of detailed work being completed by Frank Carruthers after David Bryce's death. It was built in red sandstone from Corncockle Quarry at a cost of £4,000 and was officially opened by the chairman of Jardine Matheson, Sir Robert Jardine, 1st Baronet, on 3 December 1891.

The design involved an asymmetrical main frontage with three bays facing onto the High Street. The left-hand bay took the form of a five-stage clock tower with mullioned and transomed windows in the first stage, two sash windows with cornices in the second stage, a sash window with a segmental architrave in the third stage, two closely-set sash windows flanked by pilasters supporting an entablature in the fourth stage, and a series of clock faces and bartizans in the fifth stage. The tower, which was 115 feet (35 m) high, was surmounted by a steep slate roof, a cupola and a weather vane. The central bay featured a porch with a round headed opening flanked by pairs of columns supporting a hood mould; there were mullioned and transomed windows on the first floor and a dormer window at attic level. The right-hand bay, which was step gabled, was fenestrated by two tripartite windows on the ground floor and by a mullioned and transomed window on the first floor. Internally, the principal rooms were the grand hall and the lesser hall. The architectural historian, John Gifford, was unimpressed with the design and called it "memorably unpleasant".

A two-bay extension to the south, along the high street, to accommodate a public library, was completed in 1905. A war memorial, designed by Henry Charles Fehr in the form of a winged figure of victory on a pedestal, which was intended to commemorate the lives of local service personnel who had died in the First World War, was unveiled in the presence of Lady Ethel Buchanan-Jardine (the wife of the 2nd baronet), on 7 May 1922. A cinema operated in the town hall in the 1930s and 1940s.

The town hall continued to serve as the meeting place of the burgh council for much of the 20th century but ceased to be the local seat of government when the enlarged Annandale and Eskdale District Council was formed in 1975. Following the Lockerbie bombing, in which all 243 passengers and 16 crew were killed by a bomb on Pan Am Flight 103 when it was in flight above the town in December 1988, the ground floor of the building was used as a casualty bureau and the first floor was used as a temporary mortuary until more suitable premises could be found. A stained glass window designed by John Clark, depicting the 21 flags of the countries that had been affected by the disaster, was unveiled in the lesser hall in 1991.

An extensive programme of repairs to the crumbling masonry on the building was carried out at a cost of £120,000 in 2011. A group of five life-sized sheep sculpted by David Annand and cast in brass were unveiled outside the town hall in November 2013. The sheep were intended to recall the large lamb market which had grown up in the town since the 18th century; the sculpture formed part of a wider regeneration scheme in the town.

== See also ==
- List of listed buildings in Lockerbie, Dumfries and Galloway
