= List of listed buildings in Lockerbie, Dumfries and Galloway =

This is a list of listed buildings in the town of Lockerbie in Dumfries and Galloway, Scotland.

== List ==
Name	Location	Date listed	Grid ref. (Note: Sometimes known as OSGB36, the grid reference (where provided) is based on the British national grid reference system used by the Ordnance Survey. • "Guide to National Grid". Ordnance Survey. • "Get-a-map". Ordnance Survey.)	Geo-coordinates	Notes	LB number (Note: Historic Environment Scotland assign a unique alphanumeric identifier to each designated site in Scotland, for listed buildings this always begins with "LB", for example "LB12345".)	Image
High Street, War Memorial				55°07′19″N 3°21′19″W	Category B	37563	Upload another image See more images
78, 80 High Street				55°07′19″N 3°21′19″W	Category C(S)	37576	Upload Photo
82-88 (Even Nos) High Street				55°07′19″N 3°21′18″W	Category C(S)	37577	Upload Photo
75 Mains Street				55°07′02″N 3°21′22″W	Category B	37585	Upload Photo
14 And 16 Main Street, Masonic Hall				55°07′10″N 3°21′21″W	Category C(S)	49584	Upload Photo
2, 3 Ferguson Place				55°07′21″N 3°20′57″W	Category B	37562	Upload Photo
77, 79 High Street				55°07′16″N 3°21′21″W	Category B	37573	Upload Photo
108, 110 High Street				55°07′16″N 3°21′19″W	Category C(S)	37581	Upload Photo
Arthur's Place, St George's Villa, Including Gatepiers				55°07′11″N 3°21′26″W	Category B	37557	Upload Photo
Ashgrove Terrace, All Saints Episcopal Church				55°07′23″N 3°21′36″W	Category B	37558	Upload Photo
29 High Street, King's Arms Hotel				55°07′20″N 3°21′22″W	Category C(S)	37569	Upload Photo
81, 83 High Street, Bank Of Scotland				55°07′16″N 3°21′21″W	Category B	37574	Upload Photo
1, 3 And 5 Station Road, Tower Buildings				55°07′19″N 3°21′16″W	Category B	37578	Upload Photo
High Street, Town Hall				55°07′18″N 3°21′17″W	Category A	37579	Upload another image See more images
Lockerbie Auction Mart				55°07′32″N 3°21′10″W	Category B	37583	Upload Photo
11 St Bryde's Terrace, Dryfemount, Including Gatepiers				55°07′14″N 3°21′32″W	Category B	37587	Upload Photo
13 St Bryde's Terrace, Fairfield				55°07′13″N 3°21′31″W	Category B	37588	Upload Photo
7-11 (Odd Nos) High Street				55°07′22″N 3°21′23″W	Category C(S)	37565	Upload Photo
21, 23 High Street, Rogerson And Jamieson				55°07′21″N 3°21′22″W	Category B	37567	Upload Photo
55 High Street, Abbey National				55°07′18″N 3°21′20″W	Category B	37572	Upload Photo
Station Square Lockerbie Station				55°07′20″N 3°21′14″W	Category B	37590	Upload Photo
21-27 (Odd Nos) Townhead Street				55°07′29″N 3°21′25″W	Category B	37591	Upload Photo
92, 94, 96 High Street				55°07′18″N 3°21′18″W	Category B	37580	Upload Photo
44 Mains Street, The Old Manse, Including Boundary Walls And Outbuilding				55°07′06″N 3°21′22″W	Category B	37586	Upload Photo
Carlisle Road, Somerton House Hotel, Including Gatepiers				55°06′44″N 3°21′19″W	Category B	37561	Upload Photo
15, 17 High Street				55°07′22″N 3°21′23″W	Category C(S)	37566	Upload Photo
43 High Street				55°07′19″N 3°21′21″W	Category C(S)	37570	Upload Photo
47, 49 High Street, Royal Bank Of Scotland				55°07′19″N 3°21′20″W	Category C(S)	37571	Upload Photo
Arthur's Place, Holy Trinity Roman Catholic Church				55°07′13″N 3°21′22″W	Category B	37556	Upload Photo
Bridge Street, Library				55°07′18″N 3°21′16″W	Category B	37559	Upload Photo
Bridge Street, St Cuthbert's Church And Hall (Church Of Scotland)				55°07′18″N 3°21′07″W	Category B	37560	Upload Photo
High Street, Dryfesdale And Trinity Parish Church, Churchyard And Lodge (Church Of Scotland)				55°07′25″N 3°21′25″W	Category B	37564	Upload Photo
25, 27 High Street, Clydesdale Bank				55°07′21″N 3°21′22″W	Category B	37568	Upload Photo
10 High Street, Dryfesdale Parish Church Hall				55°07′24″N 3°21′22″W	Category B	37575	Upload Photo
27 Mains Street				55°07′09″N 3°21′23″W	Category C(S)	37584	Upload Photo
112 High Street, Blue Bell Hotel				55°07′16″N 3°21′20″W	Category B	37582	Upload Photo
Station Road, Black Bull Inn				55°07′19″N 3°21′16″W	Category C(S)	37589	Upload Photo

== Key ==
The scheme for classifying buildings in Scotland is:

- Category A: "buildings of national or international importance, either architectural or historic; or fine, little-altered examples of some particular period, style or building type."
- Category B: "buildings of regional or more than local importance; or major examples of some particular period, style or building type, which may have been altered."
- Category C: "buildings of local importance; lesser examples of any period, style, or building type, as originally constructed or moderately altered; and simple traditional buildings which group well with other listed buildings."

In March 2016 there were 47,288 listed buildings in Scotland. Of these, 8% were Category A, and 50% were Category B, with the remaining 42% being Category C.
