= Shepperdine =

Village in Gloucestershire, England

Coordinates: 51.65°N 2.55°W

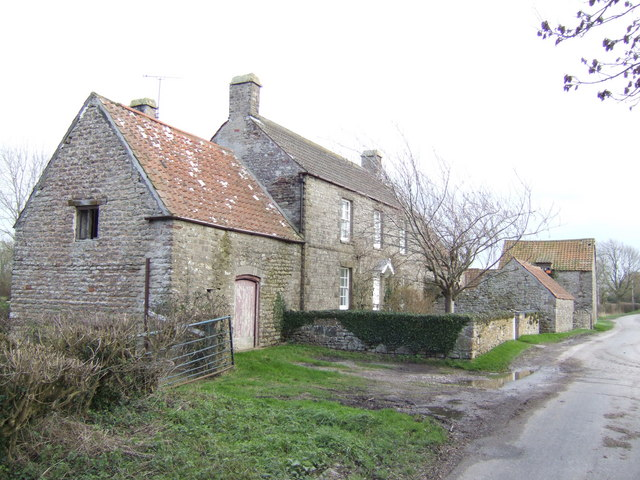

- Location within Gloucestershire
- OS grid reference: ST6295
- Civil parish: Oldbury on Severn
- Unitary authority: South Gloucestershire
- Ceremonial county: Gloucestershire
- Region: South West
- Country: England
- Sovereign state: United Kingdom
- Post town: Bristol
- Postcode district: BS35
- Dialling code: 01454
- Police: Avon and Somerset
- Fire: Avon
- Ambulance: South Western
- UK Parliament: Thornbury and Yate

Shepperdine is a small village in the parish of Oldbury-on-Severn in South Gloucestershire, England, with a border with Stroud District. The land lies wholly on the flood plain of the River Severn.

The name, first recorded in 1215 as Shepewardin, means "sheep enclosure", from the Old English sceāp "sheep" and worthiġn "enclosure or farm".

== Landmarks ==
Shepperdine was well known as the location of a pub on the banks of the Severn, known as the Windbound (once formally known as the New Inn). The Windbound closed in 2004 and became a residential home, which itself closed. The building was demolished in 2015.

Shepperdine has a Church of England chapel of ease (small church) dedicated to St Mary next to Manor Farm in Nupdown Road. It is a tin tabernacle. The ecclesiastical parish is Oldbury on Severn, whose cleric is the vicar of Thornbury and that small town was its medieval (ancient) parish; it is centred 3 miles (4.8 km) south-east.

Shepperdine House features an early C19 facade, and has "three bays, with cornice and parapet, and square-columned porch".

In a field to the northeast of the hamlet items of Roman and early medieval pottery have been unearthed.

== Nuclear power plant project ==
In the summer of 2009, the German power company E.ON started to acquire land from local farmers with the intention of constructing of a 3,300 megawatt nuclear power station on the banks of the River Severn. They formed a joint venture with German power company RWE. The two companies bought the existing Oldbury and Wylfa Magnox Nuclear Power Stations from the Nuclear Decommissioning Authority, for the sum of £500 million. RWE and E.ON formed a company called Horizon to proceed with the development. In March 2012 it was announced that they had decided not to go ahead with the construction, but in 2014 Horizon bought the former pub, the Windbound, for demolition to make way for the new power station.
