= Italian Chapel =

Chapel in Orkney built by Italian prisoners of war

Coordinates: 58.8897°N 2.8901°W

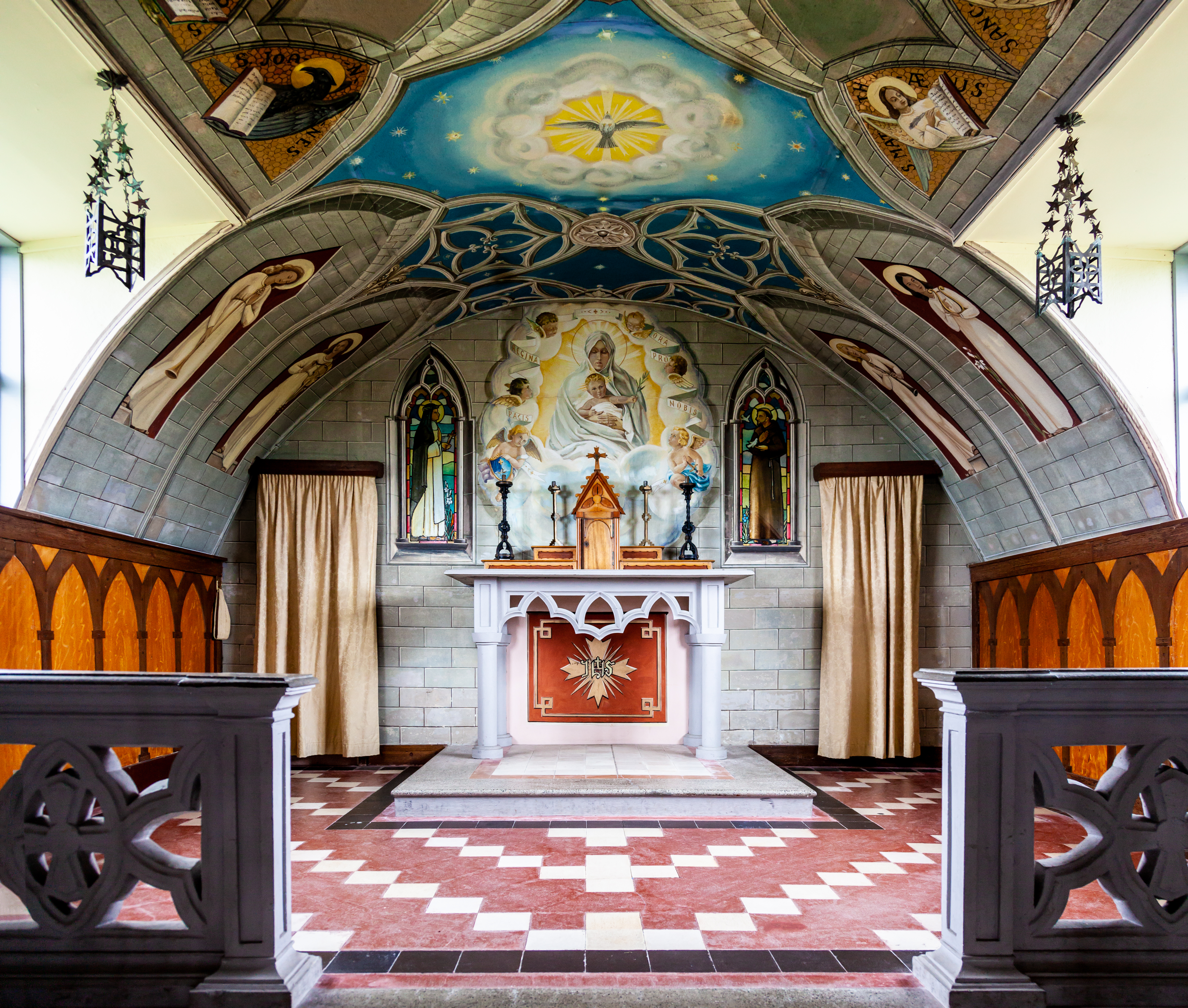
The Italian Chapel, interior

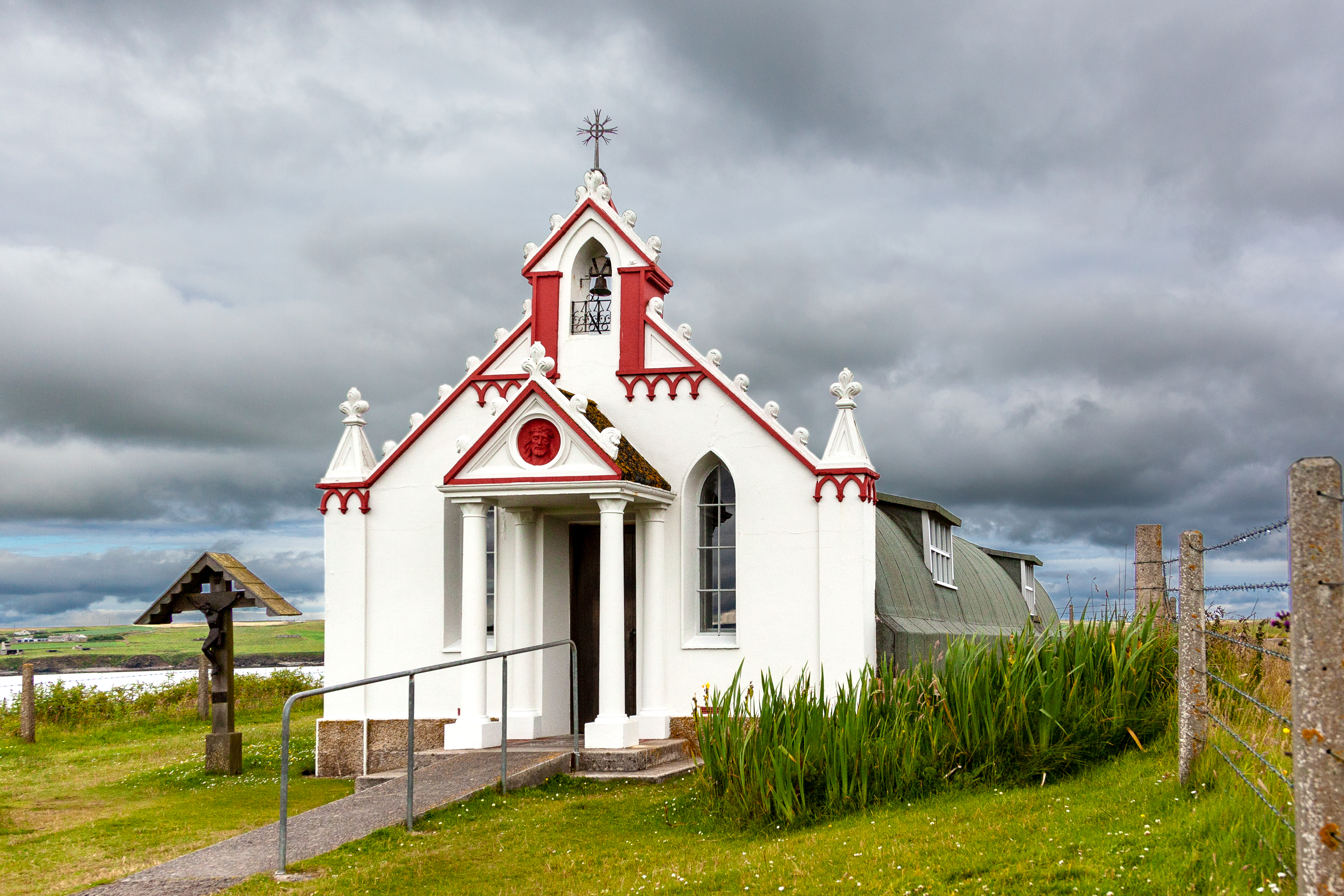
Exterior of the chapel

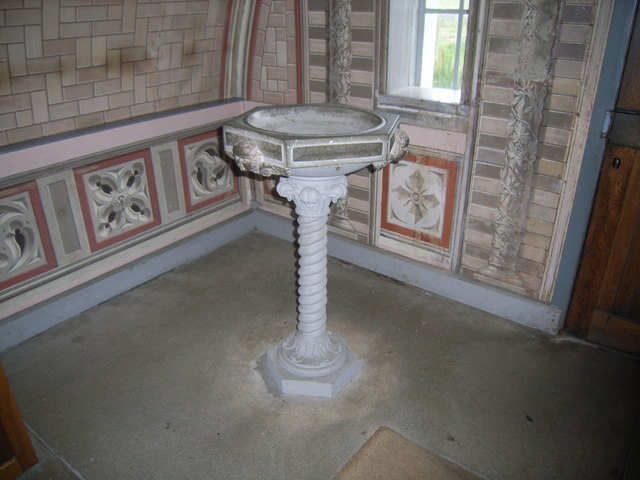
Font of the Italian Chapel

The Italian Chapel is a highly ornate Catholic chapel on Lamb Holm in Orkney, Scotland. It was built during the Second World War by Italian prisoners of war, who were housed on the previously uninhabited island while they constructed the Churchill Barriers to the east of Scapa Flow. Only the concrete foundations of the other buildings of the prisoner-of-war camp survive. The chapel was not completed until after the end of the war, and was restored in the 1960s and again in the 1990s. It is a popular tourist attraction, and a Category A listed building.

It is in the Roman Catholic Parish of Our Lady & St Joseph in Orkney, part of the Roman Catholic Diocese of Aberdeen.

== Construction ==
550 Italian prisoners of war, captured in North Africa during the Second World War, were brought to Orkney in 1942. They worked on the construction of the Churchill Barriers, four causeways created to block sea access to Scapa Flow. 200 were based at Camp 60 on Lamb Holm.

The chapel was constructed from limited materials by the prisoners in the form of a tin tabernacle, and comprises two Nissen huts joined end-to-end. The corrugated interior was then covered with plasterboard and the altar and altar rail were constructed from concrete left over from work on the barriers. Most of the interior decoration was done by Domenico Chiocchetti, a prisoner from Moena in Trentino, northern Italy.

When his fellow prisoners were released shortly before the end of the war, Chiocchetti remained on the island to finish decorating the newly consecrated chapel.

== Preservation ==
The chapel is used for worship and is a tourist attraction, receiving over 100,000 visitors every year. It has become a symbol of reconciliation in the United Kingdom.

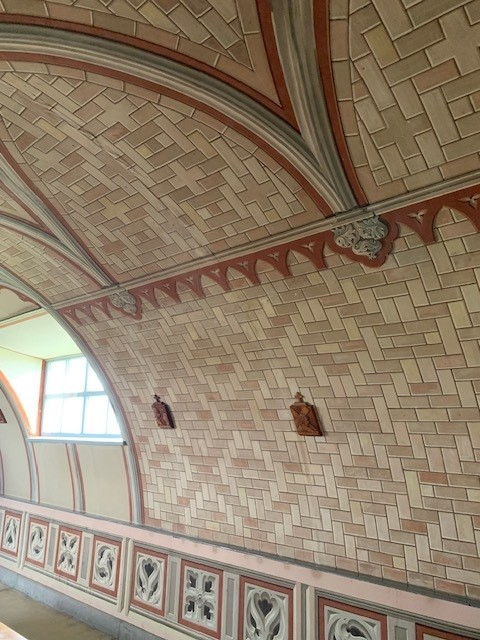
Painted stonework effect

Philip Paris wrote two books, one fiction and one non-fiction, about the building of the chapel. The 2009 novel The Chapel at the Edge of the World by Kirsten McKenzie covers the chapel's building.

In 2014, a special Mass was held at the chapel to mark its 70th anniversary.

In 2015, professional art restorer Antonella Papa offered her services to restore the chapel's frescoes, spending a month on the work. She continued this work with the help of local volunteers at the end of October 2017.

== Architectural details ==
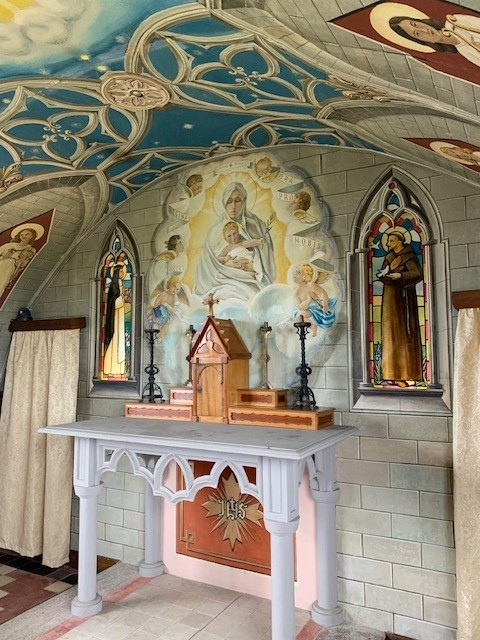
Chapel interior

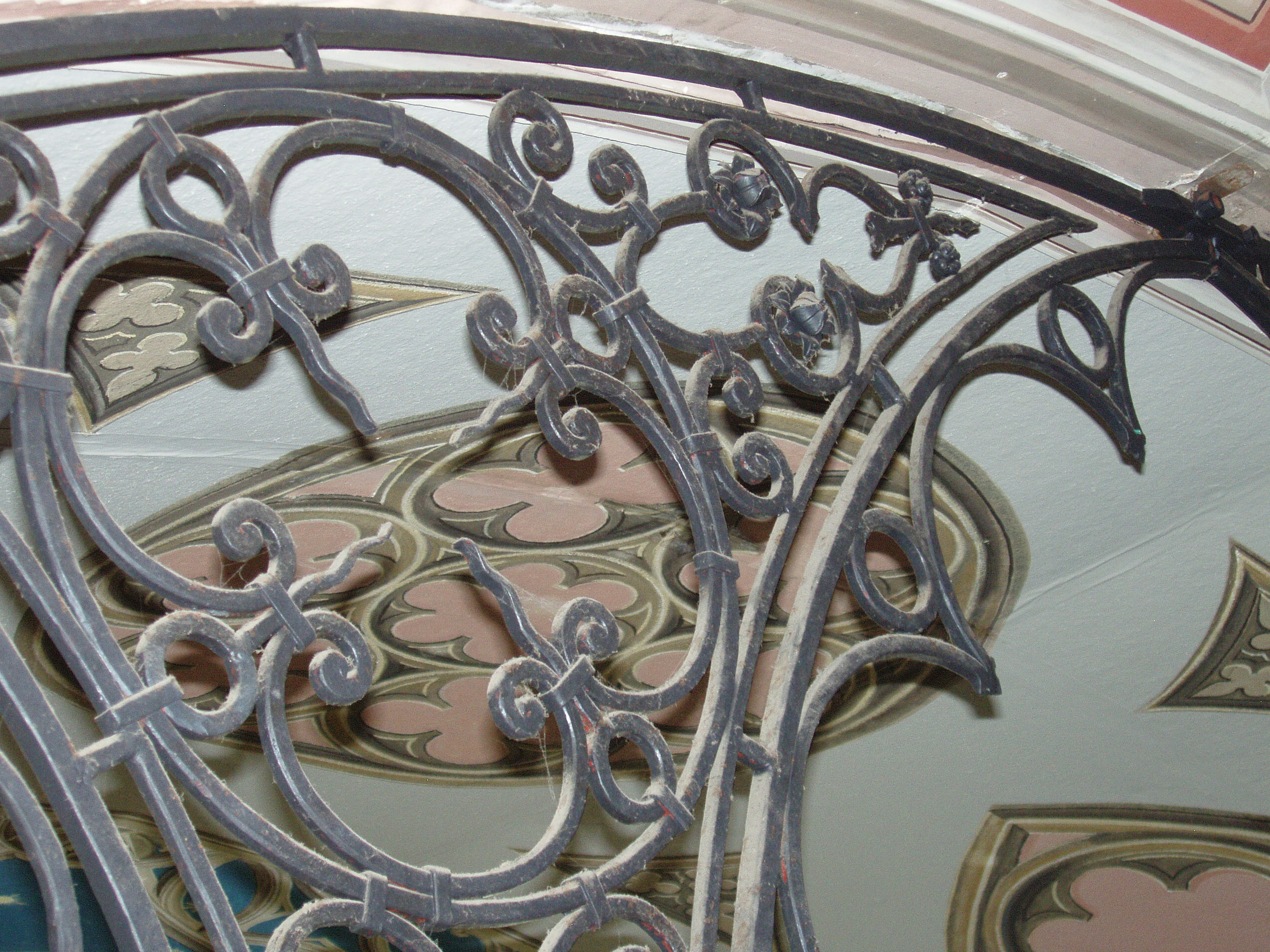
Interior metalwork detail

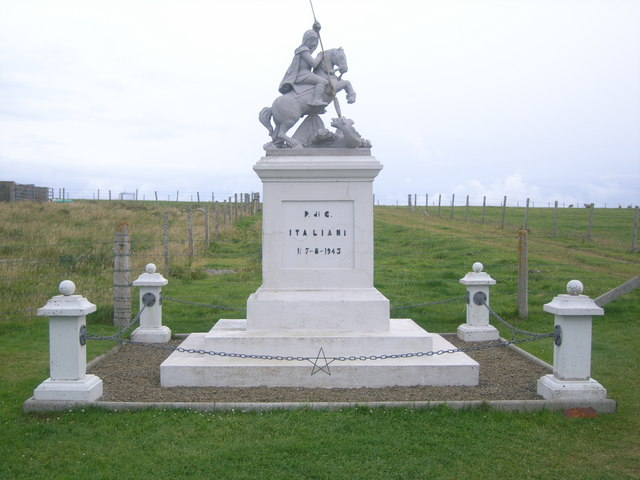
War memorial, including a statue of Saint George, outside the chapel

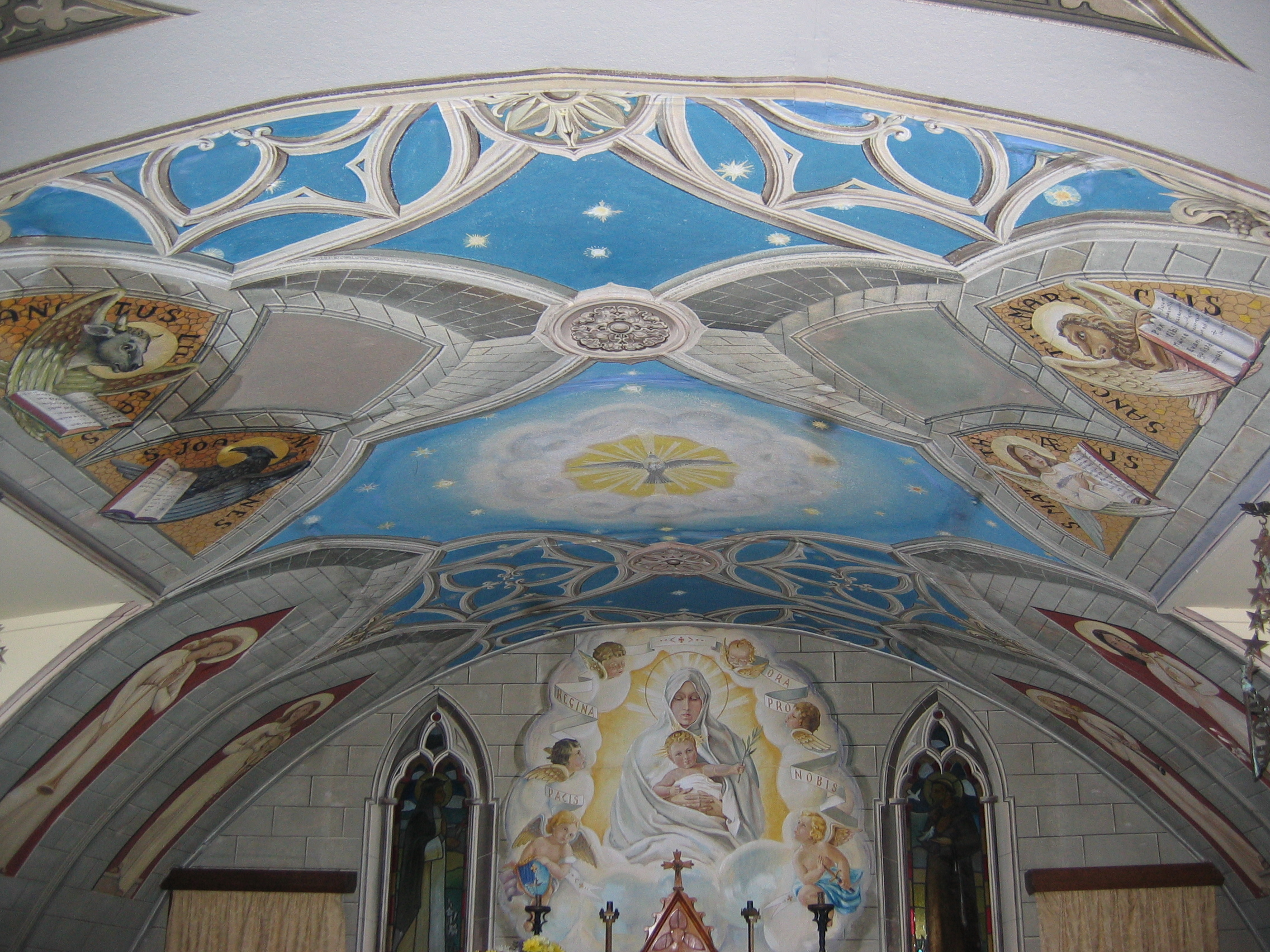
Detail of murals

== Further information ==
In August 2014, three hand-carved wooden Stations of the Cross were stolen from the Chapel. They have not been recovered, but CCTV has been installed.

A special Mass was celebrated by Papal Ambassador Antonio Mennini and former Glasgow Archbishop Mario Conti to mark the 70th anniversary of the Chapel. Pope Francis sent a special message to mark the occasion.
