= Littlebury Green =

Village in Essex, England

Coordinates: 52.0244°N 0.16805°E

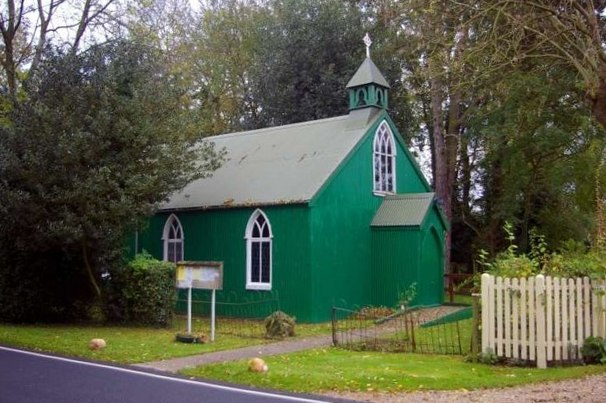
- St Peter's Church

- Location within Essex
- OS grid reference: TL488384
  - London: 36 mi (58 km) SSW
- Civil parish: Littlebury
- District: Uttlesford
- Shire county: Essex
- Region: East
- Country: England
- Sovereign state: United Kingdom
- Post town: SAFFRON WALDEN
- Postcode district: CB11
- Dialling code: 01799
- Police: Essex
- Fire: Essex
- Ambulance: East of England
- UK Parliament: North West Essex

Littlebury Green is a village in the civil parish of Littlebury and the district of Uttlesford in Essex, England.

Littlebury Green is one of three settlements, the others Catmere End and Chapel Green, at the west and south-west of Littlebury parish, and subordinate to the parish village of Littlebury near the north-east border with the parish of Saffron Walden. The village is on Littlebury Green Road, 3 miles (5 km) west from the town of Saffron Walden, 12 miles (19 km) south from the city of Cambridge, and 23 miles (37 km) north-east from the county town and city of Chelmsford. The M11 motorway runs north to south 1 mile (1.6 km) east from the village.

== History ==
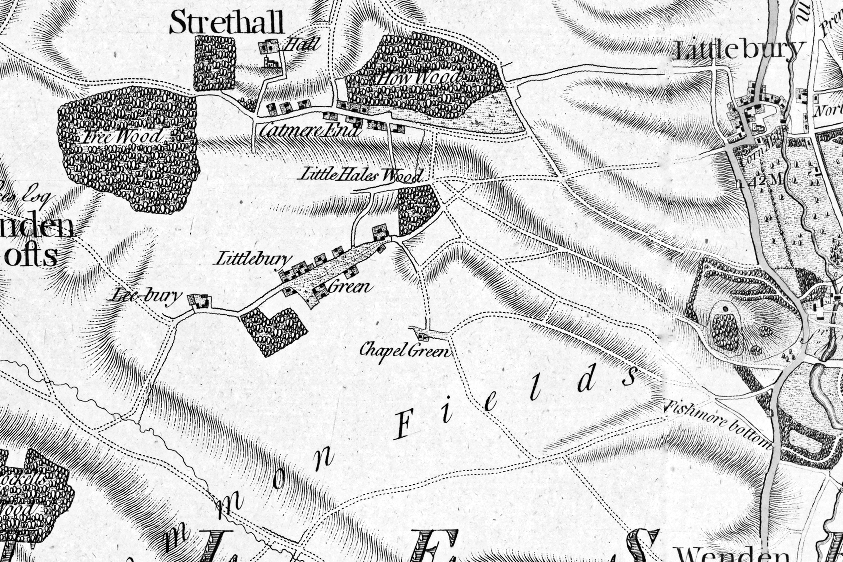
Littlebury Green in 1777

During Roman Britain, Littlebury Green was named 'Stretley' after its position on the Ermine Street route towards Chesterford. A 16th-century will bequeathed a house at "Strelly Green commonly called Littlebury Green". White's Directory mentions the Roman road and of records referring to the settlement as 'Streetly Green'

In 1851 Littlebury Green comprised 32 houses, including two beer-houses. By 2008 the village contained 53 houses.

From 1882 to 1933 Littlebury Green was described as being 2 miles (3 km) west-southwest from Littlebury church. A small chapel of ease, built in 1885 by subscription and dedicated to St Peter, held seating for 150. One of the principal landowners was Lord Braybrooke who was also lord of the manor. Within the village were two public houses, the Rose Inn and the Hoops Inn, and in 1933, also a tobacconist.

== Governance ==
Local governance for the parish, including Littlebury Green, is served by Littlebury Parish Council.

== Landmarks ==
There are several Grade II listed buildings in Littlebury Green: St Peter's Church; the former Hoops public house, a timber-framed house dating to the 17th century; the adjacent Green Farmhouse, a c.1600 two-storey timber-framed and plastered house, with adjoining brick barn; Caitlin's Farmhouse, a c.1600 timber-framed and plastered house with brick-faced bottom storey; and Howe Hall, a 19th-century brick house with its adjoining 18th- 19th-century timber-framed and plastered dovecote.
