= Lockerbie =

Town in Dumfries and Galloway, Scotland

Coordinates: 55°07′19″N 03°21′19″W

Lockerbie: Scottish Gaelic: Locarbaidh
- Market town
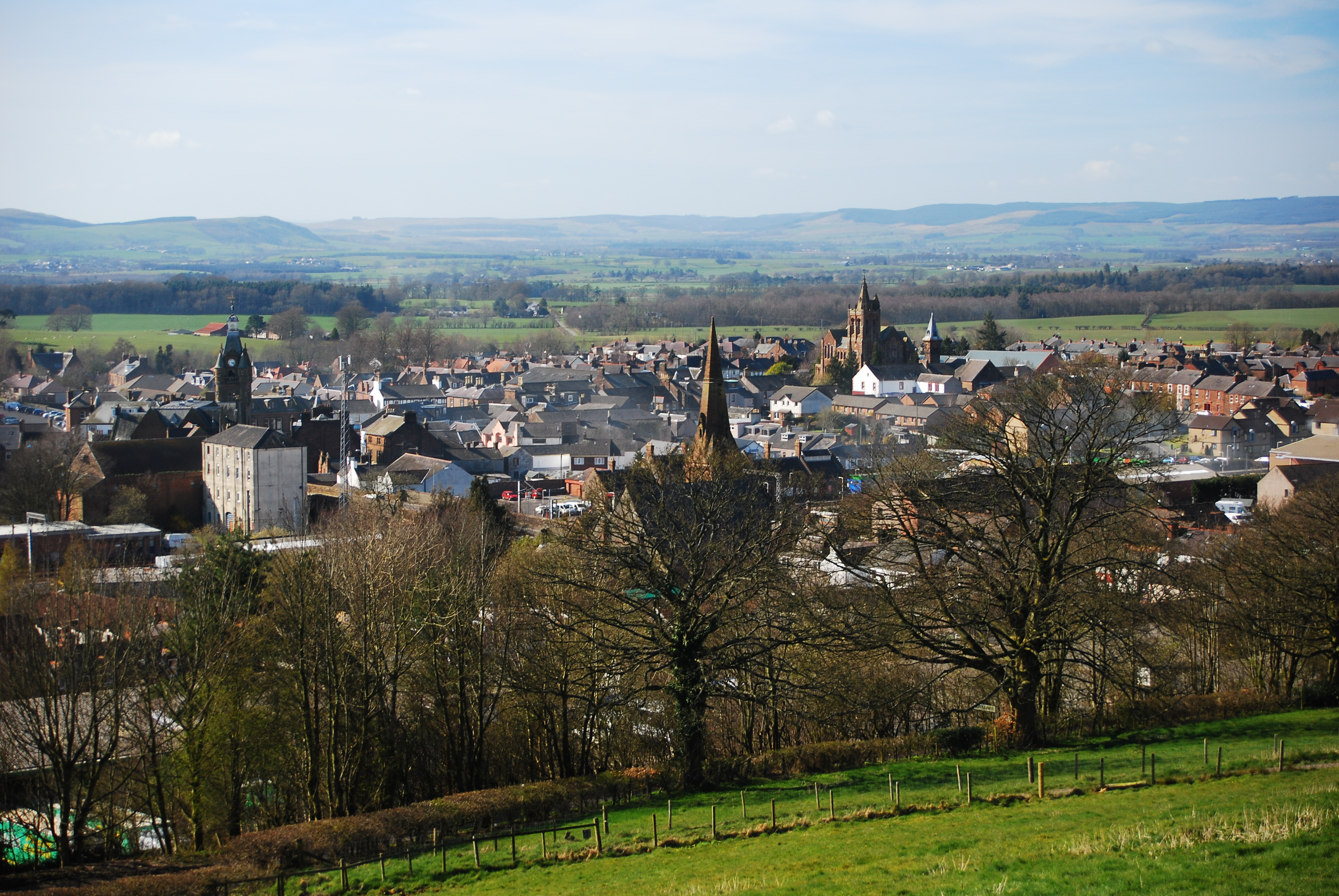
- Skyline over Lockerbie

- Location within Dumfries and Galloway
- Population: 4,412 (2022)
- OS grid reference: NY135815
  - Edinburgh: 58 mi (93 km)
  - London: 283 mi (455 km)
- Community council: Lockerbie & District
- Council area: Dumfries and Galloway
- Lieutenancy area: Dumfriesshire
- Country: Scotland
- Sovereign state: United Kingdom
- Post town: LOCKERBIE
- Postcode district: DG11
- Dialling code: 01576
- Police: Scotland
- Fire: Scottish
- Ambulance: Scottish
- UK Parliament: Dumfriesshire, Clydesdale and Tweeddale
- Scottish Parliament: Dumfriesshire

Lockerbie (/ˈlɒkərbi/, Scottish Gaelic: Locarbaidh) is a historic market town in Dumfries and Galloway, south-western Scotland. The town lies near the River Annan, approximately 58 miles (93 km) south-southwest of Edinburgh, 62 miles (100 km) south-east of Glasgow, and 10 miles (16 km) east-northeast of Dumfries. The town had a population of 4,412 in 2022.

Lockerbie came to international attention in December 1988, when the wreckage of Pan Am Flight 103 crashed there following a terrorist bomb attack aboard the flight.

== Prehistory and archaeology ==
In 2006, ahead of the construction of a new primary and secondary school, archaeologists from CFA Archaeology undertook excavations. They discovered the remains of a large (27 m x 8 m) Neolithic timber hall that dated to somewhere between 3950 BC to 3700 BC. The archaeologists found it was in use for some time, as some of the posts had been replaced. Flax seeds were found in the timber hall, showing the people were processing flax. This is an extremely rare find with only one other site in Scotland showing evidence of flax production in the Neolithic period. Like with most other Neolithic timber halls, it was purposely burned down at the end of its use. There is also a Neolithic lithic-working, ritual and settlement site at Beckton Farm in Lockerbie that was excavated in the 1990s.

A Bronze Age cremation and inhumation cemetery enclosed by a possible ring-cairn was also found during the school excavation. Found in the cemetery were a Collared Urn and a copper alloy dagger of Butterwick type, which is very rare in Scotland, and analysis shows it might have been imported from Wales. The cemetery was radiocarbon dated to between 2140 BC and 1690 BC. Another Bronze Age cemetery was found at Kirkburn, Lockerbie, and excavated in the 1960s. A corn-drying kiln dating to the late medieval or early post-medieval period (1450–1800) was also discovered next to the cemetery.

Finally, an Anglian timber hall dating to 430–670 was also discovered during the school excavation. That building was built over an earlier structure that is similar to earlier British structures, which led the archaeologists to believe the Angles came into the area and replaced the local structure with their timber hall as a show of dominance. It is thought that the timber hall might be from the reign of Aethelfrith during an initial Northumbrian advance into south-west Scotland and that it was a drinking hall or meeting hall.

There is also the Torwood Roman camp next to Lockerbie. All of these sites indicated that people have been living in Lockerbie for at least 6000 years.

== History ==
=== Viking influence ===
Lockerbie has existed since at least the days of Viking influence in this part of Scotland in the period around 900. The name (originally "Loc-hard's by") means Lockard Town in Old Norse. It first entered recorded history in the 1190s in a charter of Robert de Brus, 2nd Lord of Annandale, granting the lands of Lockerbie to Adam de Carlyle. It appears as Lokardebi in 1306.

=== Battle of Dryfe Sands ===
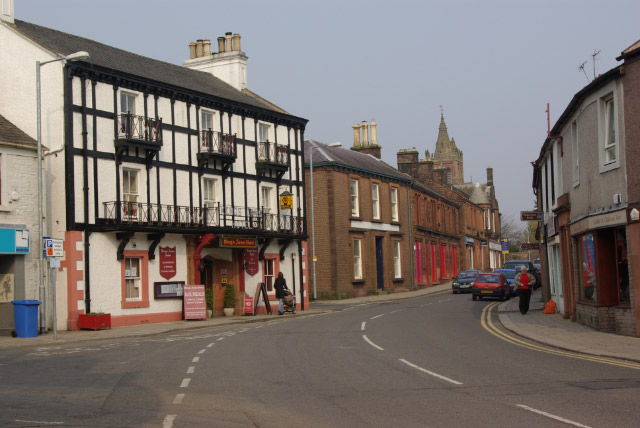
High Street

About two miles (three kilometres) west of Lockerbie on 7 December 1593, Clan Johnstone fought Clan Maxwell at the Battle of Dryfe Sands. The Johnstones killed many Maxwells involved in the battle and left many with sword cuts on their heads, leading to the expression "Lockerbie Lick".

Lockerbie's main period of growth started in 1730 when the landowners, the Johnstone family, made plots of land available along the line of the High Street, producing in effect a semi-planned settlement. By 1750, Lockerbie had become a significant town and it was a staging post on the carriage route from Glasgow to London from the 1780s.

Perhaps the most important period of growth was during the 19th century. Thomas Telford's Carlisle-to-Glasgow road was built through Lockerbie from 1816. The Caledonian Railway opened the line from Carlisle to Beattock through Lockerbie in 1847 and, later, all the way to Glasgow. From 1863 until 1966, Lockerbie was also a railway junction, serving a branch line to Dumfries. Known as the Dumfries, Lochmaben and Lockerbie Railway, it was closed to passengers in 1952 and to freight in 1966. The town is served by Lockerbie railway station.

The population at the time of the 1841 census was 1,313 inhabitants.

Lockerbie had been home to Scotland's largest lamb market since the 18th century but the arrival of the Caledonian Railway increased further its role in the cross-border trade in sheep. The railway also produced a lowering in the price of coal, allowing a gas works to be built in the town in 1855.

=== Hallmuir prisoner-of-war camp ===
About 1 1/2 miles (2.5 kilometres) south of Lockerbie, along the C92 road to Dalton, there are the remains of Hallmuir prisoner-of-war camp. After the Second World War, this camp housed Ukrainian soldiers from the Galician Division of the Waffen SS. They built a chapel from converted army huts. It was listed in 2003 as a Category B building. The chapel remains in use, currently holding Ukrainian services on the first Sunday of every alternate month.

=== Pan American 103 bombing ===
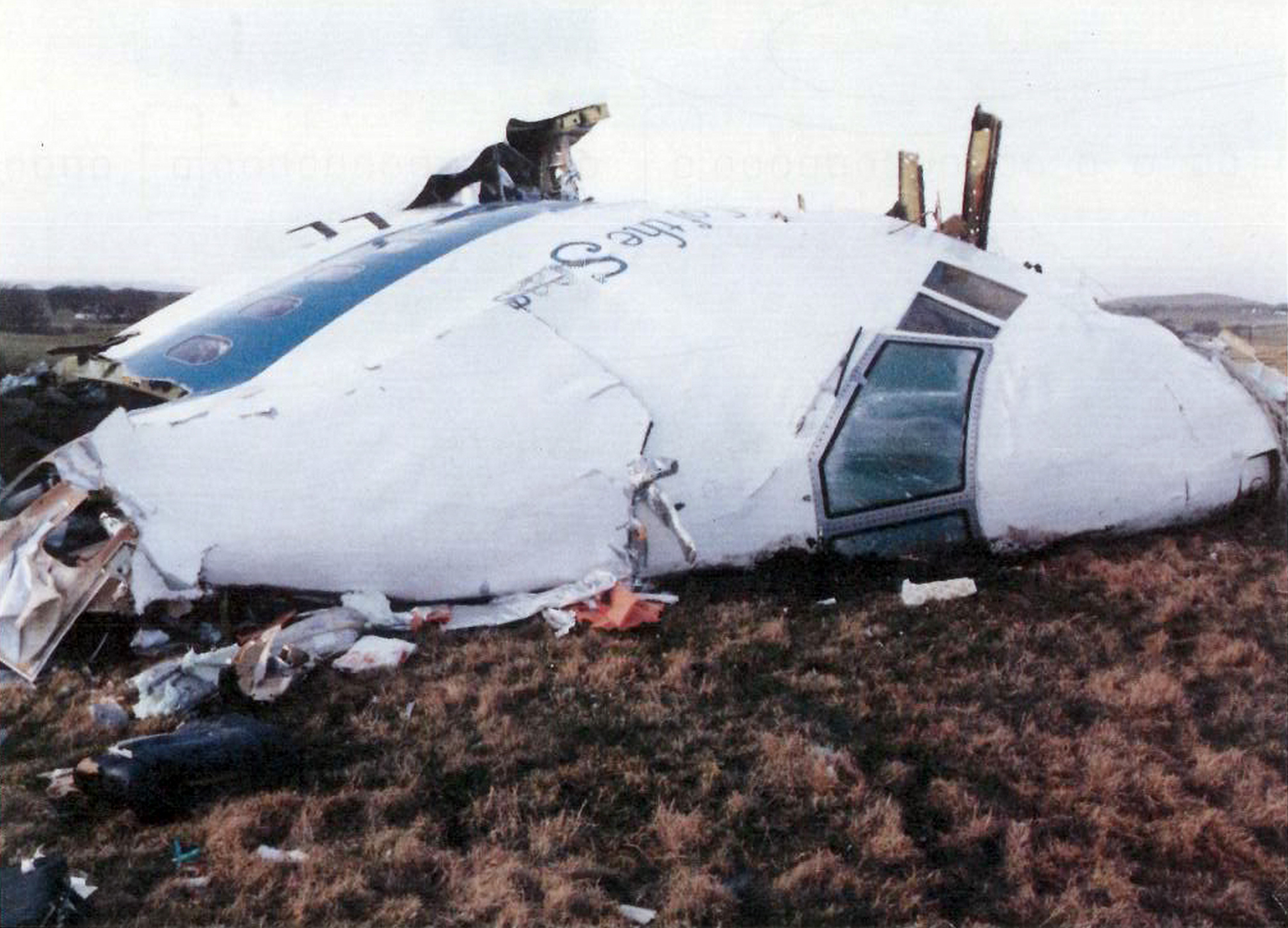
The remains of Pan Am Flight 103

Lockerbie is known internationally as the place where, on 21 December 1988, the wreckage of Pan Am Flight 103 crashed after a terrorist bomb on board detonated. In the United Kingdom, the event is often referred to as the "Lockerbie disaster" or the "Lockerbie bombing". Eleven residents of the town were killed in Sherwood Crescent, where the aircraft's wings and fuel tanks plummeted in a fiery explosion, destroying several houses and leaving a large crater, with debris causing damage to other buildings nearby; all 259 people on the flight also died. The 270 total victims were citizens of 20 different nations. The event remains the deadliest terrorist attack and aviation disaster in Britain.

Memorial walls are located at the field where the main plane wreckage landed in Lockerbie, Scotland, and at Syracuse University Main Campus (See, below). In addition, one passenger also landed near the firehouse in town, and a rosebush was planted for Syracuse University student Suzanne Miazga, niece of Joseph and Barbara Bien. Julie Ann Racino discovered the rosebush on her working trip to England, Wales and Scotland in 1990-1991, leading to a love story between George White (now deceased) of Lockerbie, Scotland and Anna Marie Miazga of Marcy, NY.

Lockerbie Academy, the town's high school, became the headquarters for the response and recovery effort after the Pan Am Flight 103 disaster. Subsequently, the academy, in cooperation with Syracuse University of Syracuse, New York, US, which lost 35 students in the bombing, established a scholarship at the university. Each year, two students spend one academic year at Syracuse University as Lockerbie Scholars before they begin their university study. The rector of Lockerbie Academy, Graham Herbert, was recognised in November 2003 at Syracuse University with the Chancellor's Medal for outstanding service. A former student of the academy, Helen Jones, was killed in the 7 July 2005 London bombings. In her memory, a new scholarship was set up, awarding £1000 towards further education to aspiring accounting students from the academy.

=== Recent history ===
Dryfesdale Lodge Visitors' Centre, formerly a cemetery worker's cottage, was opened on 25 October 2003 after extensive renovation work funded by the Lockerbie Trust and is maintained with grant assistance from Dumfries & Galloway Council. There are two exhibition rooms in the Lodge and also the Dryfesdale Room that is used as a quiet room for visitors to reflect. A permanent exhibition room displays ten history panels depicting Lockerbie's past, stretching from its prehistoric origins to 1988's terrorist attack and beyond. In the cemetery grounds nearby is the Lockerbie Memorial Garden of Remembrance.

Steven's Croft power station opened in 2008 just to the north of the town. It is the largest biomass-powered electric generator in the UK.

== Transport ==
Lockerbie railway station is a stop on the West Coast Main Line. Avanti West Coast, Lumo and TransPennine Express provide services to Edinburgh Waverley, Glasgow Central, Stirling, Liverpool Lime Street, Manchester Piccadilly, Manchester Airport and London Euston.

Bus services are provided by Houston's Minicoaches and McCall's Minicoaches; routes link the town to Annan, Lochmaben, Dumfries and Gretna.

== Culture ==
=== Architecture ===
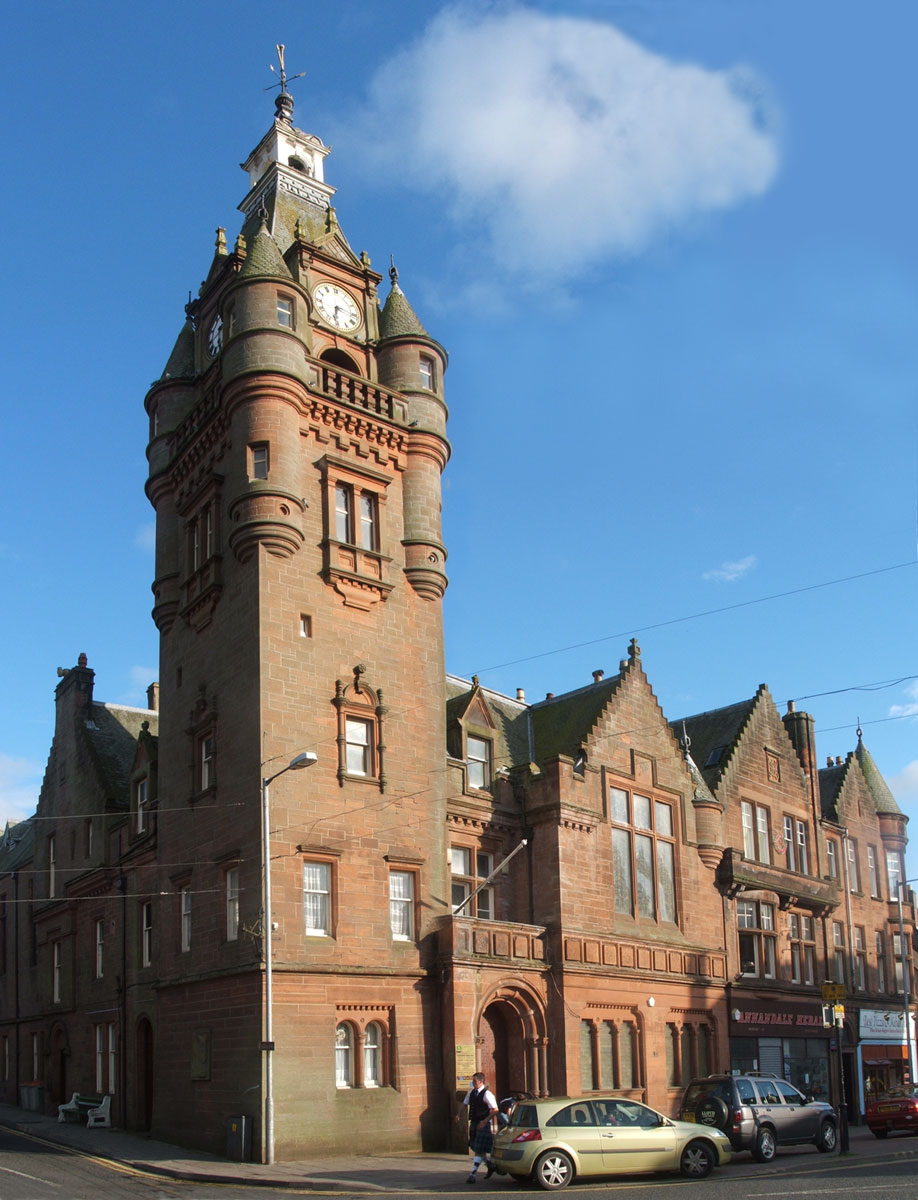
Lockerbie Town Hall, pictured in 2006

Much of Lockerbie is built from red sandstone. There are several imposing buildings near the centre, including Lockerbie Town Hall, completed in 1880.

=== Religion ===
A little to the north of the centre is the Dryfesdale Parish Church, with its brightly decorated interior. The name Dryfesdale comes from the local river, the Dryfe Water, which joins the River Annan a little to the west of the town.

=== Lockerbie House ===
Lockerbie House was built in 1814 for Sir William Douglas, 4th Baronet of Kelhead and Dame Grace Johnstone and their children: Mary, Catherine, Christian, Henry Alexander, William Robert Keith Douglas, Charles Douglas, 6th Marquess of Queensberry and John Douglas, 7th Marquess of Queensberry. It was inhabited by several different members of the Douglas family through the generations, including both Archibald Douglas, 8th Marquis of Queensberry (son of John Douglas) and his wife Caroline Margaret Clayton (daughter of General Sir William Robert Clayton MP) and their children British mountaineer Lord Francis William Bouverie Douglas, Lady Gertrude Georgiana Douglas, John Sholto Douglas, Viscount Drumlanrig and later the 9th Marquess of Queensberry, clergyman Lord Archibald Edward Douglas and the twins Lord James Douglas and Lady Florence Dixie (who married Sir Alexander Beaumont Churchill Dixie, 11th Baronet).

Lockerbie House is an important establishment within Lockerbie, in the past having been owned mainly by the Johnstone Baronets and Douglas family (including Arthur Johnstone-Douglas) together with most of the land and housing within the town. Like much of Lockerbie, this Georgian house is built of old red sandstone. It has about 40 bedrooms and is situated within 78 acres (32 hectares) of secluded woodland and gardens, with several outbuildings including a gatehouse, a two-acre (0.8-hectare) walled garden, croquet lawn, orchards, helipad and a hunting dog pen. Until recently, there was also a large stable block but that has been partly converted into a house; the remaining stables are used by a local riding school. This large property has frequently been used as a country house hotel. The house is now owned by outdoor pursuits company Manor Adventure; it serves as a centre for school activity courses and family adventure holidays.

=== Sport ===
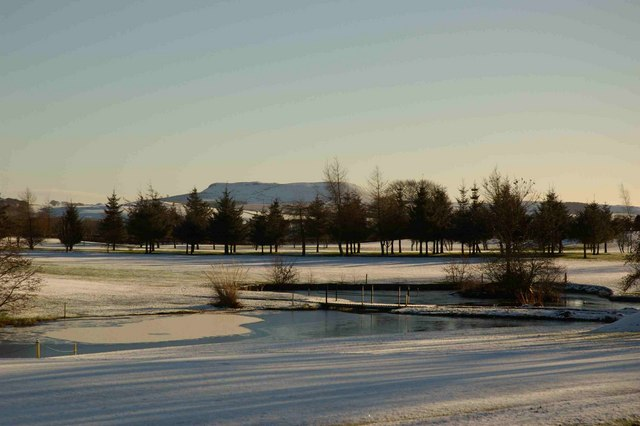
Lockerbie golf course

John Sholto Douglas was a patron of sport and a noted boxing enthusiast. In 1866, he was one of the founders of the Amateur Athletic Club, now the Amateur Athletic Association of England. The following year the club published a set of twelve rules for conducting boxing matches. The rules had been drawn up by John Graham Chambers, but appeared under Queensberry's sponsorship and are universally known as the "Marquess of Queensberry rules".

Located across the road from Lockerbie Academy, Lockerbie Ice Rink was built in 1966 and is one of the oldest indoor ice rinks in the United Kingdom. The Ice rink was used to store the bodies from the Pan Am 103 bombing.

The town's senior football club is Mid-Annandale, who compete in the South of Scotland Football League. The club play at the recently refurbished King Edward Park.

== Education ==
Lockerbie has a secondary school and a primary school that are in the same building. The school previously had another secondary school that was built in the 1960’s and demolished in 2010 for a residential area. Lockerbie has a school building called Lockerbie Old School (Previously Dryfesdale Public School and Lockerbie Primary). Lockerbie Academy also has a Scholarship with Syracuse University after the Lockerbie Bombing.

== Notable people ==
- Hannah Fleming (born 1991), curler and former world junior champion skip.
- Jimmy Jamieson (1867–unknown), footballer who played for Everton and The Wedensday.
- David Jardine (1867–unknown), footballer who played for Bootle, Nelson, Everton and Wrexham.
- Sir William Douglas, 4th Baronet (1730–1783), politician who represented Dumfries Burghs in the House of Commons.
- Mary Auld (1893–1984), politician and woman's organiser.
- John Jardine Paterson (1920–2000), businessman.
- Anna Sloan (born 1991), curler who was the longtime third with the Eve Muirhead rink.
- Philip Tibbetts, officer of arms as the March Pursuivant of Arms Extraordinary at the Court of the Lord Lyon in Edinburgh.
- Lorna Vevers (born 1980), curler who played lead for Team Great Britain at the 2010 Winter Olympics.

== See also ==
- Lockerbie Town Hall
- All Saints Church, Lockerbie
- Dumfries and Galloway
- List of listed buildings in Lockerbie, Dumfries and Galloway
