= Littlebury =

Village in Essex, England

Coordinates: 52.033°N 0.217°E

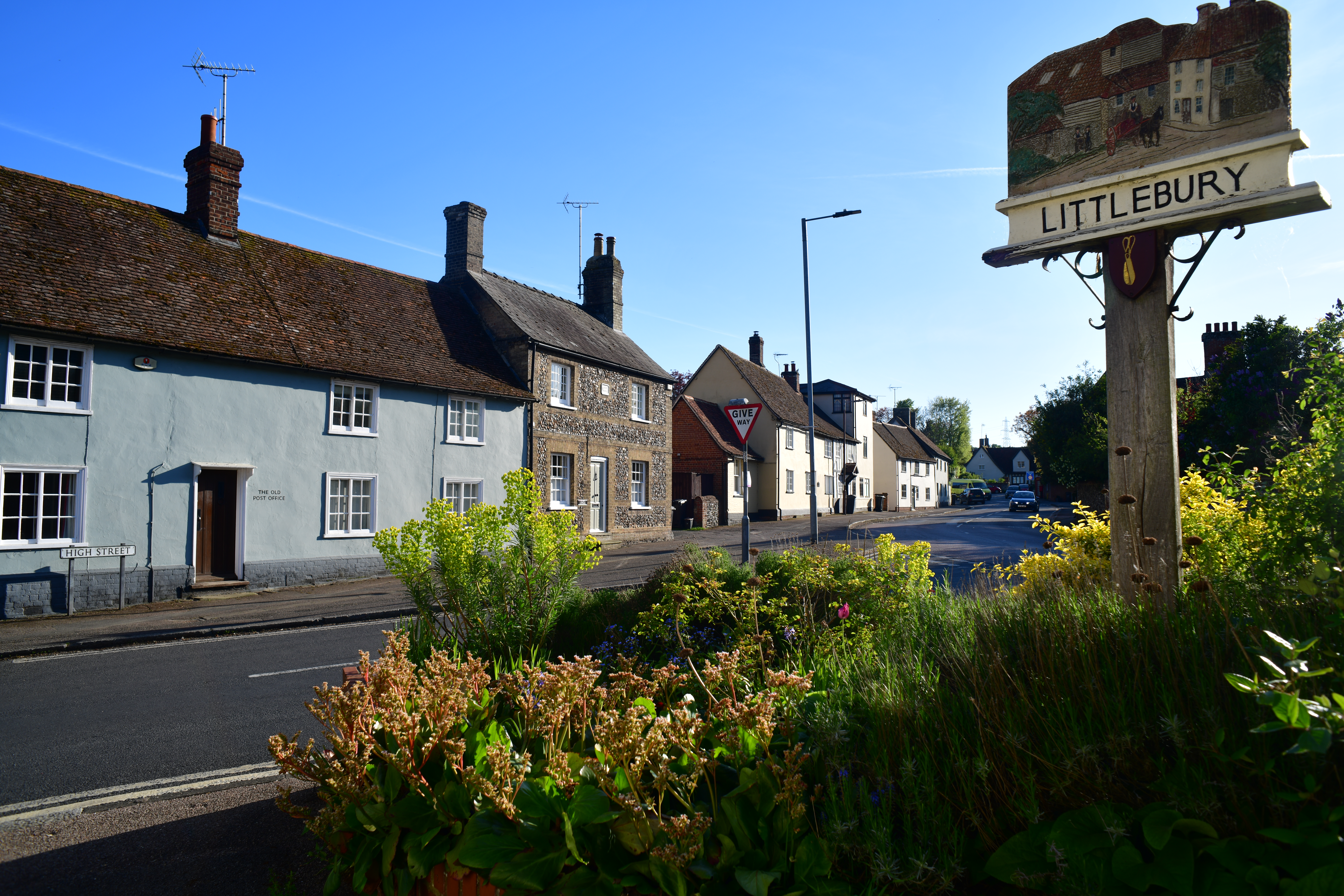

- Location within Essex
- Population: 842 (Parish, 2021)
- OS grid reference: TL516396
- Civil parish: Littlebury
- District: Uttlesford
- Shire county: Essex
- Region: East
- Country: England
- Sovereign state: United Kingdom
- Post town: SAFFRON WALDEN
- Postcode district: CB11
- Dialling code: 01799
- Police: Essex
- Fire: Essex
- Ambulance: East of England
- UK Parliament: North West Essex

Littlebury is a village and civil parish in the Uttlesford district, north-west Essex, England. The village is approximately a mile and a half from the market town of Saffron Walden, 12 miles (20 km) south from Cambridge, the nearest city, and 23 miles (37 km) north-east from the county town and city of Chelmsford.

The parish of Littlebury includes the village of Littlebury Green and the hamlets of Catmere End and Chapel Green at the west, and parts of the estate of Audley End at the south-east. At the 2021 census the parish had a population of 842.

== History ==
The area has been inhabited since prehistoric times, with Bronze Age tools having been found at Little Chesterford and Iron Age sherds to the east of the village. Ring Hill Fort to the west of Audley End is believed to date from the Iron Age, and there is significant evidence of Roman settlement.

The name Littlebury first appears in a 10th-century will as lytlan byrig and in 1008 as Lithanberi.

The village is located on the medieval London to Newmarket road (now the B1383 and A11) as well as the River Cam. A Roman road crossed the parish at Littlebury Green, which is referred to as Streetly Green in some historic records.

The parish was owned by Ely Abbey from the ninth century, and was retained by the Crown following Dissolution. In 1601 it was sold to Thomas Sutton and in 1603 fell to the Earl of Suffolk. It passed between the Earls of Suffolk, owners of Audley End house, until in 1762 it was bequeathed to Lord Braybrooke.

The Cambridge to Liverpool Street line passes through the village and it formerly had its own station.

== Church ==
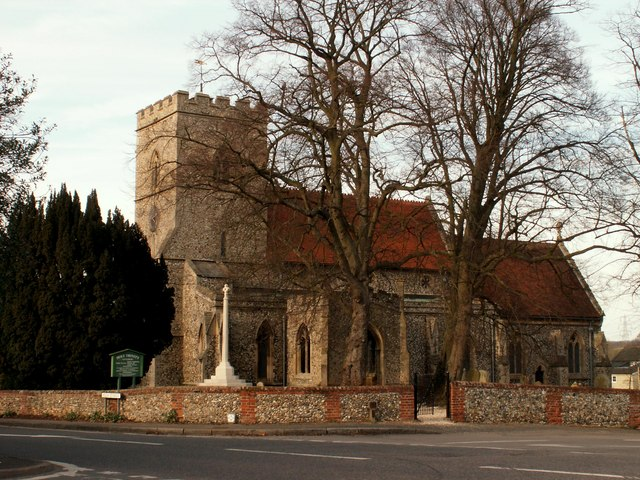
Holy Trinity church, Littlebury

The parish church of Holy Trinity was built on the site of a Roman camp. The first record of it dates from 1163 and the church was considerably altered between 1870 and 1874. It houses a beautiful stone font with decorated oak canopy.

St Peter's church at Littlebury Green was built in 1885. The village formerly supported a chapel, situated on Chapel Green, but no trace of it remains.

== Governance ==
An electoral ward in the same name exists. This ward stretches south to Arkesden with a total population at the 2011 census of 1,708.

== Amenities ==
The village has a pub, the Queen's Head, a fourteenth-century coaching inn.

== Notable people ==
- Joan Bradbury, widow of Thomas Bradbury who founded a school in the 17th century.
- Samuel Shaw, New Zealand labour reformer, born in Littlebury.
- Thomas Sutton, Master of the Ordnance in the North.
- The architect Henry Winstanley (1644–1703) was a resident of Littlebury. He was clerk of the King's works at Newmarket and Audley End under Charles II, and built the first Eddystone lighthouse. He died when it was washed away in a storm in 1703.

== See also ==
- The Hundred Parishes
- Listed buildings in Littlebury
