= Caythorpe, Nottinghamshire =

Village and civil parish in Nottinghamshire, England

Coordinates: 53.00°N 0.98°W

Caythorpe
- Village and civil parish
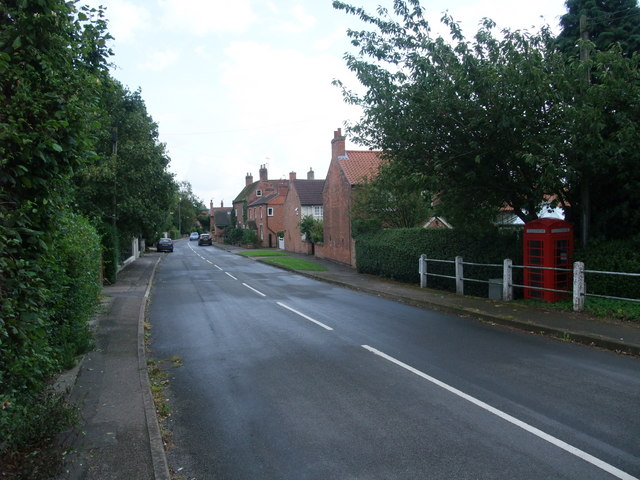
- Caythorpe's Main Street in 2008

- Location within Nottinghamshire
- Interactive map of Caythorpe
- Area: 0.59 sq mi (1.5 km^{2})
- Population: 257 (2021)
  - Density: 436/sq mi (168/km^{2})
- OS grid reference: SK 688455
  - London: 110 mi (180 km) SSE
- District: Newark and Sherwood
- Shire county: Nottinghamshire
- Region: East Midlands
- Country: England
- Sovereign state: United Kingdom
- Post town: NOTTINGHAM
- Postcode district: NG14
- Dialling code: 0115
- Police: Nottinghamshire
- Fire: Nottinghamshire
- Ambulance: East Midlands
- UK Parliament: Newark
- Website: Caythorpe parish council

Caythorpe is a village and civil parish in Nottinghamshire, England. It is situated 10 miles (16 km) north-east from Nottingham, close to the River Trent. According to the 2001 census, it had a population of 259, increasing to 271 at the time of the 2011 census, and dropping to 257 at the 2021 census.

The hamlet has a water mill dated 1749. A windmill stood in a field called Fairholme, later Woolf's Farm. This may be the mill referred to in an advertisement in the Nottingham Review of 1851: "Excellent Windmill containing two pair French Stones, dressing machine etc., cottage, stable, outbuildings, 7 to 8 acres land in occupation of Mr. Arnold." This mill is reputed to have been sold and transferred to Epperstone. A windmill site is shown on the First Series Ordnance Survey map (grid reference SK654458).

== See also ==
- Listed buildings in Caythorpe, Nottinghamshire
