= Bellman hangar =

Standard Air Ministry transportable hangar

The Bellman Hangar was designed in the United Kingdom in 1936 by the Directorate of Works structural engineer, N. S. Bellman, as a temporary aircraft hangar capable of being erected or dismantled by unskilled labour with simple equipment and to be easily transportable. Commercial manufacturing rights were acquired by Head Wrightson & Co of Teesdale Iron Works, Thornaby-on-Tees. By November 1938, 10 had even been supplied to Russia.

== Origins of transportable hangars ==
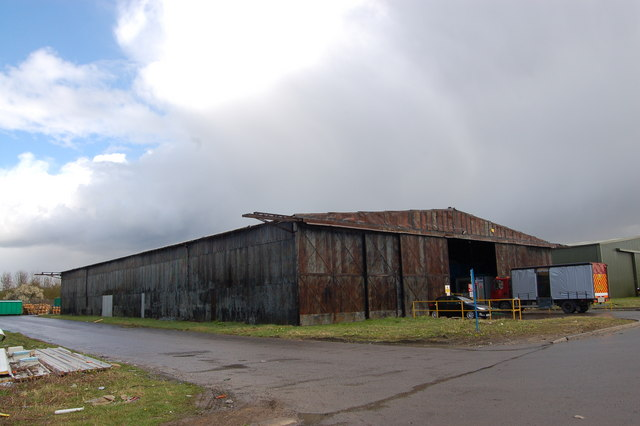
Bellman hangar at former RAF Stoke Orchard

During World War I and for some time after, the only successful transportable hangar design was the Bessonneau hangar. This could be very quickly erected and secured to provide adequate shelter for a few small aeroplanes. But with post-war increases in the number and size of aeroplanes, the need for larger transportable accommodation soon became apparent. The Air Ministry therefore issued a specification in 1936 covering the dimensions and requirements for a light transportable shed for use in war. It had to be end-opening with doors at both ends, be capable of mass production and have interchangeable parts to permit rapid erection and dismantling with minimal permanent foundations. This specification was submitted to various designers and eventually two different designs were presented - the Bellman and the Callender Hangar.

An example of each was erected at two demonstration sites (airfields) in the north-east: at RAF Thornaby an Air Ministry design was built (later to be known as the Bellman hangar) and at RAF Usworth a Callender Cable & Construction design was built (later to be known as the Callender-Hamilton hangar). In 1938, the Bellman design was chosen as the standard Air Ministry wartime transportable shed, but Callender-Hamilton hangars were also purchased in small numbers for Royal Naval Air Stations until superseded by a new hangar type in 1943.

== Construction ==
The Bellman hangar was designed in 1936 by N S Bellman (an Air Ministry Directorate of Works structural engineer) and its general dimensions were 175 ft long, 95 ft wide (87 ft 9in clear width) and 25 ft (clear height). It was constructed in 14 bays at 12 ft 6in centres based on a unit system of rolled steel sections; both walls and roof used the same standard units joined at the junction of wall and roof by a standard corner unit.

The time taken for 12 men to erect the hangar at Thornaby, including levelling the ground, laying door tracks, erecting the steelwork, and fitting oiled canvas doors, was 500 man-hours. Two light jib derricks using timber poles were required to erect the fabricated vertical and side members. The roof trusses were assembled on the ground before being lifted into position.

As a result of the bad winter of 1937 when a number of Bellman hangars at Thornaby were damaged after a heavy to severe fall of snow, production Bellmans were modified slightly to have steel-framed and steel-clad doors.

From 1938 to 1940 some 400 Bellman hangars were built in the UK, some 230 others were manufactured in Australia and probably more were produced under licence in other Commonwealth countries too. Pre-war examples are known to have been built at Brooklands (two for Hawker Aircraft Ltd were supplied by January 1939) and at Croydon Airport (one was provided there for Air Ministry use).

Bellmans proved to be invaluable in the early part of the war and met an increasing demand not only to supplement permanent hangars, but also to provide the total hangar requirements for many temporary Armament Training, Elementary Flying Training, and Air Navigation Schools.

Hangars were purchased in bulk and in 1938 a central parts storage depot was established at No. 3 MU at Milton, Oxfordshire. The parts for 40 Bellmans were stored in two specially built Bellman sheds for issue in the event of war. When all the hangars had been dispatched, these sheds were used for storing spare parts.

== Surviving examples in the UK ==
Today, there are believed to be about 100 Bellman hangars still in RAF/MoD service in the UK - including Chivenor, Cosford, St Athan and RNAS Yeovilton airfields.

Two examples are preserved in UK aircraft museums - one at AeroVenture near Doncaster, South Yorkshire and another at Brooklands Museum in Surrey. The latter has a clear height of 25 ft (required for dispersed production of Vickers Wellington and Warwick aircraft in World War II), was one of ten erected at Brooklands between 1938 and 1944 and became a designated Grade II Listed building in 1999. Currently the UK's only Listed example, it was the subject of a major restoration project supported by a major Heritage Lottery Fund grant, was dismantled in late 2016 then restored off-site before being re-erected in 2017 adjacent to its original location on part of the former Brooklands Race Track's Finishing Straight. Officially reopened to visitors as the Brooklands Aircraft Factory on 13 November 2017, it now houses a comprehensive new exhibition about the aircraft industry at Brooklands and related locations.

Others survive at UK civil airports/airfields such as Blackpool Airport, Booker (4), Detling (1), Fairwood Common (Swansea Airport) (1), Halfpenny Green (3), Southend Airport (1), Stoke Orchard (1) and White Waltham (2). Blackpool Airport Bellman hangar now houses the Spifire Visitors Centre a museum remembering the Battle of Britain. Further survivors can be found away from airfields in a variety of alternative uses.

Two Bellman hangars still stand at Daedalus Airfield, Lee-on-the-Solent. Both are in use; one storing gliders for Portsmouth Naval Gliding Club, while the other is used by Britten-Norman for client aircraft maintenance.

Four Bellman Hangars survive at Jurby Airfield, now disused, on the Isle of Man. One appropriately houses a Transport Museum.

There are nine Bellman hangars at No 101 Air Logistics Centre, Pakistan Air Force (PAF Base Faisal, Karachi in Pakistan). Before partition of the subcontinent, No 101 ALC, PAF, was No 1 MU India established in 1918 and later renamed N0 301 MU in 1942. Nine Bellman hangars were erected in 1945–46 and these are still in ALC use for storing aircraft stores.

== Bellman hangars in Australia ==
Bellmans were also produced in Australia from c. 1939 – c. 1945. They were often stated to have been made by Lysaght, but a history of Commonwealth Engineering reports that Waddington Engineering made over 200 Bellmans from a total of 283 ordered by the Air Ministry in Australia, but the steel within the structures is clearly marked as Lysaght suggesting the materials were sourced by Waddington from Lysaght, possibly explaining the conflicting stories. They were designed as easily transportable, temporary hangars which could be erected using unskilled labour and were used on war-time airfields constructed across Australia, particularly on training airfields.

Post-World War II, many were removed from temporary wartime airfields as they closed or downsized for civilian use and were relocated to expand or consolidate the permanent RAAF bases, or to establish new civilian airfields.

=== Australian Capital Territory ===
In the Australian Capital Territory, the following Bellman hangar survives:

- RAAF Base Fairbairn, now Canberra Airport; one remaining

=== New South Wales ===
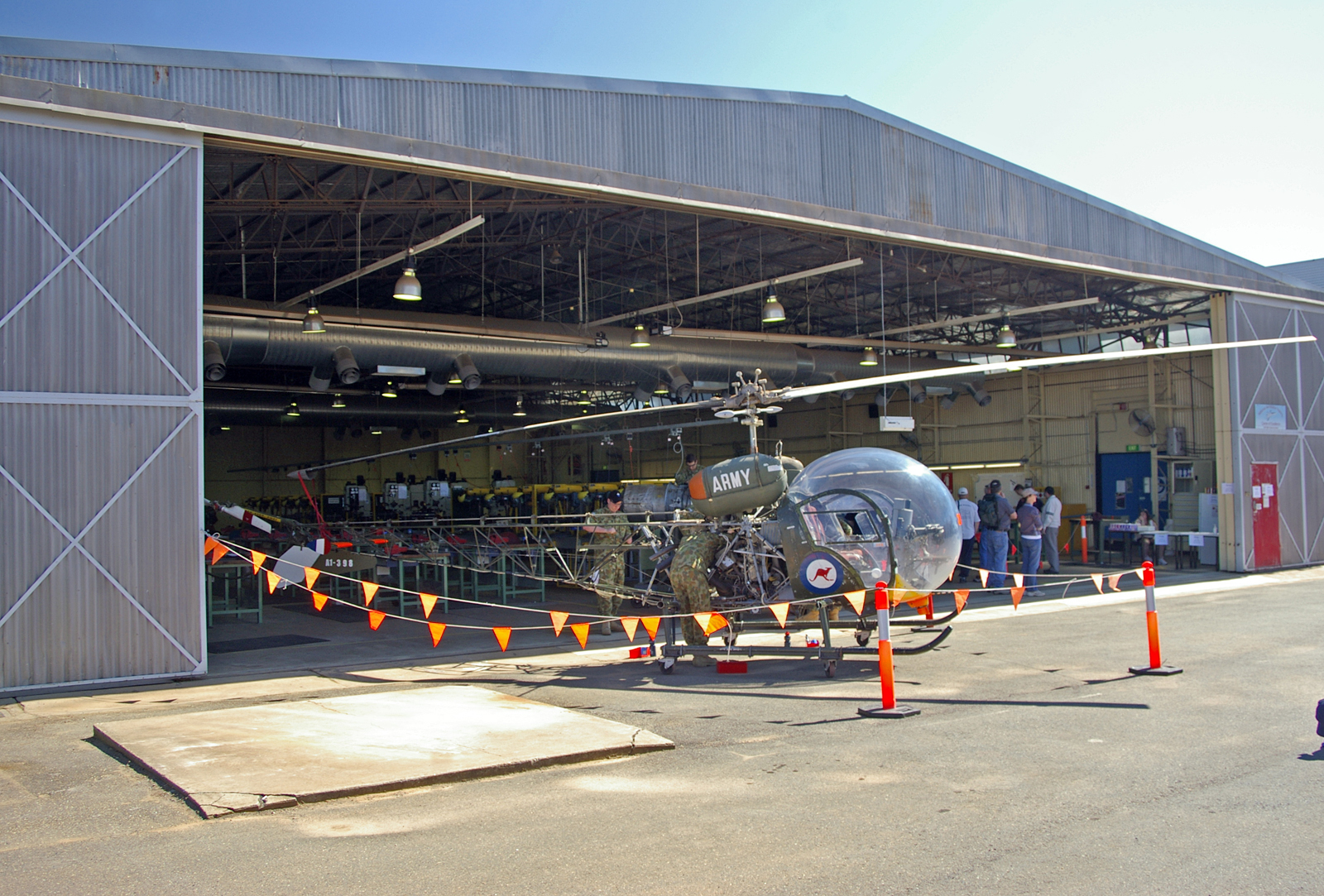
Bellman hangar at RAAF Base Wagga

In New South Wales, the following Bellman hangars survive:

- HMAS Albatross; four, believed erected when used by the RAAF in 1944
- Bathurst Airport; one re-erected in 2016; a second is stored there, dismantled
- Deniliquin Airport; four built as part of the WWII No.7 Service Flying Training School
- Dubbo, at the former RAAF No 6 Stores Depot Dubbo; two single and one double
- Evans Head Memorial Aerodrome; the last remaining example from an original 17 at this historic heritage-listed aerodrome and was recently restored as part of a NSW State Heritage-endorsed restoration project. The Bellman hangar is the home to the Evans Head Memorial Aerodrome Heritage Aviation Association. During World War II, this airfield was the largest air training facility in the Southern Hemisphere when home to the RAAF's No. 1 Bombing and Gunnery School and No. 1 Air Observers School (No. 1 BAGS and No. 1 AOS). 5,500 personnel trained on 109 separate RAAF courses held there. 1,100 of these lost their lives mainly when serving in Britain with Bomber Command on operations over occupied Europe and Germany. This represented a 23% attrition rate compared to the Australian national average during the conflict of 7%. The aerodrome is listed on the New South Wales State Heritage Register and this historic Hangar #156 was recently restored to house a former Royal Australian Air Force F-111 fighter jet (A8-147) in Australia's newest aviation museum which was officially opened on 25 August 2013.
- Narromine; two remaining from use by 5 EFTS and 618 Squadron RAF 1940–45; also one dismantled but apparently complete
- Temora Airport; one, occupied by the Temora Aero Club; built in 1940 for 10 EFTS
- Tocumwal Historical Aerodrome; one is owned by Tim Becroft of Tocumwal Aviation
- Tottenham (former RAAF stores); at least four, but may have been subsequently removed
- RAAF Base Wagga, in Forest Hill, in the Riverina district; fourteen remaining and believed to be the largest number of Bellman hangars surviving at one location

=== Queensland ===
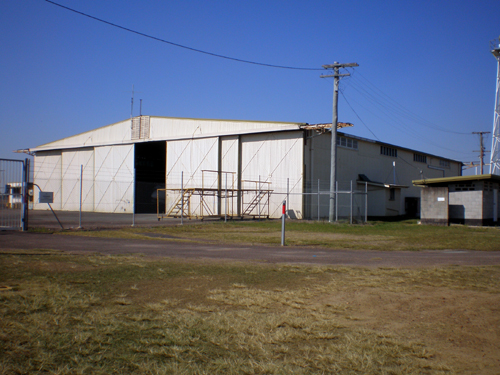
Maryborough, Queensland, 2008

In Queensland, the following Bellman hangars survive:

- Cairns Airport general aviation area; two remaining, one of which houses the North Queensland Aero Club and is in almost original condition; the other houses Skytrans and has been altered
- Mackay Airport; one, owned by Chrisair Maintenance
- near Charters Towers, at the Macrossan Stores Depot; three remaining
- Maryborough Airport; one remaining; two were relocated, one is located at Tarrants Pty Ltd and is used as a service centre for their garage, the other was extended and is located at the Maryborough sugar factory
- Army Aviation Centre, Oakey; one remaining
- Toowoomba; one, owned by the Darling Downs Aero Club
- RAAF Base Townsville; two remaining, both re-clad
- Jezzine Barracks, Townsville; one remaining

=== South Australia ===
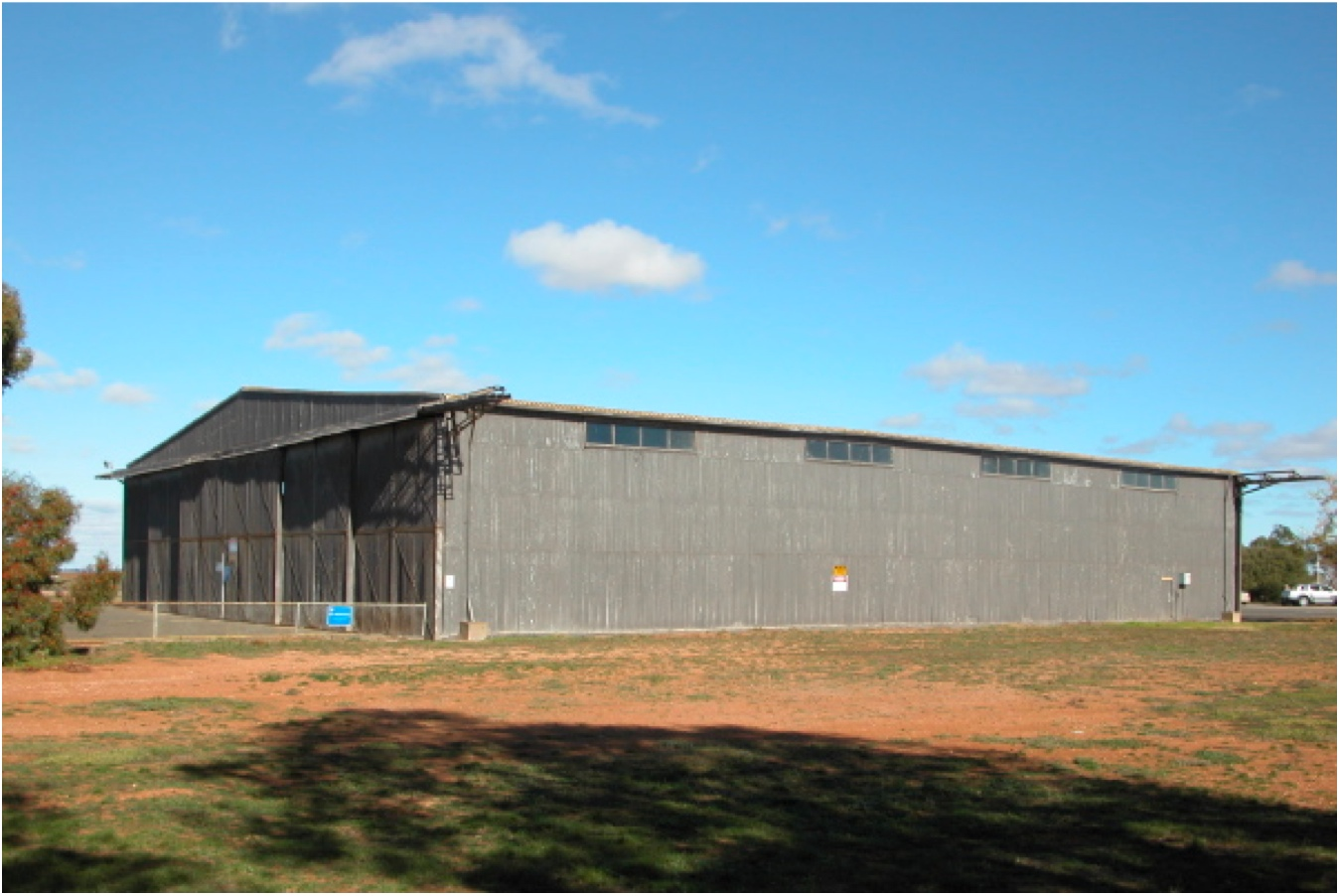
Port Pirie, South Australia, 2007

In South Australia, the following Bellman hangars survive:

- Mount Gambier Airport; one at the former No. 2 Air Observers School 1941–1946, subsequently re-clad
- Parafield Airport; three at the former No. 1 Elementary Flying Training School 1940–1944. Two have been re-clad, but one which houses the Classic Jets Fighter Museum is in original condition
- Port Pirie Airport; one at the former No. 2 Bombing and Gunnery School 1941–1943. It is in original condition
- Waikerie Airport; one used by the Waikerie Gliding Club

=== Victoria ===
In Victoria, the following Bellman hangars survive:

- Ballarat Airport; five at the former No. 1 Wireless Air Gunnery School under EATS (Empire Air Training Scheme), listed on the Victorian Heritage Register
- Benalla Airport; one at the former 11 Elementary Flying Training School under EATS
- Point Cook –
  - RAAF Williams
    - on the Southern Tarmac; four imported UK-manufactured examples, believed to be the only examples supplied from the UK surviving in Australia
    - on the Northern Tarmac; housing the RAAF Museum, ten Australian-built examples, listed on the National Heritage List
  - RAAF Laverton
    - five listed on the Commonwealth Heritage List of RAAF Williams
    - a further two, adjacent to the road next to the railway, on land excised from the site
- RAAF Base East Sale, now the Central Flying School; twelve when it was the former No. 1 Operational Training Unit under EATS
- Essendon Airport; two, possibly relating to either DAP aircraft manufacturing or the EFTS operating on the site during World War II
- Fishermans Bend; three at the site of the Commonwealth Aircraft Corporation factory, dismantled in c. 2003 – c. 2004
- Moorabbin Airport; thirteen that were moved from elsewhere when that civilian airfield was created post-WWII
- Mildura Airport; one at the former No. 2 Operational Training Unit
- Nhill Airport; one at the former No. 2 Air Navigator School under EATS
- West Sale Airport; one

=== Outside Australia ===
The following hangar, originally located in Australia, survive outside Australia:

- Vung Tau Air Base, Vietnam; dismantled and transported from Parkes, New South Wales; one was set up by No. 5 Airfield Construction Squadron (5ACS) during the Vietnam War and may still exist; three remain at Parkes

== See also ==
- B hut
- Dymaxion deployment unit
- Iris hut
- Quonset hut
- Romney hut
- Rubb hall
- Tin tabernacle, prefabricated churches made from corrugated galvanised steel
- Patera Building
