= Dymaxion deployment unit =

Structure designed by Buckminster Fuller

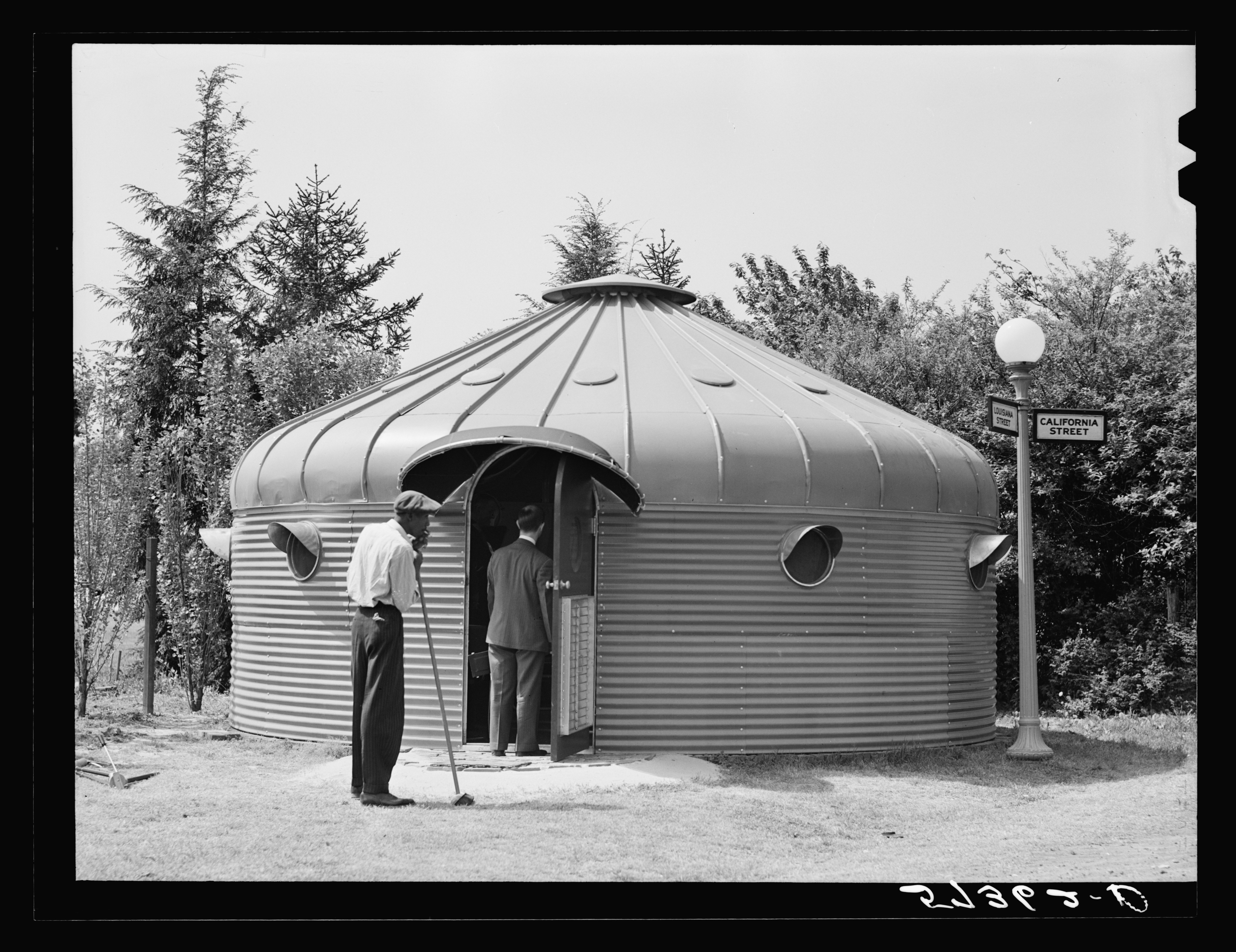
Dymaxion House

A Dymaxion deployment unit (DDU) or Dymaxion House, is a structure designed in 1940 by Buckminster Fuller consisting of a 20-foot circular hut constructed of corrugated steel looking much like a yurt or the top of a metal silo. The interior was insulated and finished with wallboard, portholes and a door. The dome-like ceiling has a hole in the top and a cap for ventilation.

Dymaxion House – structure

== History ==
The Army Signal Corps commissioned Fuller in 1942 to develop 200 units as quickly as possible. The units were manufactured by the Butler Manufacturing company and were deployed all around the world prior to the US entry into World War II. The cost of each unit at the time was $1,250. The wartime shortage of steel resulted in the cancellation of further production.

The Infoage Science/History Learning Center (the NJ science center at Camp Evans) has 11 surviving DDUs as seen in current satellite photos. Historical aerial photos show at least 14 between the two large H-shaped buildings for a total of over 24 units at the base from 1947 to 1970. Many of the cement pads remain after the DDU was removed. They were used for storage of hazardous materials and for small shops.

== See also ==
- Nissen hut
- B hut
- Iris hut
- Quonset hut
- Romney hut
- Rubb hall
- Patera Building
