= Fordham's Accommodation =

Coordinates: 36°08′34″N 5°20′53″W

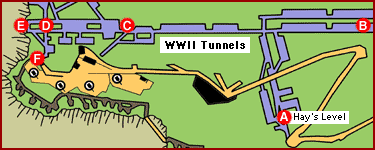
- A Hay's Level B Fordham's Accommodation C Tunnelling Memorial D Clapham Junction E Jocks Balcony F Exit to surface
- Interactive map of Fordham's Accommodation

Overview
- Location: Gibraltar

Operation
- Constructed: limestone
- Owner: Government of Gibraltar

Fordham's Accommodation are underground parallel chambers within the Rock of Gibraltar built during the Second World War. These are part of the extensive tunnels of Gibraltar. The chambers were named after Colonel H M Fordham OBE, MC, who was chief engineer in Gibraltar. The chambers were based on Liddell's Union Tunnel.

== Description ==
The tunnel is named after Colonel H M Fordham OBE, MC, who was the chief engineer in Gibraltar from 1940 to 1941. The chambers were constructed by enlarging the original Liddell's Union Tunnel which extends southward to the Calpe Hospital chambers which were used by both civilian and military patients. Although at this point only essential civilians were allowed in Gibraltar with the rest having been evacuated.

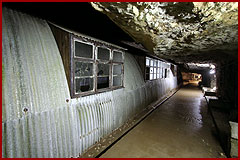
A Nissen hut in Fordham's Accommodation

The purpose of the World War II tunnelling project in Gibraltar was to provide sufficient accommodation to enable a garrison of 16,000 to live underground and resist a siege for a period of up to a year. Therefore, the accommodation had to include a water supply, electric light and power, sanitary arrangements, hospital and laundry in addition to the normal accommodation of personnel. The overall accommodation capacity in this section of tunnels was 6,000.

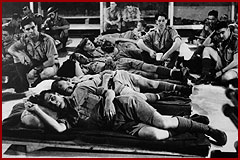
Sleeping was 200 to a Nissen hut on a three shift basis

Chambers allowed the construction of buildings which were either standard army huts (typically Nissen huts, Iris huts or Romney huts) or buildings made of concrete block walls and normal roof trusses. The buildings protected people from annoying drips and the occasional fall of small rocks. Frosted glass windows helped the occupants feel a sense of normality despite being deep underground.

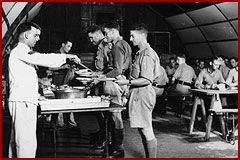
Eating inside Fordham's Accommodation

In all chambers two feet of clear air space all round the building was allowed. This space was essential so that water seeping through the rock could drain away through the drainage channels provided; it also permitted air circulation around the buildings, and facilitated periodic inspection of the rock face.

Every chamber having a span of more than 12 feet (3.7 m) was arched, the rise being one fifth of the span. In the early days. spans up to 35 feet (11 m) had been cut with flat roofs, but these gave endless trouble from rock falls, particularly when further excavations were being carried out in the vicinity. One of the largest chambers, 380 feet (120 m) long by 50 feet (15 m) span, was given an 11 feet (3.4 m) rise of arch and was very successful.

In planning economically, the aim was to reduce the access tunnelling to the minimum. Chambers leading directly off the main tunnel, were generally used, with a passing bay provided to avoid congestion or, even better, with a service tunnel. These tunnels were excavated using diamond drills and gelignite. The drill holes were placed over two metres apart armed with a pound of gelignite per metre depth of drilled hole. The blasts were able to reach a free face over 2 metres (6 ft 7 in) and sometimes up to 4.5 metres (15 ft) away. This was a fast way of tunnelling but in retrospect it may have used too much explosive as the remaining rock around tunnels of this era are unstable and rock falls have killed people.

The chambers were generally 28 feet (8.5 m) to 40 feet (12 m) span, and 150 feet (46 m) to 200 feet (61 m) long, and in every case were connected at their ends by a small section tunnel called a 'back drive'. These joining tunnels prevented the chambers from becoming damp and unusable as these connections were essential to allow for the circulation of air assisting in keeping the chambers well ventilated.

Chambers were also cut parallel to the main tunnel. A pillar of rock 20 feet (6.1 m) to 30 feet (9.1 m) wide was allowed between each chamber and, where one system was being developed above another, a clear rock space of 100 feet (30 m) between the two systems was considered the minimum safe thickness. Small communication tunnels, however, up to 12 feet (3.7 m) span, were crossed with only 18 feet (5.5 m) between the roof of the lower tunnel and the floor of the higher. The tunnel design had to be prepared carefully and tunnels were included even though the plan for their use was unclear. This was because it was difficult to add extensions, because the subsequent blasting would have damaged the completed chambers and their fittings.
