= Romney hut =

Prefabricated steel structure developed by the British military in WWII

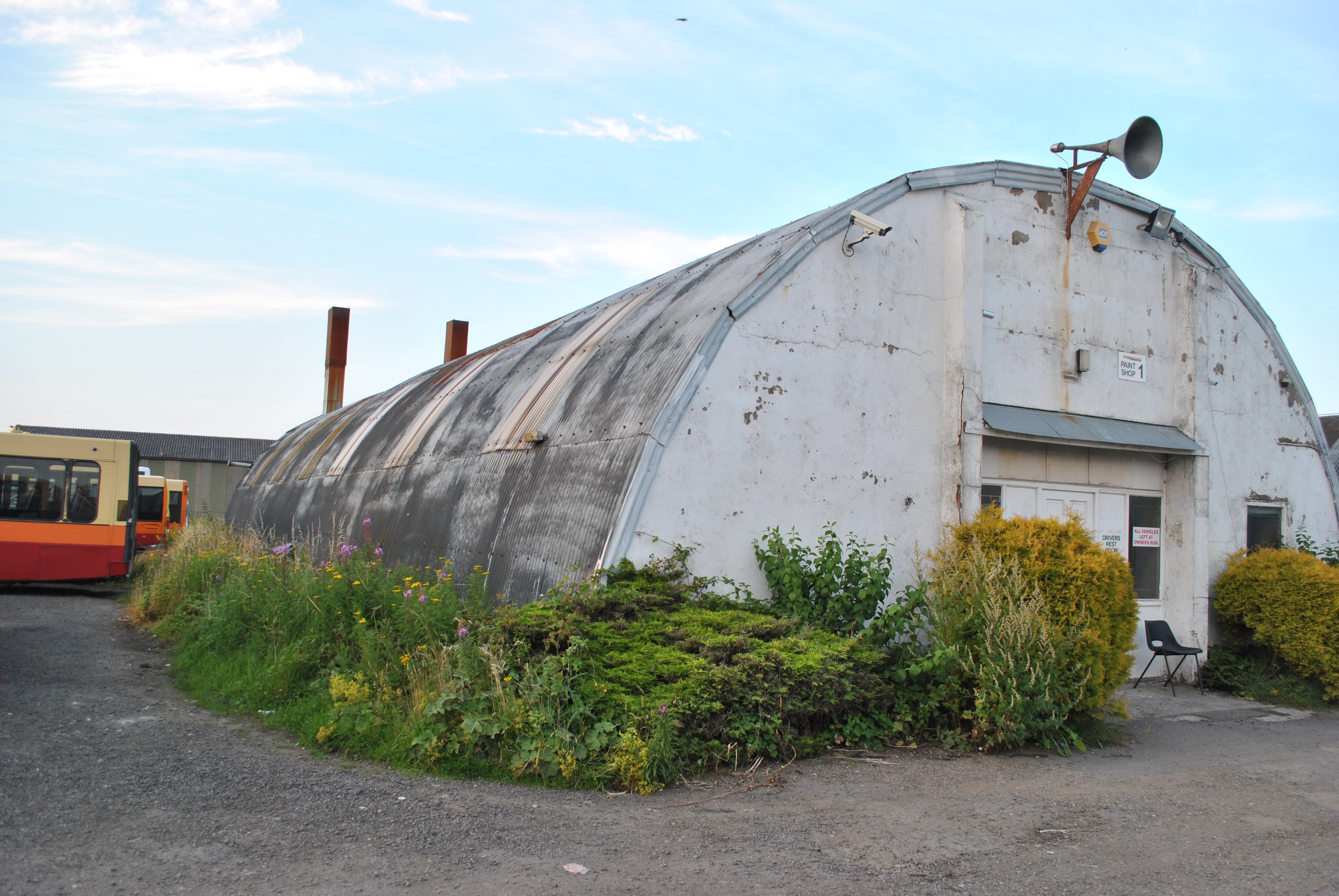
Romney hut at the former RAF Tholthorpe (2012).

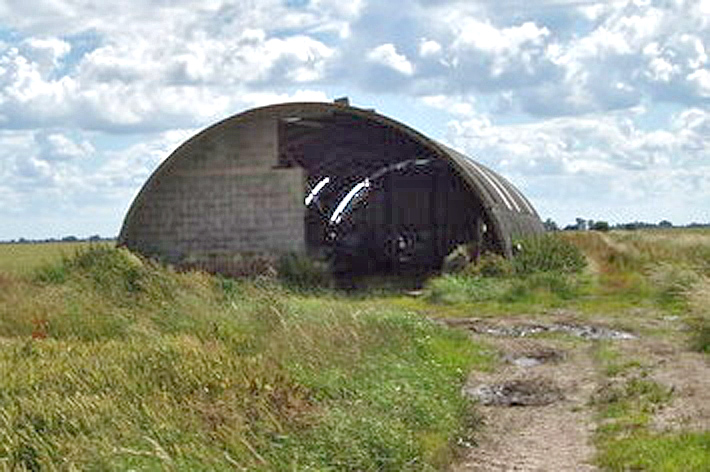
Romney hut near Eastoft, Lincolnshire, July 2007

The Romney hut is a prefabricated steel structure used by the British military, developed during World War II to supersede the Iris hut.

== History ==
At the outbreak of World War II, the British military developed a series of prefabricated huts to supplement the World-War-I-era Nissen hut. The Iris hut was one of these, a medium-scale hut of 35 feet (11 m) span and from 60 feet (18 m) to 96 feet (29 m) in length, with bays of 4 feet (1.2 m) sectional length able to be added as required. However, the Iris hut had a major design flaw: it was unable to resist the weight of snow lying on the roof and had a tendency to collapse after snowfalls. For this reason, it was superseded by the Romney hut by 1941.

Both the Iris hut and the Romney hut were constructed of a clamped tubular steel frame with a central entrance. The hut was used to accommodate facilities for which abnormal roof spans were required. On some airfields, two or more Romney or Iris huts would be erected to accommodate large stores and workshops, or occasionally used as aircraft hangars.

It was invented by Lt Col Edgar Frank Brawn of the Royal Engineers.

== See also ==
- B hut
- Dymaxion deployment unit
- Nissen hut
- Quonset hut
- Rubb hall
- Tin tabernacle, prefabricated churches made from corrugated galvanised steel
- Patera Building
- List of British military equipment of World War II
