= Iris hut =

Prefabricated steel structure developed by the British military

The Iris hut is a prefabricated steel structure used by the British military predominantly during the early part of the Second World War. They served as barracks, workshops, and storage facilities in World War II Great Britain.

Iris huts were also used as accommodation in the tunnels of Gibraltar, where they were situated in chambers excavated under the Rock of Gibraltar.

== Architecture ==
An Iris hut is constructed of a clamped tubular steel frame with a central entrance.

The hut's mode of construction and dimensions are similar to those of the Romney hut, as was its purpose. Both were used to accommodate facilities for which abnormal roof spans were required. On some airfields, two or more Romney or Iris huts would be erected to accommodate large stores and workshops. However, the Iris hut had a major design flaw: it was unable to resist the weight of snow lying on the roof and had a tendency to collapse after snowfalls. For this reason, it was superseded by the Romney hut by 1941.

== Present day ==
Surviving Iris huts are now rare due to their fragility.

=== Bicester ===
Six original examples (along with six Romney huts) are still located at the Central Ordnance Depot Bicester, part of the British Ministry of Defence's Logistic Services Bicester facility. The Bicester huts were completed by July 1944, by which time the design had been almost entirely phased out elsewhere. They were needed in connection with Operation Bolero, the build-up of U.S. forces in Britain for the campaign in Europe, which aimed to accommodate 1,446,000 U.S. service personnel on British soil by 30 April 1944. It resulted in "the greatest expansion of military infrastructure ever to occur in British history." The troops were accommodated in 16-foot (4.9 m) wide Nissen huts and their stores and workshops in 35-foot (11 m) wide Iris huts, manufactured in Britain from billet steel imported from the United States.

The huts at Bicester became surplus to requirements following the withdrawal of the bulk of the U.S. forces in early 1946 and most were demolished during the 1960s. It is unclear what the Iris huts were used for, but the presence of ventilated panels suggests that they were used to store flammable goods.

== See also ==
- Quonset hut
- B hut
- Dymaxion deployment unit
- Italian Chapel, constructed from two Nissen huts by Italian prisoners of war on Lamb Holm, Orkney Islands
- Romney hut
- Rubb hall
- Tin tabernacle, prefabricated churches made from corrugated galvanised steel
- Patera Building
