= Tunnels of Gibraltar =

Tunnels constructed between 1782 and 1968

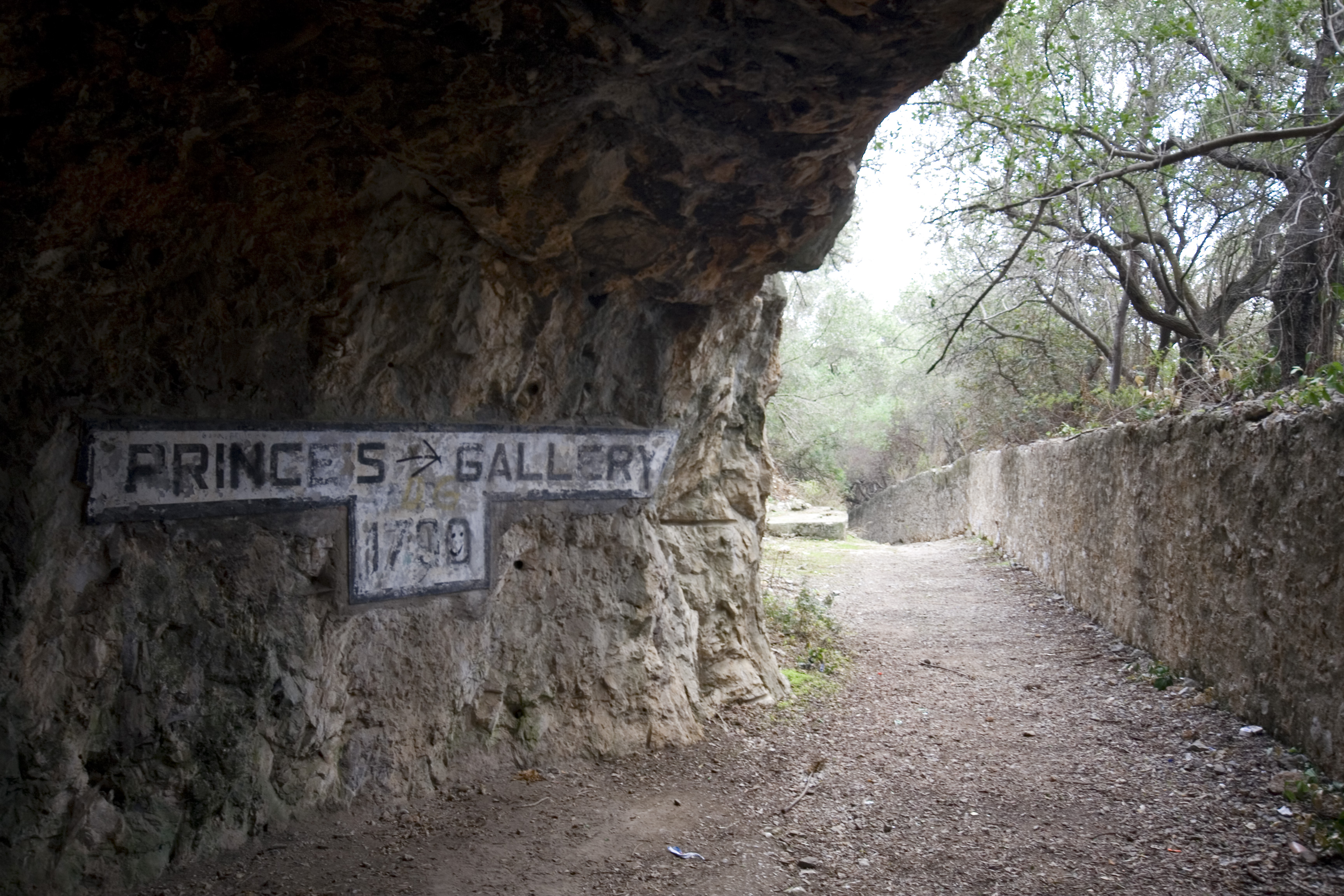
Entrance to the Prince's Gallery, excavated in 1790

The tunnels of Gibraltar were constructed over the course of nearly 200 years, principally by the British Army. Within a land area of only 2.6 square miles (6.7 km^{2}), Gibraltar has around 34 miles (55 km) of tunnels, nearly twice the length of its entire road network. The first tunnels, excavated in the late 18th century, served as communication passages between artillery positions and housed guns within embrasures cut into the North Face of the Rock. More tunnels were constructed in the 19th century to allow easier access to remote areas of Gibraltar and accommodate stores and reservoirs to deliver the water supply of Gibraltar.

The 20th century saw by far the greatest extent of tunnelling when the Rock was turned into a huge underground fortress capable of accommodating 16,000 men along with all the supplies, ammunition and equipment needed to withstand a prolonged siege. The tunnelling finally ceased in 1968 when the British Army's last specialist tunnelling unit was disbanded. Since then, the tunnels have progressively been turned over to the civilian Government of Gibraltar, although a number are still owned by the Ministry of Defence and some have been sealed off entirely as they are now too dangerous to enter.

== Geology of Gibraltar ==
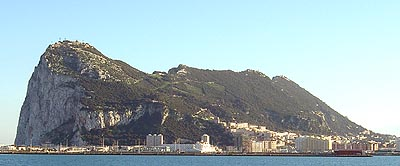
The Rock of Gibraltar viewed from the north-west

The Rock of Gibraltar is a klippe of Jurassic dolomitic limestone with series of 'shale' formations underlying and in part overlaying the limestone. It consists primarily of a series of carbonate deposits some 400 to 600 metres (1,300 to 2,000 ft) thick, varying from dark grey bituminous dolomite at the base through to a very thick, apparently homogeneous sequence of light or medium grey fine-grained limestones. The formation appears to have been laid down in a tropical environment somewhat similar to the Bahamas today, and on the basis of fossil evidence an Early Jurassic (Sinemurian) age has been proposed for the Gibraltar Limestone, though in appearance it has a strong resemblance to the Carboniferous Limestone that underlies large parts of England and Wales.

The formation's thick bedding, extensive cementation and dolomitisation have made it a generally stable engineering material. Tunnelling has been possible almost throughout the Rock, with the exception of one region where it has been precluded due to high ground water pressures. In some areas, zones of weak rock or intrusions of the underlying or overlying 'shales' have caused tunnel instability.

== Phases of development ==
The tunnels of Gibraltar were constructed between 1782 and 1968, in five distinct phases.

=== 1782–99 ===
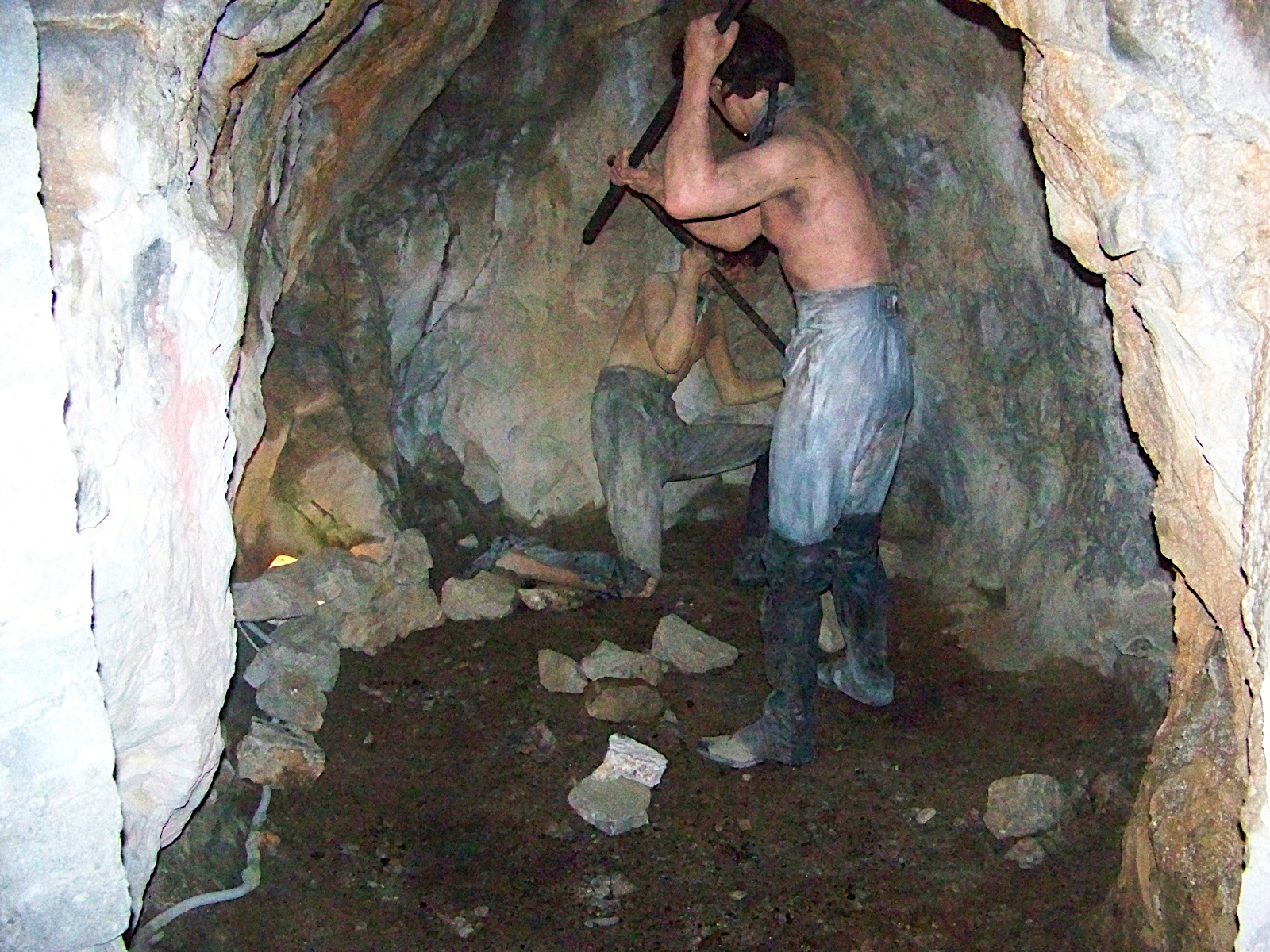
Reconstruction showing members of the Soldier Artificer Company digging the Upper Gallery

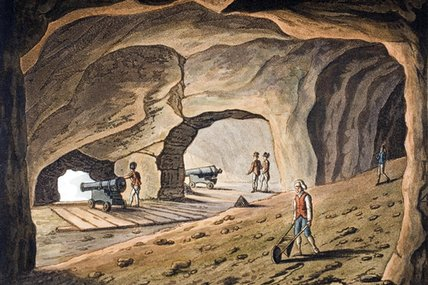
Inside a gallery on the Rock of Gibraltar, engraved by I.C. Stadler after Rev C. Willyams (c. 1800)

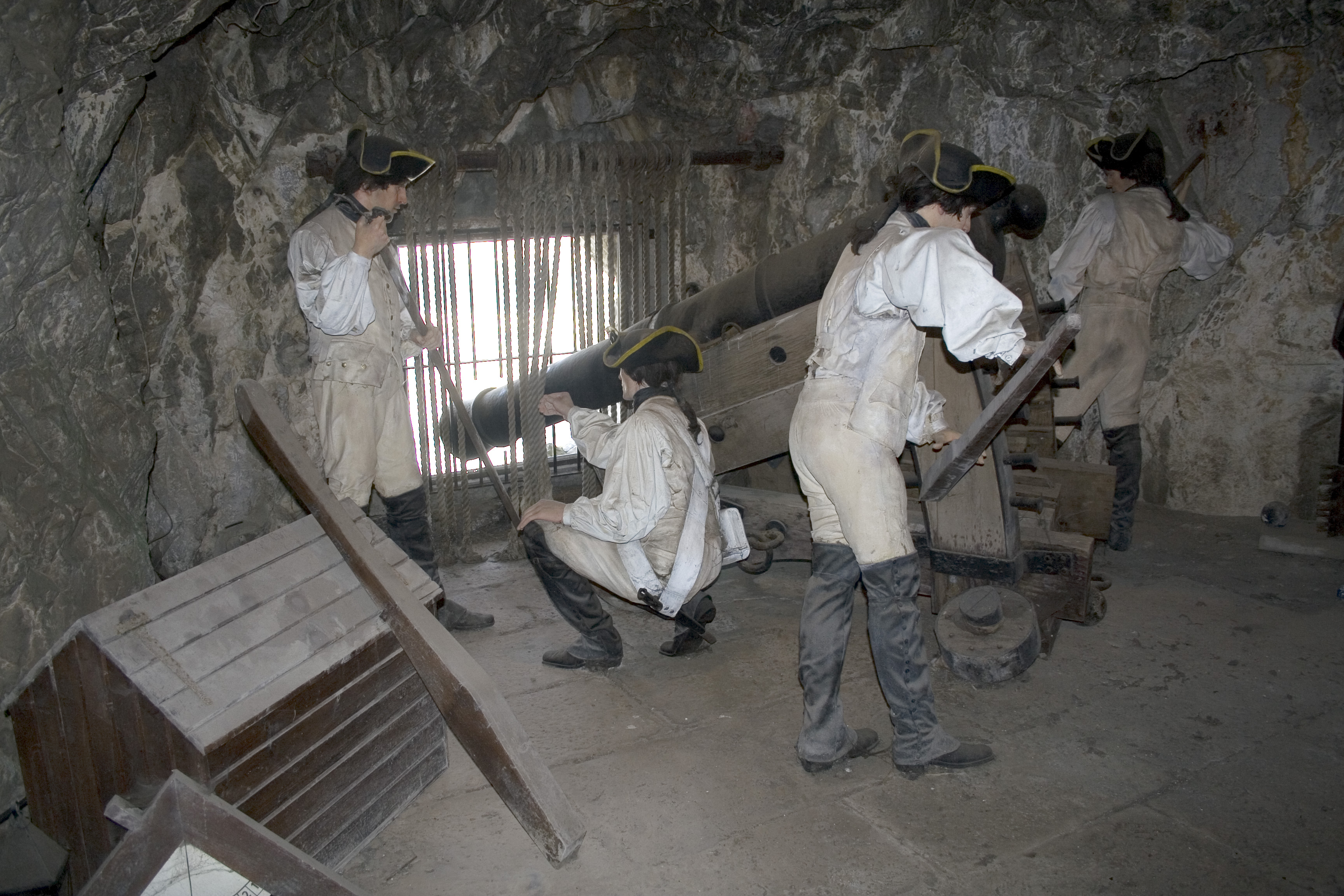
Reconstruction in the Great Siege Tunnels of British gunners using a cannon mounted on a Koehler Depressing Carriage

After the capture of Gibraltar in 1704, the British began constructing fortified defensive lines on the north-west flank of the Rock of Gibraltar – the King's Lines, Queen's Lines and Prince's Lines. These consisted of trenches cut into the solid rock or natural ledges which were made more defensible by building masonry walls and scarping the cliffs below. The Lines were constructed in stages, building on earlier defences constructed by the Moors and Spanish; the King's Lines reused Spanish defensive walls built prior to 1704, the Prince's Lines were excavated between then and the Thirteenth Siege of Gibraltar in 1727 and the Queen's Lines were constructed during the Great Siege of Gibraltar (1779–83).

The first man-made tunnels in Gibraltar were created during the Great Siege when members of the British Army's Soldier Artificer Company dug out a tunnel behind the North Face of the Rock. It was intended to reach a position called the Notch, which was inaccessible by any other route, where the British garrison sought to install a new artillery battery to cover a blind angle. The tunnel was the initiative of the company's Sergeant-Major, Henry Ince, who began the task on 25 May 1782. As the works progressed, the tunnellers decided to create an opening in the cliff face to provide them with ventilation. It was immediately realised that this would offer an excellent firing position. By the end of the siege, the newly created Upper Gallery housed four guns, mounted on specially developed "depressing carriages" to allow them to fire downwards into Spanish positions on the isthmus to the north. The Notch was not reached until after the siege had ended; instead of mounting a gun above it, the outcrop was hollowed out to create a broad firing position called St George's Hall.

The tunnelling continued after the siege to build a series of connecting galleries and communication tunnels to link them together with the Lines. By the end of the 18th century, nearly 4,000 feet (1,200 m) of tunnels had been dug. These comprised:

- Windsor Gallery – 659 feet (201 m)
- Queen's Union Gallery – 304 feet (93 m)
- Upper Union Gallery – 437 feet (133 m)
- Lower Union Gallery – 232 feet (71 m)
- Prince's Gallery – 220 feet (67 m)
- King's Gallery – 710 feet (220 m)
- Queen's Gallery – 1,079 feet (329 m)

=== 1880–1915 ===
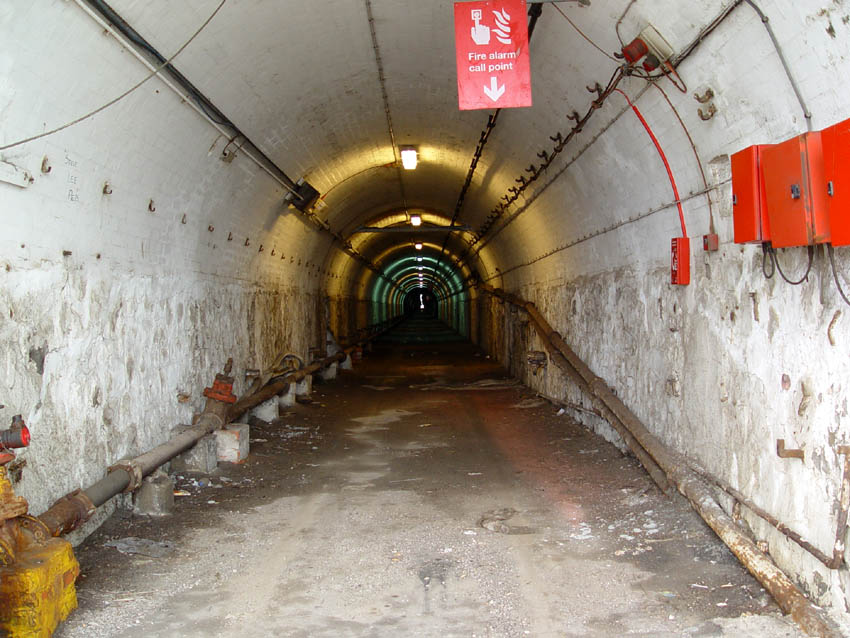
The Admiralty Tunnel

The second phase of tunnelling was driven by a number of disparate requirements towards the end of the 19th century as Gibraltar's naval base became a key strategic asset for the United Kingdom. Two short tunnels were constructed in Camp Bay on the southwest end of Gibraltar in 1880 to provide access to a quarry. In 1895, the Army dug out two natural caves under Windmill Hill to create an underground ammunition store, the Beefsteak Magazine.

Major new construction works in the harbour at the end of the century prompted the Admiralty to construct the Dockyard Tunnel between 1898 and 1899, driving through the entire width of the Rock in an east–west direction to reach Sandy Bay on the east side, where quarries were being worked to provide stone for the construction of the dry docks. In 1901, the Admiralty followed up by extending the natural Ragged Staff Cave to form a tunnelled underground magazine adjoining the harbour. Gibraltar's long-running water supply problems were tackled between 1898 and 1900 with the construction of four underground reservoirs. They were supplied with rainwater gathered from catchment areas on the Great Sand Dune on the east side of the Rock and conveyed to the reservoirs by a new east–west tunnel. A fifth reservoir was constructed between 1911 and 1915.

=== 1933–38 ===
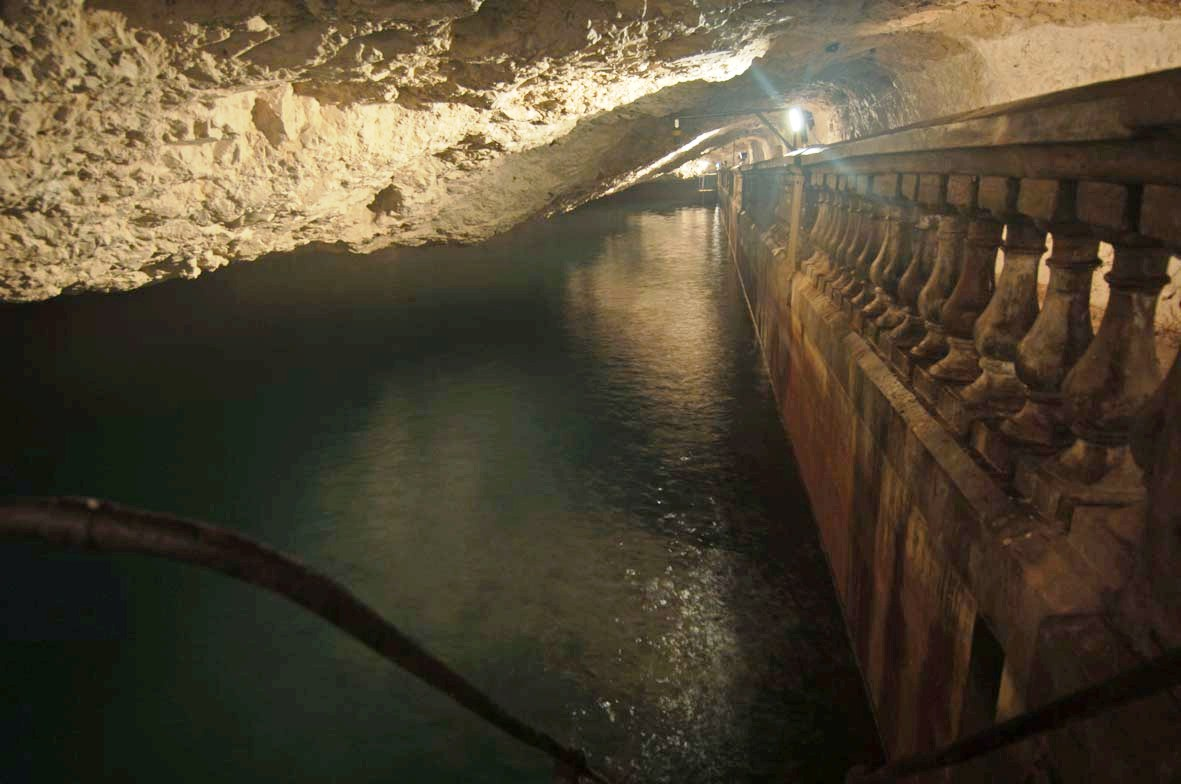
One of the reservoirs constructed inside the Rock of Gibraltar

The third phase of tunnelling was prompted by the rise of Nazi Germany and the outbreak of the Spanish Civil War. Air-raid shelters and underground hospitals were constructed from 1936, while improvements to Gibraltar's water supply were made between 1933 and 1938 with the construction of four new underground reservoirs. An additional reservoir was begun but was used, in its incomplete state, as a storehouse and barracks for 4th Battalion the Black Watch during the Second World War. The improvements made during this phase increased the total length of the tunnels from 5 miles (8.0 km) to 7 miles (11 km).

=== 1939–45 ===
The most intensive phase of tunnelling in Gibraltar's history came during the Second World War, when the territory played a vital role in the North Atlantic and Mediterranean theatres. The total length of the tunnels increased greatly during the war, from 7 miles (11 km) to 25 miles (40 km).

At the start of the war, the civilian population was evacuated and the garrison was greatly increased in size. Numerous new tunnels were excavated to create accommodation for the expanded garrison and to store huge quantities of food, equipment and ammunition. The tunnelling was carried out by four specialised tunnelling companies from the Royal Engineers and the Canadian Army. A new Main Base Area was established in the south-eastern part of Gibraltar on the peninsula's Mediterranean coast, shielded from the potentially hostile Spanish mainland, and new connecting tunnels were created to link this with the established military bases on the west side. A pair of tunnels, the Great North Road and the Foss Way, were excavated running nearly the full length of the Rock to interconnect the bulk of the wartime tunnels.

The tunnels accommodated what amounted to an underground city. The entire 16,000-strong garrison could be housed there along with enough food to last them for 16 months. Within the tunnels there were also an underground telephone exchange, a power generating station, a water distillation plant, a hospital, a bakery, ammunition magazines and a vehicle maintenance workshop. They also housed one of Gibraltar's most secret places – Stay Behind Cave, built for Operation Tracer, a plan to maintain a secret observation post manned by six men within the Rock if it had fallen to a German invasion. It was not rediscovered until as recently as 1997.

Among the major tunnels and systems built during the Second World War were:

- AROW Street
- Beefsteak Magazine
- Brewery Magazine
- Calpe Hospital
- Flat Bastion Hospital
- Fordham's Accommodation
- Fosse Way Magazine
- Gort's Hospital
- Great North Road
- Green Lane Magazine
- Harley Street
- Levant Accommodation
- Liddell Union
- Maida Vale
- MacFarlane's Gallery
- Power's Drive
- REME Chambers
- Upper Sandy System
- Williams Way

=== 1956–68 ===
The final phase of tunnelling took place during the Cold War to meet a number of new military and civilian requirements. Storage facilities were constructed under the Rock to hold bulk fuel, and two more reservoirs were also constructed. Several more connecting tunnels were excavated to improve road access across the south of Gibraltar. The final tunnel, Molesend Way, was completed by 1967. Tunnelling ceased for good in April 1968 and the last Tunnelling Troop was disbanded and its members dispersed to other units.

Unfortunately during the construction of this tunnel the last Royal Engineer to be killed digging tunnels in Gibraltar died during an accidental explosion. Bill Pointon was working with Harry Calligan on the tunnel face when they drilled into a pill of powder that had not been "fired" in the previous shift. Calligan was badly injured but Pointon died of his injuries. When the tunnel was completed the Squadron, following a long established convention, wanted the tunnel named Pointon's Way. That was not accepted and the tunnel was instead named Molesend Way.

== Excavation methods ==
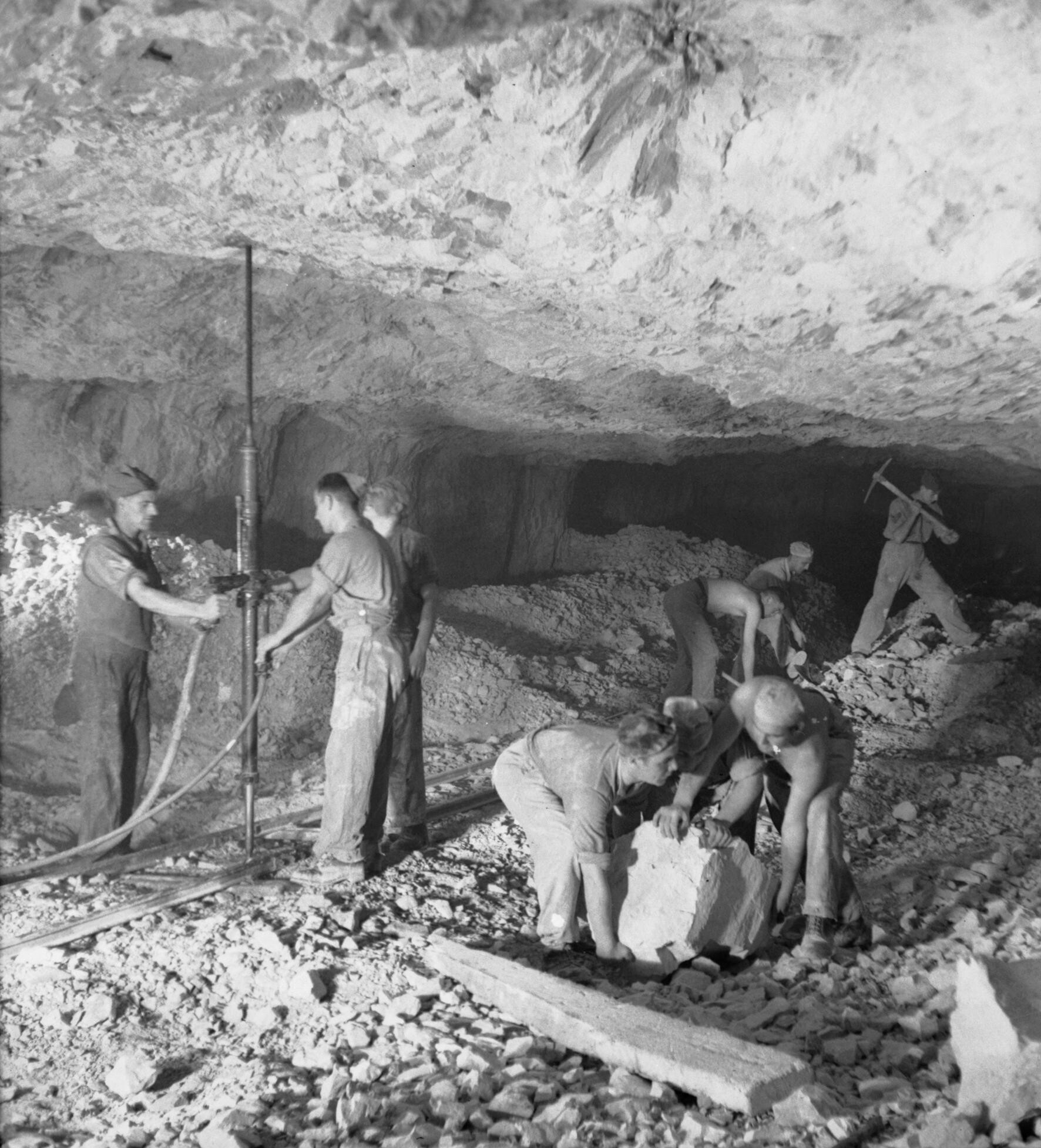
Royal Engineer tunnellers using a water pressure drill to clear solid rock inside the Rock of Gibraltar, 1 November 1941

Gibraltar's first tunnels were constructed by hand in a slow, laborious but durable method of excavation. The first task was to fragment the limestone rock. This was done by using a variety of methods, including gunpowder blasting, fire setting (building a fire against the face of the rock to heat it, then quenching it with cold water to cause it to shatter), quicklime (used to fill boreholes which were then slaked with water, causing it to expand and so shattering the surrounding rock) and hammering in wooden wedges which were expanded by soaking them with water, again causing the rock to shatter. The fragments were then removed with crowbars and sledgehammers.

The tunnels thus created were about 2 metres (6 ft 7 in) to 3 metres (9.8 ft) in diameter with smooth-sided walls. Excavation was slow, at a rate of only about 200 metres (660 ft) per year, but the methods used by the original tunnellers had the advantage of causing only minimal damage to the surrounding rock. This has resulted in very stable tunnels which are still readily accessible today.

The later tunnels were constructed at a far faster speed using explosives and machinery. By 1942, the tunnelling had reached a peak rate of advance of 60 metres (200 ft) of tunnel per week. However, the use of explosives produced large quantities of high-pressure gas which penetrated the surrounding rock and weakened it, and it appears that too much explosive may have been used. This has led to the surrounding rock fragmenting on a large scale, causing the Second World War tunnels to suffer from fracturing requiring them to be scaled periodically to clear away loose rock. Some of the tunnels have had to be sealed permanently as they are now too unsafe to enter. Others have needed to be supported by rock bolts, weld mesh, props, arches or tunnel linings, and their integrity is monitored by carrying out scanline surveys.

The principal tunnelling method used during the war was the blast-hole diamond drilling technique, which had only recently been developed. It involved either undercutting the tunnel and bringing down the back using diamond drill blasting – detonating gelignite charges in drill holes spaced between 2.1 metres (6 ft 11 in) to 2.4 metres (7 ft 10 in) apart – or excavating the central portion of the tunnel to its full height and diamond drill blasting the sides. The resulting rubble was used to extend the airfield at RAF North Front out into the Bay of Gibraltar.

Post-war tunnelling took place in less urgent circumstances and new, less damaging, tunnelling methods were used. Explosives were employed again but this time in smaller quantities, placed in drill holes bored into the face of the excavation. They were fired electrically in a sequence which began in the centre of the face and spread outwards, so that the centre would create a void into which the peripheral rock could fall. The downside of this method was that it created tunnels with jagged sides, as it fractured the limestone around the periphery of the excavation.

== Design and fitting out ==
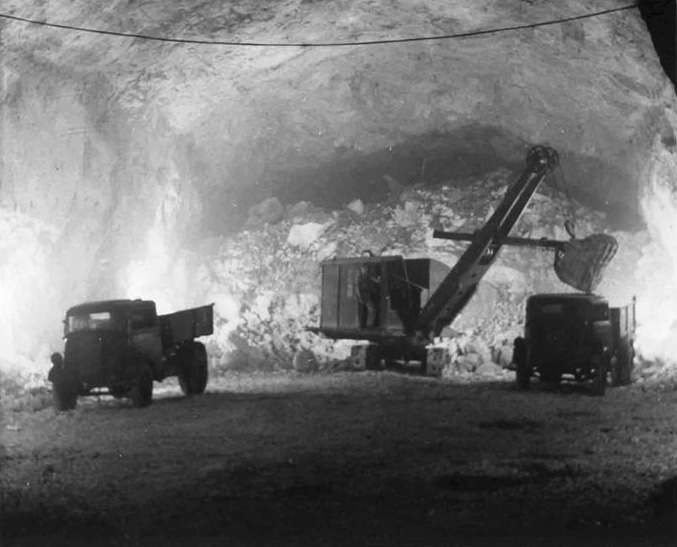
Excavation of the cavernous REME factory chamber, 1941

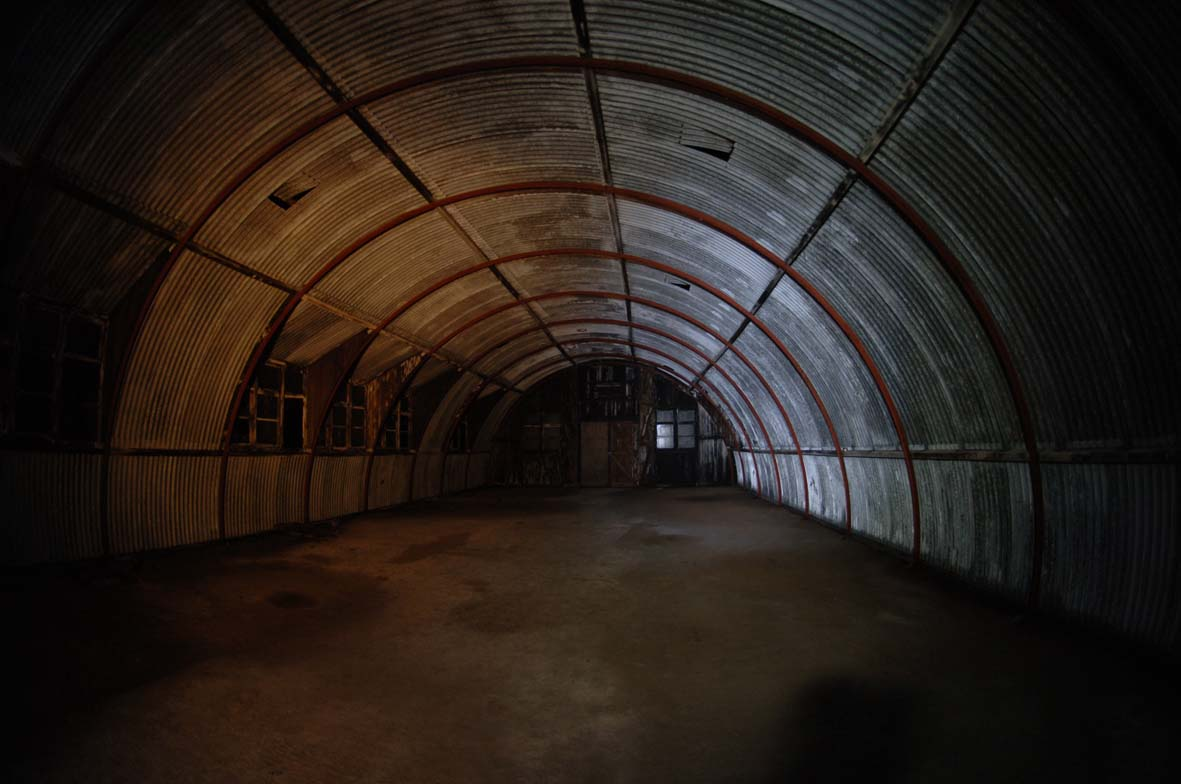
A surviving Nissen hut inside the tunnels

Whereas the early tunnels were simple man-sized holes, the later ones – especially those excavated during the Second World War – were much more elaborate. The communication tunnels were initially dug out to a size of 7 ft (2.1 m) by 7 ft (2.1 m) in cross-section but were later expanded to 8 ft (2.4 m) by 8 ft (2.4 m) to allow small vehicles to pass. Many of the tunnels are large enough to accommodate vehicles up to the size of trucks. The main tunnels were dug out to a cross-section of 15 ft (4.6 m) by 15 feet (4.6 m) for through traffic routes, with a passing place every 100 yards (91 m).

The environmental conditions in the tunnels were unpleasant for those who had to endure them. The temperature was a steady 16 °C (61 °F) to 18 °C (64 °F) but humidity was up to 98 per cent, causing condensation and damp throughout. One of the most distinguished occupants was General Dwight D. Eisenhower, who used the tunnels as his headquarters for the invasion of North Africa – Operation Torch – in November 1942. He later wrote:

At Gibraltar our headquarters were established in the most dismal setting we occupied during the war. The subterranean passages under the Rock provided the sole available office space, and in them was located the signal equipment by which we expected to keep in touch with the commanders of the three assault forces. The eternal darkness of the tunnels was here and there partially pierced by feeble electric bulbs. Damp, cold air in block-long passages was heavy with a stagnation that did not noticeably respond to the clattering efforts of electric fans. Through the arched ceilings came a constant drip, drip, drip of surface water that faithfully but drearily ticked off the seconds of the interminable, almost unendurable, wait which occurs between completion of a military plan and the moment action begins.

These conditions were alleviated by accommodating personnel in Nissen huts and Iris huts installed in chambers dug out to match their dimensions (24 ft (7.3 m) and 36 m (118 ft) spans respectively). The problem of rockfalls was alleviated to some extent by using arched soffits in all tunnels of over 12 ft (3.7 m) in span. Some of the chambers were of a truly huge size; the Royal Electrical and Mechanical Engineers' vehicle maintenance workshop was housed in a giant chamber spanning 50 feet (15 m) with a height of 10 m (33 ft) and a length of 115 metres (377 ft). More conventional chambers generally had a span of 28 ft (8.5 m) to 40 ft (12 m) and a length of 150 ft (46 m) to 200 ft (61 m), with a small section of tunnel called the "back drive" left open at the rear to connect each chamber to the next and facilitate the circulation of air. Without this, tunnels that were pure cul-de-sacs became unbearably damp. They were built in groups called "systems" which would each accommodate particular functions such as laundry, stores, accommodation and so on.

The humid conditions in the tunnels meant that ordinary corrugated iron corroded extremely rapidly, so the buildings within the tunnels were constructed using iron sheeting that had been coated in bitumen. A gap of 2 feet (0.61 m) was left between the buildings and the rock walls to enable ventilation and drainage and to facilitate inspections of the rock. Power was provided by four electrical power stations with a total installed load of 1,200 kW; water, electricity and oil were channelled via pipes and cables fixed to the tunnel walls, with drainage pipes running along the floors. The ventilation was provided by natural currents of air.

During the Cold War, the tunnels were adapted to provide protection against blast and heat flash from nearby atomic detonations. Blast traps were added to both pedestrian and vehicle entrances. The pedestrian blast traps were relatively simple, consisting of three blast walls overlapping by at least three-quarters of the width of the tunnel. A more elaborate approach had to be adopted for vehicle tunnels, where L-shaped entrances equipped with blast pockets were cut. The blast pockets were intended to absorb and reflect the blast wave, preventing it reaching far inside the tunnel complex. Gas locks were also installed to protect against contamination from the outside.

== Today ==
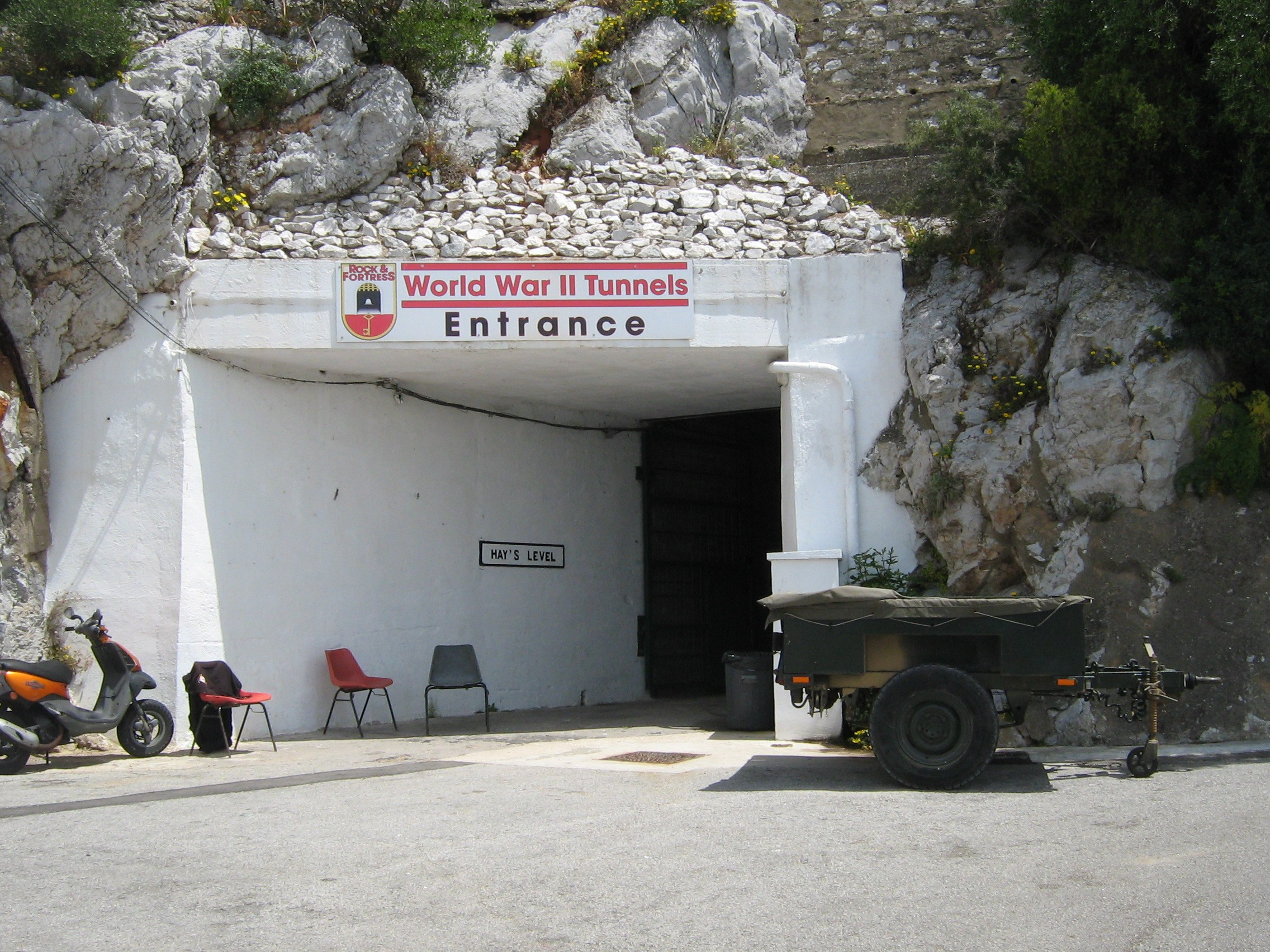
Entrance to Second World War tunnels on northwestern side of Rock of Gibraltar

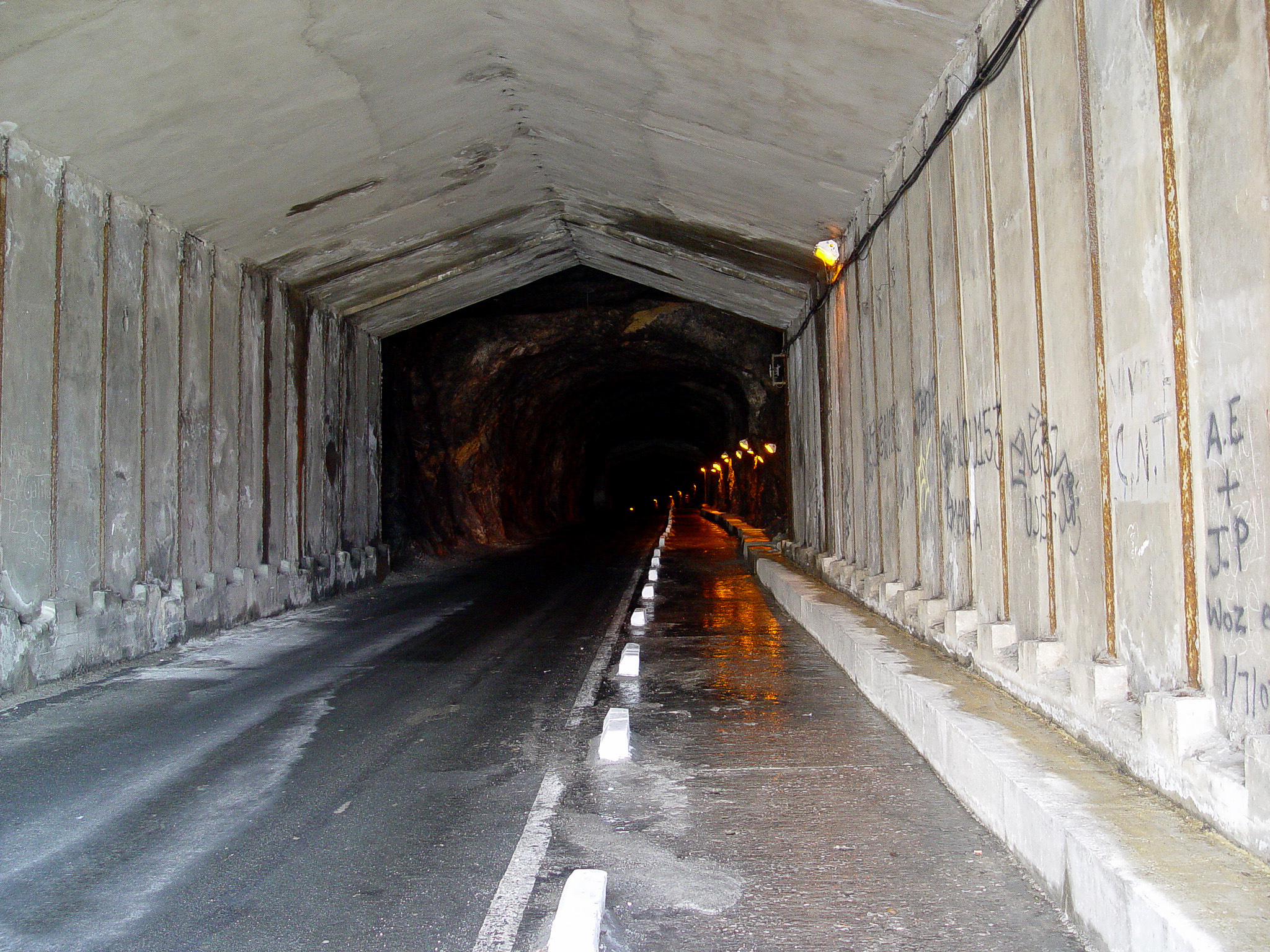
Keightley Way road tunnel, constructed in 1960

The reduction in the British military presence from the 1980s onwards has led to decommissioning of many of the tunnels. The responsibility for maintaining them was devolved to the Government of Gibraltar's Ministry of Works and then to the British Ministry of Public Building and Works, and their successors.

Some of the tunnels are now open to the public. The Upper Galleries, excavated during the Great Siege, are now a tourist attraction under the name of the Great Siege Tunnels. The Middle Galleries and some of the Second World War tunnels can be visited and are advertised as the World War II Tunnels. The Lower Galleries are abandoned and theoretically off-limits. Most of the Second World War and post-war tunnels are closed to the public – some, notably AROW Street, have been sealed off altogether as being too dangerous to enter. The Admiralty Tunnel is now a secure data storage facility. Two of the post-war tunnels, Keightley Way and Dudley Ward Way, are open to civilian vehicle traffic to facilitate journeys between the west and south of Gibraltar, and along the precipitous east coast of the peninsula.

== Bibliography ==
- "The Tunnels". After the Battle (21). Battle of Britain International. 1978.
- Brayley, Martin (2012). The British Army 1939–45. Vol. 2: Middle East & Mediterranean. Oxford: Osprey Books. ISBN 978-1-78096445-4.
- Connolly, Thomas William John (1855). The History of the Corps of Royal Sappers and Miners. Vol. 1. London: Longman, Brown, Green, Longmans.
- Eisenhower, Dwight D. (1948). Crusade in Europe. London: William Heinemann.
- Fa, Darren; Finlayson, Clive (2006). The Fortifications of Gibraltar. Oxford: Osprey Publishing. ISBN 1-84603-016-1.
- Hughes, Quentin; Migos, Athanassios (1995). Strong as the Rock of Gibraltar. Gibraltar: Exchange Publications. OCLC 48491998.
- Rose, Edward P.F. (2000). "Fortress Gibraltar". In Rose, Edward P.F.; Nathanail, C. Paul (eds.). Geology and Warfare: Examples of the Influence of Terrain and Geologists on Military Operations. Geological Society. ISBN 978-1-86239065-2.
- ——— (2001). "Military Engineering on the Rock of Gibraltar and its Geoenvironmental Legacy". In Ehlen, Judy; Harmon, Russell S. (eds.). The Environmental Legacy of Military Operations. Boulder, CO: Geological Society of America. ISBN 0-8137-4114-9.
