= Rubb =

Tension fabric building manufacturer

Rubb Building Systems
- Company type: Private
- Industry: Engineering
- Founded: 1968
- Headquarters: Nesttun, Norway (Rubb Hall A/S); Gateshead, England (Rubb Buildings Ltd.); Sanford, Maine, United States (Rubb, Inc.)
- Products: Fabric buildings and shelters
- Number of employees: 253
- Website: rubb.com

Rubb Building Systems is a privately owned manufacturer of tension fabric buildings and shelters, also known as Rubb halls. With origins in Norway, the company has locations in Rubbestadneset and Bergen, Norway, Sanford, Maine, and Gateshead, Tyne & Wear, United Kingdom.

Rubb provides structures as either buildings or shelters. Buildings are fully engineered and designed to multiple design standards and building codes, including AISC, AISI, ASTM, ASCE, AWS, and NFPA in the United States, and British Standards (BS). Shelters are designed to endure harsh weather, but the manufacturer makes no claims concerning load capability other than to provide destructive test results obtained from factory tests.

In the commercial aviation sector, Rubb has furnished aircraft hangars to major airline carriers including United Airlines and AirTran Airways. Rubb structures are currently located at Boston's Logan International Airport and Atlanta International Airport. The aircraft hangars are primarily used for aircraft line maintenance of Boeing 717 and Boeing 777 aircraft.

Rubb sports buildings are predominantly found in the United Kingdom, including indoor football facilities for Newcastle United and West Bromwich Albion along with an indoor tennis court for the Chesterfield Lawn Tennis Club. In the United States, examples of sports buildings include the multipurpose Portland Sports Complex in Portland, Maine and the Challenge Unlimited equestrian facility in Andover, Massachusetts.
