= Daniel House (Knoxville, Tennessee) =

Historic house in Tennessee, United States

- U.S. National Register of Historic Places
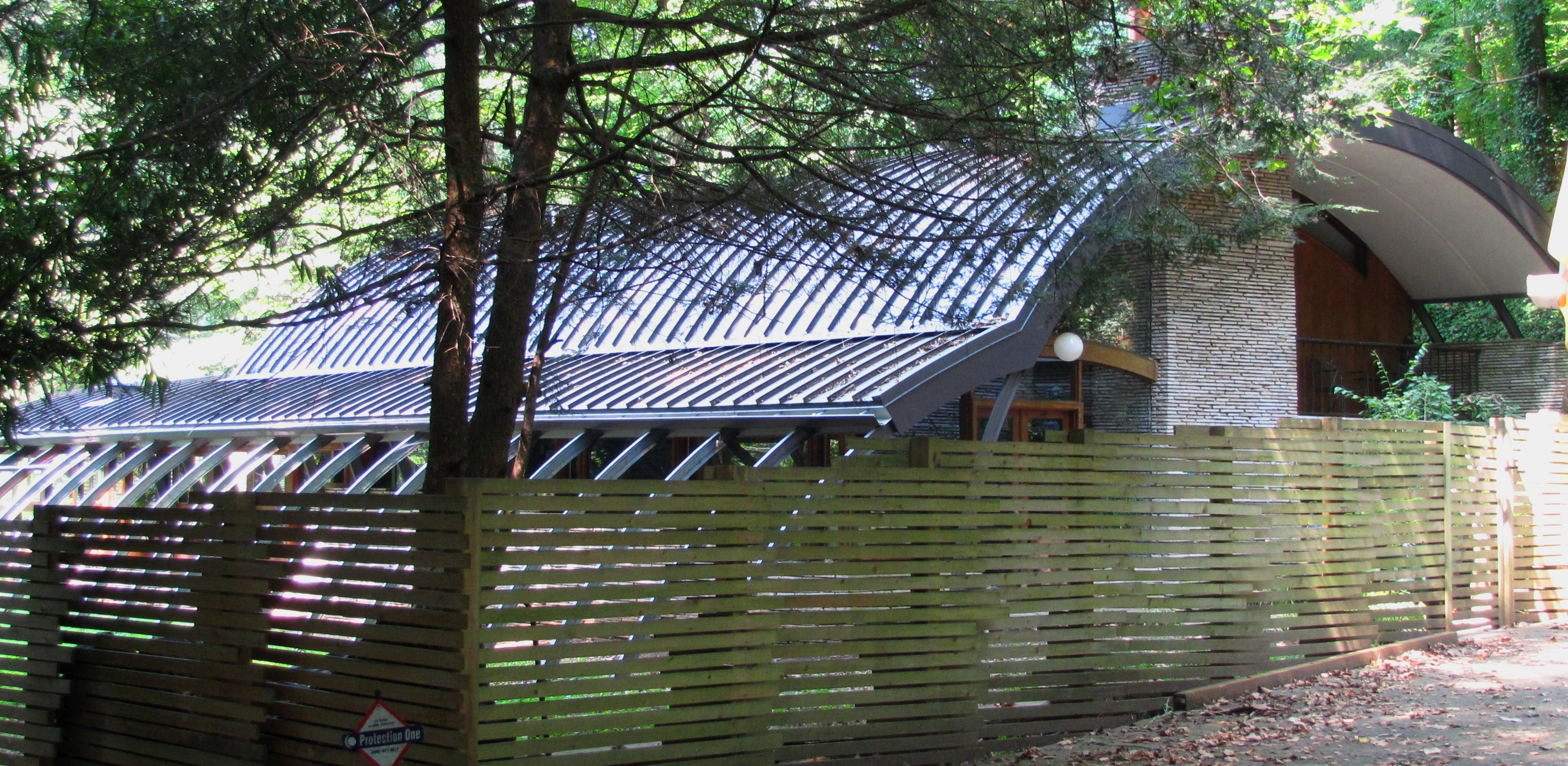
- Location: 2701 Woodson Dr. Knoxville, Tennessee
- Coordinates: 35°55′23″N 83°56′57″W
- Built: 1949
- Architect: James W. Fitzgibbon
- Architectural style: Moderne
- NRHP reference No.: 98000240
- Added to NRHP: March 19, 1998

The Daniel House is a historic home located at 2701 Woodson Drive in Knoxville, Tennessee. It was designed in 1948–1949 by James W. Fitzgibbon, and constructed by George W. Qualls.

The structure was uniquely built into a hillside from salvaged Quonset hut structural supports. The Daniels sold it to Neal Cantrell in 1961. Cantrell died in 1970 and his family let the property deteriorate. In 1982, architect Peter Calandruccio bought it for $37,000 and began renovation. In 1986, Fine Homebuilding magazine published Calandruccio's extensive account of the renovations.

Donald Renfroe bought it for $175,000 in 1993. Previous owner Alexis Walsh owned the home since purchasing it from Johnny Miller in July 2008, and subsequently it was renovated again, including the installation of a new roof. It was sold in 2015 to Candace Avery who is the current owner.

The house was designed in the Moderne architectural style (as opposed to Modern Architecture). Its use of indigenous East Tennessee materials and its Streamline Moderne style have been described as "distinctive". It was listed on the National Register of Historic Places in 1998.
