= Quonset hut =

Lightweight prefabricated structure

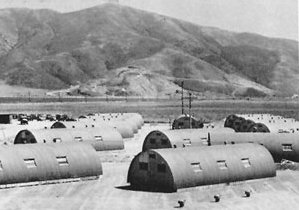
Quonset huts at Point Mugu, California, in 1946 with Laguna Peak in the background.

A Quonset hut /ˈkwɒnsɪt/ is a lightweight prefabricated structure of corrugated galvanized steel with a semi-circular cross-section. The design was developed in the United States based on the Nissen hut introduced by the British during World War I. 170,000 Quonset huts were manufactured during World War II, and the military sold its surplus huts to the public after the war. The name comes from the site of their first deployment at Quonset Point at the Davisville Naval Construction Battalion Center in Davisville, Rhode Island.

== Design and history ==
The first Quonset huts were manufactured in 1941 when the United States Navy needed a lightweight, all-purpose building that could be shipped anywhere and assembled without skilled labor. They could be assembled in a day by a 10-person team using only hand tools.

The George A. Fuller construction company manufactured them, and the first was produced within 60 days of signing the contract. In 1946, the Great Lakes Steel Corporation claimed "the term 'Quonset,' as applied to builders and building materials, is a trade mark owned by the Great Lakes Steel Corporation." But the word is often used generically. Today similar structures are made by many contractors in countries around the world.

A Quonset hut could accommodate twenty enlisted men or twelve officers, or if used for commanders perhaps four officers.

The original design was a 16-by-36-foot (4.9 m × 11.0 m) structure framed with steel members with an 8-foot (2.4 m) radius. The most common design created a standard size of 20 by 48 feet (6.1 m × 14.6 m) with a 16-foot (4.9 m) base dimension, allowing 960 square feet (89 m^{2}) of usable floor space with optional 4-foot (1.2 m) overhangs at each end for protection of entrances from the weather. Other sizes were developed, including 20-by-40-foot (6.1 m × 12.2 m) and 40-by-100-foot (12 m × 30 m) warehouse models.

The sides were corrugated steel sheets, and the two ends were covered with plywood which had doors and windows. The interior was insulated and had pressed-wood lining and a wood floor. The building could be placed on concrete, on pilings, or directly on the ground with a wood floor. The original design used low-grade steel, which was later replaced by a more rust-resistant version. The flexible interior space was open, allowing use as barracks, latrines, medical and dental offices, isolation wards, housing, and bakeries.

170,000 Quonset huts are estimated to have been manufactured during World War II. Some were sold off after the war. Many remain standing throughout the United States as outbuildings, businesses, or even homes, and they are often seen at military museums and other places featuring World War II memorabilia. Many were also used around the United States for temporary postwar housing, such as Rodger Young Village for veterans and their families in Los Angeles, California, and the Quonset Park complex of married student housing at the University of Iowa. Some are still in active use at United States military bases. The U.S. Department of Energy continues to use Quonset huts as supporting structures (fabrication and machine shops, warehouses, etc.) at the Nevada National Security Site. The repurposed huts were common enough that Sherwin-Williams introduced a line of paint called "Quon-Kote" specifically designed to stick to the metal structures.

== In popular culture ==
After World War II, surplus Quonset huts became popular as housing in Hawaii. They became known as "kamaboko houses" due to their half-cylindrical shape, similar to a slab of kamaboko.

== Gallery ==
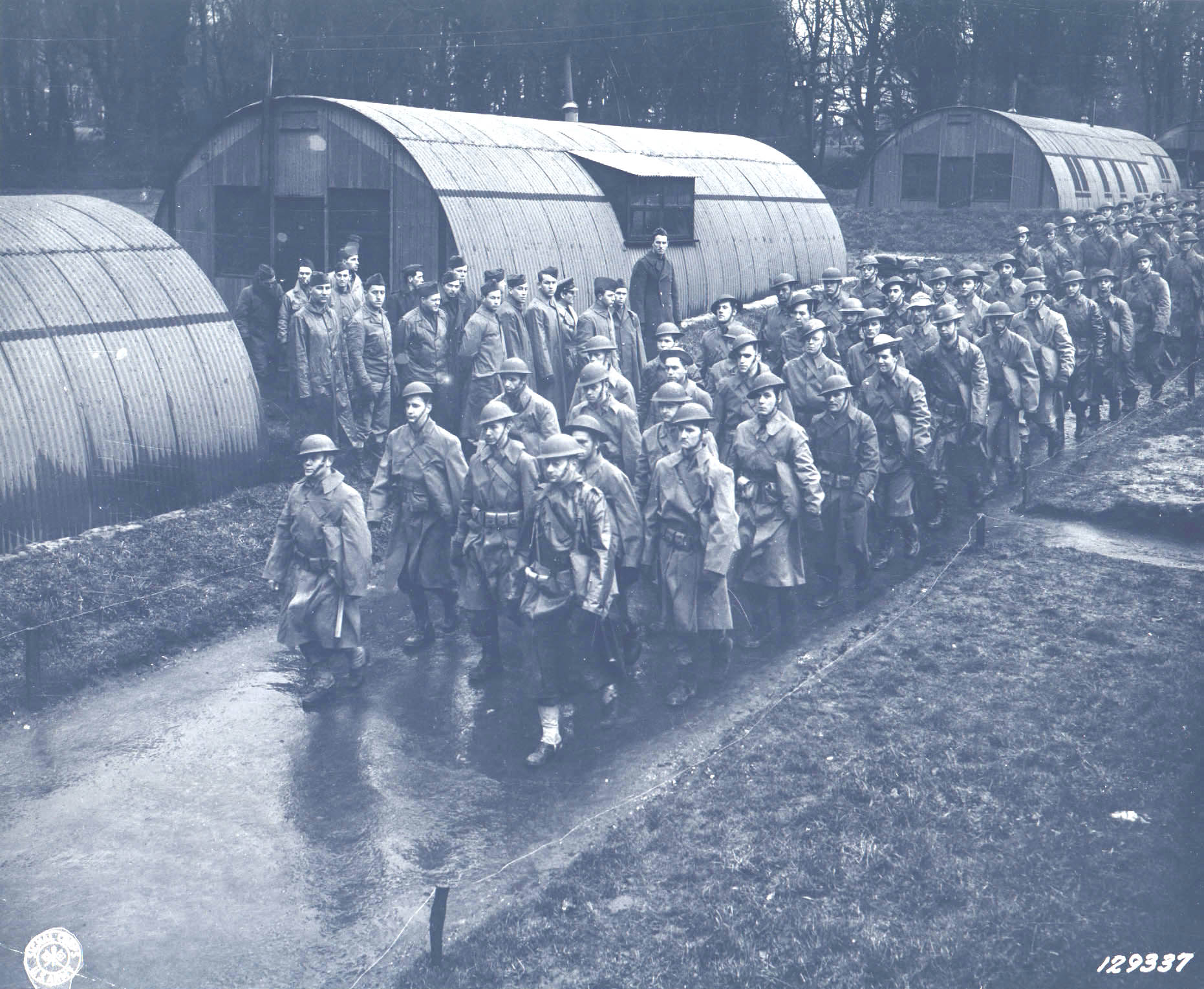
American troops in Northern Ireland, 1942

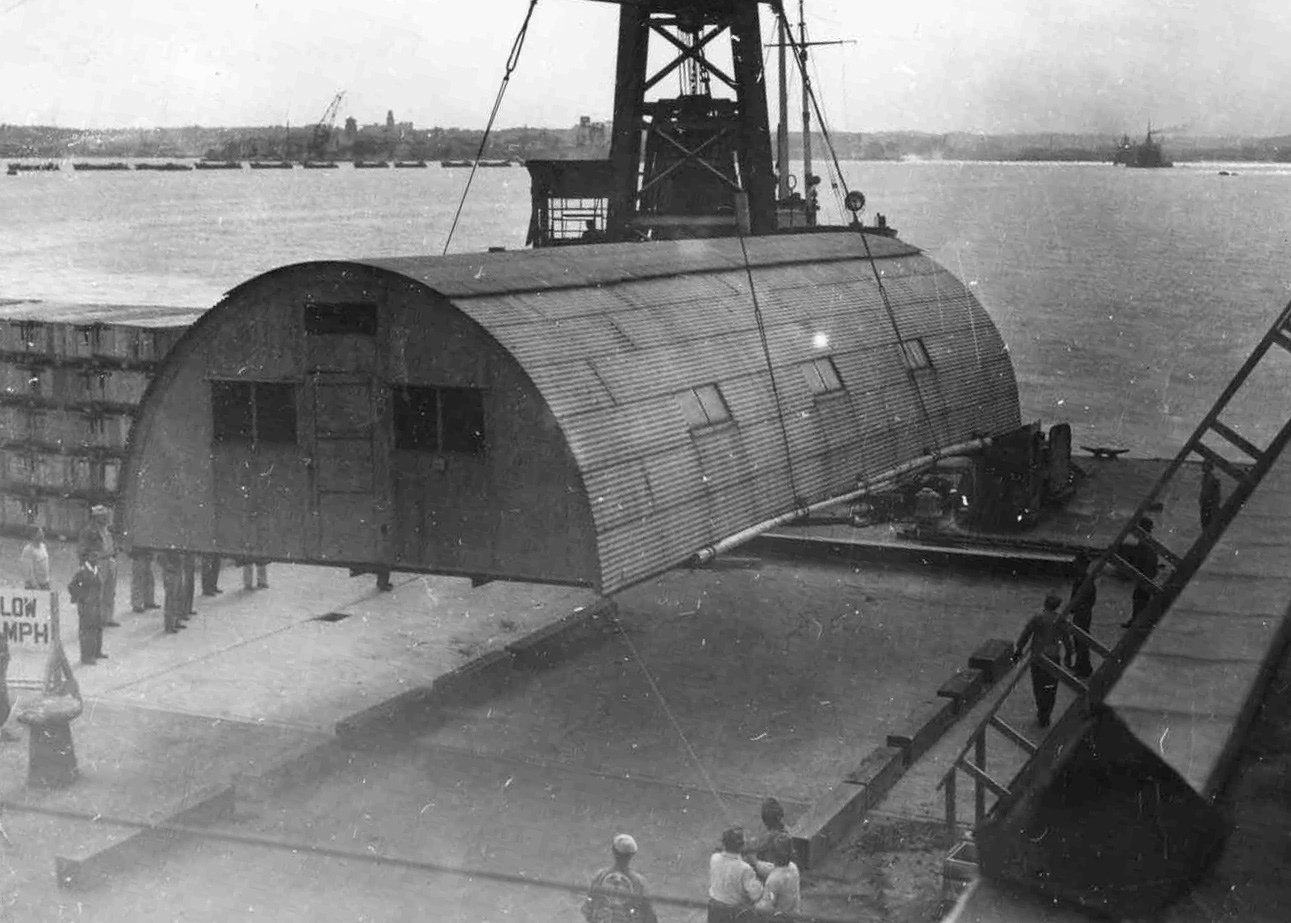
A Quonset hut being put in place at the 598th Engineer Base Depot in Japan, post–World War II

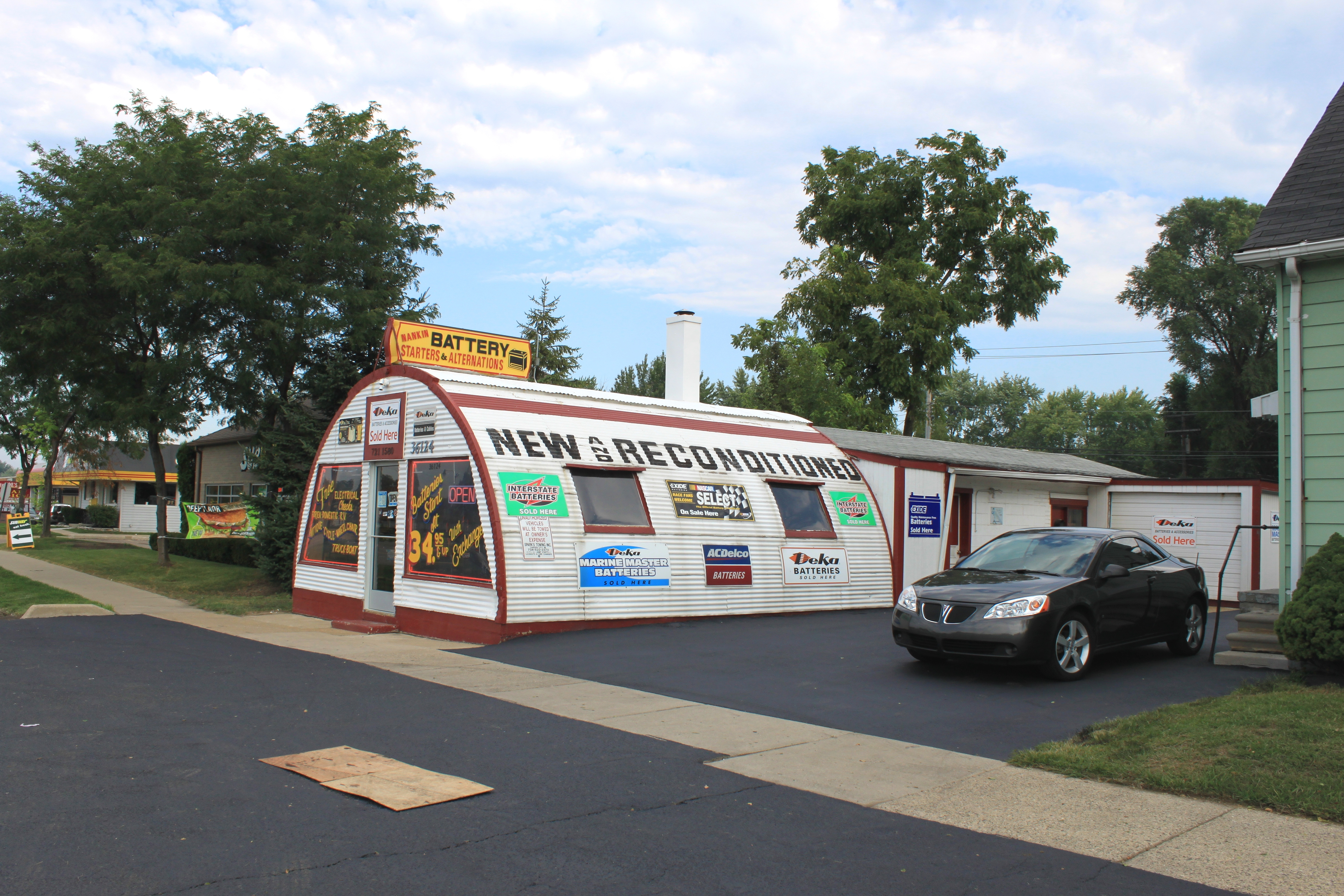
Quonset hut adapted for commercial use in Westland, Michigan

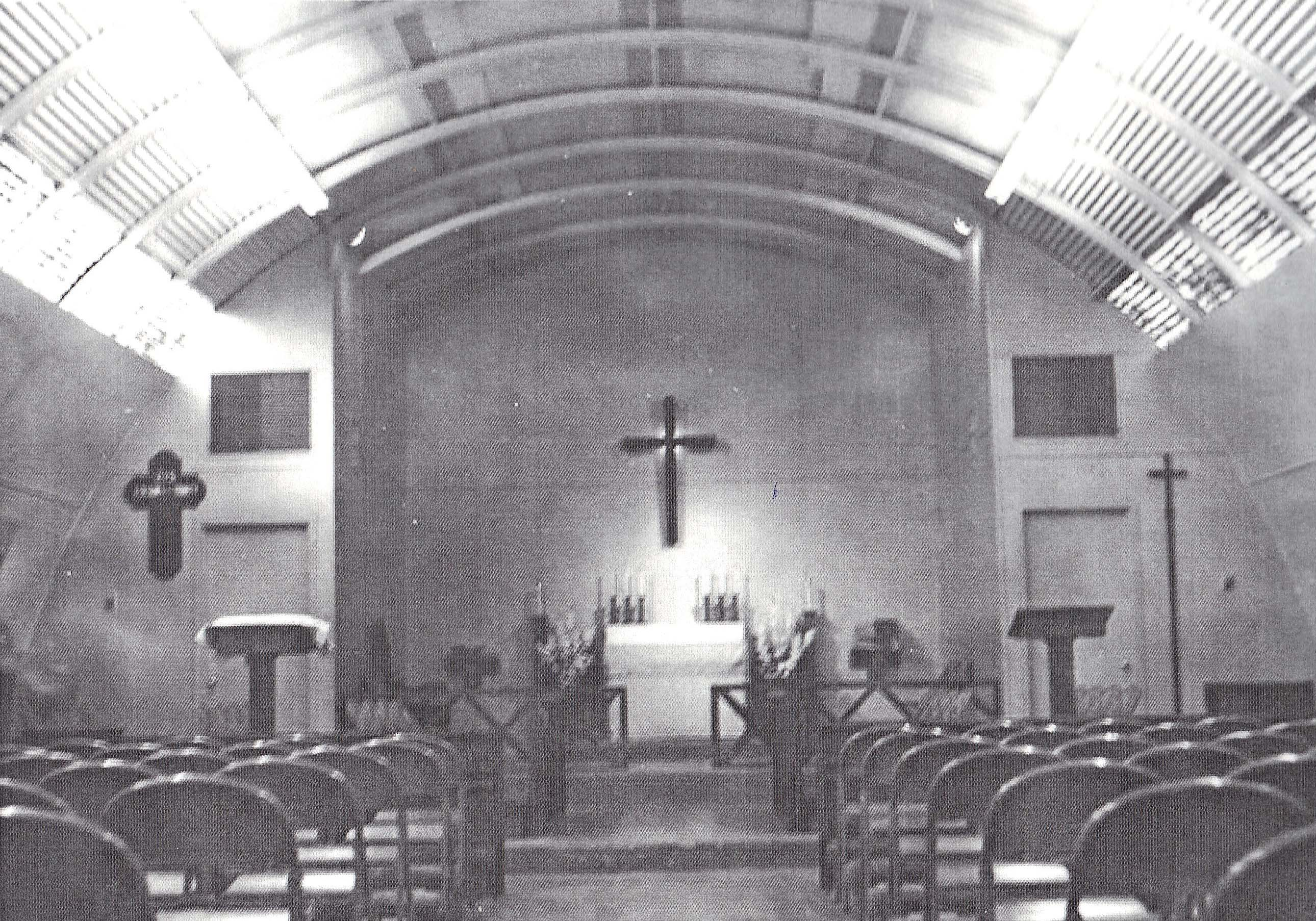
The original St. Barnabas church in Paradise Valley, Arizona

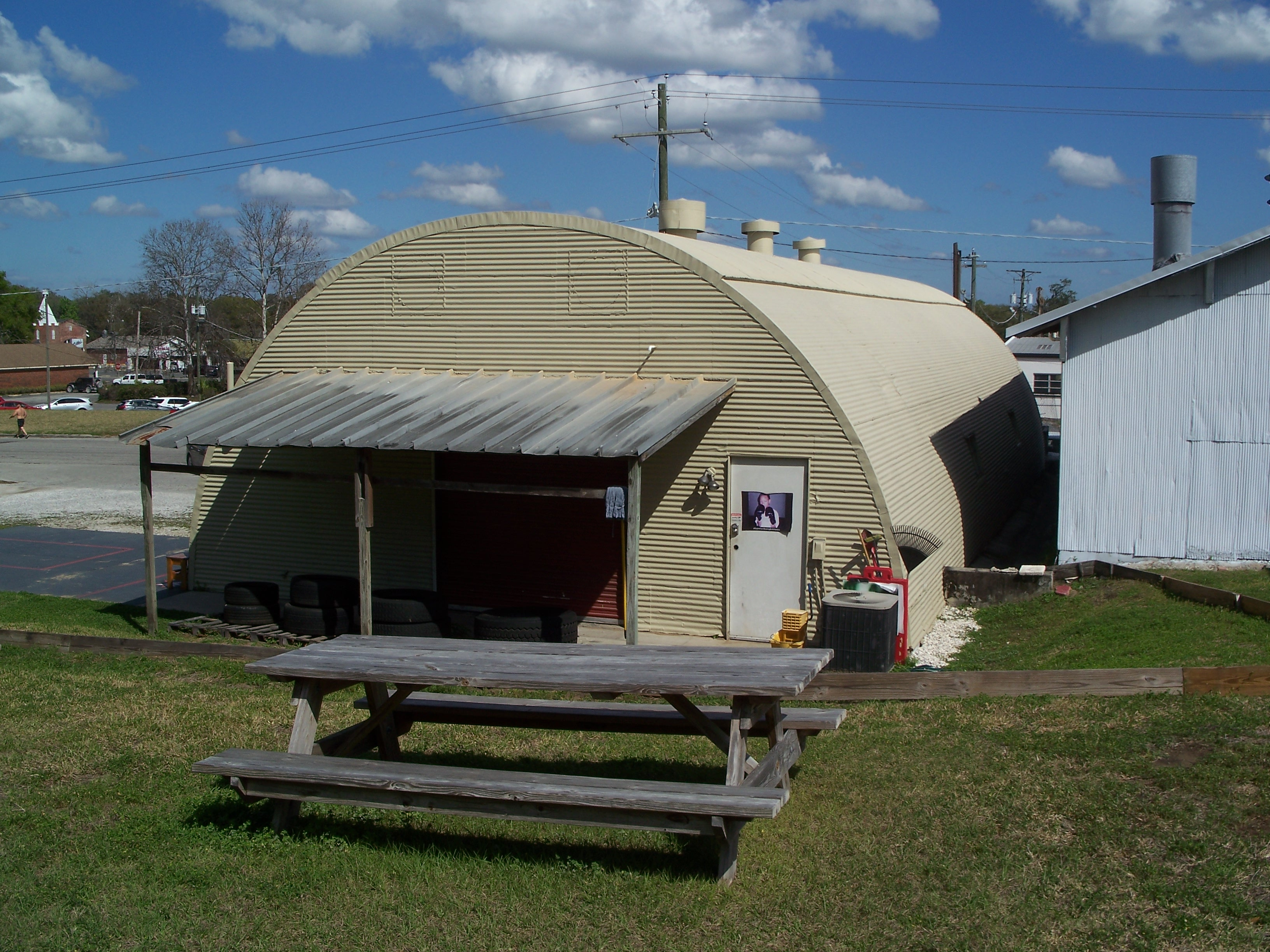
A Quonset hut in Dade City, Florida

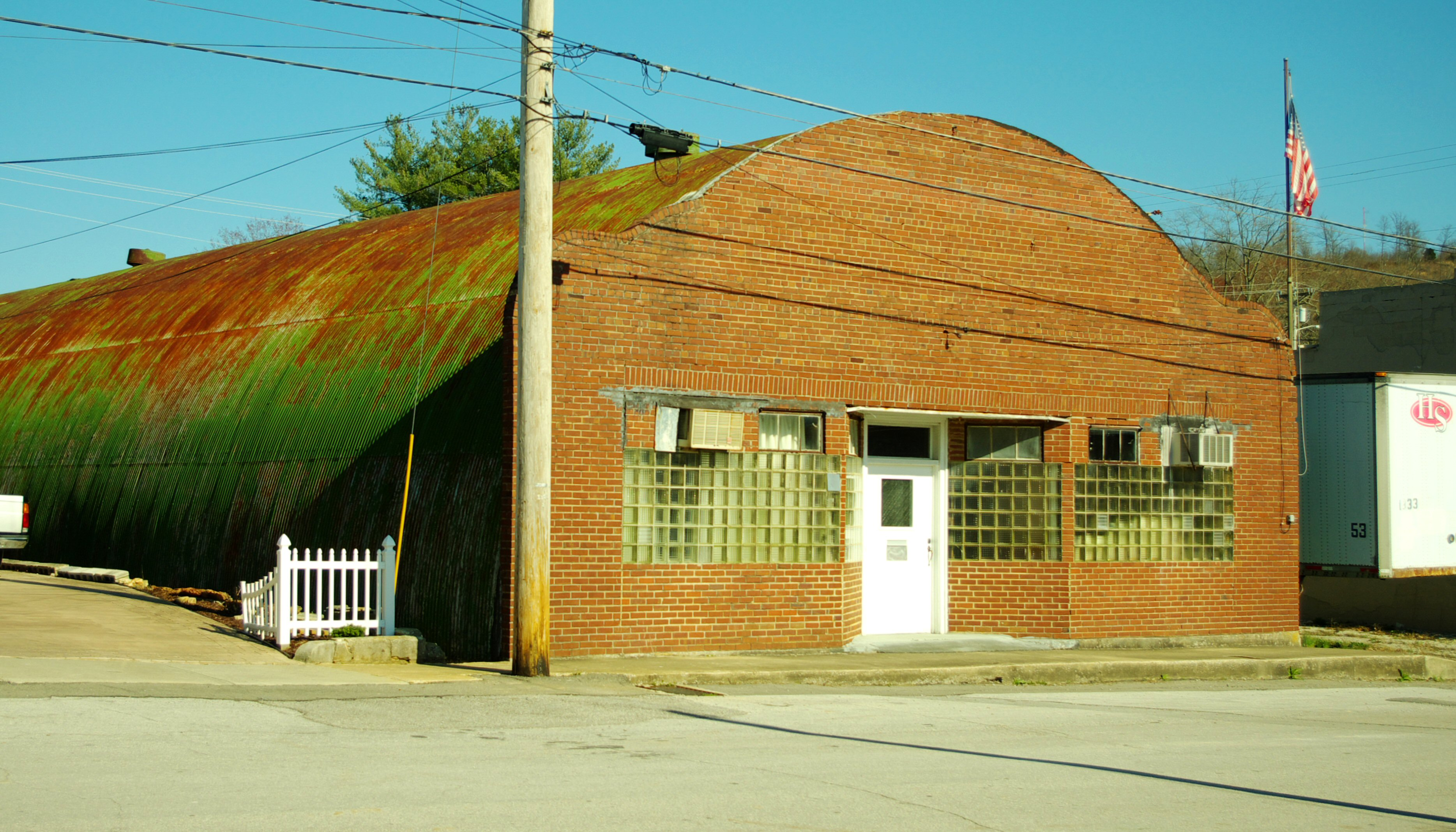
American Legion Hut, Livingston, Tennessee

Fred's Tavern, Dodge City, Kansas

== See also ==
- Daniel House (Knoxville, Tennessee)
- Dymaxion deployment unit
- Iris hut and Romney hut, similar British prefabricated structures used in WWII
- Jamesway hut
- Longhouses of the indigenous peoples of North America
- Nissen hut
- Patera Building
- Abbey of Our Lady of the Holy Trinity, a former Trappist monastery in Utah housed in Quonset huts.
