= Admiralty Tunnel =

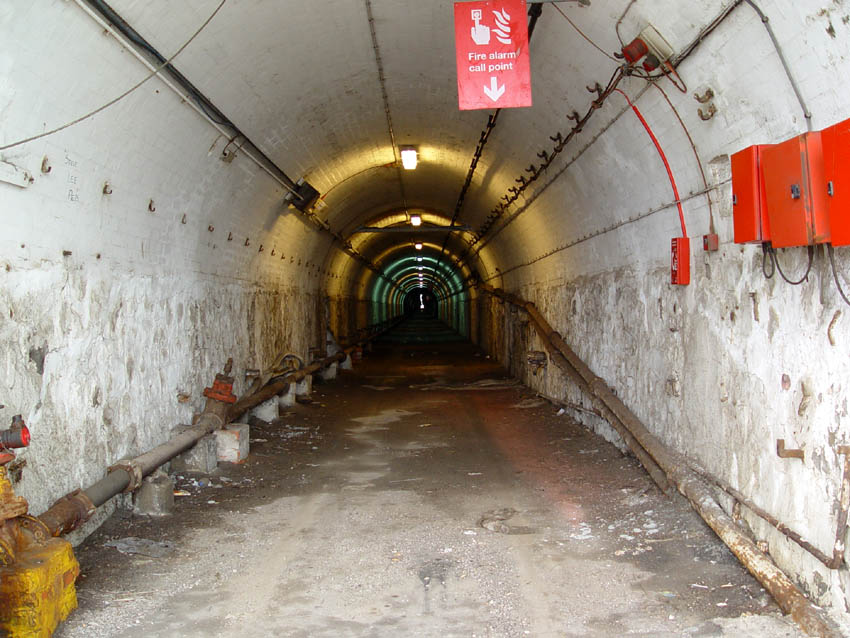
- View down the tunnel
- Interactive map of Admiralty Tunnel

Overview
- Location: Gibraltar
- Coordinates: 36.129634°N 5.352938°W
- Status: private

Operation
- Constructed: Cochrane Ltd
- Owner: Government of Gibraltar
- Operator: Continent 8

Technical
- Length: 1,000 metres (3,300 ft)

Admiralty Tunnel is a tunnel in Gibraltar. The tunnel was used for the purpose of bringing stone from the east side. During the Second World War the tunnel contained an operations centre where Dwight Eisenhower planned Operation Torch. As of 2013, the operations centre is used to house a secure data facility.

== History ==
The new navy base was begun in 1893, but for some time the stone was brought by barge from the east side of the rock to Gibraltar Harbour on the west side. The tunnel allowed stone from the quarries on the east side to be brought via a one-metre narrow gauge railway to help construct the navy base on the west side.

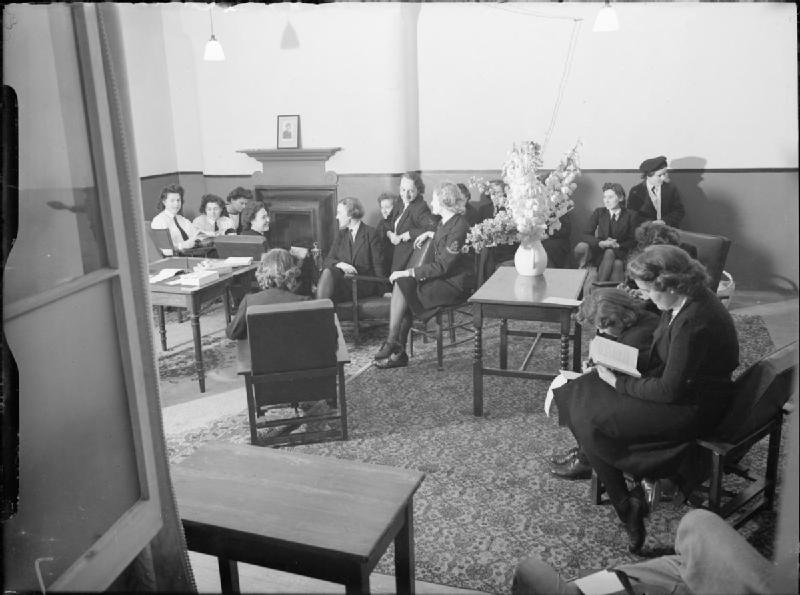
The Women's Royal Naval Service relaxing in their recreation room inside the rock during World War Two. This is the type of accommodation available inside the rock during the war

It is the only tunnel that runs from east to the west of the Rock of Gibraltar, and during World War II the tunnel was reworked and a 3,000-square-metre area roughly halfway down it became a state-of-the-art communications centre. This Allied Command Headquarters centre was protected from enemy bombs by metres of rock in every direction and contained the board room where the invasion of North Africa (Operation Torch) was planned by Dwight Eisenhower. As a result, Eisenhower not only commanded the operation, but he was the first non-British person to command Gibraltar in 200 years. It had its own systems for fresh air, electricity, lighting and communication links to the outside world.

The space now contains a very secure data storage facility previously owned by Vault Technology Services and now operated by Continent 8. The size of the data storage facility is 3,000 square metres (32,000 sq ft), which is split up into 80 separate rooms. It is not open to the public but it is possible to see from one end to the other and thus to observe how straight the tunnel is. The west end of the tunnel is accessible from Queensway.
