= B hut =

Type of military barrack

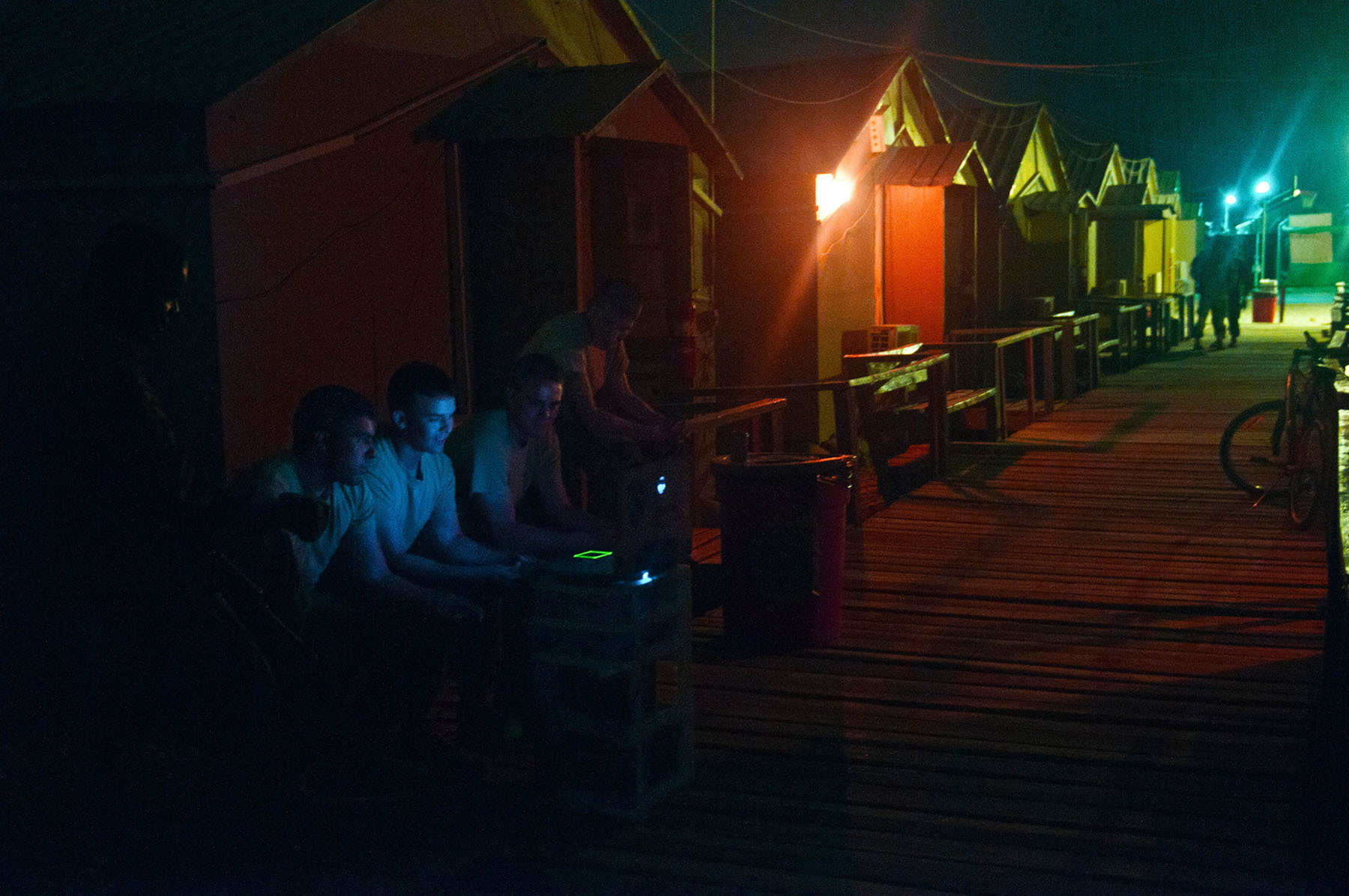
B huts at Bagram Airfield, Afghanistan (2011)

B Hut is an abbreviation for "Barracks Hut", used in the US military to refer to temporary billets.

The British Army commonly used the term "Barracks Hut" to refer to temporary billets as far back as the 1800s. Barracks Hut was almost always used when referring to cheaply made temporary shelter or housing. Since the US invasion of Afghanistan, the abbreviated term "B-Hut" has become a common term for US soldiers and contractors alike. The B-Hut is much more common in Afghanistan than Iraq due to the lack of infrastructure, building materials (besides mud) and of permanent buildings, by western standards. It is suggested, not confirmed, that the term B-Hut/Barracks Hut was carried over in vocabulary from British occupation and influence in Afghanistan during the early 1900s.

Often referred to as a "hooch", the B-Hut usually houses up to eight single persons, but can contain more if not broken down into separate rooms. It is cheaply made (US Gov't cost of about $15,000 each at time of construction) of plywood and divided up into separate rooms with a common walkway down the center, or left open containing one large space. A typical B-hut has two entrances, two or three fluorescent lights on the ceiling, a small ductless air conditioning unit above each door. Each room usually has a window with a latch for ventilation and an electrical outlet for each occupant. B-huts afford no protection from indirect or direct fire and are often ridiculed by the service members and contractors who reside in them, but they offer limited privacy to the occupants by allowing them to have their own rooms.

B-huts require constant maintenance and painting and are built knowing that they are only expected to last three or four years. Hot climates can cause the plywood structure to deteriorate quickly. In 2011, the US Department of Defense offered contracts to build concrete B-Huts in Afghanistan.
