= Rubb hall =

Relocatable tent-like structure

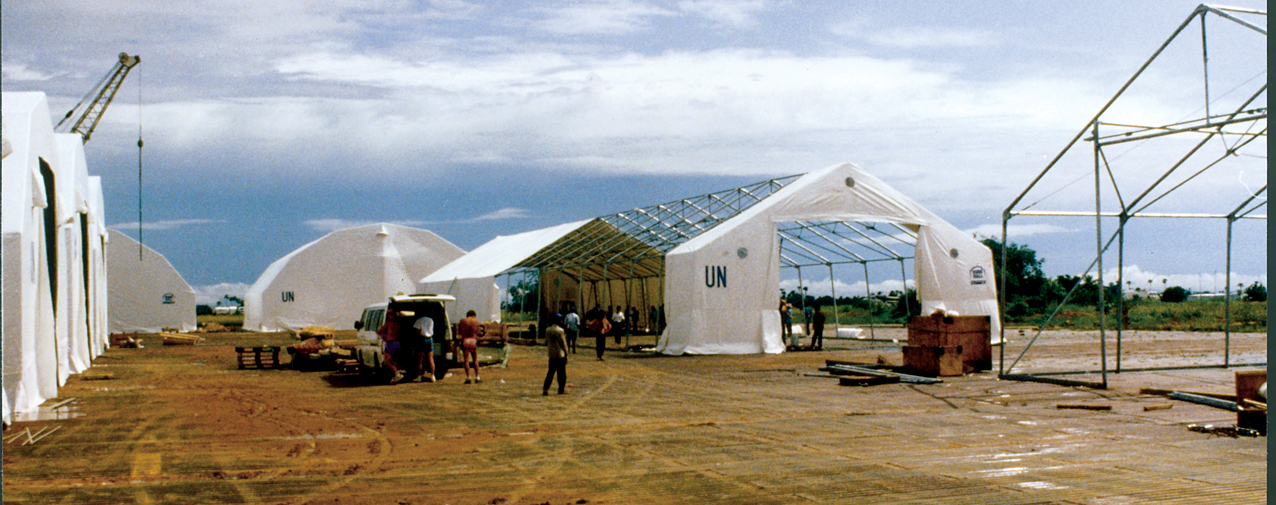
Rubb Halls in Cambodia

A Rubb Hall is a commercial name for particularly large, relocatable tent-like structure often used in situations of emergency (e.g. humanitarian) and temporary industry (e.g. construction projects). The name derives from Rubb Building Systems, and Hall Engineering of Bergen Norway, manufacturers of this kind of structure. Other types of similar structure include HAGUHALL.

Rubb Halls are usually made of aluminium frames, with steel tension wires and polyester skins. They typically come in sections so the length can be determined by the number of sections employed. A common standard size is an area of 200 square metres. Doors at either end are made from the same material as the walls, and are drawn back like curtains. More secure and longer lasting structures include Flospan - frameless steel structures.

Various specialised modifications are possible, including the fitting of artificial ceilings inside, together with doors in end walls, to facilitate heating. It is also not unheard of to have a frame erected inside to provide a second floor.

In humanitarian aid situations, Rubb Halls are often used as warehouses for items such as food and medicine. They are also used for temporary emergency shelter for large numbers of people, and as spaces for activities such as person registration to take place under shelter.

== See also ==
- Nissen hut
