= Patera Building =

Prefabricated building prototype

The Patera Building prototype, a significant example of British high-tech architecture, was manufactured in Stoke-on-Trent in 1982 by Patera Products Ltd., and is one of only two surviving examples of this prototype, currently identified as at risk of demolition by heritage organisations. In 1980, Michael Hopkins architects and Anthony Hunt Associates engineers were instructed by LIH (Properties) Ltd to design a prefabricated, relocatable industrial building with a 216 m² floor area, capable of rapid assembly and disassembly.

Longton Industrial Holdings Plc (LIH), an industrial group based in Stoke-on-Trent, Staffordshire, commissioned designs for an "off-the-peg" relocatable industrial building made from steel. They sought to expand their interests in steel fabrication, intending to sell the buildings as a product. The Patera Products Ltd factory where the Patera buildings were made and where the first two were erected was in Victoria Road, Fenton, Stoke-on-Trent, Staffordshire.

Patera Building in Stoke-on-Trent (1982)

== Clarification ==
This article traces the history of the prototype Patera Building completed in 1982 under the ownership and direction of Longton Industrial Holdings Plc through their wholly owned subsidiary companies LIH (Properties) Ltd, and Patera Products Ltd. The article does not cover "Patera Building System" (a later development of the Patera concept using several of the fabrication techniques such as the innovative panels, but with alternative traditional structural frames). The article does not cover the period during which the Patera concept was promoted under a trading name "Patera Products" ("Patera Products" was an acquired name, unrelated to the original company Patera Products Ltd), nor during the period in which the Patera concept was promoted under the trading name of Patera Engineering Ltd (established 1988), also an acquired name. Patera Engineering Ltd did not manufacture any Patera Buildings.

== History ==
The first prototype Patera Building was manufactured by Patera Products Ltd in 1982 by a workforce of experienced hands-on engineers and craftsmen drawn from industries in the area then in decline such as coal-mining. As almost every component was designed anew for the prototype, a high degree of accuracy was required as these prototype components formed a standard model to which future components were manufactured. The idea of the Patera project was to supply a factory-finished industrial workshop. The buildings were standardised, 18 metres long by 12 metres wide, with an internal height of 3.85 metres throughout. They were fully finished in the factory, ready for bolting together at the desired location. Three men with a forklift truck could erect one in a matter of days. It was seen in the context of vehicle- or boat-building technologies in terms of its light weight construction. Each building needed a reinforced concrete raft slab as a base to which the structure was fixed using specially designed steel castings. All the buildings' services—power, telephone cabling, water, etc.—were distributed within the depth of the building envelope.

To support panels struck by automotive-industry hydraulic presses, constituent parts of the Patera Building structure were pin-jointed for ease of handling and assembly. At the centres of the spans of the frames were unique "tension-only" links—special fittings able to respond to varying structural loads. Under normal conditions the structure acted as a three-pin arch. In other conditions, such as wind up-lift, it acted as a rigid frame. This innovation meant that very slender lightweight steel tubes could be used for the portal frame trusses. The "Patera Building Stoke-on-Trent for Longton Industrial Holdings (Properties) Ltd" received a commendation in the British Constructional Steelwork Association's Structural Steel Design Awards 1983, sponsored by the British Steel Corporation and the British Constructional Steelwork Association Ltd. The Judges' Comments: "The creative thought that lies behind this design breaks new ground in the excellence of its parts and their skilful integration in the making of an architectural whole. It is a delight to see such innovation and care being applied to the production of precisely fabricated, economical, small buildings."

== Use of reclaimed land ==
The Berry Hill area of Stoke-on-Trent had a history of coal mining and brick-making. The Patera Building prototype was built on drained and reclaimed land there, circumstances that informed the design—requiring lightness of weight and raft foundations. In the 1960s, visionary architect Cedric Price had proposed a Potteries Thinkbelt design which sought to make use of decommissioned railway routes following the Beeching Cuts and the scarred landscape of coal mining to provide linked learning centres for a technical industry-based curriculum. The first design studies for the Patera project in 1981 were for a managed industrial estate consisting of thirty or so standard Patera Buildings sited at the former Mossfield colliery in Longton, Stoke-on-Trent.

== Structural innovation ==
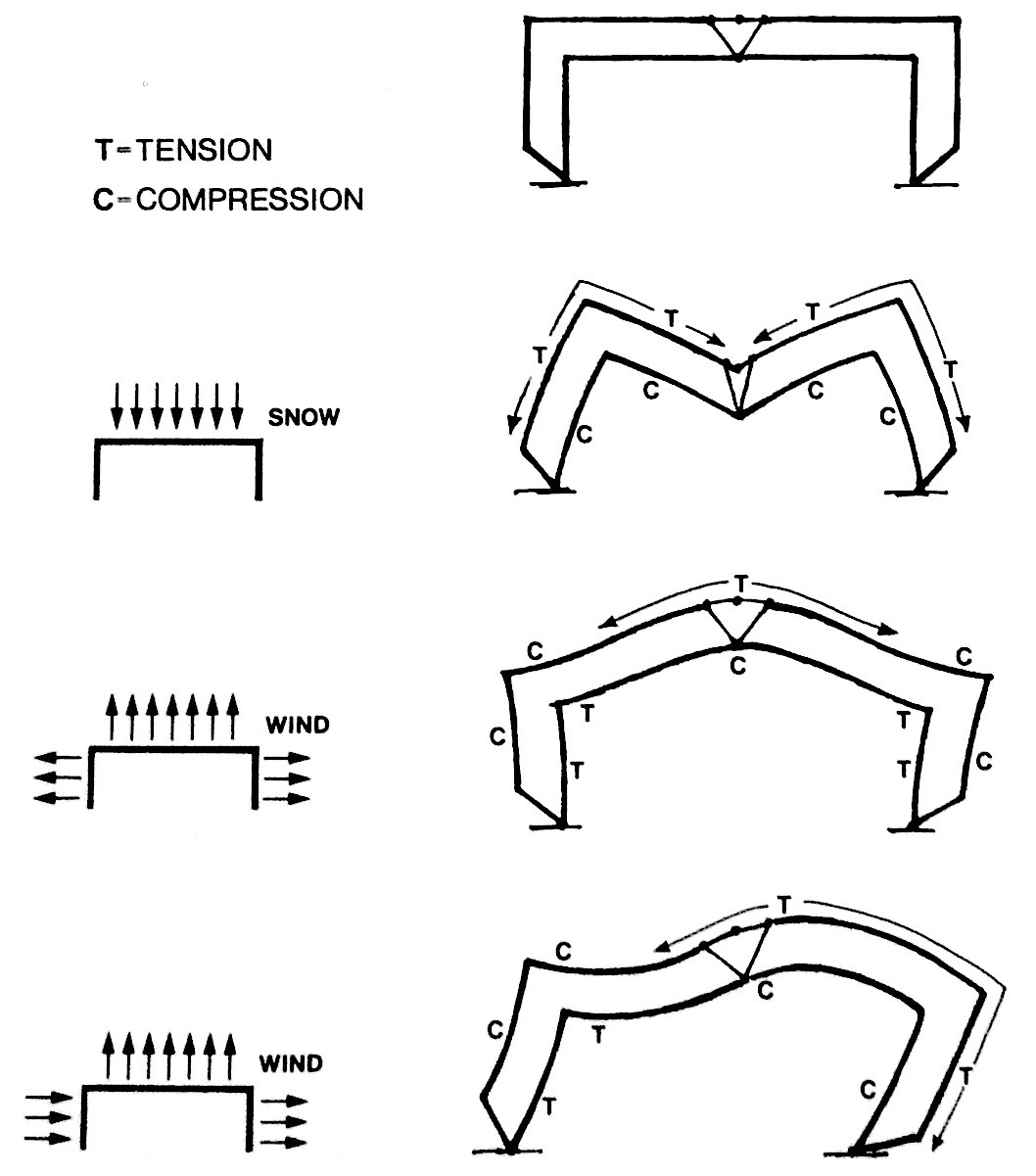
Patera Building Stoke-on-Trent 1982 Hybrid Structure Graphic

Anthony Hunt Associates devised a lightweight, all-steel structure, a hybrid three-pin arch. Made in easily transportable component form, once assembled it offered significant advantages:

- The elimination of cross-bracing elements to the roof and wall trusses;
- The use of panel assemblies as a diaphragm to prevent buckling of the lower (innermost) truss boom during compression;
- Introduction of a tension-only link at midspan to prevent outer roof truss booms from buckling under compression;
- Use of line bracing and secondary high-tensile-strength steel cross-bracing at the knee-joint position to prevent "flipping" of the structure under certain wind-loading;
- Introduction of steel castings for ease of fabrication of pin-joint connections;
- Development of distinctive cast steel base plates to allow structural bolted connections to a flat concrete-slab base;
- Wind loading analysis which allowed use anywhere within the UK mainland and climates where a similar pattern of wind speeds might prevail.
  Patera Building 1982 tension-only link designed by Mark Whitby then of engineers Anthony Hunt Associates

== Innovation in manufacturing techniques ==
With steel panels pressed and factory-finished rather than being cold-rolled, and with all components accurately sized and with their fixings prepositioned, the following advantages ensued:

- All components sized to fit efficiently within a standard 40-foot (12 m) shipping container;
- Ease of site assembly;
- Interchangeable components within a single building or between others, allowed flexibility of layout and use;
- Standard buildings made available;
- Fully finished externally and internally;
- Services such as power, water, and communications routed within building shell.

== Commercial implementation ==
The Patera Building was launched in November 1981 at Interbuild, a building exhibition at the National Exhibition Centre (NEC) Birmingham, with the wording: "Patera Building: A new concept in building design to provide efficient working units which combine good looks with engineering quality at sensible prices".

The first two buildings were erected at the site adjacent to the Patera Products Ltd factory in Stoke-on-Trent where they stayed in place for some two years. They were used as demonstration buildings, part of the marketing of the project. Sites where other buildings were erected include Barrow-in-Furness, Canary Wharf, and the Royal Docks in London. LIH Plc hosted a Royal visit by Duke of Gloucester, an architect himself, during which he was shown around the workshops and the buildings.

1984–85: After the manufacturing company Patera Products Ltd was closed down, the two stock buildings—the prototype and another similarly sized building—were each extended from five bays to six and moved to London's Canary Wharf to be used as BT exhibition space provided by London Docklands Development Corporation. Neighbours were the now-demolished Limehouse TV Studios and the giant dishes of a satellite receiving station established for improved business communication. The site was on the late-1980s route of the London Marathon between the fifteenth and sixteenth mile marks. In 1989, to make way for the much-heralded high-rise commercial development planned for Canary Wharf, Limehouse TV Studios was compulsorily purchased and demolished, and one of the two Patera Buildings (the original prototype) was moved to its third location on Albert Island. It was until October 2018 used as a workshop on a boat repair yard and marina by Gallions Point Marina Ltd, when the company faced eviction from the site to make way for development of the Royal Docks Enterprise Zone. The other, the second-ever standard Patera Building, was moved from its Canary Wharf site in c. 1989 to become a part of the LDDC temporary offices adjacent to the Docklands Light Railway close to Royal Victoria Dock.

== Future ==
Through a multi-agency initiative led by Twentieth Century Society, application was made to Historic England for the building to be listed. If the application had been successful, then the Docklands Patera Building would have been carefully stabilised, conserved, and moved once more to make way for development in the London Royal Docks Enterprise Zone. Interested parties associated with the listing process have accepted that the Docklands Patera Building is in fact the original 1982 prototype manufactured and first assembled in Stoke-on-Trent.

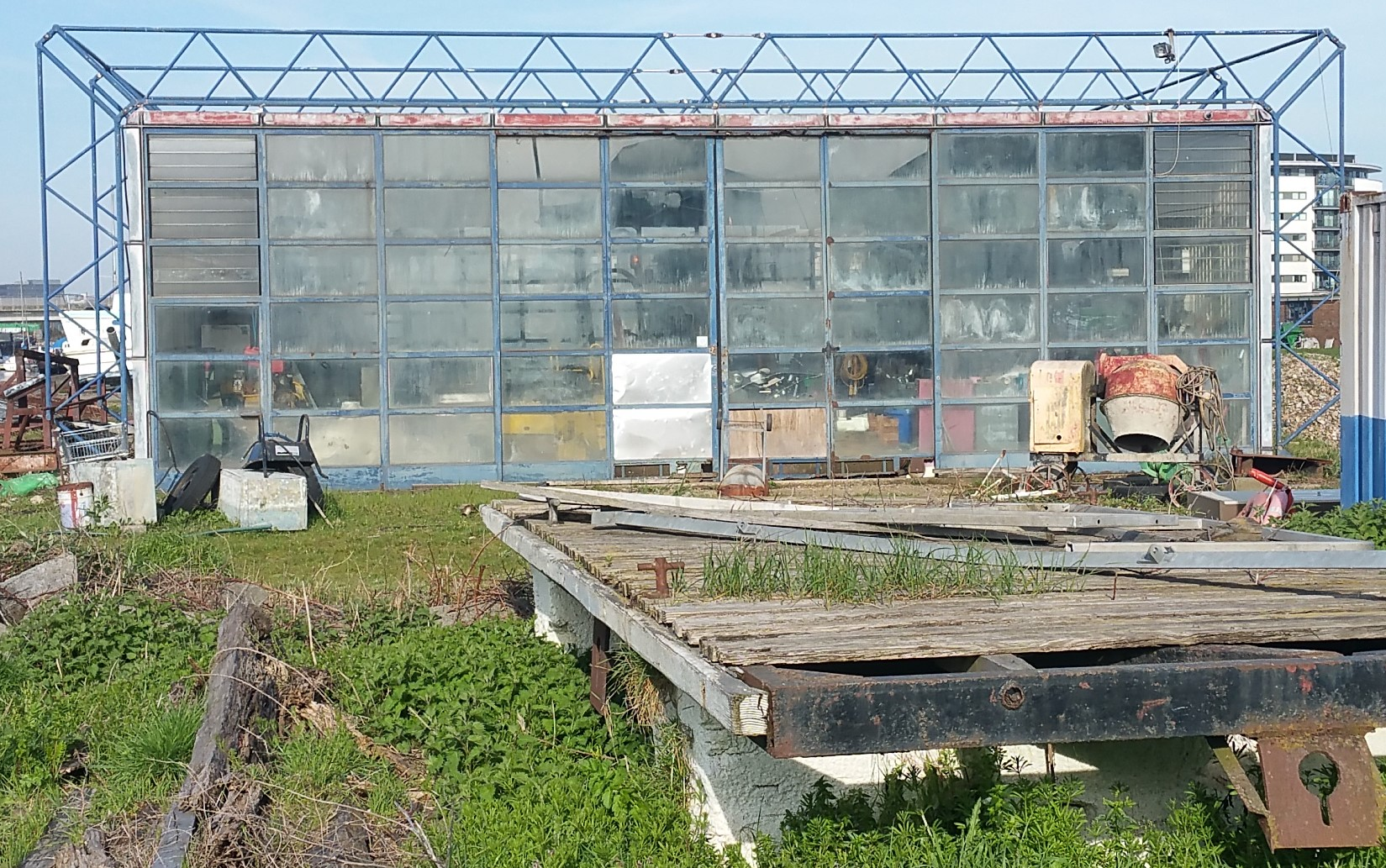
Patera Building original prototype in the Docklands area of East London (2020)

Dismantlement of the building in its Albert Island location started in Autumn 2021, but then for over a year, the building was left in a semi-dismantled state pending the decision, made in April 2022, not to list the building. Further, requests made to DCMS for a review of the Historic England decision were denied in October 2022, leaving the decision (not to list) to stand.

In April 2025, the Patera Building prototype was added to the C20 Society's Risk List 2025 as being under threat of demolition. "Although many High-Tech buildings have belied their original intentions of flexibility and adaptability, remaining resolutely static and unchanging since construction, the Patera has already moved thrice in its 43-year lifespan. Its current sad, skeletal appearance, a 'noble ruin', might suggest the structure is a lost cause, but reimagining it anew would be a fitting continuation for this unlikely survivor."

In December 2025, the Gallions Point site, where the Patera Building prototype stands in the Royal Docks area, was identified as the potential site for relocation of New Billingsgate and New Smithfield markets. In readiness for the planning stages for this scheme which is expected to conclude in 2028 at the earliest, a Certificate of Immunity was granted by Historic England in July 2026 to prevent listing of the building for a period of five years.
