= Ulstein =

Ulstein may refer to:

== Business ==
- Ulstein Group, a group of various marine-related industries, mainly known for shipbuilding and design
- Ulstein Verft, a Norwegian shipyard

== Places ==
- Ulstein Municipality, a municipality in Møre og Romsdal county, Norway
- Ulstein Church, a church in Ulstein Municipality in Møre og Romsdal county, Norway

== People ==
- Dag Inge Ulstein (born 1980), a Norwegian politician for the Christian Democratic Party
- Gunvor Ulstein (born 1969), a Norwegian businesswoman
- Idar Ulstein (1934–2012), a Norwegian businessman
- Ragnar Ulstein (1920–2019), a Norwegian journalist, writer, and resistance member
- Tore Ulstein (born 1967), a Norwegian businessman
