= Tonnesen =

Tonnesen or Tønnesen is a Norwegian surname that may refer to

- Ambrosia Tønnesen (1859-1948), Norwegian sculptor
- Beatrice Tonnesen (1871–1958), American artist and photographer
- Carl M. Rynning-Tønnesen (1924–2013), Norwegian police chief
- Christian Rynning-Tønnesen (born 1959), Norwegian businessman
- Grethe Tønnesen, Norwegian handball player
- Kent Robin Tønnesen (born 1991), Norwegian handball player
- Pau Tonnesen (born 1992), Spanish decathlete
- Sverre Rynning-Tønnesen (1894–1970), Norwegian electrical engineer and civil servant
- Terje Tønnesen (born 1955), Norwegian violinist

== See also ==
- Tønnesen Glacier in Antarctica
