= Bård Mikkelsen =

Norwegian businessperson (born 1948)

Bård Martin Mikkelsen (born 31 May 1948) is a Norwegian businessperson. He has been the chief executive officer of Widerøe (1988–1997), the Ulstein Group (1997–1999), Oslo Energi Holding (1999–2001) and Statkraft (2001–2010).

== Biography ==
He was born in Oslo, but grew up in Sarpsborg, in the neighborhood Hafslund. His father spent his career in the company Hafslund. Bård Mikkelsen took his education at the Befalsskolen for Kavaleriet and Norwegian Military Academy, and worked in the Norwegian Army, among others in Hærens Fallskjermjegerskole. As a continuation of this he has been an active skydiver, and in 1986 he became an instructor in tandem skydiving. His last dive was in 1994 over Antarctica. He left the military in 1977, and became a sales engineer in Raufoss Ammunisjonsfabrikker. The next year he became "personal director" in Norzink in Odda. He was later promoted to assisting director. In 1984 he became director of DnC's department in Gjøvik. In line with his new civil career, he took education at the Norwegian School of Management, and also went through the executive programme at INSEAD in 1986.

In 1988 he became the CEO of Widerøe. One of the first things to occur in Mikkelsen's period in Widerøe was the disastrous Widerøe Flight 710 crash. The Widerøe Flight 839 crash occurred in 1990, and the Widerøe Flight 744 crash occurred in 1993. He remained in Widerøe for almost a decade, but in November 1996 it was announced that he would take over as the CEO of the Ulstein Group in February 1997. He also succeeded Idar Ulstein as chairman of the board in Ulstein Verft, Ulstein Propeller, Ulstein Bergen and Ulstein Brattvaag. He remained in Ultsein until 1999, and from 1999 to 2001 he was the CEO of Oslo Energi Holding. In September 2001 he succeeded Lars Uno Thulin as CEO of Statkraft. He has also been chairman of Store Norske Spitsbergen Kulkompani and a board member of E.ON and Cermaq.

In November 2009 Mikkelsen announced his intention to leave Statkraft in the summer of 2010. He will be replaced by Christian Rynning-Tønnesen. Rynning-Tønnesen will get an annual salary of 3.9 million kr, 0.4 million more than the salary of Mikkelsen. Mikkelsen's salary was already the highest salary for a leader in a state-owned company in Norway. As late as 2004 his salary was much lower; 2.2 million.

== Personal life ==
He resides in Hosle. He is married and has four children. In addition to parachuting, Mikkelsen has been practising mountain climbing, diving, kiting, snowboarding, helicopter flying and motocross. He practiced speed skating, ski jumping and cycling in his young days.

Business positions
| Preceded by Peter L. Nissen | CEO of Widerøe; 1988–1997 | Succeeded by Per Arne Watle |
