= Peter Nissen =

Peter Nissen may refer to:

- Peter L. Nissen (1924–2024), Norwegian aviator and businessman
- Peter Norman Nissen (1871–1930), Canadian-American-British mining engineer, inventor and army officer
