= Leif Larsson =

Leif Larsson may refer to:

- Leif Larsson (sport shooter)
- Leif Larsson (speedway rider)

== See also ==
- Leif Larsen (disambiguation)
