= Oluf Müller =

Oluf Müller may refer to:

- Oluf Christian Müller, Norwegian politician
- Oluf C. Müller, Norwegian civil servant
