= Gunvor Ulstein =

Norwegian businesswoman (born 1969)

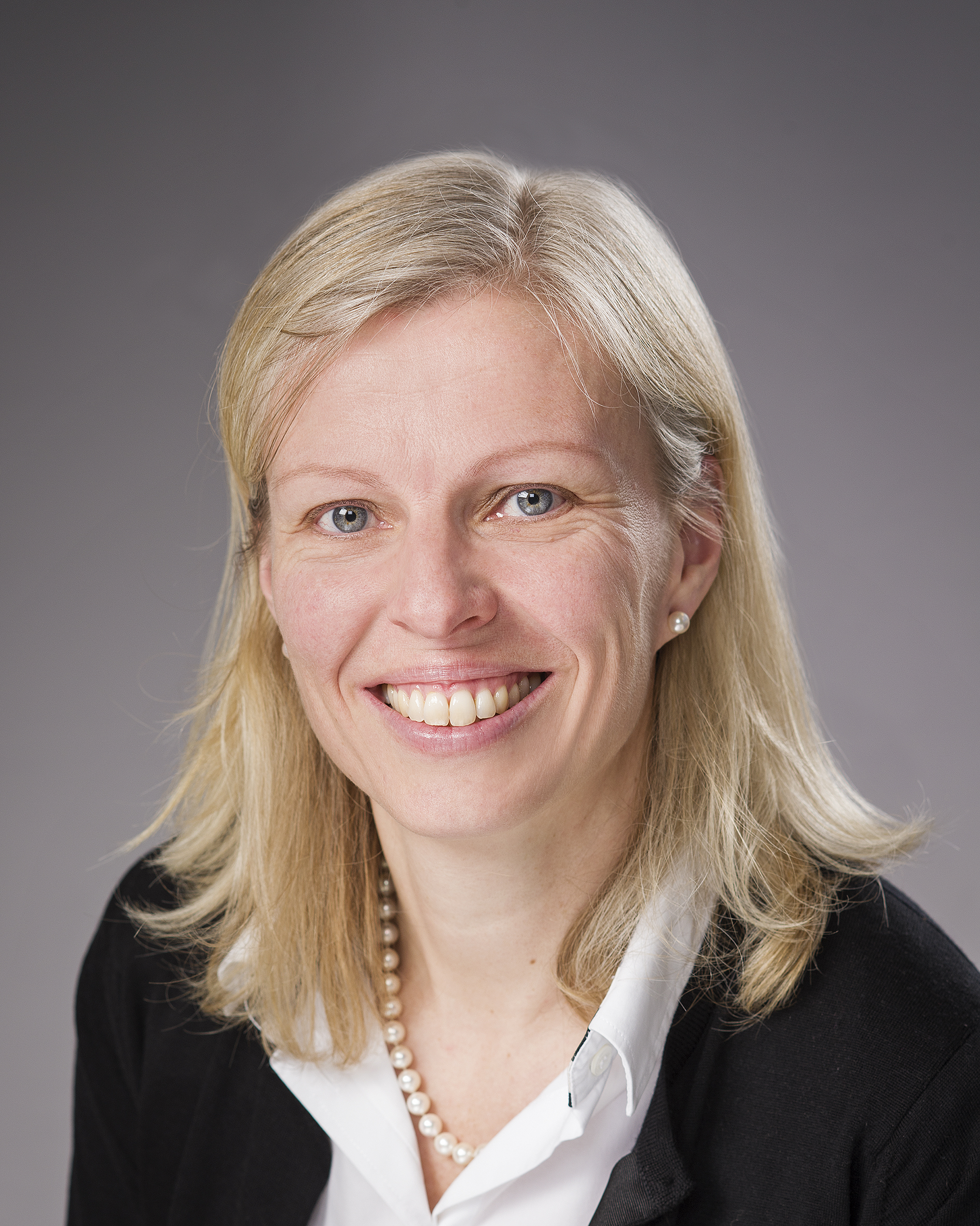
- Parent(s): Idar Ulstein
- Relatives: Tore Ulstein

Gunvor Ulstein (born June 11, 1969) is a Norwegian businesswoman, CEO of Ulstein Group, Head of the Board at Ulsmo and a number of companies in Ulstein Group, and Deputy Chair of the Board in Ulstein Group. She is a member of the Board in Hafast (Hareid Fastlandssamband), an association engaged in mainland connection from Hareid to Ålesund via Sula, a board member of SOS Children's Villages and the ÅKP-IMD Advisory Board.

Gunvor Ulstein is the daughter of the group's previous CEO, Idar Ulstein (1934-2012). She holds an MBA from the Norwegian School of Economics and Business Administration, and 1 Law Department at the University of Bergen. She started her career in 1993-1994 as a trainee at Columbia Shipanagement in Cyprus, worked as a market analyst 1994-1997, and was a sales manager at the engine factory Ulstein Bergen (1997–1999). She was appointed managing director of Ulstein Verft in March 1999. She became CEO in 2003, a position she held to 2020. She returned as CEO in 2023.

Gunvor Ulstein is also head of the subsidiary Ulstein Shipping. She is also the sole owner and manager of the company Mogul Invest, which is co-owner of Ulsmo AS, the largest owner of the Ulstein Group.

Previously, she has been the deputy head of the board of NRK, head of the board of Hafast, Member of the Advisory Board of NHH, Member of the Advisory Board of Nor-Shipping, deputy head of the board of the Council of Det Norske Veritas (DNV), a member of Trade and Industry Minister's Council for Maritime Development (MARUT), a member of the Supervisory Council of Norges Bank, a board member of Eksportfinans (2003–2007), member of the Executive Board of the Teknologibedriftenes Landsforening (now: Norsk Industri), deputy head of the board of NHO Møre og Romsdal, a member of the Strategy Group in Maritim 21, a member of the Executive Board of GCE Blue Maritime Cluster, and the Labour Immigrant Committee appointed by the Solberg government.

In 2006, she was voted Businesswoman of the year by Veuve Clicquot, the champagne manufacturer. In 2008, she was appointed Shipping Name of the Year by WISTA. She was appointed Young Person in Shipping Award 2011 by Seatrade Awards (handed out by Princess Anne), and received Tekna's Gold Medal in 2013. The Medal is given as an honour and encouragement to Norwegian managers or companies for outstanding efforts in creating new opportunities for Norwegian technologists, both in Norway and internationally.
