= Lars Uno Thulin =

Norwegian engineer, civil servant and politician

Lars Uno Thulin (25 March 1939 – 14 March 2002) was a Norwegian engineer, civil servant and politician for the Labour Party.

He was born in Uddevalla, Sweden, but grew up in Fredrikstad. He studied at the Norwegian Institute of Technology where he took a siv.ing. degree. He later took a doctorate in thermodynamics.

From 1975 to 1976 he was a part of Bratteli's Second Cabinet as a State Secretary in the Ministry of Church and Education. From 1976 to 1977 in Nordli's Cabinet he was a State Secretary in the Ministry of Industry. From 1977 to 1989 he worked in the bank Den norske Creditbank, from 1981 to 1989 as vice chief executive. He served as the permanent under-secretary of state in the Norwegian Ministry of Trade, the highest-ranking bureaucratic position, from 1989 to 1992. He abruptly left to become the chief executive officer of Statkraft, where he stayed until 2001.

Civic offices
Preceded by Oluf C. Müller	Permanent under-secretary of state in the Norwegian Ministry of Trade; 1989–1992	Succeeded by ?? (acting)
Business positions
Preceded by Gunnar Vatten	Chief executive officer of Statkraft; 1992–2001	Succeeded by Bård Mikkelsen
