= Rolf Moe =

Norwegian engineer and civil servant (1917–1999)

Rolf Moe (24 September 1917 – 11 December 1999) was a Norwegian engineer and civil servant.

He was born in Oslo, and took the siv.ing. degree at the Norwegian Institute of Technology in 1943. He worked in Oslo and Trondheim before working as manager of Narvik Kommunale Elektrisitetsverk in Narvik and in Midt-Helgeland Kraftlag in Mosjøen. He was then a chief engineer in Skiensfjordens Kommunale Kraftselskap and Norske Elektrisitetsverkers Forening. He was the director of electricity in the Norwegian Water Resources and Electricity Agency from 1965 to 1971. He was succeeded by Gunnar Vatten. From 1971 to 1984 Moe was the chief executive officer of NEMKO.

He was president in the Norwegian Electrotechnical Committee, was a supervisory council member in Sira-Kvina Kraftselskap, financial committee member in the International Electrotechnical Commission and treasurer in the IECEE (International Commission on the Rules for the Approval of Electrical Equipment).

He resided in Finstadbru. He died in December 1999 and was buried in Aurskog.
