= Liddell hut =

The Liddell hut was a prefabricated dormitory, of which thousands were manufactured during the First World War. Its inventor was one Lt. Col Guy Liddell (1868–1954), of Palmers Green House, Hatch Beauchamp, Taunton, Somerset.

The patent reads:

438,911. Portable huts. Liddell, G., Aug. 30, 1934, No. 25020. [Class 20 (i)] A collapsable [sic] portable hut comprises gabled end-walls of hinged panels, side-walls longitudinally-divided, roofpanels and roofcap, and rigid seats or bunks extending along the sidewalls and hinged to the lower portions thereof. The panels are formed of wooden frameworks [b] and composition board, and in the end-walls are hinged together by hinges [c], one panel in one wall constituting a door [d], and one panel in the other wall constituting a window [f], beneath which is hinged a table [g]. The end-walls are bolted to the side-walls by means of bolts and wing-nuts [m], and the side-walls are each formed in two portions, the lower portion [j] being hinged to the bunk framework [u] and the upper portion is adapted to stand on the lower portion. The bunks [u] are provided with claws [v] adapted to be received in slots provided in the framing of the end-walls, and are further supported by struts [w] hinged to the bunks and adapted to be turned down to contact with the floor of the hut. The roof, Fig. 4, is formed by inclined roof panels [n] and a roof cap [o], each provided with pin fittings [t] to enter holes in the hut frame members.

Liddell was also known as a good amateur portrait painter.

== See also ==
- Nissen hut
- Quonset hut
