= Nissen hut =

Prefabricated steel hut

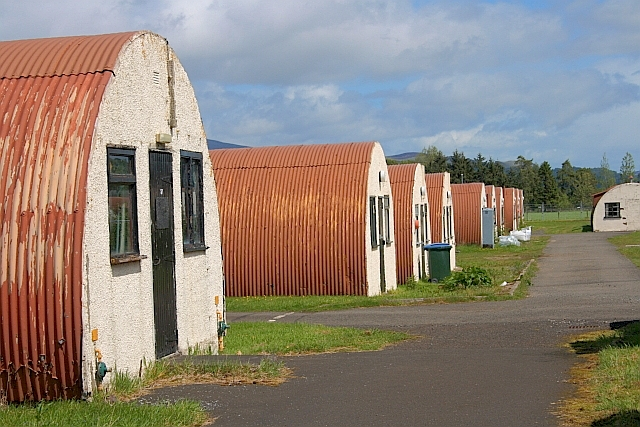
Nissen huts, Cultybraggan Camp, close to Comrie, in west Perthshire

A Nissen hut is a prefabricated steel structure originally for military use, especially as barracks, made from a 210° portion of a cylindrical skin of corrugated iron placed over a steel and wood frame. It was designed during the First World War by Major Peter Norman Nissen in Britain. It was also used extensively during the Second World War and was adapted as the similar Quonset hut in the United States.

== Description ==
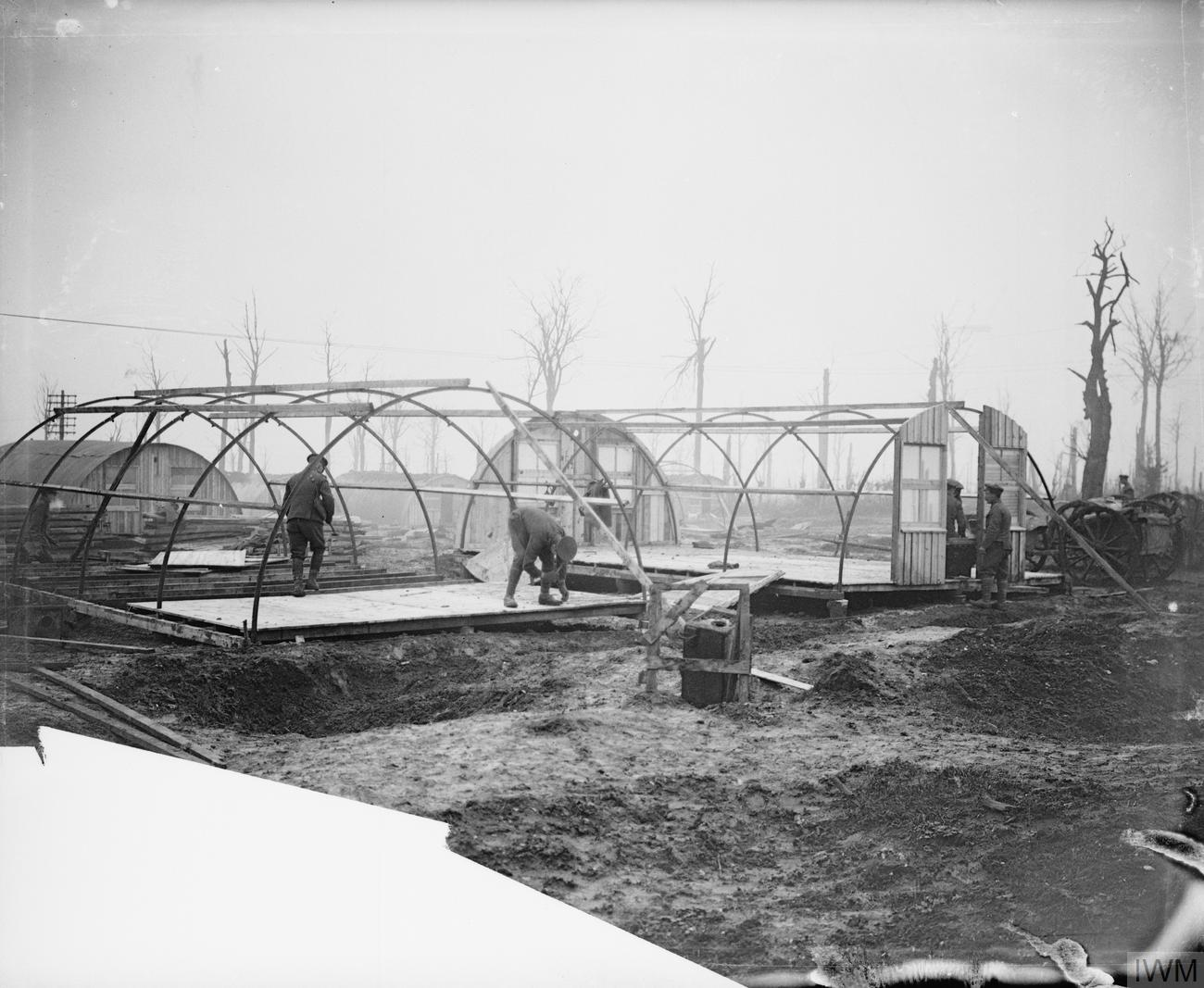
British troops erecting Nissen huts near Bazentin, November 1916

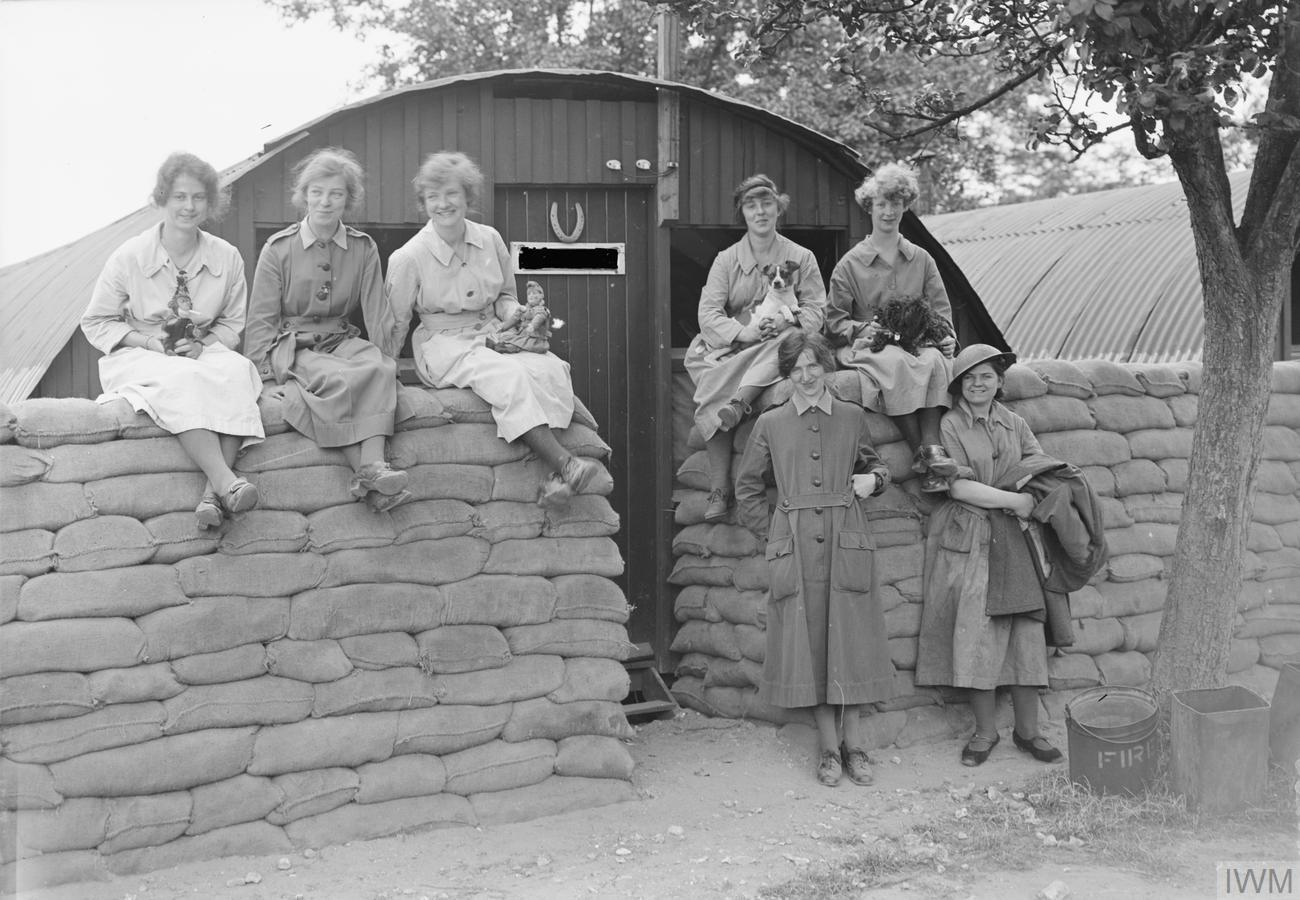
Members of the Queen Mary's Army Auxiliary Corps outside their Nissen hut billets in Rouen, France, 18 June 1918. Note the wartime censorship of the sign on the door.

A Nissen hut is made from sheets of metal bent into the form of half a cylinder and set on the ground with its axis horizontal. The cross-section is slightly more than a semi-circle so that the bottom of the hut curves inwards slightly. The exterior is formed from curved corrugated steel sheets 10 feet 6 inches (320 cm) by 2 feet 2 inches (66 cm), laid with a two-corrugation lap at the side and a 6-inch (15 cm) overlap at the ends. Three sheets cover the arc of the hut. They are attached to five 3-by-2-inch (76 mm × 51 mm) wooden purlins and 3-by-2-inch (76 mm × 51 mm) wooden spiking plates at the ends of the floor joists.

The purlins are attached to eight T-shaped ribs (1 3/4 by 1 3/4 by 1/8 inch [44.5 mm × 44.5 mm × 3.2 mm]) set at 6-foot (1.8 m) centres. Each rib consists of three sections bolted together using splice plates, and each end is bolted to the floor at the bearers. With each rib are two straining wires, one on each side, and a straining ratchet (or in some cases a simple fencing-wire strainer). The wires are strained during construction. The straining wires do not appear in the original Nissen patent.

The purlins are attached to the ribs using a "hook" bolt, which hooks through a pre-drilled hole in the rib and is secured into the purlin. The hook bolt is a unique feature of the Nissen design.

Interior lining could be horizontal corrugated steel or material like hardboard attached to the ribs. Sometimes corrugated asbestos cement sheeting was used. If required, the space between the lining and the exterior may be used for insulation and services.

The walls and floors rest on foundations consisting of 4-by-4-inch (10 by 10 cm) stumps with 15-by-9-inch (38 by 23 cm) sole plates. On these are 4-by-3-inch (10.2 by 7.6 cm) bearers and 4-by-2-inch (10.2 by 5.1 cm) joists at 34-inch (86 cm) centres. The floor is made from tongue-and-groove floorboards.

At each end the walls are made from a wooden frame with weatherboards nailed to the outside.

Windows and doors may be added to the sides by creating a dormer form by adding a frame to take the upper piece of corrugated iron and replacing the lower piece with a suitable frame for a door or window.

Nissen huts come in three internal spans (diameters)—16 ft (4.9 m), 24 ft (7.3 m), and 30 ft (9.1 m). The longitudinal bays come in multiples of 6 ft (1.8 m), allowing the length of the cylinder to be any multiple of that.

The corrugated steel half-circles used to build Nissen huts can be stored efficiently because the curved sheets can be cupped one inside another. However, there is no standard model of Nissen hut, because the design was never static and changed according to demand.

== History ==
Between 16 and 18 April 1916, Major Peter Norman Nissen of the 29th Company Royal Engineers of the British Army began to experiment with hut designs. Nissen, a mining engineer and inventor, constructed three prototype semi-cylindrical huts. The semi-cylindrical shape was derived from the drill-shed roof at Queen's University, Kingston, Ontario (collapsed 1896). Nissen's design was subject to intensive review by his fellow officers, Lieutenant Colonels Shelly, Sewell, and McDonald, and General Clive Gerard Liddell (Note: Not to be confused with Lt.-Col. Guy Liddell, no relation, who designed the Liddell Hut.), who helped Nissen develop the design. After the third prototype was completed, the design was formalized and the Nissen hut was put into production in August 1916. At least 100,000 were produced in the First World War.

Nissen patented his invention in the UK in 1916 and patents were taken out later in the United States, Canada, South Africa and Australia. Nissen received royalties from the British government, not for huts made during the war, but only for their sale after the conflict. Nissen received some £13,000 and was awarded the Distinguished Service Order (DSO).

Two factors influenced the design of the hut. First, the building had to be economical in its use of materials, especially considering wartime shortages of building material. Second, the building had to be portable. This was particularly important in view of the wartime shortages of shipping space. This led to a simple form that was prefabricated for ease of erection and removal. The Nissen hut could be packed in a standard Army wagon and erected by six men in four hours. The record for erection is 1 hour 27 minutes.

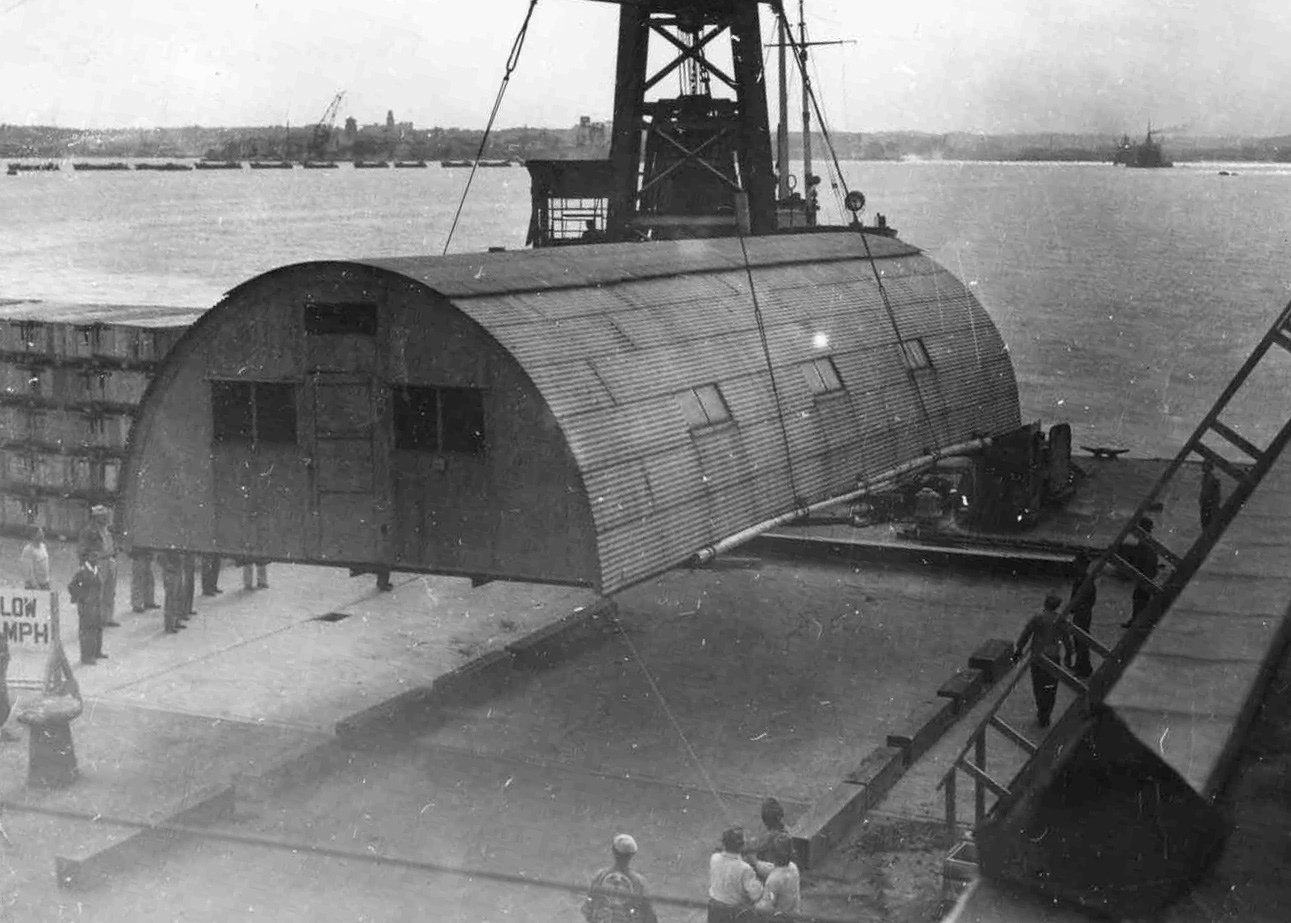
An American version of the Nissen hut known as the Quonset being erected by Army engineers

Production of Nissen huts waned between the wars, but was revived in 1939. Nissen Buildings Ltd. waived its patent rights for wartime production during the Second World War (1939–45). Similar-shaped hut types were developed as well, notably the larger Romney hut in the UK and the Quonset hut in the United States. All types were mass-produced in the thousands. The Nissen hut was used for a wide range of functions; apart from accommodation, they functioned as churches and bomb stores, among other uses. Accounts of life in the hut generally were not positive. Huts in the United Kingdom were frequently seen as cold and draughty, while those in the Middle East, Asia, and the Pacific were seen as stuffy and humid.

== Use as family housing ==
Although the prefabricated hut was conceived to meet wartime demand for accommodation, similar situations, such as construction camps, are places where prefabricated buildings are useful. The Nissen hut was adapted into a larger prefabricated two-storey house and marketed by Nissen-Petren Ltd. Four of the original prototypes survive in Queen Camel in Somerset. The standard Nissen hut was often recycled into housing. A similar approach was taken with the US Quonset hut at the end of the war, with articles on how to adapt the buildings for domestic use appearing in Home Beautiful and Popular Mechanics.

In Aultbea on Loch Ewe, in Scotland, a large Nissen hut cinema built by the Royal Navy was donated to the village after the Second World War, and remains in use as a community hall. Nissen hut houses survive in Hvalfjörður, Iceland. They were built to house naval personnel during the war.

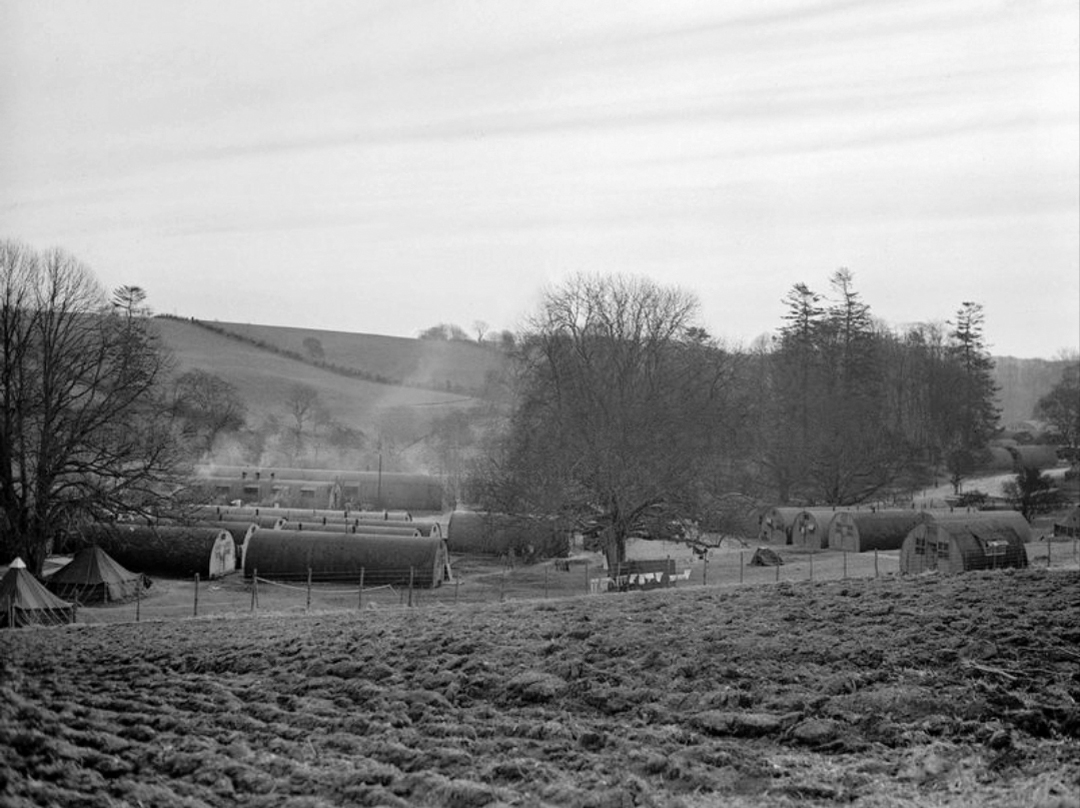
Nissen huts were used as US military forces accommodation at Mount Panther, Northern Ireland, during the Second World War

However, the adaptation of the semi-cylindrical hut to non-institutional uses was not popular. Neither the Nissen nor the Quonset developed into popular housing, despite their low cost. One reason was the association with huts: a hut was not a house, with all the status a house implies. The second point was that rectangular furniture does not fit into a curved-wall house very well, and, thus, the actual usable space in a hut might be much less than supposed.

In the UK, after the Second World War many were converted for agricultural or industrial purposes, and numerous examples have since been demolished. Many Nissen huts survived on former Army and Air Force camps as temporary housing to over 150,000 Polish soldiers and civilians displaced after the war as part of the Polish Resettlement Corps set up in 1947.

In Pune, India, some Nissen huts were provided to persons who lost their homes due to floods caused by the Panshet Dam burst in 1961. Some of these huts are still occupied and in use as homes.

== Use in Australia ==
In Australia, after the war, Nissen huts were erected at many migrant camps around the country.

Most postwar Nissen huts were used by governments. However, there is one block that was built as private housing. Fifty Nissen huts were constructed in Belmont North, a suburb of Newcastle, New South Wales, Australia. They were designed to provide cheap, ready-made housing for post-war British migrant families. Seventeen of the huts have been demolished over the years, but the remainder have been refurbished, improved, and extended and remain popular with their owners. Attempts to have the remaining huts heritage listed in 2009 failed in the face of opposition from some owners.

The story of Western Australia's post-War migrants has been marked with the state heritage-listing of the remaining parts of the former Main Roads Migrant Camp in Narrogin, Western Australia. The camp housed European migrants who had been displaced by the war and resettled in Western Australia, then employed in road construction. The Australian Government worked with the United Nations to accept, resettle, and provide employment for many thousands of Europeans after the Second World War.

Immigrants were housed in Nissen huts at Holmesglen, in south east Melbourne until the early 1970s when they were demolished to make way for native parklands. A unique example still exists along nearby High Street Road in Ashwood where the hut is occupied by a bottle shop.

Main Roads was one of three migrant camps set up in Narrogin in the late 1940s and used until the mid-1950s. The camp's conditions were basic, with migrants living in tents and Nissen huts. The three Nissen huts are the only ones to survive. Post-war migrants played a vital role in the development of the state through the construction of state and local government buildings, roads and railways. Today, the place is used by Main Roads Western Australia as its Wheatbelt South Region Headquarters.

== Gallery ==
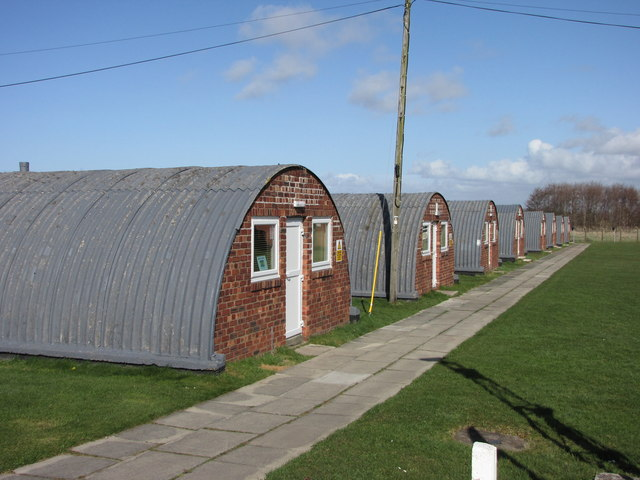
Nissen huts at Altcar Training Camp, Hightown, Merseyside, still in use in 2019. They are often used as filming locations including the 2019 Russell T Davies drama Years and Years

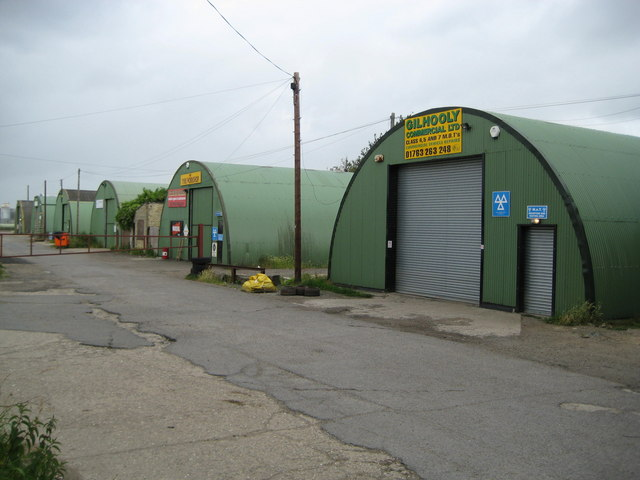
Nissen huts used as workshops, Meldreth, Cambridgeshire (2008)

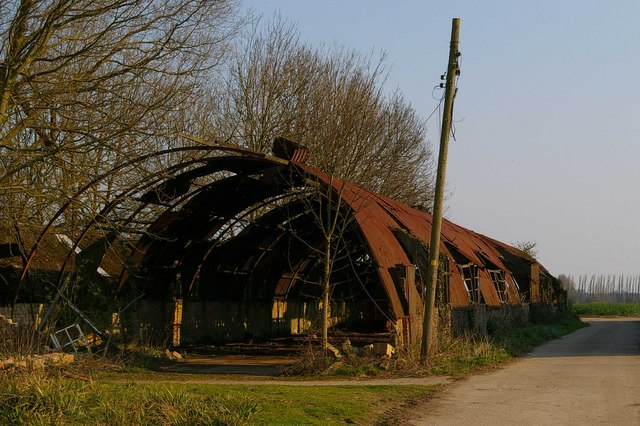
This ruined Nissen hut is on North End Place Farm, Ford End, Essex

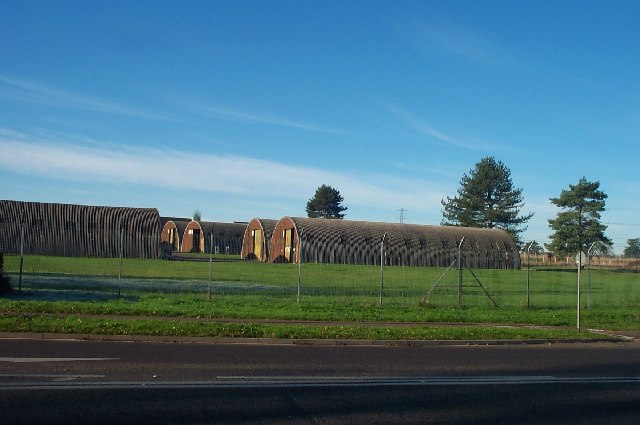
These huts were part of the old army base at Norton Fitzwarren

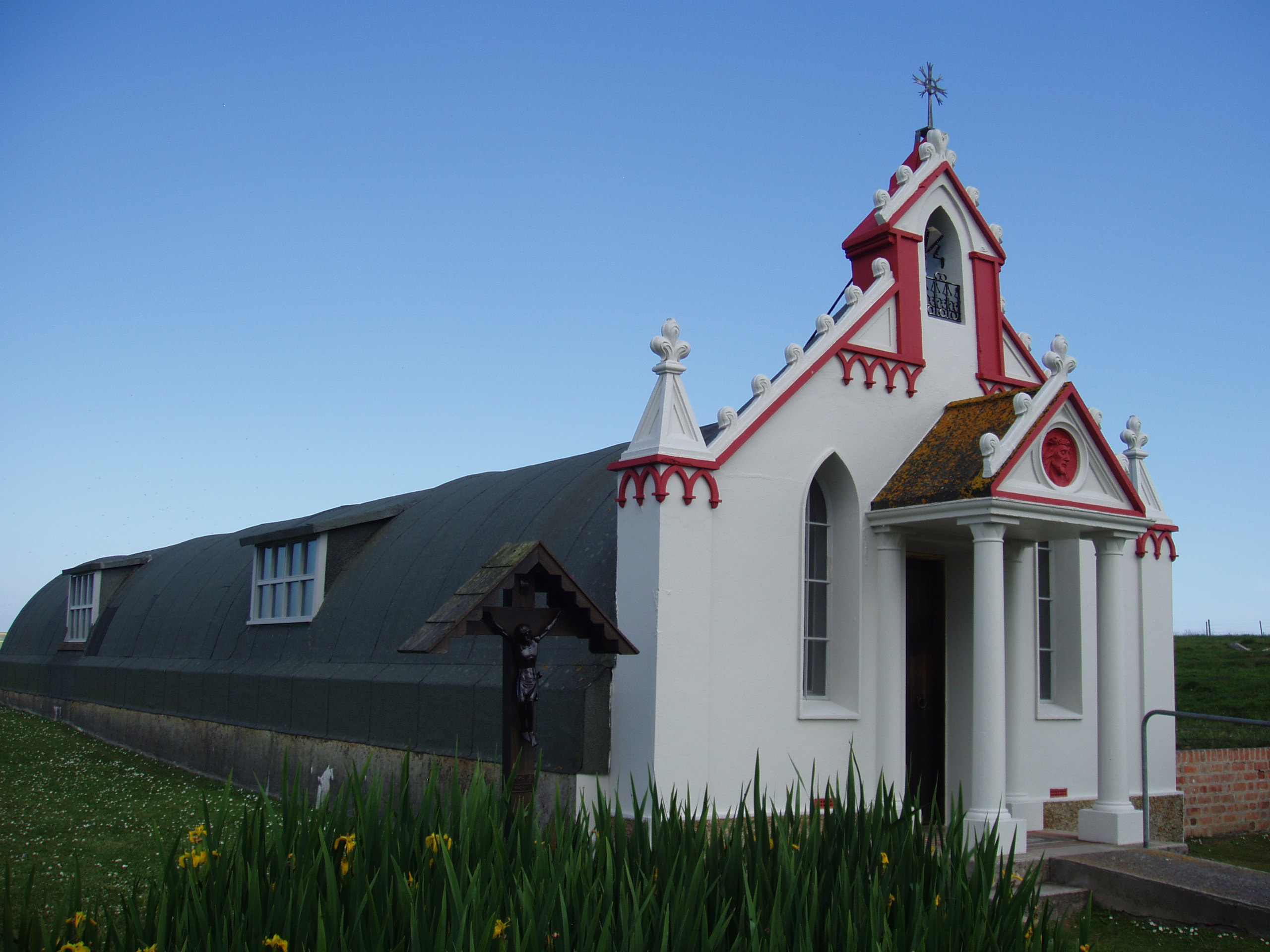
The Italian Chapel, built by Italian PoWs on Lamb Holm, Orkney

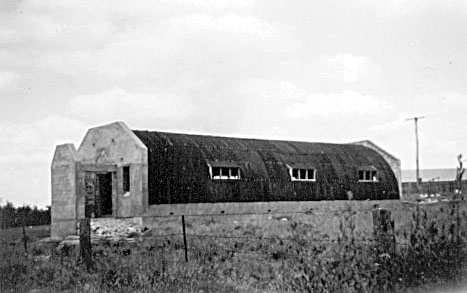
Nissen hut in Port Lincoln, South Australia, in the process of being converted into the John Calvin Presbyterian Church in the early 1950s. It was demolished in the late 1960s

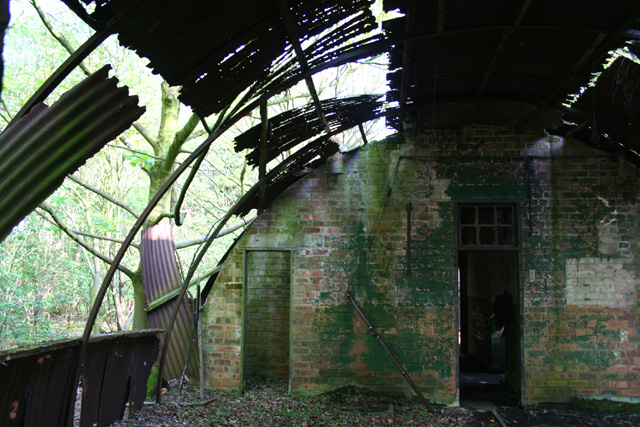
Derelict Nissen hut interior; the corrugated iron sheets forming the walls and roof are supported by brick partition walls and metal girders

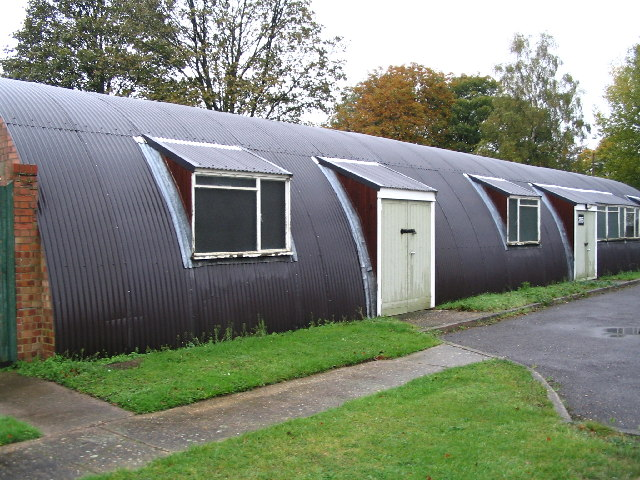
This was probably one of the original buildings at RAF Duxford and was used as the Corporals Club in 1955

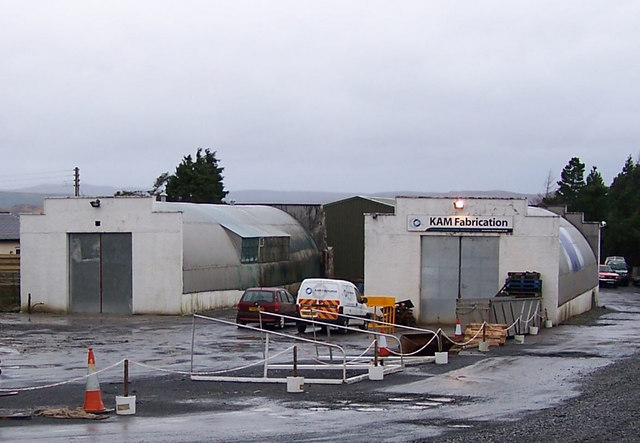
Nissen huts in use as workshops in Borve, Skye

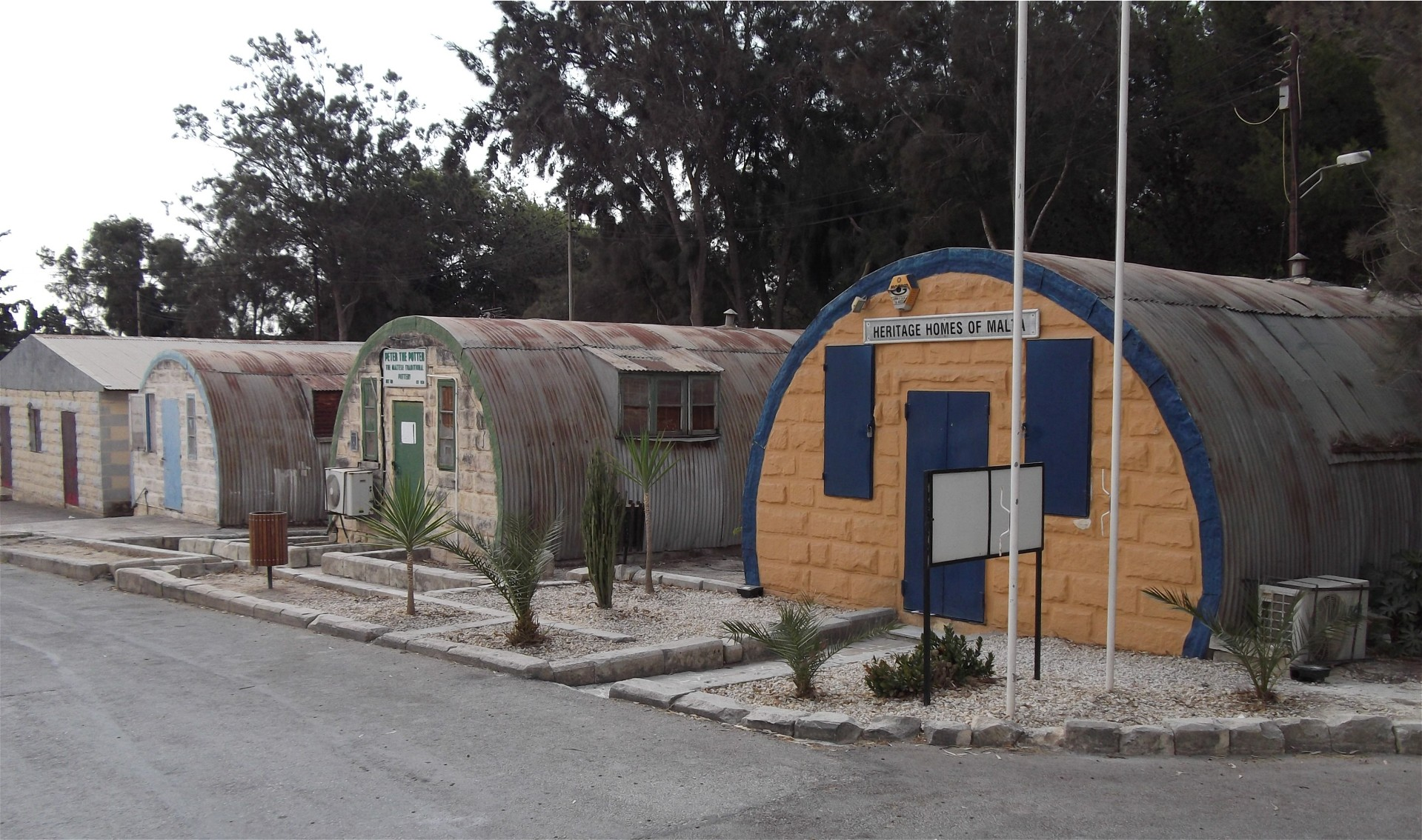
Former Nissen huts at RAF Ta Kali, Malta which now form part of a crafts village

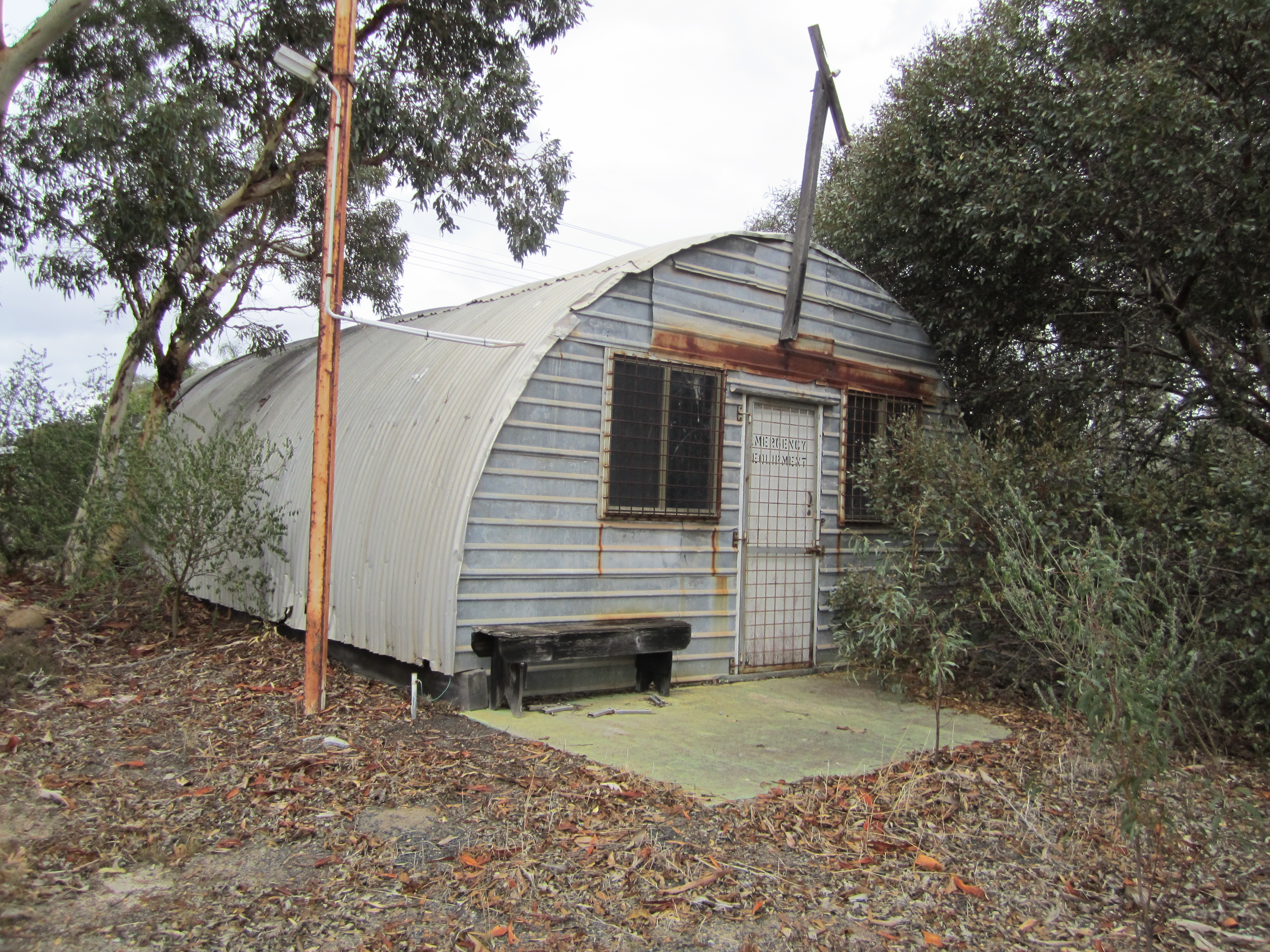
Former Main Roads Migrant Camp in Narrogin, Western Australia (exterior)

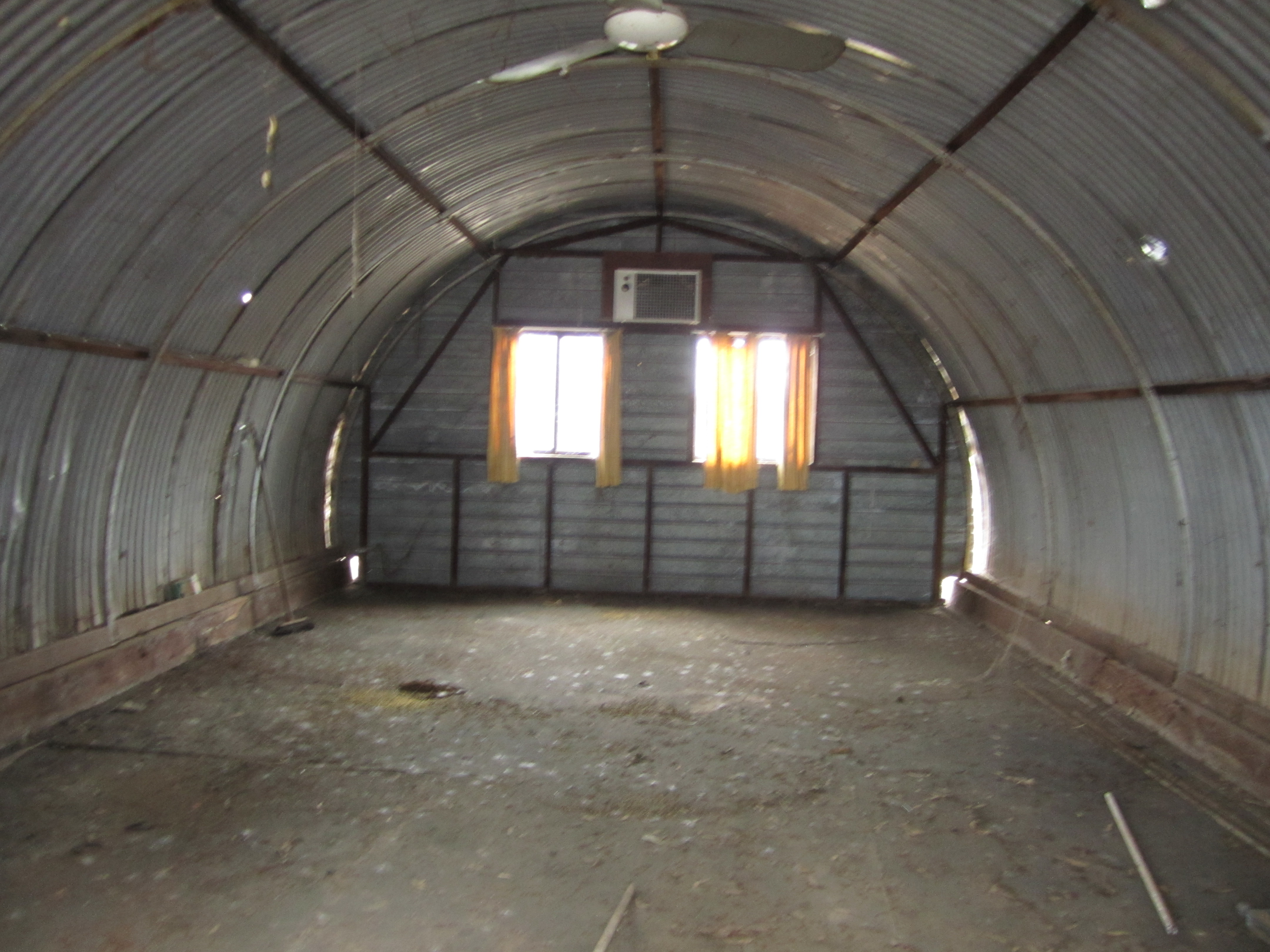
Former Main Roads Migrant Camp in Narrogin, Western Australia (interior)

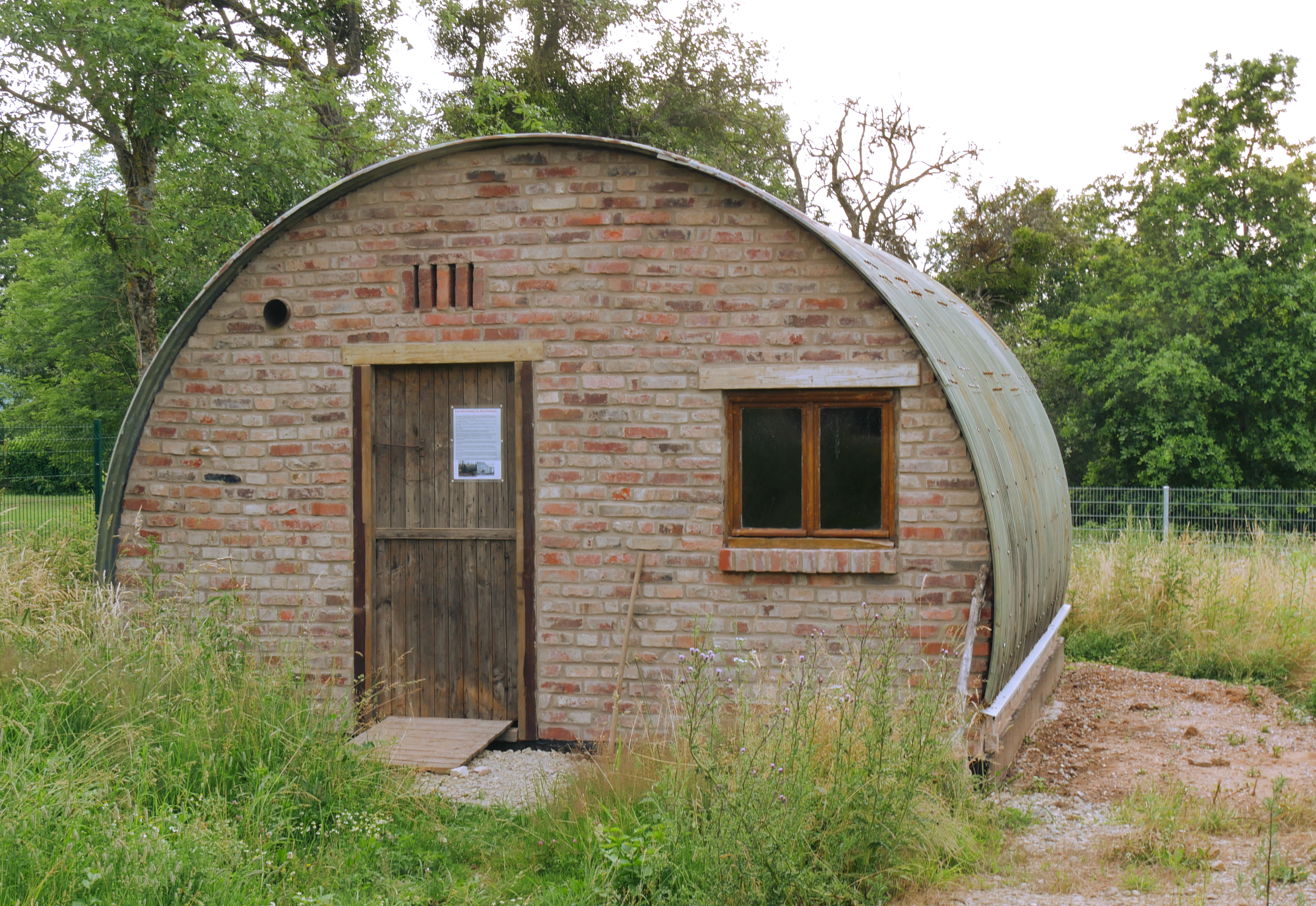
Nissen hut as an emergency shelter - Roscheider Hof Open Air Museum

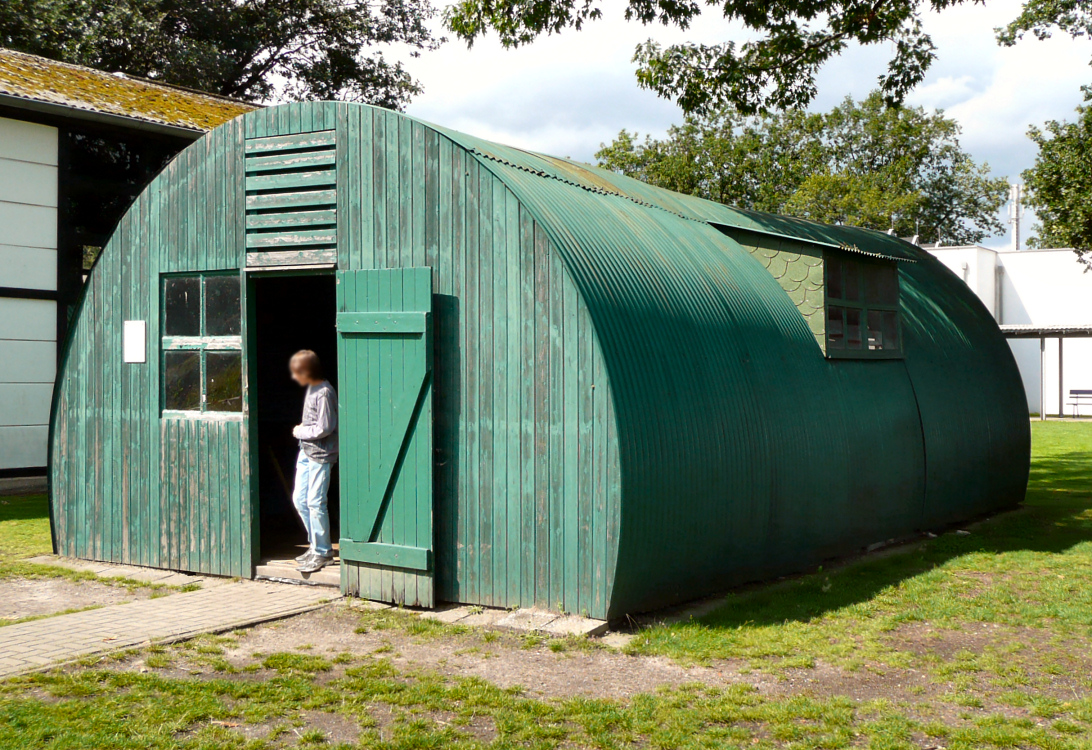
Nissen hut at the German Tank Museum

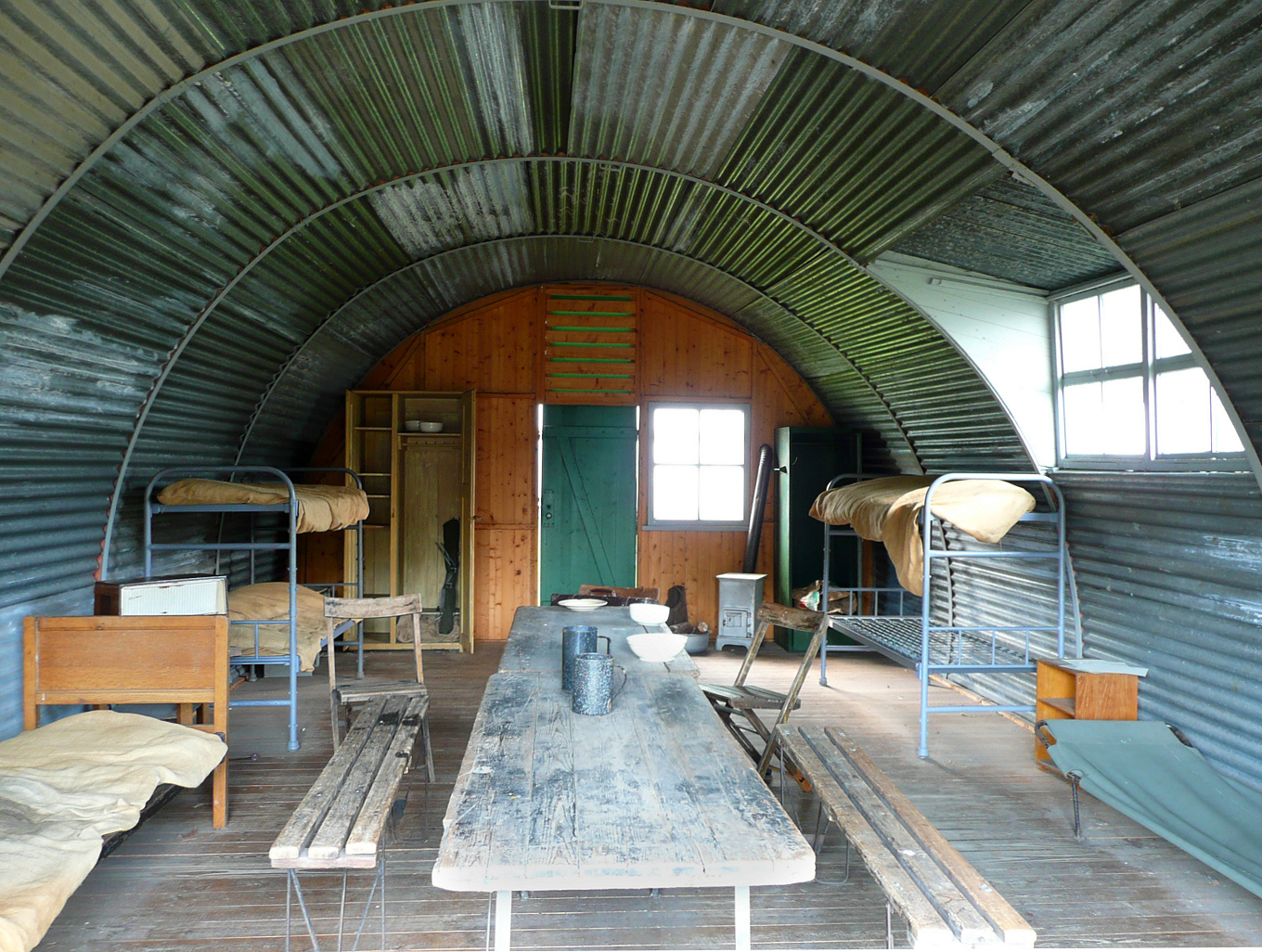
Interior of the Nissen hut at the German Tank Museum

== See also ==
- Balgownie Migrant Workers Hostel
- B hut
- Dymaxion deployment unit
- Earthquake engineering
- Iris hut
- Rubb hall
- Tin tabernacle, prefabricated churches made from corrugated galvanised steel
- Patera Building

== Bibliography ==
- Engineer in Chief (Army). 1966. Handbook of Nissen Huts: 16′0″ and 24′0″ Span, issued December 1944, Revised March 1966 Army Code No 14867. (Probably a British Army publication.)
- Francis, P. 1996. British Military Airfield Architecture: from Airships to the Jet Age. Yeovil: Patrick Stephens Limited.
- Innes, G. B. 1995. British Airfield Buildings of the Second World War. Earl Shinton: Midland Publishing Limited
- Innes, G. B. 2000. British Airfield Buildings Volume 2: The Expansion & Inter-War Periods. Hersham: Midland Publishing.
- McCosh, F. 1997 Nissen of the Huts: A biography of Lt Col. Peter Nissen, DSO. Bourne End: B D Publishing.
- Pullar, M. 1997. Prefabricated WWII Structures in Queensland. Report to National Trust of Queensland.
- Stuart, I. M. 2005. "Of the Hut, I bolted: A preliminary account of prefabricated semi-cylindrical huts in Australia". Historic Environment, Vol. 19 (1):51–56.
- Huxley, John (March 14, 2009). "History goes full semi-circle to save Nissen Town". Sydney Morning Herald.
- Draper, Karey Lee (September 2017). Wartime huts: The Development, Typology and Identification of Temporary Military Buildings in Britain 1914–1945 (PDF) (PhD). University of Cambridge.
