= Gunnar Vatten =

Norwegian engineer (1927–2011)

Gunnar Vatten (9 August 1927 – 20 July 2011) was a Norwegian engineer and civil servant.

He was born in Bodø, and took the siv.ing. degree in electrical engineering in Denmark. He was employed in the Norwegian Water Resources and Electricity Agency from 1953 to 1955, and then worked as a consultant in Nordland County Municipality before working for the Western Electric Company in Oklahoma.

He returned to Norway and was the director of electricity in the agency from 1971 to 1978, succeeding Rolf Moe. He was then a deputy under-secretary of state in the Norwegian Ministry of Petroleum and Energy from 1978 to 1985. When Statkraft was split from the Water Resources and Electricity Agency in 1986, Vatten became the chief executive officer. He left on 1 March 1992 and was replaced by Lars Uno Thulin. He was the chair of Kommunekraft from 1993.

He resided in Nesodden Municipality, was married and had children. He died in July 2011.

Business positions
New office	Chief executive officer of Statkraft	Succeeded by Lars Uno Thulin
