= Leif Larsen (disambiguation) =

Leif Larsen (1906–1990) was a Norwegian sailor.

Leif Larsen may also refer to:

- Leif Larsen (politician) (1898–1978), Norwegian politician, mayor of Bærum
- Leif Larsen (1903–1945), who later took the name Leif Larsen Tronstad, Norwegian chemist and resistance member
- Leif Larsen (cyclist) (born 1942), Danish cyclist
- Leif Holger Larsen (1954–2015), Norwegian diplomat
- Leif Larsen (American football) (born 1975), Norwegian athlete, NFL player and pro boxer
