= Widerøe Flight 744 =

1993 aviation accident in Norway

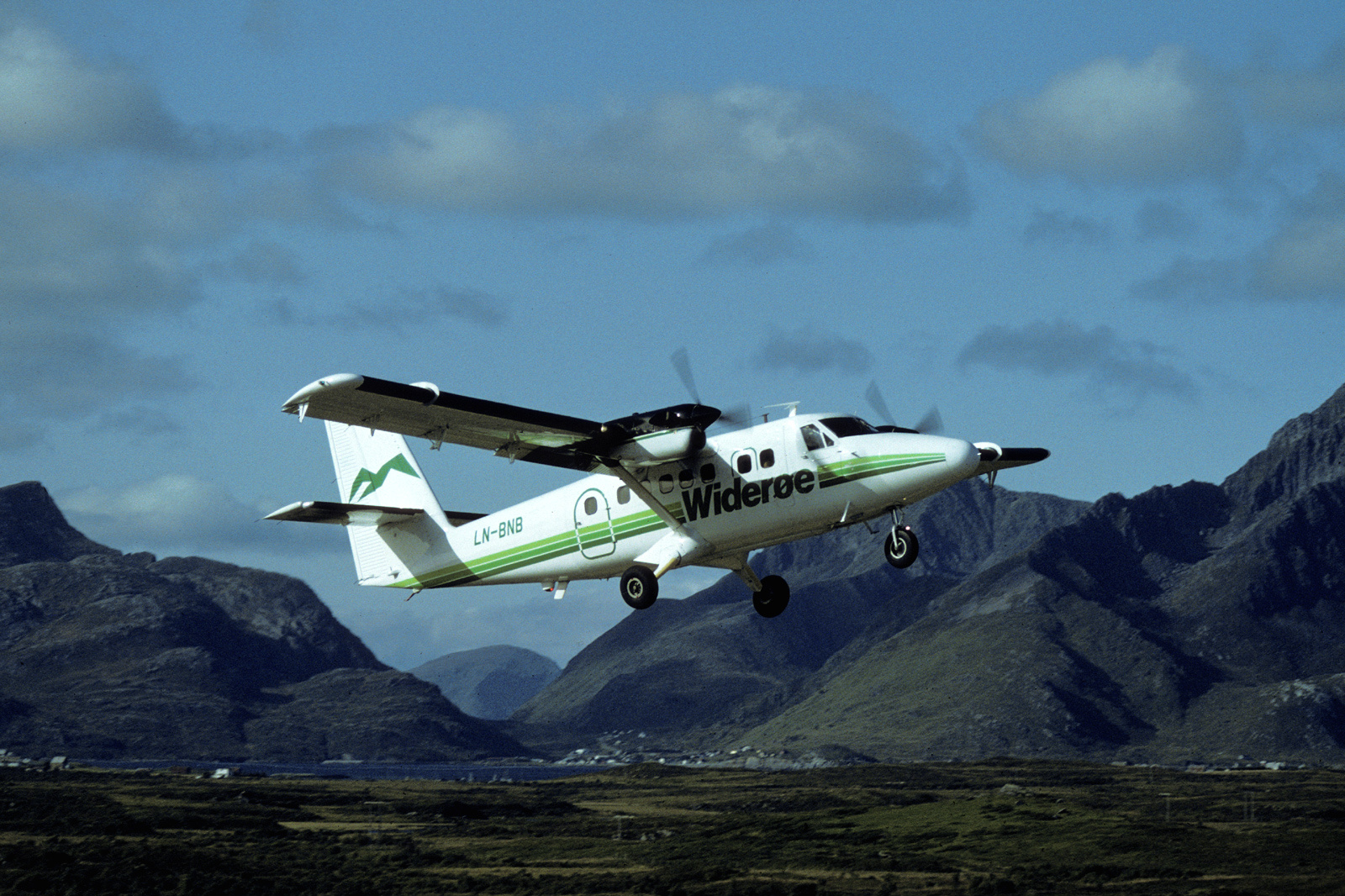
- A Widerøe DHC-6, similar to the aircraft involved

Accident
- Date: 27 October 1993
- Summary: Controlled flight into terrain due to pilot error
- Site: Berg, Overhalla Municipality, Norway; 64°29′20″N 11°42′30″E

Aircraft
- Aircraft type: de Havilland Canada DHC-6-300 Twin Otter
- Operator: Widerøe
- Registration: LN-BNM
- Flight origin: Trondheim Airport, Værnes
- Destination: Namsos Airport, Høknesøra
- Occupants: 19
- Passengers: 17
- Crew: 2
- Fatalities: 6
- Injuries: 13
- Survivors: 13

Widerøe Flight 744, also known as the Namsos Accident (Norwegian: Namsos-ulykken), was a scheduled flight of Widerøes Flyveselskap from Trondheim Airport, Værnes, via Namsos, to Rørvik Airport, Ryumsjøen, Norway. On 27 October 1993, the de Havilland Canada DHC-6 Twin Otter serving the flight underwent a controlled flight into terrain during its approach to Namsos Airport, Høknesøra. The incident occurred at 19:16:48 and killed six of the nineteen people on board, including the crew of two. The aircraft crashed at Berg in Overhalla Municipality because it held too low an altitude.

Parallel investigations were carried out by Namdal Police District and the Accident Investigation Board for Civil Aviation (HSL). A conflict arose between the two as the latter in cooperation with the Norwegian Airline Pilots Association did not want a police investigation until after their report was finished. After two years in the courts, the police eventually gained access to evidence. The report found no technical problems with the aircraft. However, it found several pilot errors and laid a large responsibility on the airline for lack of proper organization and routines. No-one was charged after the accident, but it led to a major restructure of operations and procedures in Widerøe.

== Accident ==
Widerøe Flight 744 was a scheduled flight from Trondheim Airport, Værnes, to Namsos Airport, Høknesøra, operated with a de Havilland Canada DHC-6-300 Twin Otter. The aircraft had registration LN-BNM and serial number 408, and was delivered to Widerøe in 1974. The aircraft had flown 40,453 hours and had met all service requirements. The pilot in command, Jan Bjørstad, was 43 years old, had held a pilot's license since 1974 and had been employed in Widerøe since 1985. He had held a C certificate since 4 January 1993, and had been a pilot in command since 20 January. He had flown 4,835 hours in total and had landed 13 times at Namsos Airport in the 12 months prior to the accident. The first officer, Trond Hamre, was 34 years old, had training from the United States which had been converted to a C certificate in 1988. He had 6,354 hours of flight, of which 1,356 was in a Twin Otter. He had been a pilot in command for 3,441 hours prior to working for Widerøe, where he had been employed since 1990. He had landed 27 times at Namsos Airport in the 12 months preceding the accident.

The first officer was using a medication against back pains which was not permitted while flying. However, these had been prescribed by a physician who had training in aviation medicine. No traces of the substance were found in the pilot's body after the accident. The crew had started duty at Bodø Airport at 13:30 (Central European Time, UTC+1) and were to make a round trip to Trondheim Airport, with intermediate stops at Sandnessjøen Airport, Mosjøen Airport, Brønnøysund Airport and Rørvik Airport as Flight 711. On the way south, the crew canceled its stop at Mosjøen because of bad weather. The aircraft landed at Trondheim Airport at 17:52. The return flight was to operate as Flight 744 from Trondheim via Namsos to Rørvik, where the plane and crew were to stay overnight.

At Trondheim, 17 passengers boarded along with 136 kilograms (300 lb) of cargo. The estimated flight time to Namsos was 35 minutes. The aircraft had a maximum take-off weight of 5,675 kilograms (12,511 lb), while the aircraft took off with 5,460 kilograms (12,040 lb). Prior to departure, the ground handling agent SAS Ground Handling had calculated the passenger load and center of gravity of the passengers. When correcting after observing the seating of the passengers, the pilot in command had made a calculation mistake in which he thought the passengers did not need to move around. In reality they would have to be rearranged to meet the limits of the distribution of weight. The aircraft left Trondheim Airport at 18:37 after which it ascended to cruising height at 1,500 meters (4,900 feet). At 18:53, the QNH (altimeter setting) was confirmed by Namsos to be 1017 hPa. This gave a height reading of 1,510 and 1,500 meters (4,950 and 4,920 feet), respectively, for the pilot in command and first officer. There was 25 knots (46 km/h; 29 mph) wind from 250°, with gusts up to 36 knots (67 km/h; 41 mph).

The pilot in command then decided on the descent plan, involving an initial descent to 1,200 meters (3,900 feet), then to 900 meters (3,000 feet), before making a turn towards localizer 255. Then the aircraft should descend to 640 meters (2,100 feet) and head towards Namsos Beacon inbound. After that, minimum height was set to 640 meters (2,100 feet). At 19:01, the aerodrome flight information service (AFIS) announced new weather data: the wind had changed to 260° at 25 knots (46 km/h; 29 mph), with gusts up to 40 knots (74 km/h; 46 mph). As the crew planned to use runway 26, this would give wind directly against the craft, so the crew decided to add some height to the descent. At 19:05, the first officer stated that the descent checklist was completed, and the pilot in command started the approach checklist. At this time, both height indicators showed 1,500 metres (5,000 ft). At 19:07, the aircraft was turned to 050°.

At 19:10, the aircraft reached the approach centerline and was confirmed by Namsos AFIS at 255°. By 19:14, the aircraft had descended to 640 meters (2,100 feet) and at 19:15:13, it passed Namsos Beacon. At 19:15:30, the first officer confirmed visual contact with the field. At 19:16:35, the pilot in command stated a height of 150 meters (490 feet), confirmed by the first officer. Four seconds later, the pilot in command stated: "we should not descend any further". The aircraft then first hit some trees, located 119 meters (390 ft) above mean sea level. At 19:16:48, the aircraft hit a hill 6.15 kilometers (3.82 mi) from the airport, at Berg in Overhalla. An ELT signal was received by Namsos and a search and rescue operation was started immediately. Both pilots and four passengers were killed, while the remaining thirteen passengers were injured.

== Cause ==
The weather in the area had wind up towards 30 knots (56 km/h; 35 mph), with clouds and heavy rain, and some reports of turbulence. The aircraft was not equipped with ground proximity warning system, nor was this required. There was no requirement for the aircraft to have a flight data recorder or cockpit voice recorder (CVR), but the airline had chosen to install the latter. Interviews with the surviving passengers showed that none of them perceived that there was any problems with the flight until the sudden impact. One of the passengers was a navigation professional and could see parts of the cockpit from his seat; he was thus able to confirm some of the navigational display readings. Interviews with locals indicated that the aircraft followed a normal path.

The report from the Accident Investigation Board for Civil Aviation characterized the accident as a controlled flight into terrain. The report pointed to several errors, both from the pilots, but also systematic failures from Widerøe and the Norwegian Aviation Authority. In particular, the report commented on the lack of callouts during descent. The base turn procedure was also criticized, because the crew failed to time it correctly, ending up 14 nautical miles (26 km; 16 mi) from the airport. When the flying pilot canceled the instrument landing and changed to visual landing during darkness, he did not have sufficient visual references to the terrain. During this part of the approach, the aircraft's position was not controlled with any available navigational aids. This was in part due to both pilots focusing on extra-cockpit activity after the non-flying pilot had identified the necessary sight to the airport. The crew were not aware of their distance from the terrain; the small margins from 150 to 119 meters (492 to 390 feet) were in part caused by pilots' unawareness. The cooperation between the crew did not follow the regulations of crew resource management and seemed to have stopped after visual identification of the airfield. The airline was criticized for not having standardized an operative concept that the crew fully respected and followed.

== Aftermath ==
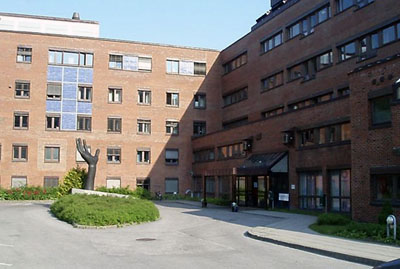
The injured were brought to Namsos Hospital

One man in his twenties was nearly unhurt in the accident and ran to the nearby farm of Berg. After saying "The aircraft has fallen down. You must call for help!", he ran back to the aircraft. The farm's three residents were the first to arrive at the site of the crash. The site was subject to sleet, rain and a southwestern wind, causing the victims to quickly freeze. Several of the wounded could not move because of fractures. The farmhouse became the base of operations for the emergency crews. The wounded were carried to the farm, where they received initial treatment before being transported to Namsos Hospital—the last arriving at 22:30. About seventy people participated in the emergency work.

The accident was the fifth fatal accident with a Twin Otter in Norway and the fourth fatal accident by Widerøe in eleven years. The company's executive management met in Bodø the evening of the accident before chief executive officer Bård Mikkelsen and others traveled to Namsos to investigate the crash site of the third fatal accident since Mikkelsen started in his position in 1988. Widerøe stopped all advertisements in the period after the accident. Widerøe announced in November that they would accelerate the replacement of their Twin Otter and de Havilland Canada Dash 7 aircraft with new de Havilland Canada Dash 8 aircraft, but denied that the accident influenced the decision and instead cited financial reasons. Widerøe's chief operating officer, Per-Helge Røbekk, announced in July 1994 that he would step down because of the strain of the three accidents.

By 1996 Widerøe had undertaken a series of operational amendments after recommendation from the commission, including a reorganization of the aircraft operation division, the quality assurance division and the company's reporting systems. Another concern was that pilots did not follow the company's routines, resulting in the company grounding about ten pilots who did not follow policy or made too many errors during observations. Some would receive additional training while others would be retired. The company would further invest 40 million Norwegian krone (equivalent to $64,000,000 in 2018) to improve safety.

The aircraft was written off after the accident. Immediately after the accident, Widerøe paid a compensation of NOK 10,000 (equivalent to $15,900 in 2018) to each of the survivors. The survivors and the deceased's next-of-kin claimed damages for several million NOK, including three people who each demanded over one million after becoming disabled. The demands were raised against the insurance company Norsk Flyforsikringspool. After mediation, the airline agreed to compensate the passengers with an additional NOK 15,000 in cash and NOK 30,000 worth of free travel with Widerøe.

== Investigation ==
Four inspectors from the HSL, two police investigators from the National Criminal Investigation Service and a technician from Widerøe arrived at the site at 13:30 on 28 October. By then flights had resumed at Namsos Airport. They secured an area of 200 by 80 meters (660 by 260 ft) for the investigation, in which all the debris of the aircraft had landed and trees had been felled by the crashing aircraft. The instrument landing system at Namsos Airport was tested by the Norwegian Aviation Authority on 28 October and 4 November, without any faults being found.

Two parallel investigations were undertaken, one by HSL and one by Namdal Police District. The latter criticized the former because they were not given access to the cockpit voice recorder (CVR). Since 1989 both the police and the prosecuting authority had not been represented in the accident investigations. HSL emphasized that they had no legal obligation to submit the tapes to the police, that the police had not asked for the tapes after Widerøe Flight 839 in 1990 and that the Ministry of Transport and Communications supported this line. The reason for the rules was that the Norwegian Airline Pilots Association did not want the records from the CVR to be used in criminal cases against pilots. The investigation board stated that they would forward any information which supported criminal violations, while Namdal Police District stated that it was necessary for an independent police investigation to identify any criminal violations. The Norwegian Data Inspectorate's director, Georg Apenes, supported the police in their request for the tapes.

The Norwegian Airline Pilots Association recommended that its members not cooperate with the police in any way, stating that "the police should sit passively and wait for the report from the commission". On 17 November the issue was brought to Parliament by the Liberal Party's Lars Sponheim, but Minister of Transport and Communications Kjell Opseth stated that he did not want to interfere. In January 1994, the police announced that they would bring six Widerøe pilots to court to force them to undergo police questioning. The six pilots were the two that piloted the previous shift on the aircraft, two that landed at Namsos Airport half an hour before the accident, and the two that had test-flown after the previous maintenance spell some days before the accident. In February, HSL started extensive investigations of the culture among pilots in Widerøe, and initiated interviews with dozens of pilots and managers in the company to investigate systematic failures in the company. Salten District Court ruled in April in favor of court questioning of the pilots. In May, the police brought the demands to receive the CVR in to Namdal District Court. A ruling was not made until December, which supported the police's demands. However, the issue was appealed by the accident board and the ministry. The issue was not resolved until August 1995, when Frostating Court of Appeal dismissed the appeal and required the tape to be handed over to the police. After the tape was handed over, both the pilots in Widerøe and the accident board would not cooperate deciphering the contents, nor would they hand over transcripts or notes, and asked the police take the matter to the courts if they needed any further assistance.

In February 1995, SINTEF handed over a report ordered by the commission which revealed several absent safety procedures in Widerøe. The report was based on a recommendation by the International Civil Aviation Organization to take into consideration the organizational structure the aircraft operate within when investigating aviation accidents. In June, parliamentarian Magnus Stangeland criticized the commission for working too slowly, stating that the victims and next of kin needed answers as to why the accident happened. The lack of cooperation between the police and the commission was the main source of the delays. Similar delays had occurred after Partnair Flight 394 in 1989, which had resulted in the statute of limitations having come into effect by the time the report was published. A temporary report was presented to the survivors and next of kin on 20 March 1996; the report laid the responsibility for the accident on the airline. The final report was published on 10 July 1996 and laid the responsibility for the accident on the company and its operating routines. The report contained 26 recommendations for improvements for the company. The Norwegian Prosecuting Authority decided in September 1997 not to charge Widerøe for the accident. The direct culpability was placed on the pilots, who had died in the accident.
