= Sverre Rynning-Tønnesen =

Sverre Rynning-Tønnesen (24 April 1894 – 1970) was a Norwegian electrical engineer and civil servant.

He graduated from the Norwegian Institute of Technology in 1922, and began working in Kristiania in the same year. From 1945 to 1962 he served as director of Telegrafverket, which would change its name to Televerket in 1969 and Telenor in 1995. He had been named director already in 1942, but he was exiled in London until 1945 due to the German occupation of Norway.

He was an uncle of police leader Carl M. Rynning-Tønnesen.

Civic offices
Preceded by Andreas Hadeland	Director of Telegrafverket; 1962–1968	Succeeded by Leif Larsen
