= Christian Rynning-Tønnesen =

Norwegian businessperson (born 1959)

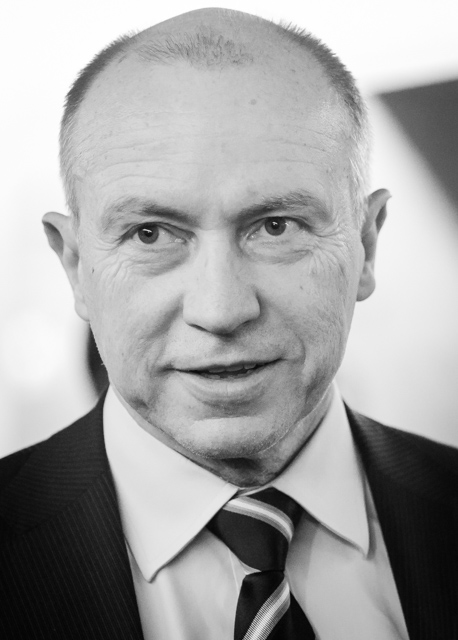
Christian Wilhelm Rynning-Tønnesen in 2017

Christian Wilhelm Rynning-Tønnesen (born 18 June 1959) is a Norwegian businessperson. He has spent most of his career in Statkraft, first holding various positions from 1992 to 2005, and then as CEO since 2010. He was CEO of Norske Skog from 2006 to 2010.

== Career ==
Rynning-Tønnesen was born in Oslo, and grew up in Kristiansand and Bergen. His father Carl M. Rynning-Tønnesen and grandfather were both prominent chiefs of police in Kristiansand, but Rynning-Tønnesen is educated as a civil engineer at the Norwegian Institute of Technology. He started his professional career as a researcher at SINTEF, worked with product development in the company Esso Norway from 1985 to 1989, and then as a consultant at McKinsey & Company from 1989 to 1992.

In 1992 he was hired by Statkraft. He held various positions in the leadership, the common denominator being a relation to strategy, the market and finance. He became acting chief executive officer in 2003, and was vice president of finance in 2005. On 1 April 2005 he was appointed as chief financial officer in the company Norske Skogindustrier. Among others, he worked with the much-discussed discontinuation of the paper mill Norske Skog Union.

On 20 February 2006 it was announced that Rynning-Tønnesen had been hired as CEO of the Statkraft-owned, Kristiansand-based power company Agder Energi. He was headhunted, and did not apply for the job. Chair of Agder Energi Sigmund Kroslid, who had taken the position in December 2005, praised Rynning-Tønnesen as "the clear primary candidate of the board". Stavanger Aftenblad noted that the new CEO did not want to negotiate a golden parachute. It was unclear when Rynning-Tønnesen would actually assume the position, but in early June he visited Agder Energi for preparations. However, the next week he declined the position to become CEO of Norske Skog. He had been offered the position in Norske Skog behind the scenes.

Jan Oksum, who in February 2006 "regretted" that Rynning-Tønnesen left Norske Skog, was fired due to poor results. The poor results continued under Rynning-Tønnesen, due to downward international trends and sinking demand for paper. From February to November 2007 the Oslo Stock Exchange value of Norske Skog plummeted by 20%. In 2008 the activity at Norske Skog Follum was lowered amid continued losses. Nonetheless, in 2008 he received an award for leadership, the "European CEO of the Year for the pulp and paper industry", from the information company RISI.

Rynning-Tønnesen assumed the office as CEO of Statkraft in the summer of 2010, and kept his annual salary of 3.9 million kr. This was 0.4 million more than the person he succeeded as CEO of Statkraft, Bård Mikkelsen, earned. It was the highest salary for a leader in a state-owned company in Norway.

In 2019, Rynning-Tønnesen received the Excellence in Sustainability Award from the Centre for Responsible Leadership.

== Personal life ==
Rynning-Tønnesen lives at Jar in Bærum, near Ringstabekk. He has a wife and four children.
