= Tore Ulstein =

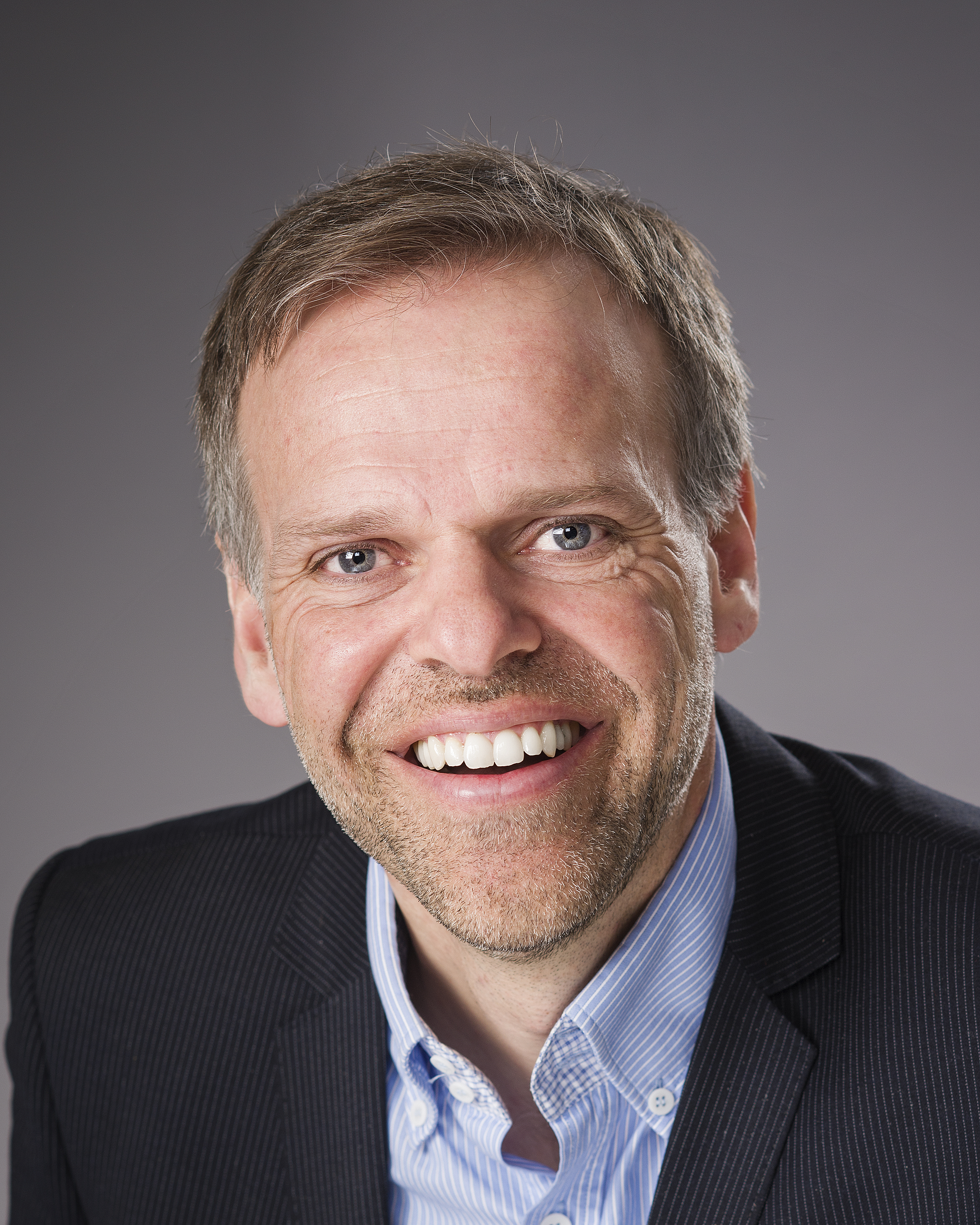
Tore Ulstein

Tore Ulstein (born 21 December 1967) is Chair of the Board in Ulstein Group and member of the board in several of the companies in Ulstein Group, and in Ulsmo, Head of the Board at SINTEF and member of the Board at GC Rieber AS. Tore Ulstein is the son of Ulstein Group's previous CEO, Idar Ulstein (1934–2012).

Tore Ulstein is a PhD in marine hydrodynamics from Norwegian University of Science and Technology (NTNU) and holds an engineering degree from NTNU and a Diploma from Massachusetts Institute of Technology (MIT). Tore Ulstein has worked as a first assistant professor II at NTNU and as a PhD in engineering at Marintek's vessel department.

Prior to Tore Ulstein's position as Chair of the Board in Ulstein Group, he was for several years deputy Chair of the Board, and he has had several leading positions in the Group, including deputy CEO and managing director of Ulstein Design & Solutions AS and Ulstein Verft AS. He has been Head of the Board and member of the Board in several organisations and companies, including to be the president of NHO – Confederation of Norwegian Enterprise from 2013 to 2017. He has been Head of the Board in NORCE, member of the Board of Division for Innovation, a member of the Norwegian Academy of Technological Sciences, a member of the Study Program Council for Marine Engineering, a member of the steering committee of the Global Centres of Expertise – Maritime, a member of Norwegian Industries' Innovation Committee, and a member of Det Norske Veritas' (DNV) Nordic Committee for Safety at Sea.
