= Leif Larsen (politician) =

Norwegian telegrapher and politician

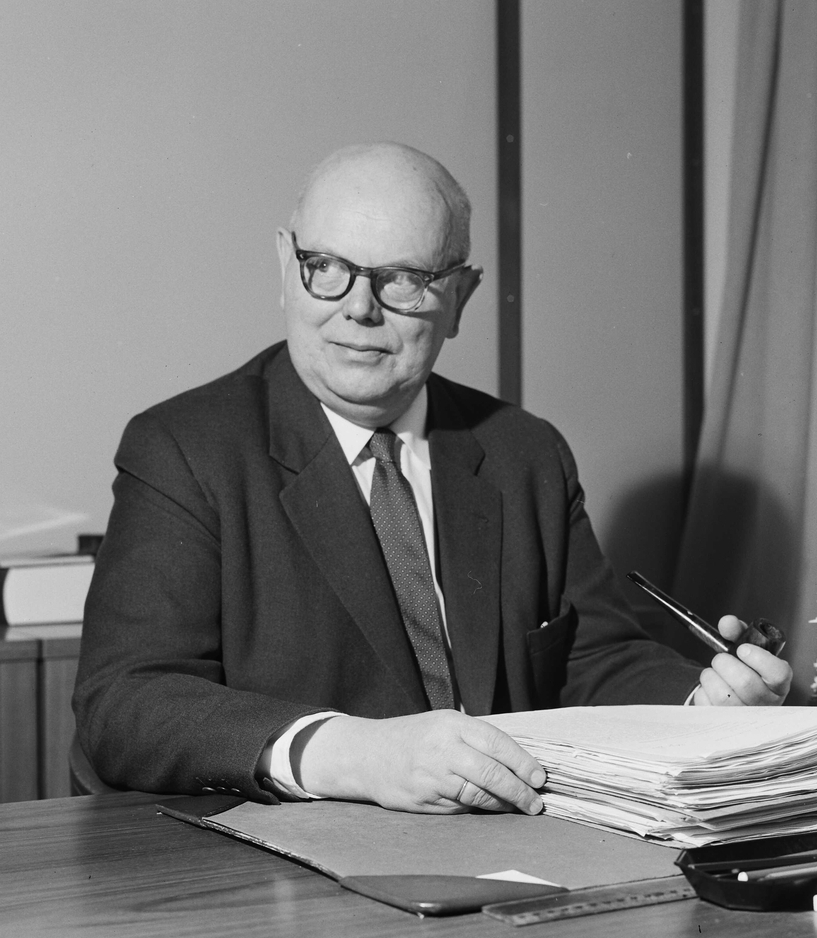
Leif Larsen in 1962

Leif Andreas Larsen (2 January 1898 – 29 April 1978) was a Norwegian telegrapher and politician for the Labour Party.

He was born in Kristiania, and moved to Bærum in 1926. He had an education as a telegrapher, and also took the cand.jur. degree in 1924. He chaired of the Labour Party chapter in Bærum from 1930 to 1935, and was elected to serve in Bærum municipal council in 1932. During the occupation of Norway by Nazi Germany he was imprisoned in Bredtveit concentration camp from 30 March 1943, then in Berg concentration camp from 26 July 1944 to 26 March 1945.

In May 1945, when Norway was liberated from the five-year-long German occupation, Larsen became deputy mayor of Bærum. After the 1945 Norwegian local elections he became mayor. He was the first mayor of Bærum to represent the Labour Party. He left the municipal council in 1951, but returned for the years 1956 to 1963, when he was again deputy mayor. From 1962 to 1968 he was the director of Telegrafverket, which would change its name to Televerket in 1969 and Telenor in 1995.

Larsen was decorated as a Commander of the Order of St. Olav. A road in Sandvika, Leif Larsens vei, has been named after him.

Political offices
Preceded by Bjarne L. Corwin	Mayor of Bærum; 1945–1951	Succeeded by Henry Lehre
Civic offices
Preceded by Sverre Rynning-Tønnesen	Director of Telegrafverket; 1962–1968	Succeeded by Per Øvregard
