= Carl M. Rynning-Tønnesen =

Norwegian police chief

Carl Mentz Rynning-Tønnesen (13 September 1924 – 28 April 2013) was a Norwegian police chief.

He was born in Jevnaker as a son of Christian Wilhelm Rynning-Tønnesen (1893–1963) and pharmacist Sigrid Jacobsen (1896–1961), and grew up in Kristiansand where his father was police chief. He was a nephew of Sverre Rynning-Tønnesen. In 1957 he married Grete Luhr. Their son Christian Rynning-Tønnesen is a leading corporate executive.

He graduated with the cand.jur. degree from the University of Oslo in 1949. He was hired as a police superintendent in Bergen in 1960 and Kristiansand in 1963. He then served as police inspector in Bergen from 1968, then police chief of Kristiansand from 1979 to 1992. He died in April 2013.
