= Peter L. Nissen =

Norwegian aviator and businessperson (1924–2024)

Peter Lynge Nissen
- Born: 8 January 1924; Stokke, Norway
- Died: 20 October 2024 (aged 100)
- Education: Norwegian Air Force Academy
- Occupations: Aviator; Business executive

Peter Lynge Nissen (8 January 1924 – 20 October 2024) was a Norwegian aviator and businessperson, best known as the chief executive officer of Widerøe from 1981 to 1988.

Having joined the Royal Norwegian Air Force-in-exile, he was decorated for his war contributions during the Second World War. After the war he continued a military career until 1975, and had later various administrative positions in civil aviation.

== Life and career ==
Nissen was born in Stokke on 8 January 1924, and grew up in Torstrand (in Larvik Municipality). He took his examen artium in 1943, and since this was during World War II the occupation of Norway by Nazi Germany, Nissen fled Norway to join the resistance movement. He travelled to England via Sweden in 1944, and joined the Royal Norwegian Air Force-in-exile. He was decorated with the Defence Medal 1940–1945 and the Legion of Merit. Nissen continued in the Air Force after the war, and graduated from the Norwegian Air Force Academy in 1951. He held several leadership positions; among others he served as leader for a contingent of Norwegian forces participating in the Congo Crisis. His last position in the Air Force was that of aerial attaché in Washington, D.C., from 1973 to 1975.

Nissen then embarked on a civil career. In 1975 he became manager of the newly established company Offshore Helicopters, which merged with Helikopterservice already in 1977. Nissen was then the chief executive officer of Fred. Olsen Airtransport from 1977 to 1981. In 1981 he took over as chief executive officer of Widerøe. He remained here until 1988. Nissen also served as president of Norsk Aero Klubb from 1982 to 1990. During his time in Widerøe, a disastrous incident occurred. The Widerøe Flight 933 crashed near Gamvik, killing all fifteen on board. In 1988 Nissen himself declared that the crash as "unsolved". In 2004, Nissen still held this opinion, despite that two prior investigation commissions had announced conclusive answers. Another major part of Nissen's period in Widerøe was the replacing of Twin Otter planes with Dash 7.

From 1988 to 1994 Nissen worked as manager of Røde Kors Automatene. He had previously been board member from 1981 and board chairman from 1986. He was also involved in Foreningen det nasjonale flymuseum, opposing the establishment of the Norwegian Aviation Museum in Bodø. He lived in Frogner for many years, and later resided in Stavern.

Nissen turned 100 on 8 January 2024, when he resided at a nursing home in Larvik. He died on 20 October 2024, at the age of 100.

Business positions
Preceded by Per Bergsland	CEO of Widerøe; 1981–1988	Succeeded by Bård Mikkelsen
