= Peter Norman Nissen =

British Army officer, engineer and inventor (1871–1930)

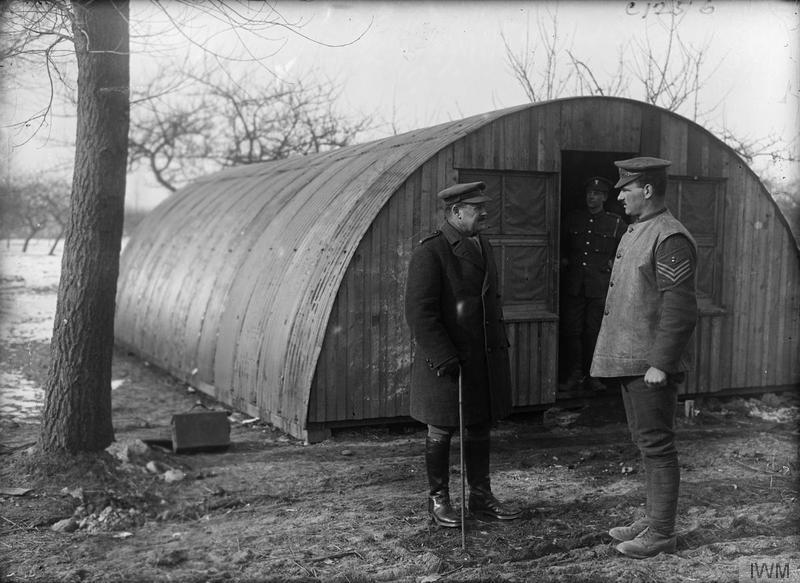
Nissen (left) talking to a company sergeant major of the Royal Engineers, 1917

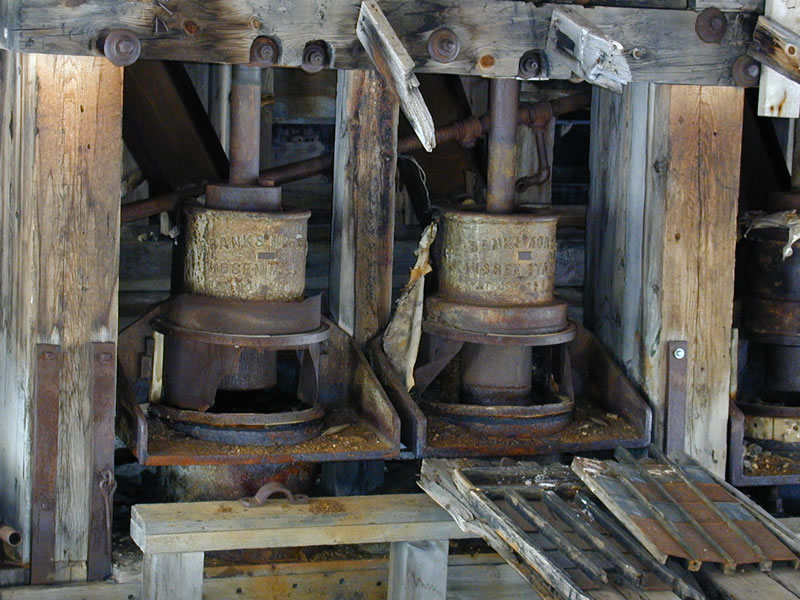
Two Nissen stamps, installed c. 1909 at the Sound Democrat Mill near Silverton, Colorado

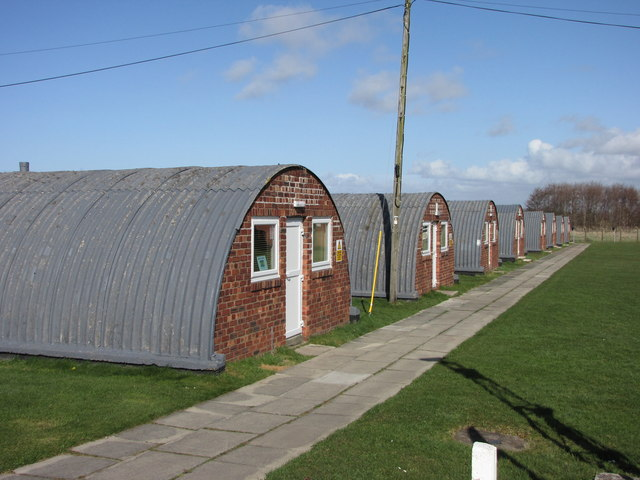
Nissen huts at Altcar Training Camp

Major Peter Norman Nissen, DSO (6 August 1871 – 2 March 1930) was a British Army officer, engineer and inventor. He held a number of patents for his inventions and developed the Nissen hut prefabricated shelter during the First World War.

== Early years ==
Peter Nissen was born in the United States. His father, Georg Herman Nissen, had emigrated from Bergen, Norway, in 1857. Georg Nissen was primarily a mining engineer who developed a stamp mill used in crushing ore. The family, which included his wife, Annie Lavinia Fitch, and his son, Peter, travelled around the United States and Canada as he changed job sites.

Peter Nissen moved with his family to Canada in 1891. He resided in Halifax, Nova Scotia and later studied mining engineering at the Mining and Agriculture School of Queen's University in Kingston, Ontario. Nissen completed his studies without taking the final examination. At university, he met Louisa Mair Richmond, whom he married in 1900.

== First World War ==
In 1910 he moved to Witwatersrand, South Africa, with his wife and daughter Betty and in 1913 he moved to Great Britain. Nissen worked there principally in the sale and distribution of the Nissen stamp mill until he joined the British Army at the start of the First World War. He was commissioned in January 1915 in the Sherwood Foresters (Nottinghamshire and Derbyshire Regiment), transferring to the Royal Engineers in May 1915.

Between 16 and 18 April 1916, Major Nissen of the 29th Company Royal Engineers began to experiment with hut designs. Nissen constructed three prototype semi-cylindrical huts. His design was subject to intensive review by his fellow officers, Lieutenant Colonels Shelly, Sewell and McDonald, and General Clive Gerard Liddell, which helped Nissen develop the design. After the third prototype was completed, the design was formalised and the Nissen hut was put into production in August 1916.

Two factors influenced the design of the hut. First, the building had to be economical in its use of materials, especially considering wartime shortages of building material. Second, the building had to be portable; this was particularly important in view of the wartime shortages of shipping space. This led to a simple form that was prefabricated for ease of erection and removal. The Nissen hut could be packed in a standard Army wagon and erected by six men in four hours. The record for erection was 1 hour 27 minutes. At least 100,000 were produced in the First World War.

Nissen patented his invention in the UK in 1916 and patents were taken out later in the United States, Canada, South Africa and Australia. Nissen received royalties from the British government only for their sale after the conflict; he received some £13,000. Production of Nissen huts waned between the wars, but revived in 1939. Nissen Buildings Ltd waived its patent rights for wartime production during the Second World War (1939–45).

In the 1917 New Year Honours, Nissen was awarded the Distinguished Service Order for his contribution to the war effort. He was awarded the Order of St. Sava, third class, by Serbia in 1919. After the War, he left the army with the rank of lieutenant colonel.

== Later years ==
He was naturalised in 1921 as a British subject. In that year he purchased Deepdale, an imposing house on Westerham Hill, Westerham, Kent, where he lived until his death. Until at least the 1970s, two Nissen huts at Deepdale were used as garages.

His first wife, Louisa, died in July 1923. Nissen married Lauretta Maitland in 1924, and they had two children: Peter and George. He died in 1930 and was buried at St Mary's Churchyard in Westerham.

== Patents ==
- Ore stamp-mill. A U.S. patent 776,414 A. Publication date Nov 29, 1904. Assigned to The Nissen Engineering Co.
- Ore-stamp-mill mortar. A U.S. patent 945,135 A. Publication date Jan 4, 1910. Assigned to The Nissen Engineering Co.

== Related reading ==
- Fred McCosh (1997). Nissen of the Huts: A biography of Lt Col. Peter Nissen, DSO. B D Publishing. ISBN 0-9525799-1-X.
- Stephen Van Dulken (2002). "The Nissen Hut". Inventing the 20th century: 100 inventions that shaped the world. NYU Press. p. 44. ISBN 978-0-8147-8812-7.
