= Oluf C. Müller =

Norwegian civil servant

Oluf Christian Müller (11 June 1921 – 26 June 2001) was a Norwegian civil servant.

He was born in Kristiansund. He finished his secondary education in 1941, took commerce school in 1944 and then enrolled in law studies. He took the cand.jur. degree at the University of Oslo in 1949, and worked as a deputy judge in Oslo, Eidsvoll and Søre Sunnmøre before being hired as a secretary in the Ministry of Finance in 1951. He was promoted to assistant secretary in 1957, sub-director in 1963 and deputy under-secretary of state in 1967. From 1969 to 1989 he served as the permanent under-secretary of state in the Norwegian Ministry of Industry, the highest-ranking bureaucratic position. The ministry was renamed as the Ministry of Trade in 1988. From 1989 to 1991 he worked there as a special adviser.

He was decorated as a Commander of the Order of St. Olav and holds the Order of the Falcon.

Civic offices
Preceded by	Permanent under-secretary of state in the Norwegian Ministry of Trade; 1969–1989	Succeeded by Lars Uno Thulin
