= Ulstein Group =

Norwegian shipbuilding company

Ulstein Group ASA
- Company type: Private
- Industry: Shipbuilding, ship design, power and control, maritime systems
- Founded: 1917 (as Ulstein Mekaniske Verksted)
- Headquarters: Ulstein Municipality, Norway
- Key people: Tore Ulstein (Chair of the Board), Gunvor Ulstein (CEO Ulstein Group)
- Products: Ship newbuilds, conversions and repairs, ship designs, power & control for the maritime market.
- Number of employees: About 500
- Website: ulstein.com

Ulstein Group is a group of companies focusing on various marine-related industries, but is mainly known for its shipbuilding and ship design activities. The largest unit is Ulstein Verft AS. The company's head office and primary operations are located in the town of Ulsteinvik in Ulstein Municipality in Møre og Romsdal county, Norway, an important area for the Norwegian maritime cluster, and with subsidiaries in several other countries. The group also includes companies working with power & control systems, engineering, site follow-up and aftermarket services. The company has also been engaged in shipping.

== History ==
The original company, Ulstein Mekaniske Verksted, was established in 1917 by Martin Ulstein and his brother-in-law Andreas Flø. At age 23, Martin and Andreas founded the company to modify local fishing boats, which were undergoing a global transition from sail-power to motorization. Martin Ulstein borrowed money from Ulstein Sparebank, with his father acting as guarantor, acquired 800 square metres (8,600 sq ft) of land from his uncle and set up shop with his brother-in-law and business partner Andreas Flø.

After Martin Ulstein's sudden death, his widow Inga took the position as Head of the Board, a position she held for many years. Their six children, Dagny, Inger, Magnulf, Kolbein, Idar, and Ragnhild (especially Kolbein and Idar) were responsible for the growth of the company to around 4,000 people at the end of the 1990s.

Vickers acquired Ulstein Group AS except the shipbuilding division in 1999, then Rolls-Royce acquired Vickers a few months later.

The new shipbuilding division was demerged and named UMV Holding and forms the basis for today's new Ulstein Group. In 2000, the new design activity in Ulstein was established (currently: Ulstein Design & Solutions AS) which began developing Ulstein designs. The ULSTEIN X-BOW®, the inverted bow concept, redefined marine engineering. The bow concept was launched in 2005, together with the first shipbuilding contract, and gained immediate interest from shipowners.

Still family-owned, a representative of the third generation, Tore Ulstein, is chairman of the board and CEO of Ulstein Group is Gunvor Ulstein.

== Divisions ==
=== Ulstein Verft AS ===
Ulstein Verft AS is a shipyard situated in Ulstein Group's primary base of operations, Ulsteinvik. Ulstein Verft was established in 1917, and is the largest employer in the group. The yard specialises in constructing advanced vessels, the latest being cable laying vessels, offshore wind service vessels, expedition cruise vessels, yachts and passenger (RoPax) vessels. Focusing on newbuilds and larger conversions, the yard also takes on service and aftermarket assignments such as docking, mooring, classifications, upgrades, maintenance and repair, crane lifts and barge transportation. Many, but not all, vessels built are based on Ulstein's own design, the 'Ulstein design' for which three hull line innovations are often implemented, the inverted bow, X-BOW, the X-STERN hull and the TWIN X-STERN. Two recent newbuild deliveries were Construction Service Operation Vessels (CSOVs) Olympic Boreas and Olympic Notos (2024), the first vessels delivered with the TWIN X-STERN® hull design.

=== Ulstein Elektro Installasjon AS ===
Ulstein Elektro Installasjon AS is part of the shipbuilding division in ULSTEIN. The company is responsible for electrical installations on board vessels at Ulstein Verft.

=== Ulstein Design & Solutions AS ===
Ulstein Design & Solutions AS is located in Ulsteinvik, Norway. The company develops ship designs and offers complete equipment packages for ship construction worldwide. The designs include vessels for the offshore renewables market (offshore wind), passenger vessels, cruise vessels and yachts, fisheries, and the offshore oil and gas market (Offshore Construction (OCV), IMR vessels, cable laying, platform supply vessels (PSVs) and Anchor handling tug supply vessels. Services also include CFD analyses, project management, site supervision, installation and commissioning as well as redesigns for conversions and upgrades. Ten years after the company introduced the patented X-BOW® (Inverted bow) the number of such designs sold passed the 100-mark. An add-on for the ship's stern, the X-STERN, was launched in 2014, and received the Next Generation Ship Award 2015. A third hull innovation, the TWIN X-STERN, was firstly contracted for offshore wind service vessels in 2022.

=== Ulstein Design & Solutions BV ===
Ulstein Design & Solutions BV designs large offshore construction vessels. The company develops projects for operators, contractors and ship owners in the offshore drilling, renewables, heavy-lift, construction and production market, as well as the maritime transport (feeder) market. Future market trends and end-user needs are the key drivers for developing and providing their new floating concepts to the offshore wind industry and the offshore oil and gas industries. One of the latest projects is its design for a semi-submersible foundation installation vessel, Seaway 7's Seaway Alfa Lift.

=== Ulstein Power & Control AS ===
Ulstein Power & Control offers worldwide services and retrofit of power packages and marine automation systems.

=== Ulstein Poland LTD. SP. Z.O.O. ===
Ulstein Poland is a part of an engineering pool in Ulstein Group and provides engineering services, as well as hull, outfitting and machinery documentation and on-site yard support.

=== Ulstein Marine Systems (Shanghai) Co. Ltd. ===
Ulstein Marine Systems (Shanghai) is a marketing and sales office based in China. The company offers engineering capacities and site support to Ulstein's ship design activities in China.

=== Ulstein Marine Equipment (Ningbo) Co. Ltd. ===
Ulstein Marine Equipment (Ningbo) manufactures electrical components and systems for offshore vessels developed by ULSTEIN.

=== Ulstein Electrical Technology (Ningbo) Co. Ltd. ===
Ulstein Electrical Technology (Ningbo) is engaged in technical consulting, installation, commissioning and after-sales service.

=== Ulstein International AS ===
Ulstein International is located in Ulsteinvik, Norway. Engaged in consulting, project establishments and business development.

=== Ulstein Digital AS ===
Ulstein Digital ensures that every vessel can be delivered digital-ready - Equipped with a secure, class-trusted data pipeline from day one.

=== Blue Ctrl AS ===
Blue Ctrl develops and delivers marine automation and control systems.

== ULSTEIN X-BOW ==
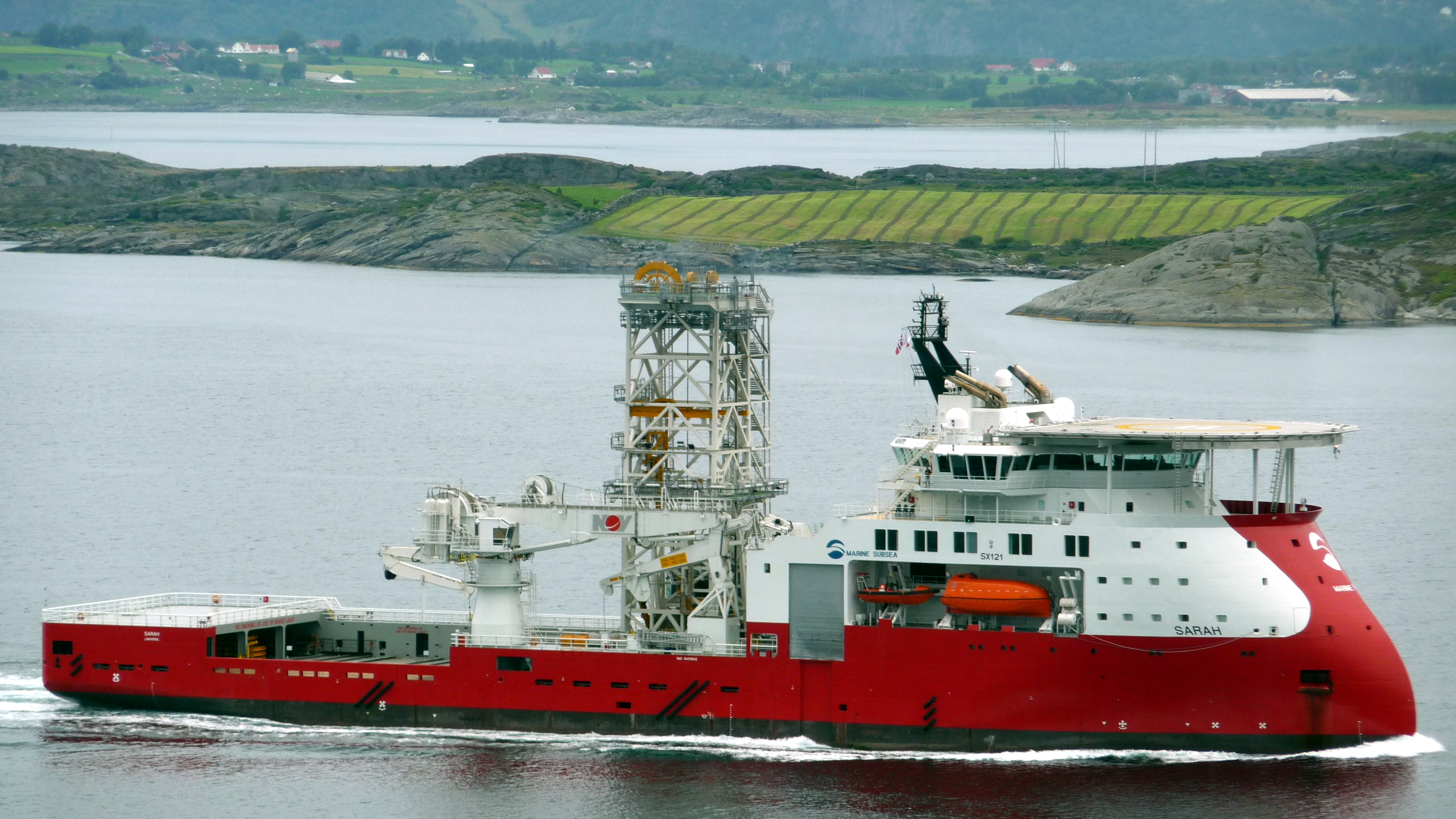
Well intervention vessel Sarah (now: Skandi Constructor), an X-bow vessel.

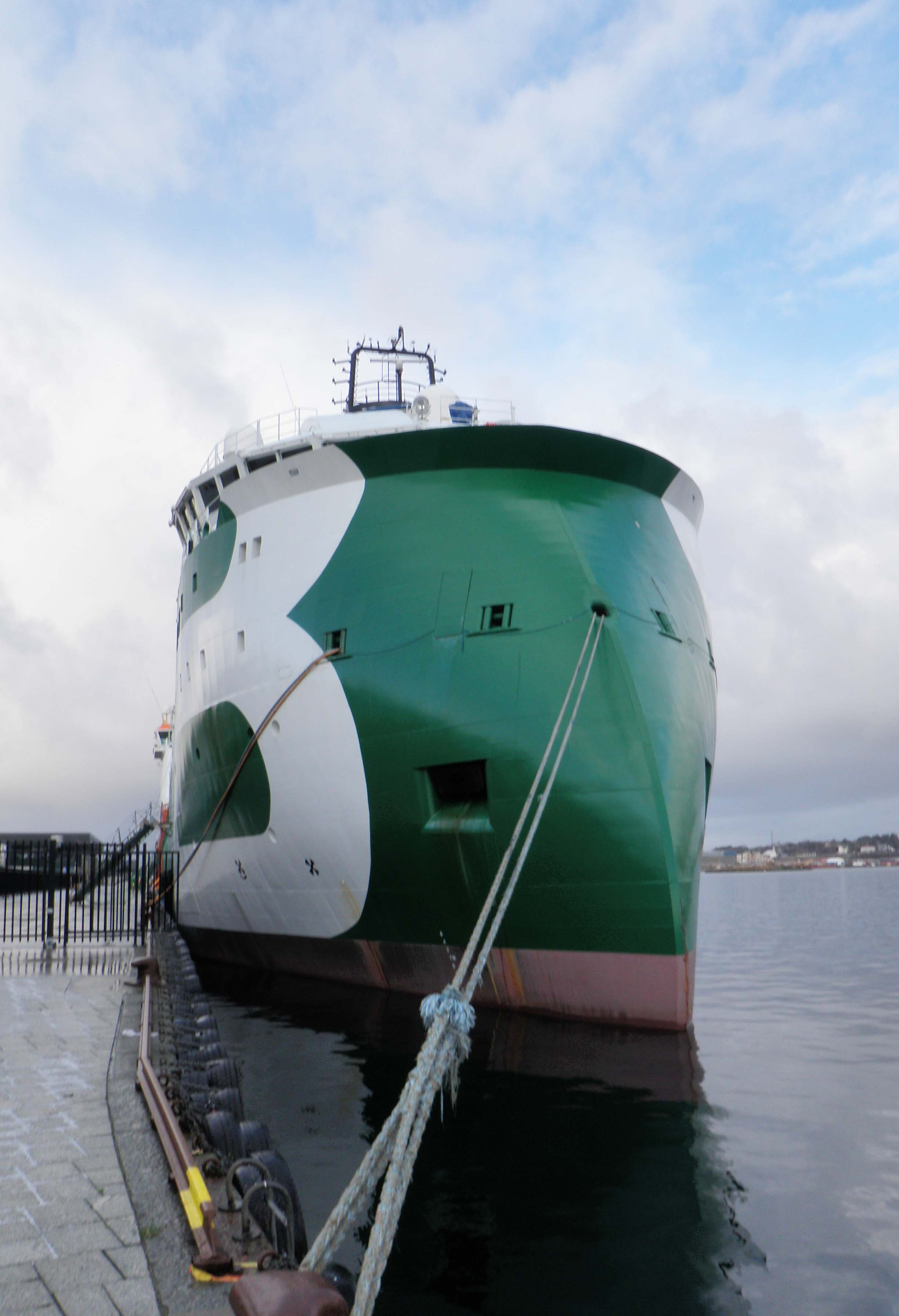
Bourbon Orca anchor tug shown in 2012, was the first ship built with an Ulstein X-bow, in 2006.

The ULSTEIN X-BOW, an inverted bow, introduces the gentle displacer, ship's bow a tapered fore ship shape with a different volume distribution as well as sectional angles, resulting in a wave piercing effect at small wave heights, and also reduces pitching and bow impact loads in bigger seas. The anchorhandling tug supply vessel, Bourbon Orca, built for Bourbon Offshore Norway, was the first ship built with the ULSTEIN X-BOW in 2006. In 2017, Norges Bank, the Central Bank of Norway, introduced a new series of banknotes, with the X-BOW featured on the NOK 100 note. In (2019), the X-BOW was introduced to the cruise industry. Later developments from the X-BOW include the X-STERN, which introduces the X-BOW effect to the aft ship, and the TWIN X-STERN for improved operability and fuel efficiency.
