= Idar Ulstein =

Norwegian businessperson

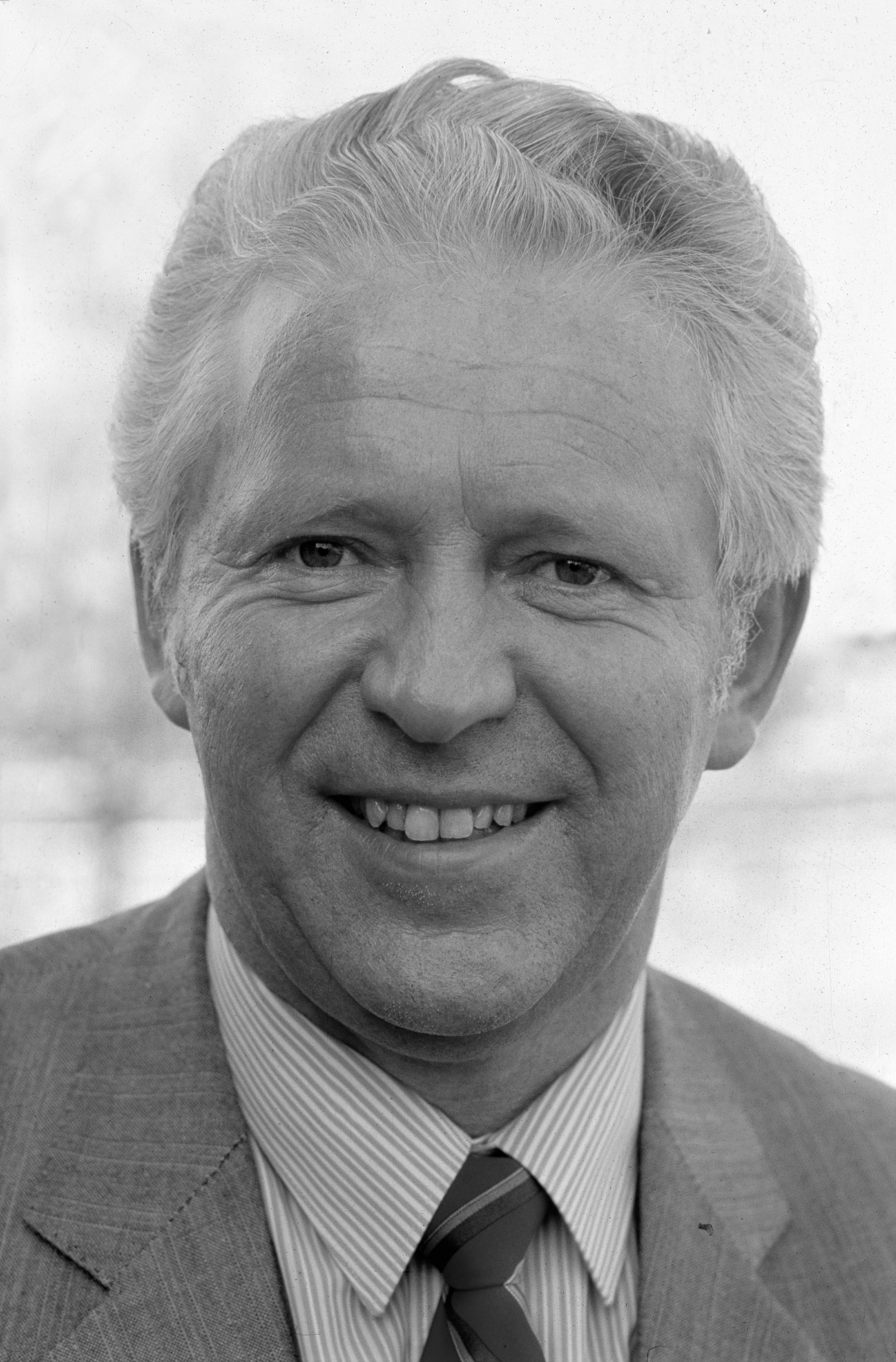
Idar Ulstein, CEO and head of the board at Ulstein Group for many years

Idar Lars Ulstein (2 April 1934 – 29 April 2012) was a Norwegian businessman.

He was educated as a naval architect at the Norwegian Institute of Technology in Trondheim, Norway. After completion of his education in 1962, he entered the family business Ulstein Group, and was manager of the company until he retired as chief executive in 1997. He then served as chairman of the board until 2011.

Idar Ulstein was a member of the Norwegian Academy of Technological Sciences, and was appointed Knight, First Class of the Order of St. Olav for his "service to Norwegian industry". In 2010, he was awarded the OSJ Lifetime Achievement Award.
