= Sandvika Fjordturer =

Ferry operator in Norway

Sandvika Fjordturer AS
- Company type: Private
- Industry: Transport
- Headquarters: Sandvika, Norway
- Area served: Bærum
- Key people: Bjørn Salomonsen (owner)
- Website: www.rigmor.no

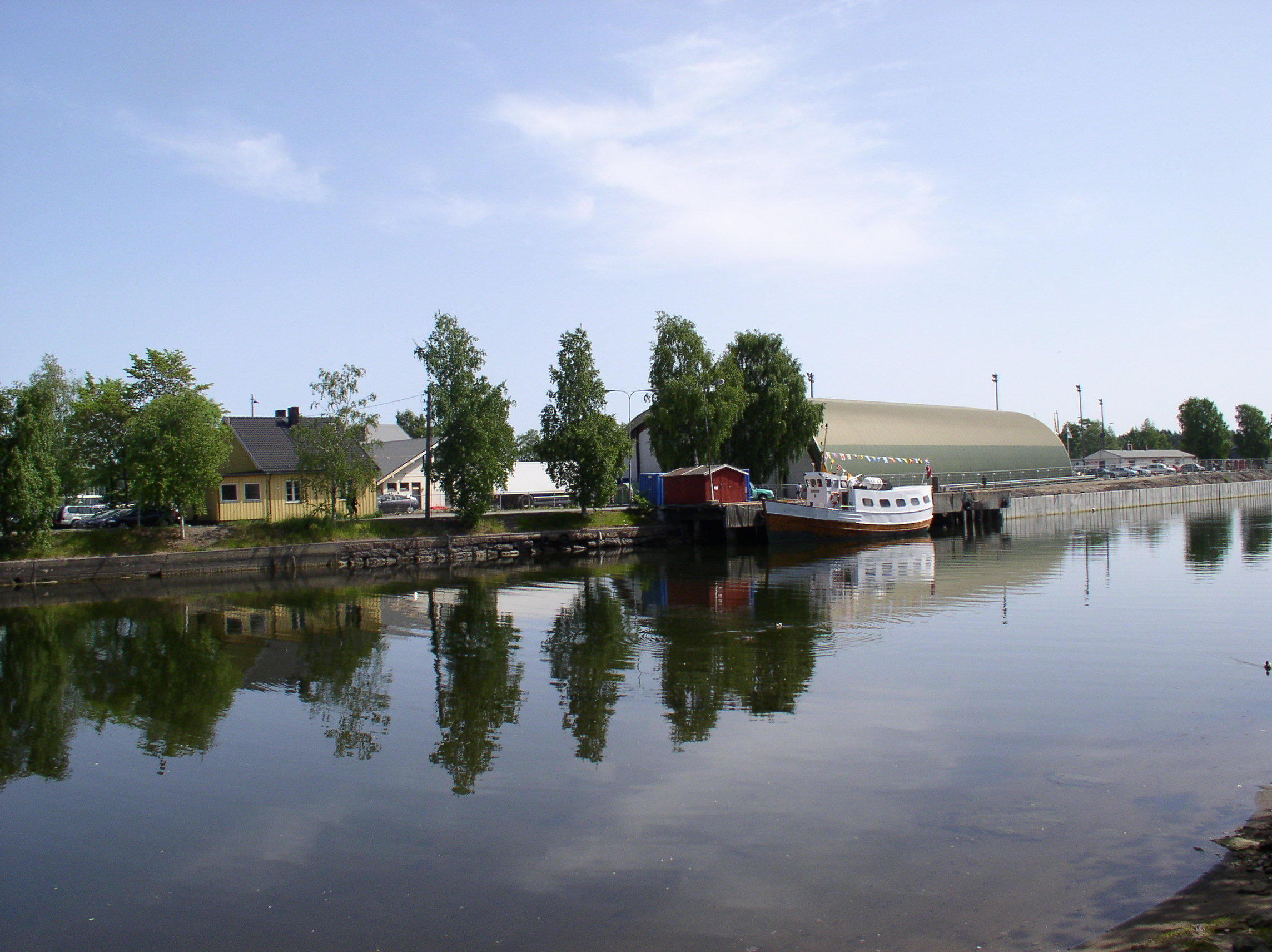
MS Rigfar docked at Kadettangen

Sandvika Fjordturer is a passenger ferry operator in Oslofjord in Akershus county, Norway. The company operates from Kadettangen outside of Sandvika to the islands of Borøya, Brønnøya, Ostøya and Langåra on contract with Ruter, serving route 711. The company operates the ferries M/S Rigmor and M/S Rigfar, the first being the oldest wooden ferry in regular scheduled traffic in Norway. The company has 40,000 passengers annually. Kadettangen is served by the lines 705 and 706 of the Ruter bus network. The nearest railway station is Sandvika.
