= Skytterdalen =

Valley in Norway

Coordinates: 59.89702°N 10.52462°E

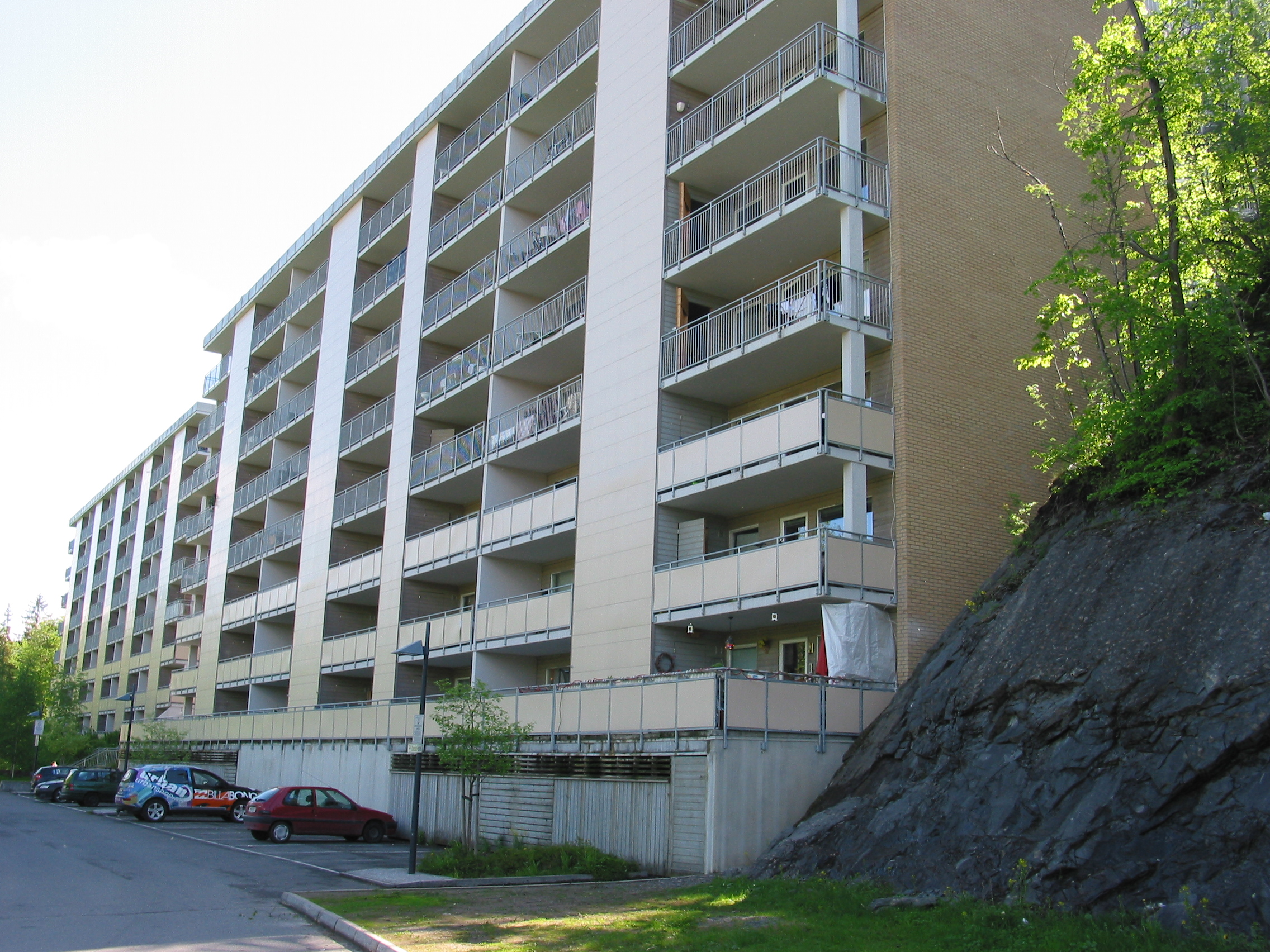
Building block, Løkkeåsen in the background.

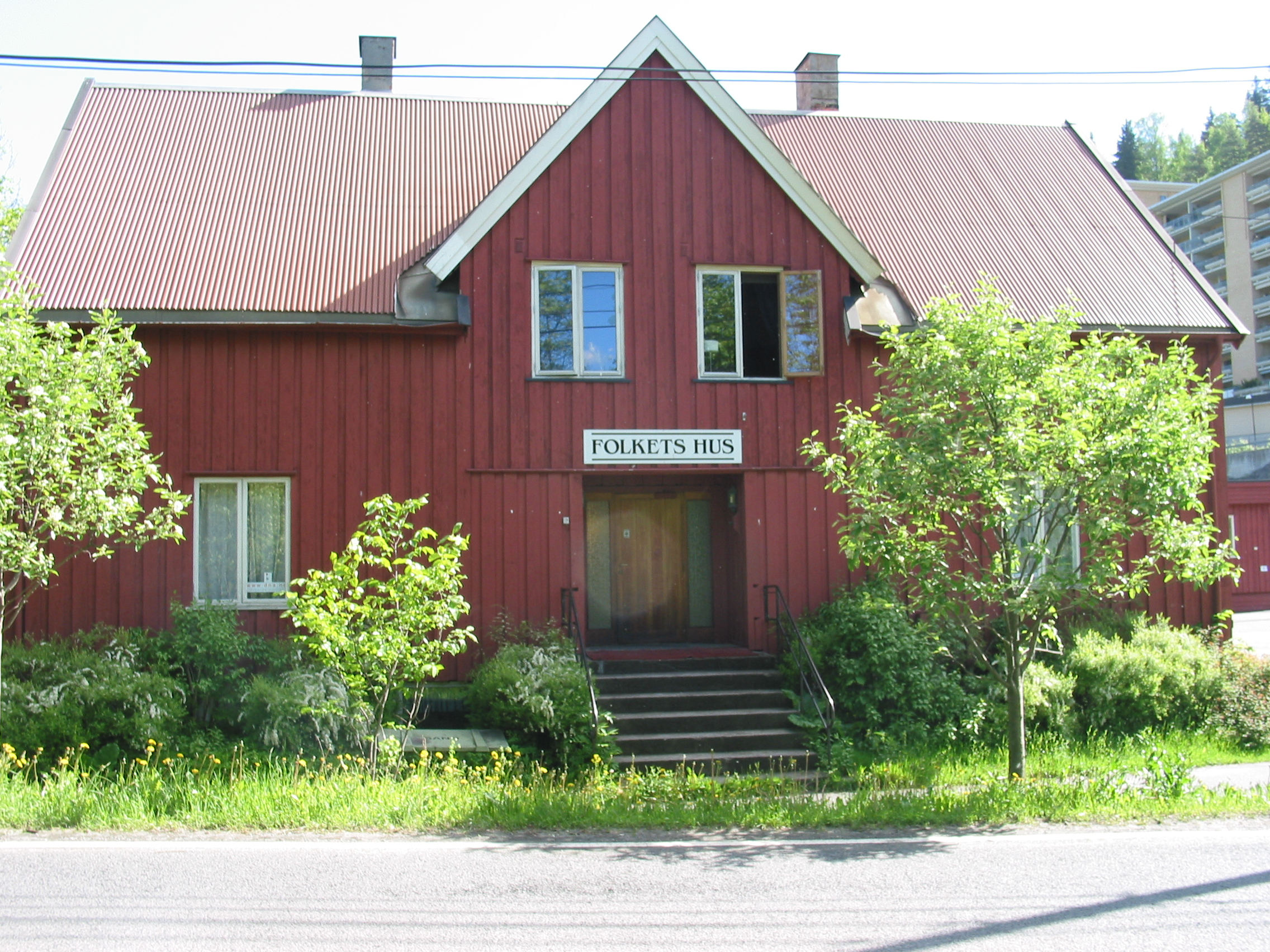
The People's House.

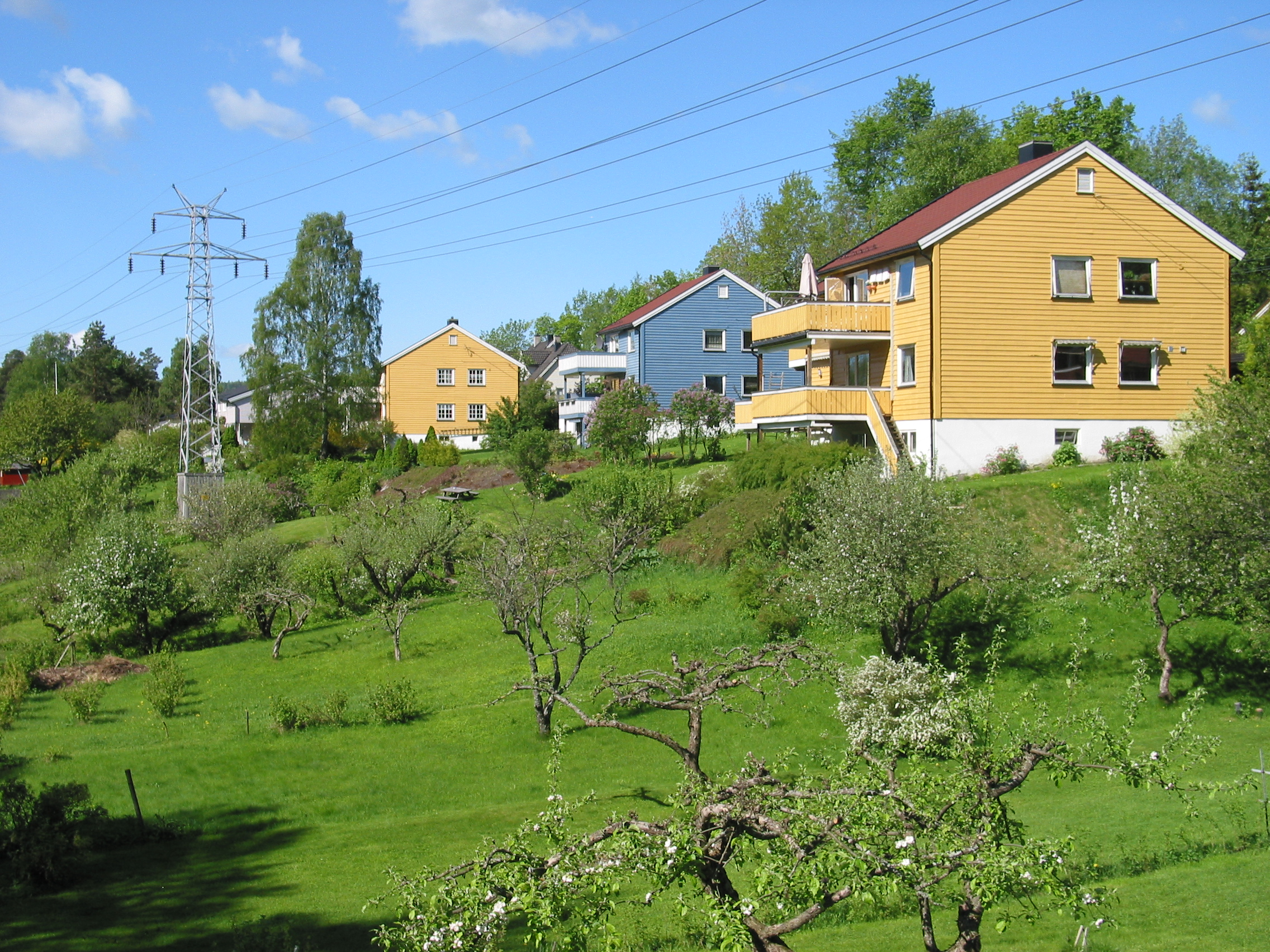
Skytteråsen.

Skytterdalen is a small, populated valley north of Sandvika in Bærum, Norway.

== Geography ==
The valley lies between two hills; Skytteråsen in the northwest and Løkkeåsen in the southeast. The creek Solbergbekken runs through it, formed at Solberg, at the confluence of three lesser creeks from Valler in the west, Avløs in the north and Løkeberg in the east. From Solberg it ran almost in a straight southwestern line through Skytterdalen. Schools of brown trout were found there, and fishing was popular; however in modern times the entire watershed has been led underground through a pipe system. At the foot of the valley the creek crosses the road Leif Larsens vei, named after Leif Larsen, before emptying into the meandering river Sandvikselva.

== History ==
The name, meaning 'Shooter Valley', stems from the sport shooting activity in the late nineteenth century. The local rifle association, Bærums Skytterlag, had their shooting field here from 1867 to 1885, when it was moved.

Parts of Skytterdalen is built-up, and there are two tall apartment buildings with 136 apartments. After the 2008 Ålesund landslide, steps were taken to protect the area from landslides in Løkkeåsen. Skytteråsen was built-up in the interwar period. A stamp mill Løkkeåsen pukkverk was operational in the same period, but was closed after an accident in 1945. The municipality took over, but the mill was ultimately discontinued in the 1970s.

At the foot of Skytterdalen is found Folkvang or Folkets hus ('The People's House'), a meeting place for the local labour movement. The initiative was taken by laborers from the paper factory at Hamang, and the house was erected in 1915–1916 by the paper factory trade union and the Norwegian Labour Party, and renovated in 1982. The house is still used as a site of labour movement rituals, like May Day speeches. It has also been used as a courthouse, boxing arena, theatre stage and cinema.

Next to Folkets hus is an International Montessori Pre-School. The upper secondary schools Valler and Sandvika and the primary school Evje are all within walking distance.

== Transportation ==
The Løkkeås Tunnel, a planned road tunnel integrated as a part of the Norwegian National Road 164, will run under Løkkeåsen and emerge near Folkets hus. The proposed length is 190 metres. When it comes to public transportation, Skytterdalen is served by the lines 705 and 706 of the Ruter bus network; the bus station is named Folkets hus. Sandvika Station is within walking distance.
