= Kjørbo =

Coordinates: 59°53′09″N 10°31′38″E

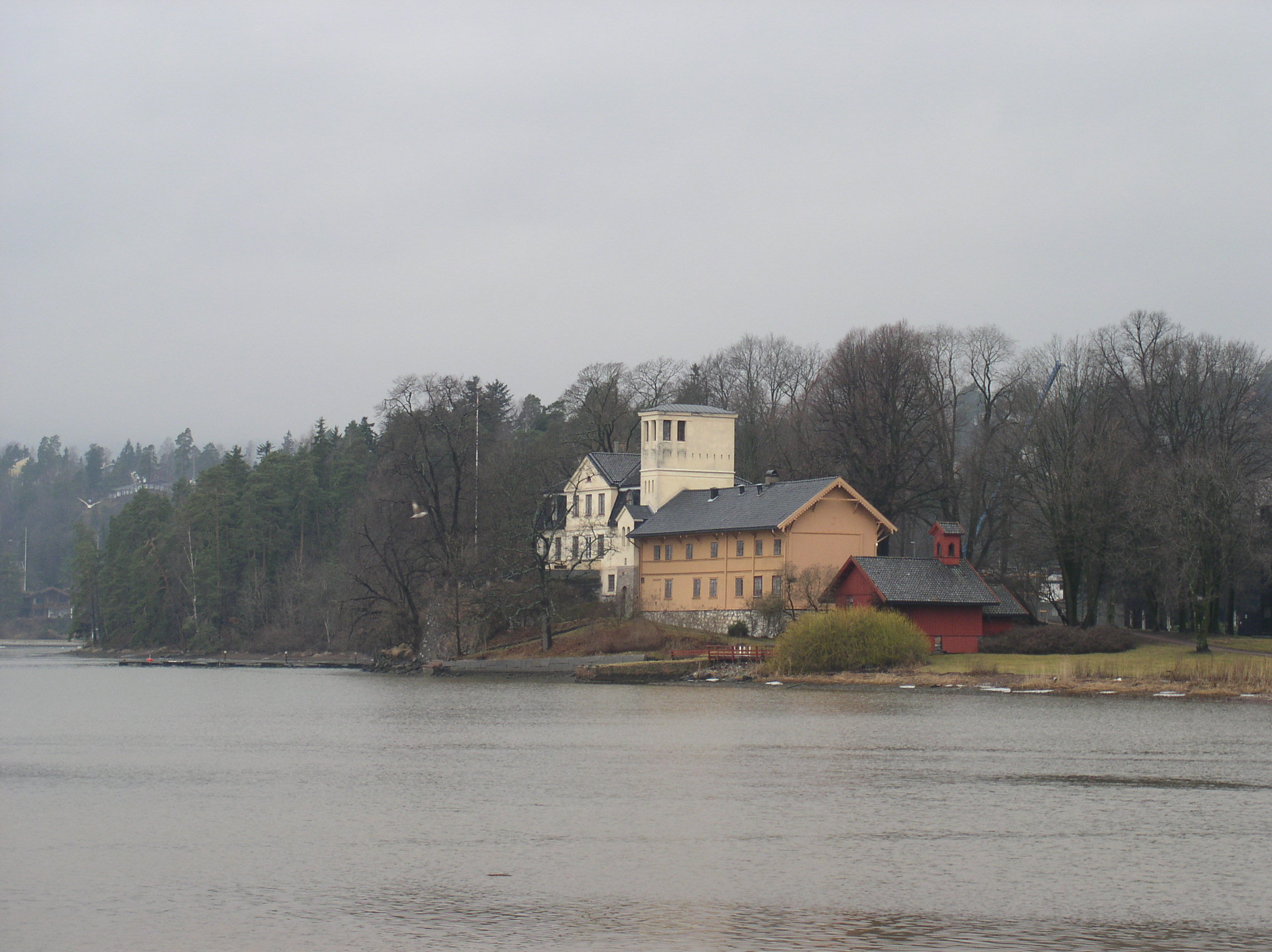
Kjørbo manor

Kjørbo is a former manor in Bærum, Norway.

It is located slightly south of the city of Sandvika, near the outlet of the river Sandvikselva, at the opposite shore of Kadettangen. Originally a home farm under Nesøya manor, in 1630 it was made into a manor of its own and resident site of Nesøygodset. After a long series of private owners, the whole property was sold to Norconsult-gruppen, a group of consulting firms operating in the international market which established its Norwegian headquarters on the venerable grounds. The futuristic offices premises were built for Norconsult-gruppen and Norconsult International and inaugurated in 1981. The company Saga Petroleum Eiendom acquired the property in 1990 and Norsk Hydro in 1999. From June 2009 the local police will be accommodated in new localities at Kjørbo.
