= Kadettangen =

Topographical feature in Greater Oslo, Norway

Coordinates: 59.8889°N 10.5301°E

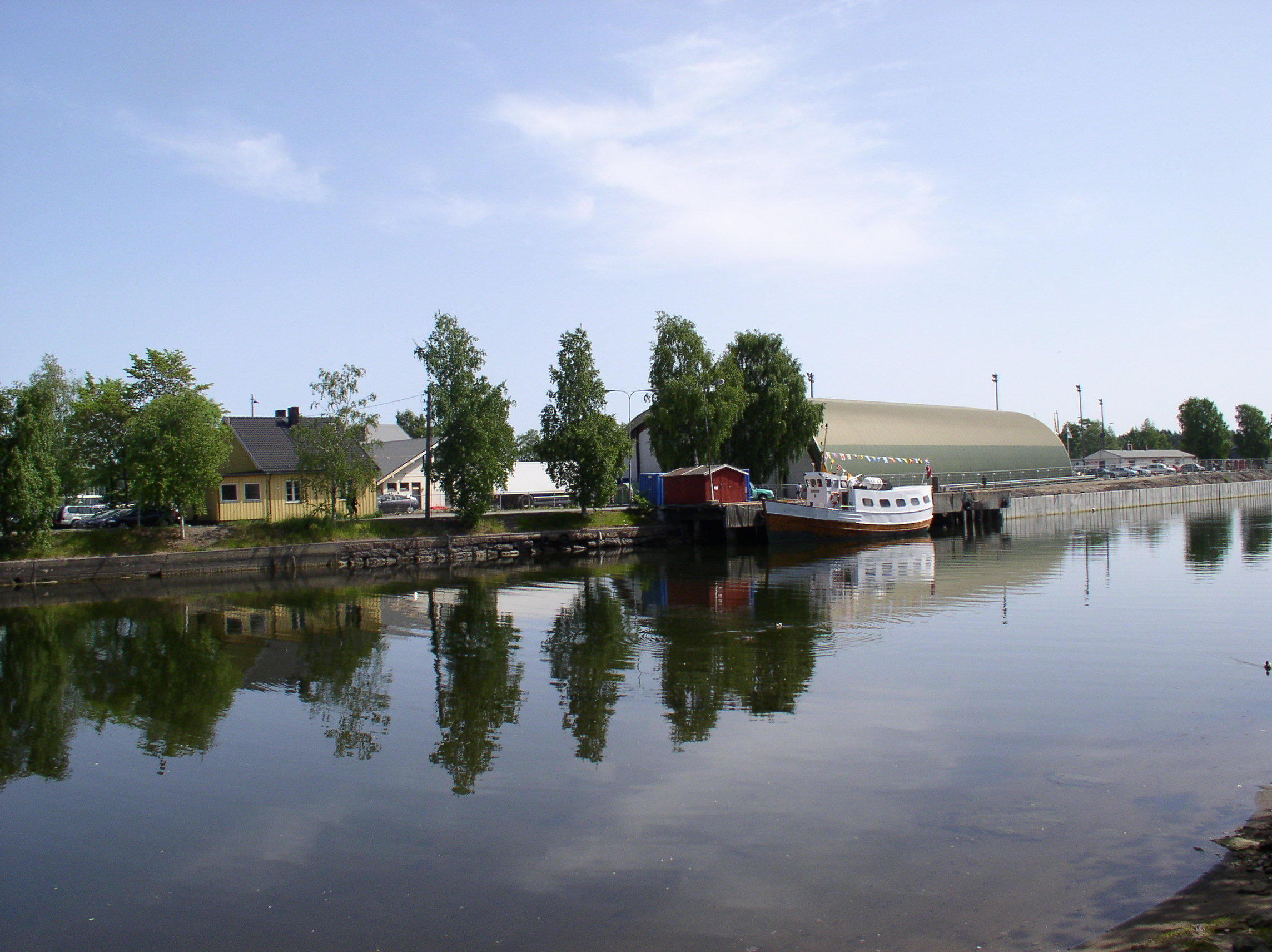
The ship Rigfar at Kadettangen. The large building in the background is Bærumshallen.

Kadettangen is a small peninsula outside of Sandvika in Bærum, Norway. Originally named Sandvikstangen, it got its current name from the cadet training conducted by the Norwegian Military Academy for the better part of the nineteenth century. The peninsula is now used mainly for boating, beach life and sports, being the home ground of association football club Bærum SK.

== Geography ==
The peninsula is located slightly south of the town of Sandvika, at the outlet of the river Sandvikselva, at the opposite shore of Kjørbo. To the south lies the island of Kalvøya, to which Kadettangen is connected to with a suspension bridge. The southern end of Kadettangen is now used for leisure purposes, with its beach and beach volleyball facilities. Because of its low altitude and consequent problems with flooding, the peninsula was reinforced with fill dirt. The practice of filling around Kadettangen continues to this day, with proposals to increase the land area with leftover material from the excavation of the Løkkeås Tunnel as a part of Norwegian National Road 164.

== History ==
It was formerly a crop field under Kjørbo Manor, and was originally named Sandvikstangen. Some time between 1820 and 1825 the Norwegian Military Academy started using it as a bivouac camp for summer training of cadets, hence the name change. The military bought the outer parts of the peninsula for 657 Norwegian speciedaler at an auction in 1869. It was in use by the academy until 1894, after which His Majesty The King's Guard used it for summer training for two seasons. From 1902 it was rented by Bærum Municipality for 400 Norwegian krone (NOK) per year, including use of the military buildings. A quarter of the rental sum was to be used for maintaining the facility, and the military retained the right to use the site two months each year. The municipality started negotiating a purchase of the land in 1911, initially bidding NOK 20,000. A sales agreement was reached in 1916, when a price of NOK 50,000 was accepted. When the municipality took over, parts of Kadettangen was used as a playground; arenas for organized sport were later built.

The inner parts of the peninsula were sold by Kjørbo Manor's owner, Erich Waller, to Christiania og Omegns Dampskibsselskab in 1857. The steamship company went under five years later and the docks they had established at Kadettangen were auction beck to Waller for 40 speciedaler. The inner parts of the peninsula continued to be used as a harbor, and was eventually owned by Anthon Walle. The municipality bought this section from his estate in 1912, following his death. The area received permission to operate as a port in 1916. The municipality hired a harbor-master to run the facility. The steamship company's office and expedition building from 1858 was converted to a harbor master's office. The municipality established a volunteer fire corps in 1876, which was stationed in a dockside building at Kadettangen.

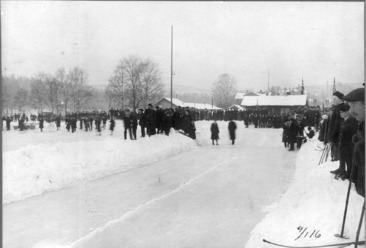
From the opening of the speed skating rink in 1916

Because of the food shortage caused by the First World War, the police in Sandvika converted the former military dining hall as a distribution point for food. The skating rink at Kadettangen opened in 1916. The rowing club Bærum RK, founded in 1917, moved its headquarters from Kalvøya to Kadettangen in 1925, as it found the location on the island too isolated. The club house was also commonly used for revues and from 1935 it also hosted a kayak club. The rowing club fell into financial difficulties through the 1930s, and was forced to auction away their club house in 1936. The municipality won the bid, paying NOK 5000. A new fire station was built in 1927. For a period there was also a cement molding factory on Kadettangen, owned by Waldemar Michelsen.

Norske Luftruter stated in 1930 that they would have preferred Gressholmen Airport, the water aerodrome serving Oslo, to have been replaced with a new airport, and mentioned Kadettangen as a suitable location for a water aerodrome. However, the issue was never considered by the authorities. The beach was constructed in the 1930s, which included reinforced the peninsula with fill dirt. The stadium was upgraded in 1938, receiving a new grass pitch and locker rooms. The military returned briefly during the German occupation of Norway from 1940 to 1945. IL Tyrving's shed with inventory burned down in 1955, lashing a major blow to the club as they had not insured their assets.

The bridge across to Kalvøya opened in 1963. Prior to this, the military had occasionally built pontoon bridges across the island. Tyrving installed a workman's shed as club house in 1963, followed by a second shed in 1970. The locker rooms were upgraded in 1967, followed up with an upgrade of the running track the following year, for the first time giving it a circumference of 400 meters (1,300 ft). Bærum SK completed Bærumshallen 1970, followed by their club house in 1984.

Former mayor of Bærum, Gunnar Gravdahl (Conservative), has stated that the sports facilities should be removed and replaced with a public baths. His successor as mayor, fellow party member Odd Reinsfelt denounced the idea, stating that there was no viable replacement location for the sporting activities. In 2009, Bærum SK chairman Jan Erik Aalbu suggested that the sports field be renamed Sandvika stadion. The new name was taken into use the following year. The stadium received a NOK 8-million upgrade in 2012, with the installation of new artificial turf and new stands, allowing Bærum SK to meet the stadium criteria for the Norwegian First Division.

== Sports ==
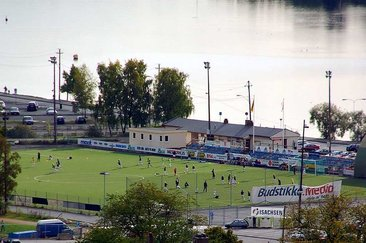
The main football field

The northern part of Kadettangen is used for sports. An artificial grass pitch with a tribune along the western sideline serves as the home ground of the football club Bærum SK, which plays in the First Division as of 2014. The stadium has a pitch which measures 95 by 66 meters (312 by 217 ft) and has under-soil heating. There is seating for 602 spectators, of which 400 are under a roof. The attendance record is 1,819 people from a Norwegian Football Cup match in 2004 Norwegian Football Cup, when Bærum SK beat Vålerenga in the third round.

Bærum SK was founded in 1910 as Grane, changing its name to Mode in 1946 and taking the current name in 1969. As of 2011 it had 725 members and 40 teams in football. The club has previously played bandy, ice hockey, athletics and handball. The elite football team played in the Second Division in 1980 and again at the second tier in the 2003, 2012 and 2014 seasons.

Bærum SK's club room, raised in 1984, is located in an adjacent building which is shared with the athletics and orienteering club IL Tyrving. Bærum SK also has an indoor football arena, Bærumshallen, which is used for exhibitions and sales in addition to sports. The 1947 Norwegian Athletics Championships were held at Bislett Stadion in Oslo, although the decathlon event was organized by Tyrving at Kadettangen. The site of the indoor arena was used for three ice hockey matches at the 1952 Winter Olympics. This involved the United States beating Germany 8–2, Switzerland beating Norway 7–2 and Czechoslovakia beating Finland 11–2.

During the 1950s and 1960s, motorcycle speedway was regularly contested at Kadettangen. The venue hosted the final of the Norwegian Individual Speedway Championship in 1963 and 1964. Other former activities at the sports field are speed skating and bandy.

== Transportation ==
Kadettangen is a starting point for island-hopping in the local section of the Oslofjord. The company Sandvika Fjordturer operates out of an office at Kadettangen, and its two ships, Rigmor and Rigfar, are in quay at the western shore of the peninsula. Since 1963 Kadettangen is also connected to the island Kalvøya by bridge. On the eastern shore, there is a calling port for medium-sized ships.

In terms of public transportation, Kadettangen is served by the lines 705 and 706 of the Ruter bus network; the bus station is named Sandvika rådhus. The proximate railway station is Sandvika. The European Road E18 runs through Sandvika, more or less separating Kadettangen from the town.

== Bibliography ==
- Jacobsen, Jacob (1979). Sandvika – i Bærum (in Norwegian). Bærum: Kulturstyret i Bærum.
- Tyrving 1922–1997 (in Norwegian). Bærum: IL Tyrving. 1997. ISBN 82-994273-0-4.
