= Borøya, Bærum =

Island in Bærum, Norway

Borøya
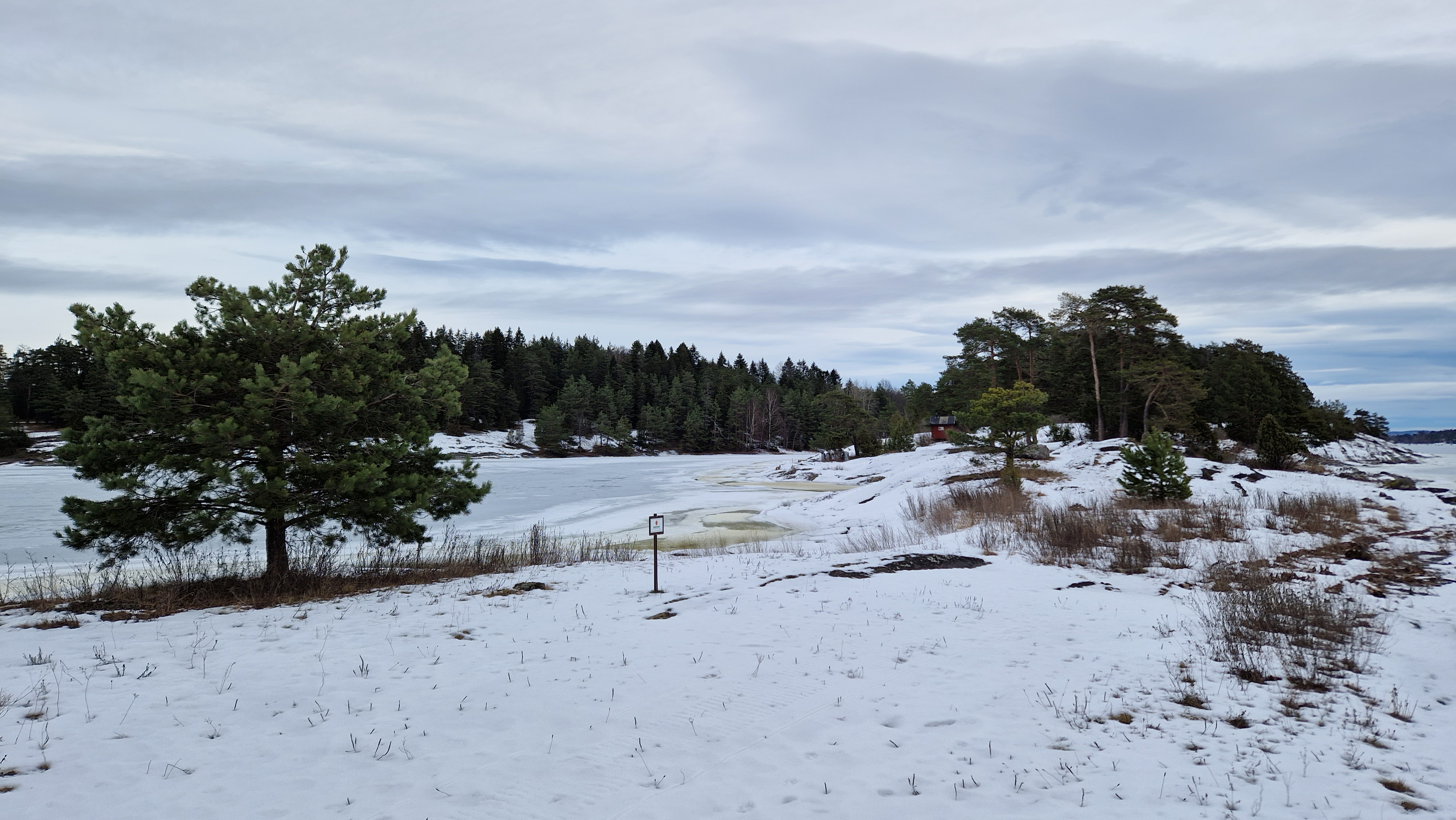
- Labukta bay on Borøya

- Location in Akershus

Geography
- Location: Oslofjord
- Coordinates: 59°52′45″N 10°33′23″E

Administration
- Norway
- County: Akershus
- Municipality: Bærum
- IUCN category Ia (strict nature reserve)
- Area: 27.5 ha (68 acres)
- Established: 27 June 2008
- Governing body: County Governor of Østfold, Buskerud, Oslo and Akershus

Borøya is an island in the western section of the inner Oslofjord (Vestfjorden), off Sandvika in the municipality of Bærum, Akershus, Norway. Situated between Kalvøya to the north and Ostøya to the south, the island is a state-secured public recreation area, and most of its territory has been protected as a nature reserve since 2008.

== Geography and geology ==
Borøya consists of Cambrian–Silurian bedrock with marine deposits filling its lower depressions. Its landscape is shaped by two elongated, partially wooded ridges running southwest to northeast, separated by a flatter central depression of formerly cultivated land. Two smaller islets, Saraholmen and Furuholmen, lie immediately adjacent to Borøya.

== Nature reserve ==
Borøya Nature Reserve (Norwegian: Borøya naturreservat) was established by royal decree on 27 June 2008. The reserve encompasses most of Borøya along with the neighboring islets of Furuholmen and Saraholmen, with a mapped area of 275 decares (27.5 ha (68 acres)), of which approximately 273 decares (27.3 ha (67 acres)) is land. It is classified as an IUCN Category Ia strict nature reserve and forms part of the Emerald Network.

The reserve was created to protect a varied mosaic of coastal and calcareous habitats, including dry calcareous meadows, rocky outcrops, coastal meadows along the northern shore and inner bays, and calcareous pine forest. According to the Norwegian Environment Agency, this habitat diversity makes Borøya one of the most conservation-worthy islands in the inner Oslofjord. Notable species recorded on the island include Reverdin's blue (Plebejus argyrognomon), one of Scandinavia's rarest butterflies, as well as several red-listed vascular plants and 14 red-listed soil-dwelling fungal species—among them a large occurrence of the waxcap Hygrocybe lacmus.

Within the reserve, vegetation and wildlife are protected against damage, motorized traffic and organized camps are prohibited, and fires or grilling are restricted to designated sites approved by management authorities.

== History ==
The name Borøya has been interpreted as deriving either from bjørn ('bear') or from bord / bånd ('board' or 'band'), referring to the banded limestone strata in the rock or the island's narrow, elongated shape.

Two prehistoric round burial cairns (gravrøyser), each measuring approximately 8 m (26 ft) in diameter, are located on the island. Built of rounded boulders and quarried stone, they have been dated by archaeologists to the Bronze Age or Iron Age and are automatically protected cultural monuments.

Historically, Borøya belonged to the Kjørbo estate, together with Kalvøya and Saraholmen. A map from 1884 records a crofter's holding (husmannsplass) in the northwestern part of the island, and a hay barn (Borøylaet) stood to the southeast until its demolition after World War II. Hay harvested on the island was stored in the barn until it could be hauled across the winter ice to Kjørbo via the bay now known as Labukta. Bærum Municipality acquired Borøya in 1950. Grazing by sheep was reintroduced in 2002 to prevent overgrowth and maintain the open cultural landscape in the center of the island.

== Recreation and access ==
Borøya features a sandy beach, grassy clearings, and public mooring facilities, and tent camping is permitted outside the reserve boundaries.
