= Fabriken Tomten =

Former Norwegian cleaning products maker

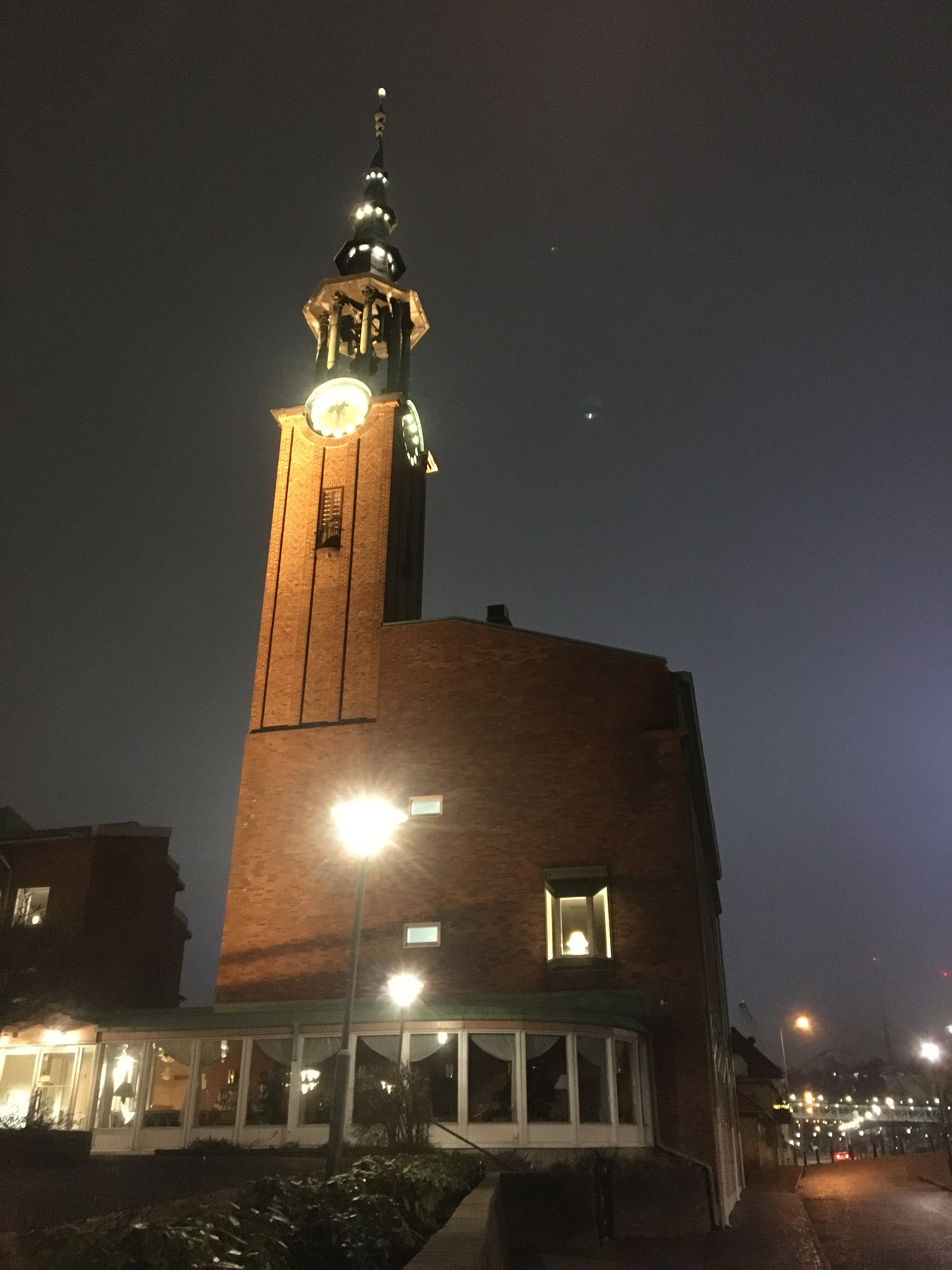
- The tower house in the former Tomten factory, winter 2022.
- Formerly: Tomten Fabrikker; Tomten A/S
- Company type: Aksjeselskap
- Industry: Consumer products
- Founded: 1907
- Defunct: 1990
- Fate: Acquired by Akzo; factory closed, brands sold
- Headquarters: Sandvika, Norway
- Products: Cleaning products, toiletries

Fabriken Tomten was a factory in Sandvika, Norway, that produced cleaning products and health and perfume articles. Established in 1907, it was originally a subsidiary of Tomtens tekniska fabrik of Gothenburg, founded in Jönköping in 1897, and was set up to establish the Swedish parent on the Norwegian market.

A relatively small producer with well-known brands, its Tomteskur was among Norway's best-selling detergents in the 1930s, with a market share of 70–80 percent. From 1960 the company built its own sales department, and Tomtegløgg and the Dutch enzyme detergent Biotex became well-known brands through its marketing in the 1960s and 1970s.

In 1973 the Dutch group Akzo took over the shares of Tomten's Swedish parent and with it the Norwegian company. The Sandvika factory was closed in 1990, and the same year the American brand company Sara Lee Corporation bought Akzo and thereby Tomten; Sara Lee later sold Tomtegløgg and a number of other brands to Orkla.

== Bibliography ==
- Hope, Svein Ola (2022). "Fabriken Tomten". Årbok for Asker og Bærum Historielag, no. 62.
