= Brønnøya =

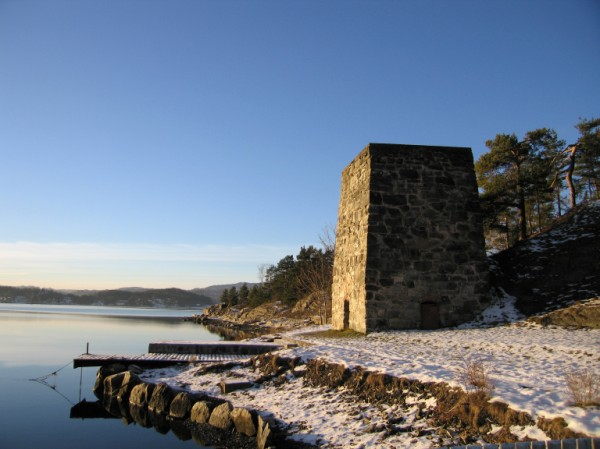
- The old lime kiln on Brønnøya

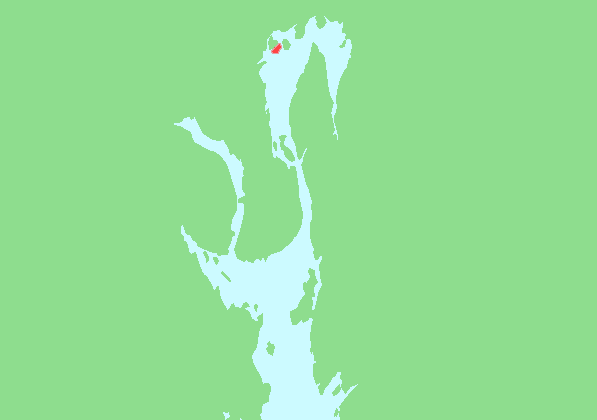
- Location of Brønnøya in Oslofjord

Geography
- Location: Oslofjord
- Coordinates: 59°51′26″N 10°32′17″E
- Archipelago: Vestfjorden
- Area: 1.38 km^{2} (0.53 sq mi)
- Highest elevation: 52 m (171 ft)

Additional information
- Official website: www.bronnoya.no

Brønnøya is an island in the western section of Oslofjord (Vestfjorden), within the borders of the municipality of Asker.

== Geography ==
The island is just beyond the upscale suburban construction of Nesøya, reachable across the Vendelsund sound by cable ferry during the summer and a pontoon bridge in winter. It is among the largest islands in the Vestfjorden archipelago and is surrounded by islands: To the east is Ostøya in Bærum, to the south is Langåra (Asker) and to the west the small islands with descriptive names such as Katterompa (Cat's Rear End), Torbjørnsøy, Furuholmen (Pine Island), and Spannslokket (Pail Lid). The island's geology was formed in the Cambrian Period and is rich with limestone.

== History ==
The island is recorded by name in sea charts from the early 16th century. The etymology of "Brønnøya" (variously spelled Brøndøen, Brønnøen, Brunneyr, Brunøen, Bryøen, Brundøen, and Bryndøen) stems from the presence of wells (Norwegian: brønn) on the island, the source of water with an unusual ability to stay fresh in storage. This was a coveted commodity for expeditions during the sailboat era. In the late 16th century, bishop Jens Nilssøn recorded that a well (now empty) on the eastern side of the island is said to have been identified by the presence of the Virgin Mary and still has the name Mariakilden. The name of the well may stem from the 14th century. Several other wells are extant on the island, and some served as freshwater sources for the inhabitants well into the 1960s.

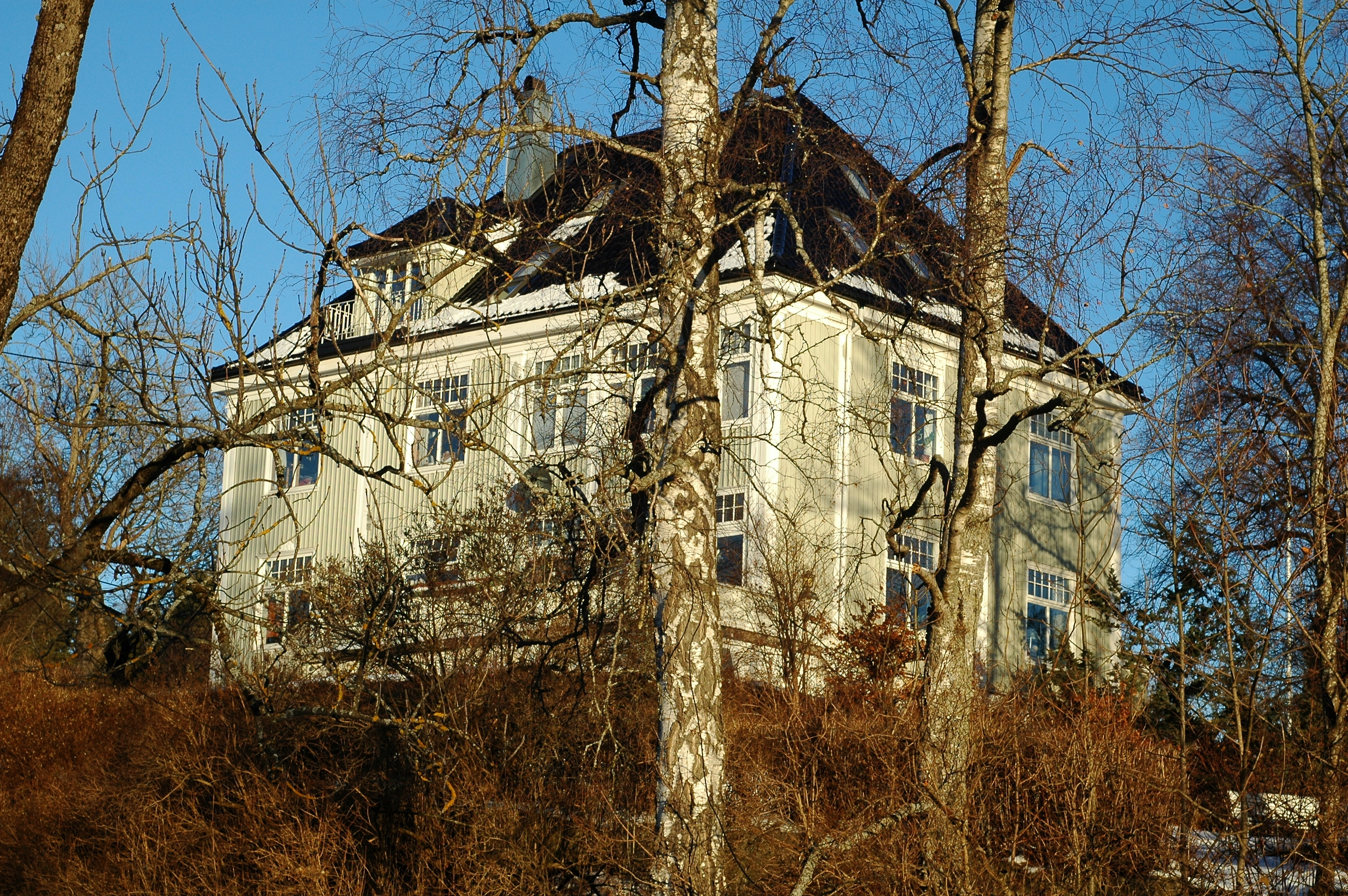
Main building on the old farm

Remains of two Nordic Stone Age settlements have been found on the island that may stem from 4000 BCE (when the tide was 40–50 meters higher than today), and there are traces of agricultural activity going back at least 1500 years. The island became part of the considerable estate known as Nesøygodset that was formed in the late 14th century following the Black Death

Recorded owners of the island include, in chronological order:

- Jon Toraldson (riksråd)
- Olaf Håkonson Stumpe
- Bo Pedersøn Flemming
- Holger Eriksen Rosenkrantz (in the Rosenkrantz family until 1663)
- Knud Frantzen, who sold much of the acreage in Nesøygodset, but seems to have held on to Brønnøya (1663-early 1700s)
- Bartolomeus Adamsen, who had been a tenant farmer and was related by marriage to the first known tenant farmer on the island, Nils Brønøen (early 1700s-1710)
- Adam Bartolomeussen, his son (1710–1724)
- Hans Christensen Aarhus Oust acquired the farm for 2000 riksdaler (1724-1724)
- Christen Hansen Aarhus, his son (1745–1781)
- Christian Christensen Aarhus, who separated the property from the farm on Ostøya(1783–1814)
- Marte Andersdatter, Christen's wife and her two children (1814–1822), when the farm and island were sold
- Haagen Andersen, who married Marte and bought the property (1822–1837)
- Christian Haagensen, their son, (1822–1860)
- Ander Haagensen, his younger brother (1860–1888)
- Maren Dorthea, his wife and children (1888–1890)
- Donato Brambani (1890–1907)
- Marie Plahte, at which point it became part of the farm at Høvik (1907–1916)
- Viktor Plahte, her son (1916–1928)
- Rudolf Myhre and Alf Monsen took over in 1928, at which point parcels on the island were sold

In 1826 the farm (also known as Brønnøya) had 216 dunams (53 acres) under cultivation.

The island was also the site of lime pits and kilns. There is evidence of limestone quarries going back to the 14th century. The industrialist Donato Brambani established a large scale lime kiln that was in full operation from 1892 to 1899. It was shut down in 1902, but a large kiln remains intact as one of the attractions of the island.

The island is within the postal code for Nesøya

== Zoning controversy ==
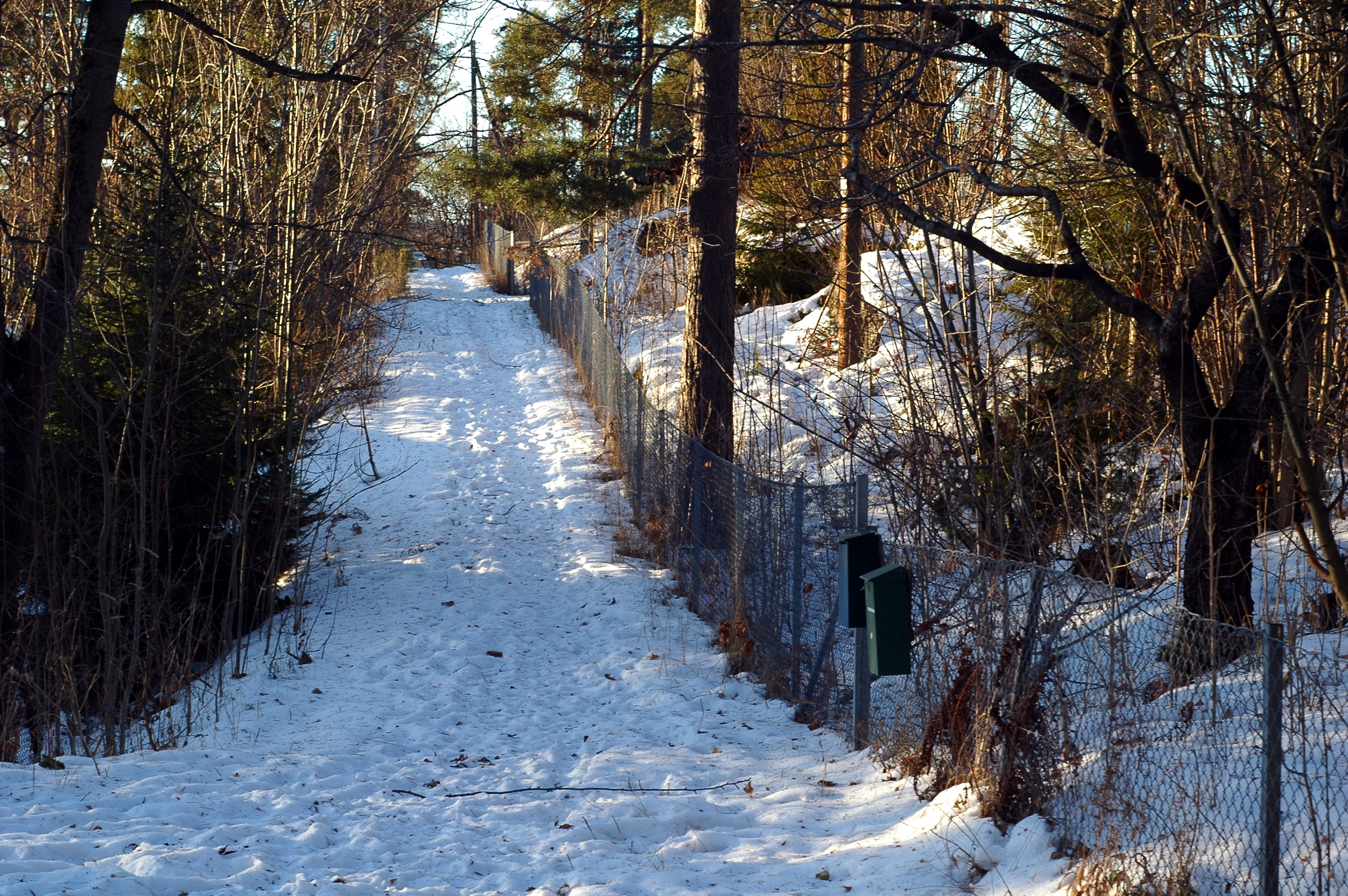
Residential pathway on the island

Since the island was subdivided in the 1920s, its use has evolved. In 1928, the island was regulated primarily for purposes of "villa residences with servant quarters in separate structures." A number of other requirements were also established, including minimum lot size (2 metric dunams), and common areas. This was progressive in its time, but the term "villa residence" left much open to interpretation, leading to controversy over time.

Although there is a general consensus that the island needs to maintain its unique character, there have, broadly speaking been two camps that have opposed each other on the means for preservation. They are represented in the public by two organizations: Brønnøyas Venner, known as Venneforeningen (the Friends of Brønnøya) and Brønnøya Grunneierforening, known as Grunneierforeningen (the property association).

The controversy about the zoning of the island reached its most intense level in the 1970s, but controversy persists to this day. In addition to the 16 lots that are legally approved as permanent dwellings, there are 34 that are de facto permanent homes for their residents. The central issue therefore relates to whether more of the island should be rezoned to permit permanent dwellings. Venneforeningen resists such regulation, insisting that the primary use of the island remain housing for leisure. Grunneierforeningen favors allow for more permanent dwelling, but under certain strict conditions to prevent urbanization and congestion.

There appears to be agreement that the island remain free of motor vehicle traffic. Some favor a permanent bridge to ease access; others feel this is a slippery slope toward allowing automobiles on the island.

A new zoning plan went into effect in 1995 that seemed to favor the conservationist leanings of Venneforeningen. However, issues persist with respect to use of municipal infrastructure, maintenance of the natural landscape, and environmental concerns.

== Access ==
As long as the entire island was owned by one party, access to the island was via private boat. During the winter, there would typically be roads over the ice, both for pedestrian traffic and carriages. There were accidents, and there are several recorded instances of drownings off the island. When Myhre and Monsen started selling lots on the island, public access was required. This took two forms: across the Vendel sound, and via scheduled ferry landings.

=== Vendel sound access ===
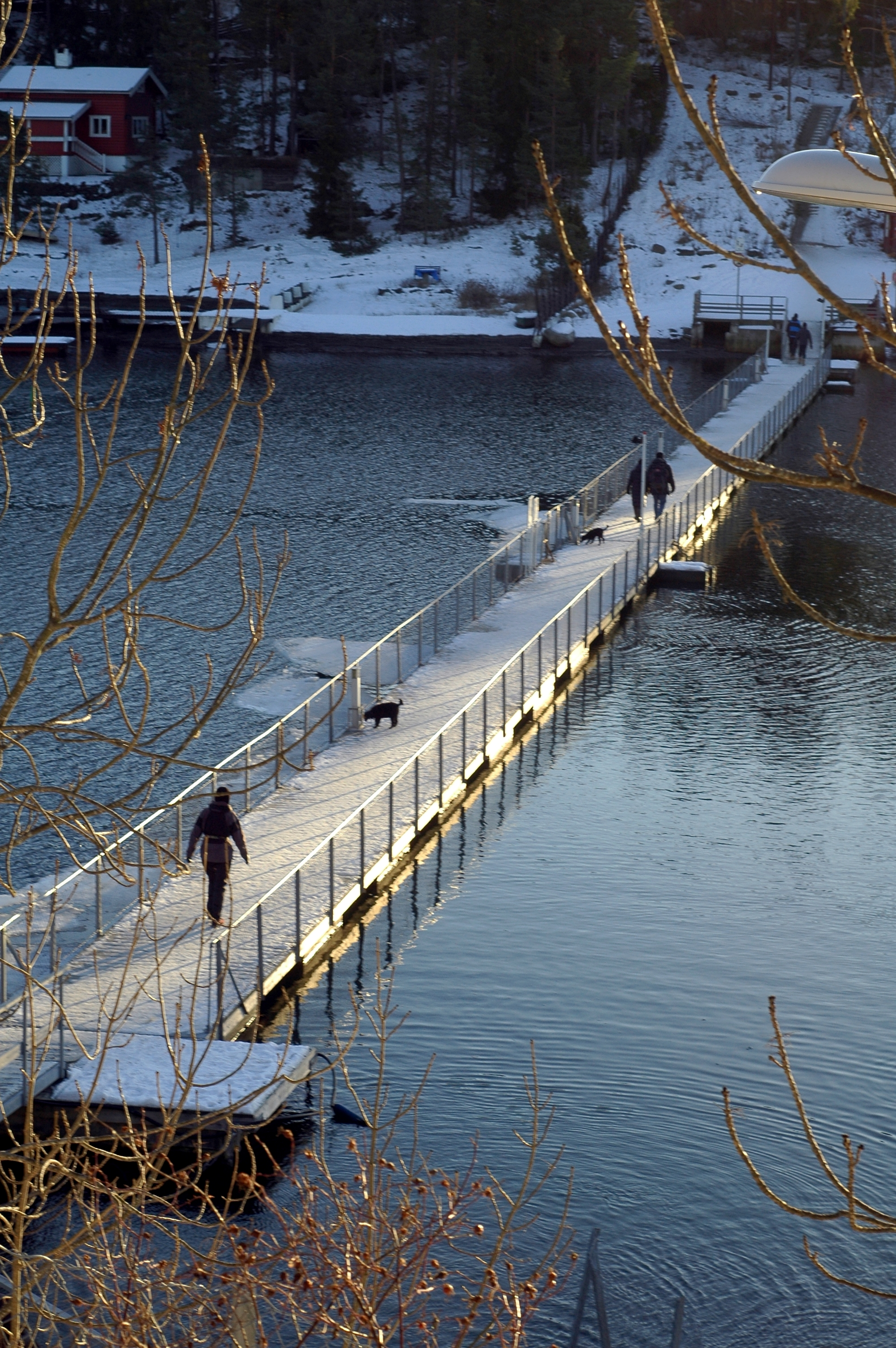
Pontoon bridge across Vendel Sound, seen from Nesøya

By 1928, when Myhre and Monsen started selling lots, the public road to the southern end of Nesøya was also complete. In return for room and board and a fee for passage, a ferryman would bring passengers across the sound as needed. It turned out to be difficult both to staff this position and to decide who the employer would be.

In 1953, the nursing home on the island was acquired by Jens H. Koefoed, who was impressed by the cable ferry between Ormøya and Padda in Oslo. In 1955 he set up the first cable ferry across the Vendel sound. He also installed a pontoon bridge that floated on railroad ties, yet without hand rails. This worked well when the sound was frozen, but when the ice thawed and broke, pedestrians usually had to run across the bridge to stay dry. The ties were presently replaced by empty oil barrels. By the 1960s, several forces converged to improve access. Both the municipality and private owners had taken steps to acquire harbor sites on the island, auto ownership and traffic was increasing, and there was increased interest in commuting between Oslo and Brønnøya. The municipality expropriated the lot needed to build a walkway from the bridge landing to the road on Nesøya, and the harbormaster approved the use of the cable ferry.

It soon became apparent that both the cable ferry and the pontoon bridge needed to be modernized. Replacing the barrels that sprung leak became an urgent but arduous routine, and the ferry was not able to handle pedestrian traffic at peak periods during the summer.

In 1973, Jak Haukvik, one of the island's long-term residents, engineered a new cable ferry based on a raft, rather than, boat design. Although it took more effort to operate, and particularly under windy weather conditions, it could hold far more passengers and was less likely to flip.

On Midsummer's in 1982, however, the cable ferry capsized, due to already significant overload, when a passenger leaped from the pier onto the ferry after it had departed. One person was seriously injured, and the resident association ("vel") was found liable. Since then, the ferry has been replaced with a new version, and the ferry is shut down during Midsummer.

=== Public ferry ===
For centuries, it was easier to travel the Oslofjord by sea than by land. By 1835 there was regularly scheduled ferry routes from Oslo (then Kristiania) to Sandvika. By 1890, the ferries "Vesta" and "Sartor" made scheduled stops at Brønnøya, on the northern end, with the ferries sailing through the Vendel sound.

In addition to the northern landing, three additional public landings were established on the island: the western landing, and then the eastern and southern landings. At one point, six separate ferries made regular stops at one or several of these landings. Even though sections of the fjord had naval mines, ferry traffic continued through World War II. In particular, the ferry D/S Sport was considered a faithful servant of the island's community.

But by 1952, ferry service had been reduced to the point that only one ferry provided regular service, and then with mixed reliability. The ferry "Silius" had a capacity of 150 passengers, which was not enough. Another ship, "Trollhaug" was added. It was fast but notoriously unreliable, and several other ferries afterwards continued to disappoint the community. In the spring of 1952 there was for a short time no ferry service between Oslo and the island.

By 1955, however, there were three reasonably reliable ferries in operation. In addition to "Silius," there was "Rigmor" and "Vestfjordbussen" that made regular stops at Brønnøya.

Service between Sandvika and Brønnøya between 1948 and 1968 was provided by Einar Andersen, who shuttled passengers on board a retired lifeboat (from Stavangerfjord) starting at 5:30 am until 10 pm.

In 1952, the ferry Rigmor started providing additional capacity for existing ships, but over the years the ship has become a virtual institution in the Vestfjorden archipelago.

== Nature ==
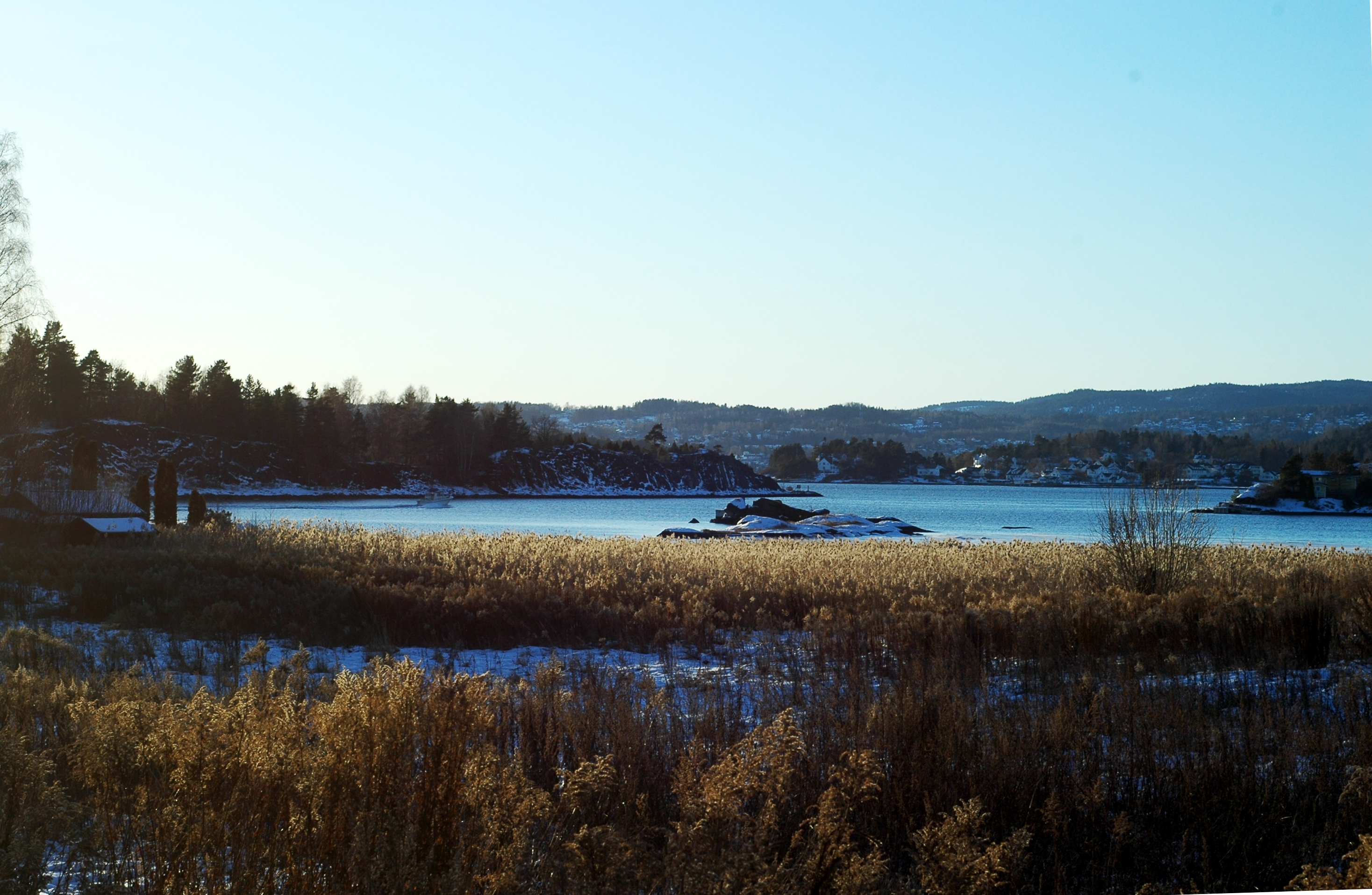
View west from Brønnøya

The island is also notable for its diverse flora, a result of sailships unloading ballast when loading quicklime. In the last 150 years, there have been found 147 redlisted species, of which 8 are critically endangered and 35 are endangered. There are several nature reserves on the island, including Viernbukta, where grey heron are sighted

Commonly seen plants on the island include: Valeriana sambucifolia, Geranium sanguineum, Geranium robertianum, Lotus corniculatus, Sedum acre, Hylotelephium maximum, Silene vulgaris, Silene uniflora, Potentilla erecta, and others. In the spring, the island is overrun with Hepatica nobilis and Anemone nemorosa.

== Brønnøya today ==
The island today consists of 362 private parcels of land. Of these, 16 are registered as permanent dwellings, and 261 are leisure dwellings.

The island is closed for motorized traffic all year. After an accident during celebrations in 1982, the cable ferry is closed the night of Midsummer. There are three ferry landings on the island that have seasonal and sporadic service. Beaches are public and maintained by the island communal organization. The island's future is a matter of some controversy. Some want to make it more accessible for a larger share of permanent residents and more tourist and weekend traffic; others feel that it should remain somewhat remote and protected.
