= Borøya =

Borøya or Borøy may refer to:

== Places ==
- Borøya, Bærum, an island in the municipality of Bærum in Akershus county, Norway
- Borøya, Kristiansand, an island in the municipality of Kristiansand in Agder county, Norway
- Borøya, Tvedestrand, an island in the municipality of Tvedestrand in Agder county, Norway
