= Løkke Bridge =

Løkke Bridge: Løkke bro; Løkke bru
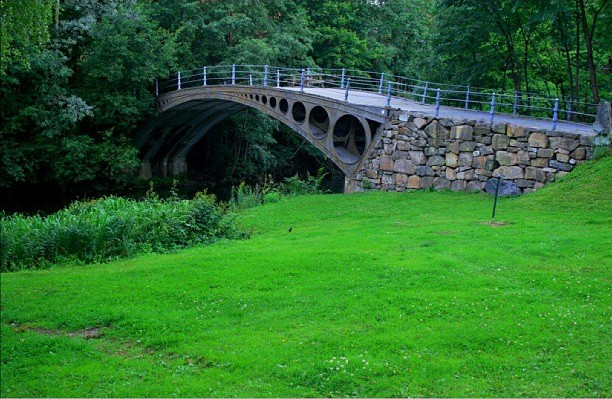
- Coordinates: 59.8928°N 10.5189°E
- Crosses: Sandvikselva

Characteristics
- Total length: 23 metres
- No. of spans: 1

History
- Construction end: 1829
- Rebuilt: 1977
- Replaced by: New bridge

Location
- Interactive map of Løkke Bridge

Løkke Bridge (Norwegian: Løkke bro; Nynorsk: Løkke bru), across the Sandvikselva river at Sandvika, is the first cast iron bridge in Norway. It is the subject of a painting by Claude Monet.

== History ==
The bridge was cast at the ironworks at Bærums Verk and installed in 1829. It has a span of 23 metres. The spandrels have ten circular holes, in decreasing sizes.

In 1977, to allow for road widening, the bridge was moved upstream by several metres, where it now serves as a cycle- and footbridge, parallel to its road-bridge replacement, which carries Elias Smiths vei.

== Painting ==
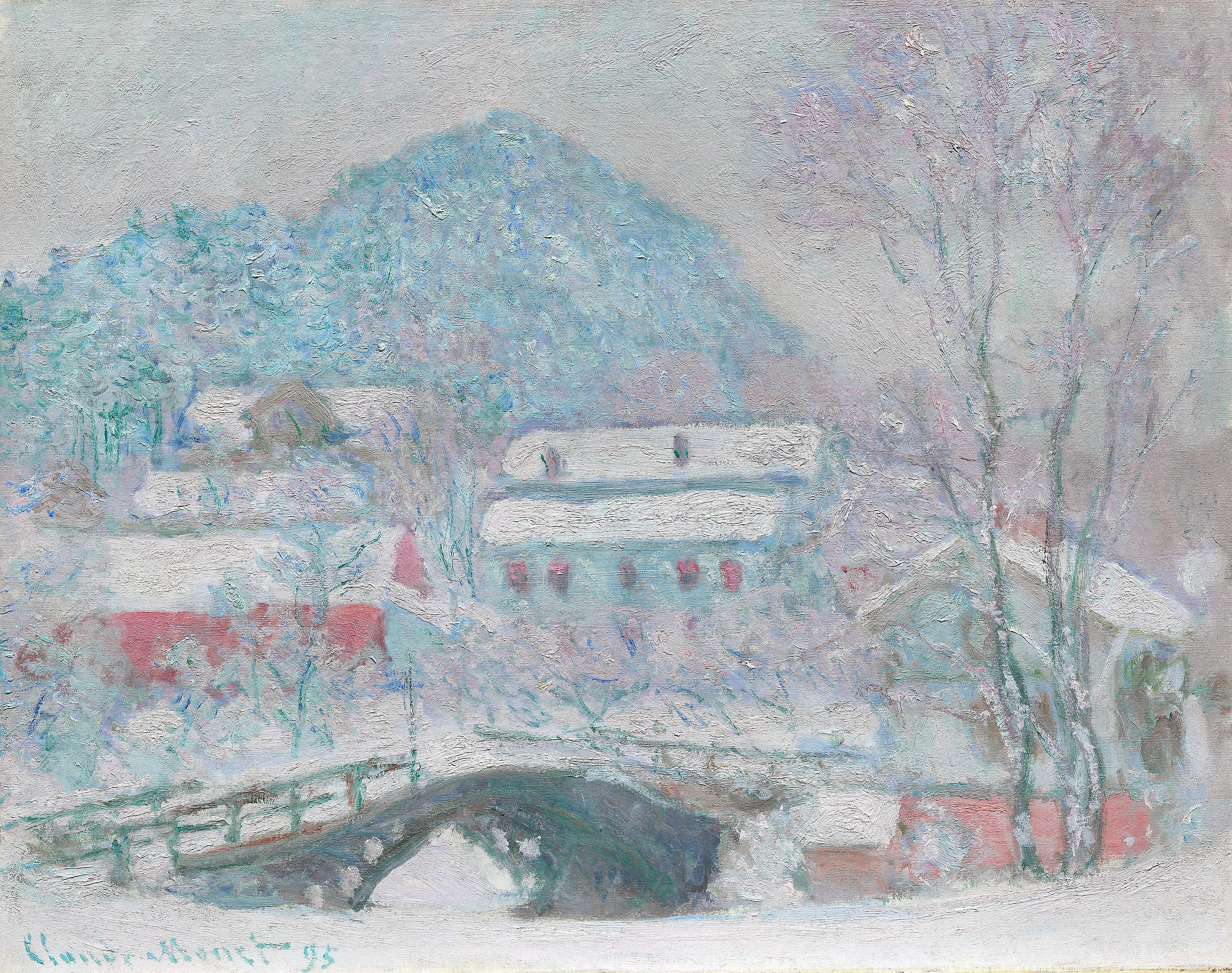
Sandvika, Norway (Claude Monet, 1895)

In 1895, while visiting Sandvika during a two month trip to visit his stepson Jacques Hoschedé, who lived in Oslo (then called Christiania), Claude Monet made an oil painting of the bridge. It was one of 29 works he painted on the trip, six of which feature scenes in Sandvika. The 73.4×92.5 cm work is now in the Art Institute of Chicago. Since being donated to them by a private owner in 1961-1963, it has been exhibited in Paris, Copenhagen, Stockholm, and Japan.
