= Ostøya =

Island in Bærum, Norway

Native name: Oustøen
- Location within Norway

Geography
- Coordinates: 59°52′2″N 10°34′14″E
- Archipelago: Vestfjorden
- Area: 2.3 km^{2} (0.89 sq mi)
- Area rank: 2
- Highest elevation: 54 m (177 ft)

Administration
- Norway

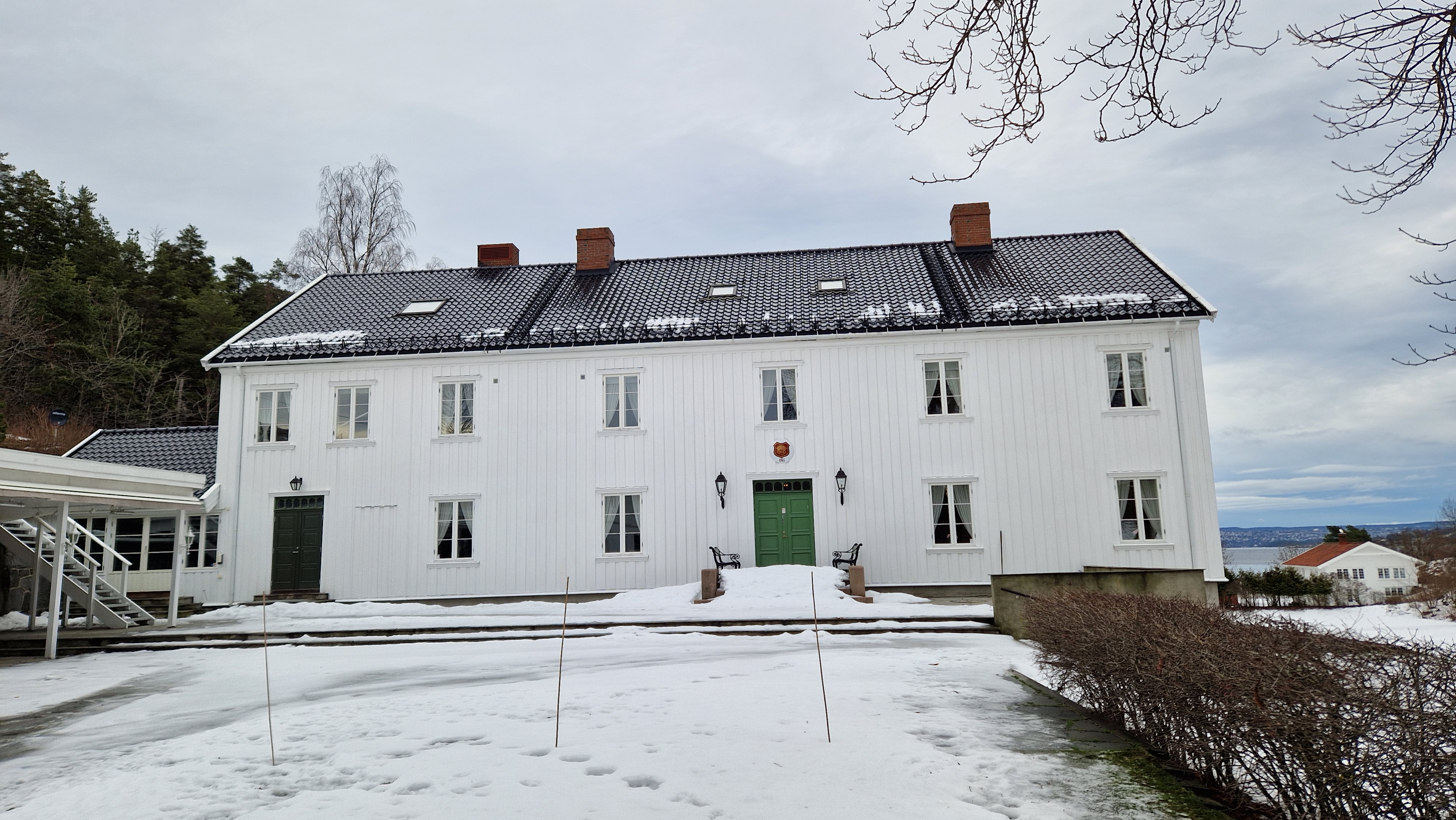
A large house in Ostøya

Ostøya is an island in the western section of Oslofjord (Vestfjorden), within the borders of the municipality of Bærum. It is the second largest island in the Oslo basin, after Nesøya. It is adjacent to the municipal border with Asker, where Nesøya and Brønnøya are to its northwest and southwest, respectively. Within Bærum, Borøya is to the north, Kjeholmen to the northeast, and Grimsøya to the east. To the south is Gåsøya.

== History ==
At some point the island was split in two. The island is named after the farm that is situated on it. The etymology of Oust, or Ost is uncertain. O. Rygh claims the etymology is unknown but that the farm derives its name from the island's original name. Others speculate that it may have an Old Norse origin related to ouste, in the sense of claiming new land.

In 1396, the (pre-Reformation) diocese in Oslo was listed as the owner of farm (then spelled Ost) and the island, and by 1557 (after the Reformation) it was owned by the crown and spelled Oust. In 1791, the owner is listed as Hans Haagensen Tveter, and his descendants still own the main farm. In accordance with practice at the time, they also took the last name Oust. They successfully petitioned the minister at Haslum church for their own gravesite, citing the distance to the church and the need to quickly bury cholera victims. A royal grant was given.

In 1899 a significant portion of the island (Lille Oust) was sold for recreational summer houses.

== Nature reserve ==
Two areas of the island have been set aside as nature reserves:

- Oust naturreservat was established in 2002 and consists of 128,5 hectares, of which 5,5 hectares are marineland.
- Syd Oust naturreservat was established on June 27, 2008 and consists of 17 dunams (4.2 acres), of which 7 dunams (1.7 acres) is on land.

== Golf and country club ==
Oustøen Country Club was privately established in 1965 and has about 700 members. The golf course originally had nine holes, but was expanded to a full 18-hole golf course in 1995. The club house is based on the main farmhouse on the Oust farm. The original farmhouse from 1791 burned to the ground in 1998, but has been restored. There is a restaurant on the premises.

== Today ==
The island is accessible only by sea. Aside from the main farm and country club, there are a few summer residences on the island, based on former tenant farms there. The island is within the postal code for Snarøya.
