= Danmark (islet) =

Islet in Norway

Coordinates: 59°53′26″N 10°32′00″E

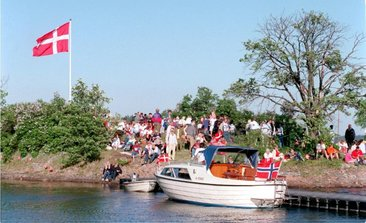
Danes celebrating Denmark's constitution day (5 June) on Danmark.

Danmark (English: Denmark) is an islet located near Sandvika in the Municipality of Bærum, Norway.

While the original meaning is not exactly verified, the name of the islet reflects Norwegians' (friendly) joking about the relatively small geographical size of Denmark proper. Like Denmark, this islet is flat, small, and located overseas south of Bærum. The name predates 1814, when the personal union known as Denmark–Norway was dissolved. In a sale of land in the 1780s, it was mentioned that the sale included 'a little island called Denmark' (Danish: en lille ø kaldet Danmark).

== Literature ==
- Ness, Tore. 2008. Navn i fjorden : Oslo – Asker – Bærum. Oslo: Orion Forlag AS. ISBN 978-82-458-0847-6
- Borgen, Per Otto. 2006. Asker og Bærum leksikon. Drammen: Forlaget for by- og bygdehistorie. ISBN 82-91649-10-3
