= Løkkeås Tunnel =

Road tunnel in Norway

Coordinates: 59°53′42″N 10°31′26″E

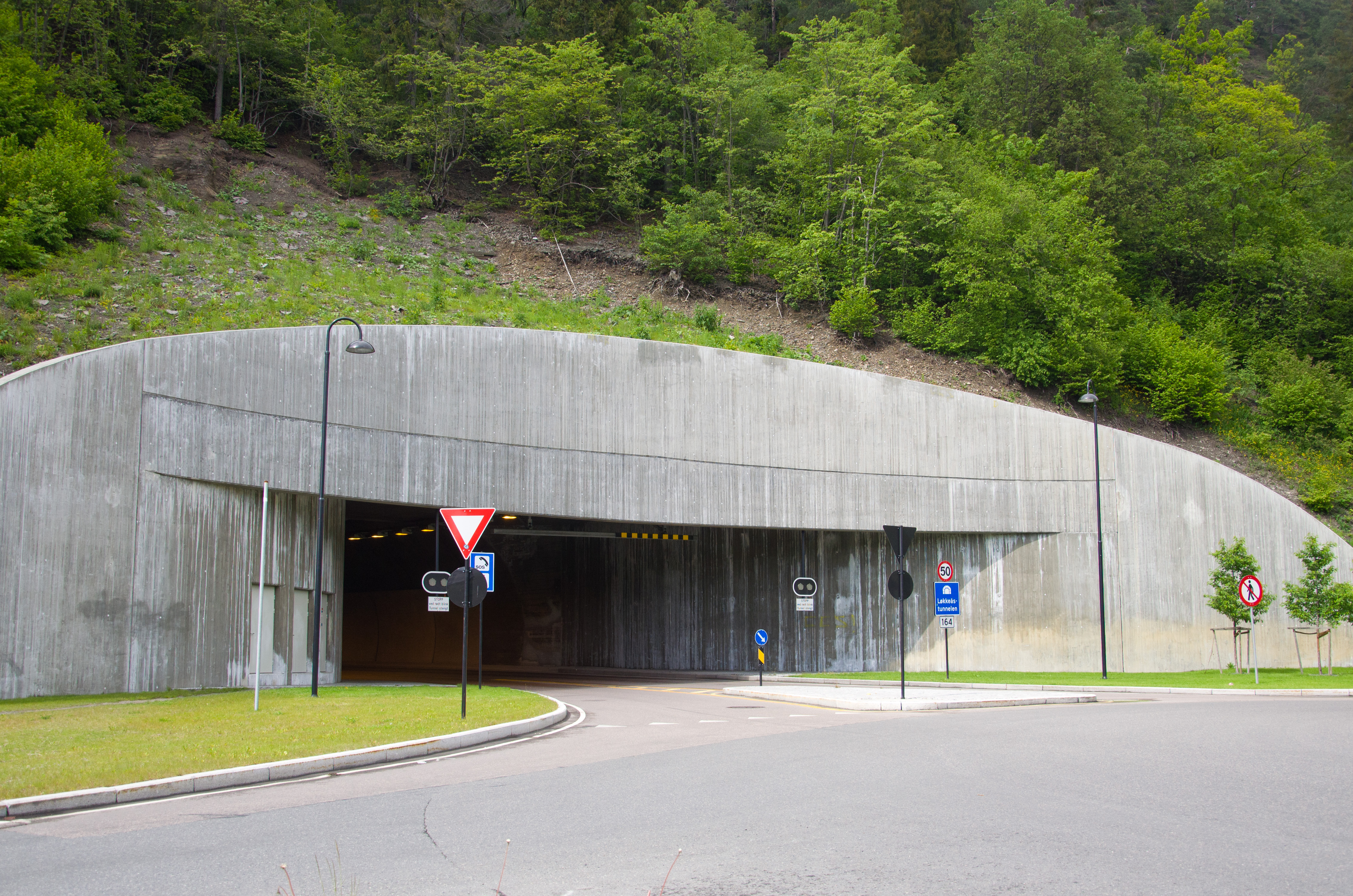
Løkkeåstunnelen.jpg

The Løkkeås Tunnel (Norwegian: Løkkeåstunnelen) is a road tunnel that runs under Løkkeåsen in Sandvika, Norway. It is a part of a Norwegian National Road 164 spur running from Engervannet north to join the main road. It is approximately 190 metres long.
