= Kalvøya, Bærum =

Island in Bærum, Norway

Coordinates: 59°53′04″N 10°32′20″E

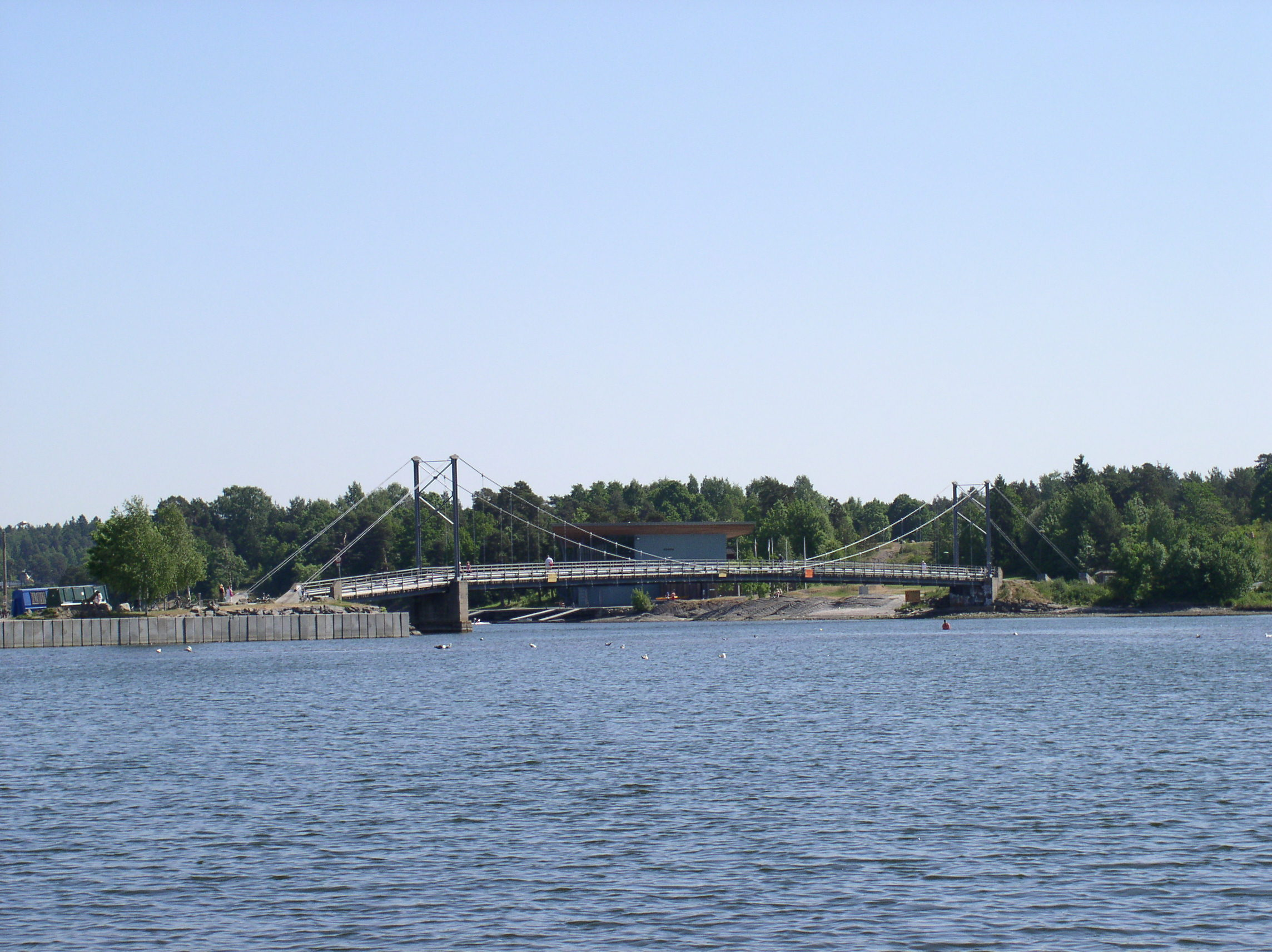
Bridge to Kalvøya

Kalvøya (English: Calf Island) is situated in the inner Oslofjord. The island is close to Sandvika in Bærum and to the south of it. The island has been connected to the mainland by a suspension bridge to Kadettangen since 1962 or 1963.

Kalvøya is one of the most popular bathing spots in Bærum. On the far east side of the island there is a nude beach.

Kalvøya plays host to an annual soccer tournament for kids and a children's festival. The festival Øyafestivalen, first held in 1999, also has its roots there, before its growing popularity brought about its move to Tøyen Park in Oslo in 2014.

An annual music festival, the Kalvøyafestivalen, was held between 1971 and 1998 on the island where several international performers played live over the years, including Billy Idol, Iggy Pop, Leonard Cohen, Morten Abel, and The September When.
