= Sandvikselva =

Sandvikselva Sandvikselva, Løxa
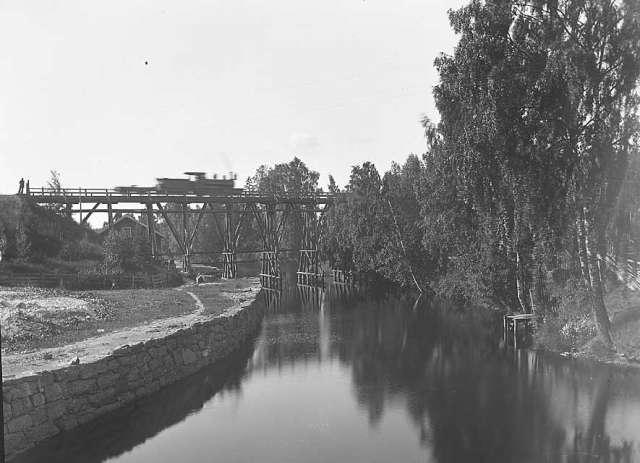
- A quiet section of the river
- Etymology: named after the area Sandvika

Location
- Country: Norway
- Region: Østlandet
- Municipality: Bærum

Physical characteristics
- Source
  - location: Bærum, Norway
- Source confluence: Wøyen
  - coordinates: 59.908308°N 10.483489°E
- Mouth: Kadettangen
  - location: Sandvika, Akershus, Norway
  - coordinates: 59.8882479°N 10.5272198°E
  - elevation: 0 m (0 ft)
- Length: 4.5 km (2.8 mi)

Basin features
- River system: Sandviksvassdraget
- Tributaries
  - left: Lomma
  - right: Isielva

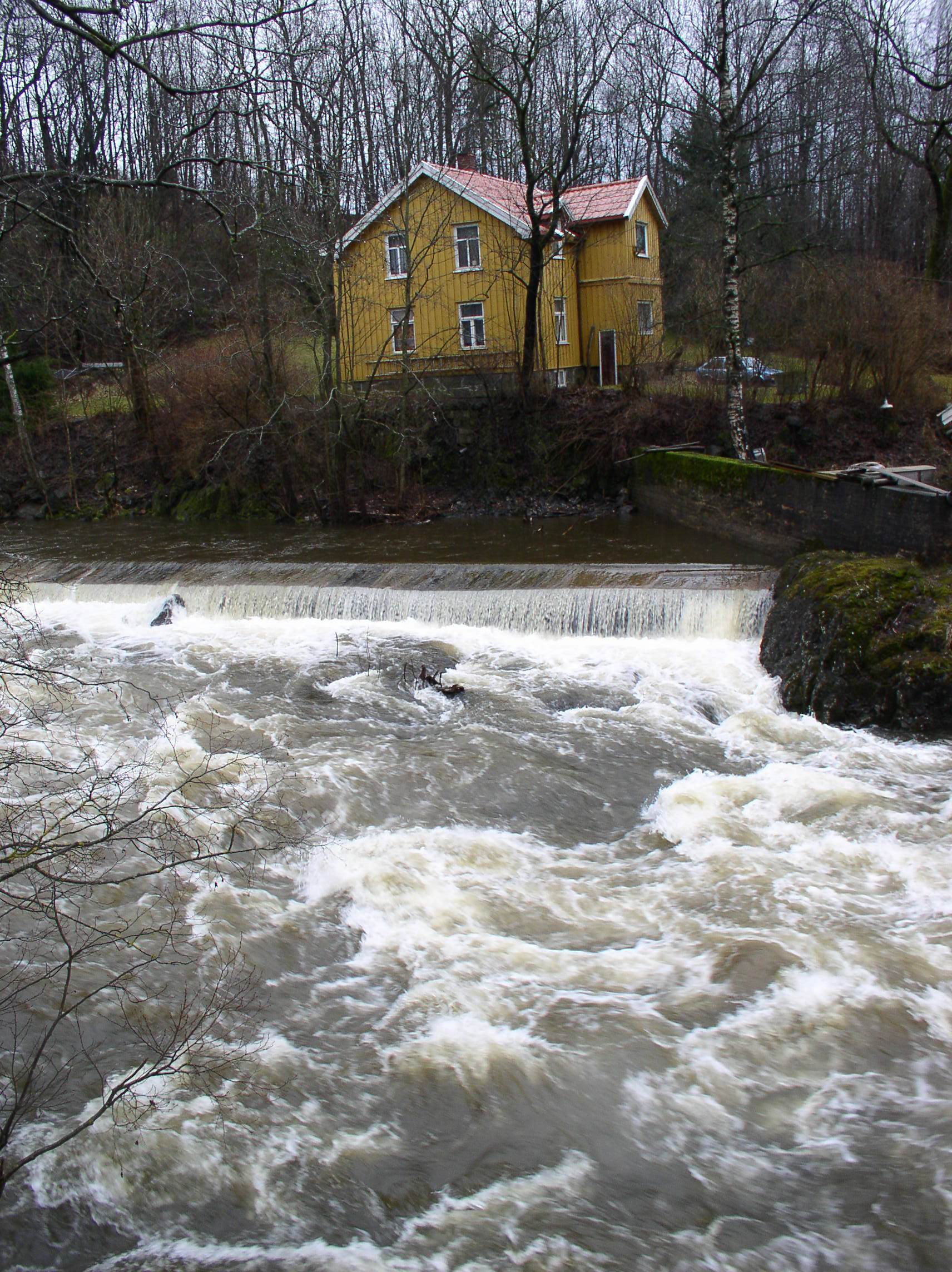
The Sandvikselva at Olsens Sykkelverksted

The Sandvikselva, formerly known as Løxa, is a river in Bærum, Norway, originating at the intersection of the rivers Lomma and Isielva at Wøyen. The river flows into the Oslo Fjord 4.5 km south at Sandvika, though the center of the city, where it is crossed by the historic Løkke Bridge, the first cast iron bridge in Norway. At the mouth there are three bridges over the river.

There were formerly water mills for industry along the line, including at Franzefoss for Franzefoss Bruk. The river regularly floods, and landslides have occurred. There is a measuring station for water levels and pollution at Bjøregårdsvingen.

Sandvikselva is the premier trout river of the Oslo Fjord, and a community of dedicated volunteers invest much time and energy to preserve the conditions for the fish to be able to travel up the river to spawn each autumn.
