= Nesøya, Akershus =

Island in Norway

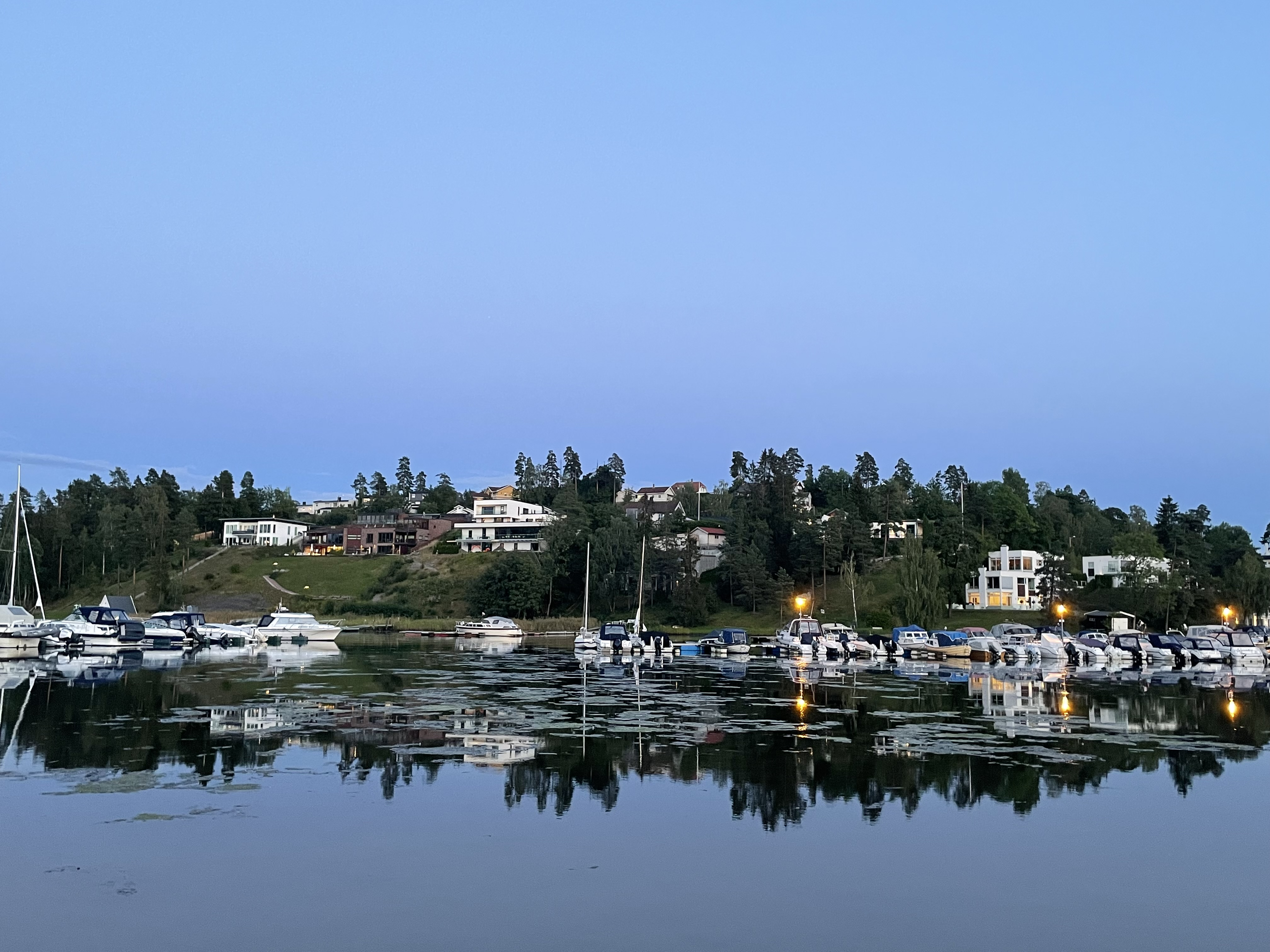

- Location of the island Nesøya, Akershus (Norway)

Geography
- Location: Asker, Akershus
- Coordinates: 59°51′48.7″N 10°31′13.5″E
- Area: 0.05 km^{2} (0.019 sq mi)

Administration
- Norway
- County: Akershus
- Municipality: Asker

Nesøya is a small island in the municipality of Asker, Norway. It is linked to the mainland via a bridge.

The island is known for having a number of celebrities and members of the Norwegian financial elite among its residents. It also one of the wealthiest areas in the entire country, with some properties having been sold for close to and even over $10,000,000. The mean net worth per resident was $575,816 in 2016, and the mean income was $103,601.

Much of the eastern part of the island is a nature reserve.

The island most likely got its name from the farm Nes on the mainland. This farm is assumed to have been one of the oldest ones in the district.
