= Sandvika =

- City
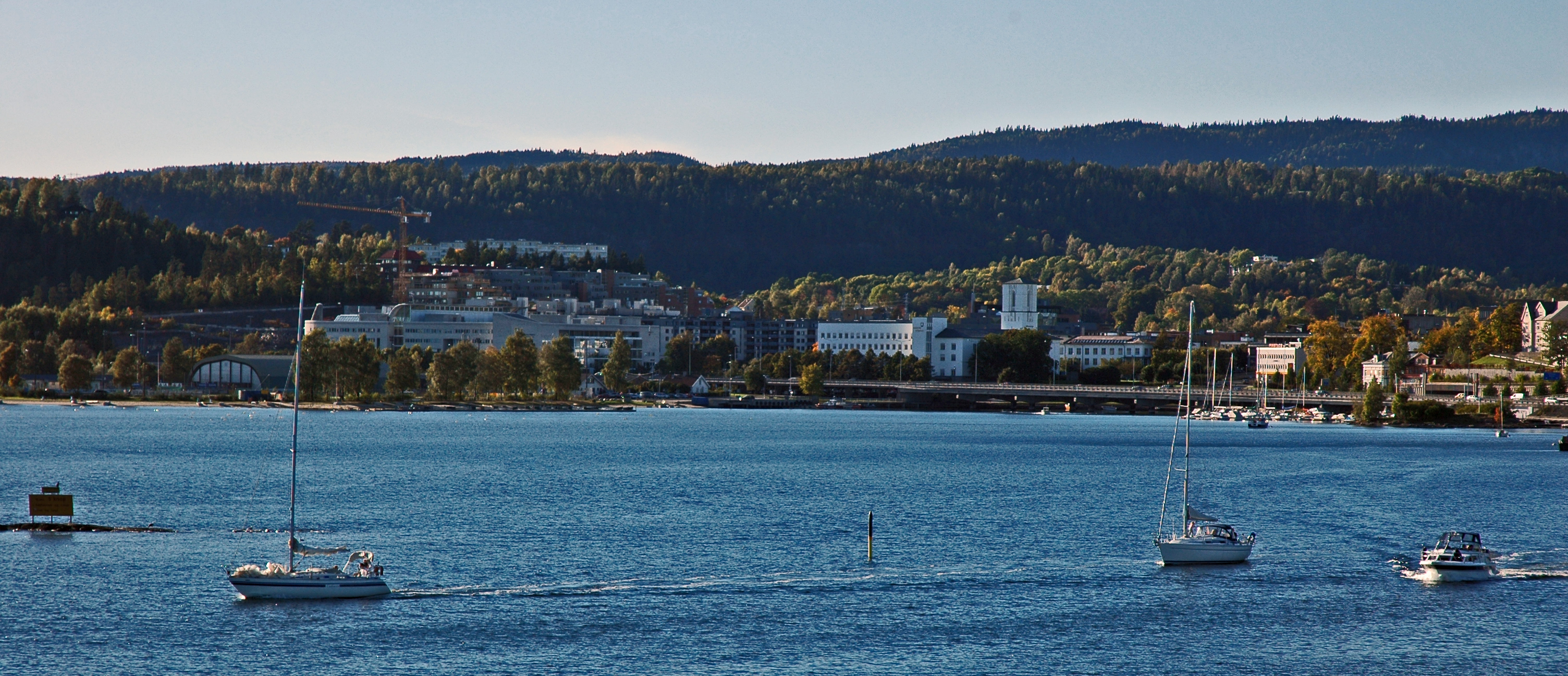
- Sandvika seen from Høvikodden

- Location within Norway
- Coordinates: 59°53′N 10°31′E
- Country: Norway
- County: Akershus
- Municipality: Bærum
- City status: June 4, 2004
- Elevation: 12 m (39 ft)
- Time zone: UTC+1 (CET)
  - Summer (DST): UTC+2 (CEST)

Sandvika is the administrative centre of the municipality of Bærum in Norway. It was declared a city by the municipal council in Bærum on 4 June 2003.

Sandvika is situated approximately 15 kilometers (9.3 mi) west of Oslo. It is the main transportation hub for Western Bærum, and has a combined bus and railway station. Sandvika is also one of the stops along the route of the Airport Express Train. Sandvika also has Scandinavia's largest super mall, Sandvika Storsenter, with 190 stores and a total area of 60,000 square meters or 650,000 square feet. On 13 March 2013, the previously pedestrianized main street was opened for car traffic and on-street parking. Sandvika used to be home to the BI Norwegian Business School, which moved to new surroundings in Nydalen, Oslo in August 2005. The building was, after some refurbishing, converted into the home of Sandvika High School.

Another school in Sandvika is Norges Realfagsgymnas NRG (Norwegian school of maths and science), a combined secondary school and high school. It lies in Skytterdalen and offers education in maths and science.

The nearby island of Kalvøya is a place for recreation. The Boat Sport House is located on Kalvøya, and is used by Bærum KK and Bærum RK. It also hosted one of the best known Norwegian music festivals Kalvøyafestivalen.

A small islet in Sandviksbukta, outside Sandvika, is called Danmark. Danes who live in the area join every year on 5 June Denmark's national day to celebrate. There has been debate on the Danish flag on "Danmark", but currently it still is there.

== In art and music ==
Claude Monet visited in early 1895. During his stay he painted several views of the town and the surrounding landscape, with the mountain ridge Kolsås featuring in many of the paintings either in the background or as the primary subject. Perhaps the most well known of the paintings from this visit is 'Sandviken Village in Snow' which features the Løkke bridge in the foreground with Kolsås in the background. The bridge still stands in Sandvika.

== Gallery ==
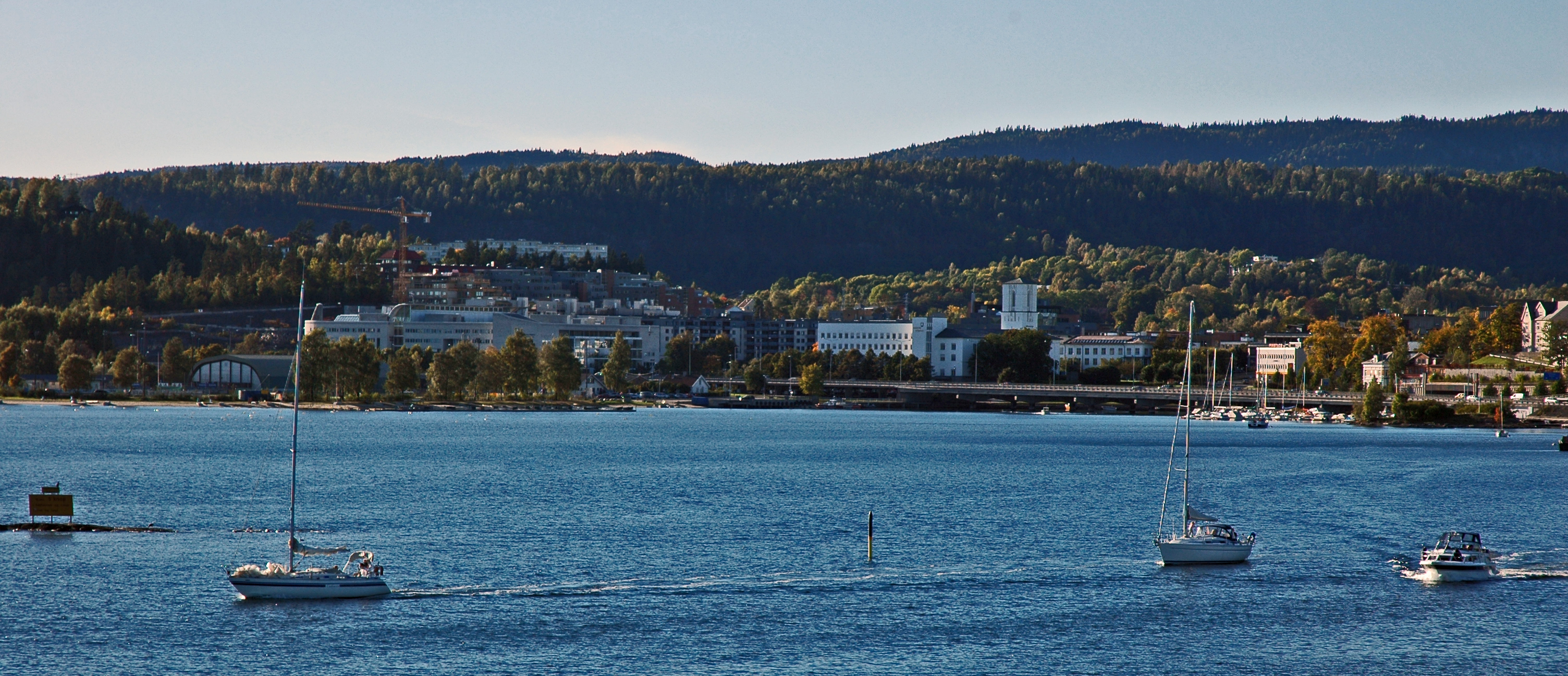
Viewing towards Sandvika

Kalvøya Bridge towards Sandvika, taken during April sunset

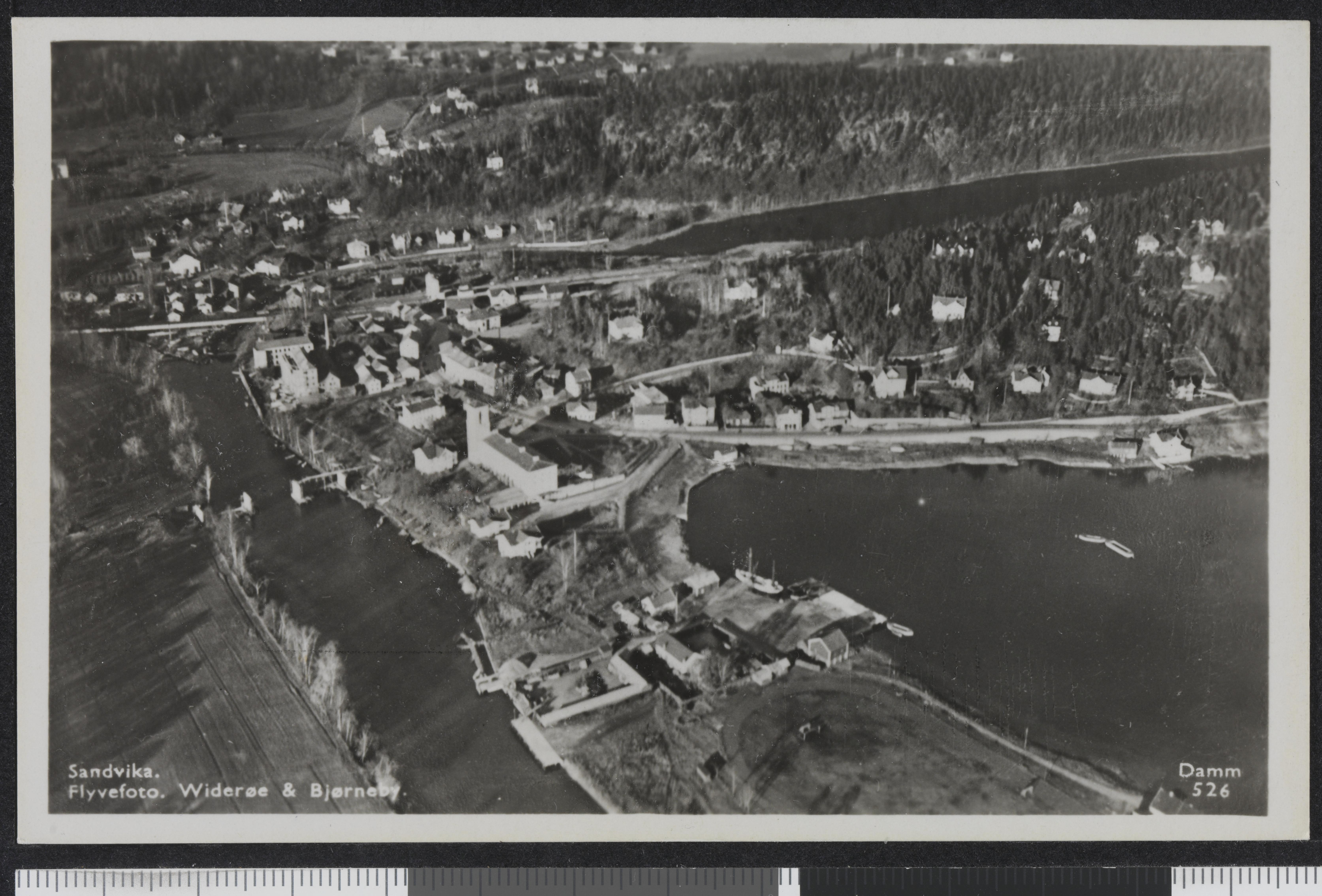
Sandvika in the mid-1930s
