= IKEA =

Swedish multinational conglomerate

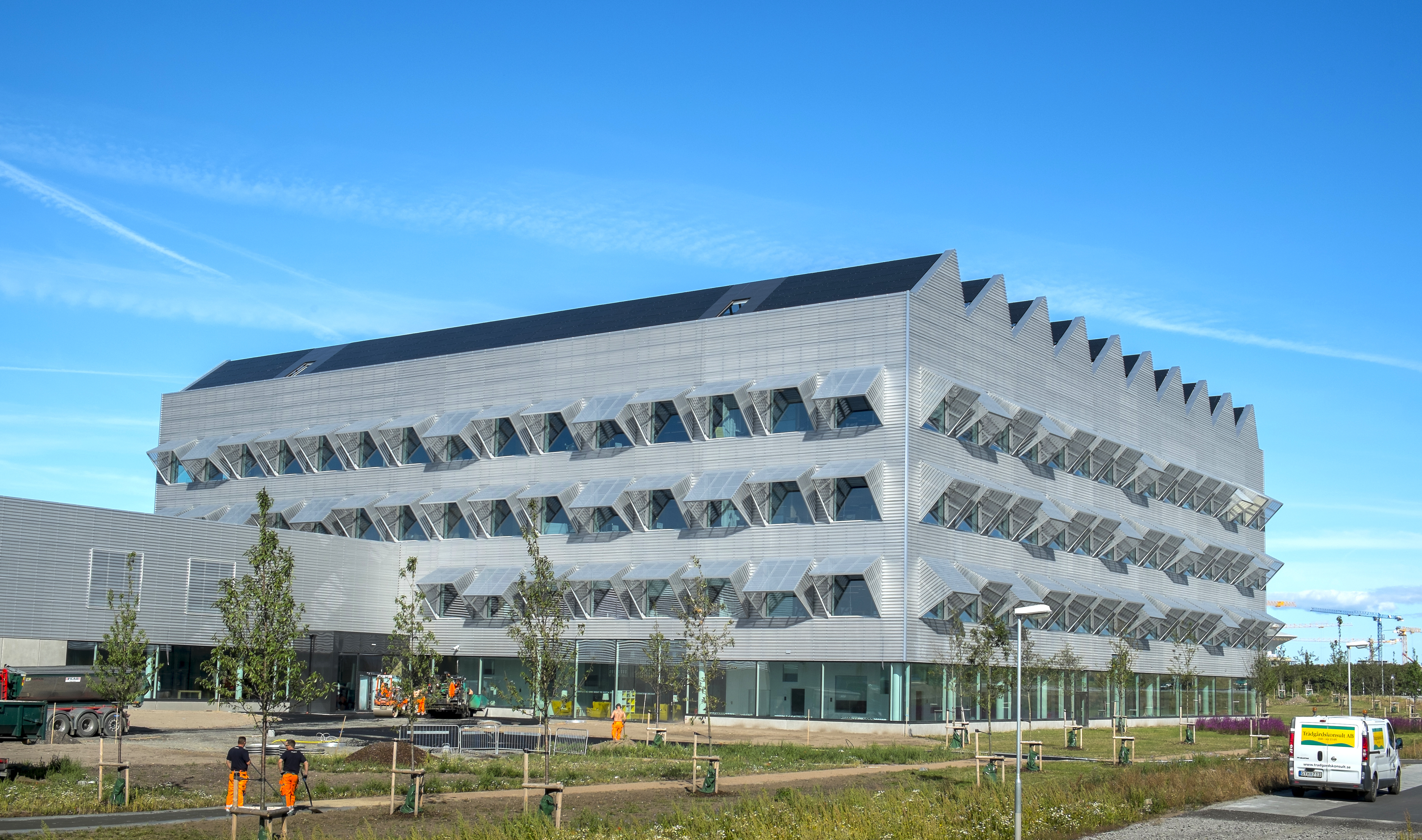
- IKEA Hubhult, head office and global meeting place for all of IKEA’s operations, Malmö, Sweden
- Trade name: IKEA
- Type: Private
- Industry: Retail
- Founded: 28 July 1943; 83 years ago in Sweden
- Founder: Ingvar Kamprad
- Headquarters: Älmhult, Sweden; IKEA of Sweden AB (operational) Malmö, Sweden; IKEA of Sweden AB (operational) Delft, Netherlands; Inter IKEA Systems B.V. (legal/franchisor) Leiden, Netherlands; INGKA Holding B.V. (retail group)
- Number of locations: 504 (2025)
- Area served: Worldwide
- Key people: Jesper Brodin (chairman and CEO of INGKA Holding); Jon Abrahamsson Ring (chairman and CEO of the Inter IKEA Holding)
- Products: Ready-to-assemble furniture; Homeware; Food products
- Revenue: ▼€44.6 billion (2025)
- Number of employees: 220,000 (2025)
- Parent: Inter IKEA Group; INGKA Holding
- Website: inter.ikea.com; ingka.com; ikea.com (retail)

IKEA (/aɪˈkiːə/ eye-KEE-ə, Swedish: [ɪˈkêːa]) is a multinational conglomerate founded in Sweden that designs and sells ready-to-assemble furniture, household goods, and other related services.

IKEA was founded in 1943 by Ingvar Kamprad, and has been the world's largest furniture retailer since 2008. The brand name is an acronym of the initials of the names of Ingvar Kamprad, the founder, Elmtaryd, the family farm where Kamprad was born, and Agunnaryd, Kamprad's hometown in Småland, southern Sweden.

The company is primarily known for its modernist furniture designs, simple approach to interior design, and immersive shopping concept, based around decorated room settings within big-box stores, where customers can interact with products. In addition, the firm is known for its ready-to-assemble model of furniture sales, continuous product development, and attention to cost control, elements which have allowed IKEA to establish lower prices than its competitors.

IKEA's operational hub is located in Älmhult, in Småland, Sweden, where much of its core operations are based, including product development, design, range management, and global supply chain and sourcing. It is also the site of the first IKEA store and the IKEA Museum. To support these operations with better international accessibility, IKEA established Hubhult in Malmö. Opened in 2015, this facility serves as a major corporate meeting and digital hub, housing large portions of the company's retail management, commercial leadership, and global web operations. IKEA is owned and operated as a series of not-for-profit and for-profit corporations collectively known and managed as Inter IKEA Group and Ingka Group. The IKEA brand itself is owned and managed by Inter IKEA Systems B.V., a company incorporated and based in the Netherlands.

More than 500 IKEA stores operate across 60 countries and three territories, (Note: Hong Kong, Macau and Puerto Rico) and in fiscal year 2024, €45.1 billion worth of IKEA goods were sold. All IKEA stores worldwide are operated under franchise from Inter IKEA Systems B.V. (except for IKEA Delft, which is owned by Inter IKEA Systems B.V.), which handles branding, design, manufacturing, and supply. Ingka Group operates the majority of IKEA stores as a franchisee and pays royalties to Inter IKEA Systems B.V. Some IKEA stores are also operated by independent franchises. The IKEA website contains about 12,000 products and there were over 4.6 billion visitors to IKEA's websites in FY2024.

== History ==
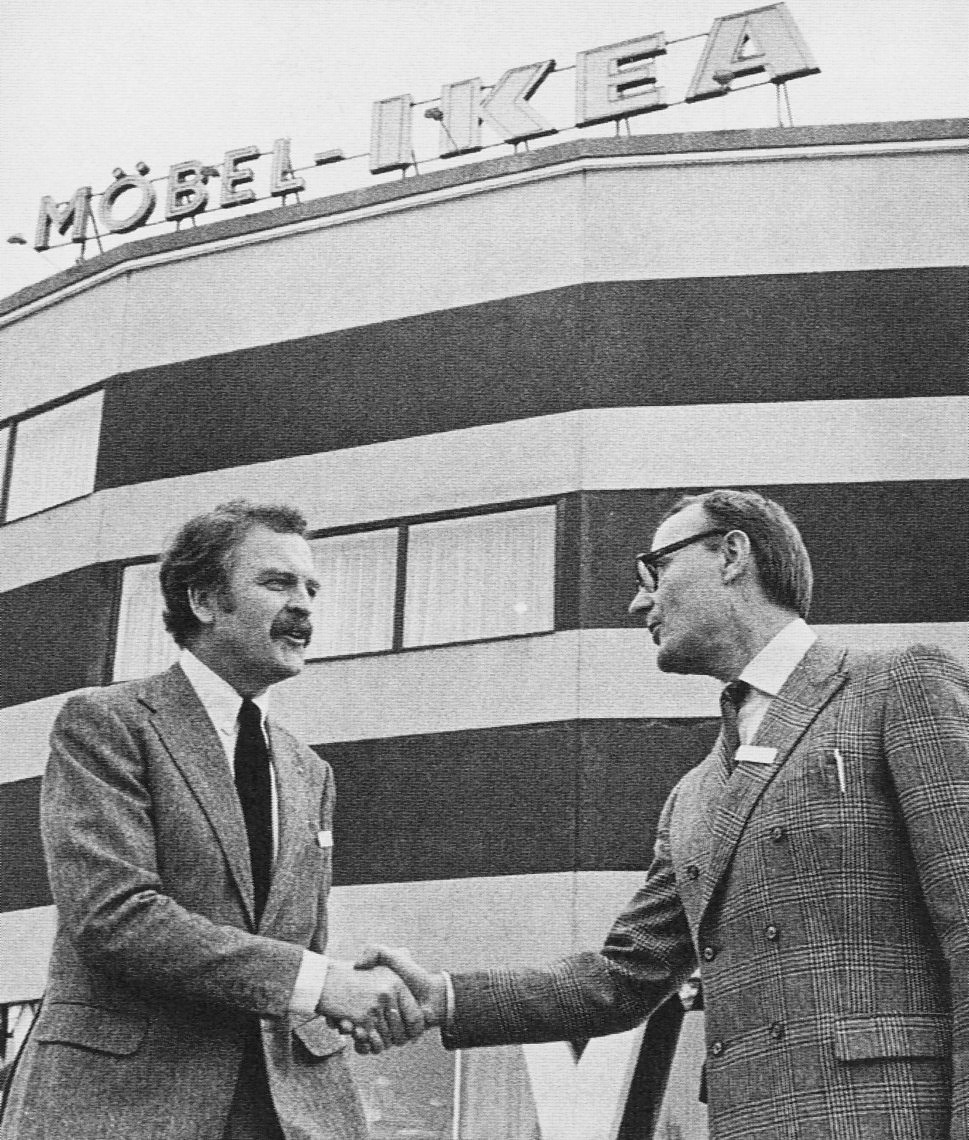
IKEA founder Ingvar Kamprad (right) shakes hands with Hans Ax, IKEA's first store manager, in 1965

In 1943, the 17-year-old Ingvar Kamprad founded IKEA as a mail-order sales business and began to resell furniture five years later. The first store was opened in Älmhult, Småland, Sweden on 28 October 1958, under the name Möbel-IKÉA (möbel meaning "furniture" in Swedish). IKEA is an acronym standing for Ingvar Kamprad, the founder's name; Elmtaryd, the farm where he was born; and the nearby village of Agunnaryd where he was raised.

Map of countries with IKEA stores

The first stores outside Sweden were opened in Norway (1963) and Denmark (1969). The stores spread to other parts of Europe in the 1970s, with the first store outside Scandinavia opening in Switzerland (1973), followed by West Germany (1974), Japan (1974), Australia, Hong Kong (1975), Canada (1976), Singapore, Spain and the Netherlands (1978). IKEA further expanded in the 1980s, opening stores in countries such as France (1981), Belgium (1984), the United States (1985), the United Kingdom (1987), and Italy (1989). Germany and the United States (incl. Puerto Rico), with 55 stores each, are the company's biggest markets.

IKEA entered Latin America in February 2010, opening in the Dominican Republic. As for the region's largest markets, on 8 April 2021, a store was opened in Mexico City. In August 2018, IKEA opened its first store in India, in Hyderabad. There are now stores in Bengaluru and Mumbai.

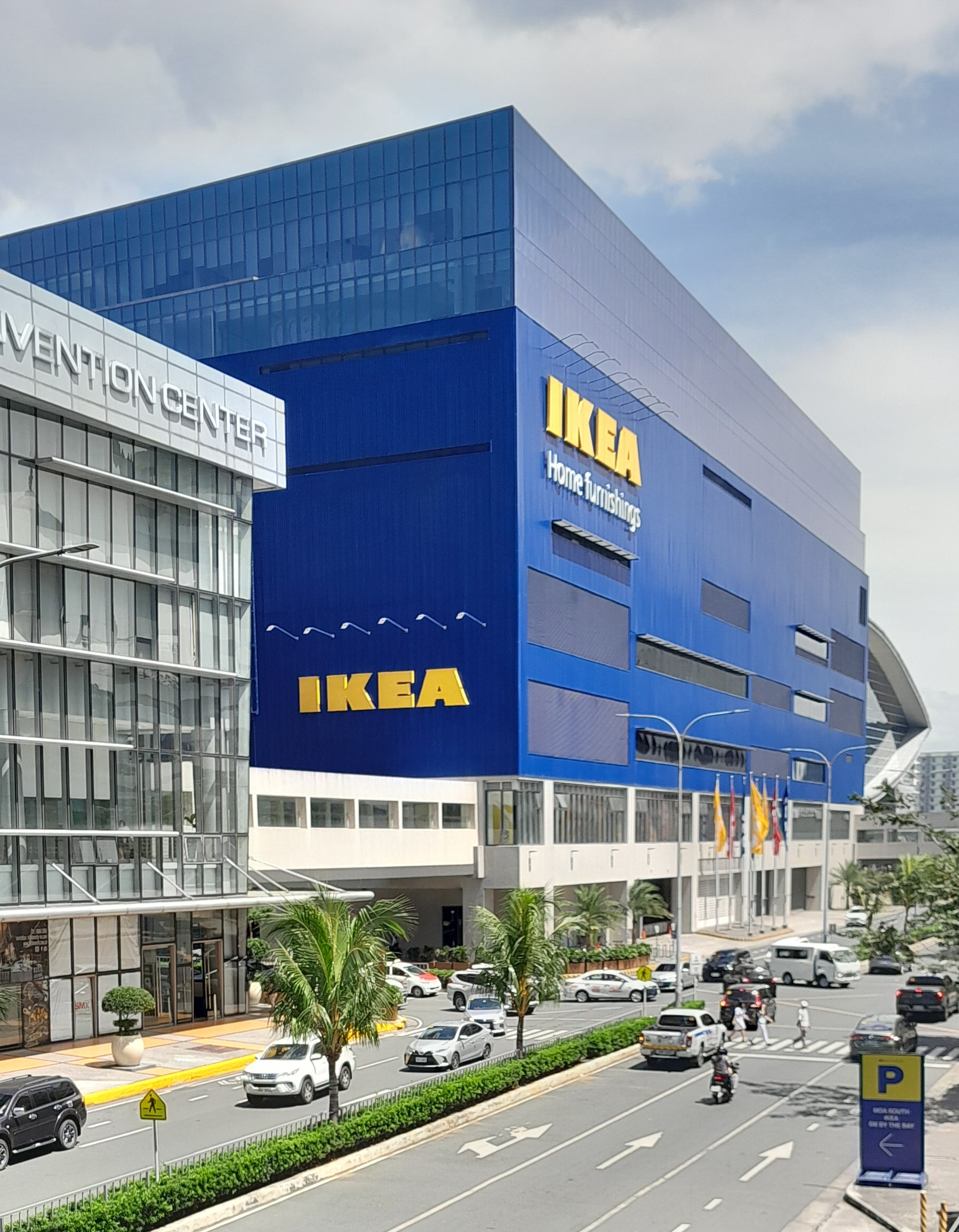
The world's largest IKEA store is located in Pasay, Metro Manila, Philippines

In November 2021, IKEA opened its largest store in the world, measuring 65,000 square metres (700,000 sq ft), in the Philippines, at the Mall of Asia Complex in Pasay City, Metro Manila.

In March 2022, IKEA announced the closing of all 17 stores in Russia, resulting from the 2022 Russian invasion of Ukraine. Because of the ongoing war and unimproved situation in Russia, IKEA said on 15 June that it would sell factories, close offices and reduce its workforce. Later it became known that IKEA does not plan to sell its business but expected to return to Russia within two years. By October 2022, IKEA laid off about 10,000 Russian employees. In September 2023, the MEGA chain of 14 supermarkets, then owned by Ingka, was bought by the Russian Gazprombank.

IKEA was hit hard by COVID-19 due to lockdowns across the world. As a result of fallen demand, its annual catalogue ceased publication after 70 years in print. The prices of its products have risen significantly in 2022 due to rising costs and inflation. In April 2022, IKEA shut down one of its stores in Guiyang when sales took a significant hit from the pandemic. Because of strict COVID-19 lockdowns in China, IKEA closed another store in Shanghai by July 2022.

On 10 August 2022, IKEA opened its first store in Chile, the first store in South America. Another store opened in Colombia in September 2023 in Bogotá.

On 1 September 2026, IKEA cut prices by up to 28% on 1500 products in Europe in order to "woo customers hit by the rising cost of living".

=== First store opening in each location ===
This list includes only standard IKEA Stores, excluding IKEA Pick-up points, and Plan & order locations.

1958–1980

Year	Country
1958	Sweden; Current stores: 20
1963	Norway; Current stores: 7
1969	Denmark; Current stores: 6
1973	Switzerland; Current stores: 10
1974	Germany (Note: In Eching, then West Germany); Current stores: 54
1974	Japan (Ceased 1986)
1975	Australia; Current stores: 10; Hong Kong (Note: Then British Hong Kong); Current stores: 4
1976	Canada; Current stores: 15
1977	Austria; Current stores: 8
1978	Netherlands; Current stores: 13; Singapore; Current stores: 3 Spain; Current stores: 20

1981–2000

Year	Country
1981	France; Current stores: 36; Iceland; Current stores: 1
1983	Saudi Arabia; Current stores: 4
1984	Belgium; Current stores: 8 Kuwait; Current stores: 2
1985	United States; Current stores: 52
1987	United Kingdom; Current stores: 22
1989	Italy; Current stores: 21
1990	Hungary; Current stores: 3 Poland; Current stores: 12
1991	Czech Republic (Note: In Prague, then part of Czechoslovakia); Current stores: 4 United Arab Emirates; Current stores: 4
1991	Yugoslavia (Ceased 1992)
1992	Slovakia (Note: In Bratislava, then part of Czechoslovakia); Current stores: 1
1994	Taiwan; Current stores: 8
1996	Finland; Current stores: 5 Malaysia; Current stores: 4
1998	China; Current stores: 33
2000	Russia (Ceased 2022)

2001–2020

Year	Country
2001	Greece; Current stores: 6 Israel; Current stores: 5
2004	Portugal; Current stores: 5
2005	Turkey; Current stores: 8
2006	Japan; Current stores: 14
2007	Romania; Current stores: 3 Cyprus; Current stores: 1
2009	Ireland; Current stores: 1
2010	Dominican Republic; Current stores: 1
2011	Bulgaria; Current stores: 1 Thailand; Current stores: 4
2013	Qatar; Current stores: 1 Lithuania; Current stores: 1 Egypt; Current stores: 2
2014	Jordan; Current stores: 1 Croatia; Current stores: 1 Indonesia; Current stores: 7 South Korea; Current stores: 5
2016	Morocco; Current stores: 2
2017	Serbia; Current stores: 1
2018	India; Current stores: 6 Latvia; Current stores: 1 Bahrain; Current stores: 1
2020	Macau; Current stores: 1

2021–present

Year	Country
2021	Ukraine (Suspended); Slovenia; Current stores: 1 Mexico; Current stores: 3 Puerto Rico; Current stores: 1 Philippines; Current stores: 1
2022	Oman; Current stores: 1 Chile; Current stores: 2 Estonia; Current stores: 1
2023	Colombia; Current stores: 3
2025	New Zealand; Current stores: 1

=== Collaborations ===
The YXSTABY gaming collection (2026), designed in collaboration with Xbox and IKEA in Bratislava, Slovakia

Beginning in the late 1970s, IKEA expanded beyond internal product development by adopting strategic brand partnerships and limited-edition collections to reach new consumer demographics, enter new technical sectors, and explore creative design directions. IKEA's early history with external collaborations began in 1978 through a partnership with the Swedish textile collective 10-gruppen. This initial project proved that guest designers could bring fresh, vanguard styles to IKEA's affordable home furnishings without disrupting mass production. To continue working with outside creators, IKEA launched its PS product line in 1995, inviting guest designers to create modern furniture that could still be mass-produced cheaply.

During the late 2010s, the company increasingly entered high-fashion, lifestyle, and toy markets through high-profile creative alliances. IKEA collaborated with British designer Ilse Crawford in 2015 for the SINNERLIG collection, which prioritized natural materials such as cork, bamboo, seagrass, and mouth-blown glass over synthetic components, followed by a 2017 partnership with Danish design house HAY for the YPPERLIG series. In 2018, IKEA collaborated with Hollywood fashion activist and stylist Bea Åkerlund on the gothic-glam OMEDELBAR collection. Expanding into streetwear culture in the same year, IKEA released the SPÄNST collection with designer Chris Stamp, which introduced the company's first skateboard alongside minimalist home furnishings. IKEA launched the limited MARKERAD collection with Off-White founder Virgil Abloh in 2019. That same year, IKEA collaborated with audio hardware company Sonos to develop the SYMFONISK line of integrated speakers and home furnishings.

The company partnered with luxury fragrance brand Byredo in 2020 for the OSYNLIG candle collection, and with the Lego Group that same year to launch the BYGGLEK line of storage boxes designed for play. In 2021, IKEA collaborated with British fashion designer Dame Zandra Rhodes to release the KARISMATISK home decor collection. The following year, the company launched the OBEGRÄNSAD, music-focused furniture and lifestyle collection with the electronic music trio Swedish House Mafia. A major series of design partnerships followed in 2023, including the BASTUA wellness collection with Finnish design house Marimekko, the VARMBLIXT lighting series with designer Sabine Marcelis, and the ÖMSESIDIG limited collection of party tableware, decorations, and textiles, developed in collaboration with nine Latin American creatives across design, fashion, architecture, and art.

IKEA expanded into social digital campaigns, collaborating with Swedish singer Zara Larsson in 2021 on "FiftyFifty", a digital card game for Instagram designed to promote domestic equality.

In the gaming and entertainment, IKEA launched its first line of dedicated gaming furniture and accessories in 2021, in partnership with Asus Republic of Gamers. Expanding further into digital media, IKEA Japan partnered with The Pokémon Company in 2026 to launch an interactive promotional campaign across both physical and digital spaces. In retail locations, stores set up Pokémon-themed display rooms for shoppers, while in the life-simulation game Pokémon Pokopia, IKEA created a virtual "IKEA Island" where players could visit custom-furnished locations designed by actual store employees. Later that same year, IKEA established an official partnership with Microsoft's Xbox division to manufacture a dedicated line of Xbox-themed furniture, ergonomic seating, and lifestyle home accessories.

== Store layout ==
=== Traditional store layout ===
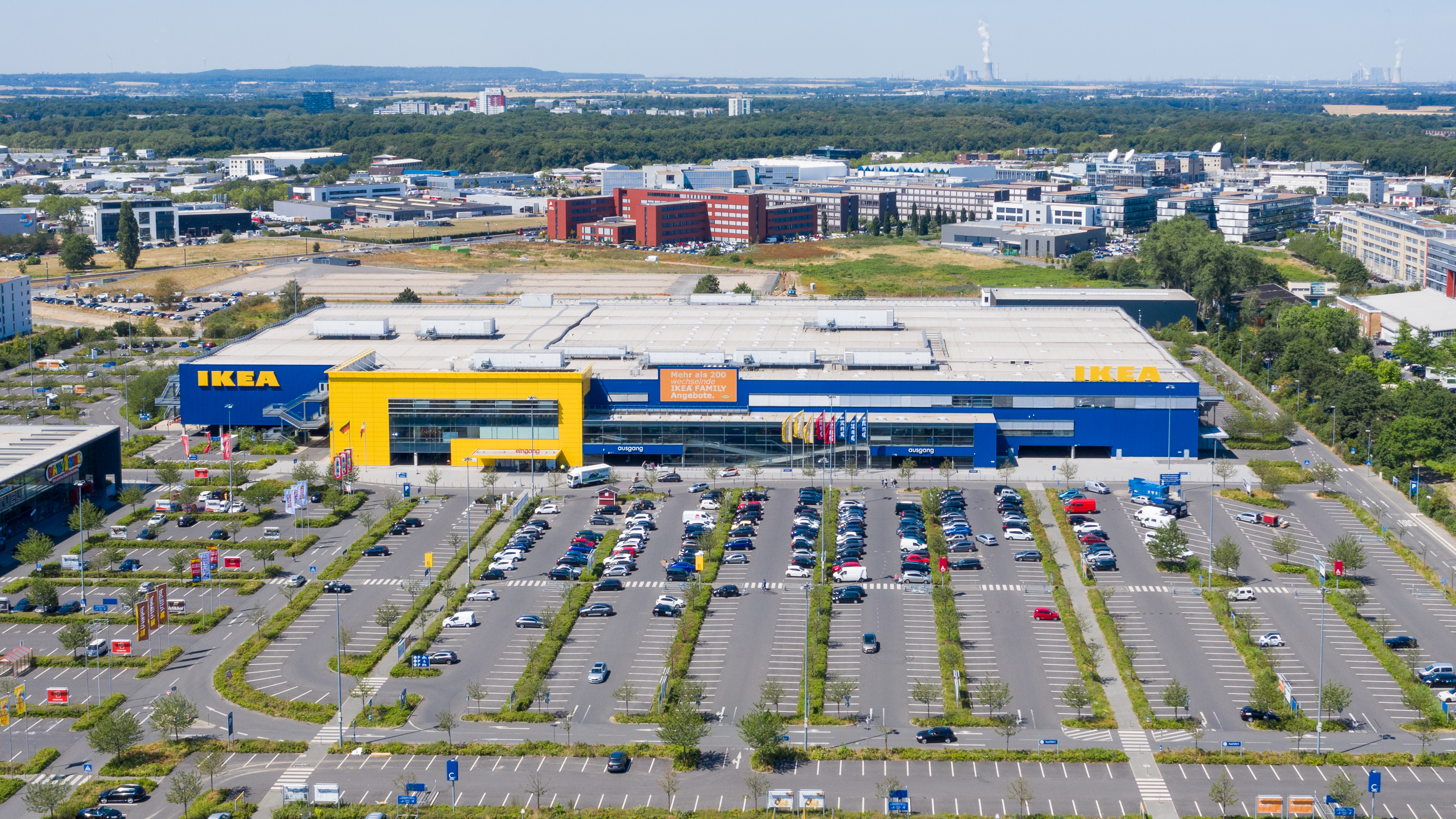
IKEA store in Cologne, Germany

IKEA stores are typically blue buildings with yellow accents – Sweden's national colours. They are often designed in a one-way layout, leading customers counter-clockwise along what IKEA calls "the long natural way", designed to encourage the customer to see the store in its entirety (as opposed to a traditional retail store, which allows a customer to go directly to the section where the desired goods and services are displayed). There are often shortcuts to other parts of the showroom.

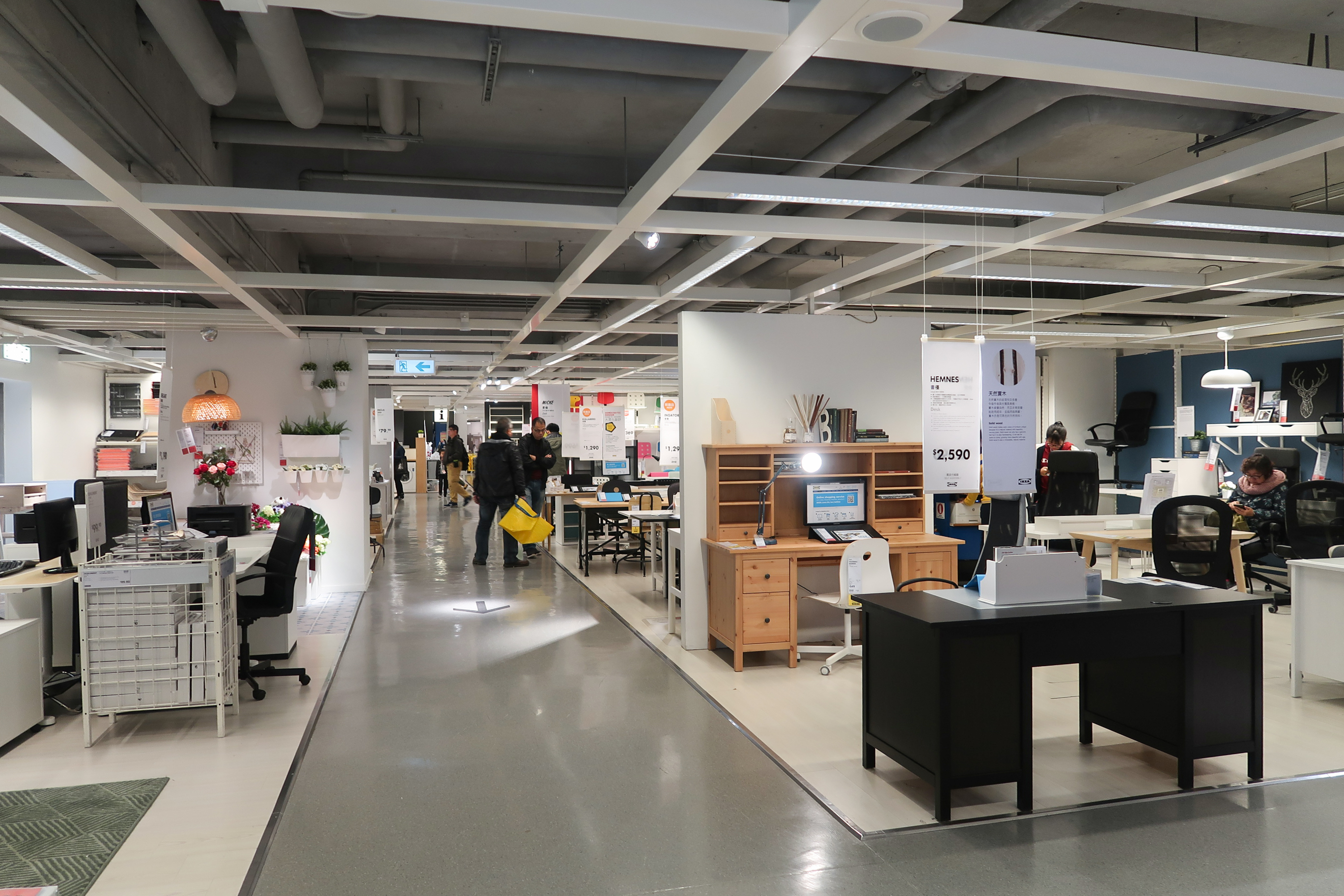
Interior of an IKEA store in Hong Kong

The sequence first involves going through the furniture showrooms, making note of selected items. The showroom usually consists of simulated room settings where customers can see the actual furniture in use, e.g., a living room with a sofa, a TV set, a bookcase, and a dining table, accessorized with plants, cushions, rugs, lamps, plates, glasses, and cutlery. Showroom sections are usually displayed in the order of the rooms of a house: living rooms, dining rooms, kitchens, bedrooms, and children’s rooms. The customer then collects a shopping cart and proceeds to an open-shelf "Market Hall" warehouse for smaller items. Lastly, the self-service furniture warehouse stores the showroom products in flat-pack form for the customer to collect the ones previously noted. Sometimes, they are directed to collect products from an external warehouse on the same site or at a site nearby after purchase. Finally, customers pay for their products at a cash register. Not all furniture is stocked at the store level, such as particular sofa colours needing to be shipped from a warehouse to the customer's home or the store.

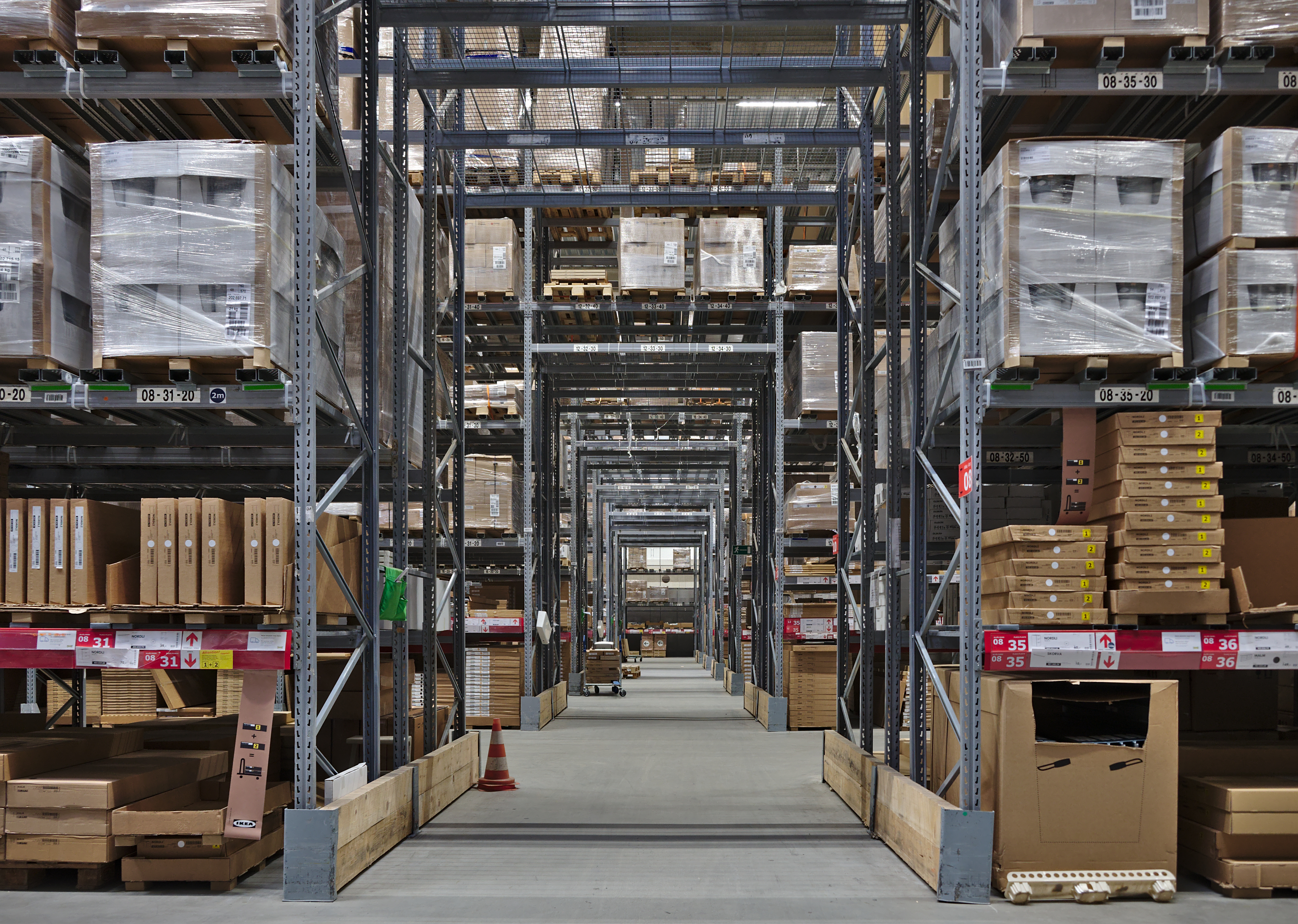
The self-service warehouse area

Most stores follow the layout of having the showroom upstairs with the marketplace and self-service warehouse downstairs. Some stores are single-level, while others have separate warehouses to allow more stock to be kept on-site. Single-level stores are found predominantly in areas where the cost of land would be less than the cost of building a two-level store. Some stores have dual-level warehouses with machine-controlled silos to allow large quantities of stock to be accessed throughout the selling day.

Most IKEA stores offer an "as-is" or "bargain corner" (recently rebranded as "re-shop and re-use") area at the end of the warehouse, just before the cash registers. Returned, damaged, and formerly showcased products are displayed here and sold with a significant discount.

In March 2022, IKEA swiftly exited the Russian market, due to Russia's invasion of Ukraine, leading to a surplus of items that were earmarked for the Russian market in IKEA's warehouses. To offload these items quickly, IKEA sold them in a number of non-Russian IKEA stores near the bargain corner at a discount.

=== Alternative smaller store formats ===
The majority of IKEA stores are located outside of city centres, primarily because of land cost and traffic access. Smaller store formats have been unsuccessfully tested in the past (the "midi" concept in the early 1990s, which was tested in Ottawa and Heerlen with 9,300 m^{2} (100,000 ft^{2}), or a "boutique" shop in Manhattan).

==== New formats for full-size stores ====
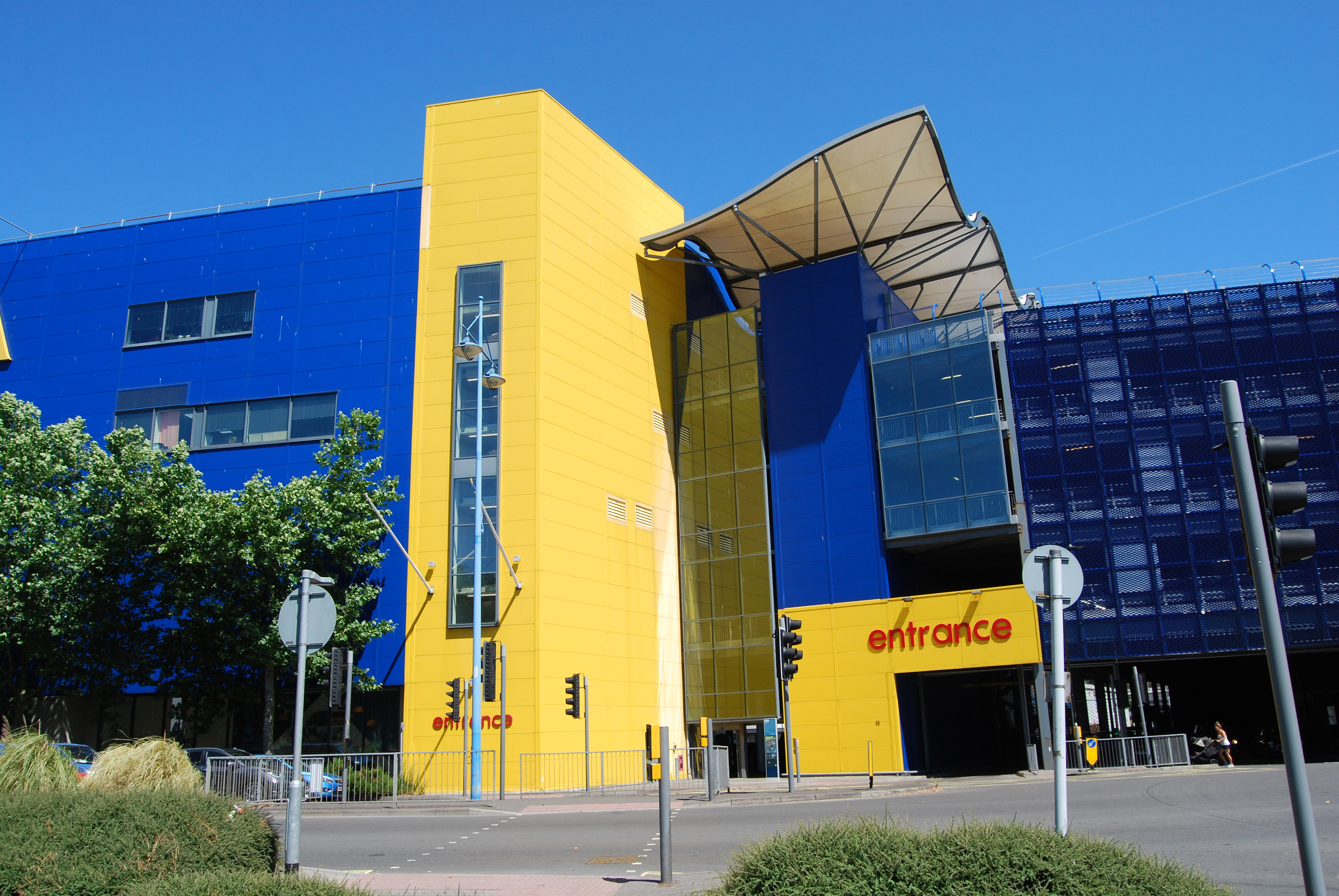
IKEA located in the city centre of Southampton, England

A new format for a full-size, city centre store was introduced with the opening of the Manchester store, situated in Ashton-under-Lyne in 2006. Another store, in Coventry, opened in December 2007. The store had seven floors and a flow different from that of other IKEA stores; however, it closed down in 2020 due to the site being deemed unsuitable for future business. IKEA's Southampton store that opened in February 2009 is also in the city centre and built in an urban style similar to that of the Coventry store. IKEA built these stores in response to UK government restrictions on large retail establishments outside city centres.

==== Adaptation to Japanese market ====
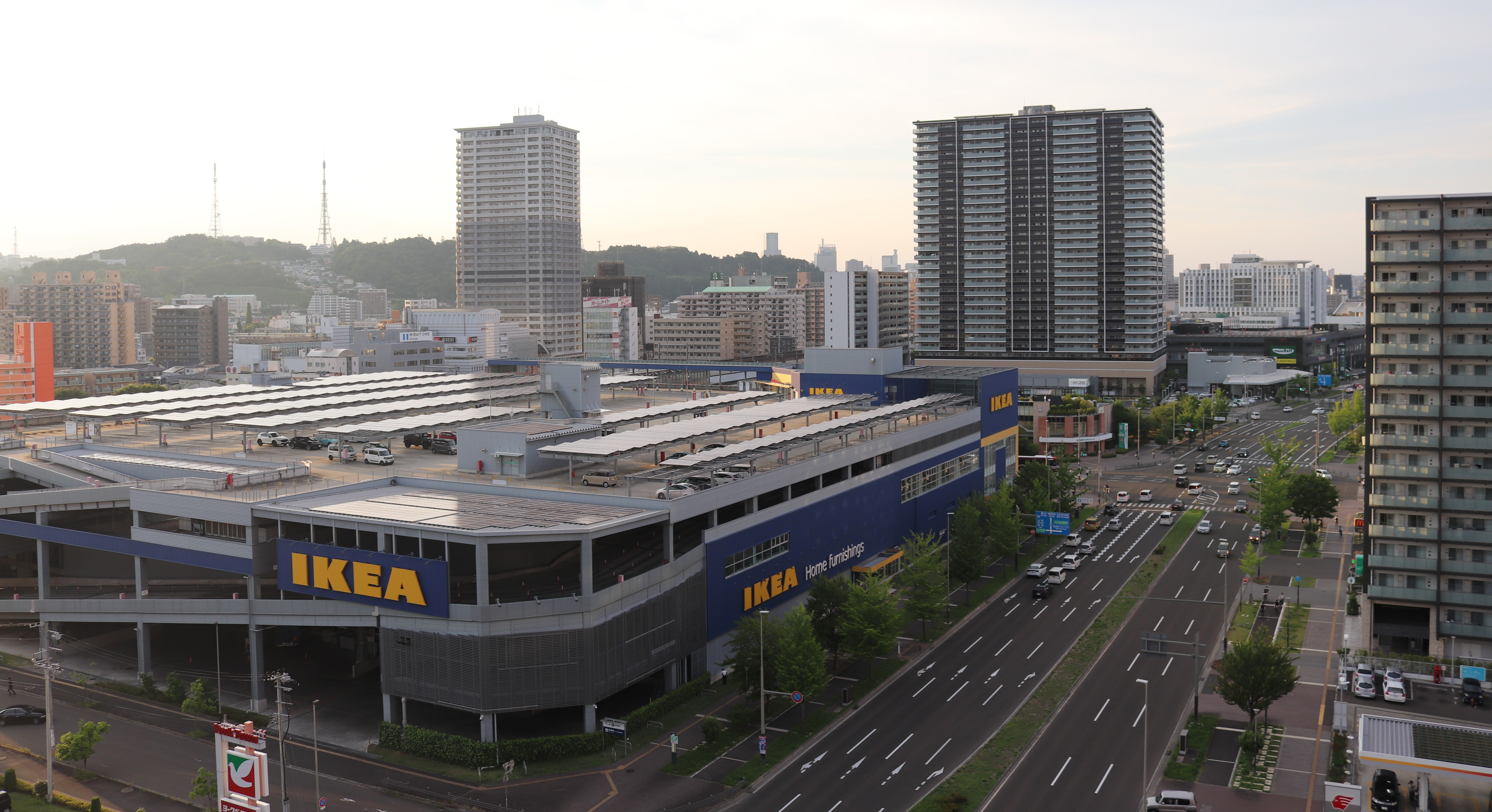
IKEA store in Sendai, Japan

Japan was another market where IKEA performed badly, exited the market completely, and then re-entered with an alternative store design and layout with which it finally found success. IKEA entered the Japanese market in 1974 through a franchise arrangement with a local partner, only to withdraw in failure in 1986. Japan was one of the first markets outside its original core European market. Despite Japan being the then-second-largest economy in the world, IKEA did not adapt its store layout strategy to the Japanese consumer. Japanese consumers did not have a culture of DIY furniture assembly, and many in the early days had no way to haul flat-packs home to their small apartments. Nor did the store layouts familiar to European customers initially make sense to Japanese consumers, so before re-entering the Japanese market in 2006, IKEA management did extensive local market research on more effective store layouts. One area of local adaptation was the room displays common to every IKEA store worldwide. Rather than just replicate a European room layout, the Japan management was careful to set up room displays more closely resembling Japanese apartment rooms, such as one for "a typical Japanese teenage boy who likes baseball and computer games".

==== Inner-city stores ====
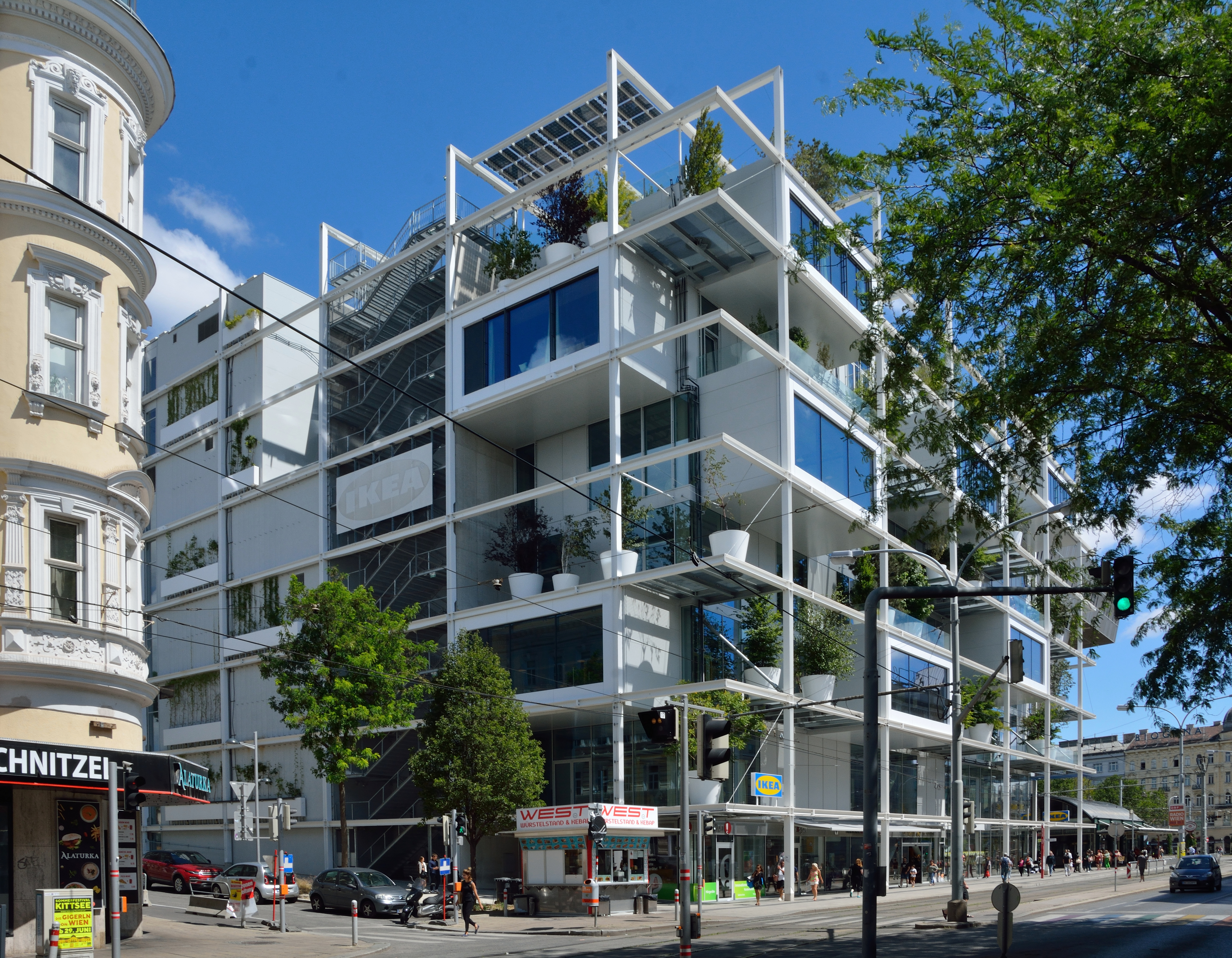
An inner-city IKEA store in Vienna, Austria, featuring a shelf-like grid facade integrated with live trees and greenery

IKEA adapted its store location and services to the 'inner-city' format for expansion in China, unlike other countries where IKEA stores, for economic and planning restrictions reasons, tend to be just outside city centres. In China, planning restrictions are less of an issue due to the lack of cars for much of its customer base. Accordingly, in store design alternatives, IKEA has had to offer store locations and formats closer to public transportation. The store design alternative thinking and strategy in China has been to locate stores to facilitate access for non-car owning customers. In some locations in China, IKEA stores can be found not in the usual suburban or near airport locations like other countries, but rather places such as downtown shopping centres with a 'mini-IKEA' store to attract shoppers. One store design alternative trend IKEA has implemented has been 'pop-up' stores along social media platforms in its advertising strategy, for the first time as a company, to reach new customer demographics while still reinforcing its global brand locally in China.

IKEA moved into Topshop's former flagship store on 214 Oxford Street, central London, with the store officially opening on 1 May 2025.

==== Small-sized stores ====
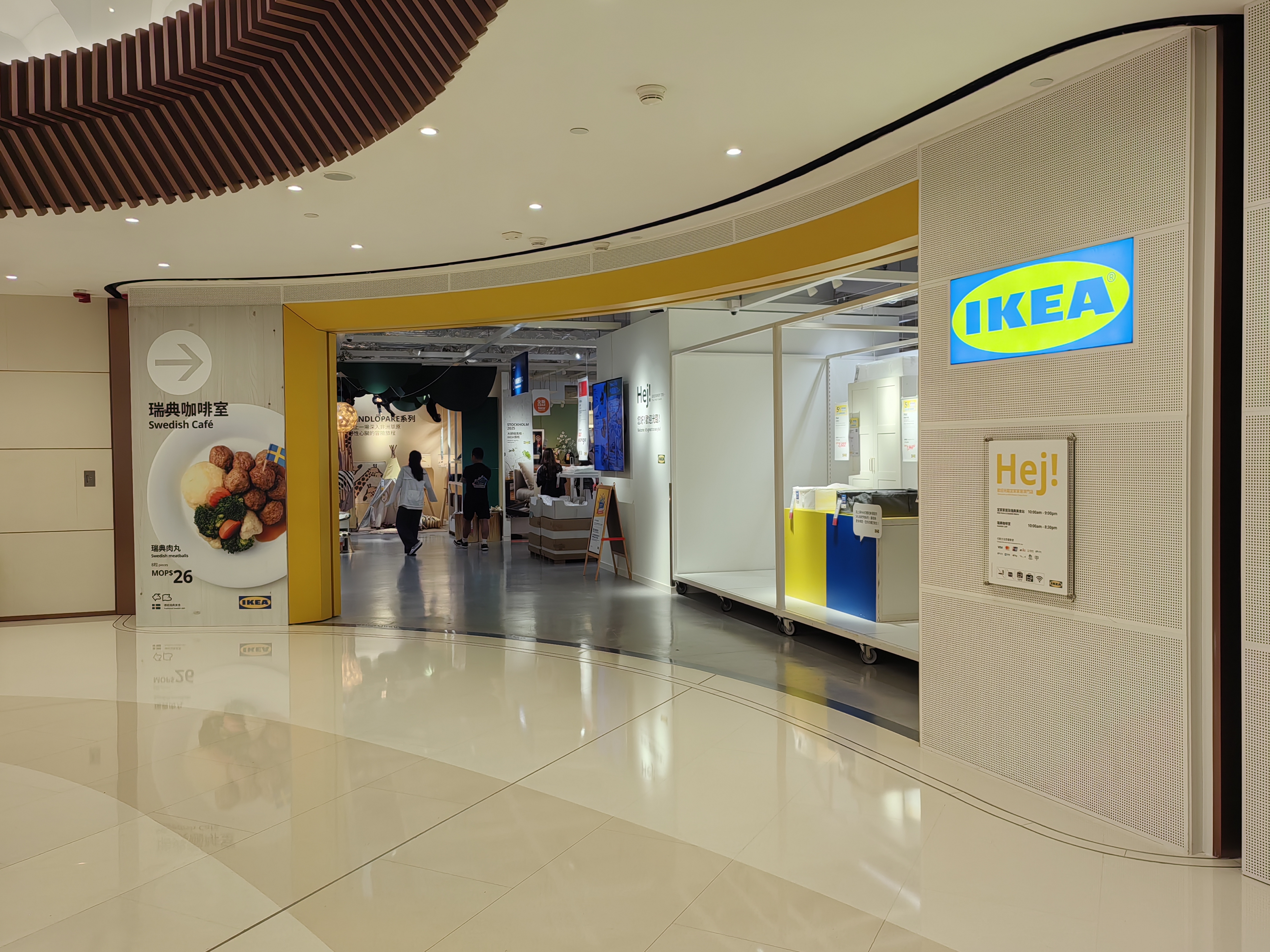
IKEA at NOVA Mall, Macau

In Hong Kong, where shop space is limited and costly, IKEA has opened four stores, all in multi-storey commercial buildings. They are smaller than other IKEA stores but large by Hong Kong standards. In addition to tailoring store sizes for specific countries, IKEA alters the sizes of products to accommodate cultural differences. In 2015, IKEA announced it would attempt smaller store designs at locations in Canada. IKEA claimed this new model would allow it to expand quickly into new markets rather than spending years opening a full-size store.

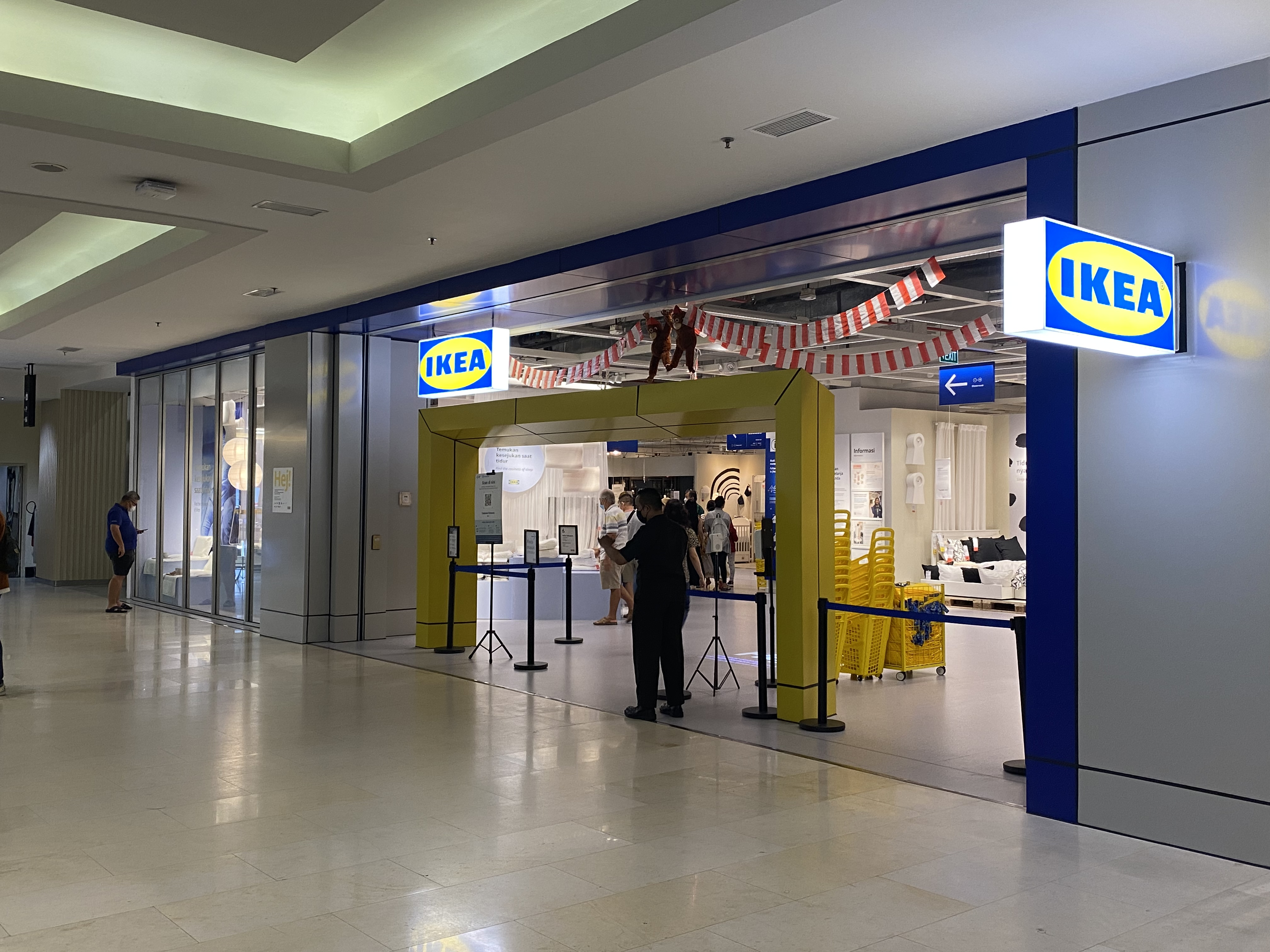
IKEA at Mall Taman Anggrek, Jakarta, Indonesia

In 2020, IKEA opened at Al Wahda Mall in Abu Dhabi, United Arab Emirates, which, at 2,137 m^{2} (23,002 sq ft), was one of the smallest IKEA stores to date. The company also opened at 360 Mall in Kuwait and in Harajuku, a trendy part of Tokyo, that same year. The size of the Kuwaiti 360 Mall store was slightly larger than Al Wahda's (despite bringing a similar concept), at 3,000 m^{2} (32,000 sq ft), built as an extension of the mall. As for IKEA Harajuku, the 2,500 m^{2} (26,910 sq ft), 7-storey store houses the chain's first and only konbini concept. In 2021, IKEA opened another one of its smallest stores, located at the JEM Mall in Jurong East, Singapore. Replacing the liquidated department store Robinsons, IKEA Jurong is only 6,500 m^{2} (70,000 sq ft), encompassing three levels; it was the first location in Southeast Asia that did not provide the "Market Hall" warehouse in its store. Also during 2021, IKEA opened a small-store-format location on Bali, Indonesia, replacing the liquidated former Giant hypermarket. IKEA Bali is dubbed "Customer Meeting Point", and is the smallest store to open thus far, at 1,200 m^{2} (13,000 sq ft).

In 2022, another smaller store was opened inside Livat Hammersmith, London, at 4,600 m^{2} (50,000 sq ft), followed by a 9,400 m^{2} (101,000 sq ft) store inside Mall Taman Anggrek, Jakarta, which was opened on 7 April 2022. A different "small store" concept was opened in 2026 in London, Ontario, Canada, at White Oaks Mall.

== Products and services ==
=== Furniture and homeware ===
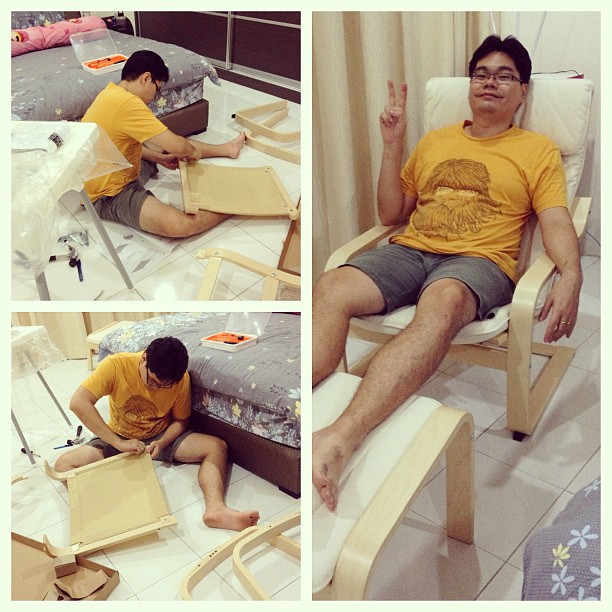
A man assembling an IKEA Poäng chair

Rather than being sold pre-assembled, much of IKEA's furniture is designed to be assembled by the customer. The company claims that this helps reduce costs and use of packaging by not shipping air; the volume of a bookcase, for example, is considerably less if it is shipped unassembled rather than assembled. This is also more practical for European customers using public transport, because flat packs can be more easily carried.

IKEA contends that it has been a pioneering force in sustainable approaches to mass consumer culture. Kamprad calls this "democratic design", meaning that the company applies an integrated approach to manufacturing and design (see also environmental design). In response to the explosion of human population and material expectations in the 20th and 21st centuries, the company implements economies of scale, capturing material streams and creating manufacturing processes that hold costs and resource use down, such as the extensive use of medium-density fibreboard ("MDF"), also called "particle board".

Notable items of IKEA furniture include the Poäng armchair, the Billy bookcase, and the Klippan sofa, all of which have sold by the tens of millions since the late 1970s and early 1980s.

The IKEA and LEGO brands teamed up to create a range of simple storage solutions for children and adults.

==== The "IKEA effect" ====
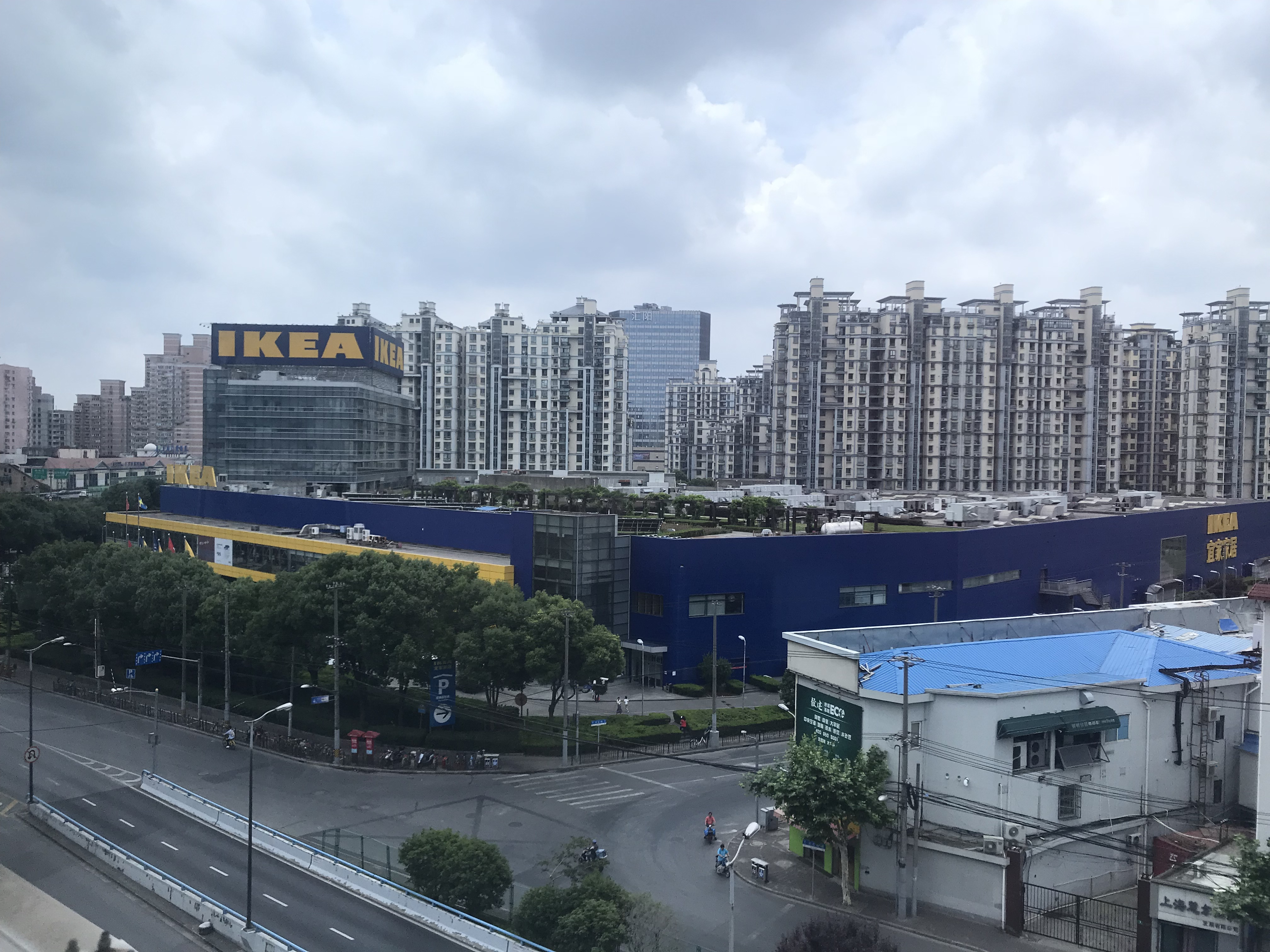
IKEA store in Shanghai, China

The IKEA effect is a phenomenon where customers value an item more if they contributed to its creation, compared to an otherwise identical pre-assembled item. Although named after IKEA's flat-packed furniture, it also applies to other assembly-required items such as LEGO. The effect is only seen after construction, with consumers believing they would be willing to pay more for pre-assembled items beforehand. Possible explanations for the increase in value include the enjoyment of the assembly process and increased feelings of competency from a successful construction. If the item is subsequently disassembled, or the consumer fails to assemble it, the increased value is lost.

IKEA products are notably easy to hack and DIY, which also increases sales among customers. The term IKEA Hackers comes from a group who hack and create new things using IKEA products. The DIY hackers use IKEA products to make new unique items. The IKEA Hackers have created a community with the DIY style projects. There are also companies that create products to facilitate this.

==== Furniture and product naming ====
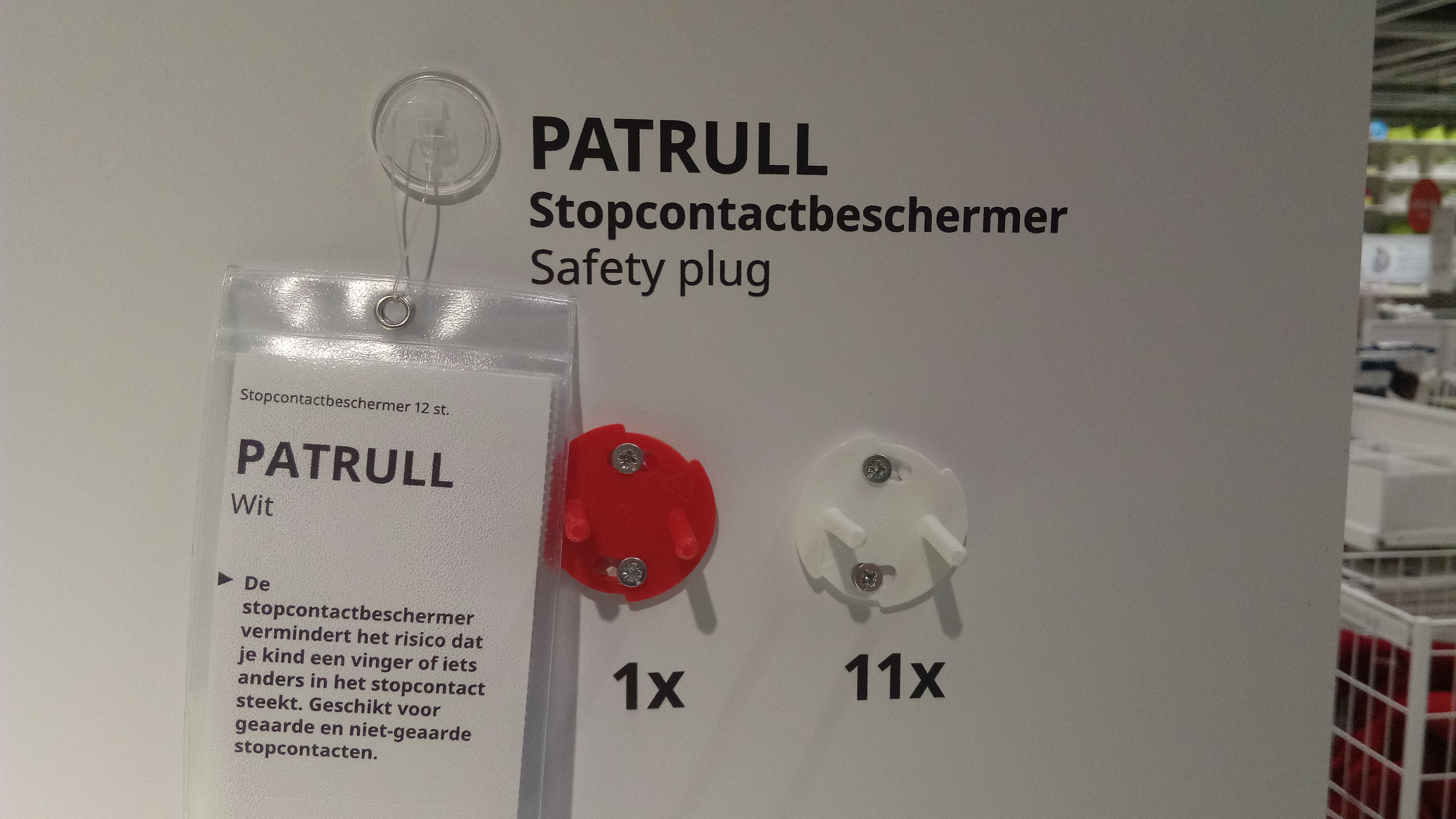
An IKEA socket cover featuring the name PATRULL (Swedish for "patrol")

IKEA products are identified by one-word (occasionally, two-word) names, predominantly in the Swedish language (or otherwise Scandinavian in origin). With few exceptions, most product names are based on a special naming system developed by the company. The company founder Kamprad was dyslexic, and found that naming the furniture with proper names and words, rather than a long product code, made the products easier to identify and remember. Products are usually named after locations in Scandinavian countries, using names of places in Sweden for sofas and coffee tables, Denmark for textiles, and Norway for beds. Lamps get their names from seas and lakes, while outdoor furniture is named after islands.

A number of IKEA's products bearing Swedish names have (or have had) pronunciations that are humorous to some and offensive to others (but no less "lost-in-translation"), by not only English-speakers but speakers of many different languages. At times, this product identification has resulted in certain names being changed or withdrawn completely from certain markets. More often than not, this confusion is simply a result of the Swedish language not being executed correctly, let alone understood, by the reader; nonetheless, this has resulted in potentially "naughty"—or even gravely offensive—connotations, depending on the area in question. Notable examples (for English-speakers) include a since-discontinued (2013) computer desk called jerker (referring to "the jerks" or "jerks"), a foliar plant spray called fukta ("moisten"), a workbench called fartfull ("speedy", "quick"), and a table called lyckhem (pronounced roughly as "look-em"), meaning "bliss" or a "happy home".

Due to several products being named after real places, some locales have ended-up sharing names with objects considered generally unpleasant, such as a toilet brush being named after the lake of Bolmen, or a rubbish bin named after the Norwegian village of Tofte. In November 2021, VisitSweden.com launched a jocular campaign named "Discover the Originals", which invited tourists to visit the physical locations that have received such unfortunate associations with IKEA products.

=== Design services ===
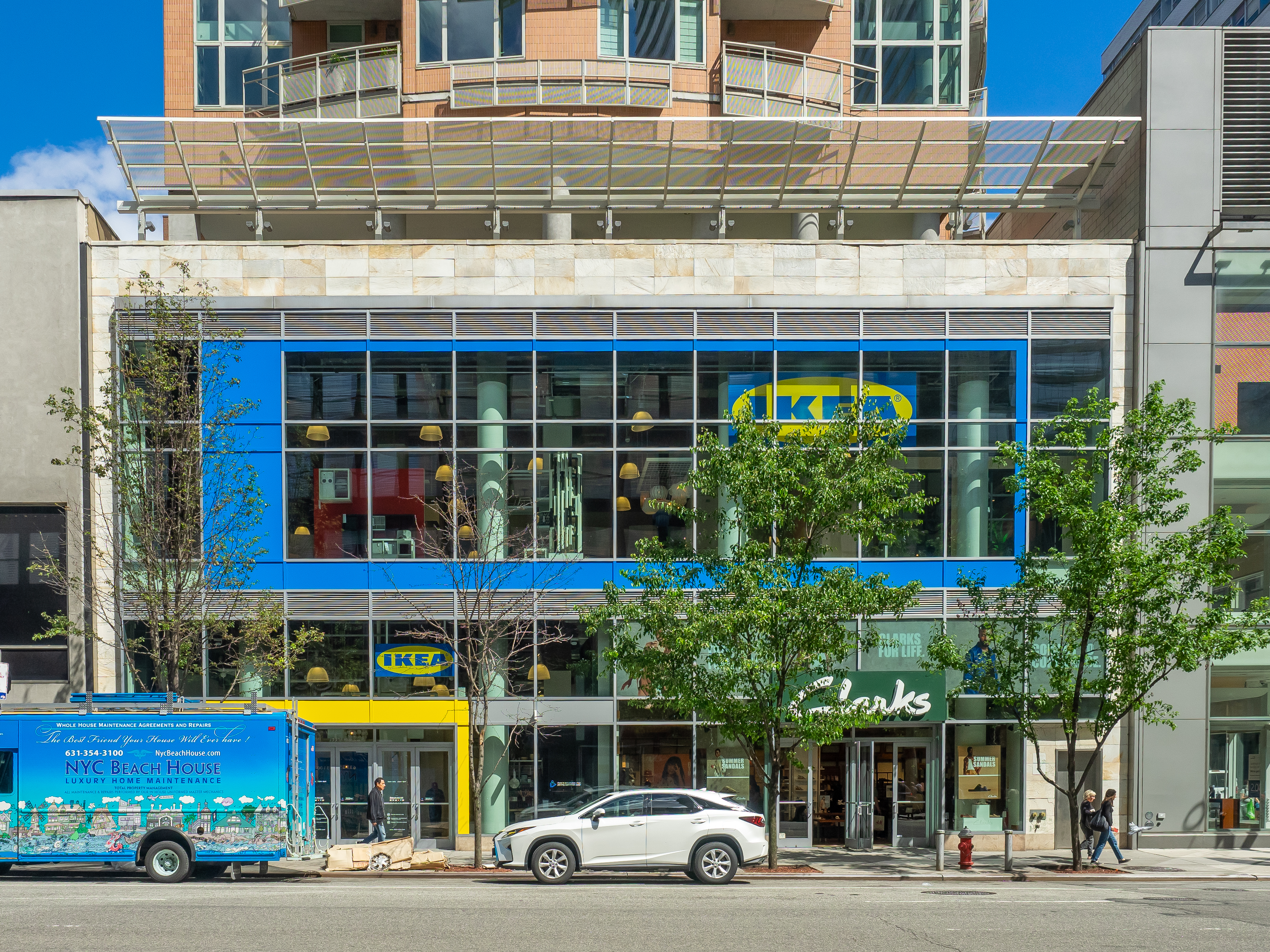
The first US Planning Studio located in Manhattan, United States, in 2019, which closed in January 2022

In March 2021, IKEA launched IKEA Studio in partnership with Apple Inc., an app enabling customers to design full-scale rooms with IKEA furniture using augmented reality on an iPhone.

In June 2022, IKEA launched IKEA Kreativ, a digital interior-design tool integrated into the IKEA app and IKEA.com that allows users to visualize furniture in their own living spaces. The underlying computer-vision and spatial-mapping technology was developed by Geomagical Labs, a retail-technology company acquired by Ingka Group, IKEA’s largest retailer, in April 2020. As of 2024, IKEA Kreativ is available in more than 29 IKEA markets worldwide.

=== Smart home ===
In 2016, IKEA started a move into the smart home business. The IKEA TRÅDFRI smart lighting kit was one of the first ranges signalling this change. IKEA has also started a partnership with Philips Hue. The wireless charging furniture, integrating wireless Qi charging into everyday furniture, is another strategy for the smart home business.

A collaboration to build Sonos smart speaker technology into furniture sold by IKEA was announced in December 2017. The first products resulting from the collaboration launched in August 2019.

Under the product name SYMFONISK, IKEA and SONOS have made two distinct wireless speakers that integrate with existing SONOS households or can be used to start with the SONOS ecosystem, one that's also a lamp and another that's a more traditional-looking bookshelf speaker. Both products, as well as accessories for the purpose of mounting the bookshelf speakers, have gone on sale worldwide on 1 August.

From the start, IKEA SYMFONISK could only be controlled from the SONOS app, but IKEA added support for the speakers in its own Home Smart app to be paired with scenes that control both the lights, air purifiers, smart plugs and smart blinds together with the speakers.

The Symfonisk series was later replaced in 2026 by the bluetooth speakers Vappeby, Solskydd, Nattbad, Badkruka and Kallsup. These newer speakers lack Airplay 2 support and WiFi. The sound quality of the newer speakers has also been criticised for having lower audio quality than the older Symfonisk series and lack of other streaming options apart from bluetooth.

In November 2025, IKEA announced a range of smart devices, built to work with Matter, to be released in stages from December 2025 until mid 2026. These are to replace the old brand names and products. Below is a table with the comparable products as well as new products that do not have an older counterpart

Old product	→	New product	Function	Release	Notes
Trådfri Gateway	→	Dirigera	Thread border router and Zigbee coordinator	2022	
Tretakt / Inspelning	→	Grillplats	Smart plug	2025	
Trådfri	→	Kajplats	Light bulb	2025	
Styrbar	→	Bilresa	Remote	2025	
Rodret	→	Bilresa	Remote	2025	
Parasoll	→	Myggbett	Contact sensor	2025	
Vallhorn	→	Myggspray	Motion sensor	2025	
Badring	→	Klippbok	Water leak sensor	2025	
Vindstyrka	→	Alpstuga	Air quality sensor	2025	
Varmblixt	→	Varmblixt	LED table/wall lamp	2026	Earlier version was non-smart.
No counterpart		Timmerflotte	Temperature and humidity sensor	2025	
No counterpart		Tofsmygga	Outdoor Smart plug	2026	Only available in select markets.
Trådfri Driver	→	Dubbelkisel	Driver for wireless control	2026	
No counterpart		Liljebagge	Smart radiator thermostat	2026	As of September 2026 only available in Sweden

Ikea SYMFONISK was discontinued in January 2026 by mutual agreement that no new products would be co-developed between IKEA and SONOS

=== Houses and flats ===
IKEA has also expanded its product base to include flat-pack houses and apartments, in an effort to cut the prices involved in a first-time buyer's home. The IKEA product, named BoKlok, was launched in Sweden in 1996 in a joint venture with Skanska. Now working in the Nordic countries and in the UK, sites confirmed in England include London, Ashton-under-Lyne, Leeds, Gateshead, Warrington, Bristol, and Liverpool.

==== Solar PV systems ====
At the end of September 2013, the company announced that solar panel packages, so-called "residential kits", for houses would be sold at 17 UK stores by mid-2014. The decision followed a successful pilot project at the Lakeside IKEA store, whereby one photovoltaic system was sold almost every day. The solar CIGS panels are manufactured by Solibro, a German-based subsidiary of the Chinese company Hanergy. By the end of 2014, IKEA began to sell Solibro's solar residential kits in the Netherlands and in Switzerland. In November 2015, IKEA ended its contract with Hanergy and in April 2016 started working with Solarcentury to sell solar panels in the United Kingdom. The deal would allow customers to be able to order panels online and at three stores before being expanded to all United Kingdom stores by the end of summer.

==== Furniture rental ====
In April 2019, the company announced that it would begin test marketing a new concept, renting furniture to customers. One of the motivating factors was that inexpensive IKEA products were viewed as "disposable" and often ended up being scrapped after a few years of use. This was at a time when, especially younger buyers, said it wanted to minimize its impact on the environment. The company understood this view. In an interview, Jesper Brodin, the chief executive of Ingka Group (the largest franchisee of IKEA stores), commented that "climate change and unsustainable consumption are among the biggest challenges we face in society". The other strategic objectives of the plan were to be more affordable and more convenient. The company said it would test the rental concept in all 30 markets by 2020, expecting it to increase the number of times a piece of furniture would be used before recycling.

=== Restaurant and food markets ===
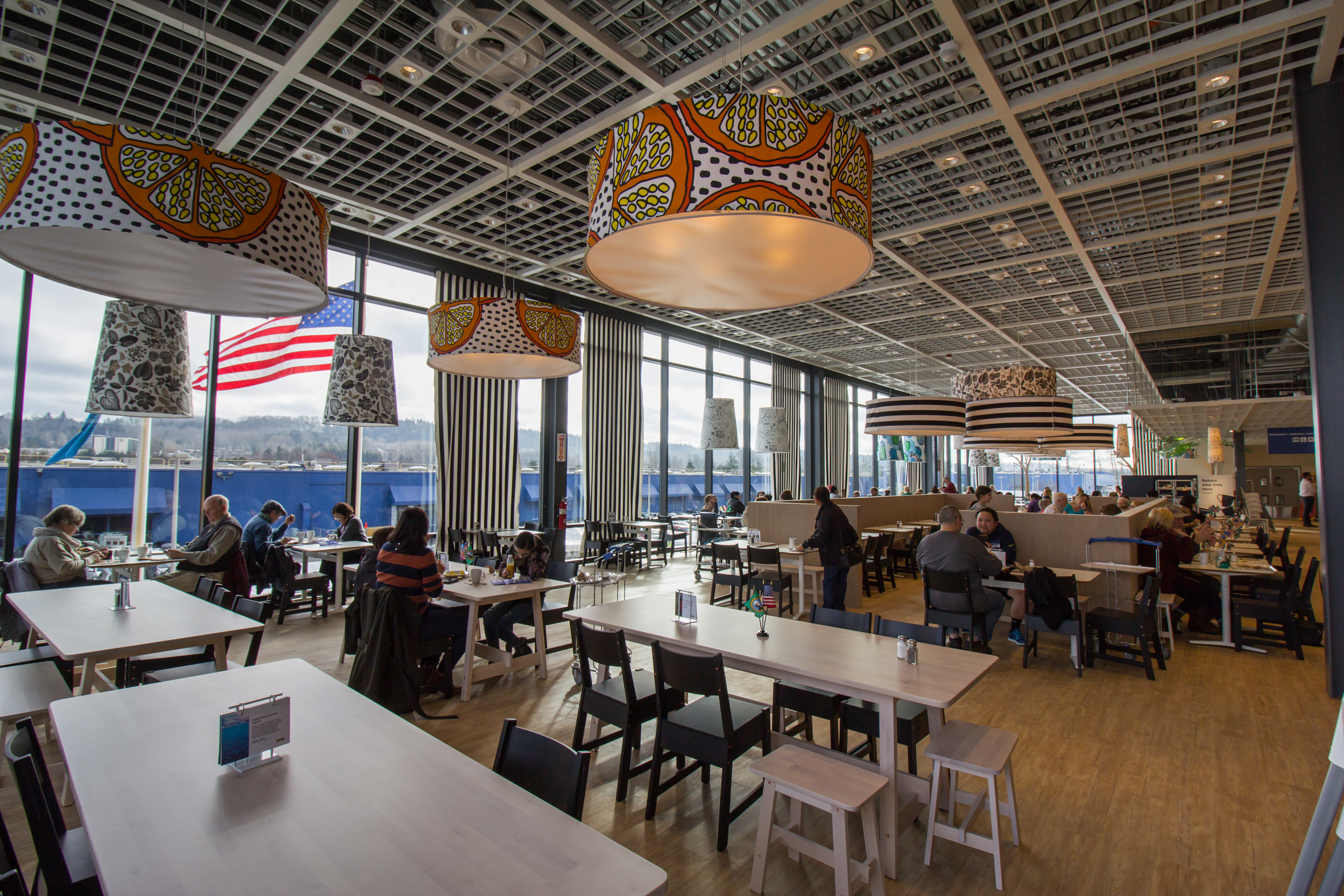
IKEA restaurant in Renton, Washington, United States

The first IKEA store opened in 1958 with a small cafe that transitioned into a full-blown restaurant in 1960 that, until 2011, sold branded Swedish prepared specialist foods, such as meatballs, packages of gravy, lingonberry jam, various biscuits and crackers, and salmon and fish roe spread. The new label has a variety of items, including chocolates, meatballs, jams, pancakes, salmon, and various drinks.

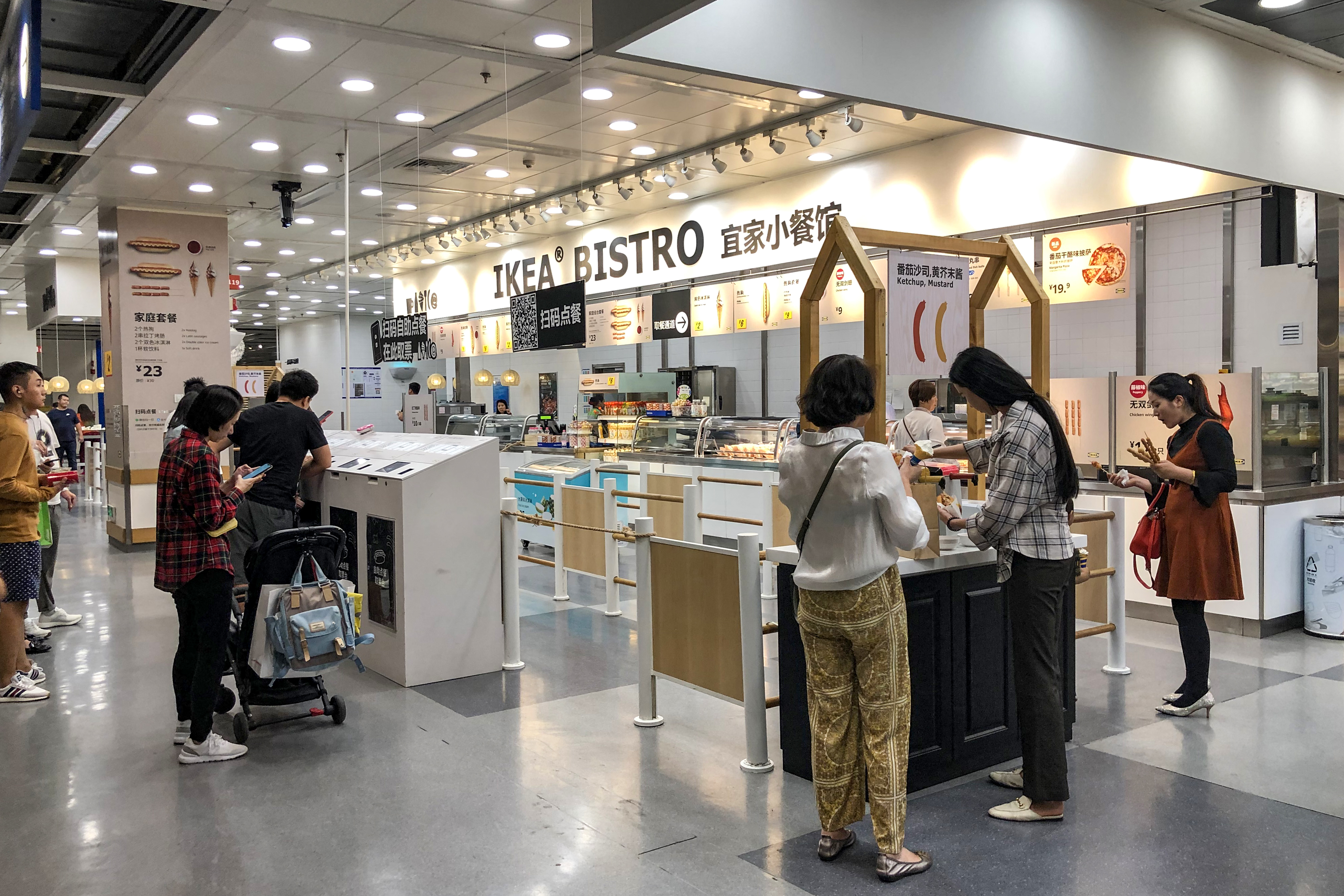
IKEA Bistro in Beijing, China

Although the cafes primarily serve Swedish food, the menu varies based on the culture, food, and location of each store. With restaurants in 38 countries, the menu often incorporates local dishes, including shawarma in Saudi Arabia and the UAE, poutine in Canada, macarons in France, and gelato in Italy. In Indonesia, the Swedish meatballs recipe is changed to accommodate the country's halal requirements. Stores in Israel sell kosher food under rabbinical supervision. The kosher restaurants are separated into dairy and meat areas.

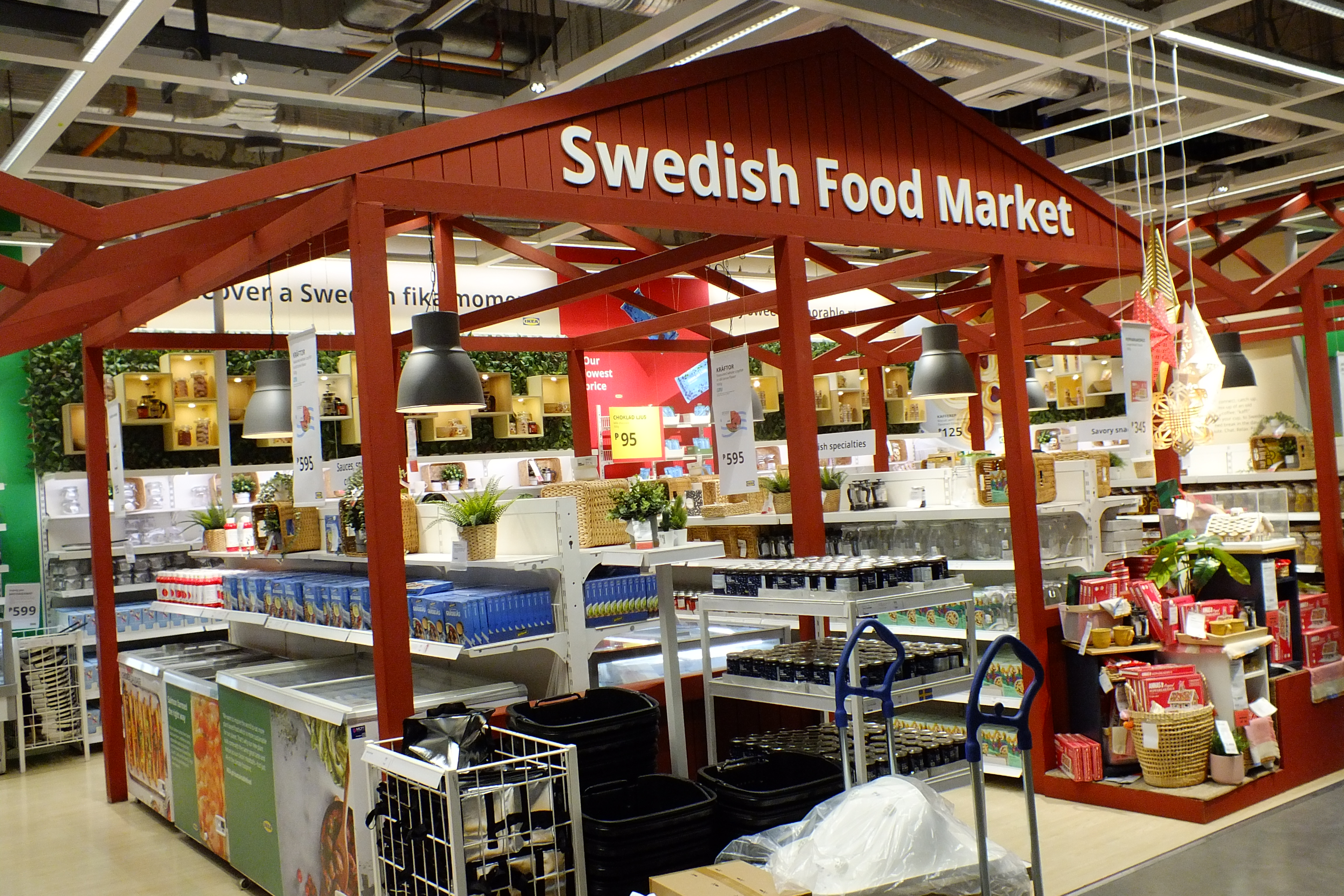
Swedish Food Market in Pasay, Philippines

In many locations, the IKEA restaurants open daily before the rest of the store and serve breakfast. All food products are based on Swedish recipes and traditions. Food accounted for 5% of IKEA's sales by 2019.

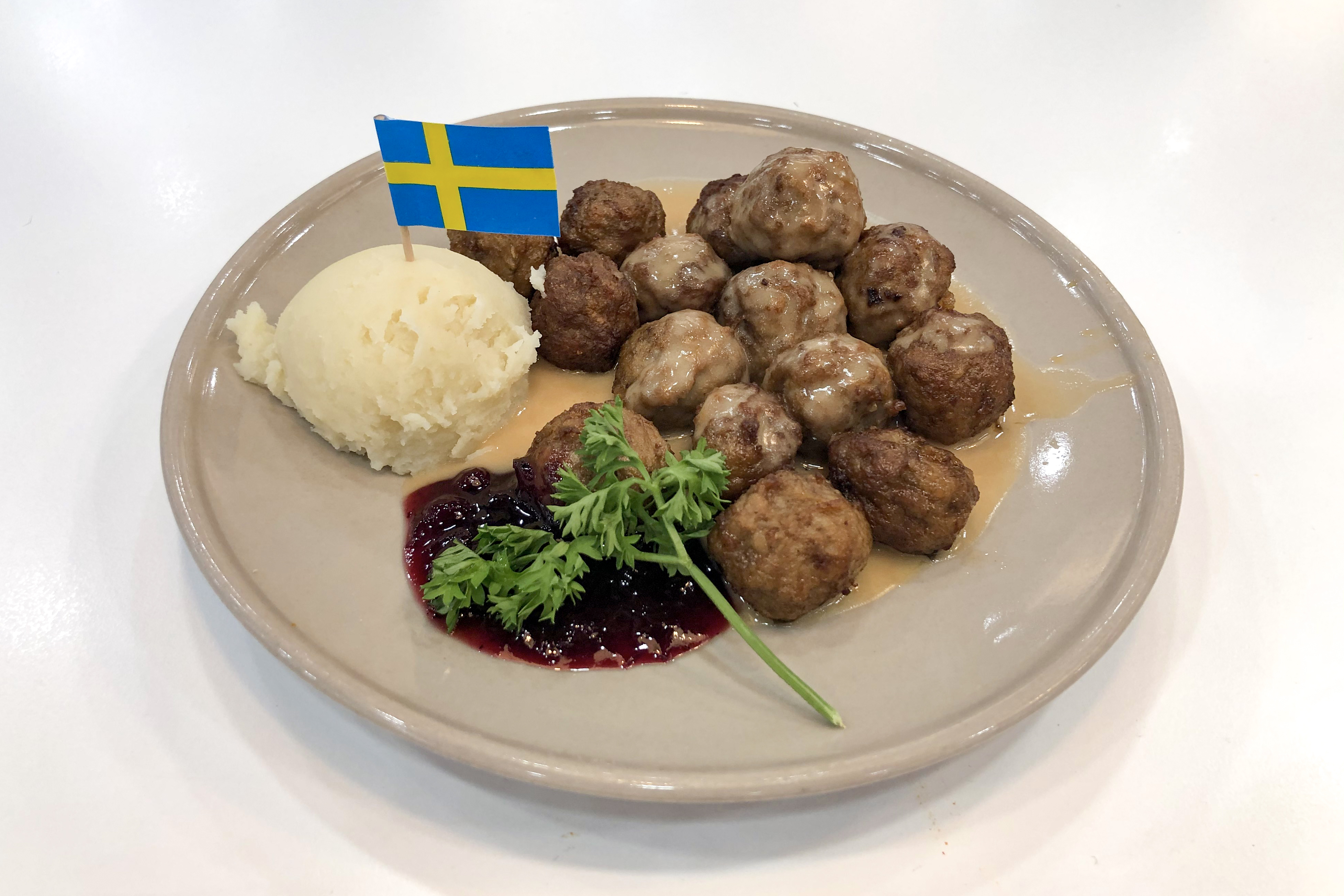
Swedish meatballs

IKEA sells plant-based meatballs made from potatoes, apples, pea protein, and oats in all of its stores. According to United States journalist Avery Yale Kamila, IKEA began testing its plant-based meatballs in 2014, then launched the plant-based meatballs in 2015 and began testing vegan hot dogs in 2018. In 2019, journalist James Hansen reported in Eater London that IKEA would only sell vegetarian food at Christmas time.

=== Småland ===
Every store has a children's play area, named Småland (Swedish for small lands; it is also the Swedish province of Småland where founder Kamprad was born). Parents drop off their children at a gate to the playground and pick them up after they arrive at another entrance. In some stores, parents are given free pagers by the on-site staff, which the staff can use to summon parents whose children need them earlier than expected; in others, staff summon parents through announcements over the in-store public address system or by calling them on their mobile phones. The largest Småland play area is located at the IKEA store in Navi Mumbai, India.

=== IKEA Preowned ===
In August 2024, Ikea announced it would be trialing an online marketplace where customers can connect to buy and sell pre-owned items made by Ikea.

The marketplace, called "IKEA Preowned", would run from August until December 2024 and be centred on the cities of Oslo, Norway and Madrid, Spain.

=== Other ventures ===
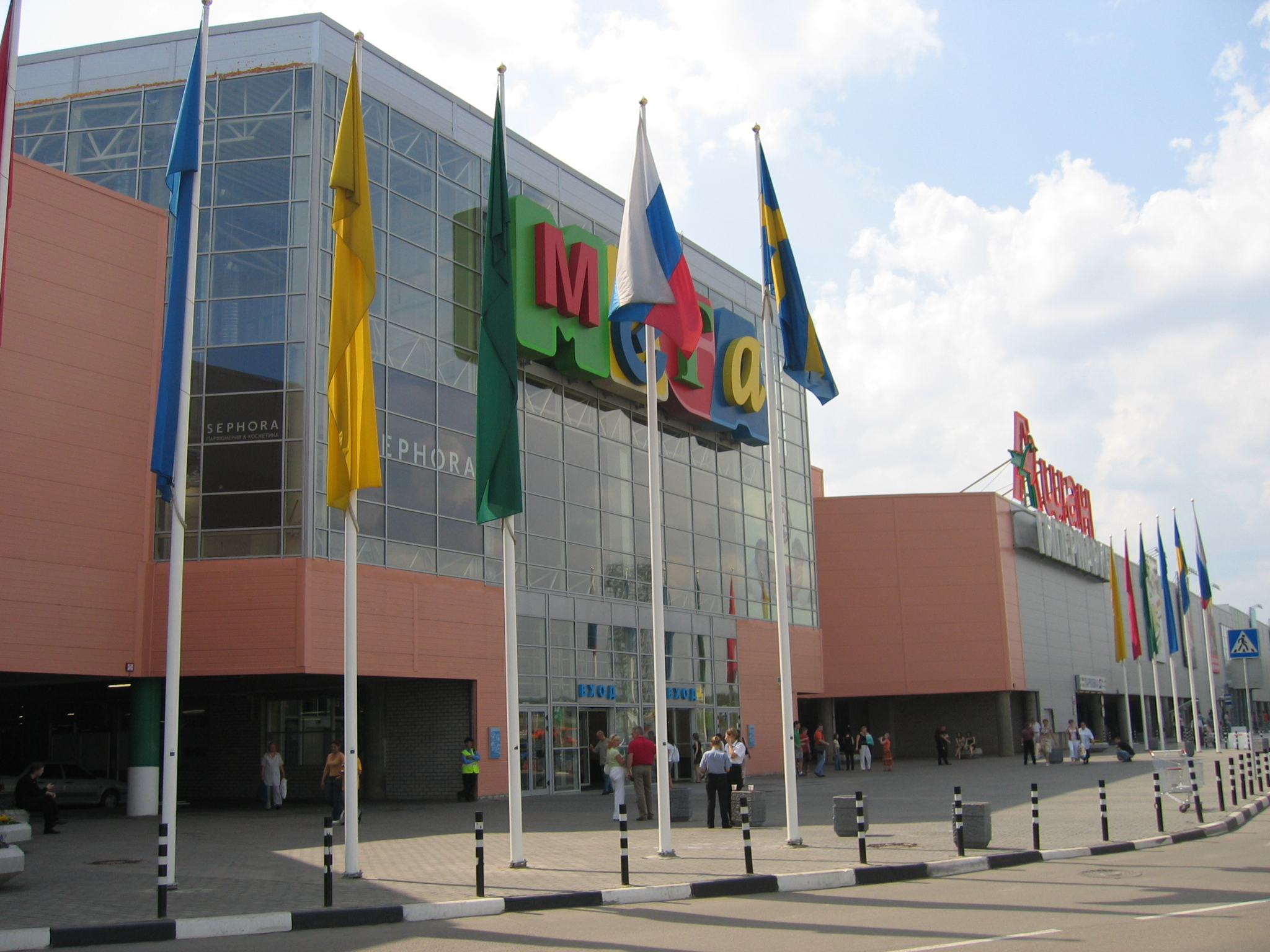
A MEGA Family Shopping Centre in Russia

Until 28 September 2023, IKEA owned & operated the MEGA Family Shopping Centre chain in Russia. Its operations have since been sold to Gazprombank.

On 8 August 2008, IKEA UK launched a virtual mobile phone network called IKEA Family Mobile, which ran on T-Mobile. At launch it was the cheapest pay-as-you-go network in the UK. In June 2015 the network announced that its services would cease to operate from 31 August 2015.

In 2012, IKEA established joint venture with TCL to provide Uppleva integrated HDTV and entertainment system products. It had been completely discontinued as of 2017.

In mid-August 2012, the company announced that it would establish a chain of 100 economy hotels in Europe, but, unlike its few existing hotels in Scandinavia, they would not carry the IKEA name, nor would they use IKEA furniture and furnishings – they would be operated by an unnamed international group of hoteliers. As of 30 April 2018, however, the company owned only a single hotel, the IKEA Hotell in Älmhult, Sweden.

It was previously planned to open another one, in New Haven, Connecticut, United States, after converting the historic Pirelli Building. The company received approval for the concept from the city's planning commission in mid-November 2018; the building was to include 165 rooms, and the property would offer 129 dedicated parking spaces. Research in April 2019 provided no indication that the hotel had been completed as of that time. The building was then sold to Connecticut architect and developer Becker + Becker for $1.2 million. Opening in 2022 under Hotel Marcel, it is managed by Charlestowne Hotels and became part of Hilton's Tapestry Collection.

From 2016 to 2018, IKEA sold a commuter belt-driven bicycle, the Sladda.

In September 2017, IKEA announced it would be acquiring the UD company TaskRabbit. The deal, completed later that year, has TaskRabbit operating as an independent company.

In March 2020, IKEA announced that it had partnered with Pizza Hut Hong Kong on a joint venture. IKEA launched a new side table called SÄVA. The table, designed to resemble a pizza saver, would be boxed in packaging resembling a pizza box, and the building instructions included a suggestion to order a Swedish meatball pizza from Pizza Hut, which would contain the same meatballs served in IKEA restaurants.

In April 2020, IKEA acquired AI imaging startup Geomagical Labs.

In July 2020, IKEA opened a concept store in the Harajuku district of Tokyo, Japan, where it launched its first ever apparel line.

Ingka Centres, IKEA's malls division, announced in December 2021 that it would open two malls, anchored by IKEA stores, in Gurugram and Noida in India at a cost of around ₹9,000 crore (US$960 million). Both malls are expected to open by 2025.

In 2016, IKEA Canada partnered with the Setsuné Indigenous Fashion Incubator, co-founded by Sage Paul, to design and produce the collection ÅTERSTÄLLA, which means to restore, heal, or redecorate, and it was made entirely from salvaged Ikea textiles, reflecting the traditional Indigenous value to "use everything".

=== Product recalls ===
Product recalls should not uniformly be considered criticism of IKEA, though some do come under this rubric. Listed here are more 'generic' recalls that have not been elevated to the level of 'criticisms'.

- In late 2025, a recall of over 43,000 garlic press utensils was made due to the potential for metal to detach in small pieces and be included in the garlic used for cooking, potentially leading to injury while ingesting dishes including such processed garlic.

== Corporate structure ==
IKEA ownership chart
Flowchart showing the structure and ownership of IKEA companies. Parent companies are at the top of the chart.
Provides services to | Is the parent of | Provides funding to

IKEA is owned and operated by a series of not-for-profit and for-profit corporations. The corporate structure is divided into two main parts: operations and franchising.

INGKA Holding B.V., based in the Netherlands, owns the Ingka Group, which takes care of the centres, retails, customer fulfillment, and all the other services related to IKEA products. The IKEA brand is owned and managed by Inter IKEA Systems B.V., based in the Netherlands, owned by Inter IKEA Holding B.V. Inter IKEA Holding is also in charge of design, manufacturing and supply of IKEA products.

Inter IKEA Systems is owned by Inter IKEA Holding BV, a company registered in the Netherlands, formerly registered in Luxembourg (under the name Inter IKEA Holding SA). Inter IKEA Holding, in turn, is owned by the Interogo Foundation, based in Liechtenstein. In 2016, the INGKA Holding sold its design, manufacturing and logistics subsidiaries to Inter IKEA Holding.

In June 2013, Ingvar Kamprad resigned from the board of Inter IKEA Holding SA, and his youngest son, Mathias Kamprad, replaced Per Ludvigsson as the chairman of the holding company. Following his decision to step down, the 87-year-old founder explained, "I see this as a good time for me to leave the board of Inter IKEA Group. By that we are also taking another step in the generation shift that has been ongoing for some years." After the 2016 company restructure, Inter IKEA Holding SA no longer exists, having reincorporated in the Netherlands. Mathias Kamprad became a board member of the Inter IKEA Group and the Interogo Foundation. Mathias and his two older brothers, who also have leadership roles at IKEA, work on the corporation's overall vision and long-term strategy.

=== Control by Kamprad ===
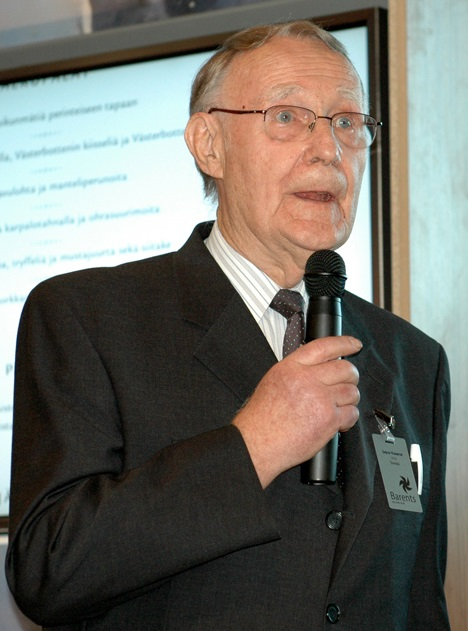
The late Ingvar Kamprad, founder of IKEA

Along with helping IKEA make a non-taxable profit, IKEA's complicated corporate structure allowed Kamprad to maintain tight control over the operations of INGKA Holding, and thus the operation of most IKEA stores. The INGKA Foundation's five-person executive committee was chaired by Kamprad. It appoints a board of INGKA Holding, approves any changes to INGKA Holding's bylaws, and has the right to preempt new share issues. If a member of the executive committee quits or dies, the other four members appoint their replacement.

In Kamprad's absence, the foundation's bylaws include specific provisions requiring it to continue operating the INGKA Holding group and specifying that shares can be sold only to another foundation with the same objectives as the INGKA Foundation.

=== Financial information ===
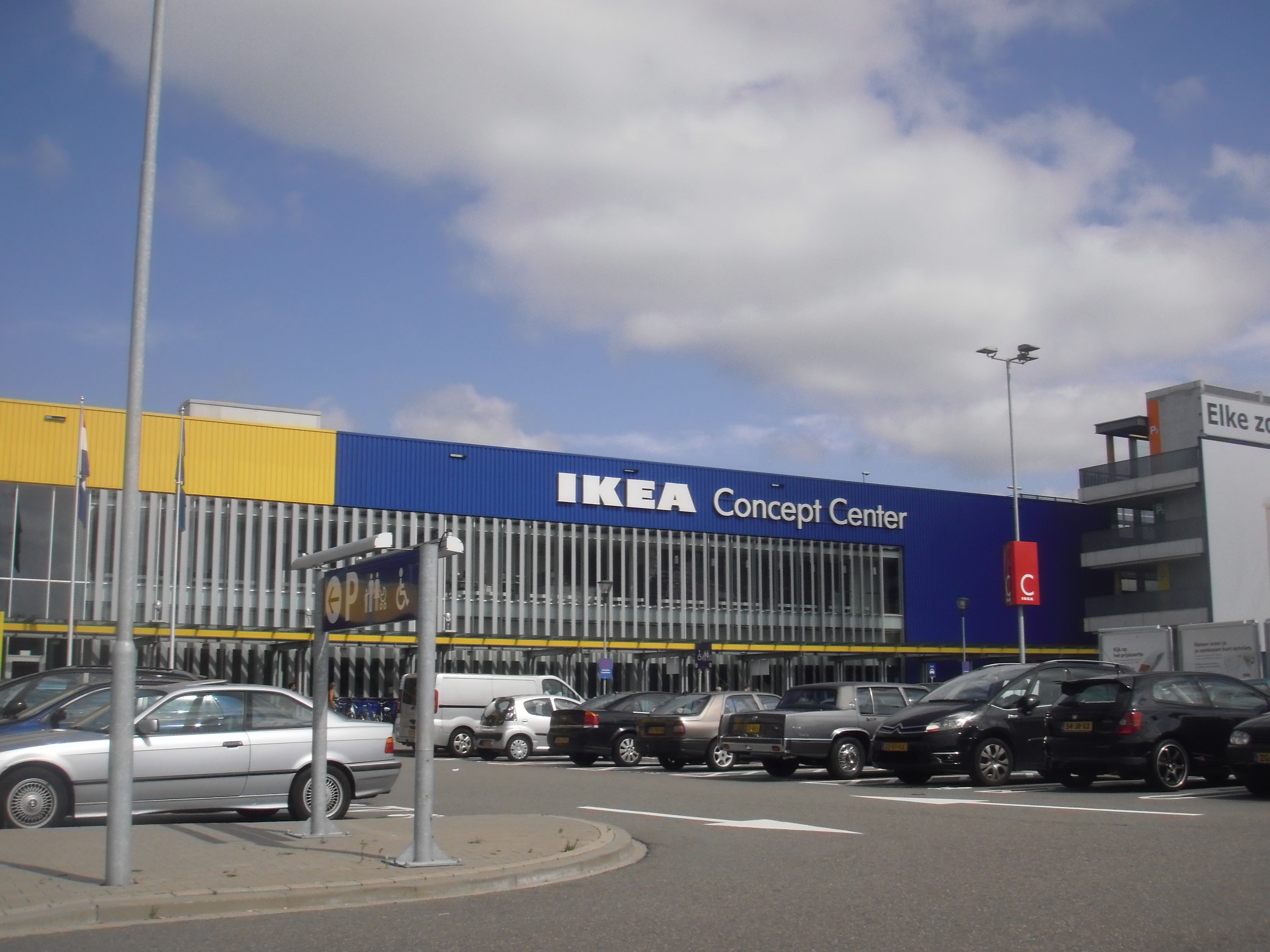
IKEA Concept Centre in Delft – the head office of Inter IKEA Systems B.V., which owns the IKEA trademark and concept

The net profit of IKEA Group (which does not include Inter IKEA systems) in fiscal year 2009 (after paying franchise fees to Inter IKEA systems) was €2.538 billion on sales of €21.846 billion. Because INGKA Holding is owned by the non-profit INGKA Foundation, none of this profit is taxed. The foundation's nonprofit status also means that the Kamprad family cannot reap these profits directly, but the Kamprads do collect a portion of IKEA sales profits through the franchising relationship between INGKA Holding and Inter IKEA Systems.

As a franchisee, the Ingka Group pays 3% of royalties to Inter IKEA Systems. Inter IKEA Systems collected €631 million of franchise fees in 2004 but reported pre-tax profits of only €225 million in 2004. One of the major pre-tax expenses that Inter IKEA systems reported was €590 million of "other operating charges". IKEA has refused to explain these charges, but Inter IKEA Systems appears to make large payments to I.I. Holding, another Luxembourg-registered group that, according to The Economist, "is almost certain to be controlled by the Kamprad family". I.I. Holding made a profit of €328 million in 2004.

In 2004, the Inter IKEA group of companies and I.I. Holding reported combined profits of €553m and paid €19m in taxes, or approximately 3.5 percent.

IKEA has avoided millions of euros in taxes performing some intricate mechanisms and it was noted by the EU back in 2017. The main countries where it operated its business using tax loopholes were the Netherlands, Luxembourg, and Belgium.

Public Eye, a non-profit organisation in Switzerland that promotes corporate responsibility, has formally criticised IKEA for its tax avoidance strategies. In 2007, the organisation nominated IKEA for one of its Public Eye "awards", which highlight corporate irresponsibility.

In February 2016, the Greens / EFA group in the European Parliament issued a report entitled IKEA: Flat Pack Tax Avoidance on the tax planning strategies of IKEA and its possible use to avoid tax in several European countries. The report was sent to Pierre Moscovici, the European Commissioner for Economic and Financial Affairs, Taxation and Customs, and Margrethe Vestager, the European Commissioner for Competition, expressing the hope that it would be of use to them in their respective roles "to advance the fight for tax justice in Europe".

== Manufacturing, logistics, and labour ==
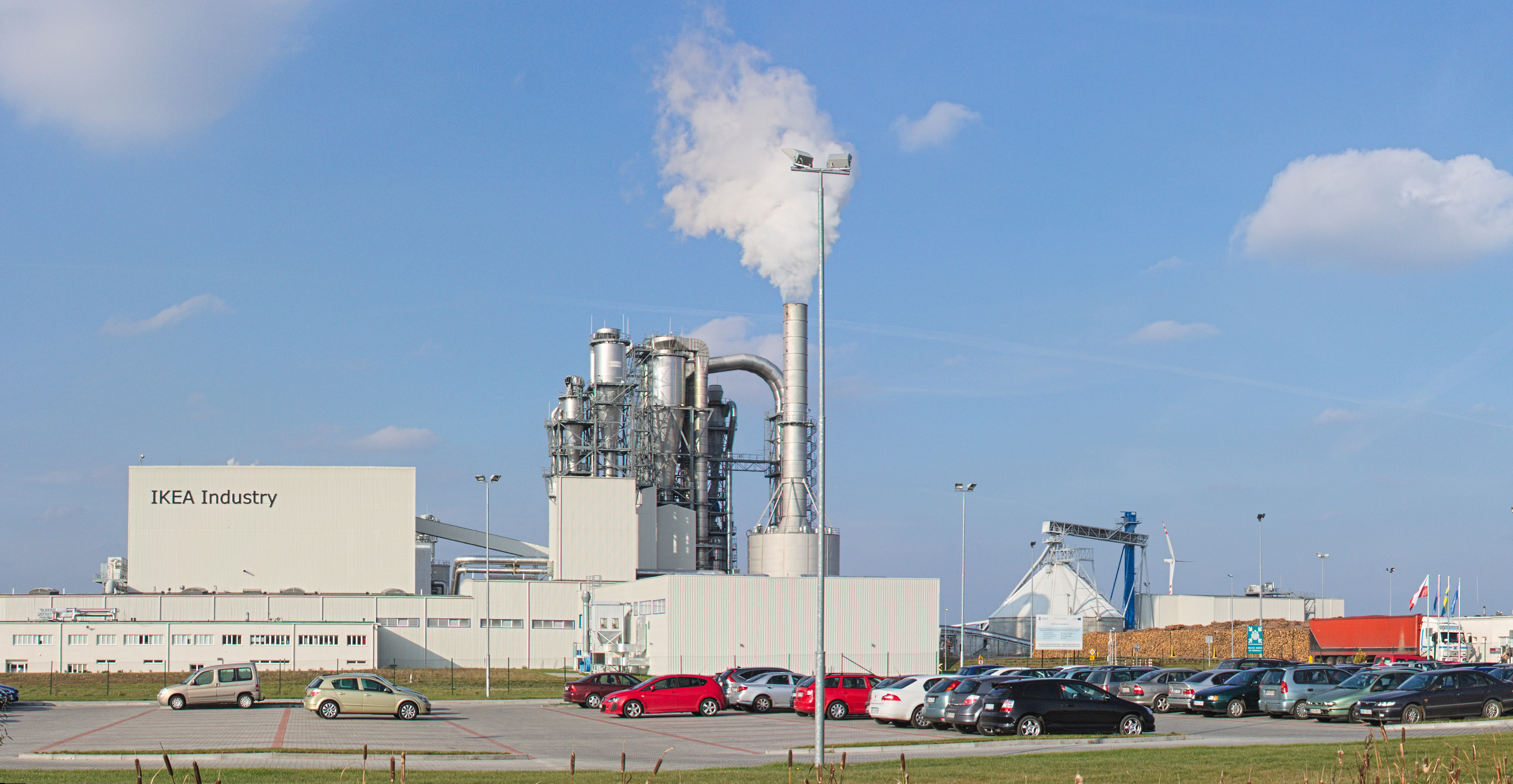
IKEA Industry factory in Koszki, Poland

Although IKEA originated in Sweden, its household products and furniture products are manufactured in many different countries, in order to achieve cost efficiency. For most of its products, the final assembly is performed by the end-user (consumer).

Swedwood, an IKEA subsidiary, produces all of the company's wood-based products, with the largest Swedwood factory located in Southern Poland. According to the subsidiary, over 16,000 employees across 50 sites in 10 countries manufacture the 100 million pieces of furniture that IKEA sells annually. IKEA furniture uses the hardwood alternative particle board. Hultsfred, a factory in southern Sweden, is the company's sole supplier.

Distribution centre efficiency and flexibility have been one of IKEA's ongoing priorities, and thus it has implemented automated, robotic warehouse systems and warehouse management systems (WMS). Such systems facilitate a merger of the traditional retail and mail order sales channels into an omni-channel fulfillment model.

In the 1980s under the rule of the Romanian dictator Nicolae Ceaușescu, Romania's secret police, the Securitate, received six-figure payments from IKEA. According to declassified files at the National College for Studying the Securitate Archives, IKEA agreed to overcharge for products made in Romania and some of the overpayment funds were deposited into an account controlled by the Securitate.

=== Labour practices ===
During the 1980s, IKEA kept its costs down by using production facilities in East Germany. A portion of the workforce at those factories consisted of political prisoners. This fact, revealed in a report by Ernst & Young commissioned by the company, resulted from the intermingling of criminals and political dissidents in the state-owned production facilities IKEA contracted with, a practice which was generally known in West Germany. IKEA was one of a number of companies, including West German firms, which benefited from this practice. The investigation resulted from attempts by former political prisoners to obtain compensation. In November 2012, IKEA admitted being aware at the time of the possibility of use of forced labour and failing to exercise sufficient control to identify and avoid it. A summary of the Ernst & Young report was released on 16 November 2012.

In 2018, Ikea was accused of union busting when employees sought to organize, using such tactics as captive audience meetings.

IKEA was named one of the 100 Best Companies for Working Mothers in 2004 and 2005 by Working Mothers magazine. It ranked 80 in Fortune's 200 Best Companies to Work For in 2006 and in October 2008, IKEA Canada LP was named one of "Canada's Top 100 Employers" by Mediacorp Canada Inc.

== Environmental initiatives ==
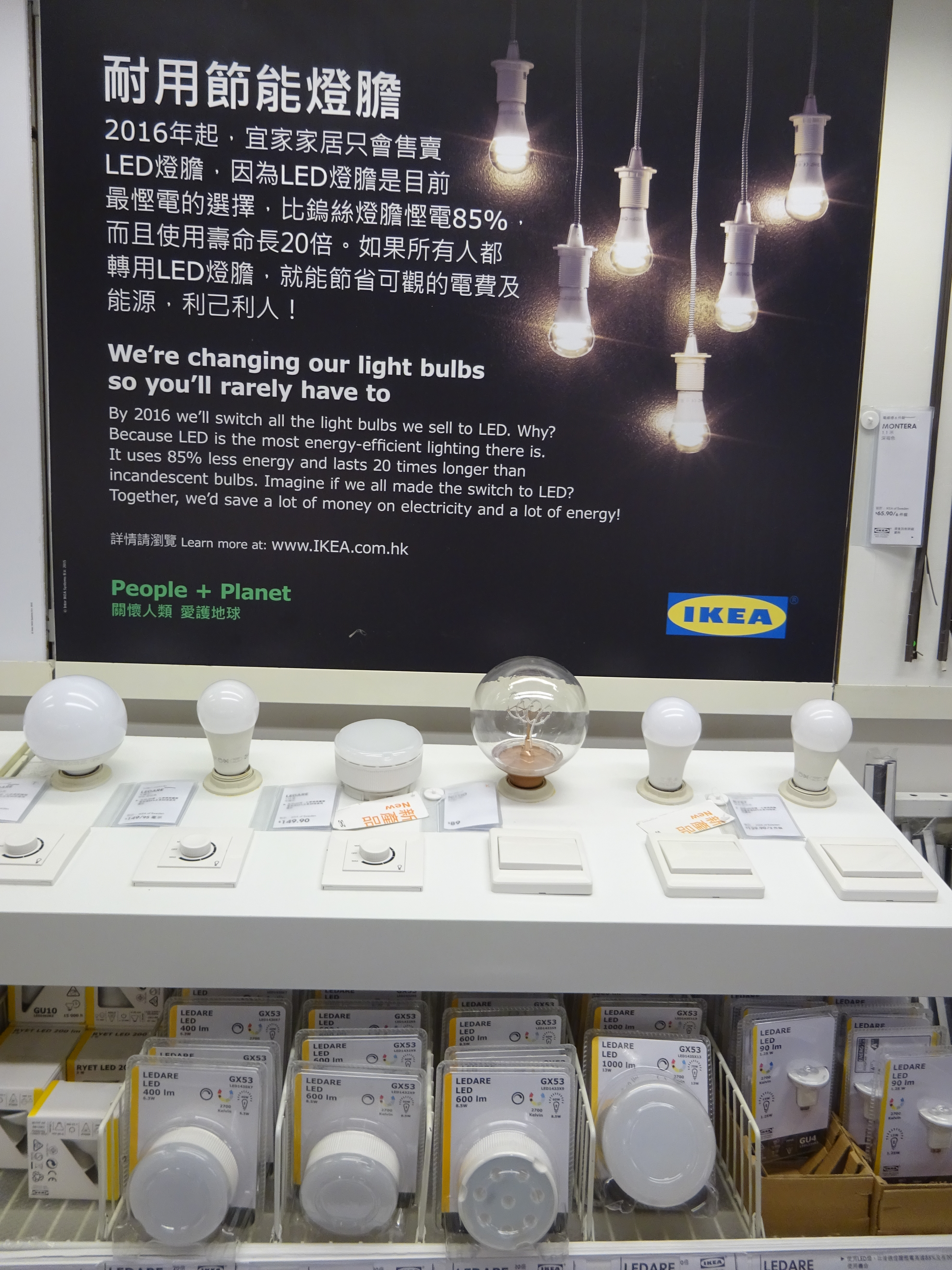
LED lamp display at an IKEA in Hong Kong

=== Umbrella initiatives ===
After initial environmental issues like the highly publicized formaldehyde scandals in the early 1980s and 1992, IKEA took a proactive stance on environmental issues and tried to prevent future incidents through a variety of measures. In 1990, IKEA invited Karl-Henrik Robèrt, founder of the Natural Step, to address its board of directors. Robert's system conditions for sustainability provided a strategic approach to improving the company's environmental performance. In 1990, IKEA adopted the Natural Step framework as the basis for its environmental plan. This led to the development of an Environmental Action Plan, which was adopted in 1992. The plan focused on structural change, allowing IKEA to "maximize the impact of resources invested and reduce the energy necessary to address isolated issues". The environmental measures taken include the following:

1. Replacing polyvinylchloride (PVC) in wallpapers, home textiles, shower curtains, lampshades, and furniture – PVC has been eliminated from packaging and is being phased out in electric cables;
2. Minimizing the use of formaldehyde in its products, including textiles;
3. Eliminating acid-curing lacquers;
4. Producing a model of chair (OGLA) made from 100% post-consumer plastic waste;
5. Introducing a series of air-inflatable furniture products into the product line. Such products reduce the use of raw materials for framing and stuffing and reduce transportation weight and volume to about 15% of that of conventional furniture;
6. Reducing the use of chromium for metal surface treatment;
7. Limiting the use of substances such as cadmium, lead, PCB, PCP, and Azo pigments;
8. Using wood from responsibly managed forests that replant and maintain biological diversity;
9. Using only recyclable materials for flat packaging and "pure" (non-mixed) materials for packaging to assist in recycling;
10. Introducing rental bicycles with trailers for customers in Denmark.

In 2000, IKEA introduced its code of conduct for suppliers that covers social, safety, and environmental questions. Today, IKEA has around 60 auditors who perform hundreds of supplier audits every year. The main purpose of these audits is to make sure that the IKEA suppliers follow the law in each country where they are based.

As of March 2018, IKEA has signed on with 25 other companies to participate in the British Retail Consortium's Better Retail Better World initiative, which challenges companies to meet objectives outlined by the United Nations Sustainable Development Goals.

=== Product life cycle ===
To make IKEA a more sustainable company, a product life cycle was created. For the idea stage, products should be flat-packed so that more items can be shipped at once; products should also be easier to dismantle and recycle. Raw materials are used, and since wood and cotton are two of IKEA's most important manufacturing products, the company works with environmentally friendly forests and cotton, whereby the excessive use of chemicals and water is avoided.

IKEA stores recycle waste and many run on renewable energy. All employees are trained in environmental and social responsibility, while public transit is one of the priorities when the location of stores is considered. Also, the coffee and chocolate served at IKEA stores are UTZ Certified.

The last stage of the life cycle is the end of life. Most IKEA stores recycle light bulbs and drained batteries, and the company is also exploring the recycling of sofas and other home furnishing products.

=== Energy sources ===
In August 2008, IKEA announced that it had created IKEA GreenTech, a €50 million venture capital fund. Located in Lund (a university town in Sweden), it will invest in 8–10 companies in the coming five years with a focus on solar panels, alternative light sources, product materials, energy efficiency, and water saving and purification. The aim is to commercialise green technologies for sale in IKEA stores within 3–4 years.

On 17 February 2011, IKEA announced its plans to develop a wind farm in Dalarna County, Sweden, furthering its goal of using only renewable energy to fuel its operations. As of June 2012, 17 United States IKEA stores are powered by solar panels, with 22 additional installations in progress, and IKEA owns the 165 MW Cameron Wind farm in Cameron County on the South Texas coast and a 42 MW coastal wind farm in Finland.

In September 2019, IKEA announced that it would be investing $2.8 billion in renewable energy infrastructure. The company is targeting making its entire supply chain climate positive by 2030.

=== Sourcing of wood ===
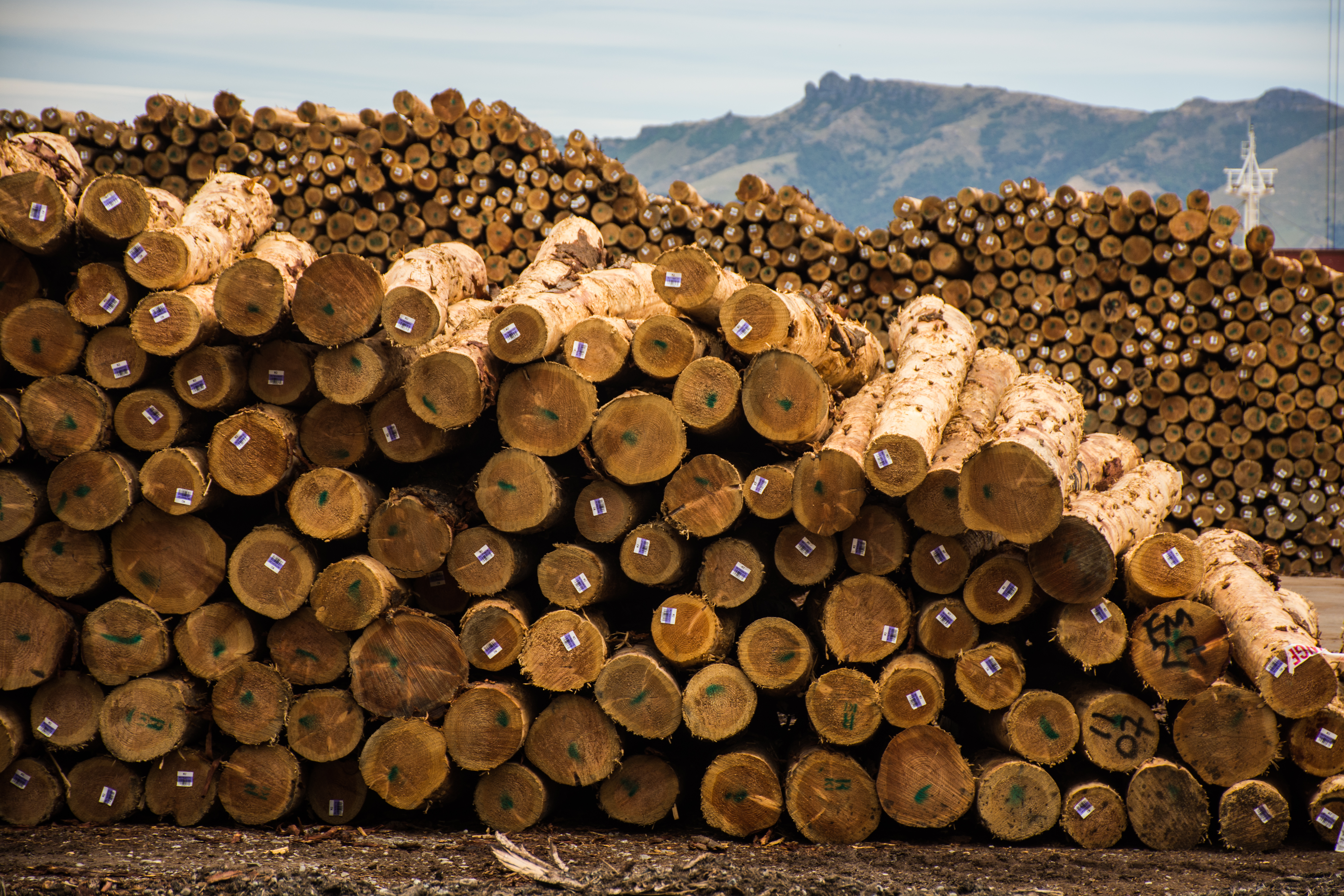
IKEA consumes roughly 21 million cubic meters of wood annually

The group is responsible for approximately 1% of world commercial-product wood consumption, making it the largest individual user of wood in the world. IKEA claims to use 99.5% recycled or FSC-certified wood. However, IKEA has been shown to be involved in unsustainable and most likely illegal logging of old-growth and protected forests in multiple Eastern European countries in recent years.

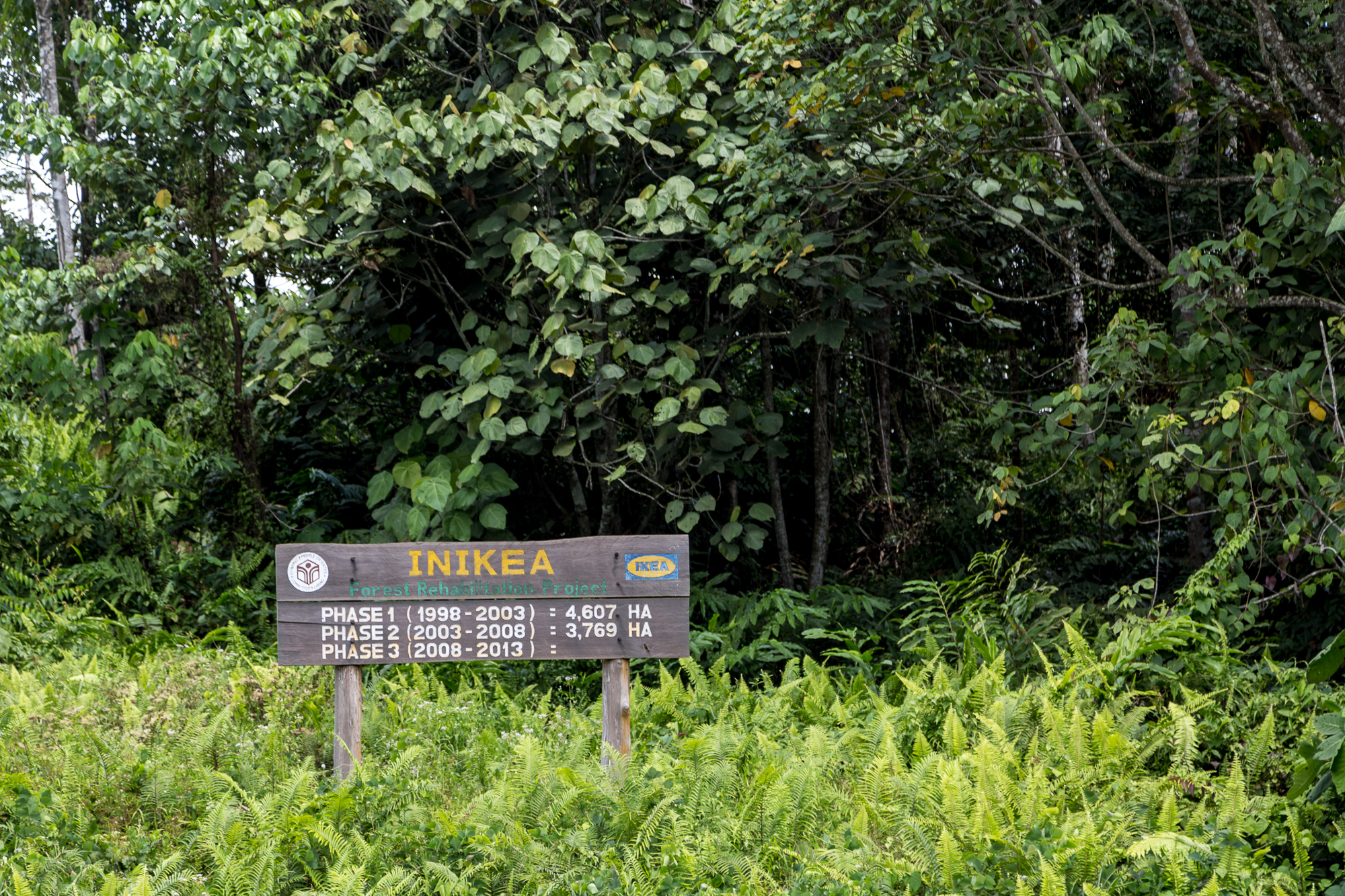
The INIKEA Forest Rehabilitation Project in Sabah, Malaysia, a major environmental initiative funded by IKEA to restore degraded rainforest landscapes in the Maliau Basin

According to IKEA's 2021 Sustainability Report, 99.5% of all wood that the company uses is either recycled or meets the standards of the Forest Stewardship Council. IKEA states that "[a]ll wood used for IKEA products must meet our critical requirements that ensure it's not (e.g.) sourced from illegally harvested forests [...]". However, despite these claims, IKEA has been involved in unsustainable and most likely illegal logging of wood in multiple Eastern European countries in recent years. It has been accused of greenwashing by organisations such as Corporate Europe Observatory and Greenpeace which criticized the company's logging practices in Russian, Romanian and Ukrainian forests.

IKEA owns about 55,000 hectares (136,000 acres) of forest in the US and about 180,000 hectares (450,000 acres) in Europe.

On 14 January 2021, IKEA announced that Ingka Investments had acquired approximately 4,386 hectares (10,840 acres) near the Altamaha River Basin in the US state of Georgia from The Conservation Fund. The acquisition comes with the agreement "to protect the land from fragmentation, restore the longleaf pine forest, and safe-guard the habitat of the gopher tortoise".

IKEA is reported to be the largest private landowner in Romania since 2015.

=== Use of wood ===
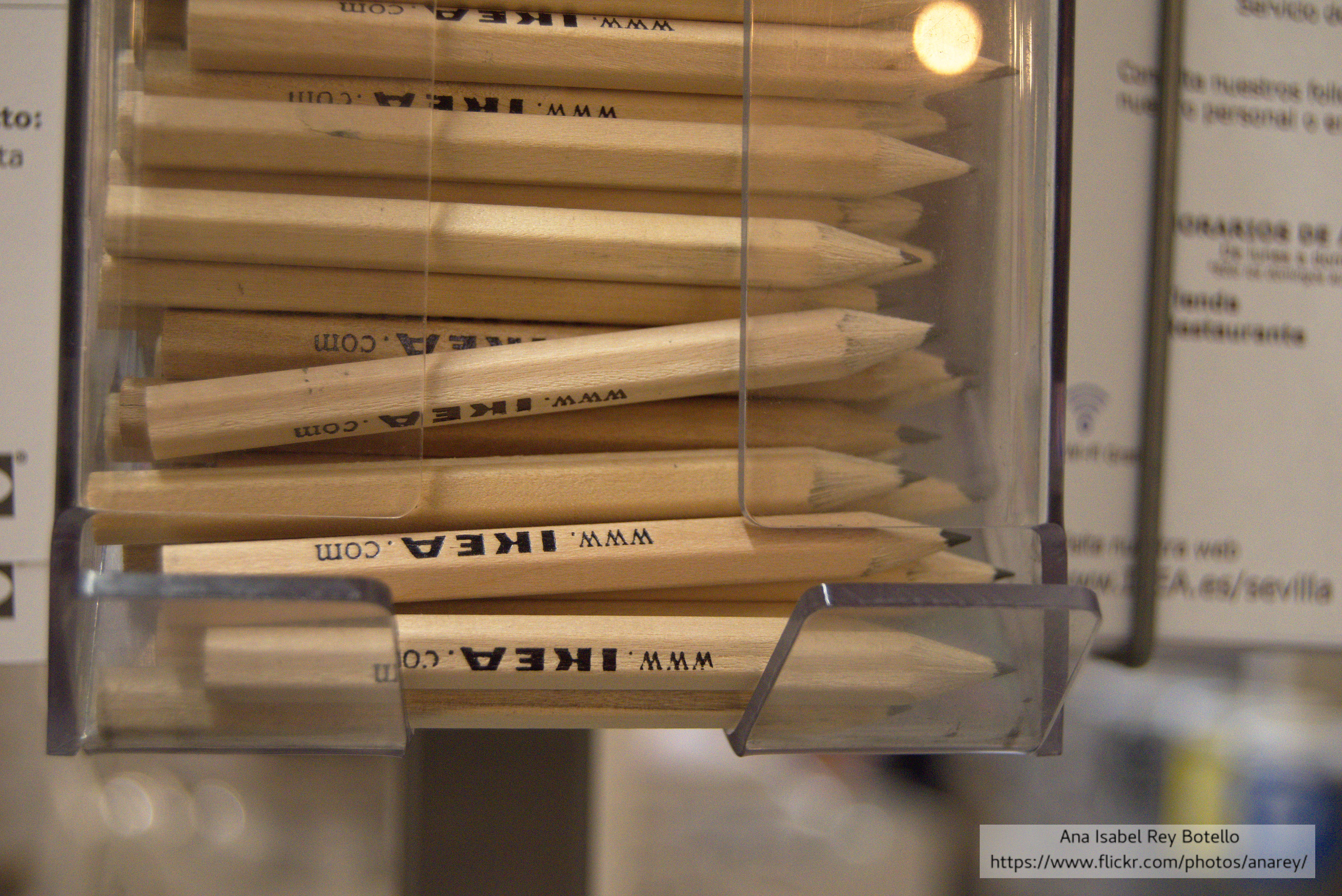
IKEA produces roughly 100 million pencils annually, utilizing leftover wood scraps that would otherwise be wasted.

In 2011, the company examined its wood consumption and noticed that almost half of its global pine and spruce consumption was for the fabrication of pallets. The company consequently started a transition to the use of paper pallets and the "OptiLedge system". The OptiLedge product is completely recyclable, made from 100% virgin high-impact copolymer polypropylene (PP) plastic. The system is a "unit load alternative to the use of a pallet. The system consists of the OptiLedge (usually used in pairs), aligned and strapped to the bottom carton to form a base layer upon which to stack more products. Corner boards are used when strapping to minimize the potential for package compression." The conversion began in Germany and Japan, before its introduction into the rest of Europe and North America. The system has been marketed to other companies, and IKEA has formed the OptiLedge company to manage and sell the product.

=== Packaging and bags ===
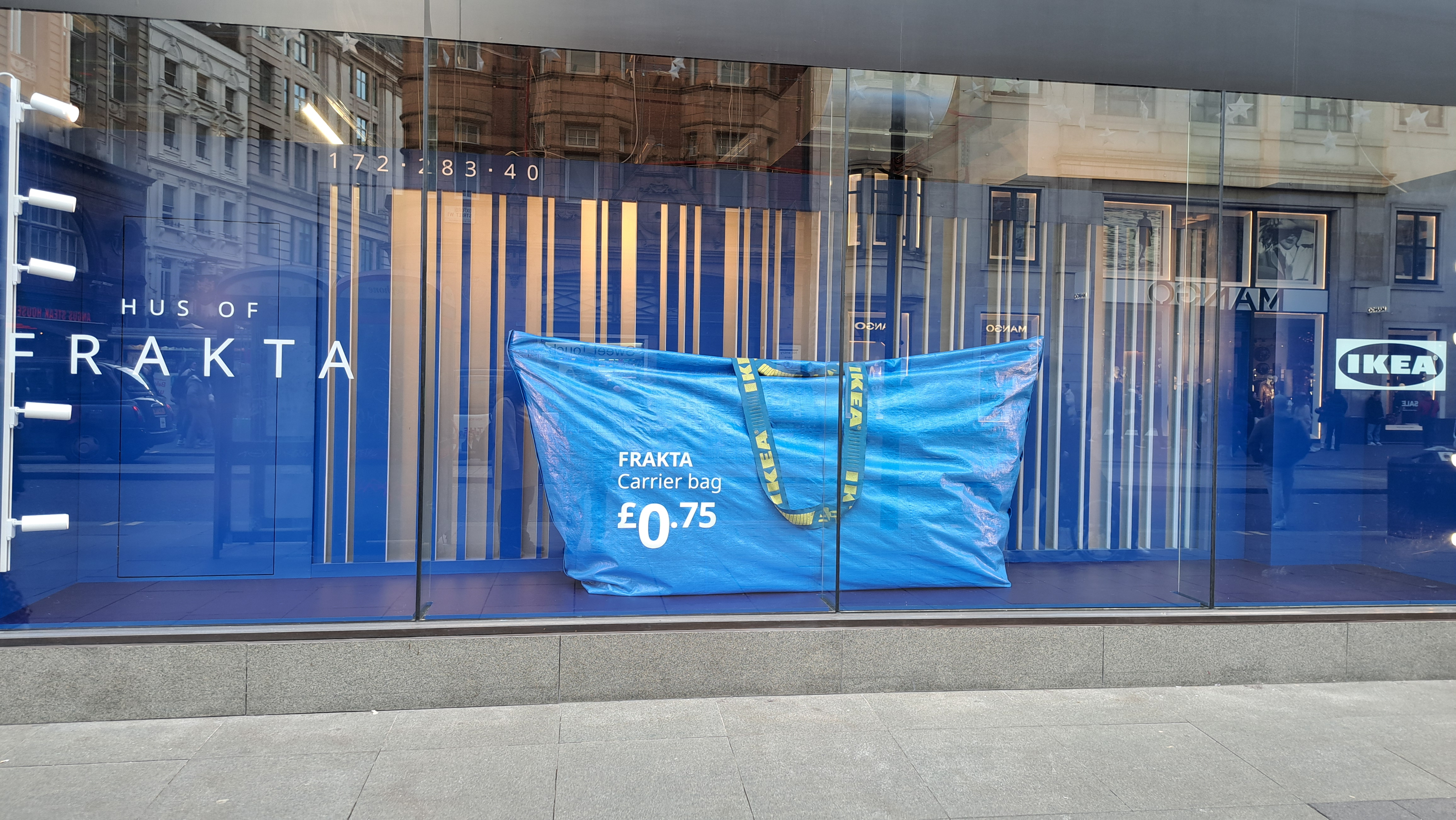
Blue IKEA recyclable shopping bag

Since March 2013, IKEA has stopped providing plastic bags to customers, but offers reusable bags for sale. The IKEA restaurants also only offer reusable plates, knives, forks, spoons, etc. Toilets in some IKEA WC-rooms have been outfitted with dual-function flushers. IKEA has recycling bins for compact fluorescent lamps (CFLs), energy-saving bulbs, and batteries.

In 2001, IKEA was one of the first companies to operate its own cross-border goods trains through several countries in Europe.

=== Electric vehicles ===
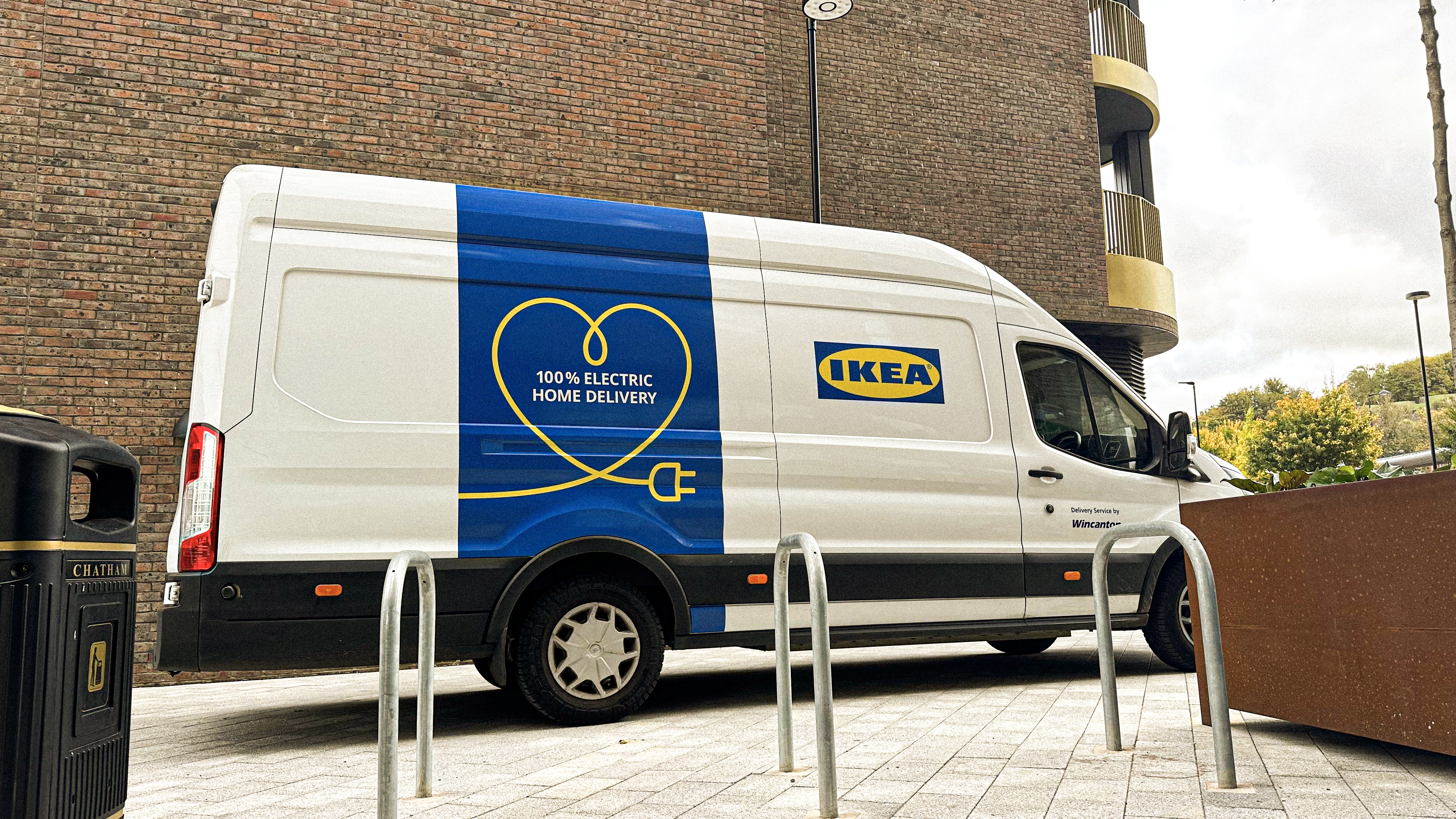
A 100% electric IKEA delivery van at Chatham Waterfront, Kent, England.

IKEA has expanded its sustainability plan in the UK to include electric car charge points for customers at all locations by the end of 2013. The effort will include Nissan and Ecotricity and promise to deliver an 80% charge in 30 minutes.

From 2016, IKEA has only sold energy-efficient LED lightbulbs, lamps, and light fixtures. LED lightbulbs use as little as 15% of the power of a regular incandescent light bulb.

== Donations made by IKEA ==
The INGKA Foundation is officially dedicated to promoting "innovations in architecture and interior design". The net worth of the foundation exceeded the net worth of the much better known Gates Foundation (now the largest private foundation in the world) for a period. However, most of the Group's profit is spent on investment.

IKEA is involved in several international charitable causes, particularly in partnership with UNICEF, including:

- In the wake of the 2004 Indian Ocean earthquake and tsunami, IKEA Australia agreed to match dollar-for-dollar co-workers' donations and donated all sales of the IKEA Blue Bag to the cause.
- After the 2005 Kashmir earthquake, IKEA gave 500,000 blankets to the relief effort in the region.
- IKEA has provided furniture for over 100 "bridge schools" in Liberia.
- Following the 2008 Sichuan earthquake in China, IKEA Beijing sold an alligator toy for 40 yuan (US$5.83, €3.70) with all income going to the children in the earthquake-struck area.
- In 2013, IKEA donated more than $2.6 million to UNICEF to help children and families affected by Typhoon Haiyan in the Philippines.

IKEA also supports American Forests to restore forests and reduce pollution.

On 3 March 2022, IKEA announced €20 million donation to UNHCR for relief support of Ukrainians who suffer from the 2022 Russian invasion of Ukraine.

IKEA donated €10 million to Doctors Without Borders for its work in Syria in response to the 2023 Turkey–Syria earthquake.

=== IKEA Social Initiative ===
In September 2005, IKEA Social Initiative was formed to manage the company's social involvement on a global level. IKEA Social Initiative is headed by Marianne Barner.

The main partners of IKEA Social Initiative are UNICEF and Save the Children.

On 23 February 2009, at the ECOSOC event in New York, UNICEF announced that IKEA Social Initiative had become the agency's largest corporate partner, with total commitments of more than US$180 million (£281,079,000).

Examples of involvement:

- The IKEA Social Initiative contributes €1 (£1.73) to UNICEF and Save the Children from each soft toy sold during the holiday seasons, raising a total of €16.7 million (£28.91 million) so far. In 2013, an IKEA soft toy, Lufsig, created a storm and sold out in Hong Kong and in Southern China because it had been misnamed in Chinese.
- The IKEA Social Initiative provided soft toys to children in Burma after Cyclone Nargis.
- Starting in June 2009, for every Sunnan solar-powered lamp sold in IKEA stores worldwide, IKEA Social Initiative will donate one Sunnan with the help of UNICEF.
- In September 2011, the IKEA Foundation pledged to donate $62 million to help Somali refugees in Kenya.
- According to The Economist, however, IKEA's charitable giving is meager, "barely a rounding error in the foundation's assets".

In 2009, Sweden's largest television station, SVT, revealed that IKEA's money—the three per cent collection from each store—does not actually go to a charitable foundation in the Netherlands, as IKEA has said. Inter IKEA is owned by a foundation in Liechtenstein, called Interogo, which has amassed $12 billion (£18 billion), and is controlled by the Kamprad family.

== Marketing ==
=== Catalogue ===
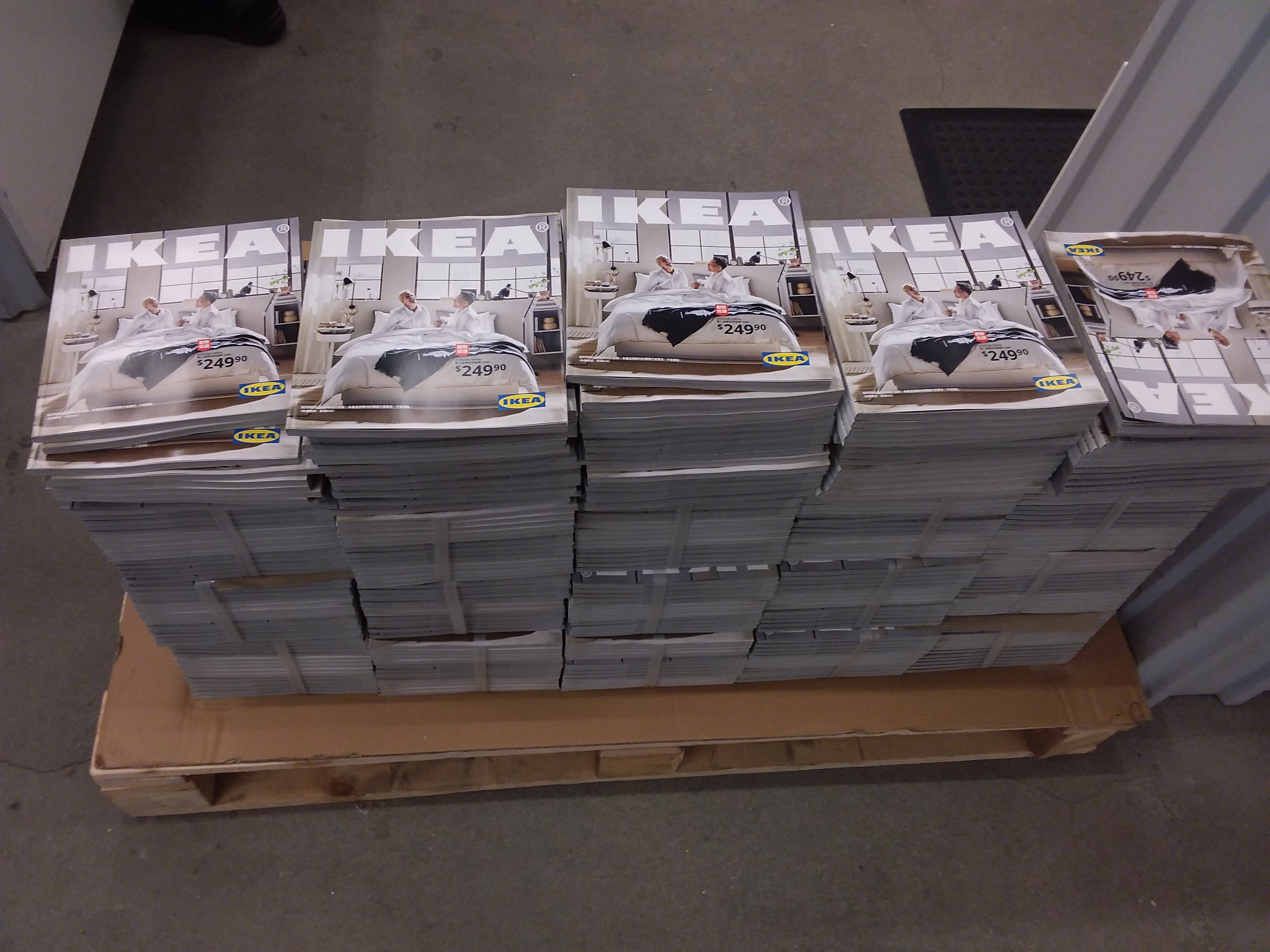
After a 70-year run from 1951 to 2021, IKEA retired its print catalogue

IKEA used to publish an annual catalogue, first published in Swedish in 1951. It was considered to be the main marketing tool of the company, consuming 70% of its annual marketing budget. The catalogue was distributed both in stores and by mail, with most of it produced by IKEA Communications AB in IKEA's hometown of Älmhult, Sweden. At its peak in 2016, 200 million copies of the catalogue were distributed in 32 languages to more than 50 markets. In December 2020, IKEA announced that it would cease publication of both the print and digital versions of the catalogue, with the 2021 edition (released in 2020) being the final edition.

=== IKEA Family ===
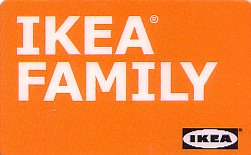
A typical IKEA Family card

In common with some other retailers, IKEA launched a loyalty card called "IKEA Family". The card is free of charge and can be used to obtain discounts on certain products found in-store. It is available worldwide. In conjunction with the card, IKEA also publishes and sells a printed quarterly magazine titled IKEA Family Live which supplements the card and catalogue. The magazine is already printed in thirteen languages and an English edition for the United Kingdom was launched in February 2007. It is expected to have a subscription of over 500,000.

=== IKEA Place app ===
On 12 September 2017, IKEA announced the augmented reality app, IKEA Place, following by Apple's release of its ARkit technology and iOS 11. IKEA Place helps consumers to visualize true to scale IKEA products into real environment.

=== Advertising ===
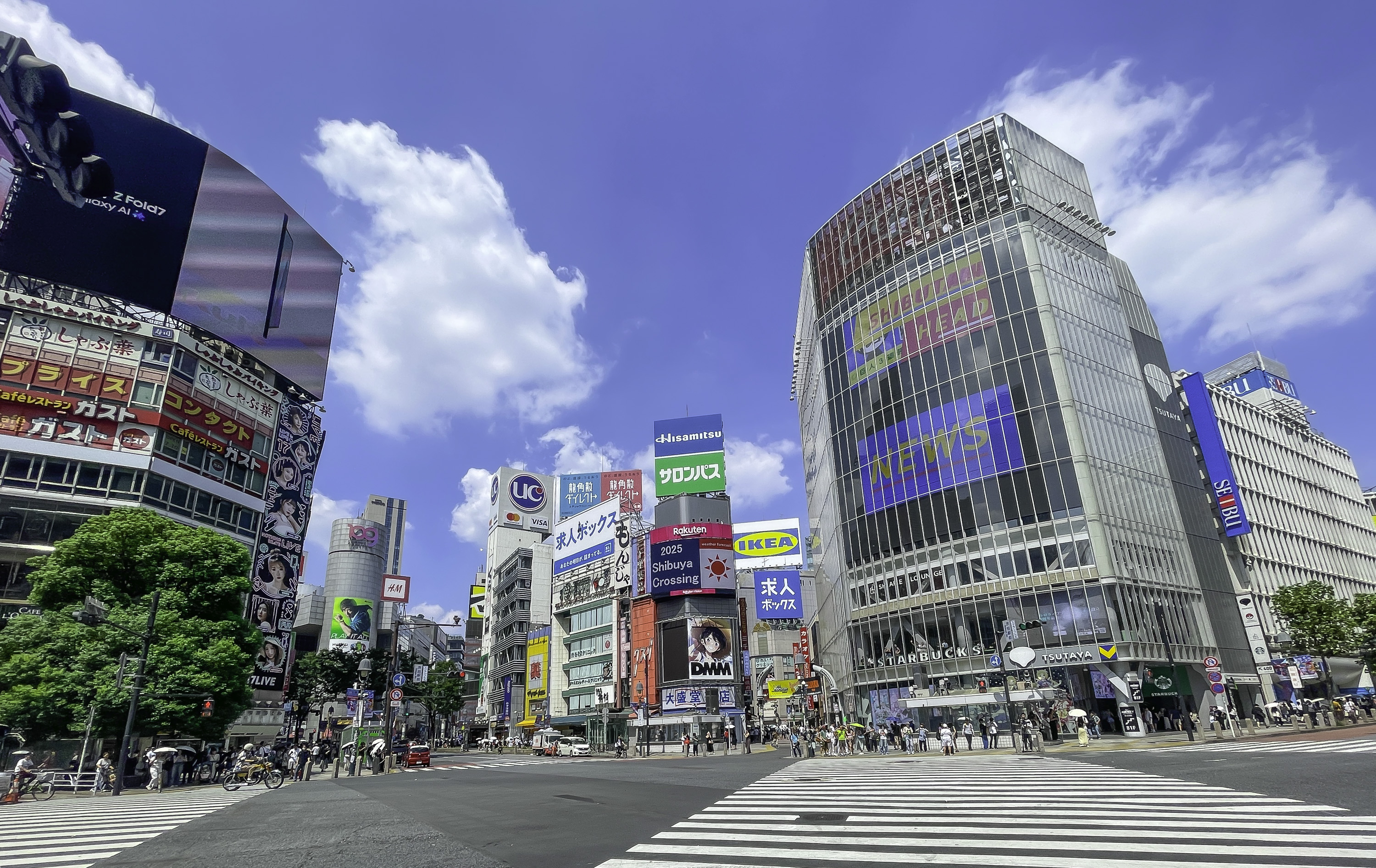
The IKEA advertising at Shibuya Crossing in Tokyo

In 1994, IKEA ran a commercial in the United States, titled Dining Room, widely thought to be the first to feature a homosexual couple; it aired for several weeks before being withdrawn after calls for a boycott and a bomb threat directed at IKEA stores. Other IKEA commercials appeal to the wider LGBTQ community, one featuring a transgender woman.

In 2002, the inaugural television component of the "Unböring" campaign, titled Lamp, went on to win several awards, including a Grand Clio, Golds at the London International Awards and the ANDY Awards, and the Grand Prix at the Cannes Lions International Advertising Festival, the most prestigious awards ceremony in the advertising community.

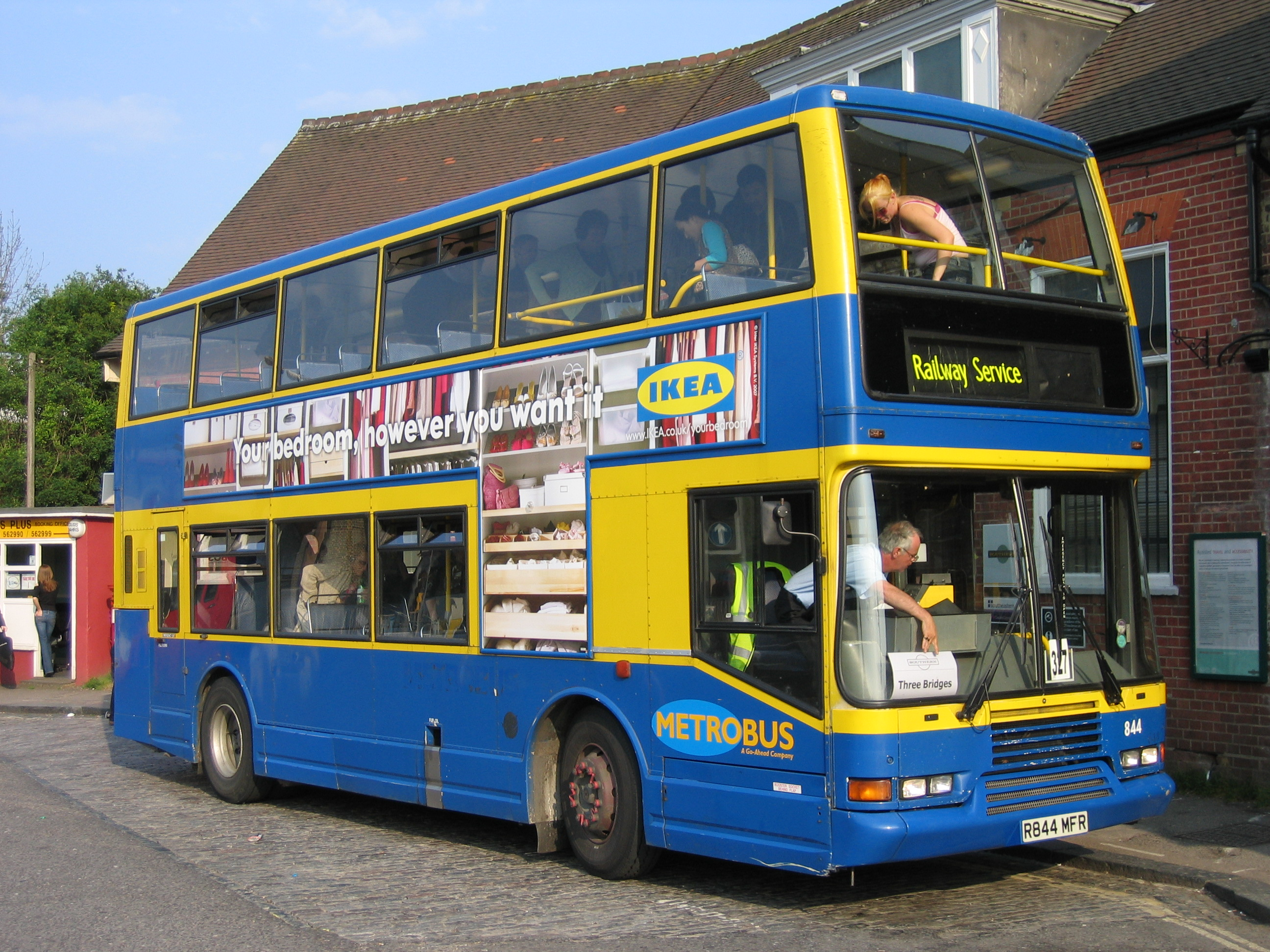
An IKEA advertisement on a British double-decker bus

In 2008, IKEA paired up with the makers of the video game The Sims 2 to make a stuff pack called IKEA Home Stuff, featuring many IKEA products. It was released on 24 June 2008 in North America and on 26 June 2008 in Europe. It is the second stuff pack with a major brand, the first being The Sims 2 H&M Fashion Stuff.

In November 2008, a subway train decorated in IKEA style was introduced in Novosibirsk, Russia. Four cars were turned into a mobile showroom of the Swedish design. The redesigned train, which features colourful seats and fancy curtains, carried passengers until 6 June 2009.

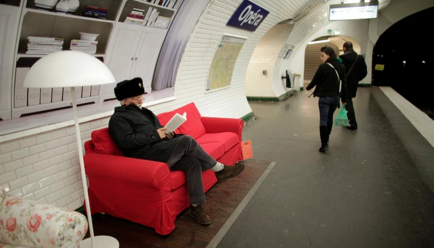
IKEA marketing campaign in the Paris Métro

In March 2010, IKEA developed an event in four important Métro stations in Paris, in which furniture collections are displayed in high-traffic spots, giving potential customers a chance to check out the brand's products. The Métro walls were also filled with prints that showcase IKEA interiors.

In September 2017, IKEA launched the "IKEA Human Catalogue" campaign, in which memory champion Yanjaa Wintersoul memorized all 328 pages of the catalogue in minute detail in just a week before its launch. To prove the legitimacy and accuracy of the campaign, live demonstrations were held at press conferences in IKEA stores across Malaysia, Singapore, Thailand as well as a Facebook Live event held at the Facebook Singapore headquarters and talk show demonstrations in the US with Steve Harvey among others. The advertising campaign was hugely successful winning numerous industry awards including the Webby award 2018 for best social media campaign, an Ogilvy award and is currently a contender for the Cannes Lions 2018.

In 2020, IKEA conducted a "Buy Back Friday" campaign with a message to present a new life to old furniture instead of offering customers to buy new items for Black Friday.

In June 2021, IKEA said it had suspended adverts on GB News because of concerns the channel's content would go against its aim to be inclusive. In a statement, IKEA said: "We have safeguards in place to prevent our advertising from appearing on platforms that are not in line with our humanistic values. We are in the process of investigating how this may have occurred to ensure it won't happen again in future, and have suspended paid display advertising in the meantime."

== In popular culture ==
In 2018, the company's plush toy shark "Blåhaj" was widely used in an internet meme, with social media users posting humorous photos of it in their homes.

IKEA has been referenced a number of times in novelty music. In 2003, American musician Jonathan Coulton released the song "IKEA" on the album Smoking Monkey. In 2005, British musician Mitch Benn with the band The Distractions penned the novelty song "Ikea". In December 2019, comedy metal band Nanowar of Steel released the song Valhallelujah which is dedicated to Odin and IKEA. The music video features a longship with the sail adorned with the IKEA logo, and a fictional IKEA catalogue written in Old Norse runes. The lyrics include references to various IKEA products, namely BEDDINGE, KIVIK, VITTSJÖ, KNOPPARP, BESTÅ and SLATTUM.

American musician Sabrina Carpenter references IKEA in her 2025 song "Tears".

The 1999 American movie Fight Club references IKEA furniture to show the consumerist culture of modern times.

IKEA stores have been featured in many works of fiction. Some examples include:

- The 1986 Swedish crime comedy film Jönssonligan dyker upp igen features a failed robbery of the IKEA store at Kungens Kurva by the eponymous gang.
- The 2009 American film 500 Days of Summer features the main characters flirting around the showroom of an IKEA store. It was filmed on location at an IKEA store. One of the tracks from the film's score is entitled "Ikea" to reflect the scene.
- IKEA Heights, a 2009 comedic melodrama web series, was filmed without permission in an IKEA store.
- The 2014 novel The Extraordinary Journey of the Fakir Who Got Trapped in an Ikea Wardrobe by French author Romain Puertolas features a trip to an IKEA store in Paris, France.
- The 2014 horror comedy novel Horrorstör is set in a haunted store called ORSK, modelled on IKEA, and the novel is designed to look like the IKEA catalogue.
- The SCP Foundation, an online collaborative horror writing community documenting fictional anomalies, features an entry (numbered SCP-3008) originating in 2017 about an IKEA store which is notably bigger on the inside than its exterior implies, and from which escaping is difficult. The interior of this store is populated by entities dressed in IKEA staff attire, resembling highly deformed, faceless humanoids, which are normally passive during the "day" (when the lights are switched on) but become aggressive during the "night" (when the lights are switched off), informing 'customers' to "leave the store", and enforcing this if not listened to.
- The 2021 children's picture book Bears Out of The Box features IKEA's Fabler Bjorn doll, who is trying to venture outside the store.

== Ecological sustainability, environmental adaptation, and working conditions ==
IKEA has presented itself as a sustainable company and stated that sustainability is its foremost priority, that nearly all new products are environmentally friendly, and that it takes responsibility globally. Friends of the Earth Sweden has accused IKEA of greenwashing, arguing that its low prices and marketing promote a disposable furniture culture and that its forestry practices conflict with its sustainability claims.

== See also ==
- Criticism of IKEA
- IKEA effect
