= List of furniture museums =

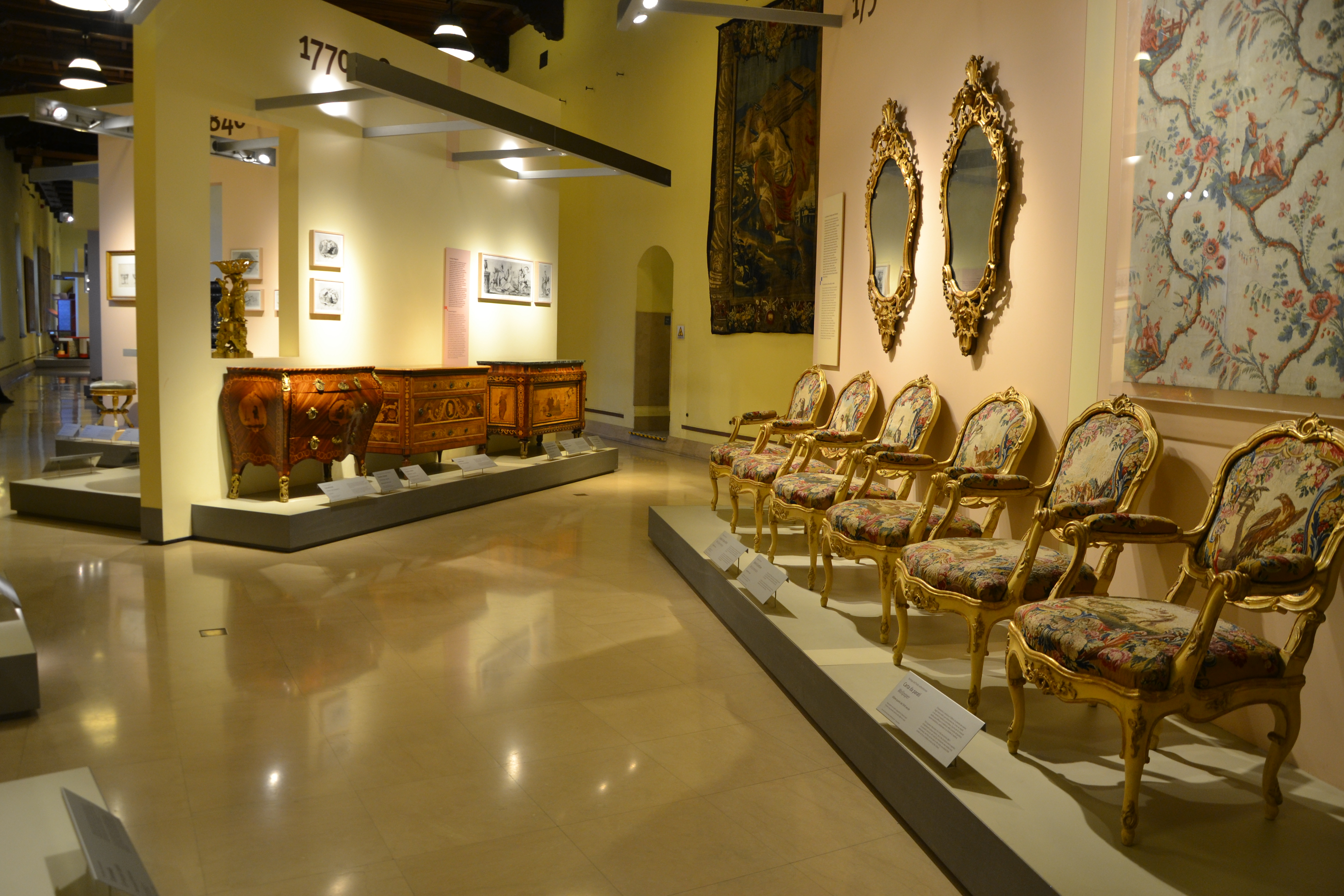
Interior of Antique Furniture & Wooden Sculpture Museum in Milan

A furniture museum is a museum with exhibits relating to the history and art of furniture. This is a list of articles about notable furniture museums. Many other types of museums also host furniture exhibits.

== List of furniture museums ==
- Antique Furniture & Wooden Sculpture Museum in Milan
- Chinese Furniture Museum in Taoyuan
- Furniture Manufacturing Eco Museum in Tainan
- Furniture Museum in Aure
- High Wycombe Chair Making Museum in High Wycombe
- IKEA Museum in Älmhult, Sweden
- The Museum of Furniture Studies in Älmhult (previously in Stockholm)
- Imperial Furniture Collection in Vienna
- Louis Vouland Museum in Avignon
- Wycombe Museum in High Wycombe
