= Sykkylven =

Sykkylven may refer to:

== Places ==
- Sykkylven Municipality, a municipality in Møre og Romsdal county, Norway
- Aure, or Sykkylven, a village within Sykkylven Municipality in Møre og Romsdal county, Norway
- Sykkylven Church, a church in Sykkylven Municipality in Møre og Romsdal county, Norway
- Sykkylven Bridge, a bridge in Sykkylven Municipality in Møre og Romsdal county, Norway

== Other ==
- FK Sykkylven, an association football club based in Sykkylven Municipality in Møre og Romsdal county, Norway
- Sykkylven Energi, an energy company based in Sykkylven Municipality in Møre og Romsdal county, Norway
