= Tusvika =

Village in Sykkylven Municipality, Norway

Tusvika Tusvik
- Village
- Interactive map of Tusvika
- Location within Møre og Romsdal Location within Norway
- Coordinates: 62.3979°N 6.4693°E
- Country: Norway
- Region: Western Norway
- County: Møre og Romsdal
- District: Sunnmøre
- Municipality: Sykkylven Municipality
- Elevation: 26 m (85 ft)
- Time zone: UTC+01:00 (CET)
  - Summer (DST): UTC+02:00 (CEST)
- Post Code: 6224 Hundeidvik

Tusvika is a small village in Sykkylven Municipality in Møre og Romsdal county, Norway. It is located along the Storfjorden about 4 kilometres (2.5 mi) west of the village of Ikornnes and 8 kilometres (5.0 mi) west of the municipal center, Aure (via the Sykkylven Bridge over the Sykkylvsfjorden).

Tusvik lies in Sykkylven Municipality, not far from an industrial area, with large industries such as RAJO, Ekornes, and LK Hjelle Møbelfabrikk based here. The lake Tuvatnet is located just west of the village.
