= Furniture Museum =

Museum in Norway

Coordinates: 62°23′27.26″N 6°35′2.14″E

The Furniture Museum (Norwegian: Møbelmuseet), formerly known as the Norsk Møbelfaglig Senter ('Norwegian Furniture Design Center'), is a museum and documentation center for the furniture industry in Norway. The museum is located in Aure in Sykkylven Municipality, and it is part of the Sunnmøre Museum Foundation. The museum has a permanent display presenting the history of the furniture industry.

== See also ==
- Furniture museum
- Design museum
