= Stanislas Torrents =

French painter (1839–1916)

- Born: 23 May 1839; Marseille, France
- Died: 6 November 1916 (aged 77); Cannes, France
- Occupation: Painter

Stanislas Torrents (1839–1916) was a French painter. He was born in Marseille. His parents were Spanish. His paintings are in the collections of many museums, including the Musée Louis Vouland in Avignon.

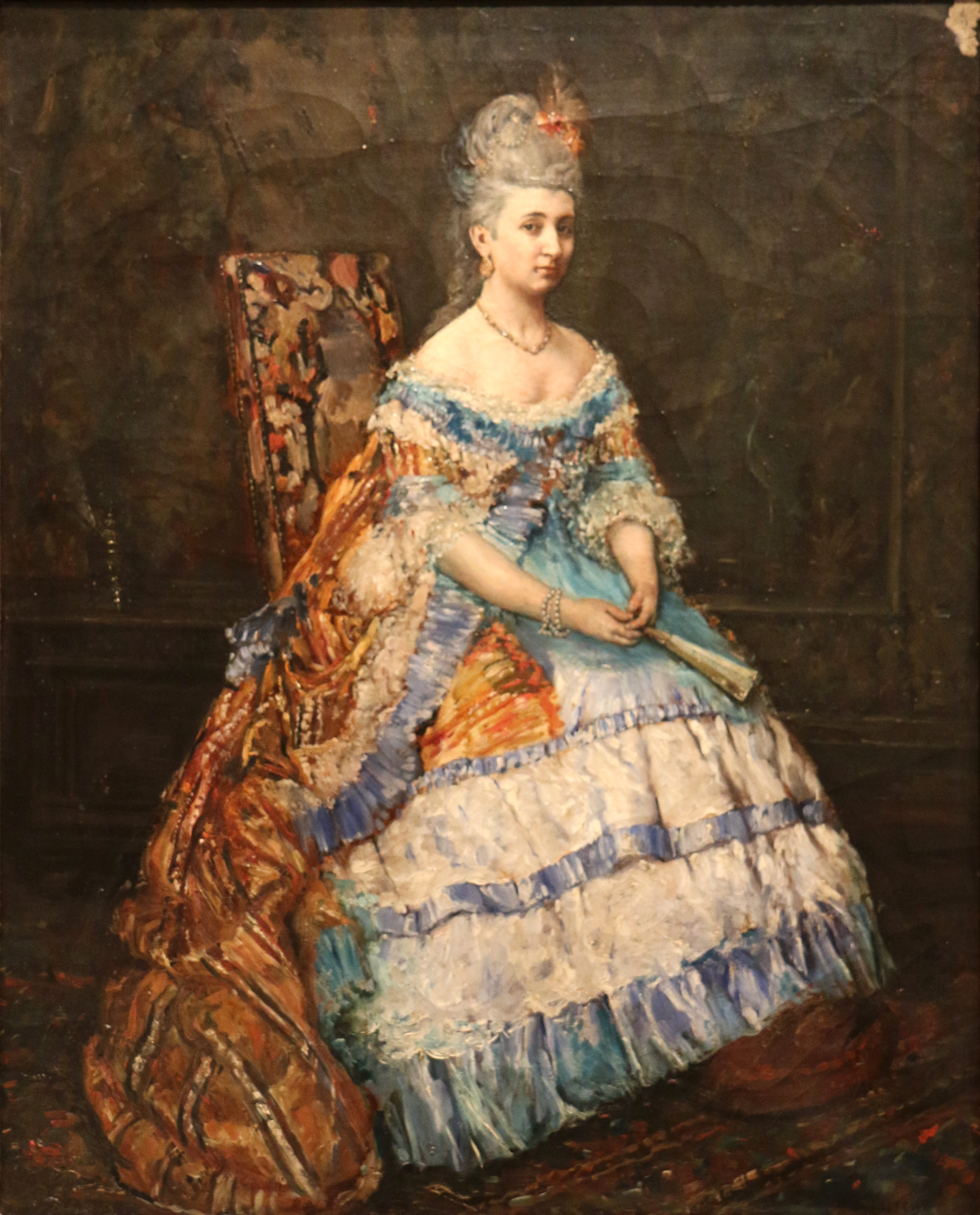
Mme Claire Charles-Roux, Avignon, musée Louis Vouland.

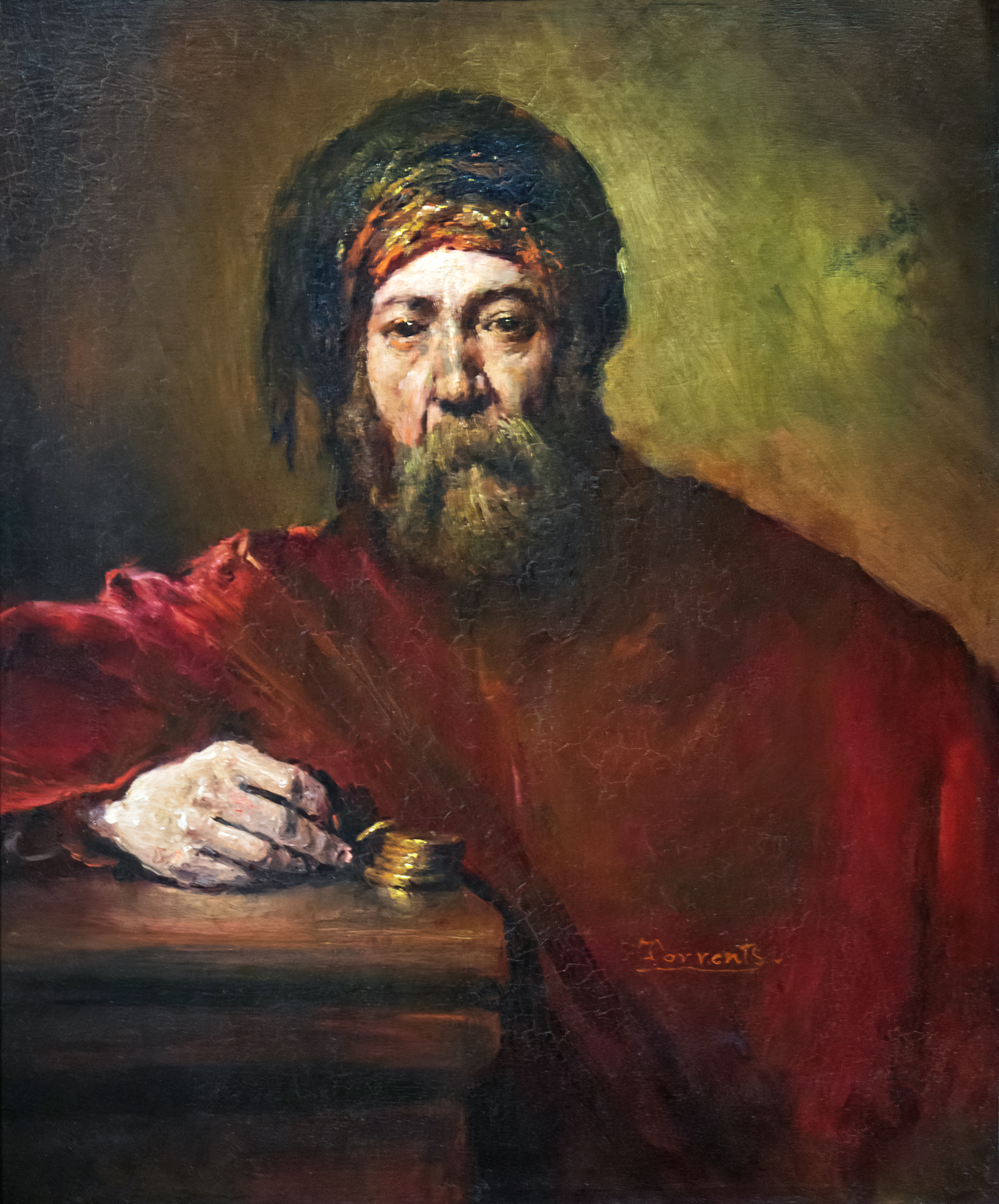
L'Usurier, musée des beaux-arts de Marseille.
