= Ikornnes Church =

Church in Møre og Romsdal, Norway

- Ikornnes kyrkje
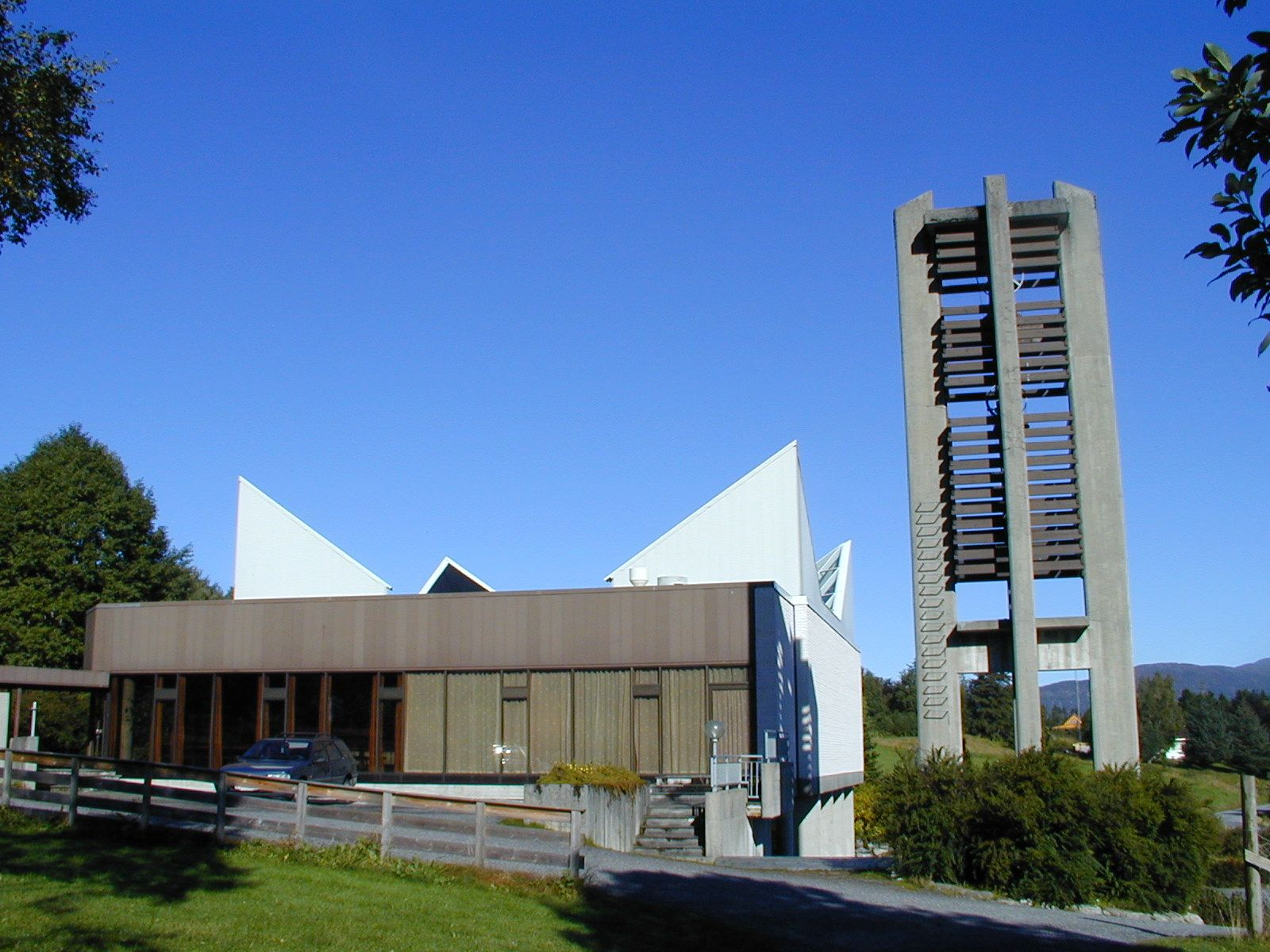
- View of the church
- Ikornnes Church
- 62°22′56″N 6°33′06″E
- Location: Sykkylven Municipality, Møre og Romsdal
- Country: Norway
- Denomination: Church of Norway
- Churchmanship: Evangelical Lutheran

History
- Former name: Ikornnes kapell
- Status: Parish church
- Founded: 1978
- Consecrated: 22 January 1978

Architecture
- Functional status: Active
- Architect: Alf Apalseth
- Architectural type: Rectangular
- Completed: 1978 (48 years ago)

Specifications
- Capacity: 350
- Materials: Brick

Administration
- Diocese: Møre bispedømme
- Deanery: Nordre Sunnmøre prosti
- Parish: Ikornnes

Ikornnes Church (Norwegian: Ikornnes kyrkje) is a parish church of the Church of Norway in Sykkylven Municipality in Møre og Romsdal county, Norway. It is located in the village of Ikornnes. It is the church for the Ikornnes parish which is part of the Nordre Sunnmøre prosti (deanery) in the Diocese of Møre. The white, brick church was built in a rectangular style in 1978 using plans drawn up by the architect Alf Apalseth. The church seats about 350 people. There is no graveyard around this church, parishioners must use the one around the nearby Sykkylven Church. The building was consecrated on 22 January 1978.

== See also ==
- List of churches in Møre
