= Sunnmøre Museum Foundation =

Coordinates: 62°28′7.49″N 6°14′9.48″E

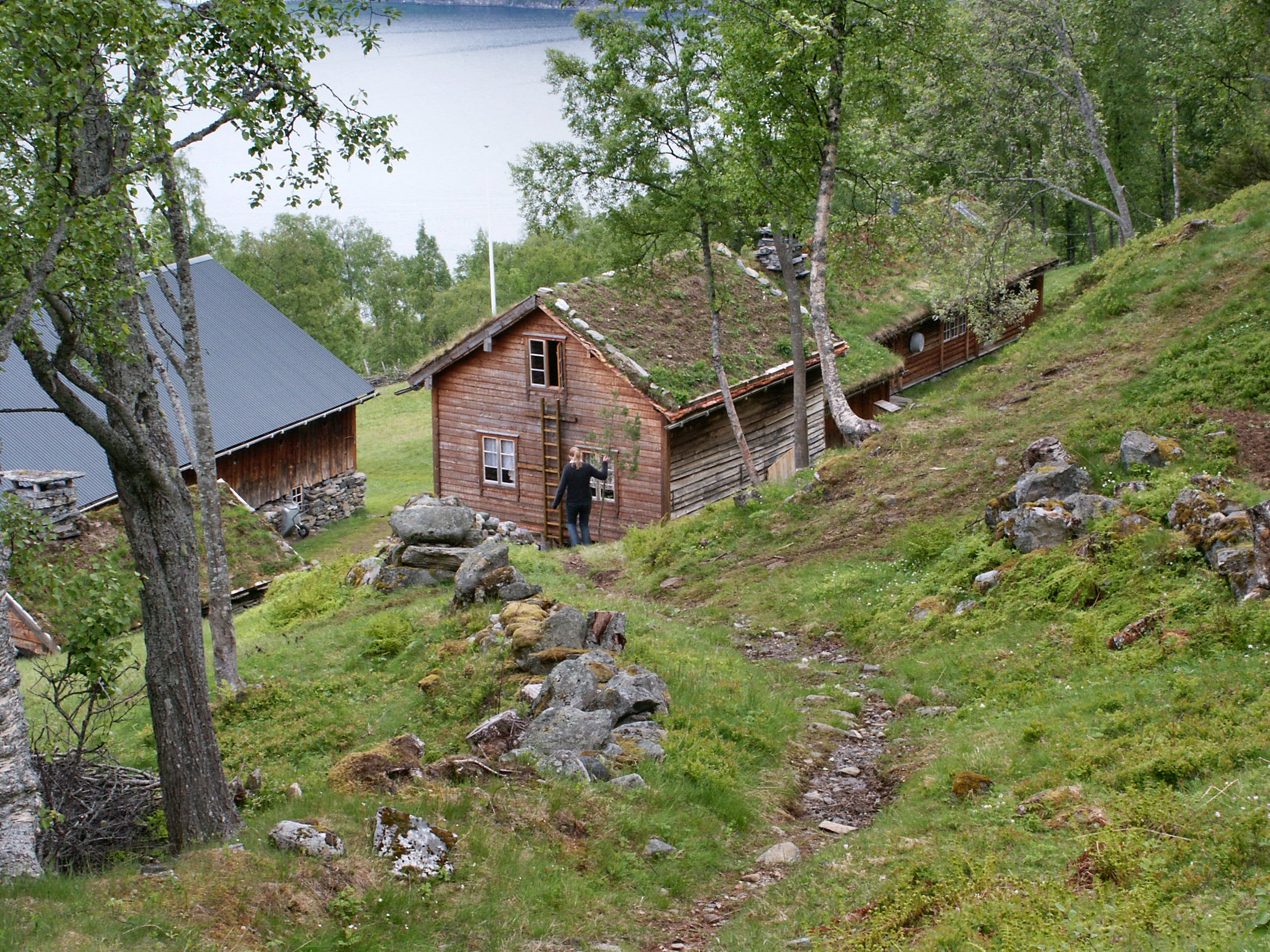
The Ytste Skotet Farm is part of the Sunnmøre Museum Foundation.

The Sunnmøre Museum Foundation (Norwegian: Stiftinga Sunnmøre Museum) is a foundation comprising 12 museums in the Sunnmøre traditional district of the western Norwegian county of Møre og Romsdal.

The museums in the foundation are:

- The Sunnmøre Museum in Borgundgavlen in Ålesund Municipality
- The Aalesund Museum and Fisheries Museum in Ålesund Municipality
- The Brudavoll Farm in Ørsta Municipality
- The Dalsfjord Lighthouse Museum in Dalsfjord in Volda Municipality
- The Godøy Coastal Museu at Godøy in Giske Municipality
- The Herøy Coastal Museum in Herøy Municipality
- The Furniture Museum in Sykkylven Municipality
- The Sivert Aarflot Museum at Ekset in Volda Municipality
- The Sykkylven Natural History Museum in Sykkylven Municipality
- The Volda Open Air Museum in Volda Municipality
- The Ytste Skotet Farm in Fjord Municipality
- The Møre og Romsdal Agricultural Museum at Gjermundnes in Vestnes Municipality
