= Slogen =

Mountain in Møre og Romsdal, Norway

- Slogen from a distance.

Highest point
- Elevation: 1,564 m (5,131 ft)
- Prominence: 551 m (1,808 ft)
- Parent peak: Råna
- Isolation: 2.9 km (1.8 mi)
- Coordinates: 62.2080°N 6.6730°E

Geography
- Interactive map of the mountain
- Location: Møre og Romsdal, Norway
- Parent range: Sunnmørsalpene
- Topo map: 1219 III Hjørundfjord

Climbing
- First ascent: 1870 (Jon Klokk)
- Easiest route: Hike

Slogen is a mountain rising up from Hjørundfjorden in Ørsta Municipality in Møre og Romsdal county, Norway. The mountain is located just west of the municipal boundary with Stranda Municipality and just north of the nearby mountain Jakta. Many famous Norwegians have been on the top of this mountain, including most notably Queen Sonja of Norway.

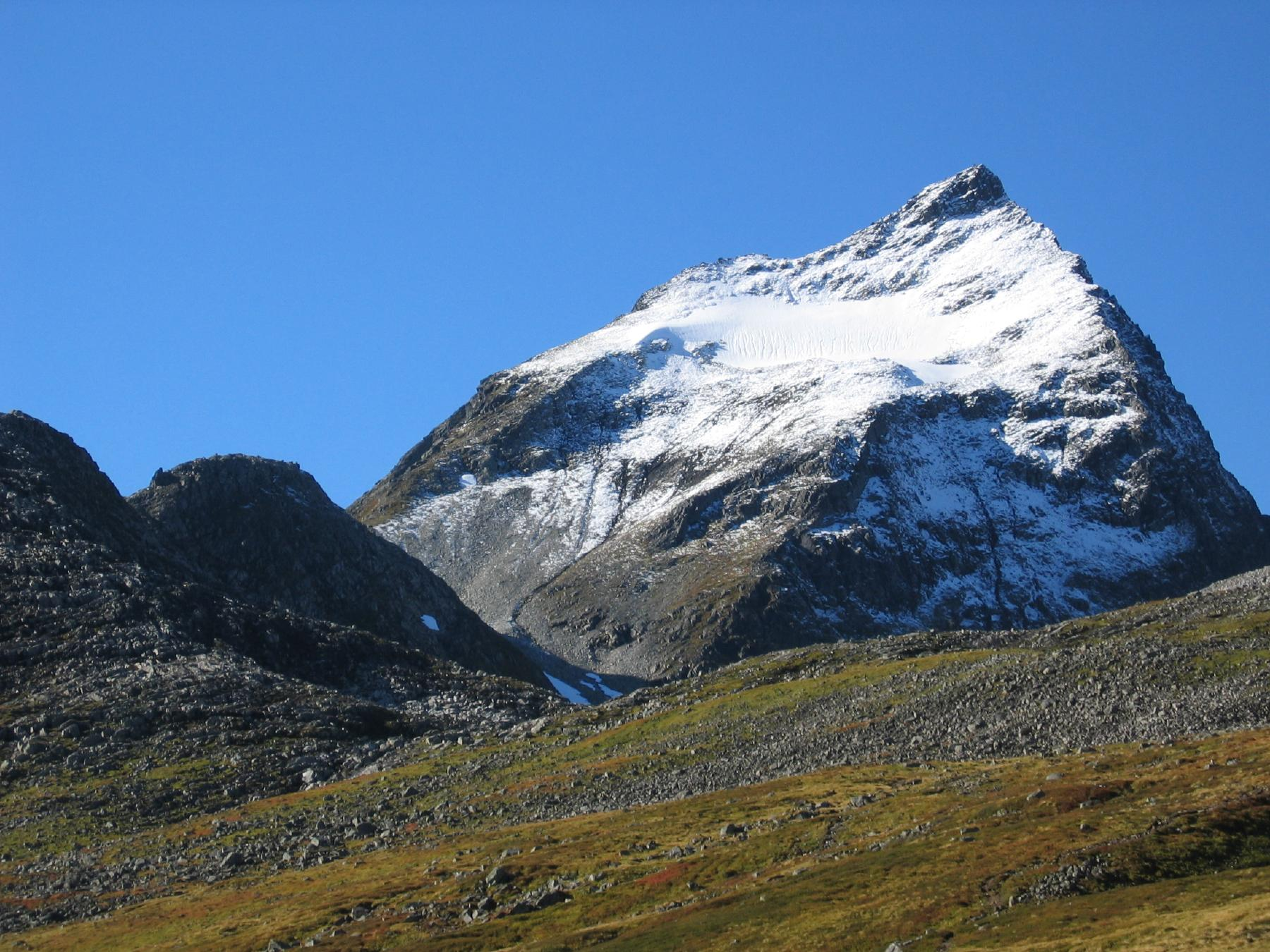
Slogen up close.

Even though it is not among the highest peaks in Norway, the 1,564-metre (5,131 ft) tall mountain is rated among the top ten mountain walks in Norway. This is largely due to its beauty, view, and the fact that it's rising directly from the fjord.

Legend has it that Slogen was first climbed in 1870 by Jon Klokk. Later on that year it was climbed by the famous climber and alpine explorer William Cecil Slingsby. The latter wrote about the view from Slogen as "one of the proudest in Europe".

== See also ==
- List of mountains of Norway
