= Gjermundnes Farm =

Historical farm

Coordinates: 62°37′26″N 07°09′59″E

The Gjermundnes Farm (Norwegian: Gjermundnes gård) is a Norwegian farm at Gjermundnes in Vestnes Municipality in Møre og Romsdal county. It is located along the Romsdalsfjord, just north of the village of Vikebukt.

The farm dates back to the Middle Ages and is a former large farm (storgård, in contrast to a småbruk 'small farm' or husmannsplass 'leased farm'). The farm was purchased by the former Romsdal County (Romsdalen amt) in 1898 and divided, and half of it became an agricultural school. The old farmhouse at the agricultural school is now the Møre og Romsdal Agricultural Museum, which was established in 1979.

Excavations have revealed Iron Age graves at the site, which have yielded various artifacts. the earliest finds at the site date to the Neolithic.
