= IKEA Museum =

Museum in Älmhult, Sweden

Coordinates: 56.5520°N 14.1346°E

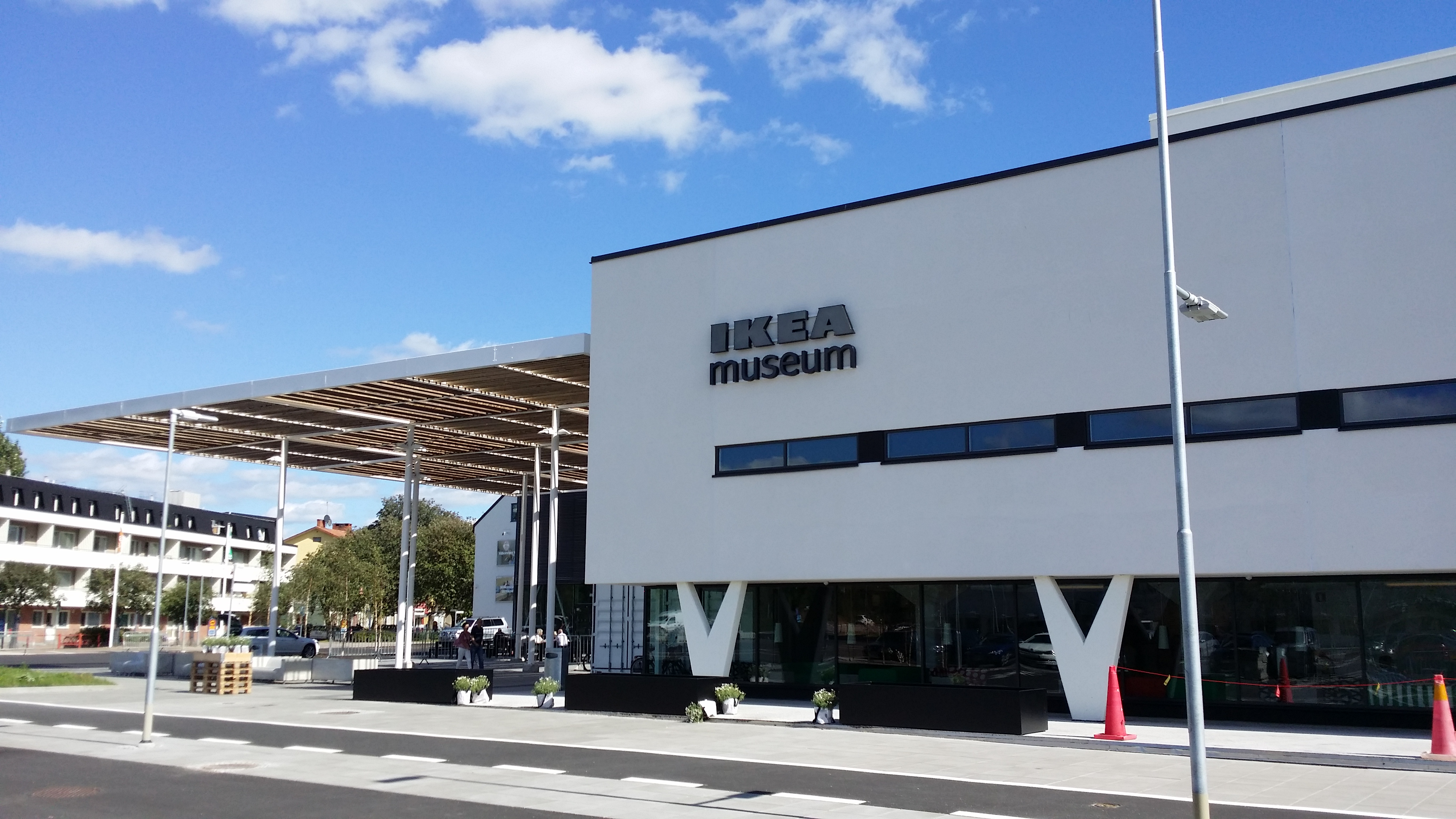
The IKEA Museum in August 2016

The IKEA Museum is a museum located in Älmhult, Sweden, that opened to the public on 30 June 2016. It presents the history of the furnishing company IKEA.

It replaced IKEA Through the Ages (located in the Corporate Culture Center 'Tillsammans'), a smaller 800 m^{2} exhibition that showed 20 different room settings with IKEA furniture and objects.

== Exhibits ==
The permanent exhibitions of the museum are divided into four main sections:

- Our Roots
- Democratic Design
- IKEA Through the Ages
- The Many Sides of Ingvar Kamprad

In addition, it hosts a number of temporary exhibitions.

The museum hosts its collections, including a complete archive of its catalogues digitally on its website.

== Building ==
The IKEA Museum is in the same building where the first IKEA store opened in 1958. The store moved to a new location in Älmhult in 2012. At this time, work began on converting the store into a museum, with an original planned opening date of 2015. The conversion of the store was overseen by companies Wilkinson Eyre and Ralph Appelbaum Associates, along with local architect Uulas Arkitekter. The facade of the building was restored to recreate its original appearance, and the roof was replaced with the addition of a roof lantern. The museum has an area of 3500 m^{2}. The museum also hosts a shop and restaurant, serving IKEA's famous meatballs.

The IKEA Hotell, which opened in 1964, is located across the street from the museum.

== The Museum of Furniture Studies ==
In 2024, IKEA bought the defunct The Museum of Furniture Studies that was located in Stockholm and moved it to Älmhult.
