= Imperial Furniture Collection =

Coordinates: 48°11′54.388″N 16°20′48.588″E

Imperial Furniture Collection (Hofmobiliendepot)
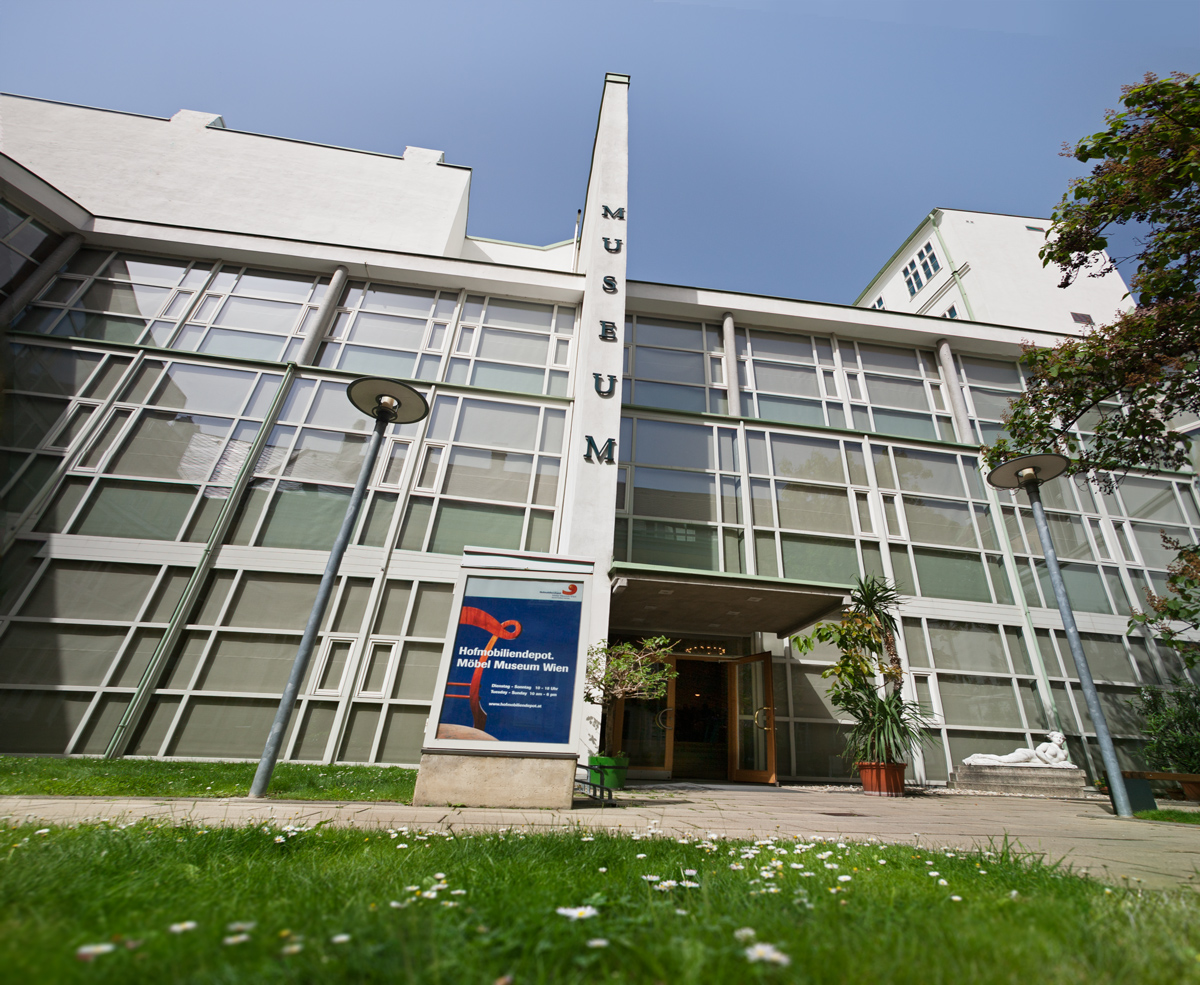
- The Imperial Furniture Collection in Vienna
- Established: 1747
- Location: Vienna, Austria
- Type: Furniture museum
- Owner: Bundesmuseen
- Website: www.Hofmobiliendepot.at

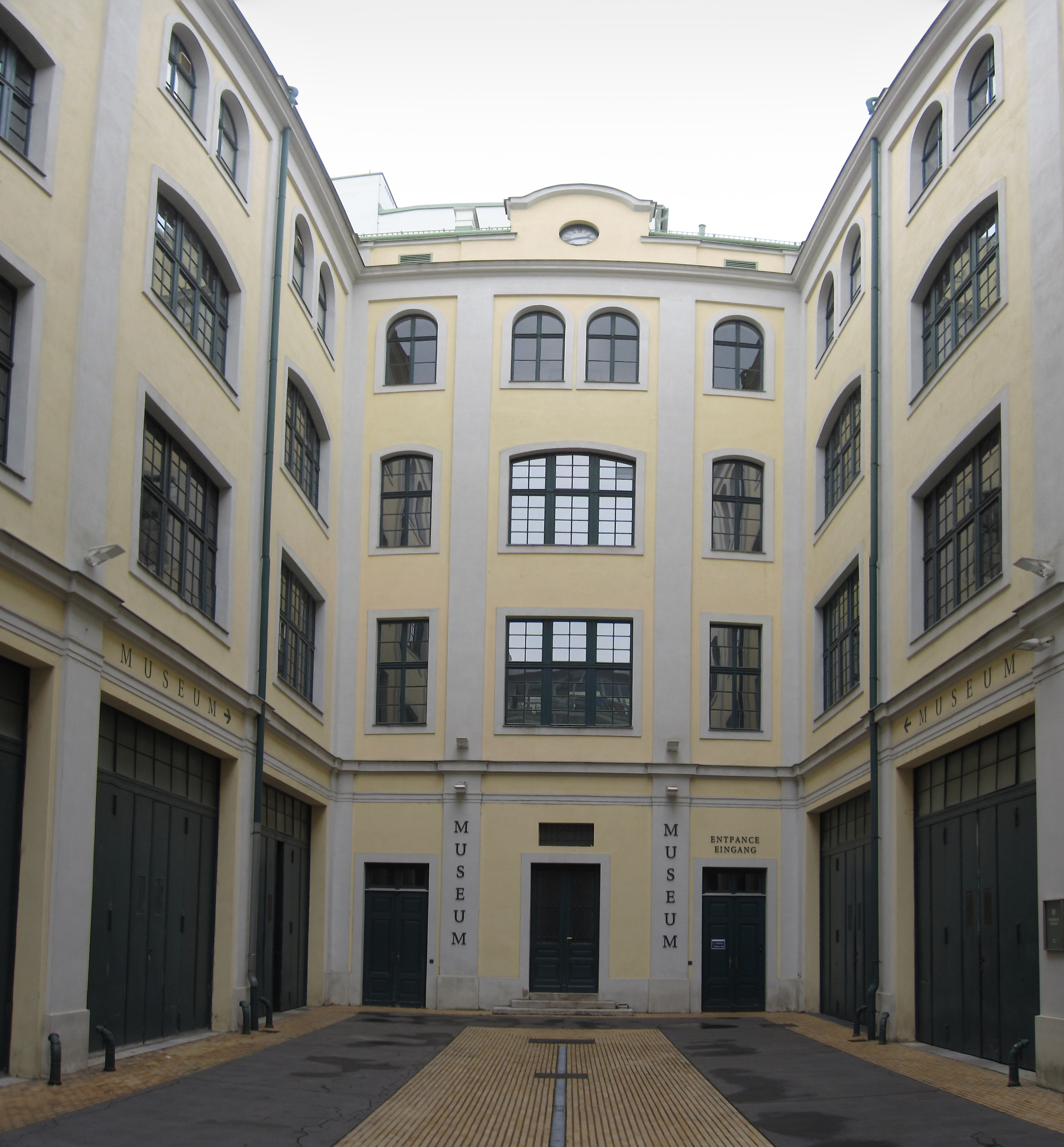
Entrance from the Mariahilferstrasse

The Imperial Furniture Collection (German: Hofmobiliendepot) in Vienna is a furniture museum that houses one of the most important collections of furniture in the world.

Today, the museum mainly contains furniture of the Habsburg monarchs. In addition the museum offers an overview of the history of Viennese cabinet making and interior decoration, from purveyors to the Imperial Household to well-known artists of the early 20th century, Adolf Loos, Josef Hoffmann and Otto Wagner, who characterized the domestic architecture of Vienna.

The main building is located in Andreasgasse 7 in the 7th Vienna district of Neubau.

== History ==
In 1747, the first Court Furniture Inspector (Hofmobilieninspektor) was entrusted with the inventory control, care and transportation of the furniture belonging to the imperial court of Empress Maria Theresa. In 1809 this court service was designated as the Court Furniture Directorate (Hofmobiliendirektion) and was responsible for the purchase of new furniture for the imperial household. In 1901 the present building of the Imperial-Royal Court Furniture Depository (k. k. Hofmobiliendepot) on Mariahilfer Straße 88, together with attached workshops and coach houses, was built as a central storage facility for furniture not actually being used. Because the Habsburgs furnished their residences and palaces in accordance with the style of the period and their own aesthetic taste, 160,000 items ended up in the exhibition. Anything that was no longer used, just made its way to the depot.

After the end of the Danube monarchy in 1919 the entire imperial furniture collection was transferred to the Republic of Austria. Part of it was, and is, used for representative purposes, for example for the official residences of the federal presidents.

== Collection ==
Today a large number of original items of furniture belonging to the Habsburgs may be seen in the museum, from commodes to imperial thrones. Even exhibits that appear strange today can be seen, such as the spittoons that were de rigueur a hundred years ago.

Austrian furniture designers and architects of the 20th century are also represented.

Organizationally, the Imperial Furniture Collection is part of the Schönbrunn Palace Cultural and Joint Operating Company (Schloss Schönbrunn Kultur- und Betriebsges.m.b.H.)

All federal government ministers may borrow furniture for their chancellery for the time of their period in office. Embassies draw on furniture from this depot and film companies also use original furniture for their films.

== See also ==
- Mobilier National of France

== Literature ==
- Eva B. Ottillinger (author), Lieselotte Hanzl: Kaiserliche Interieurs. Böhlau Verlag, Vienna, (2001). ISBN 3205986806
