= Jens Petter Ekornes =

Norwegian politician (1942–2008)

Jens Petter Ekornes (2 January 1942 – 22 June 2008) was a Norwegian businessperson, known as the CEO of Ekornes.

He was born in Ørsta Municipality as a son of Sigurd Ekornes (1906–) and Margit Helene Pedersen (1912–1983). In August 1963 he married saleswoman Kari Blakstad. His uncle Jens E. Ekornes founded the Ekornes furniture factory and company in Sykkylven. Jens Petter Ekornes started his career at the Ekornes factory as a laborer, and took education in Oslo. He rose in the hierarchy to become chief executive, except for a period between 1987 and 1990 when he tried to start ventures of his own in Ålesund.

Ekornes was a member of the central board of the Conservative Party until 2006. He served in Møre og Romsdal county council from 1999 to 2003 and was a deputy representative to the Parliament of Norway from Møre og Romsdal during the term 2001–2005. He has also been a board member of the Regional Development Fund.

He was decorated as a Knight, First Class of the Order of St. Olav in 2005, but wanted to share the honor with every one of his employees. He died in June 2008.
