= Mobilier National =

French government furniture collection

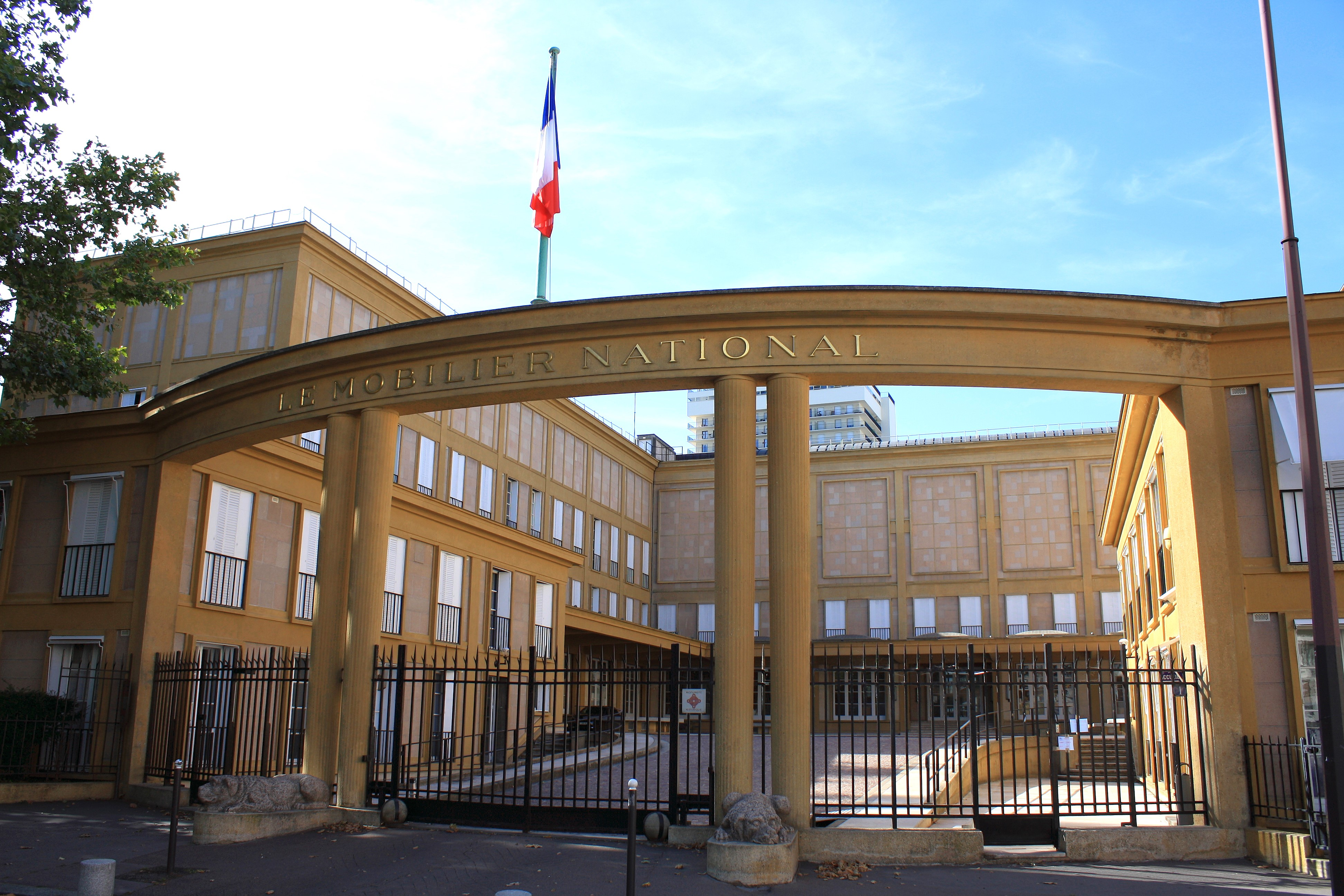
Headquarter of the Mobilier national

The Mobilier national is a French statutory corporation which administers the Gobelins Manufactory and Beauvais Manufactory. It is based in the 13th arrondissement of Paris, and falls under the supervision of the Ministry of Culture.

Its history goes back to the Garde-Meuble de la Couronne, which was responsible for the administration of all furniture and objects in the royal residences. The Mobilier national continues to administer state furniture but has also expanded from its historical role of conserving, preserving, and restoring furniture to curating a modern collection.

The director since February 2018, Hervé Lemoine, defended plans for September of 2020 to auction approximately 100 items off to aid French healthcare workers through the Foundation for Paris Hospitals and French Hospital, whose president is Brigitte Macron, during the pandemic, on the argument that they had little to no heritage value or associations to historic people. In support of artisans and creators during the pandemic, they additionally unveiled plans to commission new works and restoration projects. A special acquisitions committee was also suggested, that would buy plans and then make the ideas and projects of young creators. An exhibition in 2022 presented 185 objects from the 1930s to the 1960s.

Currently, the Mobilier national owns 130,000 items including tapestries, ceramics, chandeliers, and furniture.

== Research and Creation Workshop ==
The Research and Creation Workshop (Atelier de recherche et de création, ARC) is a team in charge of producing contemporary furniture for use by official buildings. It was created in 1964 on an initiative of the minister of cultural affairs, André Malraux. Among its most famous productions are the private apartments designed by Pierre Paulin for President Georges Pompidou at the palais de l'Élysée.

== See also ==
- Imperial Furniture Collection
