= Møre og Romsdal Agricultural Museum =

Museum in Norway

Coordinates: 62°37′26″N 07°09′59″E

The Møre og Romsdal Agricultural Museum (Norwegian: Landbruksmuseet for Møre og Romsdal) is part of the Sunnmøre Museum Foundation. It is located in Gjermundnes in Vestnes Municipality. The museum was originally a "large farm" (storgård, in contrast to a småbruk ["small farm"] or husmannsplass ["leased farm"]) and later on an agricultural school.

The former Romsdal County (Romsdalen amt) purchased the Gjermundnes Farm 1898. A new facility was built in 1908 to meet the special requirements for the newly established agricultural school. That building had become dilapidated by 1972, and it was decided to demolish it when new construction was completed. However, with financial support from the county executive board, the Norwegian Directorate for Cultural Heritage, and the municipality of Vestnes, the old facility was renovated and converted into an agricultural museum.

The Møre og Romsdal Agricultural Museum was officially opened on August 8, 1981 in conjunction with celebrations marking the centennial of the agricultural school, directed by the Møre og Romsdal agricultural company. In 2009 the museum became part of the Sunnmøre Museum Foundation.

The museum is located in a building from the old agricultural school. It is a natural stop between Ålesund and Åndalsnes, just south of Molde, with panoramic views of the Romsdal Fjord and Molde. The museum barn contains new exhibitions from 2013 presenting the hard life of a fjord farm in Møre og Romsdal a hundred years ago.

The area around the museum is located in a park with an avenue of oak trees dating from 1758, where there is also an Iron Age burial site. The exhibitions in the former dormitory cover the agricultural school's history at Gjermundnes, with student rooms restored to their conditions in 1960 and 1918.
