= Straumgjerde =

Village in Sykkylven Municipality, Norway

- Village
- Interactive map of Straumgjerde
- Location within Møre og Romsdal Location within Norway
- Coordinates: 62.3352°N 6.5936°E
- Country: Norway
- Region: Western Norway
- County: Møre og Romsdal
- District: Sunnmøre
- Municipality: Sykkylven Municipality

Area
  - Total: 0.47 km^{2} (0.18 sq mi)
- Elevation: 8 m (26 ft)

Population (2024)
  - Total: 428
  - Density: 911/km^{2} (2,360/sq mi)
- Time zone: UTC+01:00 (CET)
  - Summer (DST): UTC+02:00 (CEST)
- Post Code: 6220 Straumgjerde

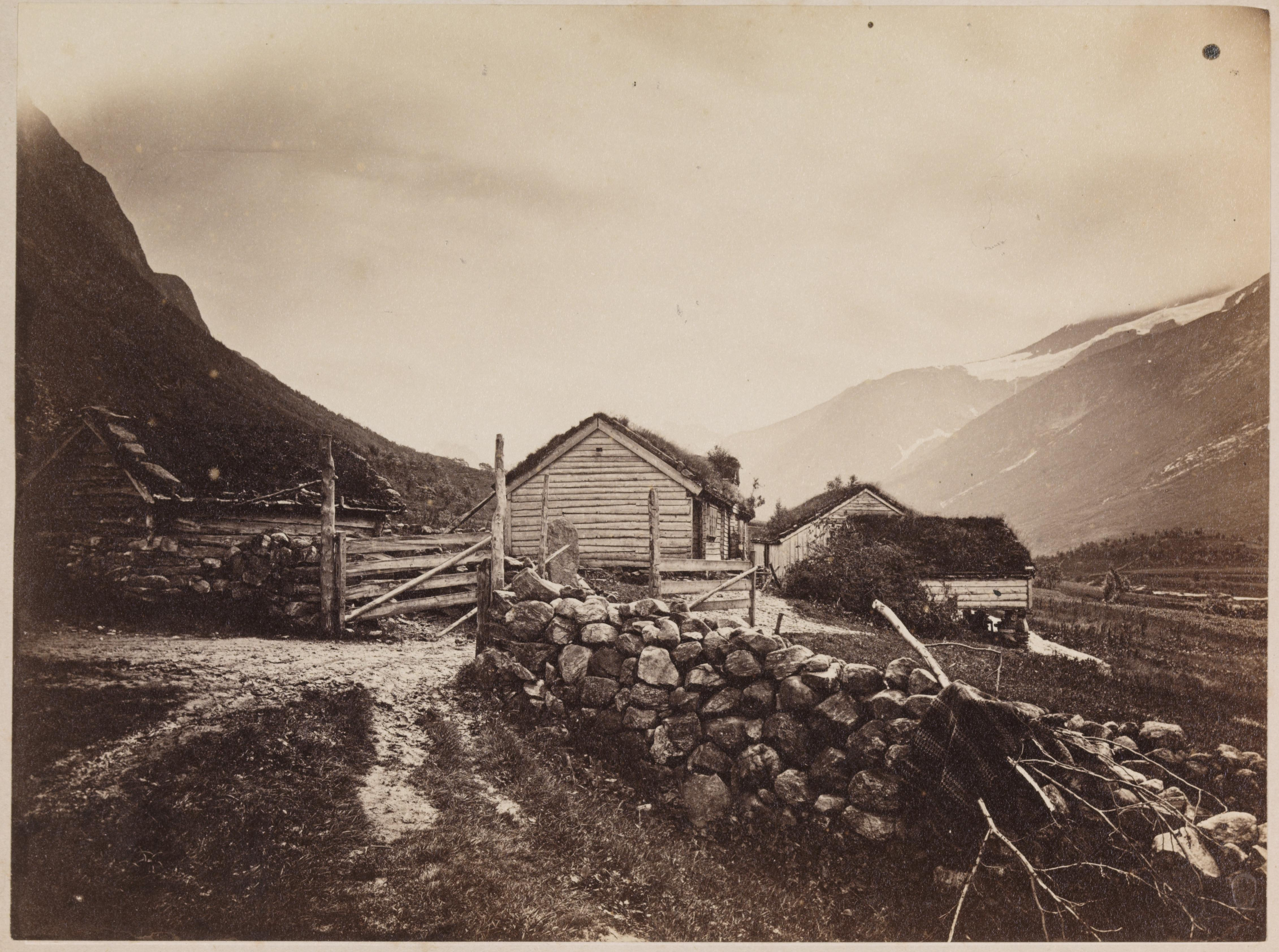

Straumgjerde is a village in Sykkylven Municipality in Møre og Romsdal county, Norway. The village is located where the lake Fitjavatnet empties into the Sykkylvsfjorden. It is about 6 kilometres (3.7 mi) south of the municipal center of Aure and about 11 kilometres (6.8 mi) south of Ikornnes. The mountain Råna lies 6 kilometres (3.7 mi) south of the village.

The 0.47-square-kilometre (120-acre) village has a population (2024) of 428 and a population density of 911 inhabitants per square kilometre (2,360/sq mi).
