= Brudavoll Farm =

Museum in Ørsta, Sunnmøre, Norway

Coordinates: 62°11′14.262″N 6°11′39.224″E

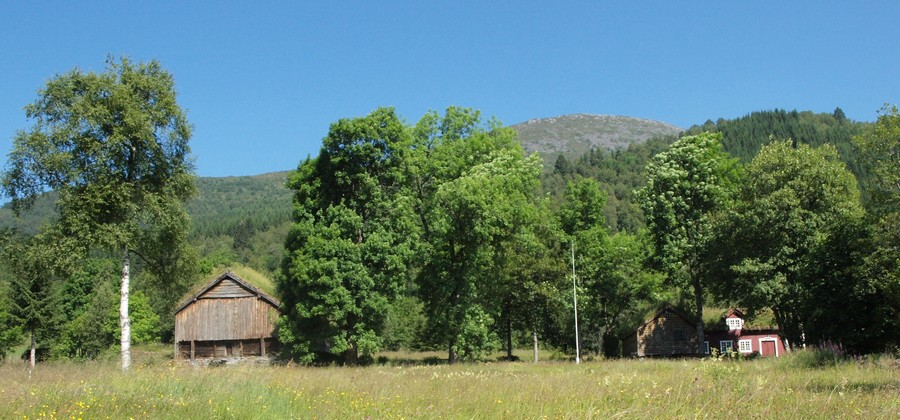
The Brudavoll Farm

The Brudavoll Farm (Norwegian: Brudavolltunet) is a museum in Ørsta Municipality in the Sunnmøre region of Western Norway. The museum is an old farm that was purchased for museum purposes in 1958. The farm is located about 5 kilometers (3.1 mi) from the center of Ørsta.

== History ==
The Brudavoll Farm has probably been inhabited since the 16th century. In the 17th century, the farm was struck by a landslide and the buildings were moved to a new location on the property. As far as is known, the farm was an isolated one. At that time, it was the farm with the largest open territory in Ørsta. In its configuration today, it is representative of an ordinary home in a rural fishing community in the 19th century. After the Ørsta Open Air Museum Society (Ørsta bygdemuseumslag) was established in 1951, it purchased part of the Brudavoll Farm in 1958: the buildings on the old farm and a small part of the land. The rest of the property was taken over by a new owner.

The Ørsta Open Air Museum Society was the owner and operator of the Brudavoll Farm until 2004, when ownership was assumed by the Brudavoll Farm Foundation (Stiftinga Brudavolltunet). The Brudavoll Farm is part of the Sunnmøre Museum Foundation.

== Buildings ==
The museum structures at the Brudavoll Farm include:

- A farmhouse with a loft
- A dower house with a freestanding kitchen
- A timber-framed barn with a stable. The barn has protected status.
- A storehouse
- A threshing house with a waterwheel and stone water channel
- A smithy; this was moved to the Brudavoll Farm from Digernes in Ørsta.

In the middle of the farm there is a large flat rock that was used as a garden table and workplace. The garden at the farm was probably laid out in the 1830s.

== Gallery ==
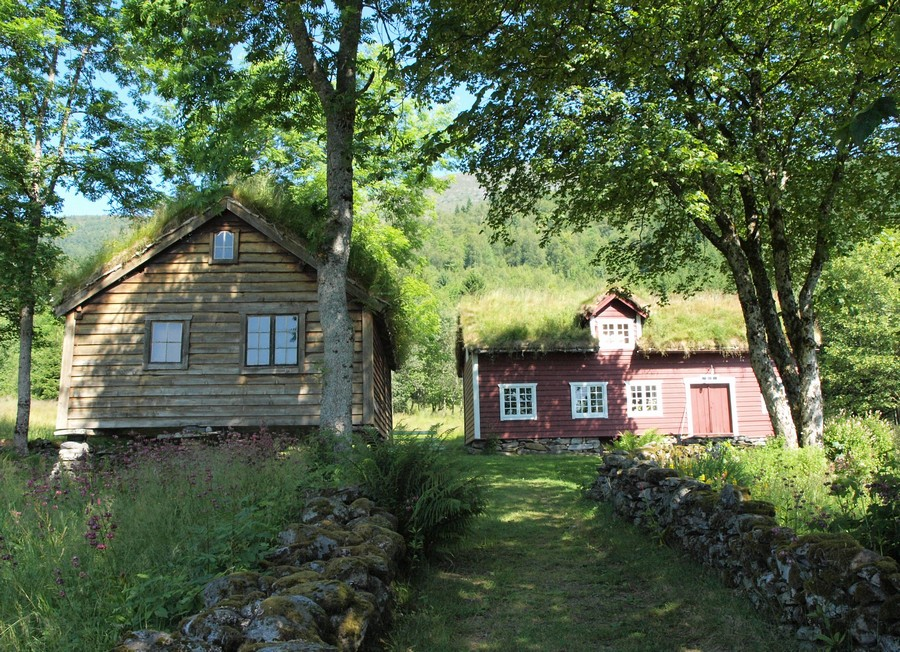
Farmhouse and storehouse

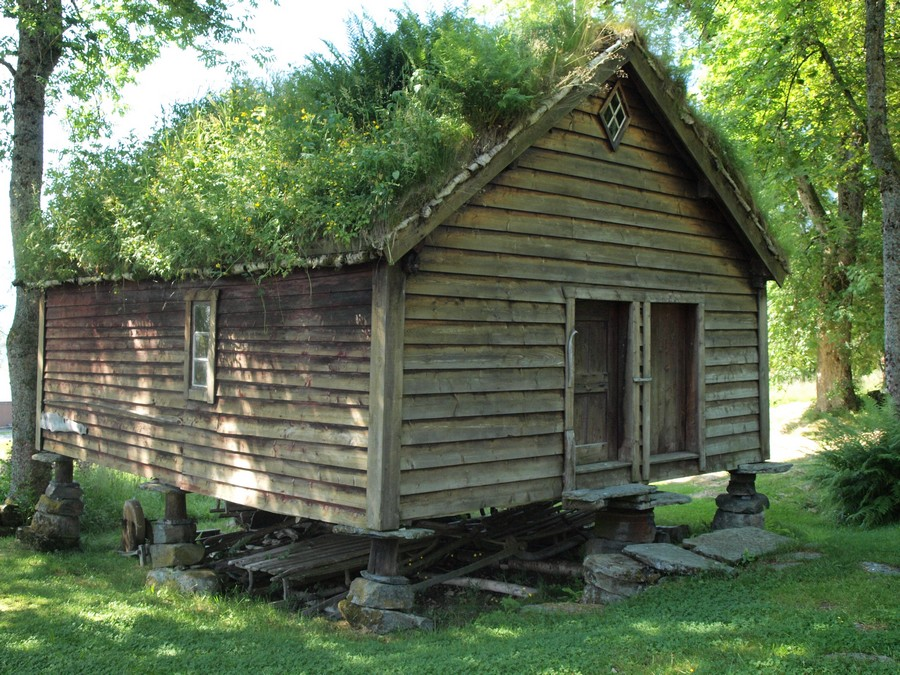
Storehouse

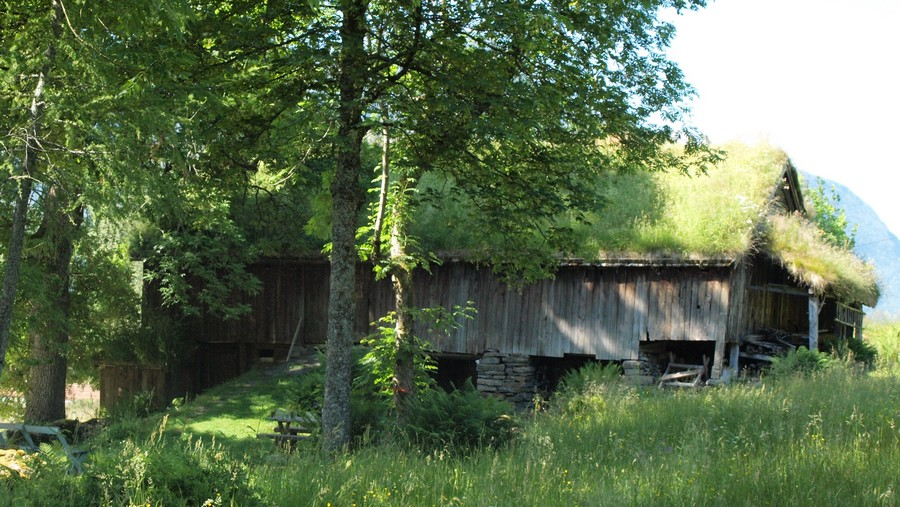
Barn

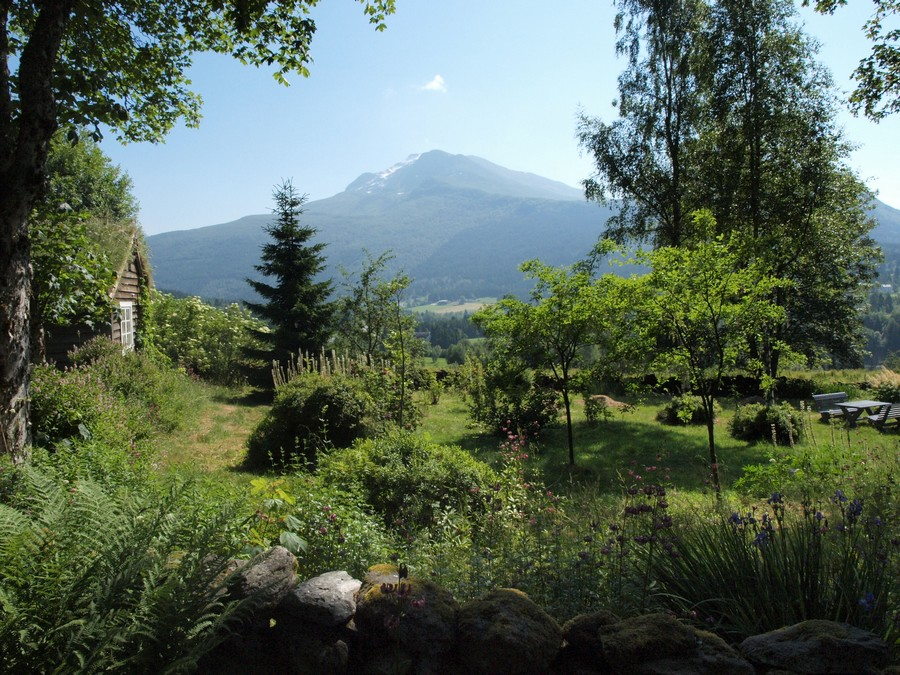
Old garden
