= Sykkylvsfjorden =

Fjord in Møre og Romsdal, Norway

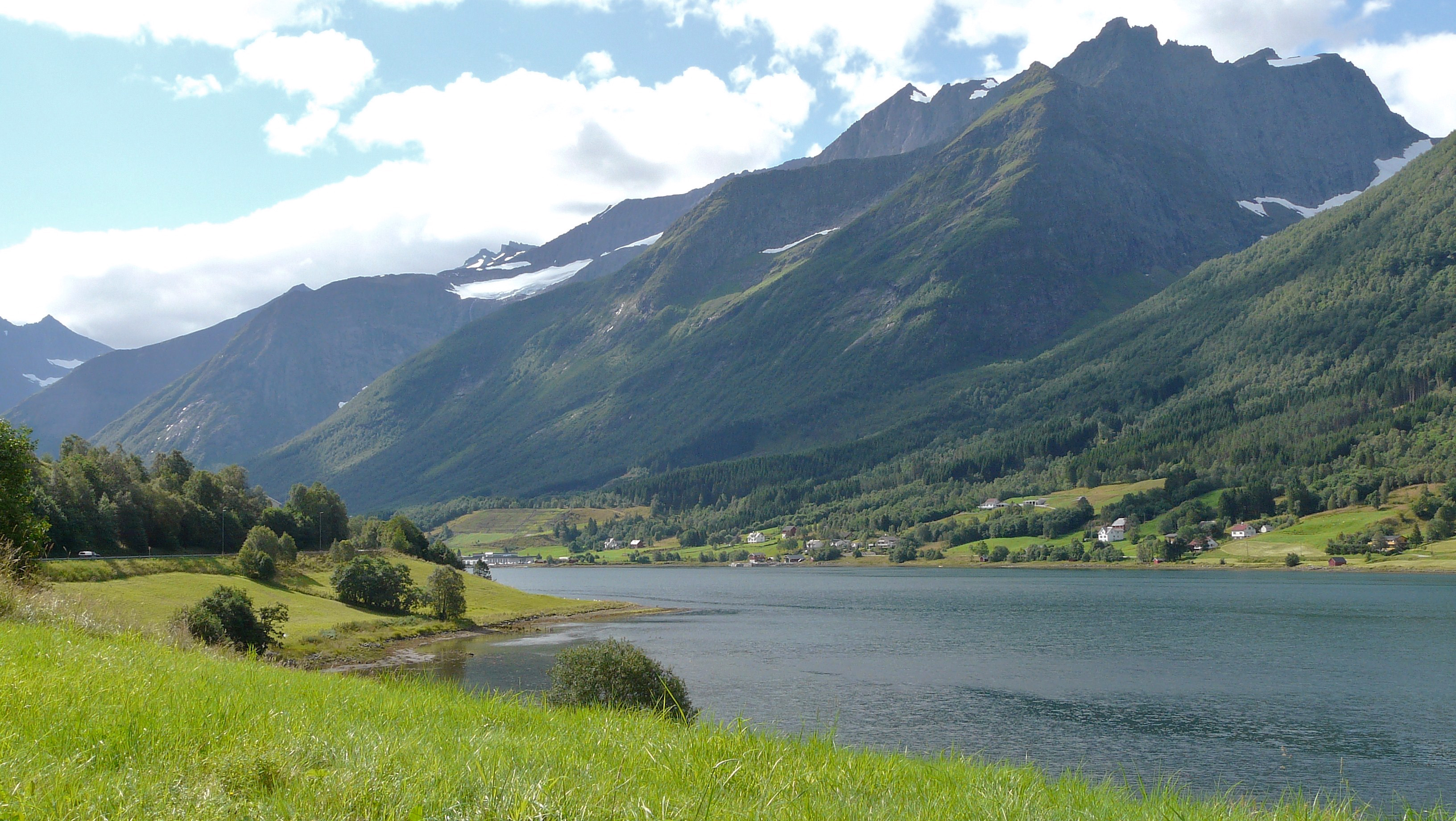
- View of the Sykkylvsfjorden and mountains Credit: Simo Räsänen
- Interactive map of the fjord
- Location: Møre og Romsdal county, Norway
- Coordinates: 62.3695°N 6.5575°E
- Type: Fjord
- Primary outflows: Storfjorden
- Basin countries: Norway
- Max. length: 10 kilometres (6.2 mi)
- Max. width: 2 kilometres (1.2 mi)
- Max. depth: 247 metres (810 ft)
- Settlements: Aure, Ikornnes, Straumgjerde

Sykkylvsfjorden is a fjord in Sykkylven Municipality in Møre og Romsdal county, Norway. The fjord is a branch off of the main Storfjorden.

The villages of Aure and Ikornnes are located near the mouth of the fjord and the village of Straumgjerde lies at the innermost part of the fjord. The Sykkylven Bridge crosses the fjord between Aure and Ikornnes. Ikorness is home to Ekornes sofas and Stressless recliners, the largest manufacturers of furniture in Scandinavia.

The deepest point in the fjord is 247 metres (810 ft) below sea level, near where it joins the Storfjorden. The 10-kilometre (6.2 mi) long fjord is mostly less than 1 kilometre (0.62 mi) wide (except for the area around the mouth of the fjord), with the narrowest point being only 200 metres (660 ft) wide.

== See also ==
- List of Norwegian fjords
