= Jens E. Ekornes =

Norwegian businessman (1908–1976)

Jens Ellingsen Ekornes (20 January 1908 – 28 November 1976) was a Norwegian businessperson. He was the founder of Norwegian-based furniture company, Ekornes AS.

== Biography ==
Ekornes was born at Sykkylven Municipality in Møre og Romsdal, Norway. He was the son of Elling Sivertsen Ekornes (1878–1966) and Berte Jensine Jensdatter Vik (1884–1968). Jens Ekornes was the second of five brothers: Sigurd b. 1906, Jens b. 1908, Martin b. 1912, Leiv Peder b. 1917.

Stressless Logo

In his early twenties, he went to work for Ørsta Lenestolfabrikk where his brother, Sigurd Ekornes, was co-owner. In 1934, he founded the furniture company J. E. Ekornes Fjærfabrikk in Sykkylven. In 1937 he took a trip to England, France and Germany. He also visited the United States several times, to learn his trade. Initially the firm was principally focused on the production of mattress. In 1966, Ekornes started production of lounge furniture. In 1971, Stressless chairs were introduced on the Norwegian market.

Jens E. Ekornes was the sole owner of the company until 1960, when his brothers Leif and Martin became co-owners in a joint stock company J. E. Ekornes Fabrikker AS. Upon his death in 1976, Martin Ekornes took over as chief executive. Later, his nephew Jens Petter Ekornes (1942–2008) became CEO of Ekornes until 1987.

== Personal life ==
In 1933, he married Petrine Elida Tomasdatter Riksheim. In 1971 he was appointed a knight of the 1st class of the Order of St. Olav. Ekornes died in 1976.

== Related reading ==
- Høidal, Eldar (2009) Fra springfjær til Stressless (Ekornes ASA) ISBN 9788230314579
