= Gjermundnes =

Hamlet in Vestnes Municipality, Norway

- Hamlet
- Interactive map of Gjermundnes
- Location within Møre og Romsdal Location within Norway
- Coordinates: 62.6304°N 7.16748°E
- Country: Norway
- Region: Western Norway
- County: Møre og Romsdal
- District: Romsdal
- Municipality: Vestnes Municipality
- Elevation: 6 m (20 ft)
- Time zone: UTC+01:00 (CET)
  - Summer (DST): UTC+02:00 (CEST)
- Post Code: 6392 Vikebukt

Gjermundnes is a hamlet on the east side of the mouth of Tres Fjord in Vestnes Municipality in Møre og Romsdal county, Norway. It lies a short distance to the northeast of the village of Vikebukt. Gjermundnes is also the name of the peninsula where the hamlet is located.

The village includes the historic Gjermundnes Farm and an agricultural school, which is the only agricultural school in Møre og Romsdal county. It is also the location of the Møre og Romsdal Agricultural Museum.

== Landslide ==
Just before 8:00 pm on February 22, 1756, a landslide with a volume of 12,000,000 to 15,000,000 cubic metres (16,000,000 to 20,000,000 cubic yards) — the largest known landslide in Norway in historic time — traveled at high speed from a height of 400 metres (1,312 ft) on the side of the mountain Tjellafjellet into the Langfjorden 40 kilometres (25 mi) from Gjermundnes. The slide generated three megatsunamis in the immediate area in the Langfjorden and the Eresfjorden with heights of 40 to 50 metres (131 to 164 ft). Damaging waves, although reduced in size, reached Gjermundnes.
