= Älmhult =

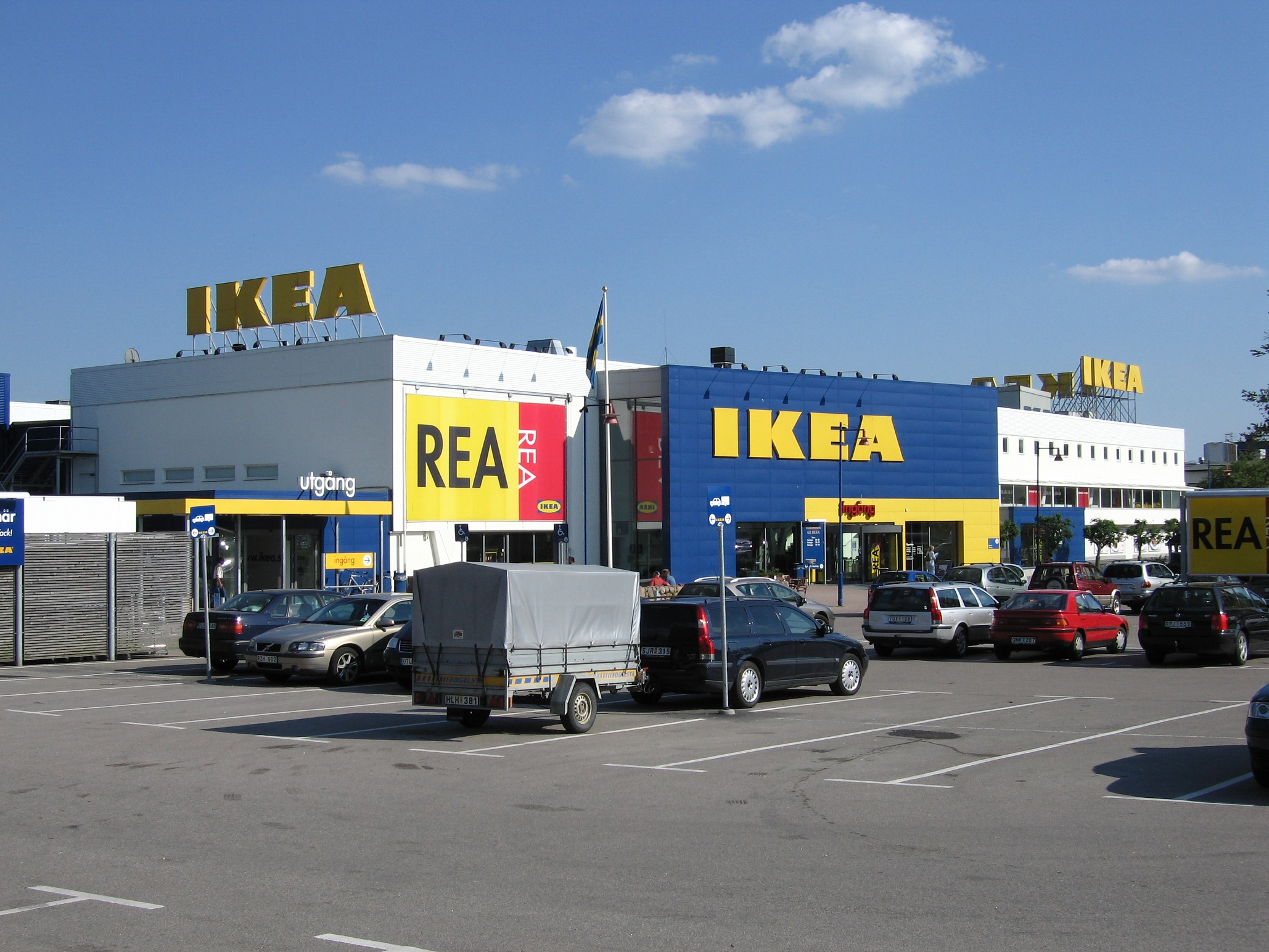
- The original IKEA store in Älmhult. This store is now the IKEA Museum.

- Coat of arms

- Location within Kronoberg Location within Sweden
- Coordinates: 56°33′N 14°08′E
- Country: Sweden
- Province: Småland
- County: Kronoberg County
- Municipality: Älmhult Municipality

Area
  - Total: 8.78 km^{2} (3.39 sq mi)

Population (2020)
  - Total: 11,003
  - Density: 1,020/km^{2} (2,600/sq mi)
- Time zone: UTC+1 (CET)
  - Summer (DST): UTC+2 (CEST)

Älmhult (Swedish pronunciation: [ˈɛ̂lmhɵlt]) is a locality and the seat of Älmhult Municipality in Kronoberg County, Sweden, with a population of 17,950 as of 2024.

It was in Älmhult that the first IKEA store was built. IKEA continues to have a large corporate presence there. A museum of IKEA's history, the IKEA Museum, opened in the town on 30 June 2016. It was constructed to present the history of IKEA.

Älmhult has a local gymnasium called Haganässkolan and an international school that goes up to Year 10. Haganässkolan is an International Baccalaureate-authorized school that offers the IB Diploma Programme since August 2017.

== Museums ==
- The Museum of Furniture Studies
