= Råna =

Mountain in Møre og Romsdal, Norway

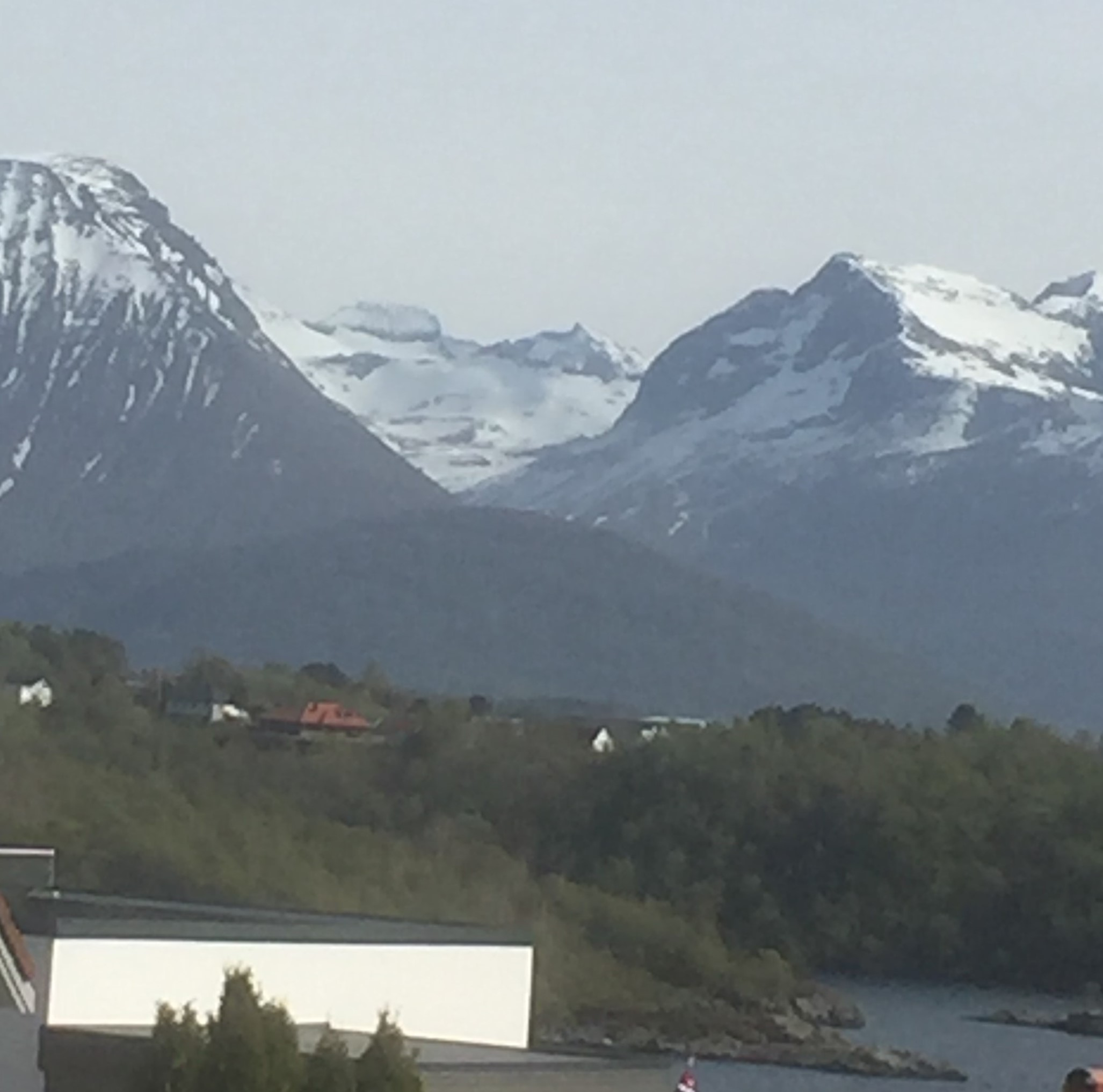

Highest point
- Elevation: 1,586 m (5,203 ft)
- Prominence: 770 m (2,530 ft)
- Parent peak: Smorskredtindane
- Isolation: 11.7 km (7.3 mi)
- Coordinates: 62°16′31″N 6°34′28″E

Geography
- Interactive map of the mountain
- Location: Møre og Romsdal, Norway
- Parent range: Sunnmørsalpene
- Topo map(s): 1219 IV Sykkylven and 1219 III Hjørundfjord

Råna is a mountain in Møre og Romsdal county, Norway. The mountain sits on the municipal border between Ørsta Municipality and Sykkylven Municipality. It is part of Hjelledalstindane mountains in the Sunnmørsalpene range. The 1,586-metre (5,203 ft) tall mountain is located about 8 kilometres (5.0 mi) east of the village of Store-Standal in Ørsta Municipality and about 7 kilometres (4.3 mi) south of the village of Straumgjerde in Sykkylven Municipality.

== See also ==
- List of mountains of Norway
