= The Museum of Furniture Studies =

- Möbeldesignmuseum
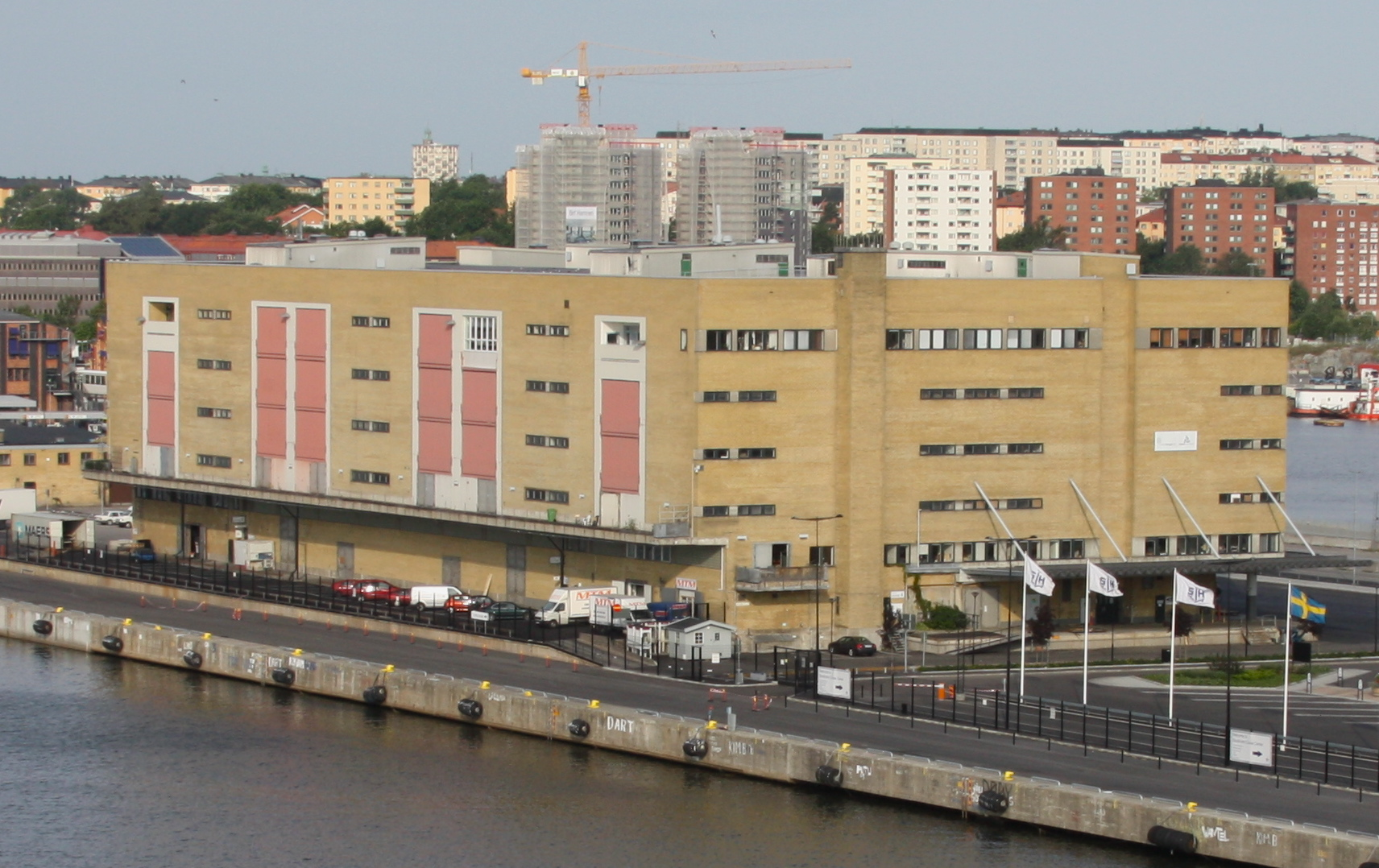
- Building that housed the museum in Stockholm
- Established: 2017 or 2018; Relocated to Älmhult in 2024
- Location: Älmhult, Sweden
- Coordinates: 56°33′8″N 14°8′4″E
- Type: Furniture museum
- Founders: Kersti Sandin Bülow & Lars Bülow
- Website: mobeldesignmuseum.se

The Museum of Furniture Studies (Swedish: Möbeldesignmuseum) is a museum of furniture design located in Älmhult, Sweden. It has more than 1200 pieces in its collection.

== History ==
The museum was founded in 2017 or 2018 in Frihamnen area of Stockholm by Kersti Sandin Bülow & Lars Bülow.

In 2022, the museum permanently closed, but two years later IKEA bought the museum and moved it to Älmhult.
