= Ekornes =

Ekornes is a surname. Notable people with the surname include:

- Jens E. Ekornes (1908–1976), Norwegian businessman
- Jens Petter Ekornes (1942–2008), Norwegian businessman, nephew of Jens
- Kenneth Ekornes (born 1974), Norwegian jazz musician
