= Sykkylven Church =

Church in Møre og Romsdal, Norway

- Sykkylven kyrkje
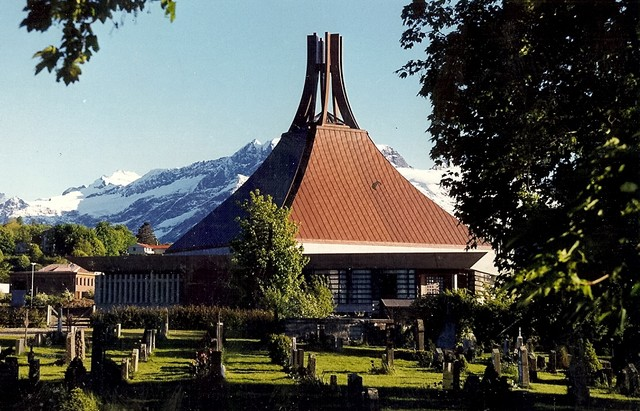
- View of the church
- Sykkylven Church
- 62°23′37″N 6°34′54″E
- Location: Sykkylven Municipality, Møre og Romsdal
- Country: Norway
- Denomination: Church of Norway
- Churchmanship: Evangelical Lutheran

History
- Status: Parish church
- Founded: c. 1325
- Consecrated: 15 April 1990
- Events: Fire: 1983

Architecture
- Functional status: Active
- Architect: Oskar Norderval
- Architectural type: Long church
- Completed: 1990 (36 years ago)

Specifications
- Capacity: 850
- Materials: Brick

Administration
- Diocese: Møre bispedømme
- Deanery: Nordre Sunnmøre prosti
- Parish: Sykkylven
- Norwegian Cultural Heritage Site
- Type: Church
- Status: Not protected
- ID: 226938

Sykkylven Church (Norwegian: Sykkylven kyrkje) is a parish church of the Church of Norway in Sykkylven Municipality in Møre og Romsdal county, Norway. It is located in the village of Aure. It is the church for the Sykkylven parish which is part of the Nordre Sunnmøre prosti (deanery) in the Diocese of Møre. The red brick church was built in a long church design in 1990 using plans drawn up by the architect Oskar Norderval. The church seats about 850 people.

== History ==
The earliest existing historical records of the church date back to 1416, but the church was not new that year. The first church here was a wooden stave church that was likely built around the year 1325. (Before this time, there may have been a small farm chapel on the site from the year 1100 until the early 1300s.) The church was located about 100 metres (330 ft) north of the present church site. In 1705, the old stave church was struck by lightning and it burned to the ground. A new timber-framed cruciform building was built on the same site to replace the older building that burned.

A new church was built just to the south of the old one in early 1883. The church was designed by Johan Digre. Work on the new church began in early 1882 and it was completed in 1883. The new building was consecrated on 10 July 1883. It was a relatively large wooden long church with tar-covered exterior siding. In the fall of 1883, the old church was torn down. The interior of the building was renovated and redecorated significantly in the 1930s and 1940s. In 1968–1969, the church was renovated and expanded. The church was extended further to the west so that it could accommodate nearly 1,000 people inside. The exterior was painted white after the renovation. The church was re-consecrated on 17 August 1969.

On 2 February 1983, the 100-year-old church burned down. Many years passed before a new church was constructed. In 1990, the new church was finally completed. It was built about 100 metres (330 ft) to the south of the old church site, just outside of the church cemetery. The church was designed by Oskar Norderval and it is a much more modern building that the previous ones, particularly the roof. The new church was consecrated on 15 April 1990 by the Bishop Ole Nordhaug.

== Media gallery ==
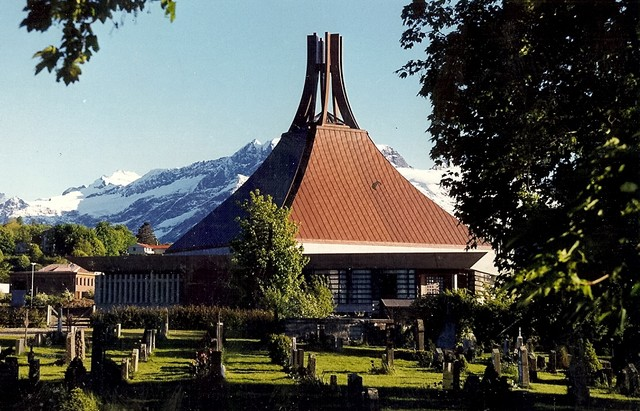
Present church

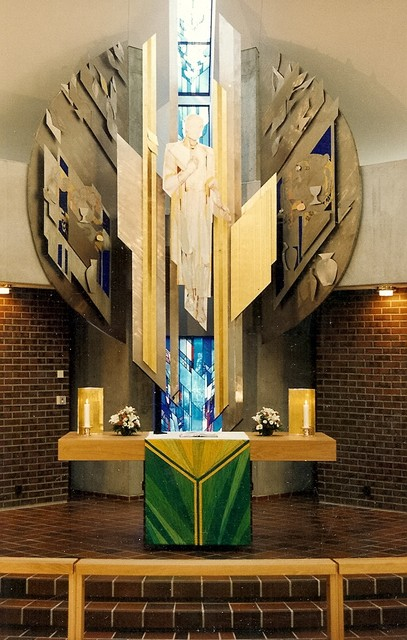
Altar

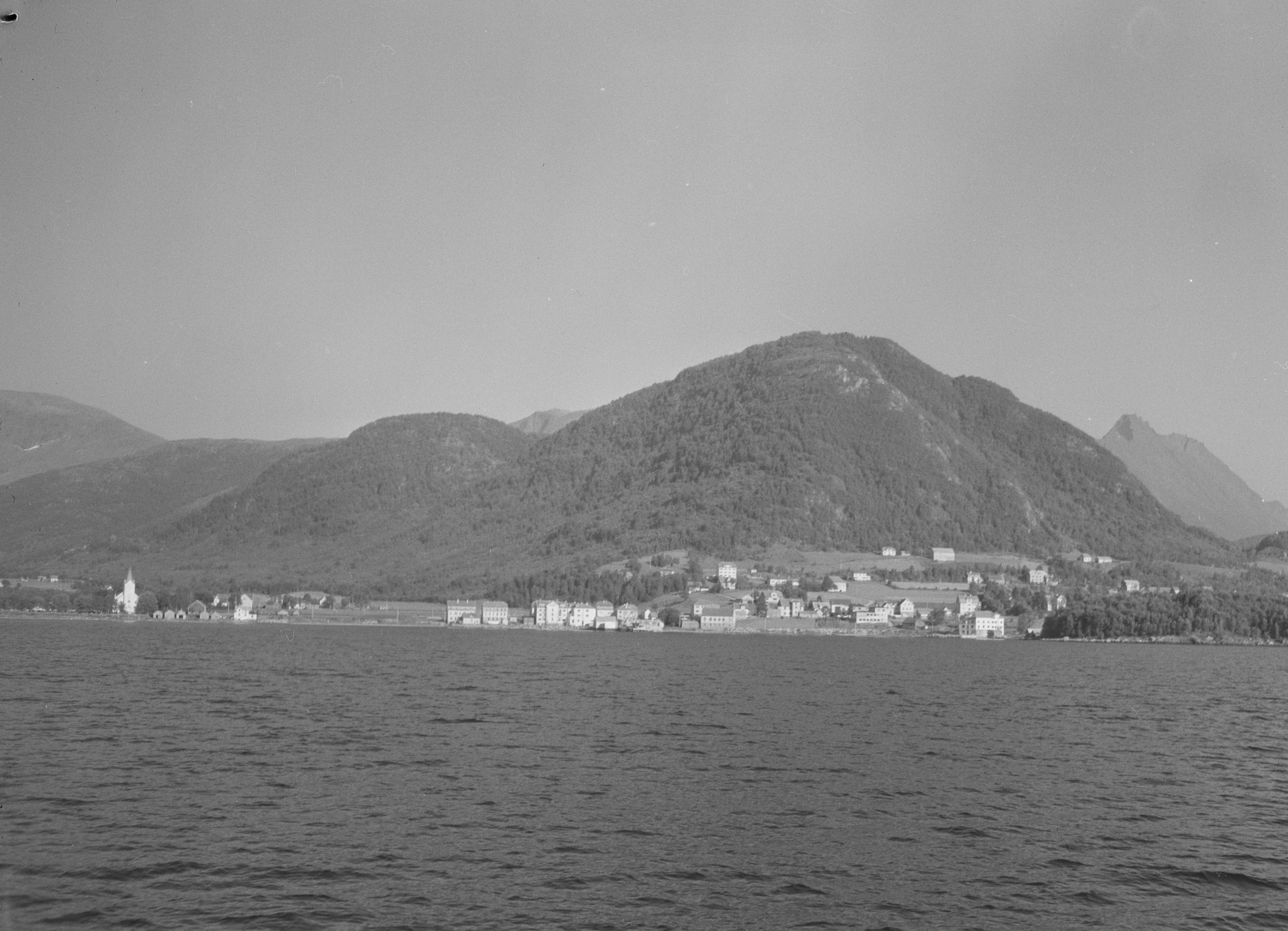
View of the old church (1883-1983)

== See also ==
- List of churches in Møre
