= Louis Vouland Museum =

French museum in Avignon

Coordinates: 43°56′50″N 4°48′02″E

The Louis Vouland Museum (musée Louis Vouland) is a 17th and 18th century decorative arts museum in Avignon, housed in a hôtel particulier designed by Villeneuve-Esclapon. Its collections include Parisian furniture, faience from Marseille and Moustiers, metalwork, tapestries and paintings.

== History ==
On 26 November 1872 at Hyères, Mathilde de Thysebaërt married Marie Xavier Arthur de Villeneuve-Esclapon, who in 1877 became secretary-general for the department of Vaucluse. In 1879 Mathilde bought an estate next to the rue Saint-Dominique (now the rue Victor-Hugo) in Avignon, where she built a hôtel particulier. The couple lived there for a time before selling it to Marie Camp in 1897. After Camp's death it was bought on 14 November 1927 by the industrialist and collector Louis Vouland to house his collections. On his death on 28 November 1973, he left the building and his collections to the Fondation de France to become a museum.

== Collections ==
=== Ceramics ===
==== French faience ====
===== Other =====
The museum also exhibits faience from outside Provence, such as that made in Niderviller, Strasbourg, Lyon and Montpellier.

== Selected exhibitions ==
- 25 June - 30 October 2011 : « La collection Dumon », Fondation Regards de Provence
- 23 June - 28 October 2012 : « SPH (Société protectrice de l'humour), 10 ans d'expositions de dessins d'humour en Avignon de 1967 à 1976 »
- summer 2013 : « Lumières », Régis Mathieu and his 'Galerie Lumières'
- 28 June - 26 October : « Rêves d'un collectionneur »
- 18 June – 6 September 2015 : « Jean-Henri Fabre (1823-1915), l’art dans la nature »
- 2 June – 2 October 2016 : « Victor Vasarely, Multiplicité »
- 2 June – 1 October 2017 : « Hortus 2.0, acte 1 », EDIS (commissaire d’exposition)
- 1 December 2017 – 13 May 2018 : « Promenade dans la lumière de Vaucluse »
- 3 July – 4 November 2018 : « Le temps suspendu »
- 21 February – 9 June 2019 : « Yuan Chin-Taa, l’art est un jeu »

== Bibliography ==
- Musée Louis Vouland, Avignon, fondation Louis Vouland, 2014, 120 p. (ISBN 978-2-913006-13-3)
