= Aure, Sykkylven =

Village in Sykkylven Municipality, Norway

Aure Sykkylven
- Village
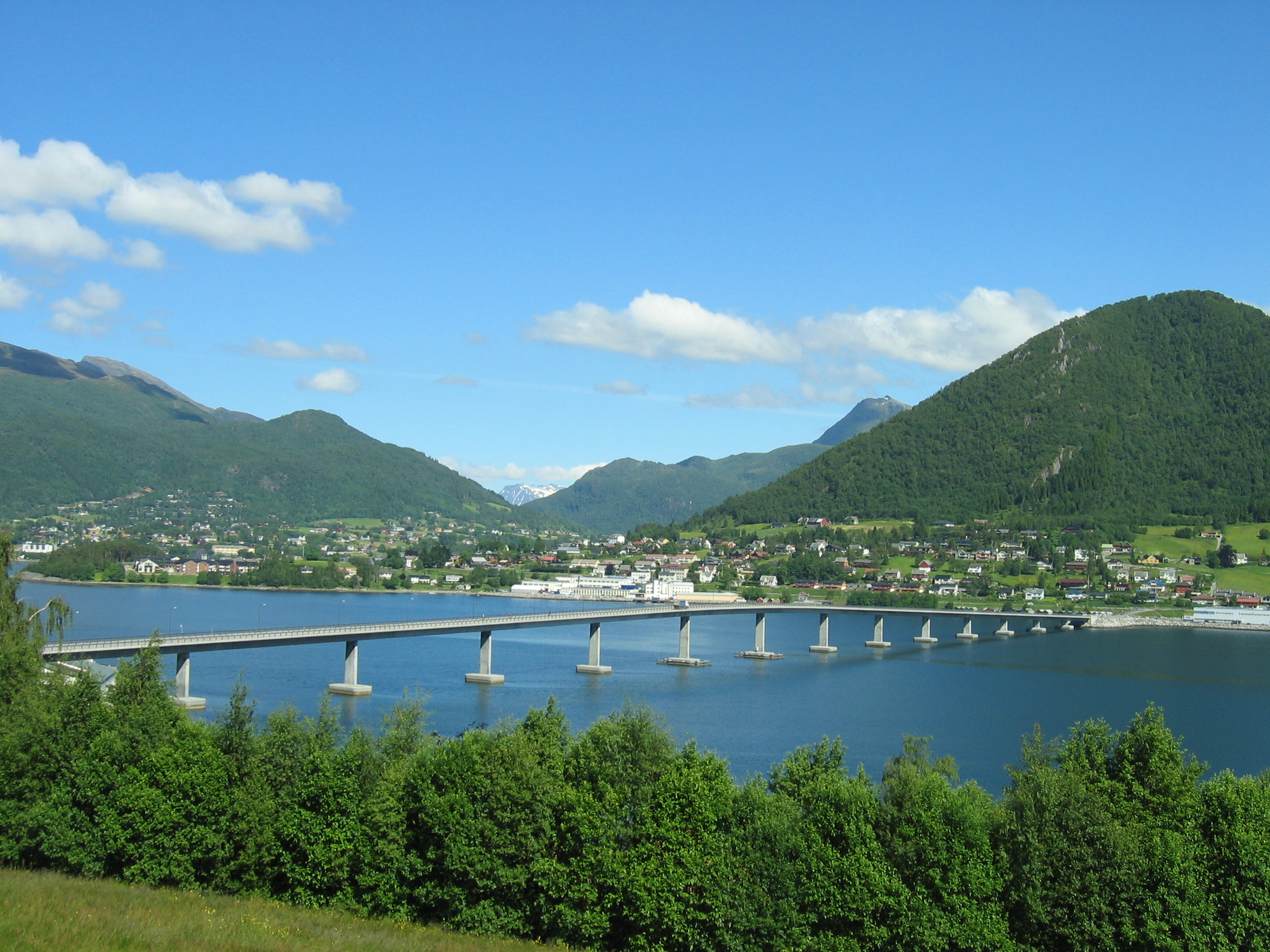
- Interactive map of Aure; Sykkylven
- Location within Møre og Romsdal Location within Norway
- Coordinates: 62.3914°N 6.5795°E
- Country: Norway
- Region: Western Norway
- County: Møre og Romsdal
- District: Sunnmøre
- Municipality: Sykkylven Municipality

Area
  - Total: 3.57 km^{2} (1.38 sq mi)
- Elevation: 8 m (26 ft)

Population (2024)
  - Total: 4,452
  - Density: 1,247/km^{2} (3,230/sq mi)
- Time zone: UTC+01:00 (CET)
  - Summer (DST): UTC+02:00 (CEST)
- Post Code: 6230 Sykkylven

Aure or Sykkylven is the administrative center of Sykkylven Municipality in Møre og Romsdal county, Norway. The village is located along the eastern shore of the Sykkylvsfjorden. It is about 7 kilometres (4.3 mi) north of Straumgjerde and 3 kilometres (1.9 mi) east of Ikornnes (via the Sykkylven Bridge).

The 3.57-square-kilometre (880-acre) village has a population (2024) of 4,452 and a population density of 1,247 inhabitants per square kilometre (3,230/sq mi). It's the largest urban area in the municipality.

Sykkylven Church is located in this village. The village is home to various types of industry, especially furniture building, woodworking, and mechanical engineering. The Furniture Museum, part of the Sunnmøre Museum Foundation, is located in Aure.
