= Sykkylven Municipality =

Municipality in Møre og Romsdal, Norway

Sykkylven Municipality Sykkylven kommune
- Municipality
- Søkkelven herred (historic name); Søkelven herred (historic name)
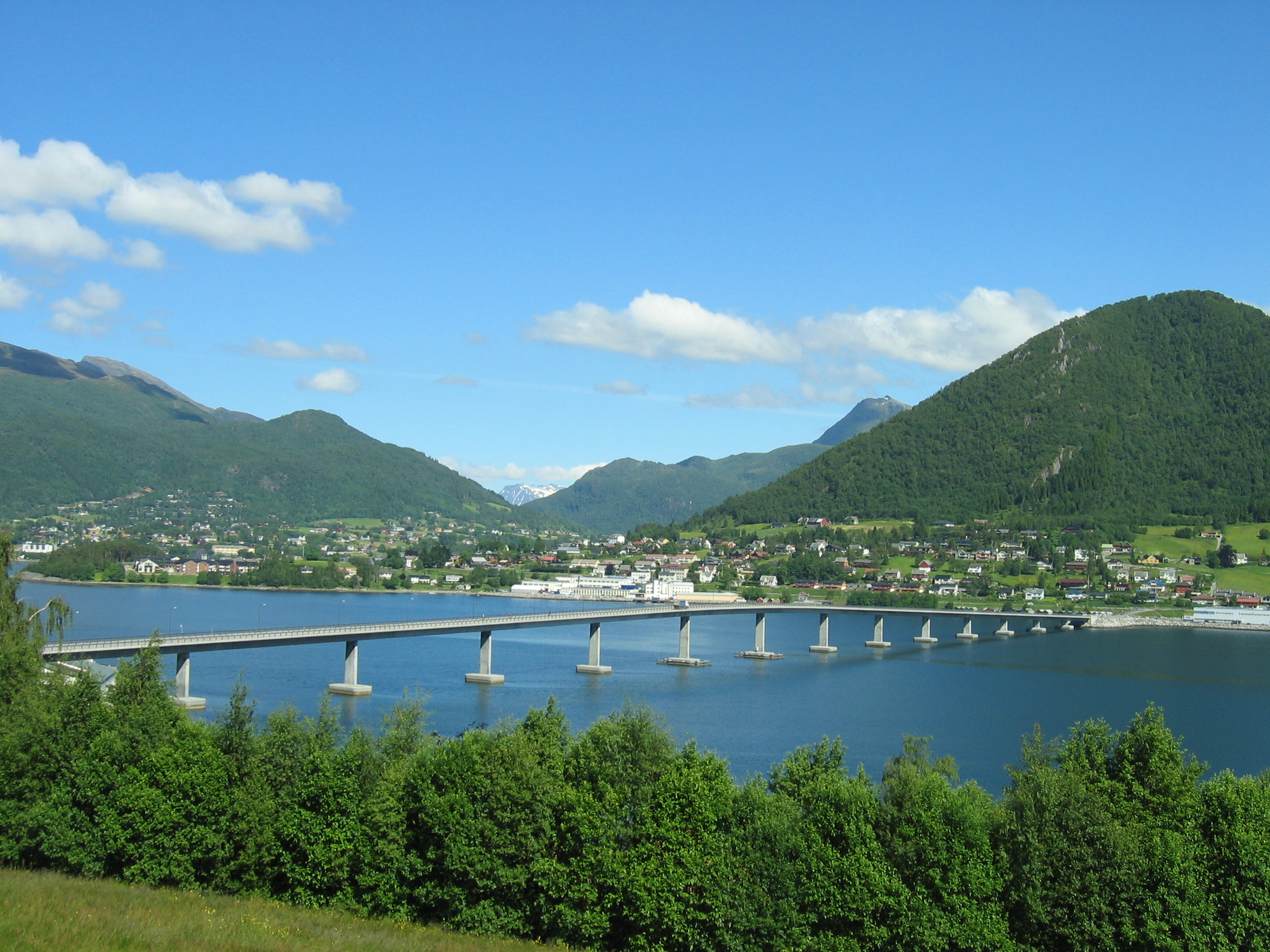
- View of the Sykkylven Bridge

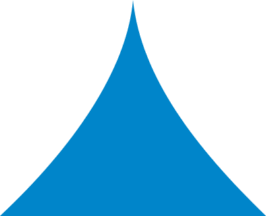
- Flag Coat of arms

- Møre og Romsdal within Norway

- Sykkylven within Møre og Romsdal
- Coordinates: 62°22′32″N 06°38′39″E
- Country: Norway
- County: Møre og Romsdal
- District: Sunnmøre
- Established: 1 Aug 1883
  - Preceded by: Ørskog Municipality
- Administrative centre: Aure

Government
  - Mayor (2023): Olav Harald Ulstein (FrP)

Area
  - Total: 337.80 km^{2} (130.43 sq mi)
  - Land: 328.55 km^{2} (126.85 sq mi)
  - Water: 9.25 km^{2} (3.57 sq mi) 2.7%
  - Rank: #252 in Norway
- Highest elevation: 1,579 m (5,180 ft)

Population (2024)
  - Total: 7,617
  - Rank: #136 in Norway
  - Density: 22.5/km^{2} (58/sq mi)
  - Change (10 years): ▼ −1.5%
- Demonym: Sykkylving

Official language
  - Norwegian form: Nynorsk
- Time zone: UTC+01:00 (CET)
  - Summer (DST): UTC+02:00 (CEST)
- ISO 3166 code: NO-1528
- Website: Official website

Sykkylven is a municipality in Møre og Romsdal county, Norway. It is part of the Sunnmøre region. The administrative centre is the village of Aure. Other villages in the municipality include Ikornnes, Straumgjerde, and Tusvika.

The 338-square-kilometre (131 sq mi) municipality is the 252nd largest by area out of the 357 municipalities in Norway. Sykkylven Municipality is the 136th most populous municipality in Norway, with a population of 7,617. The municipality's population density is 22.5 inhabitants per square kilometre (58/sq mi) and its population has decreased by 1.5% over the previous 10-year period.

== General information ==
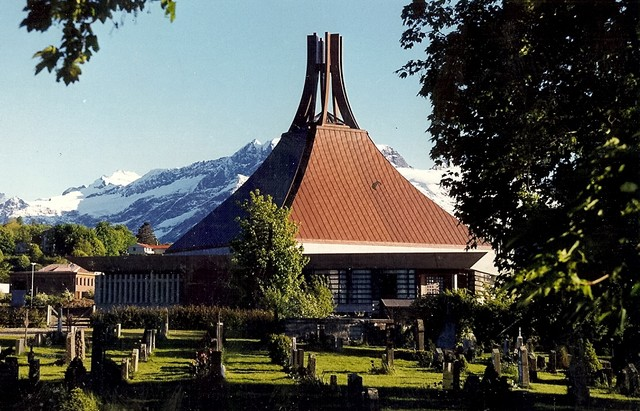
Sykkylven Church

The municipality of Sykkylven was established on 1 August 1883 when the large Ørskog Municipality was divided into two: the southern part became Sykkylven Municipality (population: 2,029) and the northern part remained as (a smaller) Ørskog Municipality (population: 1,735). On 1 June 1955, the Søvik-Ramstad area of Ørskog Municipality (population: 348) on the southern side of the Storfjorden was transferred to Sykkylven Municipality.

=== Name ===
The municipality (originally the parish) is named after Sykkylvsfjorden (Old Norse: Síkiflir). The first element is sík, which means "small lake" or "inlet" (referring to the lake, originally probably an inlet of Fitjavatnet). The last element is iflir, which is frequently used in the Sunnmøre area in the names of fjords. It possibly comes from the word viflir, which means "low, wet terrain". Historically, the name was spelled Søkelven. In 1889, the spelling was changed to Søkkelven. On 3 November 1917, a royal resolution changed the spelling of the name of the municipality to Sykkylven.

The slogan for the municipality was formerly "Sykkylven - vennlig, vill og vakker", meaning "Sykkylven - friendly, wild and beautiful". The current slogan is "Skaparkraft", literally meaning "creative" or "creating force", believed to create focus on the municipality's need for creating a new creative drive towards diversifying the somewhat one-sided furniture industry and more focus on tourism, especially "experience industry" possibilities.

=== Coat of arms ===
The coat of arms was granted on 30 April 1984 by royal decree. The official blazon is "Argent, a pile embowed issuant from base azure" (Norwegian: I sølv ein blå spiss laga med bogeliner). This means the arms have a field (background) with a tincture of argent, which means it is commonly colored white, but if it is made out of metal, then silver is used. The charge is a pile (triangle) with embowed (curved) sides. The design was chosen to symbolize the landscape of the Sykkylvsfjorden and is reminiscent of a large mountain silhouette from the municipality. The arms were designed by Norbert Hovet and Kårstein Blindheim. The municipal flag has the same design as the coat of arms.

=== Churches ===
The Church of Norway has two parishes (sokn) within Sykkylven Municipality. It is part of the Nordre Sunnmøre prosti (deanery) in the Diocese of Møre.

Churches in Sykkylven Municipality
Parish (sokn)	Church name	Location of the church	Year built
Sykkylven	Sykkylven Church	Aure	1990
Ikornnes	Ikornnes Church	Ikornnes	1978

== Geography ==
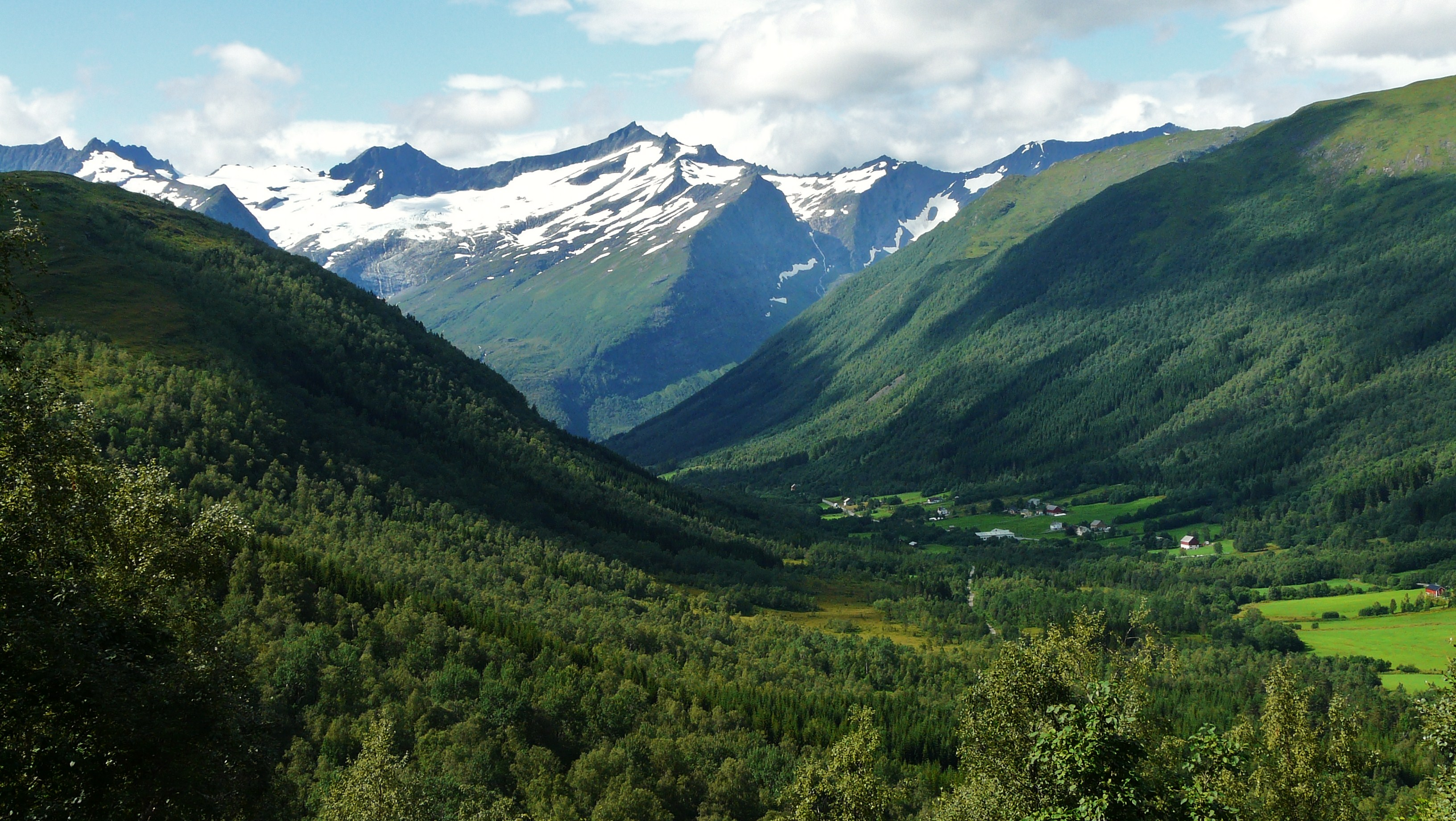
View of Velledalen

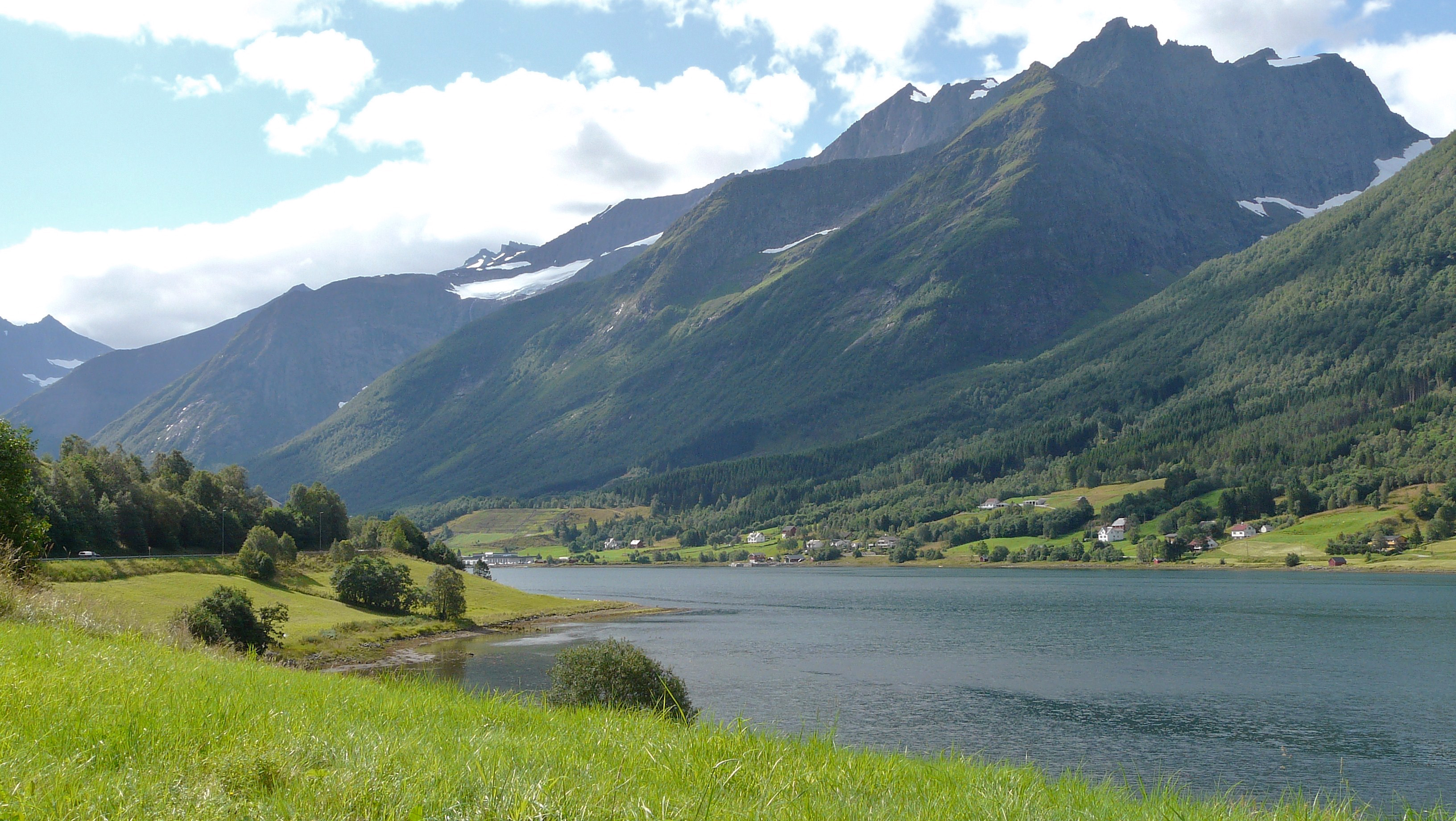
View of Sykkylvsfjorden and the Trollkyrkjetindane mountains

Sykkylven is a part of the Sunnmøre region and is surrounded by the beautiful alpine mountain range Sunnmørsalpene, including the mountain Råna. The highest point in the municipality is the 1,579-metre (5,180 ft) tall mountain Brekketindane, located on the border of Ørsta Municipality and Sykkylven Municipality (and very close to the border with Stranda Municipality). Most of the people in Sykkylven live along the Sykkylvsfjorden, which is a branch of the Storfjorden. The Sykkylven Bridge crosses the fjord connecting Aure to Ikornnes.

Sykkylven Municipality shares land borders with Fjord Municipality to the east, Stranda Municipality to the southeast, and Ørsta Municipality to the southwest. The Hjørundfjorden forms part of the western municipal border, and the Storfjorden forms the northern border. Across the Storfjorden to the north lies Ålesund Municipality.

== Economy ==
Sykkylven is primarily an industrial community where furniture and furnishings manufacturing is the dominant industry (78% of manufacturing employment in 2004). Some of the largest factories in the industry are located here. Major companies in Sykkylven include Ekornes AS, Scandinor ANS, Hjellegjerde, Brunstad AS, Hjelle, and Cylindra. Drones are also manufactured. Agriculture is important along the fjord and in the valleys. The farms are small, with an emphasis on livestock. There is also some fish farming at Hundeidvik and Søvik, along the Storfjorden. The local newspaper Sykkylvsbladet is published in Sykkylven.

Ekornes is the largest employer (as of 2020); however, a new round of layoffs was announced in January 2023.

== Government ==
Sykkylven Municipality is responsible for primary education (through 10th grade), outpatient health services, senior citizen services, welfare and other social services, zoning, economic development, and municipal roads and utilities. The municipality is governed by a municipal council of directly elected representatives. The mayor is indirectly elected by a vote of the municipal council. The municipality is under the jurisdiction of the Sunnmøre District Court and the Frostating Court of Appeal.

=== Municipal council ===
The municipal council (Kommunestyre) of Sykkylven Municipality is made up of 29 representatives who are elected to four-year terms. The tables below show the current and historical composition of the council by political party.

Sykkylven kommunestyre 2023–2027
Party name (in Nynorsk)	Number of representatives
Labour Party (Arbeidarpartiet)	4
Progress Party (Framstegspartiet)	9
Conservative Party (Høgre)	6
Christian Democratic Party (Kristeleg Folkeparti)	1
Centre Party (Senterpartiet)	6
Socialist Left Party (Sosialistisk Venstreparti)	1
Liberal Party (Venstre)	2
Total number of members:	29

Sykkylven kommunestyre 2019–2023
Party name (in Nynorsk)	Number of representatives
Labour Party (Arbeidarpartiet)	0
Progress Party (Framstegspartiet)	26
Conservative Party (Høgre)	0
Christian Democratic Party (Kristeleg Folkeparti)	0
Centre Party (Senterpartiet)	0
Socialist Left Party (Sosialistisk Venstreparti)	1
Liberal Party (Venstre)	2
Total number of members:	29

Sykkylven kommunestyre 2015–2019
Party name (in Nynorsk)	Number of representatives
Labour Party (Arbeidarpartiet)	6
Progress Party (Framstegspartiet)	6
Conservative Party (Høgre)	8
Christian Democratic Party (Kristeleg Folkeparti)	2
Centre Party (Senterpartiet)	4
Socialist Left Party (Sosialistisk Venstreparti)	1
Liberal Party (Venstre)	2
Total number of members:	29

Sykkylven kommunestyre 2011–2015
Party name (in Nynorsk)	Number of representatives
Labour Party (Arbeidarpartiet)	6
Progress Party (Framstegspartiet)	7
Conservative Party (Høgre)	7
Christian Democratic Party (Kristeleg Folkeparti)	3
Centre Party (Senterpartiet)	3
Socialist Left Party (Sosialistisk Venstreparti)	1
Liberal Party (Venstre)	2
Total number of members:	29

Sykkylven kommunestyre 2007–2011
Party name (in Nynorsk)	Number of representatives
Labour Party (Arbeidarpartiet)	4
Progress Party (Framstegspartiet)	7
Conservative Party (Høgre)	5
Christian Democratic Party (Kristeleg Folkeparti)	5
Centre Party (Senterpartiet)	4
Socialist Left Party (Sosialistisk Venstreparti)	2
Liberal Party (Venstre)	2
Total number of members:	29

Sykkylven kommunestyre 2003–2007
Party name (in Nynorsk)	Number of representatives
Labour Party (Arbeidarpartiet)	4
Progress Party (Framstegspartiet)	8
Conservative Party (Høgre)	4
Christian Democratic Party (Kristeleg Folkeparti)	5
Centre Party (Senterpartiet)	4
Socialist Left Party (Sosialistisk Venstreparti)	2
Liberal Party (Venstre)	2
Total number of members:	29

Sykkylven kommunestyre 1999–2003
Party name (in Nynorsk)	Number of representatives
Labour Party (Arbeidarpartiet)	6
Progress Party (Framstegspartiet)	4
Conservative Party (Høgre)	8
Christian Democratic Party (Kristeleg Folkeparti)	8
Centre Party (Senterpartiet)	4
Socialist Left Party (Sosialistisk Venstreparti)	2
Liberal Party (Venstre)	1
Total number of members:	33

Sykkylven kommunestyre 1995–1999
Party name (in Nynorsk)	Number of representatives
Labour Party (Arbeidarpartiet)	7
Progress Party (Framstegspartiet)	4
Conservative Party (Høgre)	7
Christian Democratic Party (Kristeleg Folkeparti)	6
Centre Party (Senterpartiet)	6
Socialist Left Party (Sosialistisk Venstreparti)	1
Liberal Party (Venstre)	2
Total number of members:	33

Sykkylven kommunestyre 1991–1995
Party name (in Nynorsk)	Number of representatives
Labour Party (Arbeidarpartiet)	7
Progress Party (Framstegspartiet)	3
Conservative Party (Høgre)	7
Christian Democratic Party (Kristeleg Folkeparti)	6
Centre Party (Senterpartiet)	6
Socialist Left Party (Sosialistisk Venstreparti)	2
Liberal Party (Venstre)	2
Total number of members:	33

Sykkylven kommunestyre 1987–1991
Party name (in Nynorsk)	Number of representatives
Labour Party (Arbeidarpartiet)	8
Progress Party (Framstegspartiet)	3
Conservative Party (Høgre)	7
Christian Democratic Party (Kristeleg Folkeparti)	6
Centre Party (Senterpartiet)	5
Socialist Left Party (Sosialistisk Venstreparti)	1
Liberal Party (Venstre)	3
Total number of members:	33

Sykkylven kommunestyre 1983–1987
Party name (in Nynorsk)	Number of representatives
Labour Party (Arbeidarpartiet)	8
Conservative Party (Høgre)	7
Christian Democratic Party (Kristeleg Folkeparti)	6
Centre Party (Senterpartiet)	5
Liberal Party (Venstre)	2
Common list for Sørestranda (Samlingsliste for Sørestranda)	3
Non-party election list for Sykkylven municipality (Upolitisk valliste for Sykkylven kommune)	2
Total number of members:	33

Sykkylven kommunestyre 1979–1983
Party name (in Nynorsk)	Number of representatives
Labour Party (Arbeidarpartiet)	6
Conservative Party (Høgre)	7
Christian Democratic Party (Kristeleg Folkeparti)	6
Centre Party (Senterpartiet)	6
Liberal Party (Venstre)	2
Common list for Sørestranda (Samlingsliste for Sørestranda)	3
Non-party election list (Upolitisk valliste)	3
Total number of members:	33

Sykkylven kommunestyre 1975–1979
Party name (in Nynorsk)	Number of representatives
Labour Party (Arbeidarpartiet)	5
Conservative Party (Høgre)	3
Christian Democratic Party (Kristeleg Folkeparti)	7
Centre Party (Senterpartiet)	10
Liberal Party (Venstre)	1
Non-party election list for Sykkylven (Upolitisk valliste for Sykkylven)	5
Non-party election list for Jarnes (Upolitisk valliste for Jarnes)	2
Total number of members:	33

Sykkylven kommunestyre 1971–1975
Party name (in Nynorsk)	Number of representatives
Labour Party (Arbeidarpartiet)	6
Conservative Party (Høgre)	2
Christian Democratic Party (Kristeleg Folkeparti)	5
Centre Party (Senterpartiet)	8
Liberal Party (Venstre)	2
Local List(s) (Lokale lister)	2
Total number of members:	25

Sykkylven kommunestyre 1967–1971
Party name (in Nynorsk)	Number of representatives
Labour Party (Arbeidarpartiet)	7
Conservative Party (Høgre)	2
Christian Democratic Party (Kristeleg Folkeparti)	6
Centre Party (Senterpartiet)	7
Liberal Party (Venstre)	3
Total number of members:	25

Sykkylven kommunestyre 1963–1967
Party name (in Nynorsk)	Number of representatives
Labour Party (Arbeidarpartiet)	6
Conservative Party (Høgre)	2
Christian Democratic Party (Kristeleg Folkeparti)	6
Centre Party (Senterpartiet)	6
Liberal Party (Venstre)	2
Local List(s) (Lokale lister)	3
Total number of members:	25

Sykkylven heradsstyre 1959–1963
Party name (in Nynorsk)	Number of representatives
Labour Party (Arbeidarpartiet)	5
Local List(s) (Lokale lister)	20
Total number of members:	25

Sykkylven heradsstyre 1955–1959
Party name (in Nynorsk)	Number of representatives
Labour Party (Arbeidarpartiet)	4
Local List(s) (Lokale lister)	21
Total number of members:	25

Sykkylven heradsstyre 1951–1955
Party name (in Nynorsk)	Number of representatives
Local List(s) (Lokale lister)	20
Total number of members:	20

Sykkylven heradsstyre 1947–1951
Party name (in Nynorsk)	Number of representatives
Labour Party (Arbeidarpartiet)	1
Local List(s) (Lokale lister)	19
Total number of members:	20

Sykkylven heradsstyre 1945–1947
Party name (in Nynorsk)	Number of representatives
Labour Party (Arbeidarpartiet)	4
Local List(s) (Lokale lister)	16
Total number of members:	20

Sykkylven heradsstyre 1937–1941*
Party name (in Nynorsk)	Number of representatives
Labour Party (Arbeidarpartiet)	4
Local List(s) (Lokale lister)	16
Total number of members:	20
Note: Due to the German occupation of Norway during World War II, no elections were held for new municipal councils until after the war ended in 1945.

=== Mayors ===
The mayor (Nynorsk: ordførar) of Sykkylven Municipality is the political leader of the municipality and the chairperson of the municipal council. Here is a list of people who have held this position:

- 1883–1887: Lars P. Grebstad
- 1888–1898: Ole E. Vik
- 1899–1904: P.C.N. Aure
- 1905–1907: Ole E. Vik
- 1908–1910: P.C.N. Aure
- 1911–1919: Ole I. Strømme
- 1919–1924: P.C.N. Aure
- 1924–1933: Hans Tandstad
- 1933–1937: Johan Eidem
- 1938–1941: Ola Tandstad
- 1945–1946: Ola Tandstad
- 1946–1951: Johan Eidem
- 1952–1956: Jens E. Ekornes (KrF)
- 1956–1959: Fridtjof Fredriksen
- 1959–1963: Ola Tu
- 1964–1969: Arnold Weiberg-Aurdal (Sp)
- 1970–1975: Øystein Eliassen (Ap)
- 1976–1986: Johan Welle (Sp)
- 1987–1999: Svein Helgheim (H)
- 1999–2011: Jan Kåre Aurdal (KrF)
- 2011–2015: Petter Lyshol (H)
- 2015–2023: Odd Jostein Drotninghaug (Sp)
- 2023–present: Olav Harald Ulstein (FrP

== Notable people ==
- Edvard Drabløs (1883 in Sykkylven – 1976), an actor and theatre director
- Jens E. Ekornes (1908 in Sykkylven – 1976), the founder of the furniture company Ekornes AS, (Norwegian Wiki)
- Arnold Weiberg-Aurdal (1925–2016), an agronomist, military officer, and mayor of Sykkylven
- Jan Otto Myrseth (born 1957 in Sykkylven), a prelate and Bishop of Tunsberg from 2018

=== Musicians ===
- Kenneth Ekornes (born 1974 in Sykkylven), a jazz musician (percussion) and one of The Brazz Brothers
- Hilde Louise Asbjørnsen (born 1976 in Sykkylven), a jazz singer, songwriter, cabaret artist, and songwriter
