= Møre (newspaper) =

Norwegian newspaper

Møre (Urban East Norwegian: [ˈmø̂ːrə]) is a local Norwegian newspaper published once a week in Møre og Romsdal county.

Møre covers news in Volda Municipality and Ørsta Municipality as well as throughout Møre og Romsdal county. It is Norway's oldest local newspaper that is still published, and it is the second-oldest newspaper in the country, after Adresseavisen. The newspaper is edited by Tore Aarflot. It is published three times a week (Tuesdays, Thursdays, and Saturdays) and all of the edited material is published in Nynorsk.

The newspaper is owned by the company Aarflots Prenteverk, which runs the media house, where the newspaper is a major component of its operations. The business is also engaged in graphic design and printing.

== History ==
In 1808 the farmer, bailiff, politician, and postmaster Sivert Aarflot received permission to start printing at Ekset in Volda. He started printing in 1809, and in 1810 he produced his first newspaper: Norsk Landboeblad. This newspaper changed its name many times, and since 1902 or 1903 it has been called Møre.

The Sivert Aarflot Museum is dedicated to the story of Sivert Aarflot and his press and newspaper. Among other items, the museum contains his first press and a somewhat more modern screw press. The museum was opened following an agreement with company CEO Tore Aarflot.

== Circulation ==
According to the Norwegian Audit Bureau of Circulations and National Association of Local Newspapers, Møre has had the following annual circulation:

- 2004: 3,775
- 2005: 3,746
- 2006: 3,759
- 2007: 3,752
- 2008: 3,735
- 2009: 3,722
- 2010: 3,690
- 2011: 3,650
- 2012: 3,578
- 2013: 3,449
- 2014: 3,373
- 2015: 3,317
- 2016: 3,195
