= Aarflot =

Aarflot is a Norwegian surname. Notable people with the surname include:

- Andreas Aarflot (born 1928), Norwegian theologian and bishop
- Berte Canutte Aarflot (1795–1859), Norwegian hymnwriter
- Johannes Aarflot (1824–1891), Norwegian politician and businessman
- Mauritz Aarflot (1821–1904), Norwegian politician and editor
- Rasmus Aarflot (1792–1845), Norwegian politician and editor
- Sivert Aarflot (1759–1817), Norwegian educator and printer
