= Dalsfjord =

Dalsfjord or Dalsfjorden may refer to:

- Dalsfjord Municipality, a former municipality in Møre og Romsdal county, Norway
- Dalsfjord Church, a church in Volda Municipality in Møre og Romsdal county, Norway
- Dalsfjorden (Luster), a fjord in Luster Municipality in Vestland county, Norway
- Dalsfjorden (Sunnfjord), a fjord in the Sunnfjord district of Vestland county, Norway
- Dalsfjorden (Sunnmøre), a fjord in Volda Municipality in Møre og Romsdal county, Norway
