= Dalsfjorden =

Dalsfjorden may refer to:

- Dalsfjorden (Sunnmøre), a fjord in Volda Municipality in Møre og Romsdal county, Norway
- Dalsfjorden (Sunnfjord), a fjord in Sogn og Fjordane county, Norway
