= Norsk Landboeblad =

1800s Norwegian newspaper

Norsk Landboeblad was a former Norwegian newspaper published during the early 1800s.

Norsk Landboeblad was published in the community of Volda in Møre og Romsdal, Norway. It had a circulation of 600, a considerable number at that time. This paper can be regarded as a predecessor to the present-day newspaper Møre, which is a local newspaper for Volda Municipality and Ørsta Municipality and the region of Sunnmøre. The newspaper is owned by Aarflots Prenteverk AS, which also operates other activities such as graphic design and printing.

In 1809, Sivert Aarflot (1759–1817) opened a print shop at the village of Egset in what is now Volda Municipality. Norsk Landboeblad was published and printed by Sivert Aarflot from 1810 until his death in 1817. After his death, his son Rasmus Aarflot (1792–1845) took over his father's publication and printing company. The Sivert Aarflot Museum in Volda features equipment from the original printing works.

== Other sources ==
- Ottosen, Rune; Lars Arve Røssland; Helge Østbye (2002) Norsk Pressehistorie (Oslo: Det Norske Samlaget) ISBN 978-82-521-5750-5
