= Dalsfjord Lighthouse Museum =

Coordinates: 62°6′45.85″N 5°56′19.72″E

The Dalsfjord Lighthouse Museum (Norwegian: Dalsfjord fyrmuseum) is a Norwegian museum founded in 1993. It is dedicated to documenting and presenting the social history of the people that built lighthouses, sector lights, markers, moorings, and ports along the Norwegian coastline.

The museum is located in Dravlaus in Volda Municipality, and it is part of the Sunnmøre Museum Foundation. The museum was opened in a new location with a new exhibit on November 8, 2012.

== Entrance Fees ==
Adults: 60 NOK (5.34 USD)

Children: 40 NOK (3.56 USD)

Seniors: 50 NOK (4.45 USD)

Group price: 50 NOK (4.45 USD)
