= Ulvestad =

Ulvestad is a surname. Notable people with the surname include:

- Dan Peter Ulvestad (born 1989), Norwegian footballer
- Fredrik Ulvestad (born 1992), Norwegian footballer
- Martin Ulvestad (1865–1942), Norwegian-born American historian
- Pål Erik Ulvestad (born 1990), Norwegian footballer
- Rune Ulvestad (born 1957), Norwegian football coach and former player
- Siri Ulvestad (born 1988), Norwegian orienteering competitor and cross-country skier
