= Ragnhild Aarflot Kalland =

Norwegian politician (born 1960)

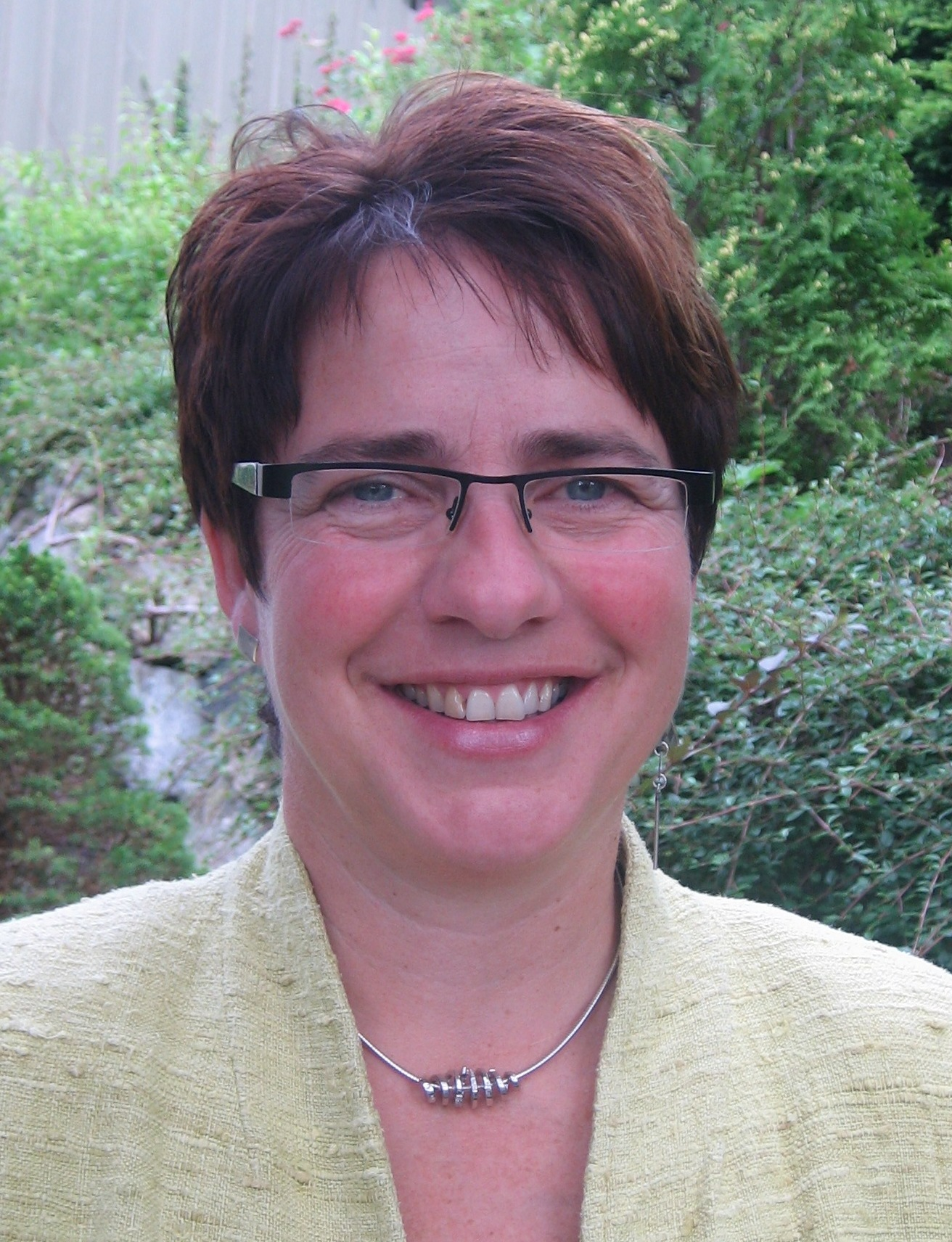
Ragnhild Aarflot Kalland

Ragnhild Aarflot Kalland (born 4 September 1960) is a Norwegian politician for the Centre Party.

She served as a deputy representative to the Norwegian Parliament from Møre og Romsdal during the terms 2001–2005 and 2005–2009.

On the local level, she was mayor of Volda Municipality from 2003 to 2011.
