= Asbjørn Blokkum Flø =

Norwegian composer and musician

- Born: 6 May 1973; Volda Municipality, Norway
- Occupations: Composer, musician, sound artist
- Writing career
- Genres: Contemporary music, sound art

Asbjørn Blokkum Flø (born 6 May 1973 in Volda Municipality) is a Norwegian composer, musician and sound artist. He studied composition at the Norwegian Academy of Music in Oslo with Lasse Thoresen, Asbjørn Schaathun and Ivar Frounberg. He writes chamber music and electronic music as well as working with sound installations such as the work Norway Remixed (2002), described as a "collaborative musical composition".

In 1999 he won the competition Traditional expressions and new technologies, initiated by the Norwegian Cultural Council, with the installation The Leap. Flø represented Norway in the competition Ars Acustica in 2003 and the Prix Italia in 2005. In 2008 he wrote Karlheinz Stockhausen – A pioneer in Utopia, the first Norwegian text collection about the composer Karlheinz Stockhausen, along with composers Asbjørn Schaathun and Jøran Rudi. Flø has participated in several recordings both solo and with the band (x, y, z). These recordings include Filtered Through Friends (2001), Soun (2003), Crashing Happy (2006) and Klank (2011).
