= Olav Rune Ekeland Bastrup =

Norwegian writer and historian

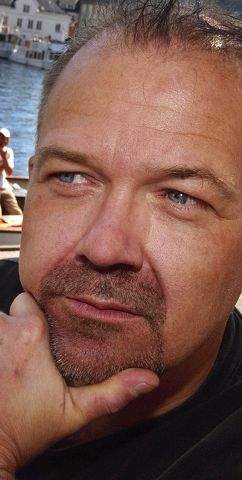

Olav Rune Ekeland Bastrup (born 4 September 1956, in Volda Municipality) is a Norwegian writer and historian. He has published numerous books on social history subjects such as the use of eugenics in Scandinavia and the Norwegian roma-minority. He spoke at the Solidaritetskongressen, Gjøvik, August 2005.

== Works ==
- Olav Rune Ekeland Bastrup, Aage Georg Sivertsen, En landevei mot undergangen. Utryddelsen av taterkulturen Norge, Universitetsforlaget, 1996, ISBN 978-82-00-22773-1 ("The road to destruction. Eradication of gypsy culture of Norway")
- El Jucan: asfaltens sønn : historien om fakirens liv, Aschehoug, 1993, ISBN 978-82-03-17148-2
- Olav Rune Ekeland Bastrup, Ulrik Sissener Kirkedam, Hisøy menighetsråd, Jubileumsskrift for Hisøy kirke gjennom 150 år, Hisøy historielag, 1999, ISBN 9788291990026
