= Bjørke Church (Volda) =

Church in Møre og Romsdal, Norway

- Bjørke kyrkje
- Storfjorden kyrkje
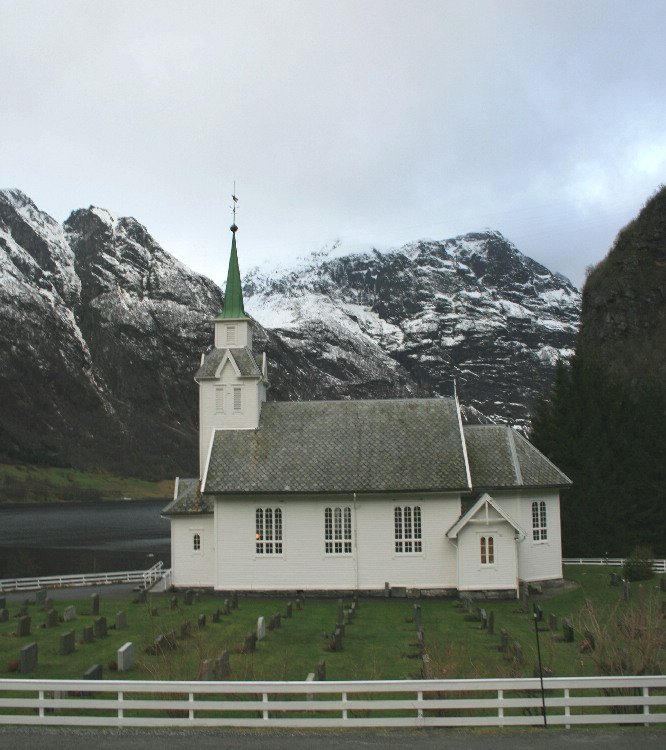
- View of the church
- Bjørke Church
- 62.107145654°N 6.5562940836°E
- Location: Volda, Møre og Romsdal
- Country: Norway
- Denomination: Church of Norway
- Churchmanship: Evangelical Lutheran

History
- Status: Parish church
- Founded: 1920
- Consecrated: 16 September 1920

Architecture
- Functional status: Active
- Architect: Mathias Brække
- Architectural type: Long church
- Completed: 1920 (106 years ago)

Specifications
- Capacity: 200
- Materials: Wood

Administration
- Diocese: Møre bispedømme
- Deanery: Søre Sunnmøre prosti
- Parish: Storfjorden
- Norwegian Cultural Heritage Site
- Type: Church
- Status: Not protected
- ID: 85584

Bjørke Church (Norwegian: Bjørke kyrkje, also known as Storfjorden kyrkje) is a parish church of the Church of Norway in Volda Municipality in Møre og Romsdal county, Norway. It is located in the village of Bjørke at the innermost end of the Hjørundfjorden (which is also known as the Storfjorden). It is the church for the Storfjorden parish which is part of the Søre Sunnmøre prosti (deanery) in the Diocese of Møre. The white, wooden church was built in a long church design in 1920 using plans drawn up by the architect Mathias Brække. The church seats about 200 people. The church was consecrated on 16 September 1920 by Bishop Peter Hognestad.

== History ==
Bjørke Chapel was originally designed by Mathias Brække and it was built by the builders Sivert Gjerdsdal and Edvard Gjerdsdal. Construction began in 1919 and the new building was completed in 1920. It was consecrated by the Bishop on 16 September 1920. The building is a wooden long church with a rectangular nave and a smaller, rectangular chancel on the east end of the nave. The west end has a church porch with a tower. The building was originally an annex chapel under the main Hjørundfjord Church but in 1929 it was upgraded to the status of parish church.

== Media gallery ==
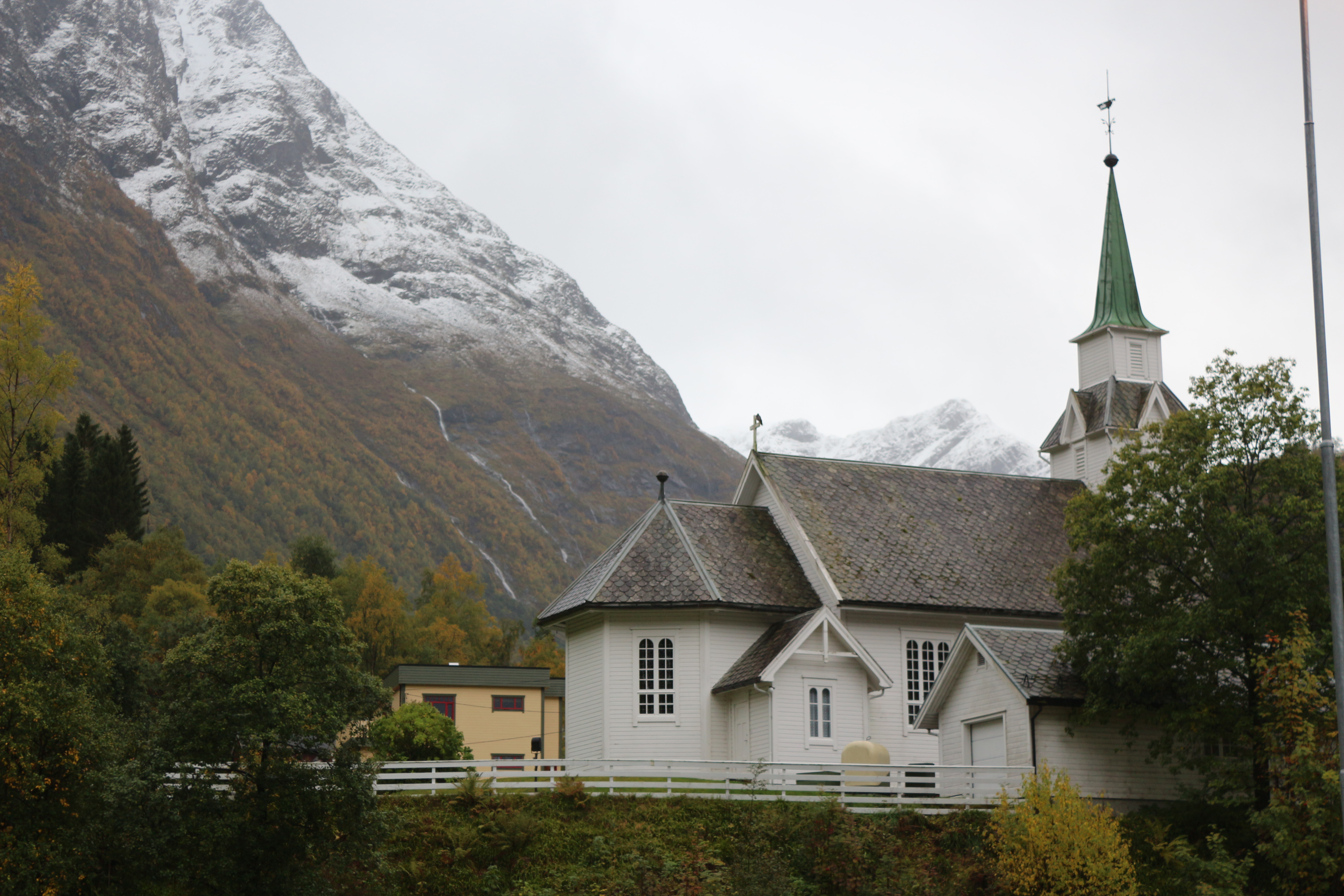

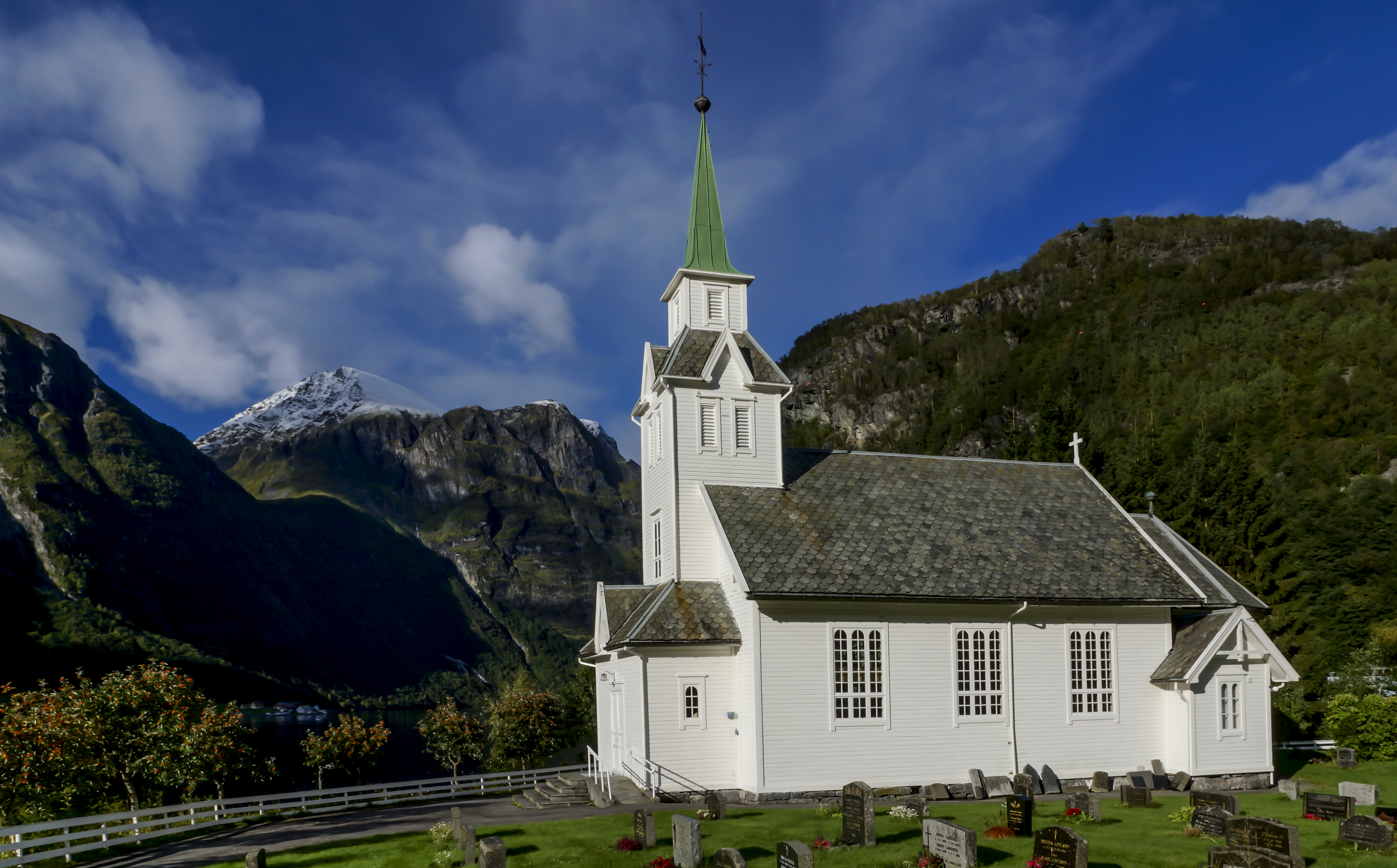

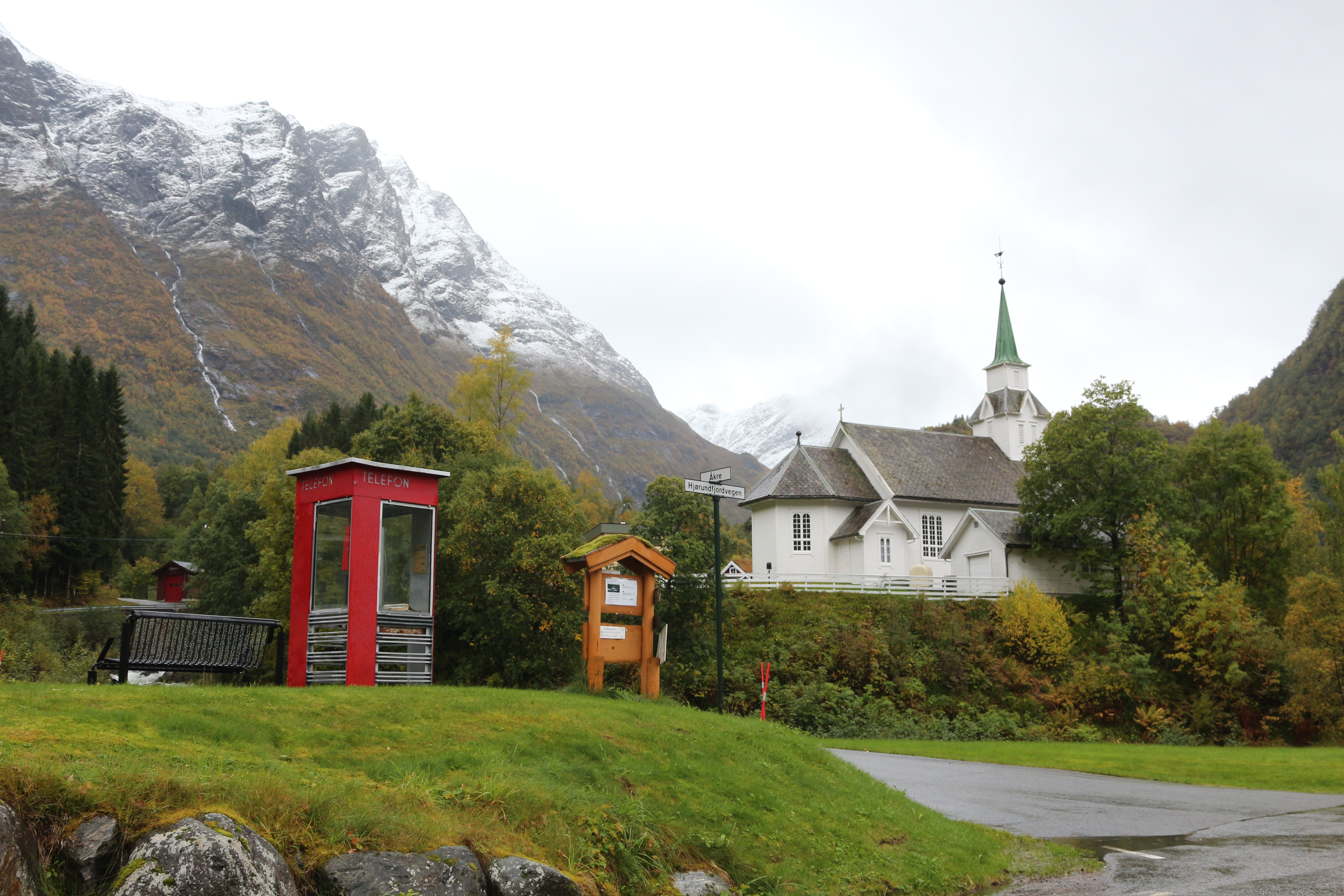

== See also ==
- List of churches in Møre
