= Berte Canutte Aarflot =

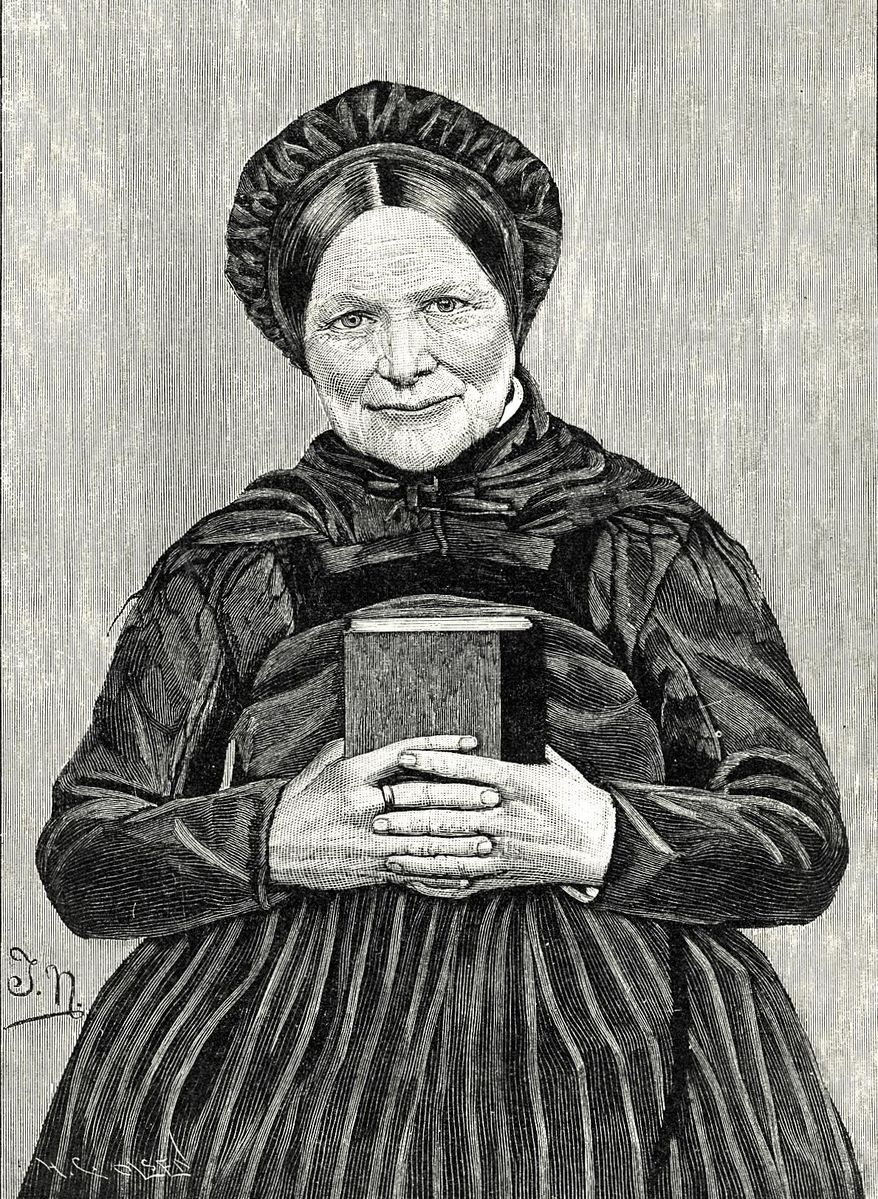

Background information
- Born: 3 January 1795; Ørsta, Romsdalen, Norway
- Died: 29 October 1859 (aged 64)
- Occupation(s): Christian hymnwriter and author

Berte Canutte Aarflot (3 January 1795 – 29 October 1859) was a Norwegian Christian hymnwriter and author within the Haugean Movement (haugianere).

== Personal and early life ==
Berte Canutte Aarflot was born at Årflot, a family farm located in the prestegjeld of Ørsten (now Ørsta Municipality) in Romsdalen county, Norway to Sivert Aarflot (1759–1817) and his wife Gunhild Rasmusdotter Eikrem (1756–1836). The family moved to the village of Ekset in Volda when she was four years old. Berte Canutte gained knowledge of the pietism teachings of Hans Nielsen Hauge as a small child, and around 1800 joined a small circle of Haugeans led by Vebjørn Svendsen in Volda.

Berte Canutte learned writing at home and by maintaining letter correspondence with fellow Haugeans. At the age of twelve, Berte Canutte started writing spiritual hymns. Her father was a newspaper publisher who had set up the first library and printing house in the village. He was impressed by her writings and, in the last years of his life, recommended she publish them for a larger audience. He recommended the title En gudelskende Siels opbyggelige Sange (A God-Worshiping Soul's Edifying Hymns). The booklet was released in 1820 by her older brother Rasmus Aarflot (1792–1845), who continued the Aarflot printing firm after the death of their father in 1817.

== Later life and death ==
On 7 June 1816, Berte Canutte married Amund Knutsson Hovdenakk (1788-1860), son of farmer Knut Jonsson Hovdenakk (c. 1734–1790) and his wife Mari Eliasdotter Mele (1744–1830). They maintained a farm at Årflot from 1819 to 1852, and together had seven children. The farm hosted gatherings for fellow Haugeans. In 1822, a visit with the lay minister Amund Knutsson Brekke (1776-1835) from the island of Gurskøya inspired Berte Canutte to remain a humble and loyal servant of Jesus Christ in her writing and speech. She continued with her spiritual writings throughout the remainder of her life. Berte Canutte Aarflot died of brain haemorrhage in 1859.

Bjørnstjerne Bjørnson wrote the following about her in Aftenbladet:

This affectionate woman has lived for the edification of the many. Her deep, religious songs remain a treasure in every farmer's house from Trondheim to Bergen County; and have also traveled beyond the country and is being sung in the neighbouring countries. One might say about her, that few in this country have in a wide area contributed that much to the growth of religion as her. (Note: Norwegian: Denne gudhengivne Kvinde har levet til Manges Opbyggelse. Hendes dybe, religiøse Sange er en Skat i hver Bondes Hus hele Trondhjems og Bergens Stift igjennem; er ogsaa vandret længere udover Landet og synges tillige i Nabolandene. Man tør om hende sige, at Faa her i Landet har i en vid Kreds bidraget saaledes til Religionens Væxt som hun)

== Legacy ==
The Student Administration Building, with library and auditorium, at Volda University College is named Berte Kanutte Aarflot-bygg in her honour.

== Works ==
- En gudelskende Siels opbyggelige Sange, 1820
- Troens Frugt. En Samling af aandelige Sange; i tvende Dele, 1830
- Troens Frugt. En Samling af religiøse Opmuntrings og Opbyggelses-Breve, 1844
- Sjælens Morgen- og Aftenoffer. Bønner, Sukke og Sange paa hver Dag i Ugen tilligemed Sange paa de fire Aarets Tider, 1846
- Sjælens aandelige Høitidsglæde, indeholdende Bønner og Sange paa de i Aaret indfaldende Høitidsdage, 1853
- Leilighedssange, 1853
- Religiøse Breve til Opmuntring og Opbyggelse samt Bestyrkelse i Tro, Haab og Kjærlighed, 1853
- Smuler til Næring for Livet i Gud. En Samling af Skrifter, 1856–62
- Berte Kanutte Siversdatter Aarflots Selvbiografi, indeholdende Optegnelser om hendes aandelige Livsudvikling, tilligemed Sognepræst Wraamanns Tale ved hendes Grav samt nogle Mindesange, 1860
- Før ikke udgivne Breve og Sange, utg. ved B. Støylen og H. G. Heggtveit, som del 3 i Berte Kanutte Aarflot. To Livsskildringer, 1893

== See also ==
- Johannes Aarflot

== Other sources ==
- Fjæreide, Kari Hop (2012) Berte Kanutte Siversdatter Aarflot: Omsorg for sjelen (Det teologiske menighetsfakultet)

== Related Reading ==
- Grindal, Gracia (2011) Preaching from Home: The Stories of Seven Lutheran Women Hymn Writers (Wm. B. Eerdmans Publishing) ISBN 9780802865014
- Wee, Mons Olson (1919) Haugeanism: A Brief Sketch of the Movement and Some of Its Chief Exponents (Harvard University)
