= Dalsfjord Municipality =

Former municipality in Møre og Romsdal, Norway

Dalsfjord Municipality Dalsfjord herred
- Former municipality
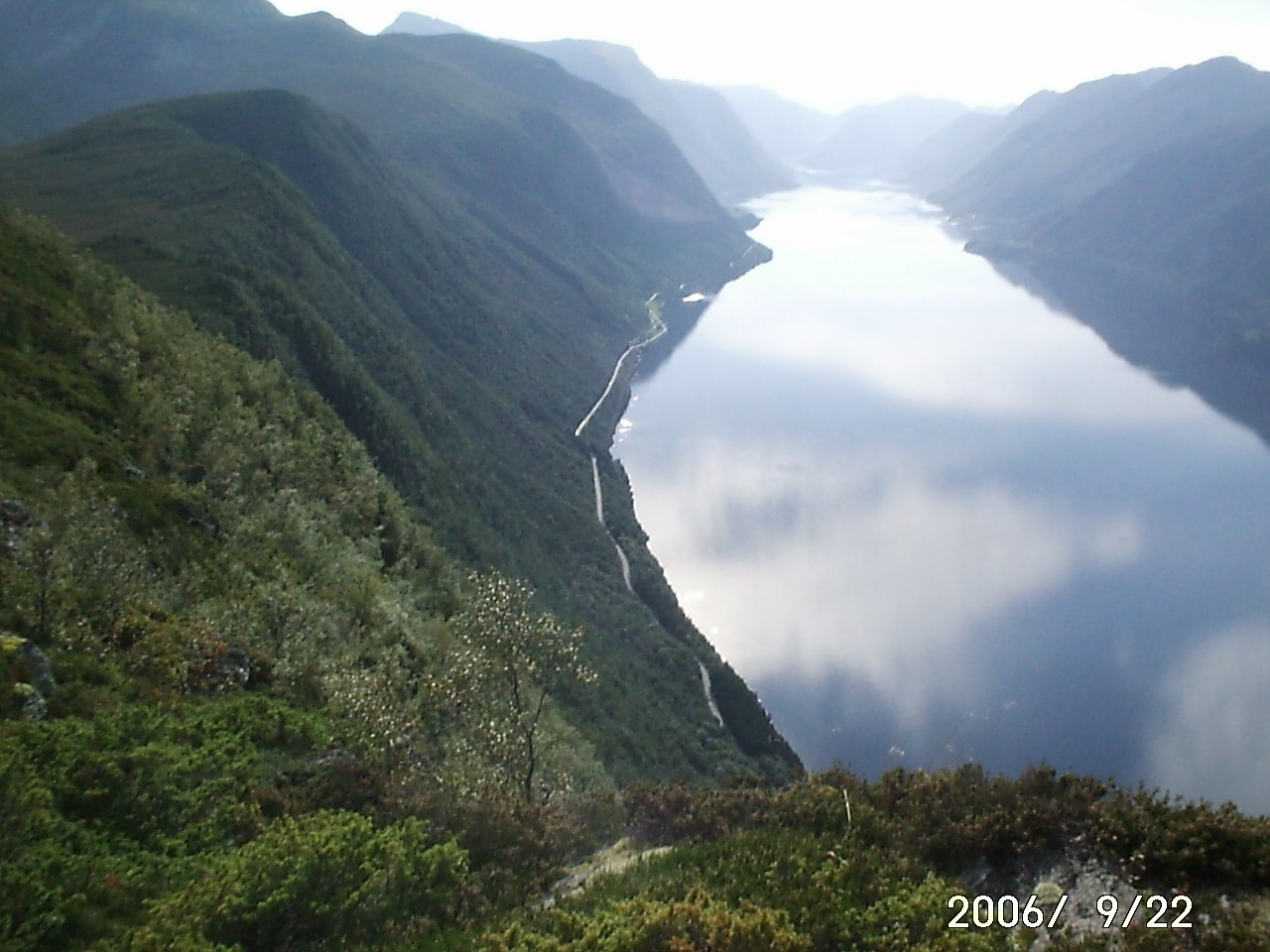

- Møre og Romsdal within Norway

- Dalsfjord within Møre og Romsdal
- Coordinates: 62°07′27″N 05°56′35″E
- Country: Norway
- County: Møre og Romsdal
- District: Sunnmøre
- Established: 1 July 1924
  - Preceded by: Volda Municipality
- Disestablished: 1 Jan 1964
  - Succeeded by: Volda Municipality
- Administrative centre: Dravlaus

Government
  - Mayor (1960–1963): S.P. Løvik

Area (upon dissolution)
  - Total: 164.5 km^{2} (63.5 sq mi)
  - Rank: #418 in Norway
- Highest elevation: 1,285 m (4,216 ft)

Population (1963)
  - Total: 1,150
  - Rank: #590 in Norway
  - Density: 7/km^{2} (18/sq mi)
  - Change (10 years): ▼ −0.2%
- Demonym: Dalsfjording

Official language
  - Norwegian form: Nynorsk
- Time zone: UTC+01:00 (CET)
  - Summer (DST): UTC+02:00 (CEST)
- ISO 3166 code: NO-1518

Dalsfjord is a former municipality in Møre og Romsdal county, Norway. The 164.5-square-kilometre (63.5 sq mi) municipality existed from 1924 until its dissolution in 1964. The area is now part of Volda Municipality in the traditional district of Sunnmøre. The administrative centre was the village of Dravlaus. Other villages in the municipality included Ulvestadbygda (Ulvestad, Lauvstad, and Sætre), Åmelfot, Steinsvik, and Dalsbygda.

Prior to its dissolution in 1964, the 164.5-square-kilometre (63.5 sq mi) municipality was the 418th largest by area out of the 689 municipalities in Norway. Dalsfjord Municipality was the 590th most populous municipality in Norway with a population of about 1,150. The municipality's population density was 7 inhabitants per square kilometre (18/sq mi) and its population had decreased by 0.2% over the previous 10-year period.

== General information ==
Historically, the area of Dalsfjord was a part of Volda Municipality (see formannskapsdistrikt law). On 1 July 1924, the parish of Dalsfjord was separated from Volda Municipality and it was established as the new Dalsfjord Municipality. Initially, Dalsfjord Municipality had a population of 960. During the 1960s, there were many municipal mergers across Norway due to the work of the Schei Committee. On 1 January 1964, Dalsfjord Municipality (population: 1,151) ceased to exist when it was merged back into Volda Municipality.

=== Name ===
The municipality is named after the Dalsfjorden since it is the central geographical feature of the municipality. The first element is dal which means "valley" or "dale". The last element is fjord which means "fjord".

=== Churches ===
The Church of Norway had one parish (sokn) within Dalsfjord Municipality. At the time of the municipal dissolution, it was part of the Volda prestegjeld and the Søre Sunnmøre prosti (deanery) in the Diocese of Bjørgvin.

Churches in Dalsfjord Municipality
Parish (sokn)	Church name	Location of the church	Year built
Dalsfjord	Dalsfjord Church	Dravlaus	1910

== Geography ==
The municipality was located south of the Voldsfjorden and it surrounded the entire Dalsfjorden. The highest point in the municipality was the 1,285-metre (4,216 ft) tall mountain Trollvasstinden, on the border with Volda Municipality. Rovde Municipality, Syvde Municipality, and Vanylven Municipality were all located to the west. Eid Municipality (in Sogn og Fjordane county) was located to the south. Volda Municipality and the Voldsfjorden were located to the east

== Government ==
While it existed, Dalsfjord Municipality was responsible for primary education (through 10th grade), outpatient health services, senior citizen services, welfare and other social services, zoning, economic development, and municipal roads and utilities. The municipality was governed by a municipal council of directly elected representatives. The mayor was indirectly elected by a vote of the municipal council. The municipality was under the jurisdiction of the Frostating Court of Appeal.

=== Municipal council ===
The municipal council (Heradsstyre) of Dalsfjord Municipality was made up of 17 representatives that were elected to four year terms. The tables below show the historical composition of the council by political party.

Dalsfjord heradsstyre 1959–1963
Party name (in Nynorsk)	Number of representatives
Local List(s) (Lokale lister)	17
Total number of members:	17

Dalsfjord heradsstyre 1955–1959
Party name (in Nynorsk)	Number of representatives
Local List(s) (Lokale lister)	17
Total number of members:	17

Dalsfjord heradsstyre 1951–1955
Party name (in Nynorsk)	Number of representatives
Labour Party (Arbeidarpartiet)	2
Local List(s) (Lokale lister)	14
Total number of members:	16

Dalsfjord heradsstyre 1947–1951
Party name (in Nynorsk)	Number of representatives
Labour Party (Arbeidarpartiet)	1
Local List(s) (Lokale lister)	15
Total number of members:	16

Dalsfjord heradsstyre 1945–1947
Party name (in Nynorsk)	Number of representatives
List of workers, fishermen, and small farmholders (Arbeidarar, fiskarar, småbrukarar liste)	2
Local List(s) (Lokale lister)	14
Total number of members:	16

Dalsfjord heradsstyre 1937–1941*
Party name (in Nynorsk)	Number of representatives
Labour Party (Arbeidarpartiet)	3
Local List(s) (Lokale lister)	13
Total number of members:	16
Note: Due to the German occupation of Norway during World War II, no elections were held for new municipal councils until after the war ended in 1945.

=== Mayors ===
The mayor (Nynorsk: ordførar) of Dalsfjord Municipality was the political leader of the municipality and the chairperson of the municipal council. The following people have held this position:

- 1924–1940: Knut Steinsvik
- 1941–1945: S.P. Løvik
- 1946–1951: Knut Rødstøl
- 1951–1958: Jakob K. Velsvik
- 1958–1960: Lars Velsvik
- 1960–1963: S.P. Løvik

== See also ==
- List of former municipalities of Norway
