= Dravlaus =

Village in Volda Municipality, Norway

- Village
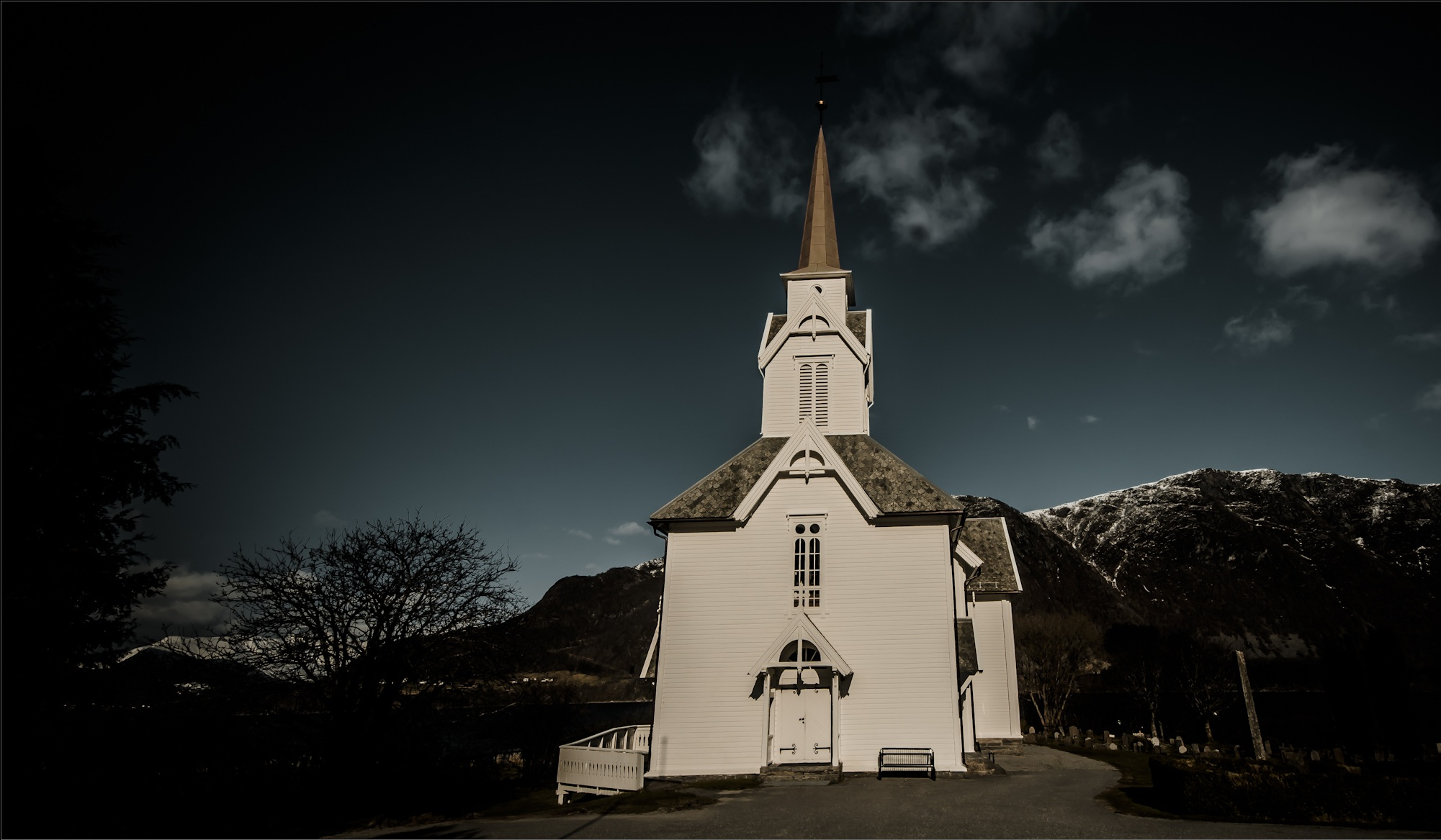
- View of the village church
- Interactive map of Dravlaus
- Location within Møre og Romsdal Location within Norway
- Coordinates: 62.1236°N 5.9396°E
- Country: Norway
- Region: Western Norway
- County: Møre og Romsdal
- District: Sunnmøre
- Municipality: Volda Municipality
- Elevation: 19 m (62 ft)
- Time zone: UTC+01:00 (CET)
  - Summer (DST): UTC+02:00 (CEST)
- Post Code: 6133 Lauvstad

Dravlaus is a village in Volda Municipality in Møre og Romsdal county, Norway. The village is located along the Dalsfjorden, about 5 kilometres (3.1 mi) south of the village of Lauvstad. The Dravlausdalen valley runs west from Dravlaus, along the Dravlauselva river. Dalsfjord Church is located in Dravlaus, along the shore of the fjord.

The Dalsfjord Lighthouse Museum is located in Dravlaus.

The village was the administrative centre of the old Dalsfjord Municipality which existed from 1924 until 1964.
