= Volda Municipality =

Municipality in Møre og Romsdal, Norway

Volda Municipality Volda kommune
- Municipality
- Volden herred (historic name)
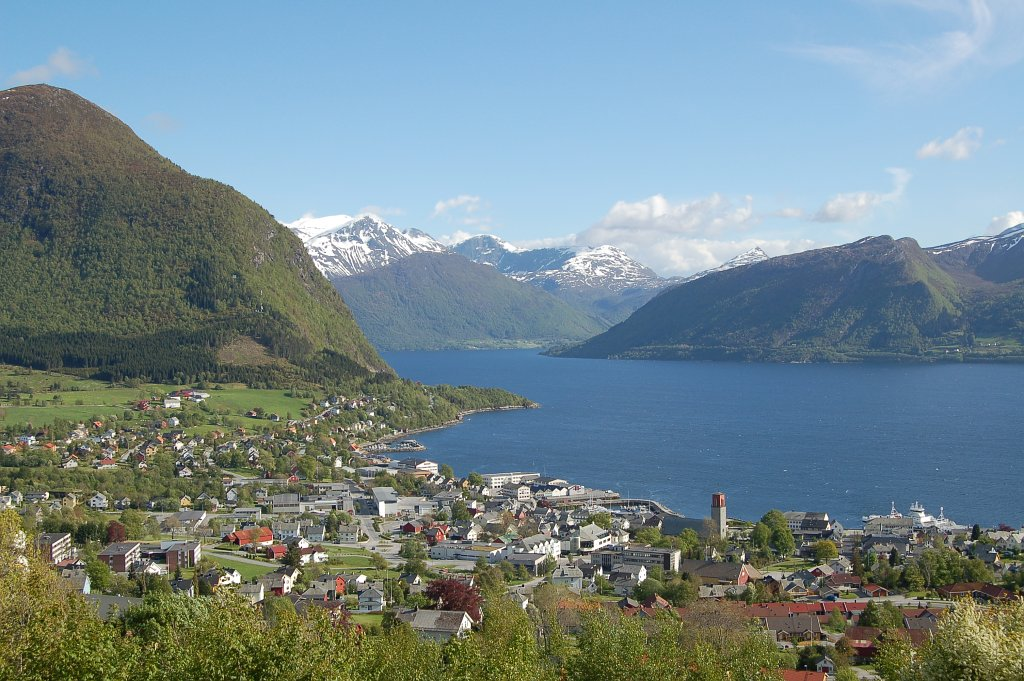
- View of Volda and the Voldsfjorden

- Coat of arms

- Møre og Romsdal within Norway

- Volda within Møre og Romsdal
- Coordinates: 62°05′16″N 06°00′51″E
- Country: Norway
- County: Møre og Romsdal
- District: Sunnmøre
- Established: 1 Jan 1838
  - Created as: Formannskapsdistrikt
- Administrative centre: Volda

Government
  - Mayor (2019): Sølvi Dimmen (Sp)

Area
  - Total: 876.87 km^{2} (338.56 sq mi)
  - Land: 833.63 km^{2} (321.87 sq mi)
  - Water: 43.24 km^{2} (16.70 sq mi) 4.9%
  - Rank: #132 in Norway
- Highest elevation: 1,700.32 m (5,578.5 ft)

Population (2024)
  - Total: 11,093
  - Rank: #104 in Norway
  - Density: 12.7/km^{2} (33/sq mi)
  - Change (10 years): ▲ +9.5%
- Demonym: Volding

Official language
  - Norwegian form: Nynorsk
- Time zone: UTC+01:00 (CET)
  - Summer (DST): UTC+02:00 (CEST)
- ISO 3166 code: NO-1577
- Website: Official website

Volda is a municipality in Møre og Romsdal county, Norway. It is part of the Sunnmøre region. The administrative centre is the village of Volda. Other villages in the municipality include Dravlaus, Fyrde, Straumshamn, Leira, Bjørke, and Grodås. The municipality is located about 50 kilometres (31 mi) south of the town of Ålesund.

The 877-square-kilometre (339 sq mi) municipality is the 132nd largest by area out of the 357 municipalities in Norway. Volda Municipality is the 104th most populous municipality in Norway with a population of 11,093. The municipality's population density is 12.7 inhabitants per square kilometre (33/sq mi) and its population has increased by 9.5% over the previous 10-year period.

== Name ==
The municipality (originally the parish) is named after the Voldsfjorden (Vǫld or Valdr). The meaning of the name is uncertain, but it may come from vella which means "gush" or "roar" or from another word meaning "wave". It could be compared with the welle which means "wave". Historically, the name of the municipality was spelled Volden. On 3 November 1917, a royal resolution changed the spelling of the name of the municipality to Volda.

== Coat of arms ==
Arms in use from 1987 to 2019

Current arms since 2020

The original coat of arms was granted on 19 June 1987 and they were in use until 1 January 2020 when the municipality was greatly enlarged. The official blazon was "Azure, a downwards pointing fountain pen nib argent" (Norwegian: På blå grunn ein nedvend sølv pennesplitt). This means the arms had a blue field (background) and the charge was the tip of a fountain pen. The charge had a tincture of argent which means it was commonly colored white, but if it was made out of metal, then silver was used. This design was chosen to symbolize the long history of education in Volda–it was the site of the first secondary school outside of a major city in Norway. The arms were designed by Inge Rotevatn. The municipal flag has the same design as the coat of arms.

The current coat of arms was approved in 2019 for use starting on 1 January 2020 when Hornindal Municipality and part of Ørsta Municipality were added to Volda Municipality. The official blazon is "Azure, a downwards pointing fountain pen nib flanked by two scythes endorsed argent". This means the arms have a blue field (background) and the charge is the tip of a fountain pen with a scythe on each side. The charge has a tincture of argent which means it is commonly colored white, but if it is made out of metal, then silver is used. The arms from 1987 were modified by adding two scythes on either side of the tip of a fountain pen. The scythes were taken from the old arms of the former municipality of Hornindal. Hornindal historically had large numbers of smiths and their scythe production was well known in the wider region. The municipal flag has the same design as the coat of arms.

== History ==
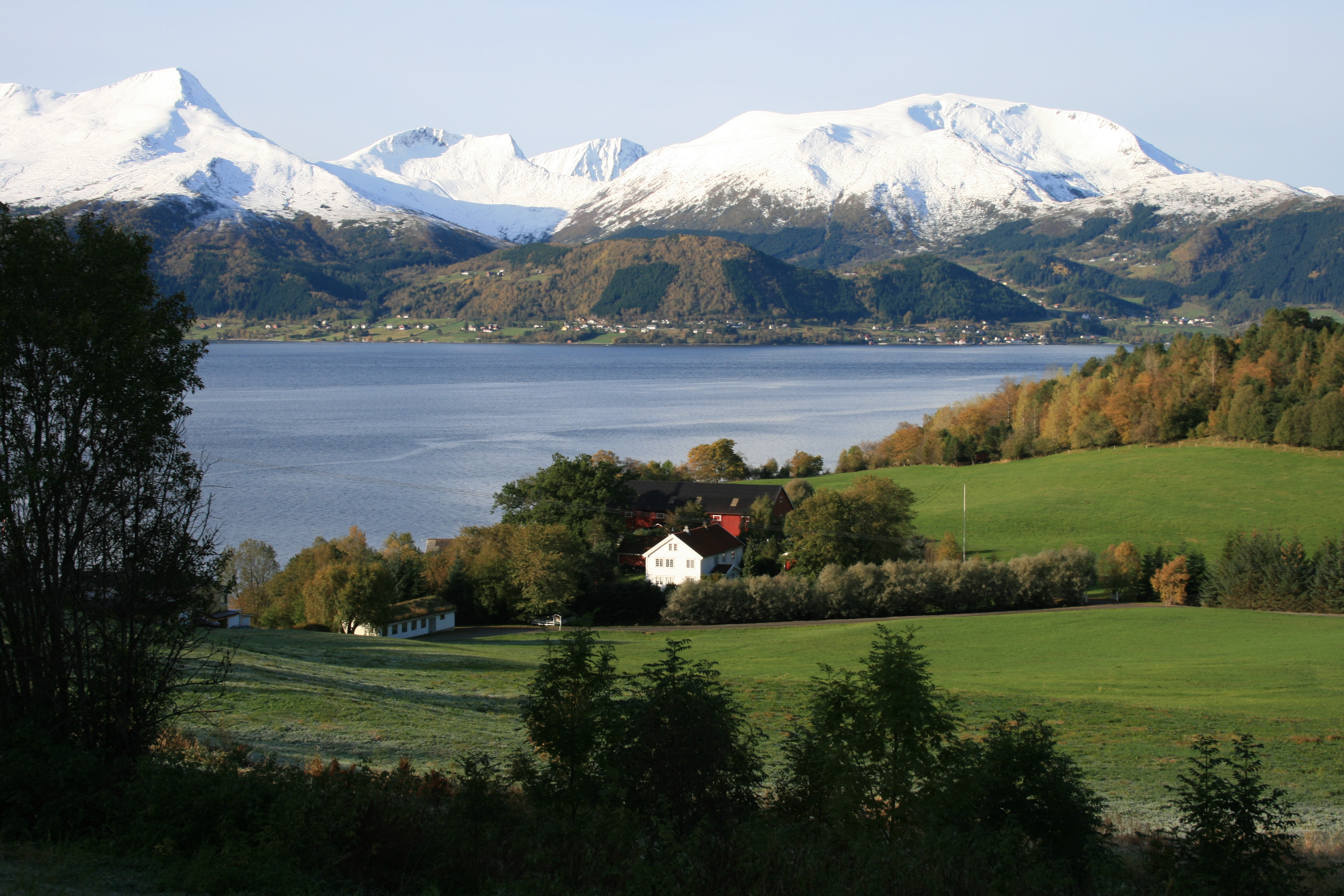
Farm of Sivert Aarflot. The Sivert Aarflot museum to the left.

The municipality of Volden was established on 1 January 1838 (see formannskapsdistrikt law). The original municipality was the same as the parish (prestegjeld) of Volden, including the sub-parishes of Ørsta and Dalsfjord. On 1 August 1883, the eastern sub-parish of Ørsta (population: 2,070) was separated from Volden to form the new Ørsta Municipality. This left Volden Municipality with 3,485 residents. On 1 January 1893, the Ytrestølen farm in Ørsta Municipality (population: 13) was transferred to Volden Municipality. In 1918, the name was changed from Volden Municipality to Volda Municipality.

On 1 July 1924, the western sub-parish of Dalsfjord (population: 960) was separated to become the new Dalsfjord Municipality. This left Volda Municipality with 4,715 residents. During the 1960s, there were many municipal mergers across Norway due to the work of the Schei Committee. On 1 January 1964, Dalsfjord Municipality (population: 1,151) and Volda Municipality (population: 6,056) were merged back together to form a new, larger Volda Municipality with 7,207 residents.

On 1 January 2020, another large municipal border adjustment took place. The neighboring Hornindal Municipality (previously in Sogn og Fjordane county) and the Bjørke and Leira areas of Ørsta Municipality were merged with Volda to make a much larger Volda Municipality (in Møre og Romsdal county).

== Culture ==
=== Churches ===
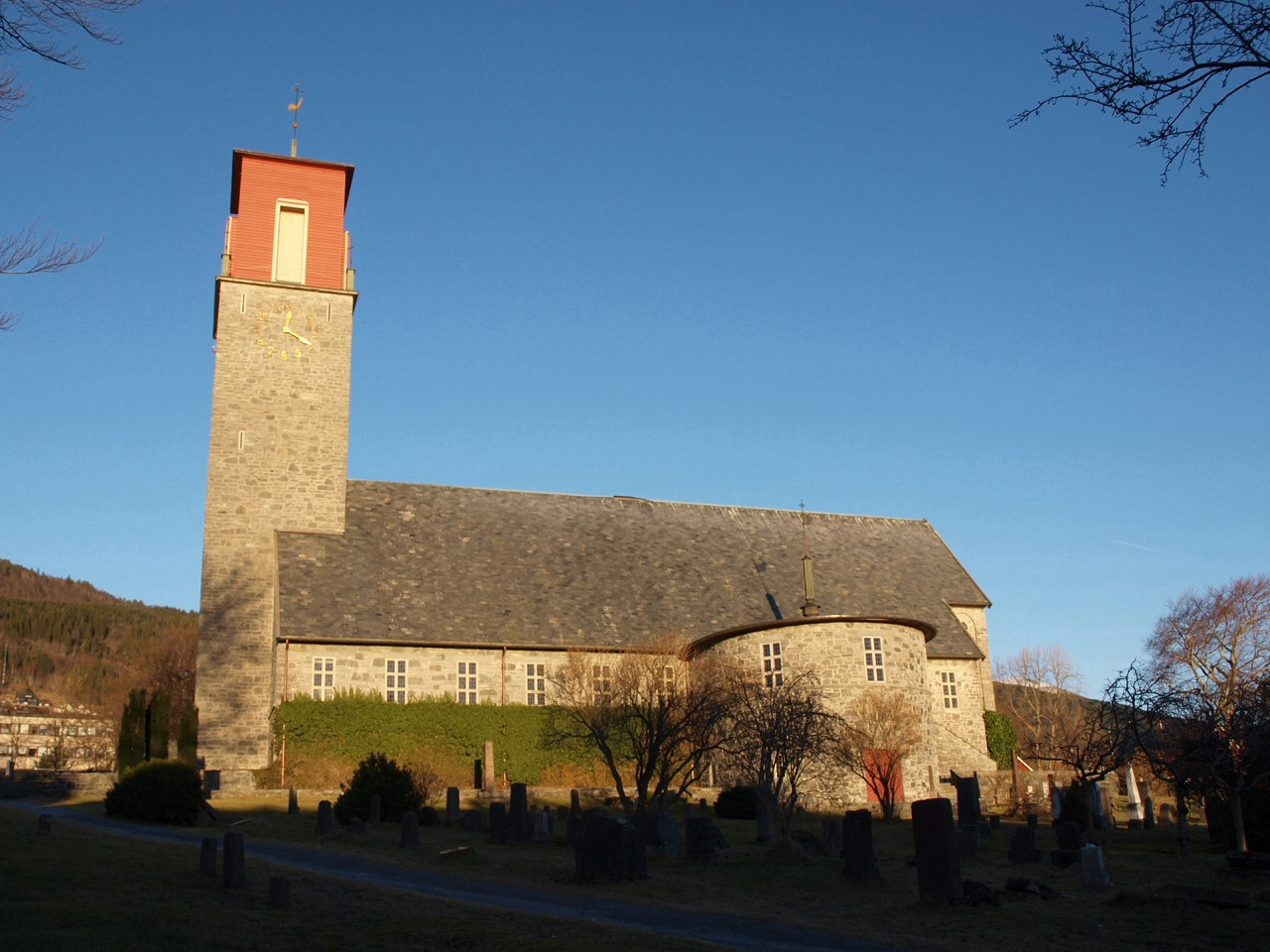
Volda Church

The Church of Norway has six parishes (sokn) within Volda Municipality. It is part of the Søre Sunnmøre prosti (deanery) in the Diocese of Møre.

Churches in Volda Municipality
Parish (sokn)	Church name	Location of the church	Year built
Austefjord	Austefjord Church	Fyrde	1773
Dalsfjord	Dalsfjord Church	Dravlaus	1910
Hornindal	Hornindal Church	Grodås	1856
Kilsfjord	Kilsfjord Church	Straumshamn	1974
Storfjorden	Bjørke Church	Bjørke	1919
Volda	Volda Church	Volda	1932

== Geography ==
Volda's main geographical feature is the Voldsfjorden which branches off into the Austefjorden, Kilsfjorden, and Dalsfjorden. It is also mountainous, particularly southeast of the fjords, with the Sunnmørsalpene mountains surrounding the region. The highest point in the municipality is the 1,700.32-metre (5,578.5 ft) tall mountain Kvitegga, located on the border with Stranda Municipality. The 1,482-metre (4,862 ft) tall mountain Eidskyrkja is located in the southeastern part of the municipality.

Vanylven Municipality lies to the west, Herøy Municipality and Ulstein Municipality lie to the north (across the Rovdefjorden), Ørsta Municipality lies to the north, Stryn Municipality (in Vestland county) lies to the southeast, and Stad Municipality (in Vestland county) lies to the south.

The dominant centre, both in terms of population and administration, is the village of Volda, in the northwesternmost part of the municipality. Other population concentrations include Mork, Ekset, Folkestad, Fyrde, Steinsvika, Lauvstad, Bjørkedal, Grodås, and Straumshamn.

Some of the mountains in Volda include Hornindalsrokken, Kvitegga, and Jakta.

== Climate ==
For more updated climate data, the Ørsta-Volda airport located midway between the two towns has a weather station, see Ørsta municipality.

Climate data for Volda (21 m) 1961-1990
Month	Jan	Feb	Mar	Apr	May	Jun	Jul	Aug	Sep	Oct	Nov	Dec	Year
Daily mean °C (°F)	−0.5 (31.1)	−0.1 (31.8)	2.0 (35.6)	4.4 (39.9)	9.2 (48.6)	12.0 (53.6)	13.3 (55.9)	13.2 (55.8)	9.9 (49.8)	7.3 (45.1)	2.5 (36.5)	0.4 (32.7)	6.1 (43.0)
Average precipitation mm (inches)	175 (6.9)	140 (5.5)	150 (5.9)	110 (4.3)	85 (3.3)	95 (3.7)	125 (4.9)	155 (6.1)	265 (10.4)	251 (9.9)	240 (9.4)	234 (9.2)	2,025 (79.5)
Source: Yr.no history

== Government ==
Volda Municipality is responsible for primary education (through 10th grade), outpatient health services, senior citizen services, welfare and other social services, zoning, economic development, and municipal roads and utilities. The municipality is governed by a municipal council of directly elected representatives. The mayor is indirectly elected by a vote of the municipal council. The municipality is under the jurisdiction of the Sunnmøre District Court and the Frostating Court of Appeal.

=== Municipal council ===
The municipal council (Kommunestyre) of Volda Municipality is made up of 33 representatives that are elected to four year terms. The tables below show the current and historical composition of the council by political party.

Volda kommunestyre 2023–2027
Party name (in Nynorsk)	Number of representatives
Labour Party (Arbeidarpartiet)	5
Progress Party (Framstegspartiet)	4
Green Party (Miljøpartiet Dei Grøne)	1
Conservative Party (Høgre)	5
Industry and Business Party (Industri‑ og Næringspartiet)	2
Christian Democratic Party (Kristeleg Folkeparti)	3
Red Party (Raudt)	1
Centre Party (Senterpartiet)	7
Socialist Left Party (Sosialistisk Venstreparti)	4
Liberal Party (Venstre)	1
Total number of members:	33

Volda kommunestyre 2019–2023
Party name (in Nynorsk)	Number of representatives
Labour Party (Arbeidarpartiet)	4
Progress Party (Framstegspartiet)	2
Green Party (Miljøpartiet Dei Grøne)	2
Conservative Party (Høgre)	6
Christian Democratic Party (Kristeleg Folkeparti)	3
Red Party (Raudt)	1
Centre Party (Senterpartiet)	7
Socialist Left Party (Sosialistisk Venstreparti)	3
Liberal Party (Venstre)	2
Volda List (Voldalista)	3
Total number of members:	33
Note: On 1 January 2020, Hornindal Municipality and part of Ørsta Municipality were merged into Volda Municipality.

Volda kommunestyre 2015–2019
Party name (in Nynorsk)	Number of representatives
Labour Party (Arbeidarpartiet)	6
Progress Party (Framstegspartiet)	4
Green Party (Miljøpartiet Dei Grøne)	1
Conservative Party (Høgre)	3
Christian Democratic Party (Kristeleg Folkeparti)	6
Centre Party (Senterpartiet)	3
Socialist Left Party (Sosialistisk Venstreparti)	2
Liberal Party (Venstre)	2
Total number of members:	27

Volda kommunestyre 2011–2015
Party name (in Nynorsk)	Number of representatives
Labour Party (Arbeidarpartiet)	4
Progress Party (Framstegspartiet)	4
Conservative Party (Høgre)	4
Christian Democratic Party (Kristeleg Folkeparti)	5
Centre Party (Senterpartiet)	3
Socialist Left Party (Sosialistisk Venstreparti)	2
Liberal Party (Venstre)	3
Ferry list (Ferjelista)	2
Total number of members:	27

Volda kommunestyre 2007–2011
Party name (in Nynorsk)	Number of representatives
Labour Party (Arbeidarpartiet)	4
Progress Party (Framstegspartiet)	5
Conservative Party (Høgre)	3
Christian Democratic Party (Kristeleg Folkeparti)	5
Centre Party (Senterpartiet)	5
Socialist Left Party (Sosialistisk Venstreparti)	3
Liberal Party (Venstre)	2
Total number of members:	27

Volda kommunestyre 2003–2007
Party name (in Nynorsk)	Number of representatives
Labour Party (Arbeidarpartiet)	3
Progress Party (Framstegspartiet)	3
Conservative Party (Høgre)	5
Christian Democratic Party (Kristeleg Folkeparti)	5
Centre Party (Senterpartiet)	4
Socialist Left Party (Sosialistisk Venstreparti)	5
Liberal Party (Venstre)	2
Total number of members:	27

Volda kommunestyre 1999–2003
Party name (in Nynorsk)	Number of representatives
Labour Party (Arbeidarpartiet)	4
Progress Party (Framstegspartiet)	1
Conservative Party (Høgre)	10
Christian Democratic Party (Kristeleg Folkeparti)	7
Centre Party (Senterpartiet)	6
Socialist Left Party (Sosialistisk Venstreparti)	4
Liberal Party (Venstre)	3
Total number of members:	35

Volda kommunestyre 1995–1999
Party name (in Nynorsk)	Number of representatives
Labour Party (Arbeidarpartiet)	4
Progress Party (Framstegspartiet)	1
Conservative Party (Høgre)	8
Christian Democratic Party (Kristeleg Folkeparti)	7
Centre Party (Senterpartiet)	7
Socialist Left Party (Sosialistisk Venstreparti)	3
Liberal Party (Venstre)	4
Centrum List (Sentrumslista)	1
Total number of members:	35

Volda kommunestyre 1991–1995
Party name (in Nynorsk)	Number of representatives
Labour Party (Arbeidarpartiet)	5
Progress Party (Framstegspartiet)	1
Conservative Party (Høgre)	7
Christian Democratic Party (Kristeleg Folkeparti)	7
Centre Party (Senterpartiet)	7
Socialist Left Party (Sosialistisk Venstreparti)	4
Liberal Party (Venstre)	3
Cross-party list for the west side of the Voldsfjorden (Tverrpolitisk liste for vestsida av Voldsfjorden)	1
Total number of members:	35

Volda kommunestyre 1987–1991
Party name (in Nynorsk)	Number of representatives
Labour Party (Arbeidarpartiet)	6
Conservative Party (Høgre)	8
Christian Democratic Party (Kristeleg Folkeparti)	6
Centre Party (Senterpartiet)	4
Socialist Left Party (Sosialistisk Venstreparti)	2
Liberal Party (Venstre)	6
Kindergarten List (Barnehagelista)	1
Non-party election list for the west side of the Voldsfjorden (Upolitisk valliste for Vestsida av Voldsfjorden)	2
Total number of members:	35

Volda kommunestyre 1983–1987
Party name (in Nynorsk)	Number of representatives
Labour Party (Arbeidarpartiet)	6
Conservative Party (Høgre)	5
Christian Democratic Party (Kristeleg Folkeparti)	8
Centre Party (Senterpartiet)	6
Socialist Left Party (Sosialistisk Venstreparti)	2
Liberal Party (Venstre)	5
Non-party election list for the west side of the Voldafjord (Upolitisk valliste for Vestsida av Voldafjorden)	3
Total number of members:	35

Volda kommunestyre 1979–1983
Party name (in Nynorsk)	Number of representatives
Labour Party (Arbeidarpartiet)	4
Conservative Party (Høgre)	6
Christian Democratic Party (Kristeleg Folkeparti)	7
Centre Party (Senterpartiet)	6
Socialist Left Party (Sosialistisk Venstreparti)	1
Liberal Party (Venstre)	6
Election list for Dravlausbygda and Innselset area (Valliste for Dravlausbygda og Innselset krins)	1
Local list for Lid and Yksnøy (Krinsliste for Lid og Yksnøy)	1
Non-party list for the Mork area (Upolitisk liste for Mork krins)	1
Non-party list for the west side of the Voldsfjorden (Upolitisk liste for Vestsida av Voldsfjorden)	2
Total number of members:	35

Volda kommunestyre 1975–1979
Party name (in Nynorsk)	Number of representatives
Labour Party (Arbeidarpartiet)	5
Conservative Party (Høgre)	3
Christian Democratic Party (Kristeleg Folkeparti)	8
New People's Party (Nye Folkepartiet)	1
Centre Party (Senterpartiet)	8
Socialist Left Party (Sosialistisk Venstreparti)	1
Liberal Party (Venstre)	6
Election list for Mork (Valliste for Mork)	1
Local list for Lid og Yksnøy (Krinsliste for Lid og Yksnøy)	1
Non-party election list for Folkestad, Høydal, Fylsvik and the Bjørkedal area (Upolitisk Valliste for Folkestad, Høydal, Fylsvik og Bjørkedal Krins)	1
Total number of members:	35

Volda kommunestyre 1971–1975
Party name (in Nynorsk)	Number of representatives
Labour Party (Arbeidarpartiet)	6
Conservative Party (Høgre)	2
Christian Democratic Party (Kristeleg Folkeparti)	7
Centre Party (Senterpartiet)	10
Liberal Party (Venstre)	8
Local List(s) (Lokale lister)	2
Total number of members:	35

Volda kommunestyre 1967–1971
Party name (in Nynorsk)	Number of representatives
Labour Party (Arbeidarpartiet)	7
Conservative Party (Høgre)	3
Christian Democratic Party (Kristeleg Folkeparti)	6
Centre Party (Senterpartiet)	7
Liberal Party (Venstre)	9
Local List(s) (Lokale lister)	3
Total number of members:	35

Volda kommunestyre 1963–1967
Party name (in Nynorsk)	Number of representatives
Labour Party (Arbeidarpartiet)	6
Conservative Party (Høgre)	2
Christian Democratic Party (Kristeleg Folkeparti)	5
Centre Party (Senterpartiet)	6
Liberal Party (Venstre)	8
Local List(s) (Lokale lister)	8
Total number of members:	35
Note: On 1 January 1964, Dalsfjord Municipality became part of Volda Municipality.

Volda heradsstyre 1959–1963
Party name (in Nynorsk)	Number of representatives
Labour Party (Arbeidarpartiet)	4
Conservative Party (Høgre)	1
Centre Party (Senterpartiet)	2
Liberal Party (Venstre)	5
Local List(s) (Lokale lister)	15
Total number of members:	27

Volda heradsstyre 1955–1959
Party name (in Nynorsk)	Number of representatives
Labour Party (Arbeidarpartiet)	4
Conservative Party (Høgre)	1
Christian Democratic Party (Kristeleg Folkeparti)	3
Farmers' Party (Bondepartiet)	2
Liberal Party (Venstre)	4
Local List(s) (Lokale lister)	13
Total number of members:	27

Volda heradsstyre 1951–1955
Party name (in Nynorsk)	Number of representatives
Labour Party (Arbeidarpartiet)	3
Local List(s) (Lokale lister)	21
Total number of members:	24

Volda heradsstyre 1947–1951
Party name (in Nynorsk)	Number of representatives
Labour Party (Arbeidarpartiet)	4
Local List(s) (Lokale lister)	20
Total number of members:	24

Volda heradsstyre 1945–1947
Party name (in Nynorsk)	Number of representatives
Labour Party (Arbeidarpartiet)	6
Joint List(s) of Non-Socialist Parties (Borgarlege Felleslister)	1
Local List(s) (Lokale lister)	17
Total number of members:	24

Volda heradsstyre 1937–1941*
Party name (in Nynorsk)	Number of representatives
Labour Party (Arbeidarpartiet)	6
Local List(s) (Lokale lister)	18
Total number of members:	24
Note: Due to the German occupation of Norway during World War II, no elections were held for new municipal councils until after the war ended in 1945.

=== Mayors ===
The mayor (Nynorsk: ordførar) of Volda Municipality is the political leader of the municipality and the chairperson of the municipal council. Here is a list of people who have held this position:

- 1838–1839: Sjur H. Halkjelsvik
- 1840–1841: Peder E. Schjelderup
- 1842–1845: Sjur H. Halkjelsvik
- 1846–1849: Anders Velle
- 1850–1857: Mauritz Aarflot (V)
- 1858–1859: Rasmus R. Aarflot
- 1860–1885: Mauritz Aarflot (V)
- 1886–1887: Rasmus R. Aarflot
- 1888–1889: Rasmus Barstad
- 1890–1893: Rasmus Mork
- 1894–1904: Laurits Barstad
- 1905–1910: Oscar Normann Eng (V)
- 1911–1913: Anders Vassbotn (V)
- 1914–1916: Ola S. Rotevatn
- 1917–1919: Henrik Kårstad (V)
- 1920–1931: Ola S. Rotevatn (Bp)
- 1932–1934: Ola Drabløs
- 1935–1937: Ola R. Heltne
- 1938–1941: Johan Alvestad (Ap)
- 1941–1945: Maurits Aarflot (NS)
- 1945–1945: Johan Alvestad (Ap)
- 1946–1946: Ola Drabløs
- 1946–1947: Georg Rønnestad (Ap)
- 1947–1947: Henrik Driveklepp
- 1948–1951: Martin Dahl (V)
- 1952–1955: Johannes Nes (V)
- 1956–1959: Per Longva (Ap)
- 1960–1967: Karl Alme (V)
- 1968–1975: Sigurd H. Halkjelsvik (Sp)
- 1976–1979: Eilert Bø (KrF)
- 1980–1987: Rasmus R. Aarflot (Sp)
- 1988–2003: Knut Bere (H)
- 2003–2011: Ragnhild Aarflot Kalland (Sp)
- 2011–2015: Arild Iversen (KrF)
- 2015–2019: Jørgen Amdam (Ap)
- 2019–present: Sølvi Dimmen (Sp)

== Culture ==
Volda is primarily known for strong cultural heritage and academic traditions. A private library at Egset, the first rural of its kind in Norway, is said to have inspired the young Ivar Aasen in the 19th century. Martin Ulvestad, Norwegian–American author who published an English-Danish-Norwegian dictionary in 1895, (Engelsk-Dansk-Norsk Ordbog med fuldstændig Udtalebetegnelse) was born in Volda. The Norsk Landboeblad newspaper was based in Volda in the 1800s. Volda landsgymnas (established 1910) was the first Norwegian secondary school outside a major city. Among the most important institutions today is the Volda University College.

Volda University College (HVO) is one of 25 university colleges in Norway. HVO, with an enrollment of about 3,000 students, specializes in education of teachers, animators, and journalists. This has attracted or incubated several animation companies to Volda, whose work is highlighted in the annual Animation Volda Festival, which started at HVO in 2007. HVO is host of the annual Norwegian Documentary Film Festival (a.k.a. DOKFILM), which started in 1997.

The national ski festival X2 is also held in Volda during April every year.

The Volda TI sports club includes an association football team, whose home field is Volda Stadion. The football squad has consistently played in the 2. divisjon to 4. divisjon leagues (tiers three to five of the Norwegian football league system) for a number of decades.

As a logical consequence of the huge influx of students, as well as a county hospital, public services are by far the most dominant sector, representing almost 50% of economic life in Volda. Industry and agriculture are also prevalent. Bjørkedalen is noted for its tradition in building wooden boats.

The Sivert Aarflot Museum is located at Ekset in Volda. Volda and its environs are featured prominently in the film Troll Hunter (2010).

== Transportation ==
The Ørsta–Volda Airport, Hovden, is located Ørsta Municipality, just north of the village of Volda. The European route E39 highway passes north through the municipality on its way to the city of Ålesund. As noted, the municipality is criss-crossed by fjords; therefore, both Lauvstad and Folkestad are linked to the population centre Volda by ferry. In February 2008, the underwater Eiksund Tunnel connected the island municipalities of Ulstein, Hareid, Herøy, and Sande to the mainland municipalities of Ørsta and Volda. The tunnel is the deepest undersea tunnel in the world. The Kviven Tunnel was completed in 2012, connecting Fyrde to the village of Grodås to the south on the other side of a large mountain. This tunnel led to the old Hornindal Municipality becoming part of Volda Municipality in 2020.

== Notable people ==
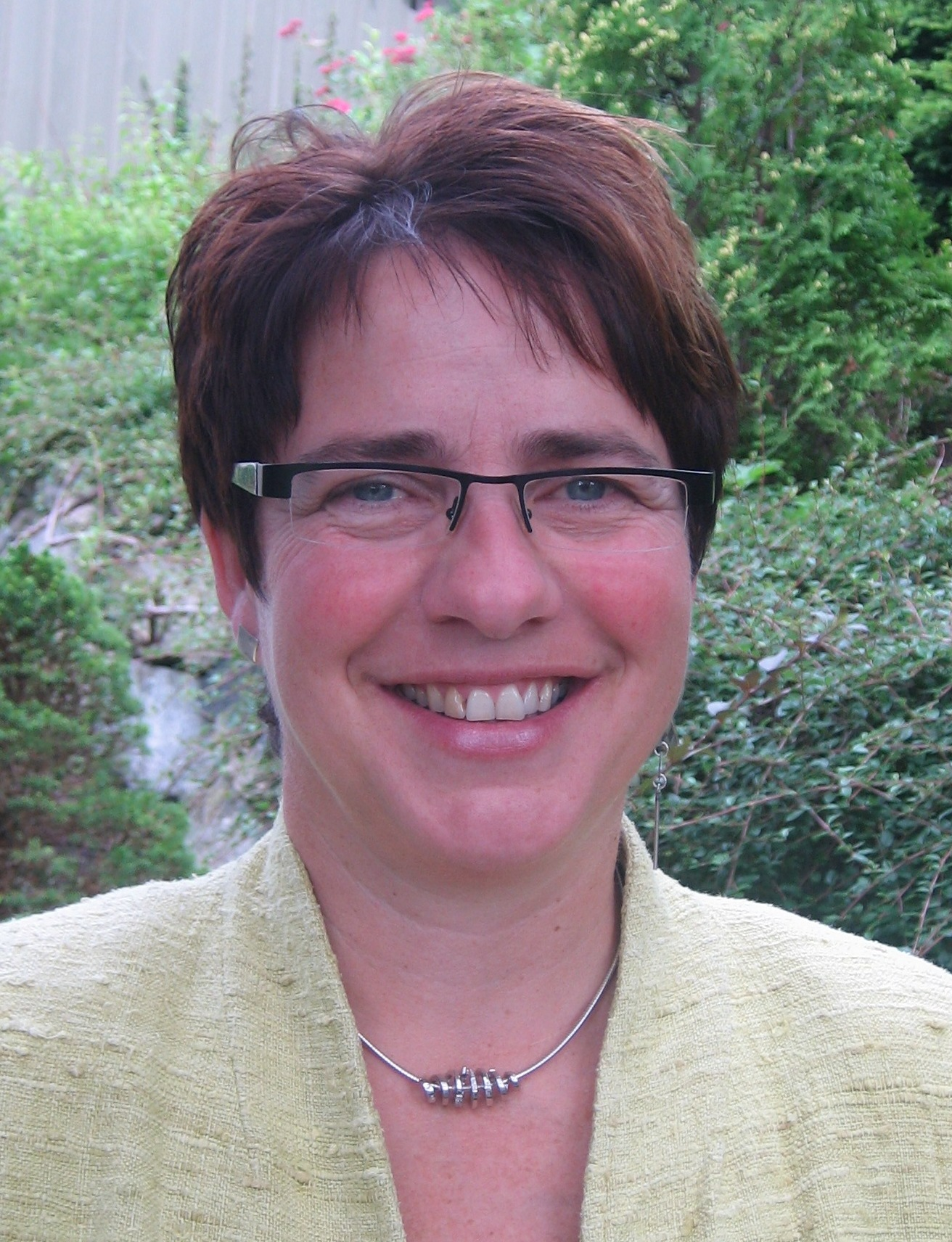
Ragnhild Aarflot Kalland, 2007

- Martin Ulvestad (1865–1942), a Norwegian-American historian and philologist
- Peter Olai Thorvik (1873–1965), a blacksmith, fisherman, banker, and politician
- Inger Hagerup (1905–1985), an author, playwright and poet who lived in Volda
- Dag Frøland (1945–2010), a comedian, revue artist, singer and impersonator
- Ottar Grepstad (born 1953), a Norwegian Nynorsk writer who lives in Volda
- Olav Rune Ekeland Bastrup (born 1956), a writer and historian
- Ragnhild Aarflot Kalland (born 1960), a local politician and mayor of Volda from 2003-2011
- Frode Grodås (born 1964), a football goalkeeper with over 250 club caps and 50 for Norway
- Simone Eriksrud (born 1970), a musician, composer, and lead vocalist with D'Sound
- Asbjørn Blokkum Flø (born 1973), a composer, musician, and sound artist
- Beate S. Lech (born 1974), a jazz vocalist and lead singer of Beady Belle
- Erlend Slettevoll (born 1981), a jazz pianist
- Jon Georg Dale (born 1984), a Progress Party politician and former government minister
- Ørjan Håskjold Nyland (born 1990), a football goalkeeper with over 200 club caps and 28 for Norway

== Media gallery ==
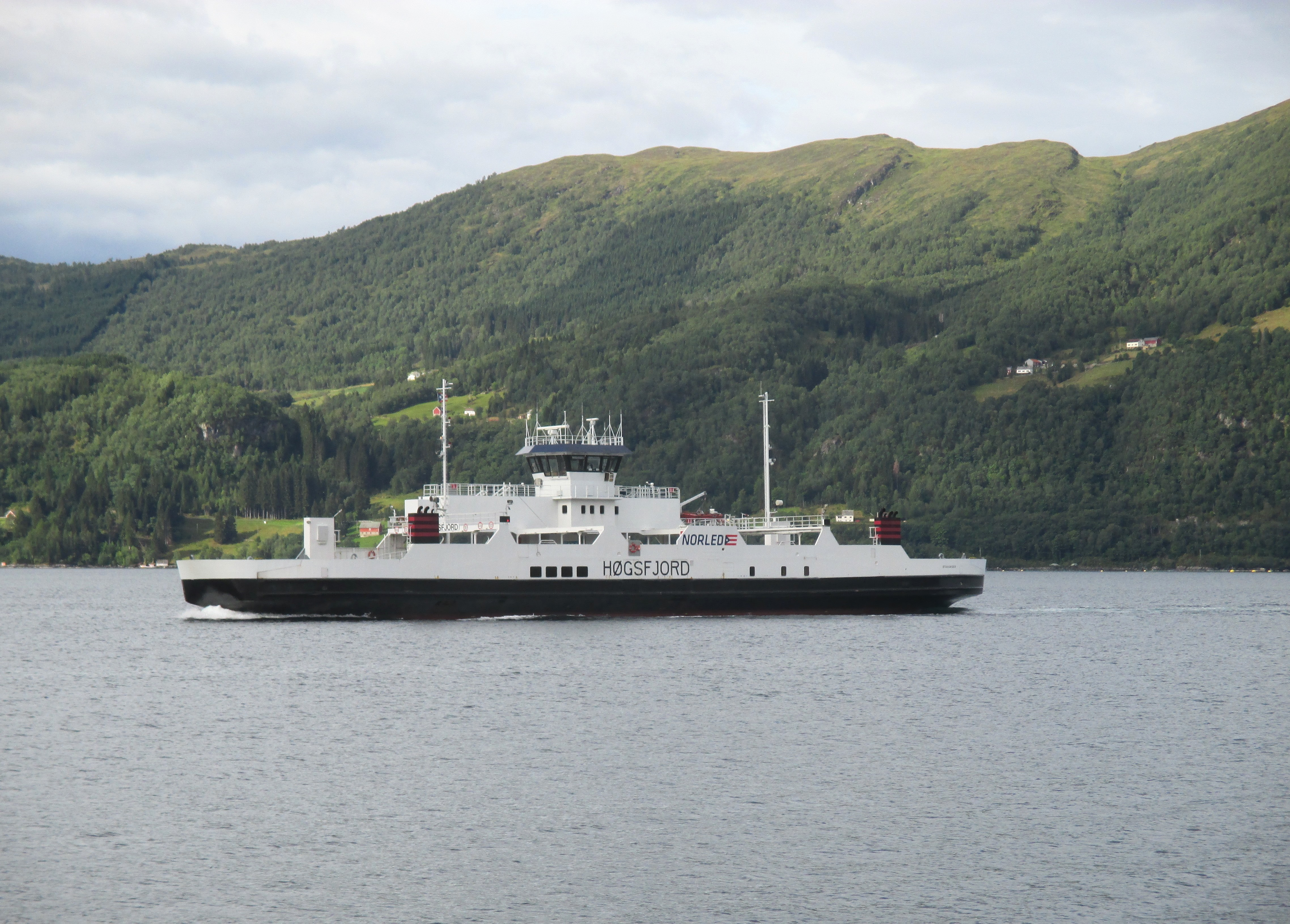
MF Høgsfjord outside of the Volda ferry quay

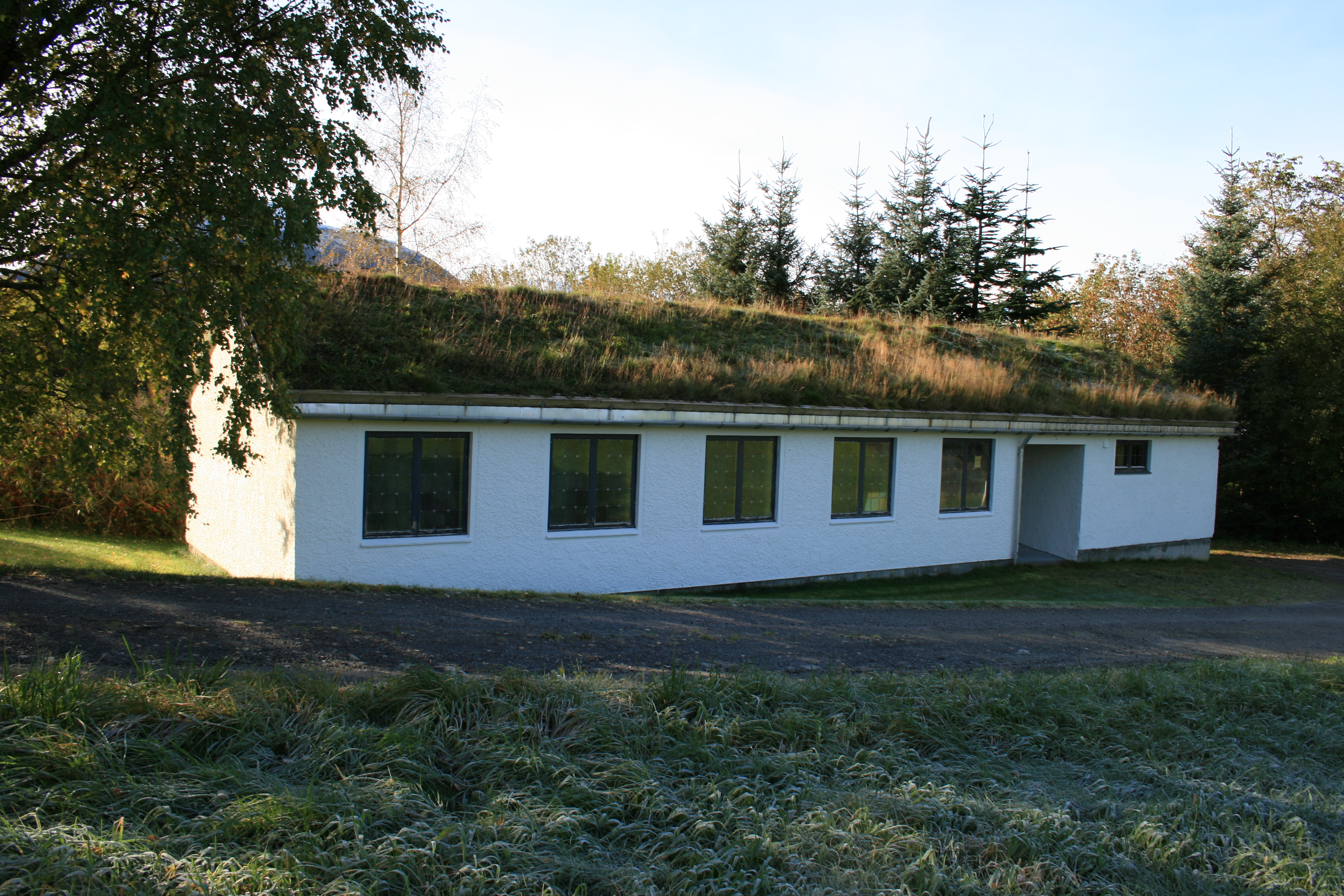
Sivert Aarflot Museum in Volda

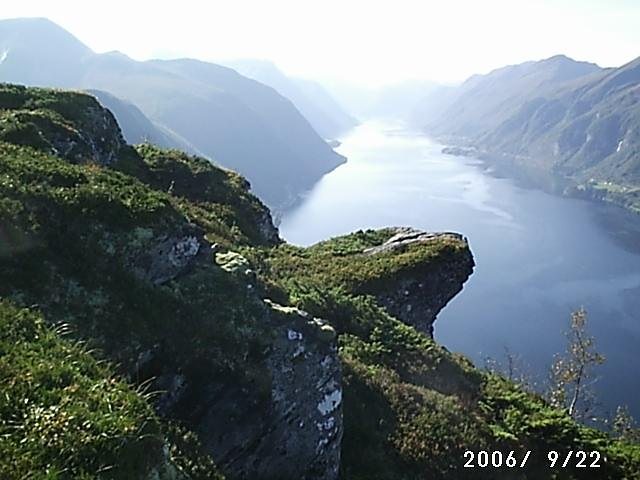
Fjellnabben Galten in Dalsfjorden

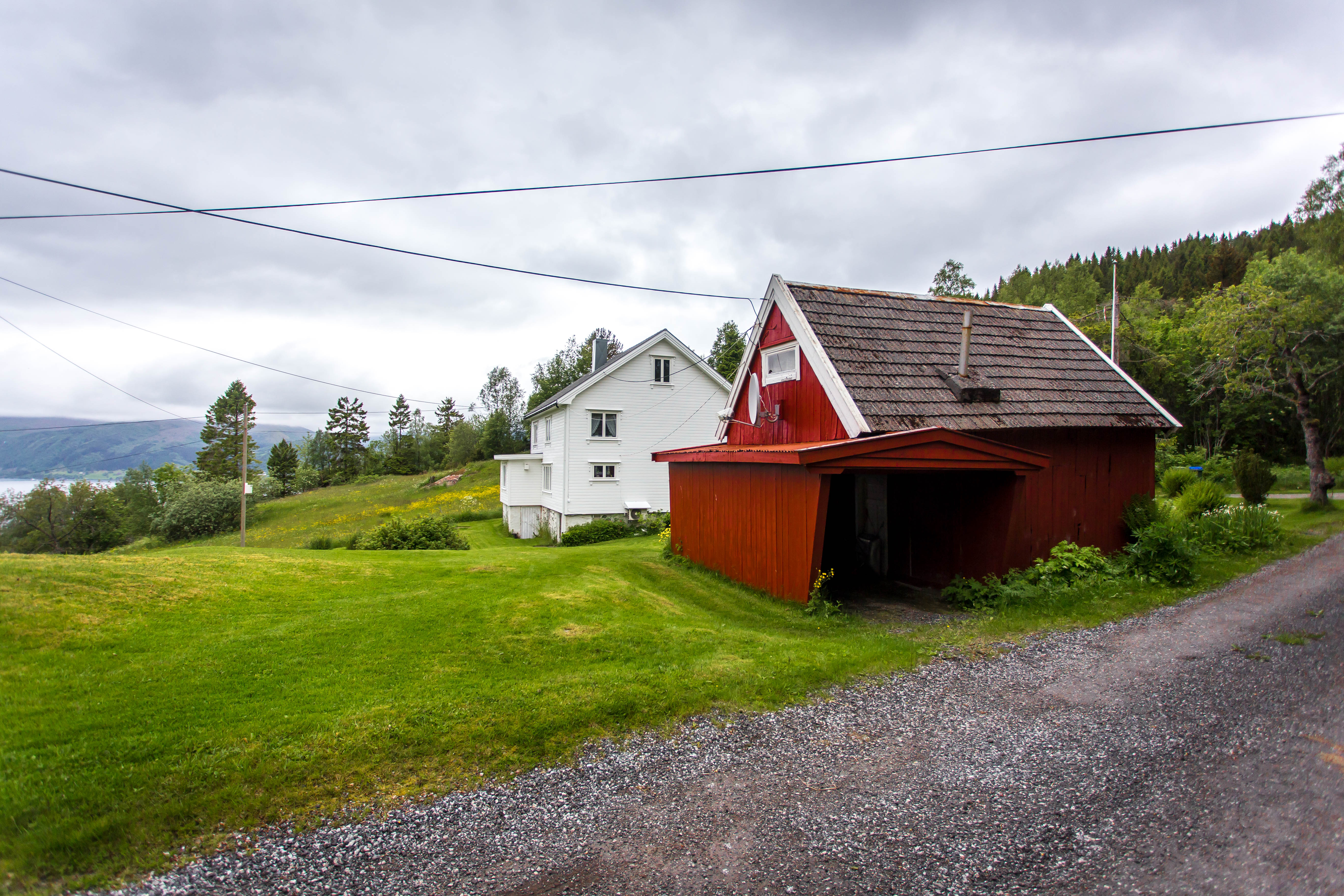
View of Eikrem
