= Sivert Aarflot Museum =

Museum in Norway

Coordinates: 62°9′44.54″N 6°1′51.01″E

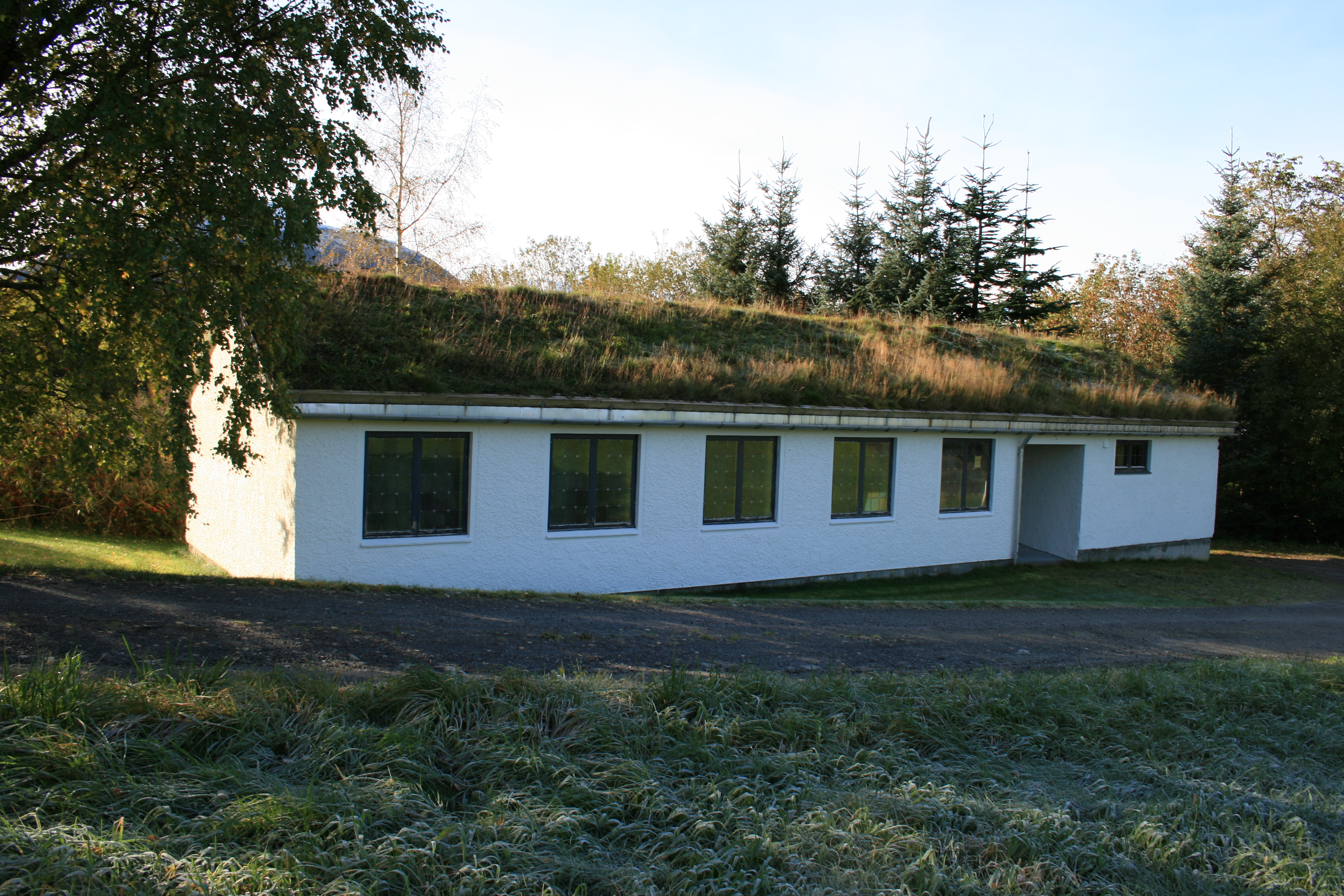
Sivert Aarflot Museum

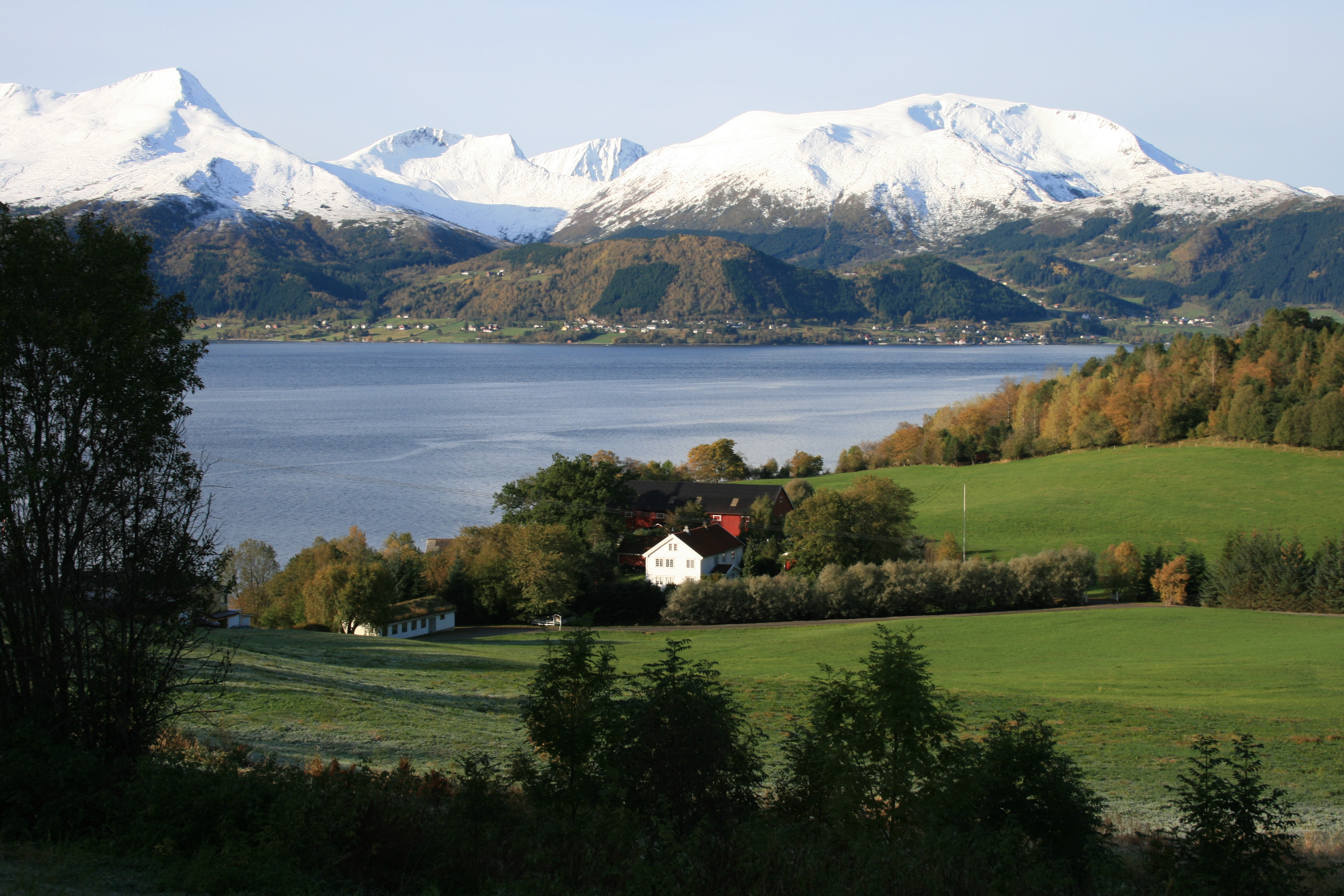
The Nedre Ekset farm in Volda, which Sivert Aarflot purchased in 1798. The Sivert Aarflot Museum stands to the left

The Sivert Aarflot Museum (Norwegian: Sivert Aarflot-museet) is a division of the Sunnmøre Museum Foundation in Norway. The museum is named after Sivert Aarflot (1759–1817), who among other things started the first rural printing shop in Norway. The Sivert Aarflot Museum has a permanent exhibition in the museum building at the farm in Ekset in Volda Municipality, where Sivert Aarflot lived. Among other items, the collection includes printing equipment.
