= Mauritz Aarflot =

Norwegian politician (1821–1904)

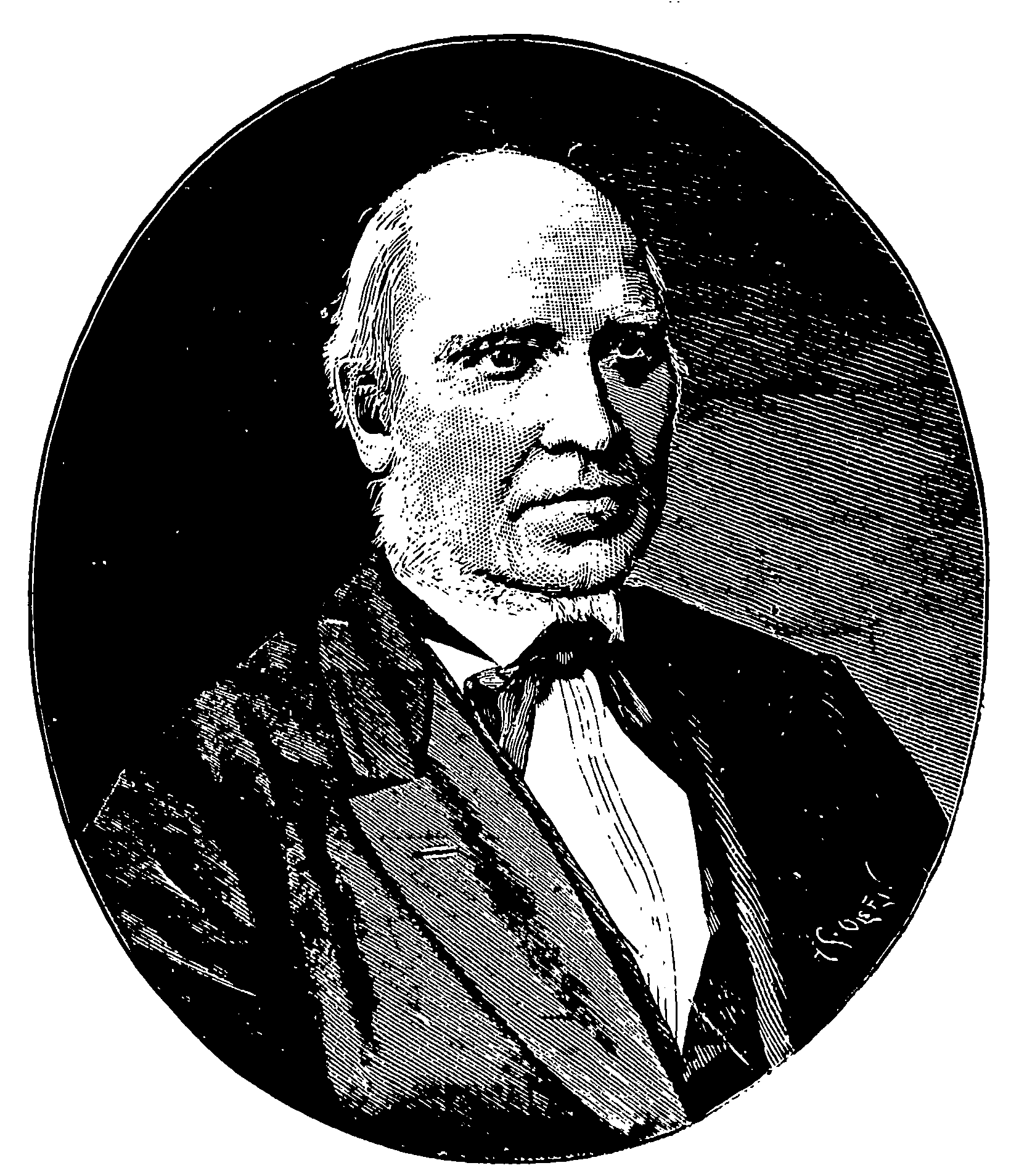
Mauritz Aarflot (1821–1904)

Mauritz Andreas Aarflot (April 13, 1821 – March 4, 1904) was a Norwegian editor and member of the Storting.

Aarflot was the son of the editor and lensmann in Volda Rasmus Aarflot (1792–1845). He continued his father's printing activity and published the newspapers Postbudet for Landalmuen (1845–68), Norsk landbrugstidende (1848–55), and Ugebladet (1888–1902). Aarflot represented Romsdal County in the Storting from 1854 to 1888, where he was continually an ally of Johan Sverdrup. In 1882, Aarflot published the work Odelsbonden om Grundloven i dens Hovedbestemmelser (The Allodial Farmer Regarding the Constitution in Its Main Provisions), which was an attempt to respond to the opinion expressed by the faculty of law on the king's right of refusal in constitutional matters.
