= Rasmus Aarflot =

Norwegian politician

Rasmus Sivertsen Aarflot (January 17, 1792 – January 19, 1845) was a Norwegian lensmann, editor, and member of the Storting.

Rasmus Aarflot was the son of the lensmann and community educator Sivert Aarflot, and the brother of the writer Berte Canutte Aarflot. He was the first postmaster in Volda, and starting in 1816 its lensmann. Rasmus Aarflot took over his father's print shop and published various periodicals to promote community education (e.g., Norsk Landboeblad). He represented Romsdal County in the Storting in 1824, 1827–1828, 1833, and 1839. He was also elected in 1845, but died before serving. Rasmus Aarflot was a close acquaintance of the philologist Ivar Aasen; it was through Aarflot's book collection that the young Aasen had access to his first reading material.

Rasmus Aarflot was the father of the editor and Storting member Mauritz Aarflot (1821–1904).
