= Martin Ulvestad =

Norwegian-American writer (1865–1942)

Martin Ulvestad (24 December 1865 – 19 January 1942) was a Norwegian-born American historian and author whose writings focused on Norwegian-American immigration. He was a pioneer in documenting the early history of Norwegian settlers in America.

== Biography ==
Ole Johannes Martinus Ulvestad was born in Volda Municipality in Møre og Romsdal, Norway. He was the son of Peder Olsen Ulvestad (1825–1918) and Alexandrine Knudsdatter (1824–1894). He immigrated to the United States in 1886. During his next three to four years, he worked as a book printer and as a typesetter for various English, German and Scandinavian language newspapers.

Ulvestad published an English-Danish-Norwegian dictionary in 1895. Ulvestad subsequently collected and published extensive information regarding Norwegian-American immigration and settlement in North America. His books provided biographical information, history of the settlements associated with Norwegian immigration and information regarding those who fought in the American Civil War. These books also contained articles about Norwegian music in America, listing of newspapers and magazines, and Norwegian-American educational institutions. His most notable work was the two volume Nordmaendene i Amerika published in 1907 and 1913. The narrative portion of Nordmændene i Amerika was subsequently translated into English by Olaf Kringhaug (1928–2008).

== Personal life ==
In 1915, Martin Ulvestad was honorary vice president of the Norwegian American exhibition at the Panama Pacific Exposition in San Francisco, California. Ulestad was presented with the Knight's Cross, First Class, of the Royal Norwegian Order of St. Olav, for his dedicated work in collecting and publishing these material. Ulvestad was knighted by Haakon VII of Norway with the Order of St. Olav in 1923.

In 1893, Ulvestad married Gertrude Myklebust (1861–1900) who had also immigrated from Norway. They had one son. After her death, Ulvestad remarried in 1901 to Hannah Oss, Gertrude's cousin and also a Norwegian immigrant. They had six children. Martin Ulvestad died in Seattle, Washington in 1942.

== Selected bibliography ==
- Engelsk-Dansk-Norsk Ordbog med fuldstændig Udtalebetegnelse (1895)
- Nordmaendene i Amerika: Deres Historie og Rekord (1907)
- Nordmaendene I Amerika, 2den Del (1913)
- Norsk-Amerikaneren (1930)
