= Dalsfjord Church =

Church in Møre og Romsdal, Norway

- Dalsfjord kyrkje
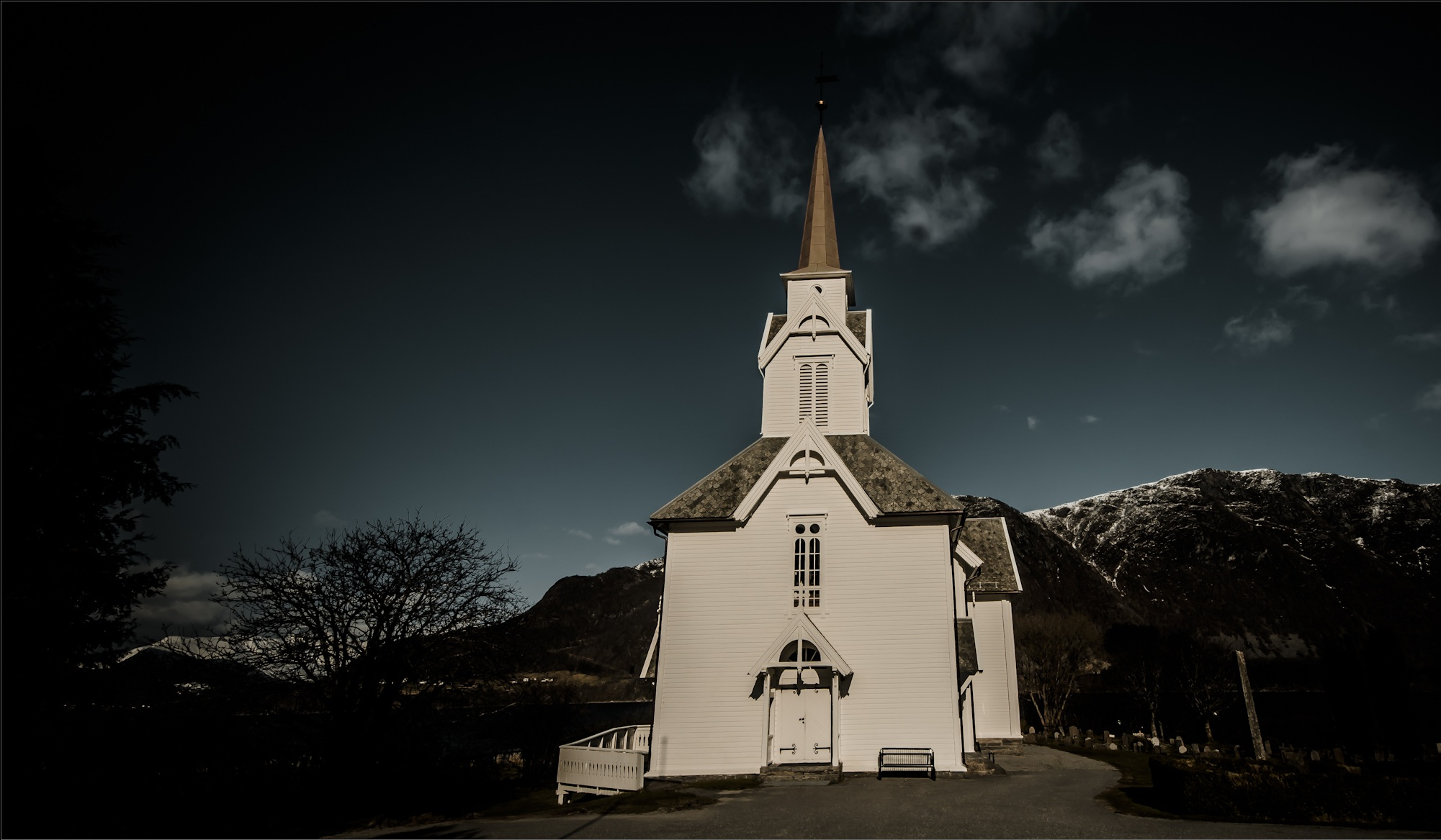
- View of the church
- Dalsfjord Church
- 62.12442621289°N 5.9437496960°E
- Location: Volda, Møre og Romsdal
- Country: Norway
- Denomination: Church of Norway
- Churchmanship: Evangelical Lutheran

History
- Status: Parish church
- Founded: 1910
- Consecrated: 29 December 1910

Architecture
- Functional status: Active
- Architect: Ole Havnæs
- Architectural type: Cruciform
- Groundbreaking: February 1910
- Completed: 1910 (116 years ago)

Specifications
- Capacity: 400
- Materials: Wood

Administration
- Diocese: Møre bispedømme
- Deanery: Søre Sunnmøre prosti
- Parish: Dalsfjord
- Norwegian Cultural Heritage Site
- Type: Church
- Status: Not protected
- ID: 84020

Dalsfjord Church (Norwegian: Dalsfjord kyrkje) is a parish church of the Church of Norway in Volda Municipality in Møre og Romsdal county, Norway. It is located in the village of Dravlaus, on the western shore of the Dalsfjorden. It is the church for the Dalsfjord parish which is part of the Søre Sunnmøre prosti (deanery) in the Diocese of Møre. The white, wooden church was built in a cruciform design in 1910 using plans drawn up by the architect Ole Havnæs. The church seats about 400 people. The building was consecrated by the Bishop Johan Willoch Erichsen.

== History ==
Dalsfjord did not have a church during the Middle Ages so the people of the Dalsfjord area used the main Volda Church that was located about 10 kilometres (6.2 mi) away, on the other side of the fjord. It is said, however, that a wooden cross had been erected on the site during the Middle Ages, and that in Catholic times (pre-Reformation) this site was a gathering place for people. Sometimes the priest showed up at this site and held Mass in the open air. This may have happened even after the Reformation in Norway.

When the nearby Austefjord Chapel was built in 1879, the people of Dalsfjord noticed and began to push for their own chapel and cemetery. This plan was rejected a couple of times, but after years of struggle, Dalsfjord was separated from Volda as a separate parish on 1 January 1910. After gaining parish status, the planning for a new church began. The foundation stone for the new church was laid in February 1910. The church was designed by Ole Havnæs and the lead builders were Petter Strømme and Jens Strømsheim. The building was a timber-framed cruciform church. Dalsfjord Church was consecrated on 29 December 1910. The exterior was originally painted yellow, but later it was repainted in white. The church was extensively renovated in 1963.

== See also ==
- List of churches in Møre
