= Dalsfjorden (Sunnmøre) =

Fjord in Volda, Norway

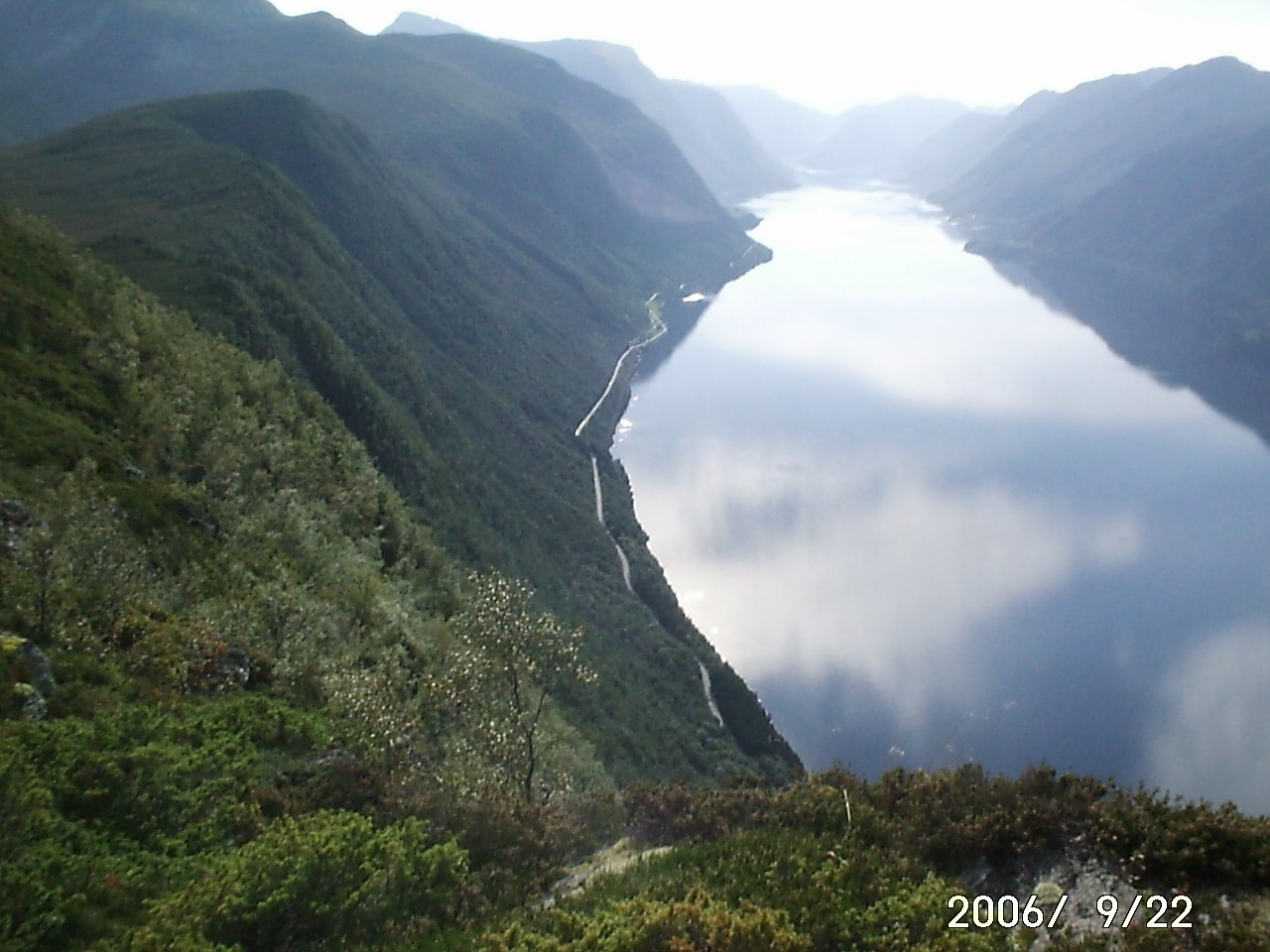
- View of the fjord
- Interactive map of the fjord
- Location: Møre og Romsdal county, Norway
- Coordinates: 62.0912°N 5.9314°E
- Type: Fjord
- Primary outflows: Voldsfjorden
- Basin countries: Norway
- Max. length: 17 kilometres (11 mi)
- Max. width: 1.8 kilometres (1.1 mi)
- Max. depth: −209 metres (−686 ft)

Dalsfjorden is a fjord in Volda Municipality in Møre og Romsdal county, Norway. The 17-kilometre (11 mi) long fjord flows north into the Voldsfjorden. There are several small villages along the shores of the fjord, the largest of which are Dravlaus on the western shore, Steinsvika at the southern end of the fjord, and Dalsbygda on the eastern shore. County Road 40 runs around the shoreline of the whole fjord.

The fjord averages about 1 to 2 kilometres (0.62 to 1.24 mi) wide and it reaches a depth of 209 metres (686 ft) below sea level. The fjord is surrounded by high mountains and the sides of the inner part of the fjord rise steeply up to 600 to 800 metres (2,000 to 2,600 ft) above sea level.

The old Dalsfjord Municipality (which existed from 1924-1964) encompassed the area surrounding this fjord. Dalsfjord Church sits on the shore of the fjord in the village of Dravlaus, just south of the mouth of the fjord.

== See also ==
- List of Norwegian fjords
