= Sivert Aarflot =

Norwegian educator (1759–1817)

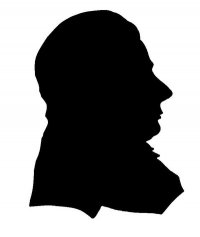
Sivert Aarflot

Sivert Knudsen Aarflot (October 23, 1759 – April 14, 1817) was a Norwegian figure in popular education. He worked as a schoolteacher in Volda in the Sunnmøre district and then served as a lensmann.

== Life ==
Aarflot is known for his work in community education and for introducing improvements in agriculture. As a young man, he was taught by the parish priest Hans Strøm in Volda. He became a peripatetic teacher in 1778 and then a lensman in Volda in 1798. In 1800 he moved to the Ekset farm, where he set up a print shop in 1808 and issued the weekly newspaper Norsk Landboeblad. He also established a Sunday school here in 1802, where teaching in the natural sciences had a prominent place, and he made his book collection available to the general public. For these efforts, he was honored with the gold medal of the Danish Society of Agriculture. In 1811 he founded the Welfare Society for the Parish of Volda (Selskabet for Voldens Præstegjælds Vel). His children were the hymn writer and author Berte Canutte Aarflot (1795–1859) and the editor and politician Rasmus Aarflot (1792–1845).

Sivert Aarflot was one of the first Norwegians to write about house marks, in his article "Om nogle af Hovedkaraktererne iblandt de saakaldte gamlævis Bumærkji, som ellers heder Runebogstaver" (Regarding Some of the Main Characteristics among the So-Called Old-Fashioned House Marks, Otherwise Called Runic Characters), published in Norsk Landboeblad in 1811.

The philologist Ivar Aasen (1813–1896) gained much of his first knowledge from the bookshelves at Ekset. The Åsen farm lies only three kilometers from Ekset, and so they were almost neighbors. Aarflot himself had made observations about the relationship between the Sunnmøre dialect and Old West Norse, and this may have inspired the young Aasen.

Aarflot was a member of the Sunnmøre Practical Agricultural Society (Syndmøre practiske Landhuusholdningsselskab).

== Print shop owner and newspaper publisher ==
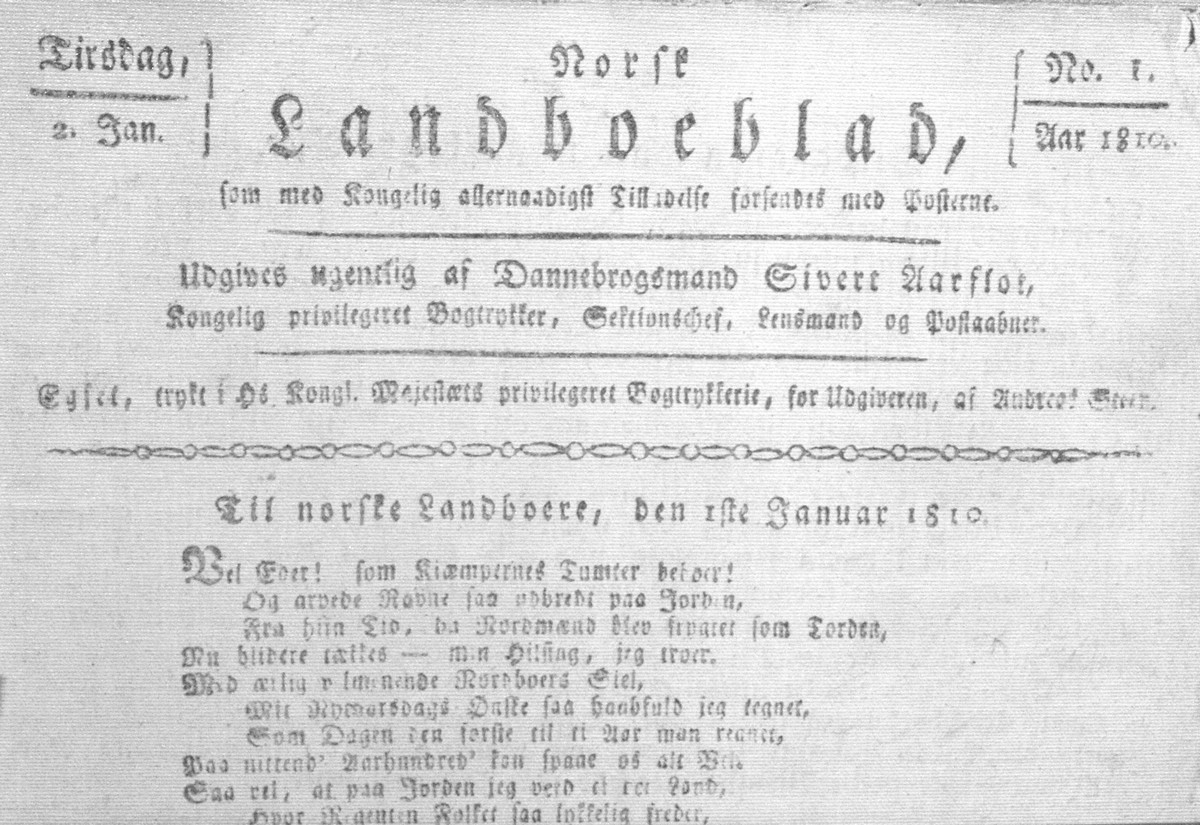
First front page of the newspaper Norsk Landboeblad

On December 22, 1807, Aarflot wrote a lengthy request to the king in Copenhagen asking permission to start his own print shop. In his request he listed the handwritten works that he held in his private library and wished to print in thirteen points. In addition, he made it clear that he planned to publish a weekly newspaper called The Village Gazette for Norway ("Et Ugeblad Kaldet: Landboebladet for Norge"). In May 1808, the postal service recommended a postage exemption for the newspaper in Norway and Denmark. On July 15, 1808, Aarflot received permission to engage in printing operations. With the help of a friend from Trondheim engaged in book printing, Aarflot started printing in 1809. This was the first print shop to operate outside of a town in Norway (Ålesund was not a town at that time).

== Bibliography ==
- Naturlige Aarsager til Fiskeriernes Til-og Fragang ved de Nordenfjeldske Kyster: et Forsøg fremlagt til mer Kyndiges Betænkning (Natural Causes of Fisheries' Increase and Decline on the Nordenfjells Coast: An Essay Submitted to a More Expert Report; in: Handels- og Industritidende, 1804, pp. 195–213)
- Hampens Dyrkning og Tilberedning: en kort Anviisning for nordenfieldske Landboer (Hemp Cultivation and Preparation: A Brief Introduction for Nordenfjells Farmers; Copenhagen,1805)
- Kort Udsigt over Søndmørs Torskefiskerie, og Tanker i samme Anledning i Foraaret 1805 (A Brief Overview of the Sunnmøre Cod Fisheries, and Thoughts on the Same Matter in the Spring of 1805; in: Handels- og Industritidende, 1805, pp. 171–204)
- Norsk Jorddyrkers Almanak (Norwegian Farmers' Almanac; Copenhagen, 1805–1806)
- Efterretning om det svenske Kongehuus, og noget om Tilstanden i Sverrig før og efter sidste Krige med Frankrig, Rusland og Norge (Information about the Swedish Royal House and Something about the State of Sweden before and after the Last Wars with France, Russia, and Norway; Ekset, 1809)
- Hædrende Velkomst-Hilsing til den i Attaqven ved Berby den 12te September 1808 blæsserede, af sine Saar nogenledes restituerede, og i Oktober 1809 til sin Føde-Egn hiemkommen Grenadeer John Andersen Biørdal (Honorable Welcome Greetings to the Grenadier John Andersen Biørdal, Wounded in the Attack at Berby on September 12, 1808, Somewhat Recovered from His Injury, and Returned to His Homeland in October 1809; Ekset, 1809)
- Om anvendte og anvendelige Fødemidler i Kornmangels Tid (On Used and Useful Fodder during a Lack of Grain; Ekset, 1813)
- Billed-ABC-Bog for gode Børn (Illustrated ABC Book for Good Children; Ekset, 1815)
- Dyrerigets første Bog, eller Pattedyrenes Naturhistorie med 90 Afb. og 192 Beskrivelser (First Book of Animals, or the Natural History of the Mammals with 90 Illustrations and 192 Descriptions; Ekset, 1815)
- Dyrerigets anden Bog, eller Fuglenes Naturhistorie med ca. 70 Afb., samt Beskrivelse over mer end 300 Fugle-Slags og Arter (Second Book of Animals, or the Natural History of the Birds with about 70 Illustrations and Descriptions of over 300 Types and Species of Birds; Ekset, 1816)
- Aarflots Nye Regnebog for Bondebrug: ved Specie-Mynts-Beregninger blant flere Slags Penge-forhold. Første Hefte (Aarflot's New Registry for Farm Usage: With Specie-Money Calculations in Several Types of Currency. Volume One; Ekset, 1817)
- Runetrolldom og ringstav: frå etterleivde manuskript og prent (Runic Magic and Runic Calendars: From Surviving Manuscripts and Printed Material; Volda, 1949)
