= Lensmann =

Historically holder of a royal fief and now rural police chief

Lensmann in modern Norwegian or lensmand in Danish and older Norwegian spelling (lit. 'fief man'; Old Norse: lénsmaðr) is a term with several distinct meanings in Nordic history. The Icelandic equivalent was a hreppstjóri, Swedish länsman and Finnish nimismies.

== Fief-holder ==
The term lensmann traditionally referred to a holder of a royal fief in Denmark and Norway. As the fiefs were renamed amt in 1662, the term lensmand was replaced with amtmand. In Norway these offices evolved into the modern fylkesmann office. Modern Norwegian historians often use the term lensherre (English: 'fief lord') instead of lensmann, although from the legal point of view, the king was the fief lord, and the title used by contemporaries was lensmand, not lensherre.

While the lensmann was a fief-holder from the nobility, the amtmann was a civil servant who might be ennobled as a reward.

Differences between lensmann and amtmann
Office	Lensmann	Amtmann
General governing power	Yes	No
Military commander	Yes	No
Tax collector	Yes	No
Fiscal accountability	No	Yes

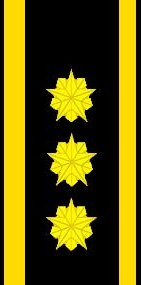
Rank badge of a modern Norwegian police lensmann.

== Modern police officer ==
The title lensmann is also used in an entirely different meaning in modern Norway, denoting the leader of a rural police district known as a lensmannsdistrikt.

== See also ==
- Sheriff
