= Niderviller pottery =

French pottery manufacturer

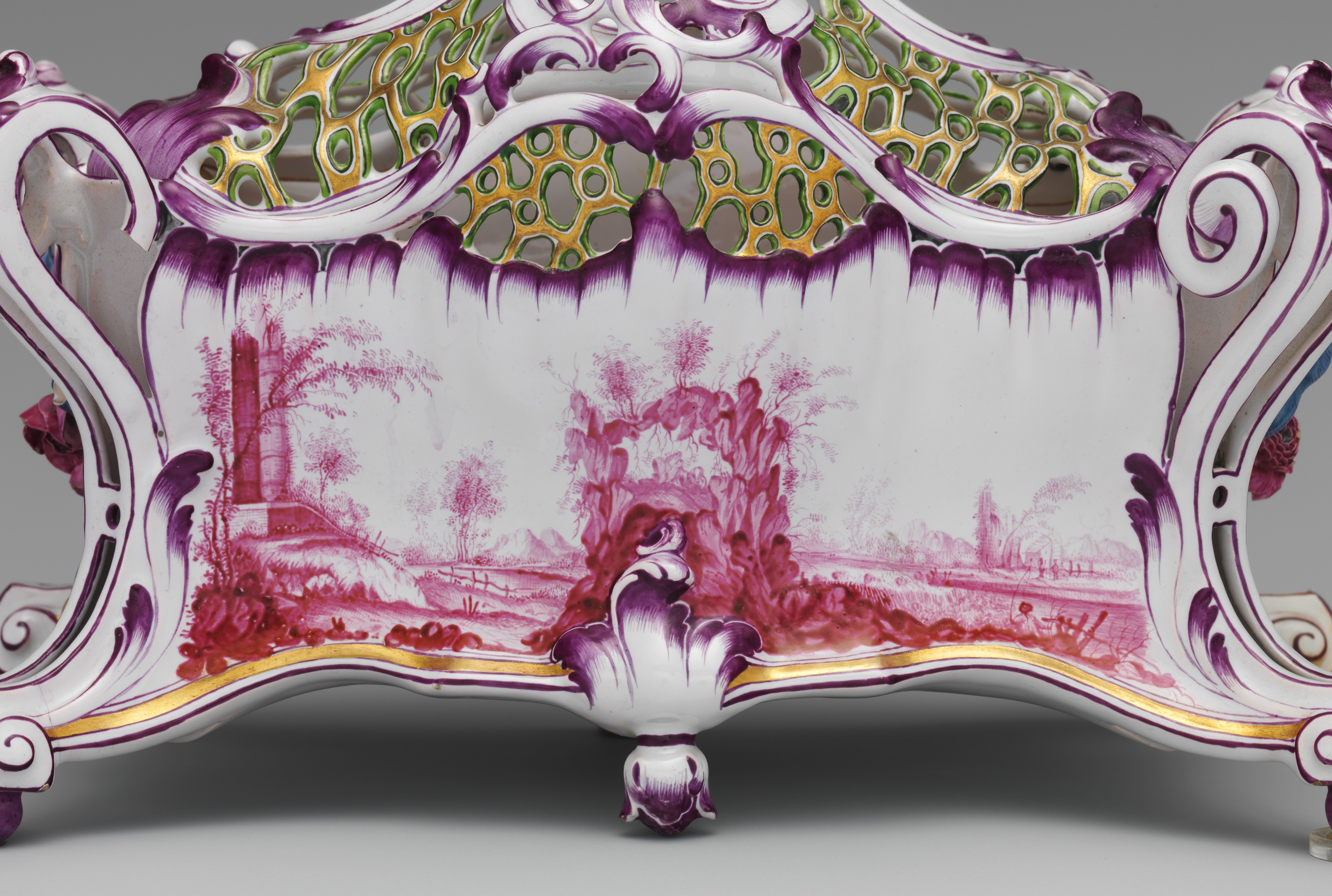
Potpourri with cover, showing the elegance of form and painted decoration that the factory achieved in faience, 1760-65

Niderviller faience (German Niederweiler) is one of the most famous French pottery manufacturers. It has been located in the village of Niderviller, Lorraine, France since 1735. It began as a maker of faïence (tin-glazed earthenware), and returned to making this after a period in the mid-18th century when it also made hard-paste porcelain. In both materials, it made heavy use of deep magenta or pink in its decoration.

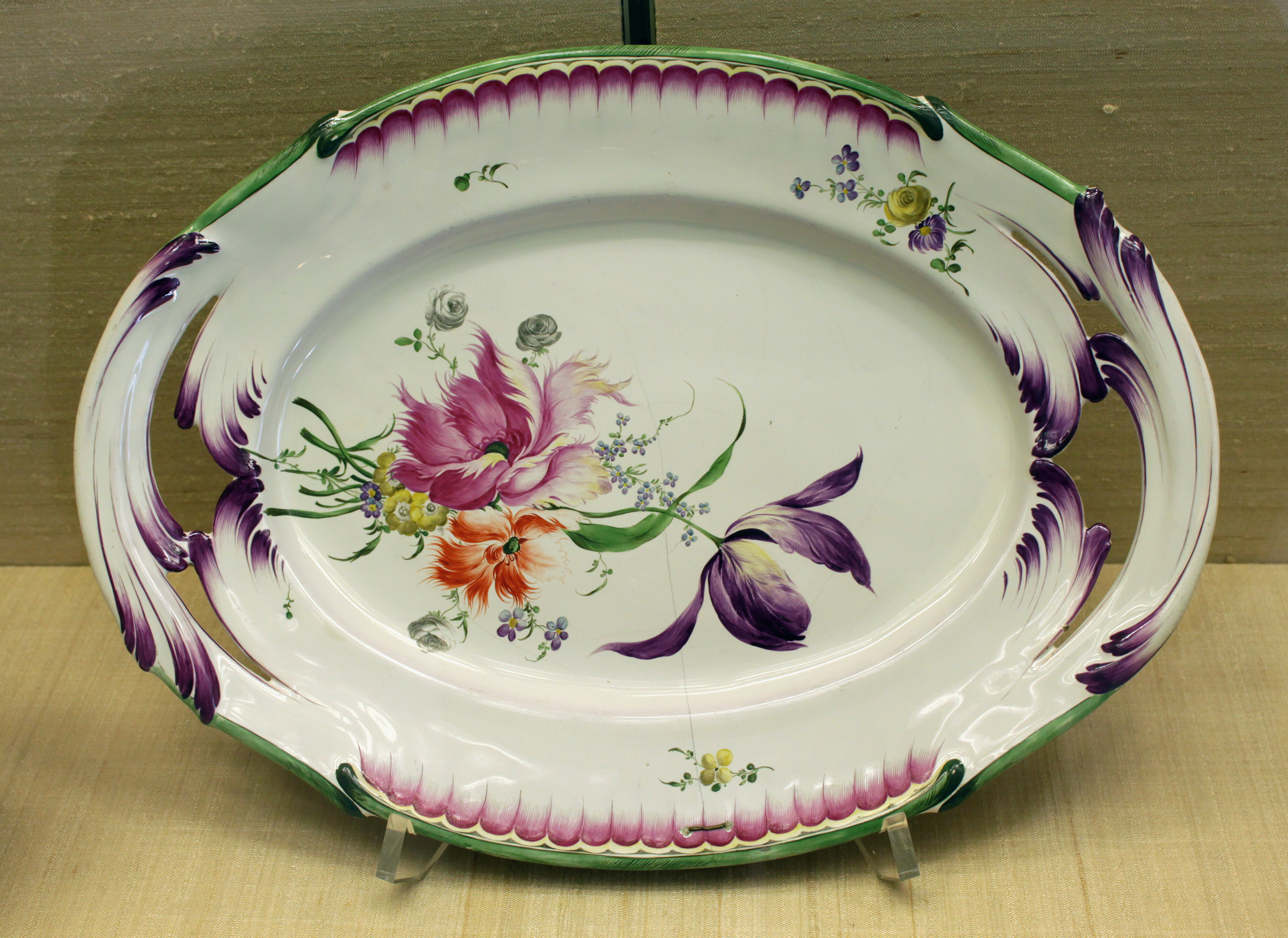
Porcelain platter, Beyerlé period, c. 1760s

== History ==
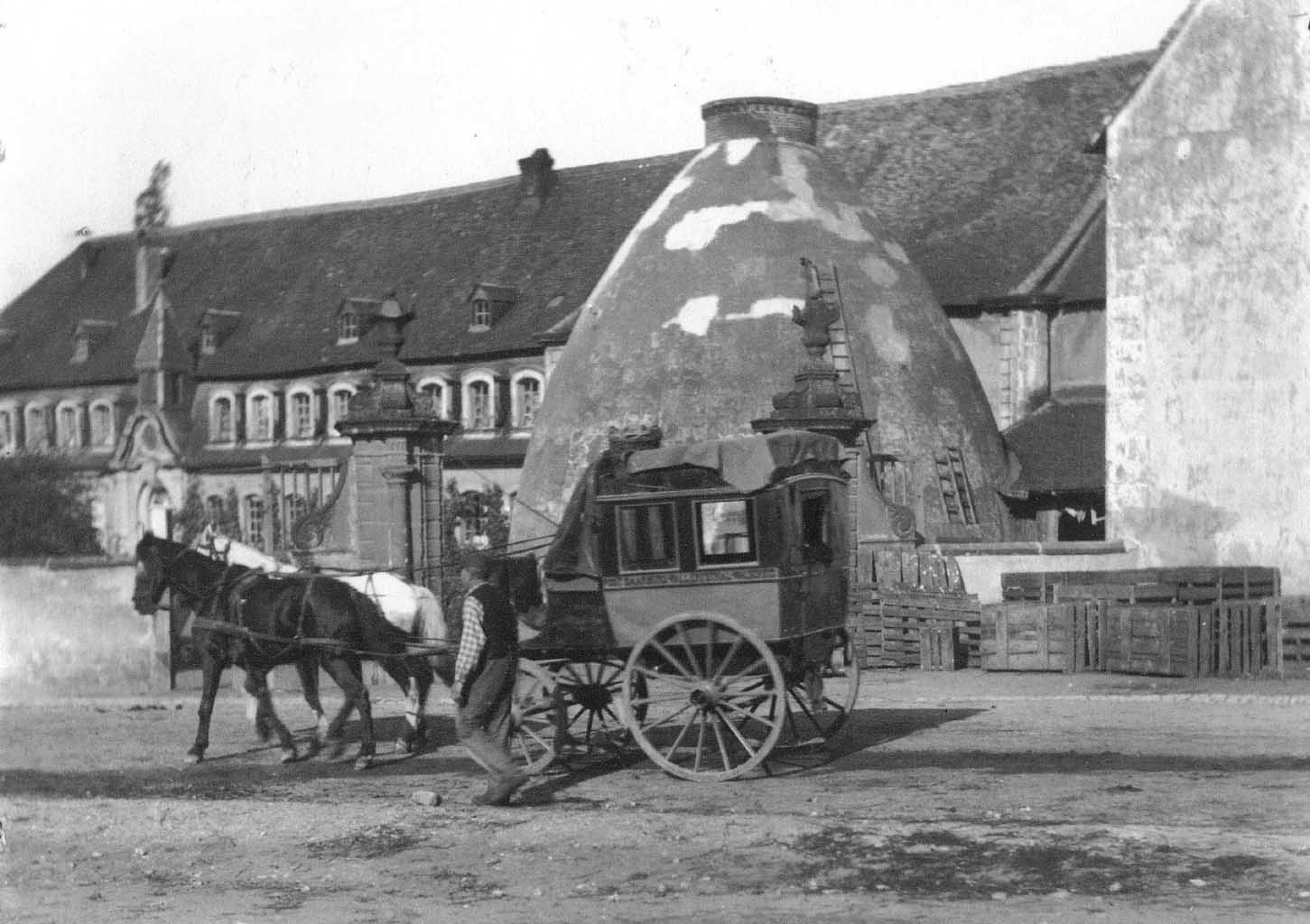
Entrance of the manufactory c. 1900.

In 1735, Anne-Marie Défontaine, lord of the village, decided to put her forests and quarries to a good use by starting a pottery works. She drew on local skills available in Lorraine to gather the proper staff, including Mathias le Sprit as manager. In 1748 her nephews sold it for 90,000 livres to Baron Jean Louis de Beyerlé. In 1763, the company started producing porcelain, thanks to the help of workers recruited from Saxony.

Because of its unique location in the Duchy of Lorraine, where it was exempt from French laws designed to protect the royal monopoly of the Sèvres porcelain manufactory, Niderviller flourished for nearly twenty years, unlike other French porcelain manufacturers of the period.

Baron de Beyerlé authored two known books in 1760 and 1765, both dealing with ceramic technique, secrets of the trade of ceramics, firing of ceramics, openwork, and pilot wheels imitating baskets. Instrumental in the discovery and development of porcelain as we know it today, his books are still considered hallmarks of that period.

Porcelain baskets, Niderviller, ca 1785, Hallwyl Museum, Stockholm.

The full resume of Baron de Beyerlé included Lord of Niderviller, Schneckenbusch, Wuischviller and other places, adviser to the king, Director of the Court of Currencies, master treasurer of the mint of Strasbourg, Ecuyer (member of Nobility of the Second Order), Lawyer, author and Freemason. As director of the Royal Mint in Strasbourg, the Baron produced coins for King Louis XIV, the Sun King, and King Louis XV of France, and for use in the colonies in America.

To produce Niderviller's porcelain, a fine white china-clay known as kaolin was brought from Germany until Baron de Beyerlé bought some of the first kaolin mines, in France, at Saint-Yrieix-la-Perche near Limoges, a long way from Niderviller. The paste produced from the Saint-Yrieix kaolin was white, highly translucent and produced pottery with a distinct color and weight. The artistic directorship was that of his wife, Dame Marguerite Chalons-Drolenvaux. The glaze of the Niderviller factory is considered to have been of the best quality and brilliance, closely resembling the contemporary glaze used at Sèvres.

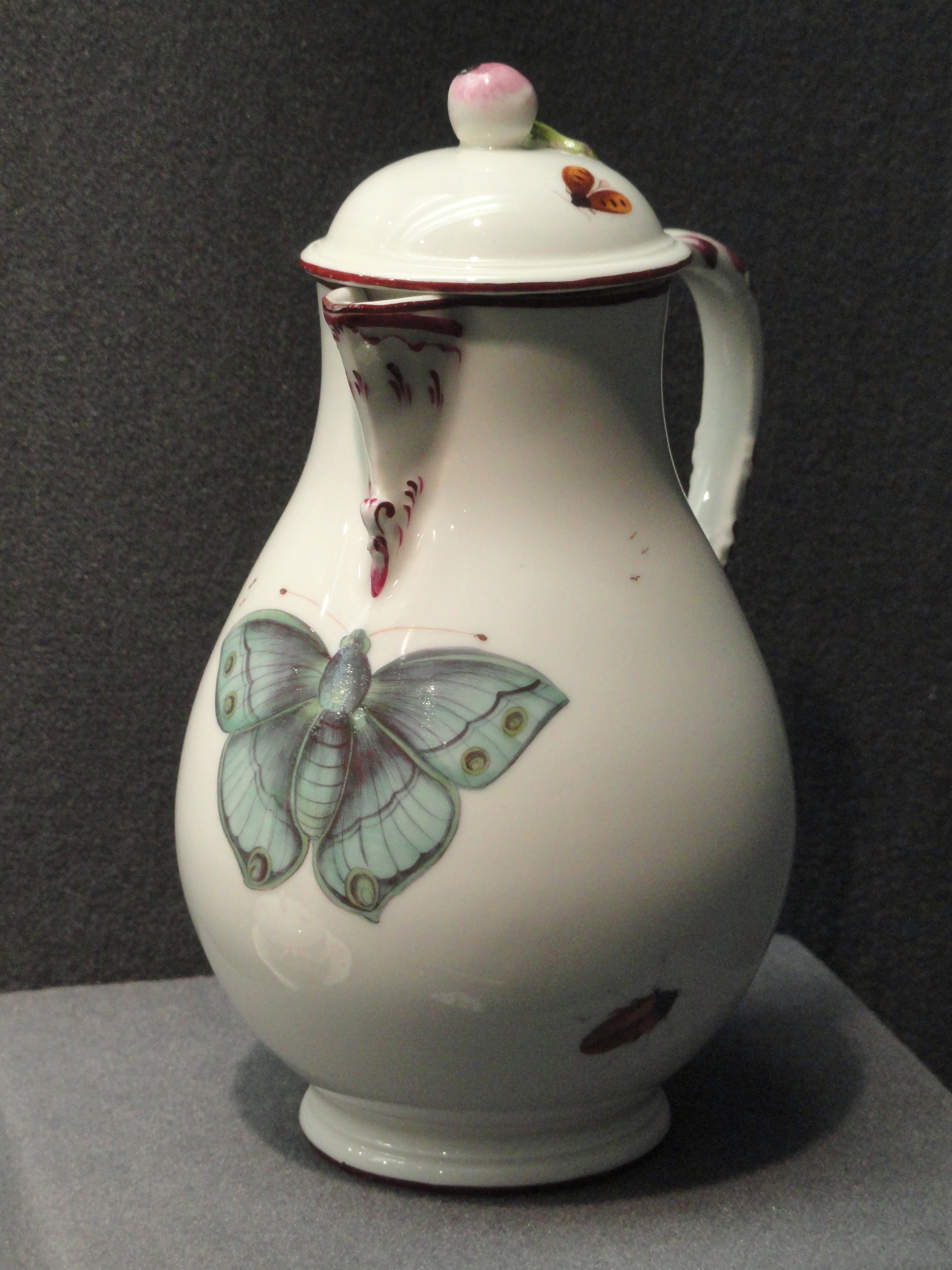
Covered milk jug, hard-paste porcelain, c 1775, Gardiner Museum, Toronto

When Stanisław Leszczyński, who was the duke of Lorraine, died in 1766, the territory passed to the French crown, and the manufactory was then subject to new, even tighter restrictions on production and decoration, as the royal Sèvres porcelain factory had been given various forms of monopoly. Probably because of this, and continuing losses, in 1770 the company was sold by Beyerlé (by then 75) to Adam Philippe, Comte de Custine. Shortly after, it started producing fine earthenware products in the English style, or faience.

The manufactory had enjoyed limited profitability. Various difficulties, including a fire that gutted the production building and a limitation on the manufacture of soft-paste porcelain, discouraged the original investors. When Custine purchased the property in 1770, it was a struggling investment. He encountered significant financial problems over the next eight years, and considered bankruptcy in 1778. He subsequently entered into partnership with François-Henri Lanfrey and the factory began producing faience in the English style of tableware. Lenfrey also revamped the production process, producing cailloutage, which combined faience production techniques with a new process that mixed crushed limestone with the clay. Custine, with his wife, was guillotined in 1793, and his son not long after. This led to the temporary closing of the plant when the regime confiscated his property; the workmen, summarily laid off, travelled to Paris to find work, and several signed a petition for her release. The continued war with the Coalition reduced the number of employees to 15; the factory survived, however, and the Custine share was bought by Lanfrey in 1802.

Custine presented George Washington with a set of this tableware service in 1782.

Lanfrey's sons sold the company to Louis-Guillaume Dryander, a former partner of Villeroy & Boch, in 1827. Porcelain production had resumed in the Napoleonic period, but ceased in 1830. The company enjoyed a renaissance in the mid-nineteenth century, when the business included a German factory making industrial ceramics. In 1871 the area became part of Germany; by then the factory was trading as "S.A. Faïencerie de Niderviller" in French or "Steingutfabriek Niederweiler A.G." in German. It became in Germany again in 1940 for the duration of World War II. Post-war production struggled to make a profit, and there have been various crises and sales. But by 1972 the "Faïenceries de Niderviller et Saint-Amand" (FNSA) employed 700 workers, a number since greatly reduced. The Dryander family still had ownership until the post-war period.

== Museums exhibiting Niderviller ceramics ==
Many museums across the world display Niderviller products, including: the Louvre, the Musée des Arts Décoratifs, Paris, the Sèvres – Cité de la céramique, the Palace of the Dukes of Lorraine, the Musée des Arts décoratifs, Strasbourg, but also the Smithsonian Institution, Mount Vernon, the Philadelphia Museum of Art, the Art Institute of Chicago, the Metropolitan Museum of Art, the Museum of Anthropology at UBC in Vancouver, the Hallwyl Museum in Stockholm and museums in Hamburg, Berlin, Basel, Zürich.

== Staff in 1759 ==
Documentary evidence from Niderviller indicates that in 1759 a large staff was employed at the pottery, in addition, the names of all the employees are given, with the wages each man received. Eleven painters and two sculptors were engaged, which shows that the factory founded by Jean Louis de Beyerlé, towards 1754, had made great progress. The employees were paid in ‘Sols’, a coin minted at the Strasbourg mint. The names and wages of these employees, as listed in LES MERVEILLES DE LACÉRAMIQUE, and were:

- François Anstette, controller of manufacture and probably a member of the same family who worked at the pottery in Haguenau, earned approximately thirty sols per day.
- Jean-Baptiste Mainat, director of the same manufacture, has five taxable quota books per annum pledged.
- Michel Martin, painter, earned approximately twenty sols per day
- Pierre Anstette, painter, earned approximately twenty-four sols per day
- Joseph Secger, painter, approximately twenty sols per day
- Fréderic Adolph Tiebauld, boy painter, approximately twenty-four sols per day.
- Martin Schettier, boy painter, approximately fifteen sols per day
- Augustin Ilerman, boy painter, earned approximately twenty sols per day
- Daniel Koope, boy painter, approximately twelve sols per day
- Michel Anstette, boy painter, approximately twenty-four sols per day
- Jean-Pierre Racket, boy painter, gain approximately eighteen sols per day
- Nicolas Lutze, boy painter, approximately twenty sols per day
- Deroy, boy moulor, approximately twenty sols per day
- Charle Reflects, boy sculptor, approximately twenty-four sols per day
- Jean Thalbotier, boy painter, approximately twenty sols per day
- Philip Arnold, boy sculptor, approximately twenty sols per day

== Gallery ==
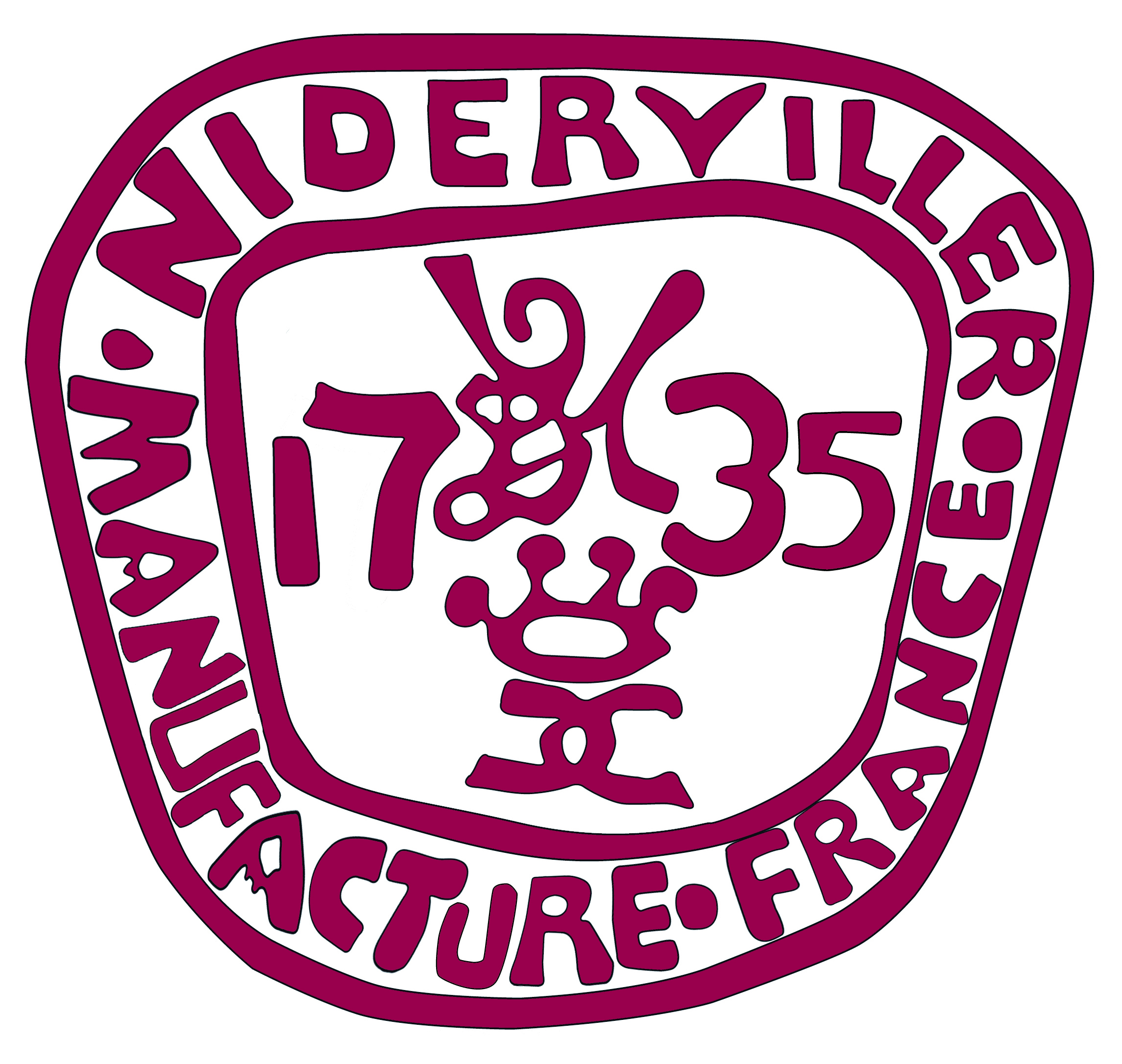
Modern logo

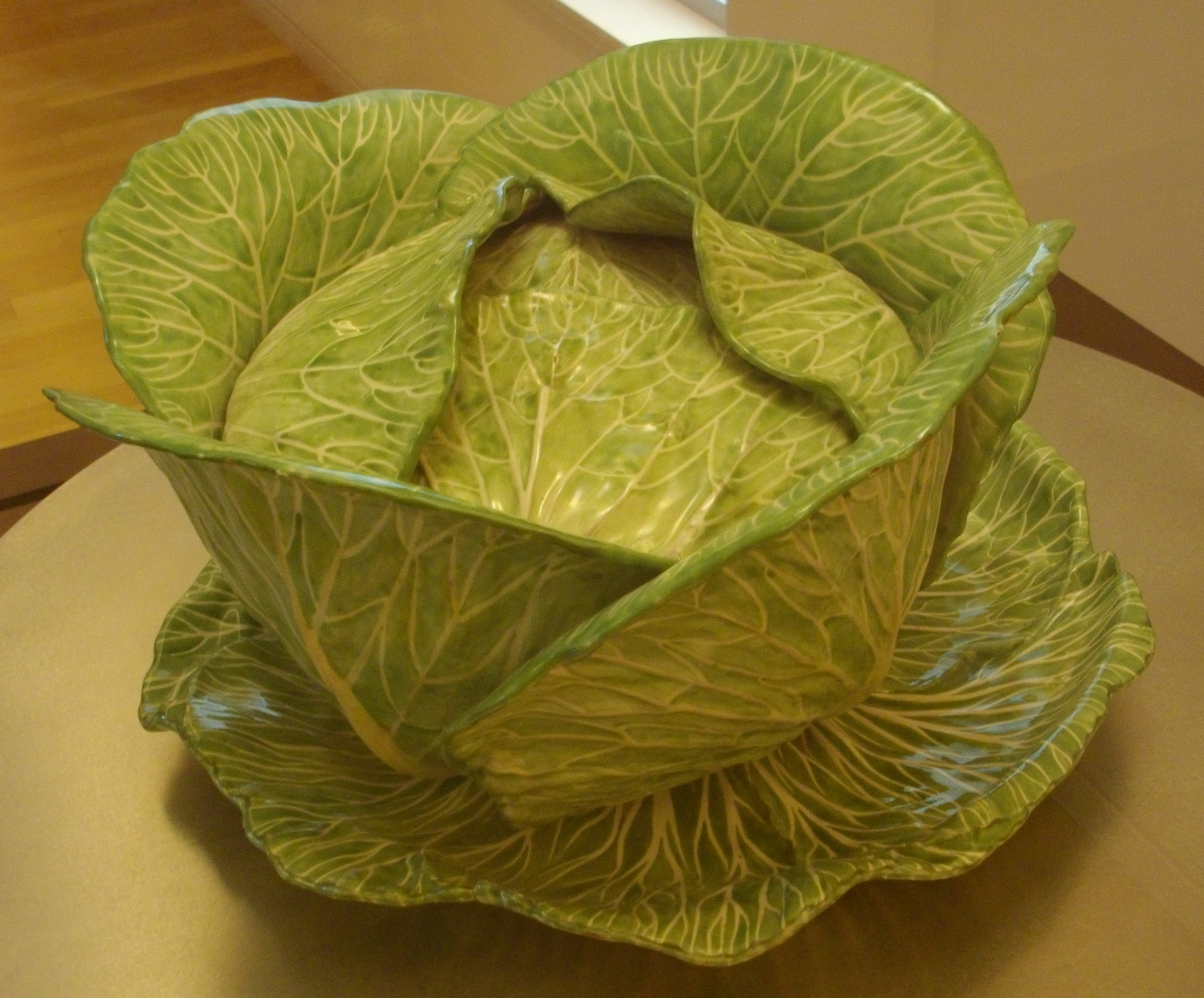
Faience cabbage-shaped tureen, 1760s

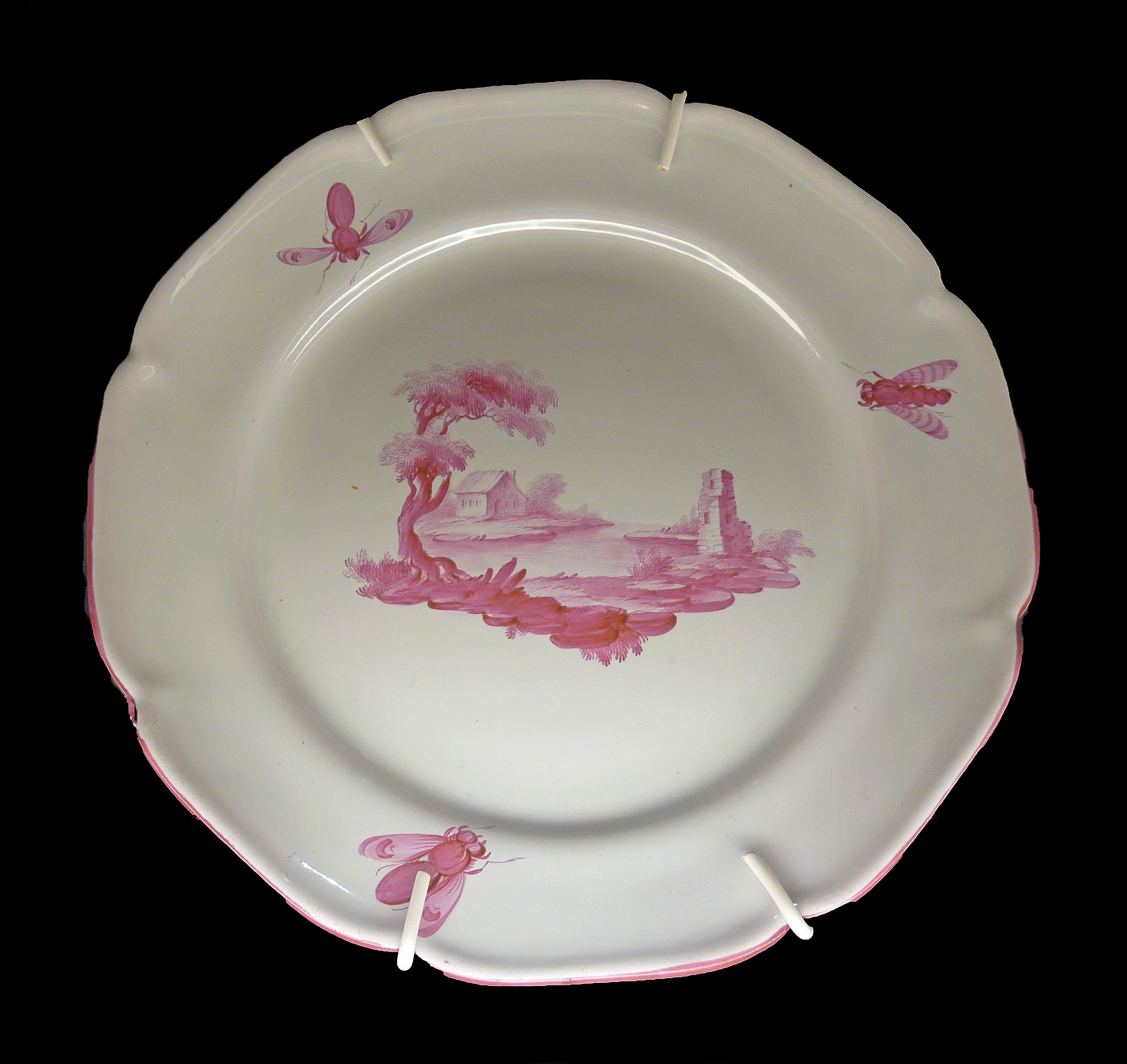
Plate, 18th-century from Custine period (1779–89)

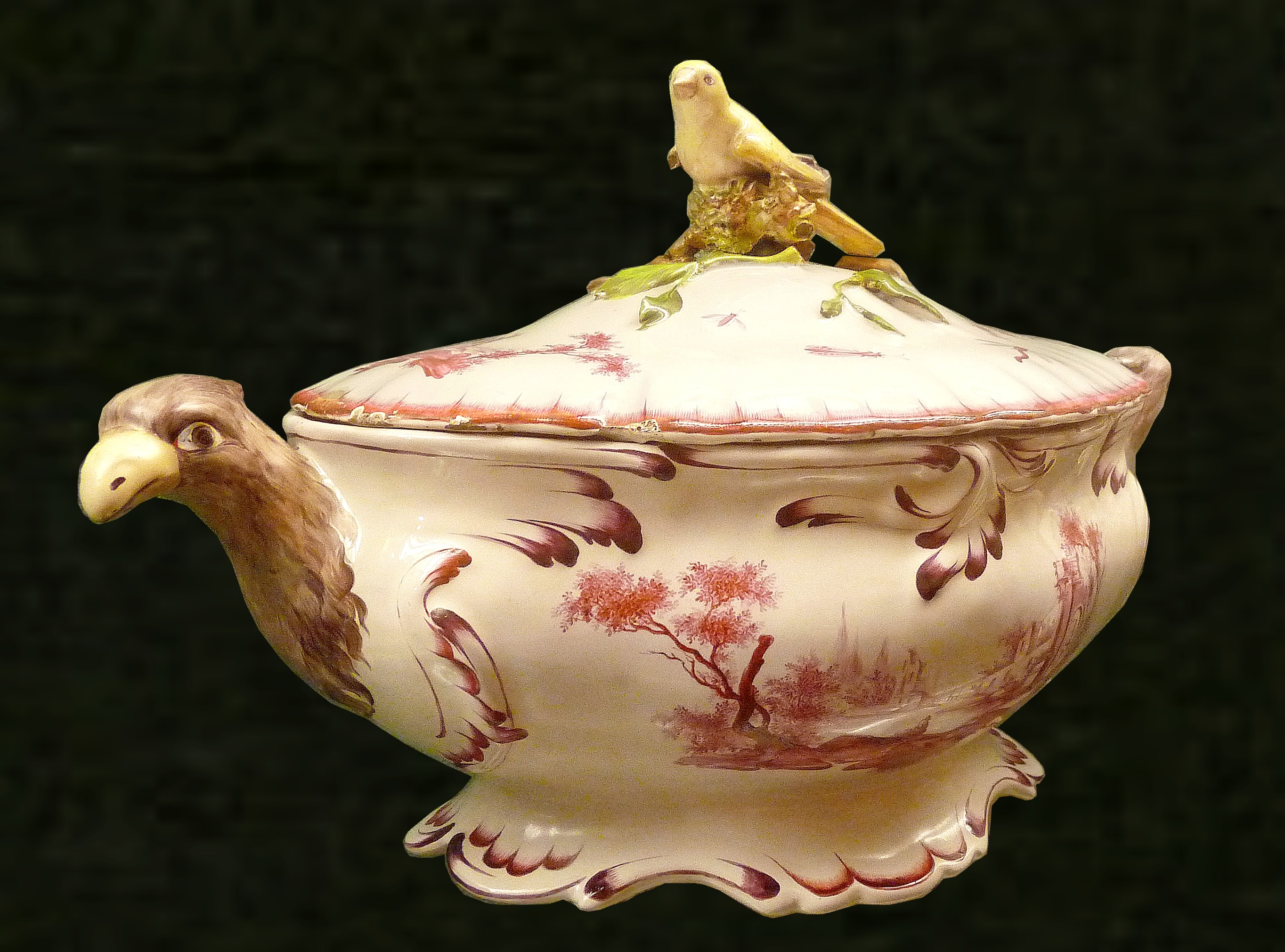
Terrine dish, traditional Niderviller monochrome in pink, c. 1760

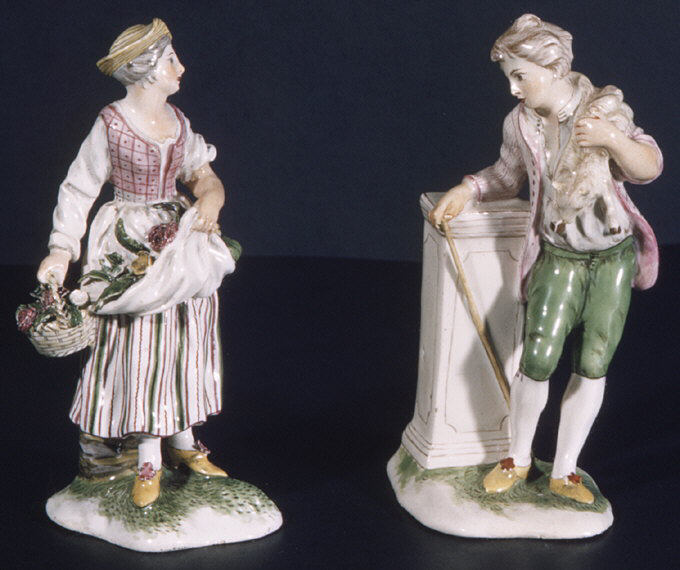
Pair of figurines, faience, 1770s

Detail of porcelain basket above

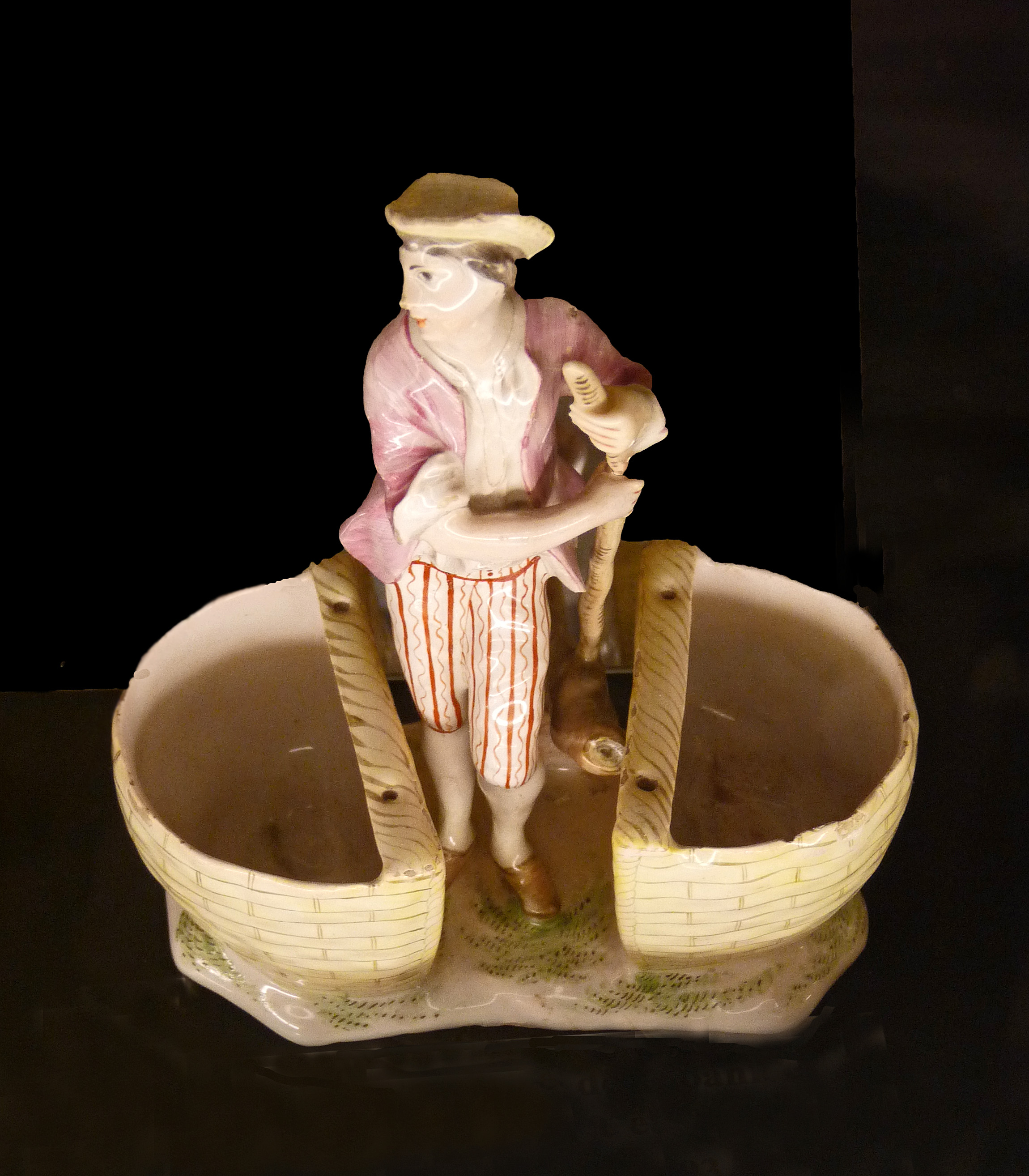
18th century figurine with condiment-holder

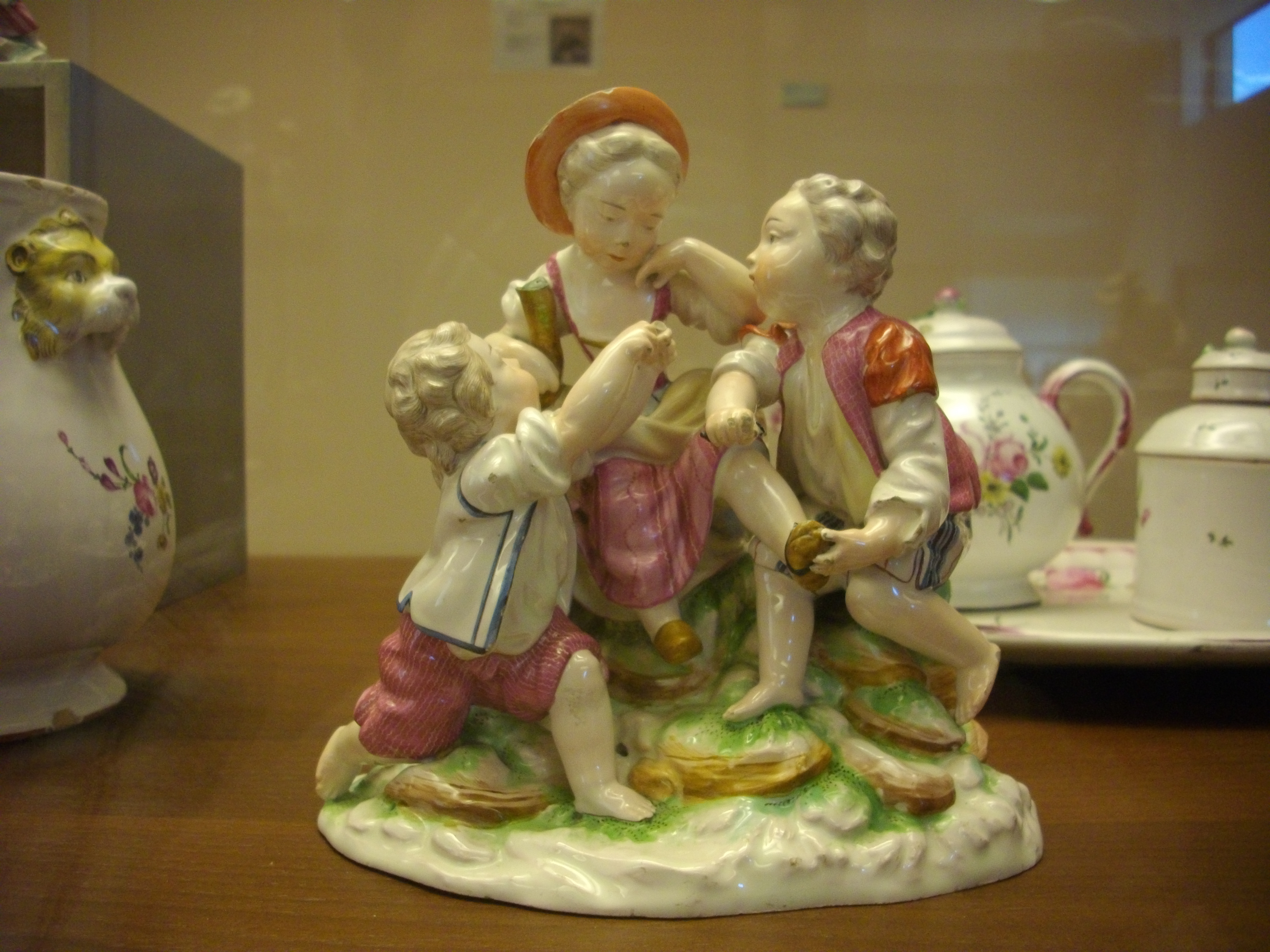
"The broken clog", Niderviller, 18th century

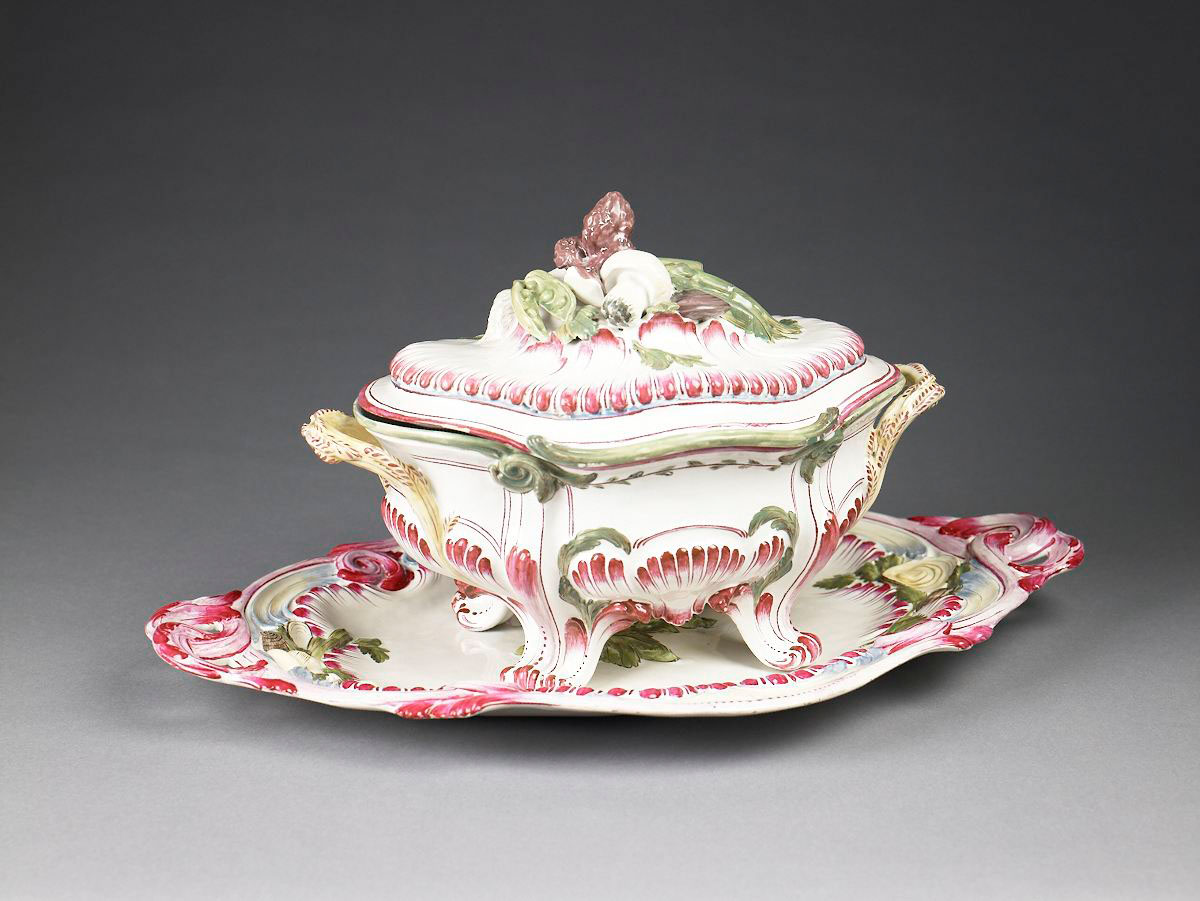
Covered tureen, Niderviller exhibited in the Birmingham Museum and Art Gallery 18th century

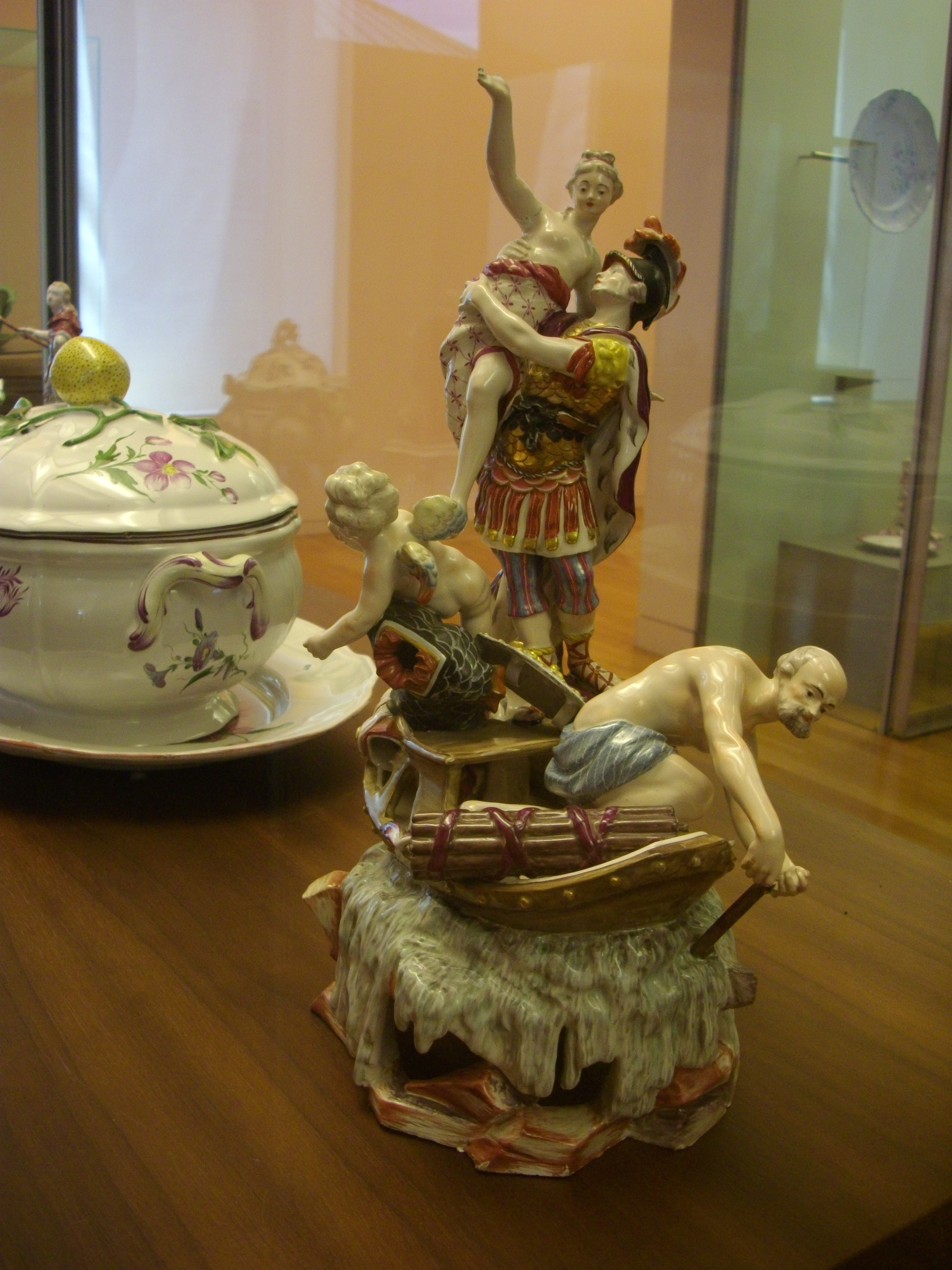
Abduction of Helen, 18th century faience figure group
