= Niderviller =

- Commune
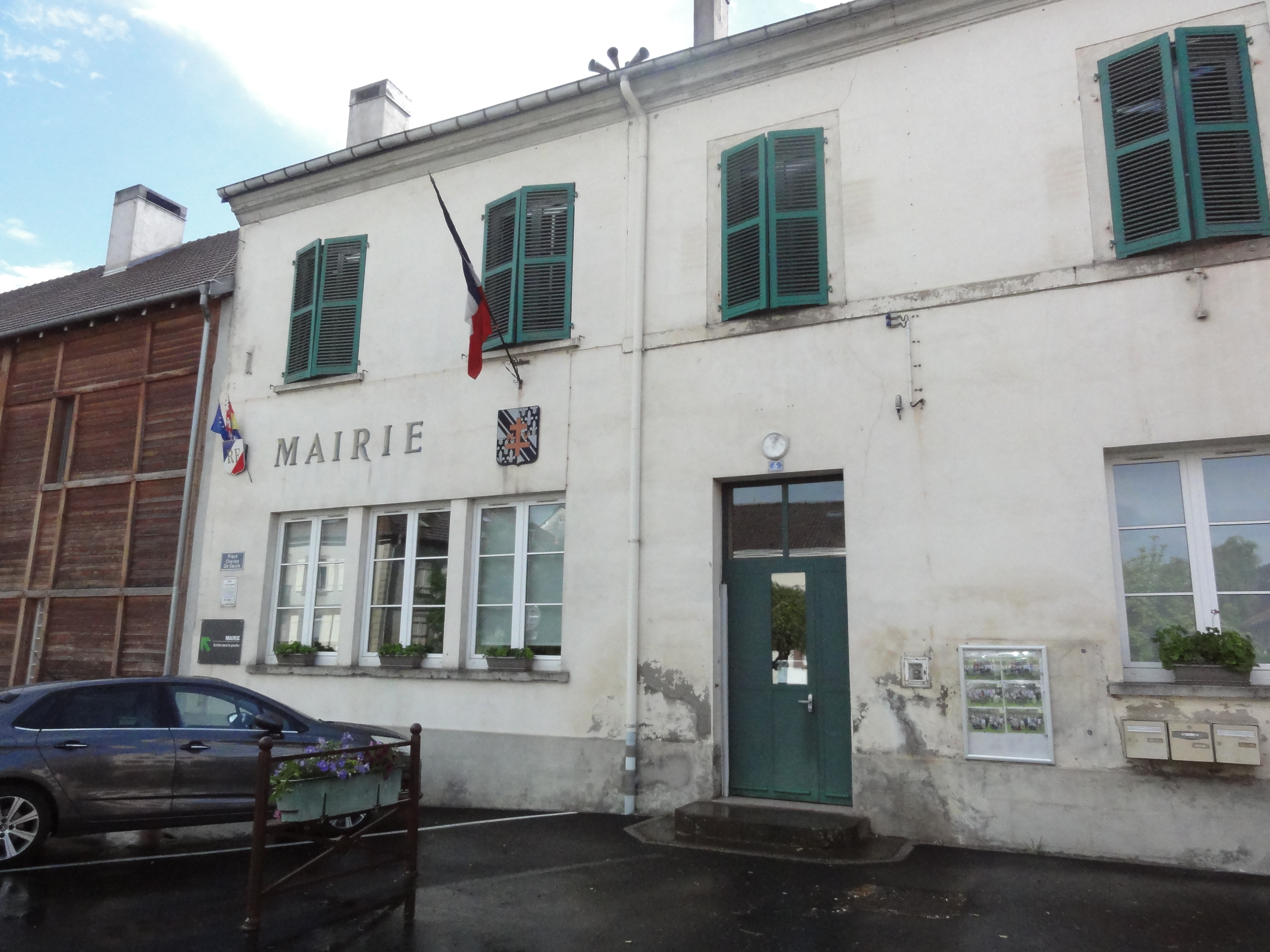
- The town hall in Niderviller

- Coat of arms
- Location of Niderviller
- Location within France Location within Grand Est
- Coordinates: 48°42′49″N 7°06′31″E
- Country: France
- Region: Grand Est
- Department: Moselle
- Arrondissement: Sarrebourg-Château-Salins
- Canton: Phalsbourg
- Intercommunality: CC Sarrebourg Moselle Sud

Government
  - Mayor (2020–2026): Marie-Véronique Buschel
- Area^{1}: 10.75 km^{2} (4.15 sq mi)
- Elevation: 300 m (980 ft)
- Highest elevation: 364 m (1,194 ft)
- Lowest elevation: 257 m (843 ft)
- Population (2023): 1,138
  - Density: 105.9/km^{2} (274.2/sq mi)
- Time zone: UTC+01:00 (CET)
  - Summer (DST): UTC+02:00 (CEST)
- INSEE/Postal code: 57505 /57565
- ^{1} French Land Register data, which excludes lakes, ponds, glaciers > 1 km^{2} (0.386 sq mi or 247 acres) and river estuaries.

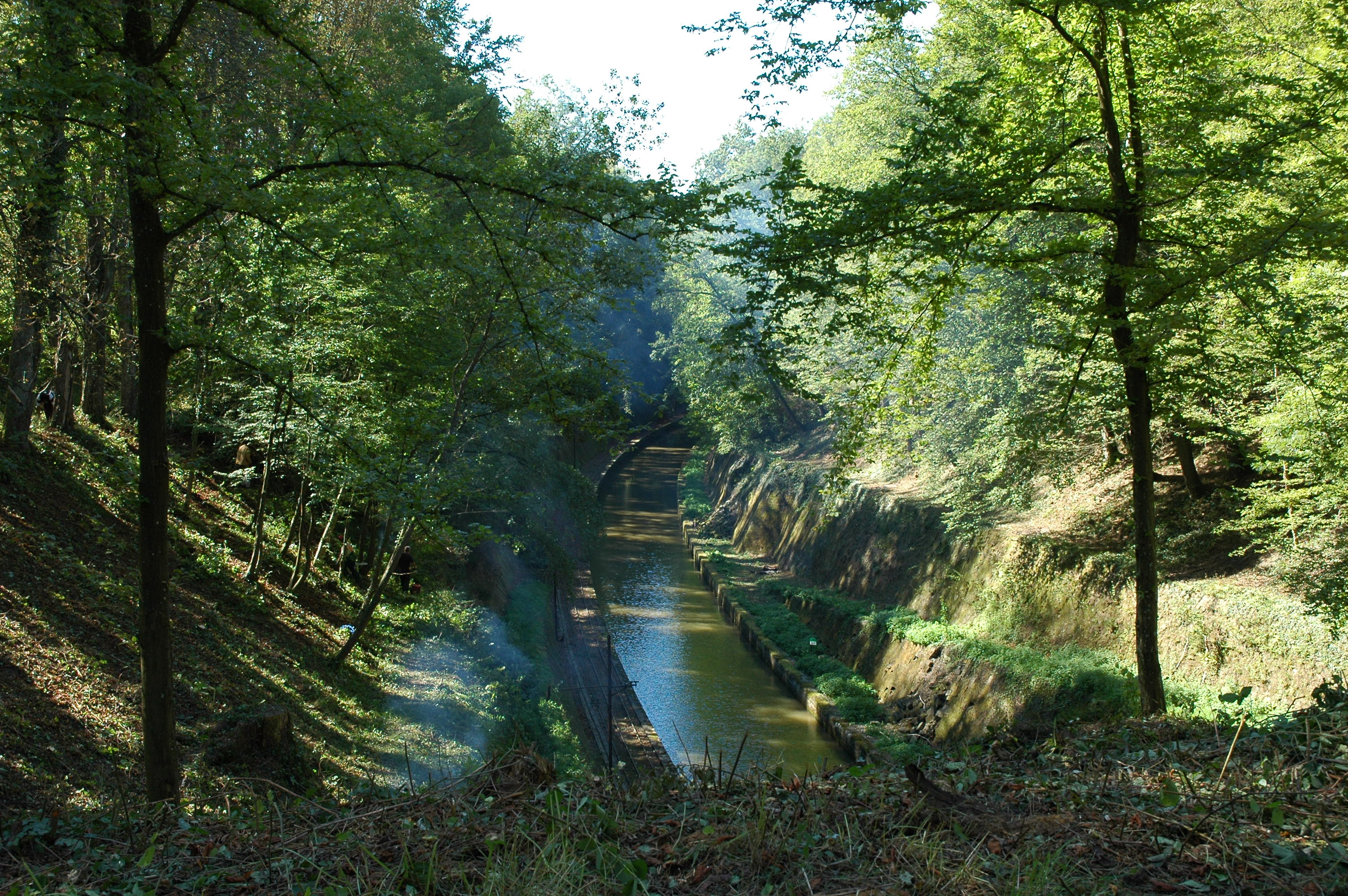
The Marne-Rhine Canal at Niderviller, Moselle.

Niderviller (French pronunciation: [nidɛʁvilɛʁ]; German: Niederweiler) is a commune in the Moselle department in Grand Est in north-eastern France. It is mostly known for the Niderviller pottery, established in 1735 and still producing there.

== Geography ==
Niderviller is located south-east of Sarrebourg.

The commune is served by the departmental roads 45 and 96. It is also crossed by the Marne-Rhine canal, which passes through the Niderviller Underground Tunnel.

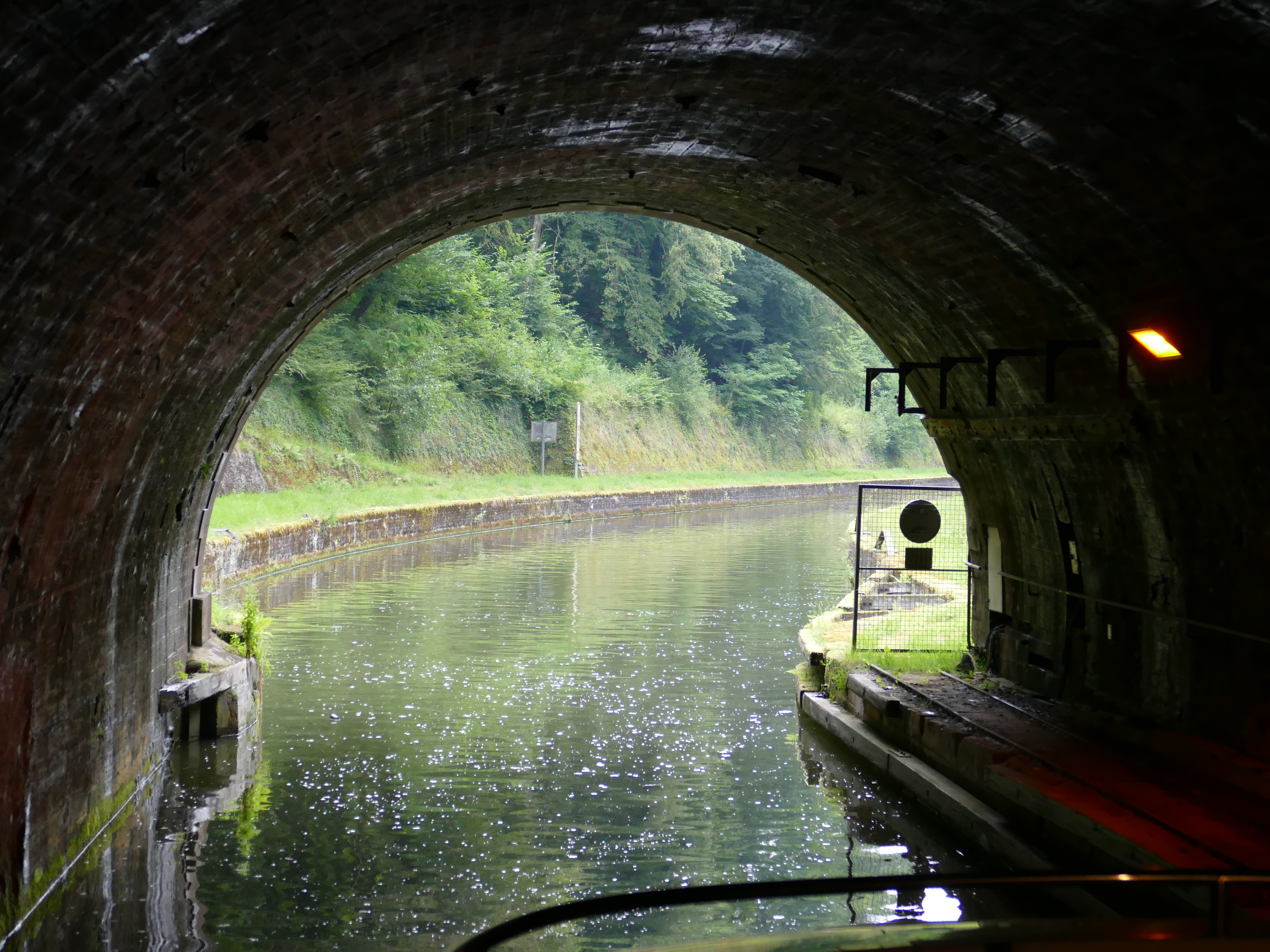
The Underground Tunnel

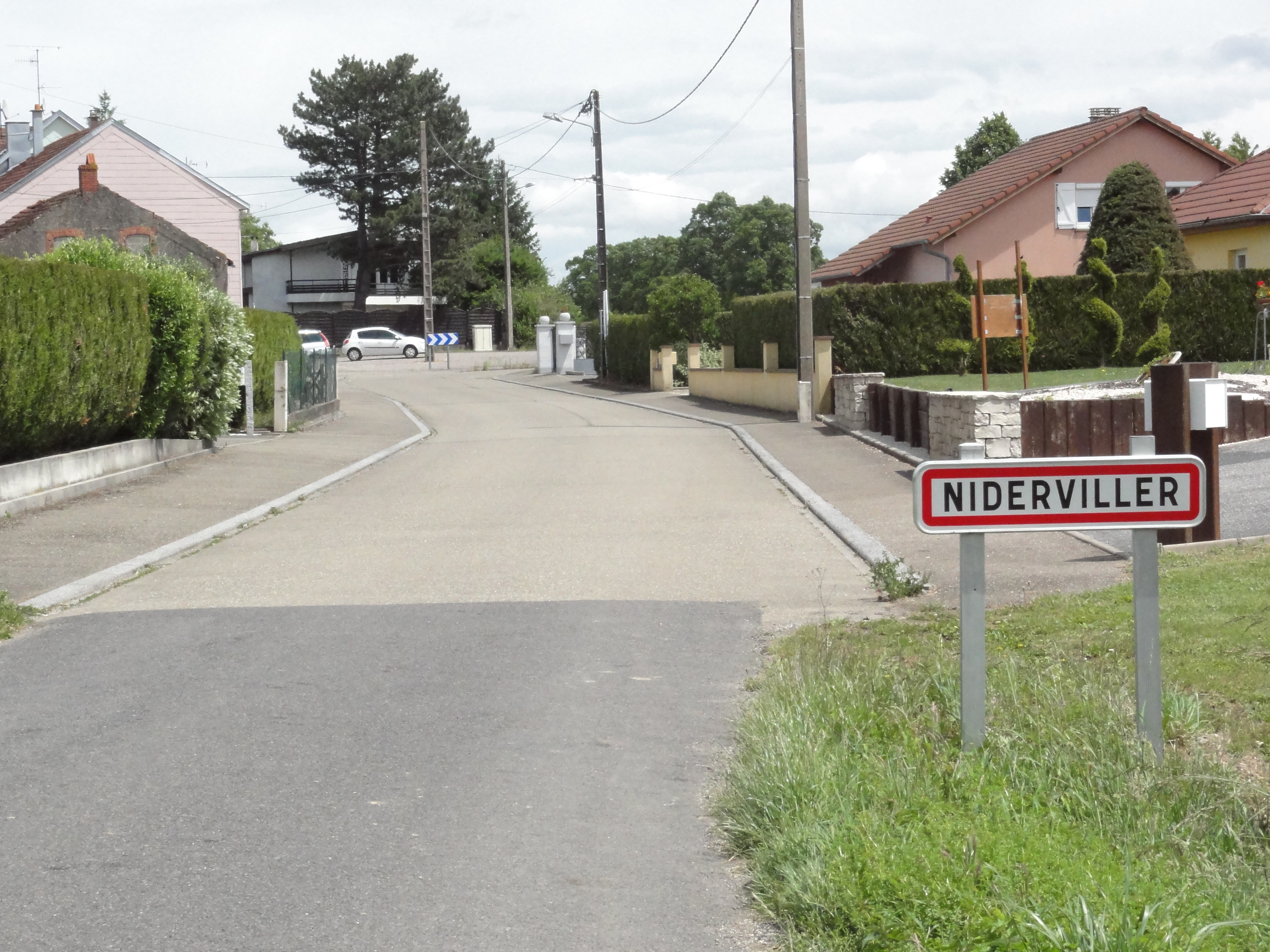
The village entrance

== Toponymy ==
The name of the village come from the germanic words nieder "down, from below" and weiler "hamlet".

Ancient names: Niederwilre (1163), Nyderwilre (15th century), Nyder-Wuelles (1525), Nidersweiller (1594), Niderwiller (18th century), Nidreviller (1793), Niederweiler (1871–1918).

== History ==
Niderviller, which was originally part of the Duchy of Lorraine, was ceded to France in 1661 (Treaty of Vincennes), along with the other localities of the provostry of Sarrebourg.

There was once a castle that belonged to General de Custine, who was killed by the revolutionaries in 1793.

In 1949, the castle was reconverted into an aerial hospital (a sort of sanatorium that uses fresh air) for sick children. It became a convalescent home for victims of cardiovascular accidents in 1982.

== Sights ==
=== Religious monuments ===
- Église Sainte-Croix (Church of the Holy Cross): In 1762, lord of Niderviller, Jean-Louis Beyerlé, and owner of the Niderviller pottery factory, had the present bell tower built.
- Sculpture descente de la Croix : a sculpture representing the descent from the Cross.
- War memorial
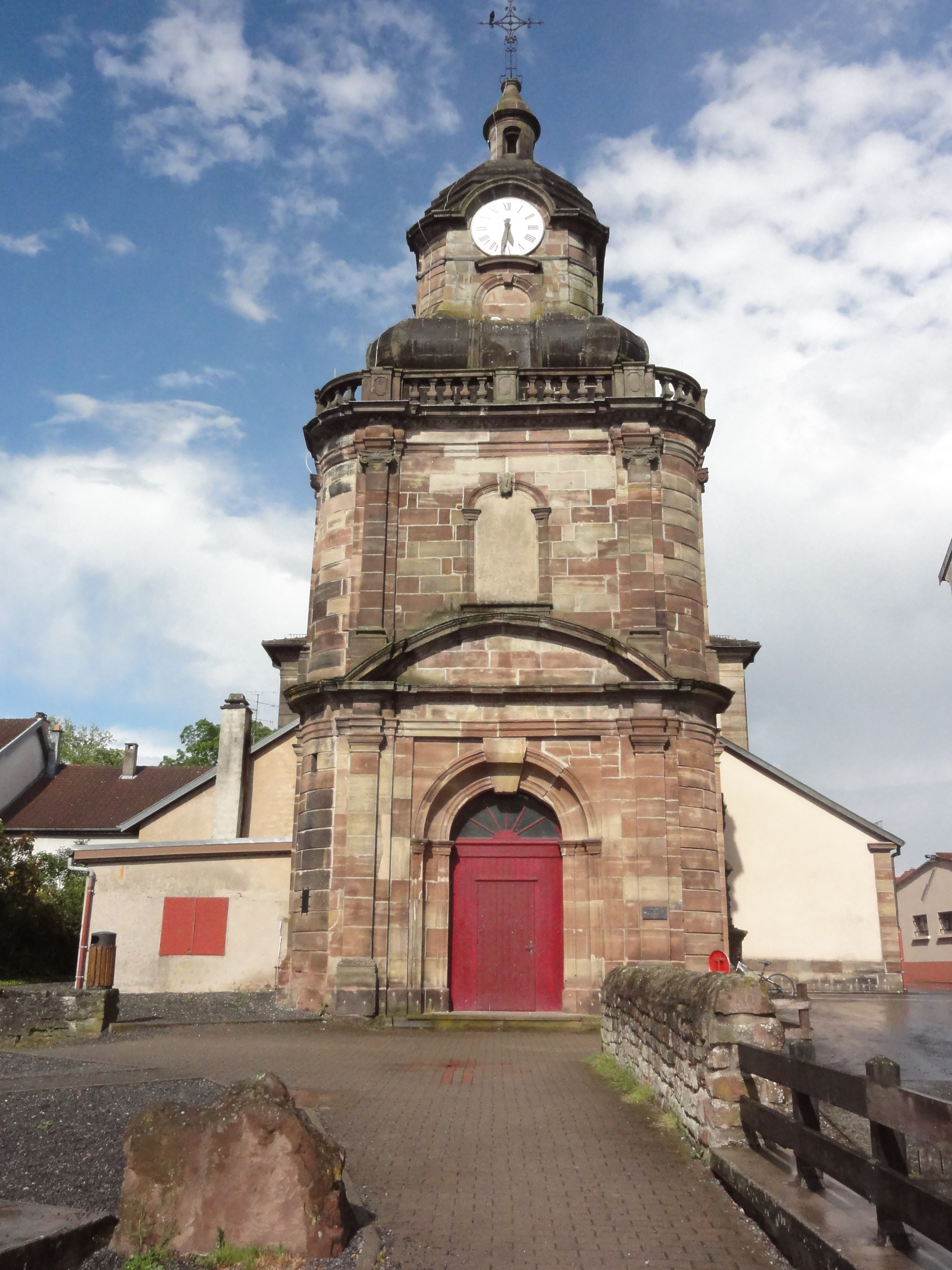
Église Sainte-Croix

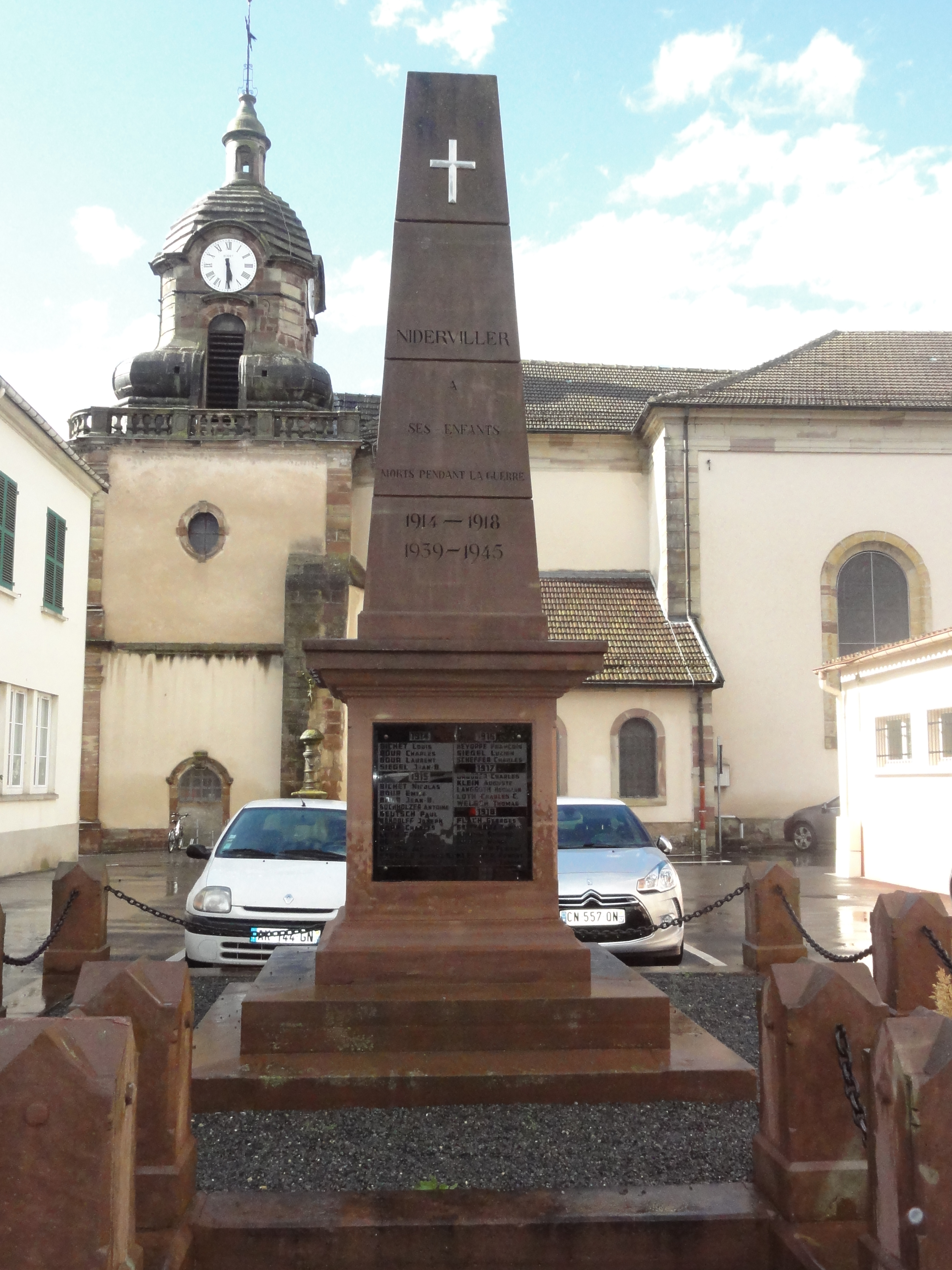
War memorial

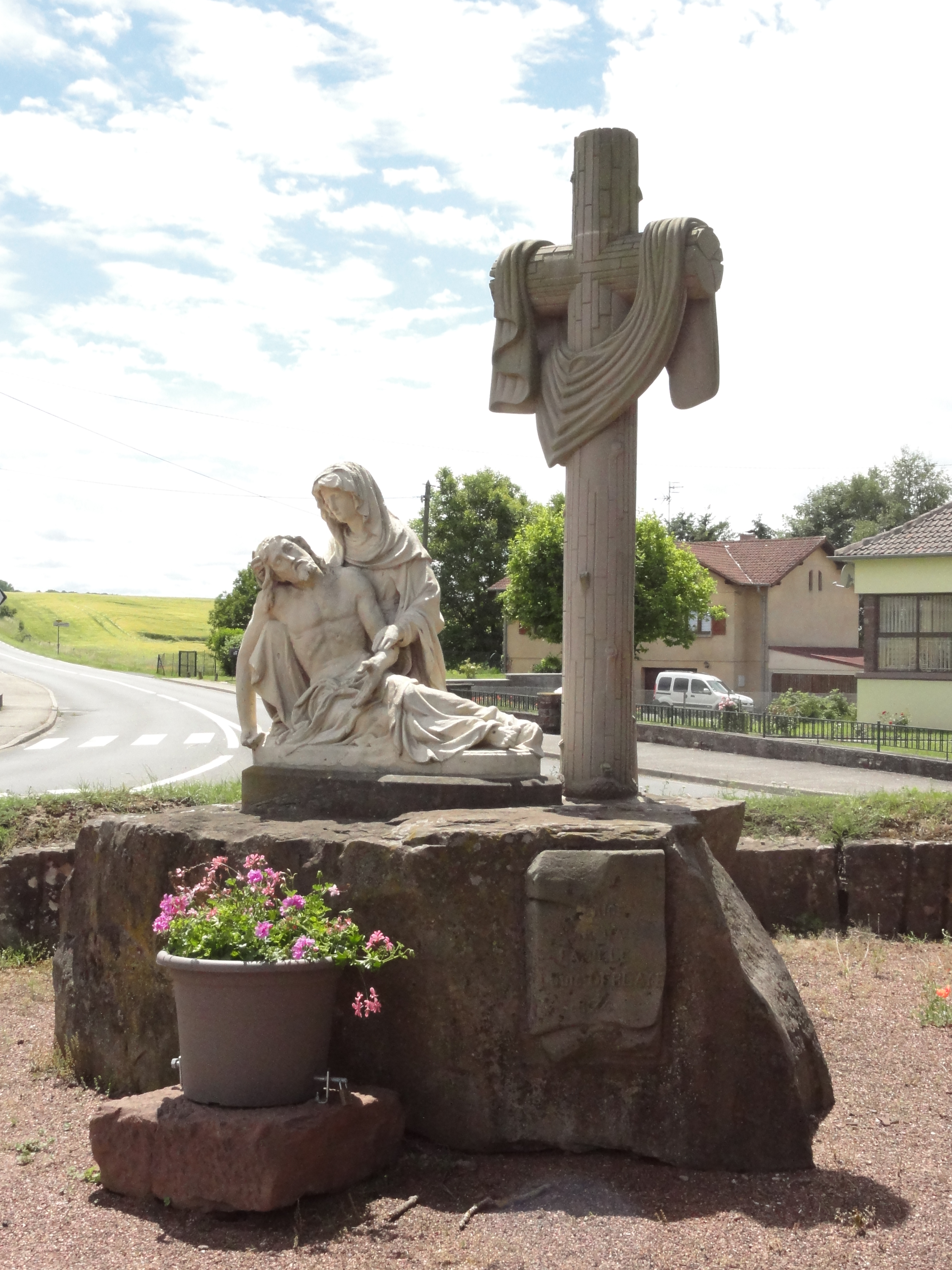
Sculpture Descente de la Croix

=== Historical monuments ===
- Ruins of a Roman villa
- Castle, built around 1863 by Léopold Halphen for his son-in-law Théodore Cerfberr. Since March 1, 1982, it houses part of the Saint-Luc Specialised Rehabilitation Center in Abreschviller.
- Old castle des Custine : this castle is nowadays destroyed

=== Civilian and industrial buildings ===
- Niderviller Pottery factory: the first factory was built in 1735. Its products are the symbol of the village.
- Tile and brick factory
- Old mill
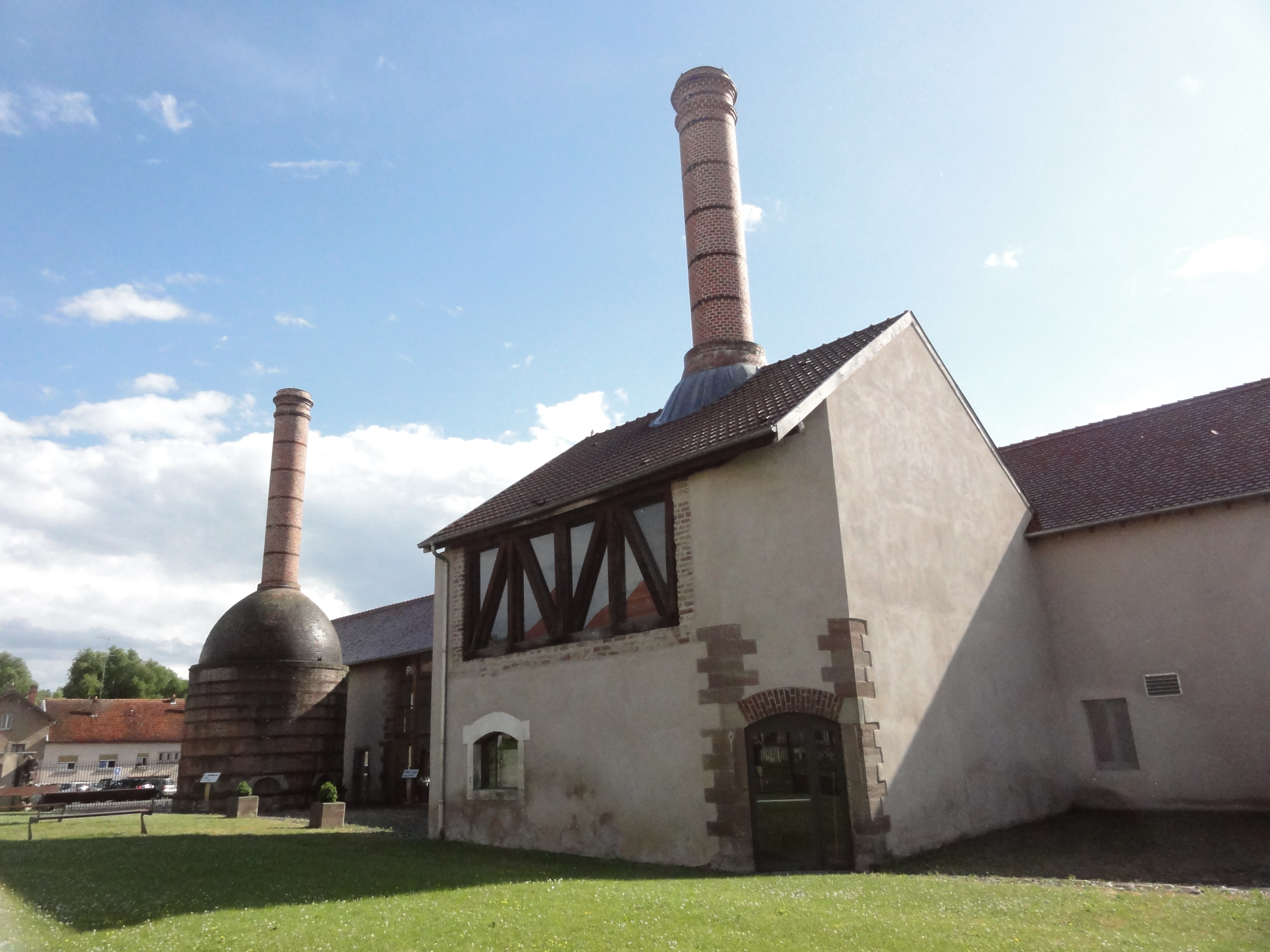
Pottery factory

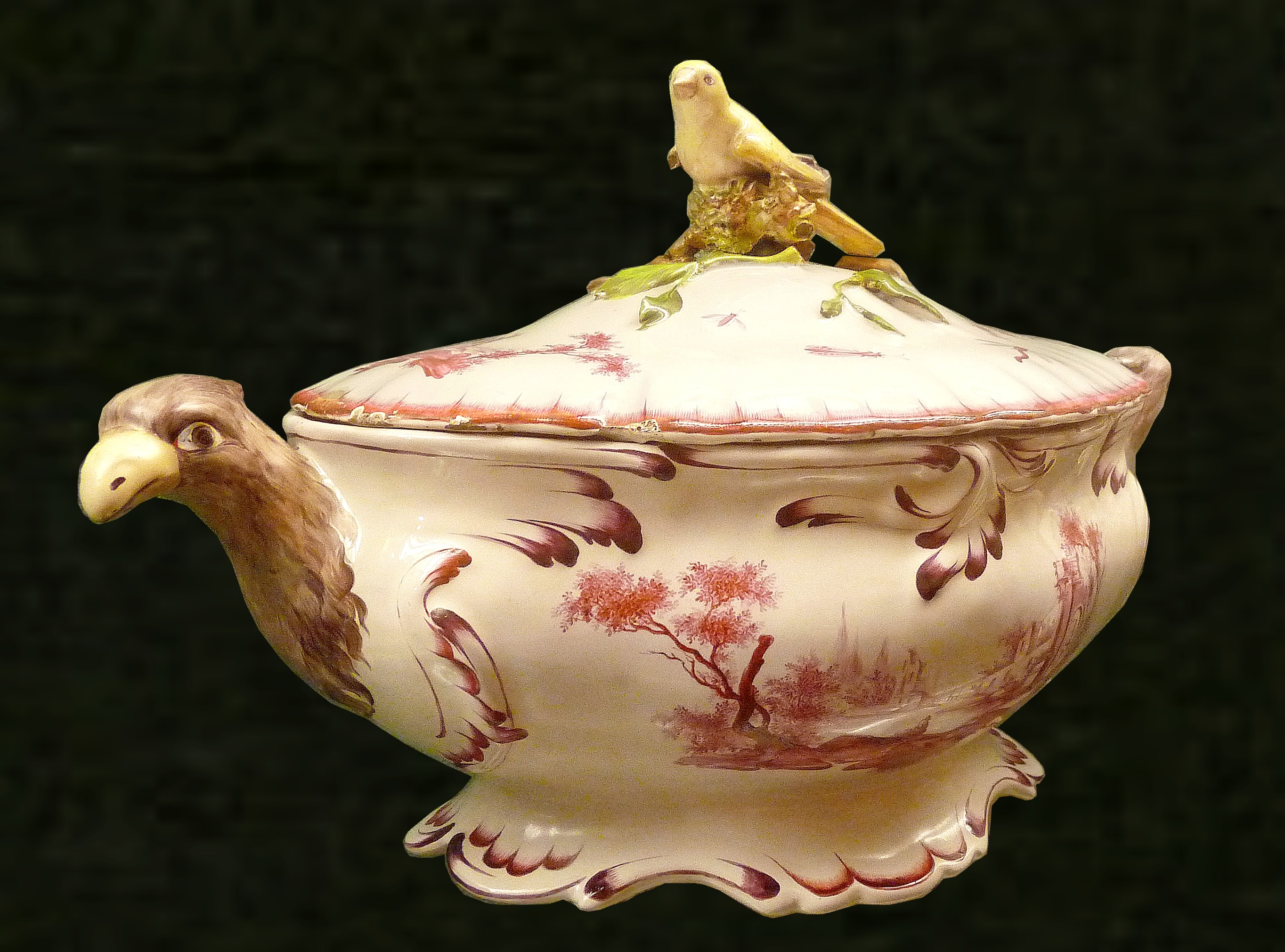
Example of the factory production

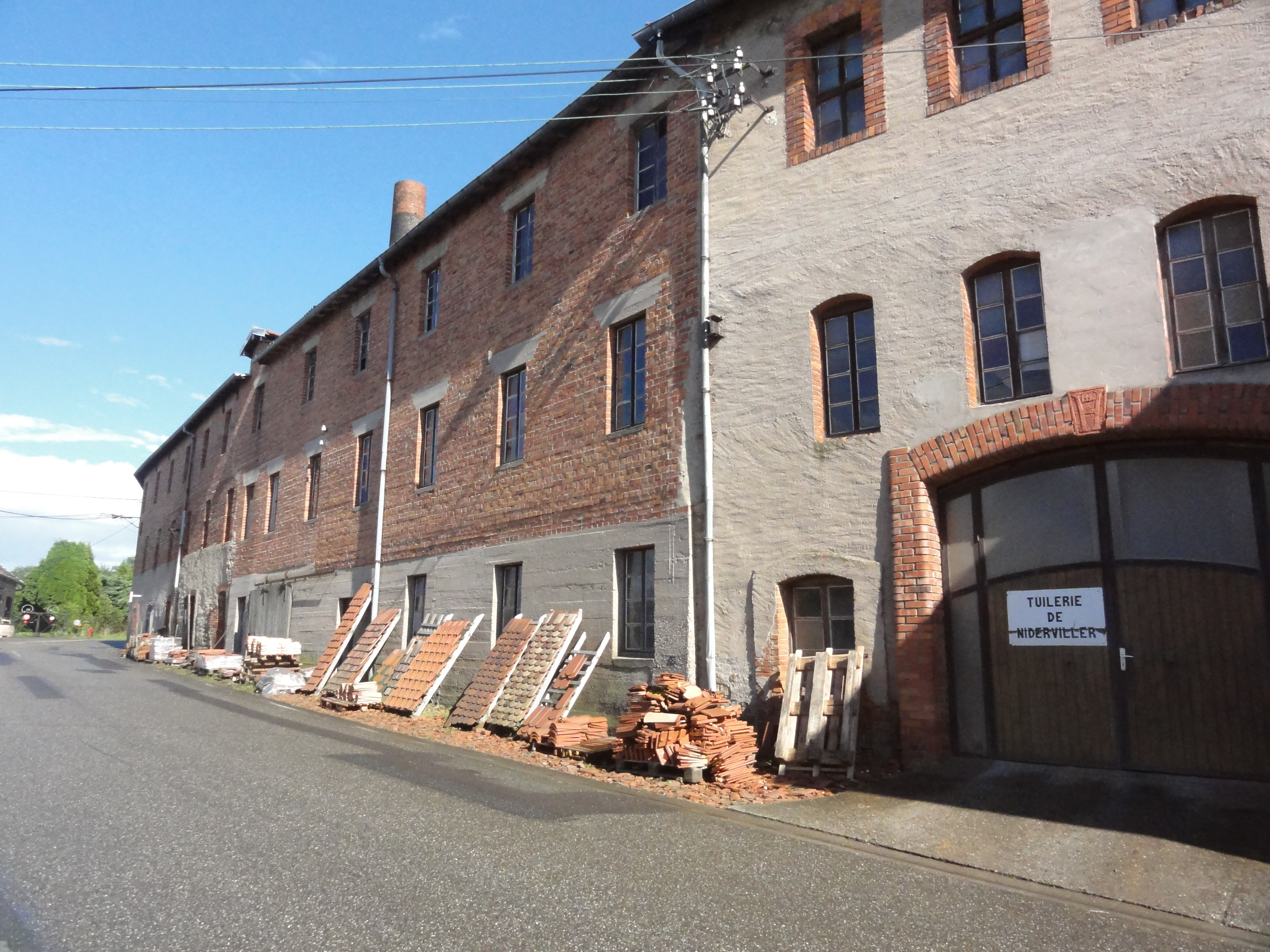
Tile factory

== Cultural events and festivities ==
La vallée de la Bièvre en fête is a fair that highlights the culture, the crafts and the gastronomy of the local territory.

== Notable people ==
- Astolphe de Custine: a French artistocrat and writer who was born in Niderviller

== See also ==
- Communes of the Moselle department
